= Kelly Shaefer =

Musical artist (born 1968)

- Born: September 13, 1968; Norwood, Ohio, U.S.
- Genres: Technical death metal, progressive metal, thrash metal
- Occupation: Musician
- Instruments: Vocals, guitar
- Years active: 1984–present
- Labels: Active Records, Music for Nations, Metal Blade Records, Relapse Records

Kelly Shaefer (born September 13, 1968), is an American singer, songwriter and guitarist. He is the founder and frontman of Atheist, Neurotica and Till the Dirt .

== Biography ==
Kelly was born in Norwood, Ohio to Sandra McGowan. His parents divorced when he was young and moved to Florida with his mother and sister. Kelly decided he wanted to become a musician after watching his sisters boyfriend play the guitar. Kelly learned how to write music after his mother bought him an electric guitar. Shaefer attended Sarasota High School and Booker High School in Sarasota, Florida. Kelly started performing in 1983, and by 1985 he was performing in a band called R.A.V.A.G.E. (now known as Atheist and previously called Oblivion). Kelly had his first experience touring with Candlemass. On the way home from this tour, Shaefer was involved in a tour van accident on a highway in Los Angeles that took the life of Atheist bassist Roger Patterson. Shaefer said it took years to recover mentally from the incident. Since 2023, Shaefer has been the only constant member in Atheist following the departure of drummer Steve Flynn.

== Personal life ==
Shaefer has one son and one daughter. Despite the name of his band, and stating that he does not believe in the God from the Bible, Shaefer has affirmed that he does in fact believe in God, describing God as "pure love."

== Discography ==
=== Albums ===
- Piece of Time (August 30, 1989, US) with Atheist
- Unquestionable Presence (August 30, 1991, US) with Atheist
- Elements (August 1993, US) with Atheist
- Seed (1998) with Neurotica
- Living in Dog Years (1999) with Neurotica
- Neurotica (2002) with Neurotica
- Unquestionable Presence: Live At Wacken (July 21, 2009, US) with Atheist
- Jupiter (November 8, 2010, US) with Atheist
- Outside The Spiral (2023) with Till The Dirt
