= Unquestionable Presence: Live at Wacken =

Unquestionable Presence: Live At Wacken

Live album by Atheist
- Released: July 21, 2009
- Recorded: 2006
- Genres: Technical death metal Jazz fusion
- Length: 1:23:51
- Label: Relapse Records
- Producer: Matt Washburn

Atheist chronology
Elements (1993)	Unquestionable Presence: Live At Wacken (2009)	Jupiter (2010)

Unquestionable Presence: Live At Wacken is a two disc album by the technical death metal band Atheist. Disc one features the band's reunion performance at Wacken Open Air in 2006 and disc two, titled Pieces of Time 1988-1993, features a compilation of Atheist tracks from previous albums, including Piece of Time, Unquestionable Presence and Elements.

== Critical reception ==
Professional ratings
Review scores
Source	Rating
Blabbermouth.net	7.5/10 stars

The first disc was described by Blabbermouth.net as a "dazzling eight-song set", while the second disc was criticized for not offering more variety, though on the whole, the two albums were described as "a cool little package."

== Track listings ==
Disc one

No.	Title	Length
1.	"Unquestionable Presence"	4:53
2.	"On They Slay"	4:01
3.	"Unholy War"	2:28
4.	"Your Life's Retribution"	3:17
5.	"An Incarnation's Dream"	3:54
6.	"Mother Man"	5:59
7.	"And The Psychic Saw"	5:29
8.	"Piece of Time"	5:58
Total length:		41:43

Disc two

No.	Title	Length
1.	"Piece Of Time"	4:33
2.	"I Deny"	4:00
3.	"Unholy War"	2:18
4.	"Room With A View"	4:05
5.	"Mother Man"	4:33
6.	"Unquestionable Presence"	4:07
7.	"And The Psychic Saw"	4:49
8.	"An Incarnation's Dream"	4:52
9.	"Mineral"	4:33
10.	"Water"	4:28
11.	"Air"	5:34
Total length:		47:53

== Personnel ==
=== Disc 1 ===
- Kelly Schaefer – vocals
- Sonny Carson – lead guitar
- Chris Baker – rhythm guitar
- Tony Choy – bass
- Steve Flynn – drums

=== Disc 2, Tracks 1–4 ===
- Kelly Shaefer – vocals, rhythm guitar
- Rand Burkey – lead guitar
- Roger Patterson – bass
- Steve Flynn – drums

=== Disc 2, Tracks 5–8 ===
- Kelly Shaefer – vocals, rhythm guitar
- Rand Burkey – lead guitar
- Tony Choy – bass
- Steve Flynn – drums

=== Disc 2, Tracks 9–11 ===
- Kelly Shaefer − lead vocals, rhythm guitar
- Rand Burkey − lead guitar
- Frank Emmi − lead guitar
- Tony Choy − bass
- Josh Greenbaum − drums

Production

- Matt Washburn – mixing
