= Kyle Sokol =

American bassist and skateboarder (born 1974)

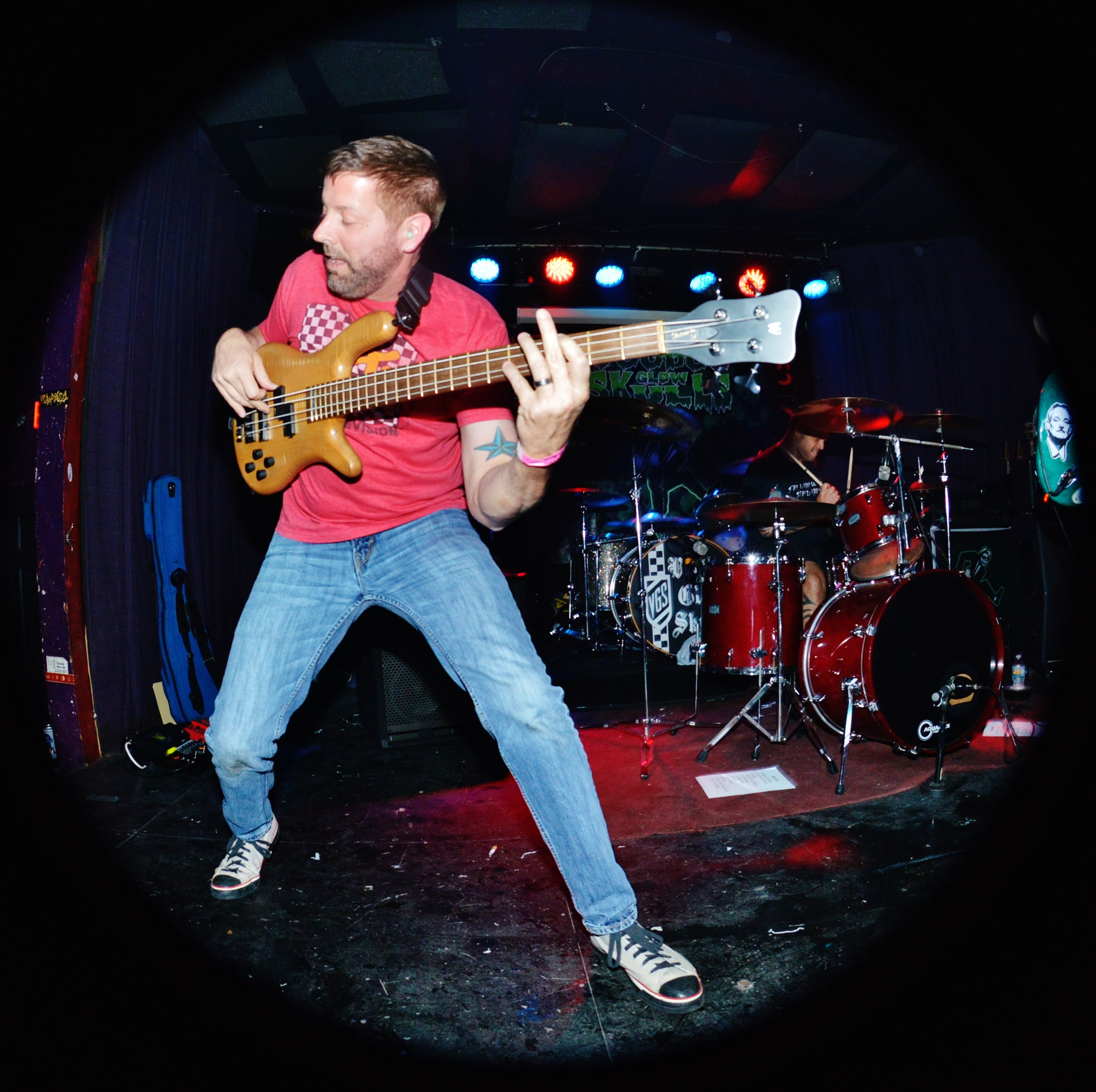
- Kyle Sokol at Local 662, St. Pete, FL 2017

Background information
- Born: October 31, 1974 (age 51); St. Petersburg, Florida, United States
- Genres: Death metal, progressive metal, Power Metal, ska punk, funk, heavy metal
- Occupation: Musician
- Instrument: Bass
- Labels: Profound Lore Records, FHM Records, ROAR Records, Nuclear Blast
- Website: www.kylesokol.com

Kyle Sokol (born October 31, 1974) is an American bassist and skateboarder. He is currently with Nasty Savage, Medieval Steel, Astronomica, Nocturnus A.D., Argus, and Rude Squad. Kyle has also played with Disareyen, Mercy McCoy, Trace of Day, Sectioned, King of Denmark, Noble Jones, and Hell on Earth.

He contributed to the long running Rivot Rag Tampa Bay metal music magazine/publication with a bass guitar column entitled "The Low End" for several years. He is one of the few bass players in metal that uses extensively the slap & pop playing technique, along with two-handed tapping. He was chosen by Kelly Shaefer of the Band Atheist to play while Kelly was in Neurotica and about to tour on Ozzfest. Kyle contributed to Kelly Shaefer's latest album "Outside the Spiral" from the band Till The Dirt on Nuclear Blast Records with a bass track for one of the songs alongside Steve Di Giorgio.

Current Bass Endorsements are: Dean Bass Guitars, Genzler mplification, EMG Pickups

The reunion of Atheist never came to fruition for a myriad of reasons at that time. Sokol currently tours internationally with Nasty Savage and Medieval Steel. He teaches lessons privately and works as a session player in the Tampa, Florida area. He has worked with, played with, and or recorded with artists such as Victor Wooten, Steve Bailey, Chuck Rainey, Peter Frampton, Edgar Meyer, Stu Hamm, Howard Levy, Joseph Wooten, Future Man, Richard Bona, JD Blair, Anthony Jackson, 311, Matisyahu, Rancid, Pietasters, Framing Hanley, Everclear, and 10 Years to name a few. He has served as a part-time staff member with Victor Wooten at his Wooten Bass/Nature Camp in Nashville, Tennessee.

Sokol is also known for his sponsored and professional skateboarding career. He started skating in about 1983, and grew up skating with such other local Florida pros as Rodney Mullen and Mike McGill. In 2001, he had an "oldschool style" pro model on Blitz Skateboards, which the company later changed the name to Subvert Skateboards due to legal issues with the prior name.

Currently, he skateboards for Webb Trucks. Sokol is commonly known as "Old School Kyle" or "OSK". He also developed and founded the Florida Skate Museum, which captures the history of Florida skateboarding and decks from Florida riders.

== Articles ==
- Creative Loafing: Rude Squad rock a full house with VooDoo Glow Skulls from
- Rude Squad at the Free for All from Tampa Bay Online
- Great Music You've Never Heard from The St. Pete Crew
- Floridian: In Your Own Backyard from The St. Pete Times
- Coping Block Issue 42: Florida Skate Museum interview from Coping Block
