= Jupiter (Atheist album) =

Studio album by Atheist
- Released: November 8, 2010
- Recorded: July–August 2010 at LedBelly studios, Atlanta, Georgia
- Genre: Technical death metal; progressive metal; jazz fusion
- Length: 32:47
- Label: Season of Mist

Atheist chronology
Elements (1993)	Jupiter (2010)

Jupiter is the fourth studio album by the Florida technical death metal band Atheist, released on November 8, 2010, through Season of Mist.

It is the band's first studio album in 17 years since the release of Elements in 1993.

== Background ==
After the release of Elements, Atheist disbanded in 1994. On October 5, 2005, Atheist vocalist Kelly Shaefer announced that the band would possibly reform to play live shows sometime in the following year. In January 2006 the band reformed with Shaefer on vocals, Rand Burkey on guitar, Tony Choy on bass, and Steve Flynn on drums and announced festival appearances.

On July 12, 2008, Shaefer announced that he and drummer Steve Flynn would be meeting up to write music together for the first time since Unquestionable Presence in 1991. On March 6, 2009, Atheist announced that they had signed with the Independent record label, Season of Mist and on July 5, 2010, they finally entered the studio to begin recording a new album.

On July 11, 2010, Atheist revealed that the new album will be named "Jupiter" and that it is scheduled for a November release. In August 2010, the band revealed the track listing for the album and announced that bassist Tony Choy parted ways with the band. A replacement bassist hasn't been brought in, as guitarist Jonathan Thompson also recorded the bass tracks for the new album.

== Reception ==
Professional ratings
Review scores
Source	Rating
AllMusic	3.5/5 stars
Metal Hammer	(5/7)
Sputnikmusic	4/5 stars

Jupiter has received generally favorable reviews. Skullsnbones.com states, "Does Jupiter live up to its predecessors? The short answer is sadly no." However, the review later states, "I want to make it very clear that this is not a bad album, just not what Atheist fans had been hoping for." Similarly, a review from allmusic.com states that "This album isn't a failure by any means, but it's not going to make old-school Atheist fans very happy, either." Tyler Munro of Sputnikmusic said that "In the end, Jupiter hits more marks than it misses, and no matter how you look at it, it's hard to argue with a new Atheist album. Especially one that sounds as natural as Jupiter."

== Track listing ==
No.	Title	Length
1.	"Second to Sun"	4:02
2.	"Fictitious Glide"	4:51
3.	"Fraudulent Cloth"	3:21
4.	"Live and Live Again"	3:37
5.	"Faux King Christ"	3:59
6.	"Tortoise the Titan"	3:37
7.	"When the Beast"	4:55
8.	"Third Person"	4:07
Total length:		32:29

== Personnel ==
Atheist

- Kelly Shaefer - vocals, rhythm guitar (track 5)
- Steve Flynn - drums
- Chris Baker - rhythm guitar
- Jonathan Thompson - lead guitar, bass

Production

- Matt Washburn - recording engineer
- Jason Suecof - mixing
- Eliran Kantor - artwork
