= Florida death metal =

Regional scene and subgenre of death metal from Florida

- Stylistic origins: Death metal, thrash metal
- Cultural origins: Mid-to-late 1980s
- Typical instruments: Guitar, bass, drums, vocals

Local scenes
- Tampa Bay area

Other topics
- List of Florida death metal bands

Florida death metal is a regional scene and stylistic subdivision of death metal. Some of the most significantly pioneering and best-selling death metal acts emerged in Florida, especially in the Tampa Bay area. As a result, Tampa is unofficially known by many death metal fans as the "capital of death metal." The scene coalesced in the mid-1980s through early 1990s around the output of bands such as Death, Morbid Angel, Deicide, Obituary, Six Feet Under, Monstrosity, Atheist, Solstice, Nocturnus and Massacre. The producer Scott Burns and the studio Morrisound Recording were also instrumental in developing and popularizing the Florida scene. Some bands which originated outside of Florida, such as Cannibal Corpse and Malevolent Creation from New York, relocated to the state in order to participate in this burgeoning scene. The Florida bands featured a more technical approach to the evolving death metal sound, a style which spread beyond the confines of the state, and some were instrumental in creating the progressive death metal subgenre. The death metal genre as a whole, including the Florida scene, declined in popularity in the second half of the 1990s, but many bands within the Florida scene persisted and the scene resurged in popularity in subsequent decades. Although the scene attracted more media attention, it continued to be underground due to its extreme nature.

== Characteristics ==
=== Features of death metal ===
Death metal is an extreme sub-genre of heavy metal music that features fast, distorted, down-tuned, and sometimes palm-muted guitar instrumentation, growled and screamed vocals, and hyper-fast, blast beat drumming. Death metal lyrics typically feature graphic, sometimes pornographic and misogynistic, themes of violence, gore, disease, and death; Satanic, blasphemous, and anti-Christian content; or, to a lesser extent, war, apocalypse, social and philosophical concerns, and esotericism and spiritualism.

The Florida scene was key in the genre's development, with the extremely fast, machine gun-like blast-beats and low, nearly unintelligible vocals of Florida bands helping distinguish death metal from its roots in thrash metal. Through the work of producers such as Scott Burns, the raw, primitive sound of early bands transformed into a thicker, more brutal sound. Obituary and Malevolent Creation introduced groove to the genre, while the song "Imperial Doom" by Monstrosity inspired the more complex technical direction the scene would take. Chris Barnes of Cannibal Corpse, which re-located from Buffalo, New York to Tampa in 1990, and Glen Benton of Deicide also influenced the development of the death growl. The production values from Burns often focused on instrumentals rather than the voice, so the vocalists would chiefly use their voice for percussive and instrumental effect. For instance, Obituary's vocalist John Tardy said that "if I couldn't come up with the words to go along with the song, I'd just kinda make something up and just fill in something that wasn't maybe a word, but it sounded good and fit in the song."

=== Particular traits of the Florida scene ===
In addition to its contributions to core death metal traits, the Florida style includes additional unique aspects. Generally, guitar tunings are not dropped as low as in other death metal styles, and the playing is considered by many to be tighter, clearer, and more precise. The guitar playing is often more technical than that of other death metal variants. Professor Michelle Phillipov explains that death metal songs usually are constructed as a series of riffs, with each riff section added onto the next. The Florida style takes this further, and juxtaposes different riffs in jarring succession. For instance, the Obituary song "Deadly Intentions" (1989) switches between six different riffs, played variously at normal time, half-time, and double-time. The song lacks a verse-chorus structure, and before any riff section is repeated, the five others are played, and the tempo accelerated or decelerated throughout. Similar is Morbid Angel's "Maze of Torment" (1989), which alternates between "muscular, 'headbanging' riffs" and extended blast beats, off-balancing the rhythm's center. The intensity of the riffing often results in the vocals and instruments mixing into a singular blocks of sound, making it difficult for listeners to anticipate sectional transitions.

Obituary frequently plays moving power chords in tritones using inversions. These riffs are often based on E Phrygian, except the 3 and a ♭5 are added before the riff repeats. A syncopated rhythm with chord changes consisting of two punctuated quarter-notes and one regular quarter-note is typical of many Obituary songs. Sometimes the riff is played with open chords, sometimes combined with tremolo picking "where the notes change on the 'and' of beat 2 and beat 4." On slower songs, the E Phrygian is played except with a natural 2 in the last measure. The power chords are inverted to allow the chord to be played on the fifth string and retain a thick sound on the sixth. Use of a fourth interval instead of a fifth adds a level of dissonance. A simple rhythm that alternates between sixteenth-notes and eighth-notes is also common for the band.

One of the frequently applied techniques of Morbid Angel is using only a few power chords and octave dyads for rhythmic accents. A typical riff for the band is palm-muted tremolo-picked sixteenth-notes at high speed (for example, 210 beats per minute). The riff stays on each tremolo-picked section for a couple beats, creating a rather static feeling, particularly so when combined with fast double-bass drum and snare that accents the power chords and dyads. Slower examples of signature Morbid Angel riffs comprise octaves, power chords, and palm-muted single-notes. The harmonic scale is E minor with some additional chromatic notes. Typically the 3 is generally minor and the ♭2 at the end of the last measure adds a Phrygian component to the sound. The phrasing is key to these riffs – the dyads are drawn out longer and the first dyad is slid into from a half-step below. Morbid Angel was among the first extreme metal bands to play these octaves in slow riffs and thus add an eerie quality to the music. Another trademark feature of Trey Azagthoth's playing style is using slides on the chromatic power chords to create a slurry effect.

Early albums by Death commonly featured rhythmic accents, held quarter-note power chords, and tremolo picking. Faster riffs on earlier recordings typically played two major thirds a half-step apart. Very typical riffs from that era are melodic major thirds based on A–C♯ and G♯–B♯ intervals which are split by a short sixteenth-note burst on the sixth string. Moving toward an F♯5, the figure begins the major third movement on the 5 of the power chord and then goes a half-step down as it is played against an insistent recurring F♯. Another signature pattern is a tremolo with rhythmic eighth-note accents on the 5 of the power chord of the moment: F♯ accents B5, A accents D5, G♯ accents C♯5, and E♯ accents A♯5.

Early output by Deicide frequently utilized riffs with a figure that was always "a descending minor second followed by a descending major third." The guitar duo in the band at the time, Eric and Brian Hoffman, would move different chromatic patterns to different string sets using the same frets. They favored rhythmic displacement, especially in tremolo picked riffs.

As the Florida scene advanced into the 1990s, many bands displayed increasing technical progression in their music. For instance, on the albums Spiritual Healing (1990) and Human (1991), Death, under the direction of its sole consistent member, Chuck Schuldiner, began playing more melodic guitar lines and increasingly complex tempo changes as well as more refined songwriting and lyrics. Human, in particular, showcased jazz-influenced guitar work and polyrhythmic drumming, courtesy of respective Cynic members Paul Masvidal and Sean Reinart. In 1990, the band Nocturnus released The Key, which featured science fiction lyrics and the use of keyboard. Other Florida bands adopted even more technical and progressive approaches to death metal. For example, Atheist, formed in 1984 in Sarasota, and Cynic, formed in 1987 in Miami, both matured from their thrash and death metal roots into highly technical, jazz-style progressive death metal artists, with Cynic's work occasionally even bordering on jazz fusion.

=== Violence at early concerts ===
Early concerts often featured gore and violence both from musicians and among audiences. The frontman of Nasty Savage, "Nasty" Ronnie Galletti, engaged in various antics such as smashing televisions on-stage, an activity that would leave him covered in blood. Morbid Angel likewise utilized gruesome stage performances such as cutting themselves. This behavior extended beyond concerts. Kelly Shaefer of Atheist recalls when he once encountered the members of Morbid Angel backstage "sitting around a chalice, cutting themselves and bleeding into the cup. I thought, That's fuckin' nuts. We played crazy music, but we didn't roll like that." Shaefer also recalls violent incidents from mosh pits: "I saw someone get their eye poked out of the socket. The eyeball wasn't hanging out, it was pushed out to the side and the guy stayed in the pit with that fucked-up eye. I saw another guy get his ear half ripped off from the top. The whole top of it was flopping down from his head." The band Deicide, formed under the name Amon in 1987, would fill mannequins and buckets with rotten organs acquired from local butchers and then spill the contents into the audience. Vocalist Glen Benton burnt an inverted cross into his forehead to advertise the vehemently anti-Christian stance of the band. Benton would also join in the violence in the audience. For instance, at one concert he "made this armband with .308 Spitzer head [bullets] on it, and went through the crowd sticking that thing into people's backs. At the end of the night there were just a bunch of screws sticking out of the thing where all the bullet heads fell off the armbands. And there were all these people walking around with big blood spike marks on their backs."

== History ==
=== Beginnings (1982–1988) ===
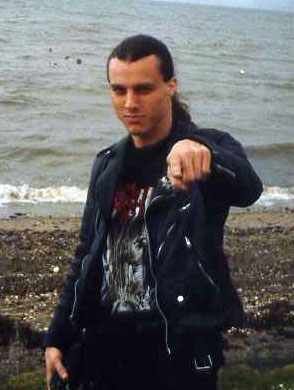
Chuck Schuldiner of the band Death, depicted here on tour in Scotland in 1992

Death metal emerged as a genre during the mid-1980s, primarily out of thrash metal. In the early- to mid-1980s, the European bands Venom, Bathory, Celtic Frost (and its predecessor Hellhammer), Sodom, Destruction, and Kreator performed a more extreme style of heavy metal music that set sonic and lyrical templates for the thrash, black, and death metal genres. The American band Slayer also influenced what would become death metal, featuring graphic lyrics dealing with death, dismemberment, war, and the horrors of hell. However, the California band Possessed, which formed in 1983, is generally considered to have released first true death metal recording, Seven Churches, in 1985. Within the state of Florida, the band Savatage, formed in 1978 in Tarpon Springs as Avatar, was highly influential on local aspiring musicians. Morrisound Recording, founded in 1981 in Tampa, picked up Avatar and released the band's debut album, City Beneath the Surface, in 1982. Tom Morris, co-owner of Morrisound, states that his studio attempted to emulate the production values of fellow Metal Blade bands Metallica and Slayer. "Those albums had heavy production, and we were like, 'We should try that'".

Nasty Savage formed in 1982 in Brandon, Florida, a town in the Tampa Bay Area, and quickly attracted attention for its gruesome shock rock. The band soon added a second guitarist, and began playing more intricate and unusual time signatures, signature riffs, and diminished scales. Nasty Savage released a demo recording in 1983, and quickly garnered attention from magazines and record labels. It signed a deal with Metal Blade Records and released its self-titled debut album in 1985. The album was recorded at Morrisound Recording, which would also record the band's next two albums.

Among the fans and frequent concert attendees of Nasty Savage were Chuck Schuldiner, Rick Rozz, and Kam Lee, who, in 1983 in Altamonte Springs in Greater Orlando, founded a band called the Mantas. Inspired by Nasty Savage, the Mantas took that band's sound and turned it deeper and more sinister. After the Mantas released a demo recording, Death by Metal, they disbanded. However, the group was quickly reformed under a new name, Death, and released several more demos, Reign of Terror (1984), Infernal Death (1985), and Mutilation (1986). Starting in 1985, Death performed along with Nasty Savage at Ruby's and then later at Sunset Club. Following Mutilation, Death signed to Combat Records. When Rick Rozz and Kam Lee refused to relocate to California to record an album, Schuldiner left without them and formed a new lineup in California. This new version of Death released the band's debut album, Scream Bloody Gore, in 1987. Rozz and Lee helped form the band Massacre, only to rejoin Death when Schuldiner moved back to Florida in time to record Leprosy, which was released in 1988.

Another Tampa-based, Morbid Angel, formed in 1983 and, like Nasty Savage, garnered attention for its gruesome stage antics. Morbid Angel recorded a full-length album, Abominations of Desolation, in 1986, but did not release it as the group was dissatisfied with the results. After Pete Sandoval from the California grindcore band Terrorizer joined Morbid Angel, the band finally released its debut album, Altars of Madness, in 1989.

Inspired by Nasty Savage, Death, Morbid Angel, and Savatage, in 1984 the band Obituary, then known as Xecutioner, formed. Vocalist John Tardy later explained that the aforementioned artists "really got me into it, got our band started. They made us want to be as heavy as we possibly could." According to Tardy, "we moved from Miami to Tampa when we were young, and the first people we came in contact with in our neighborhood were the guys in Nasty Savage and Savatage. Those were the two bands that even got us interested in playing music." Xecutioner was the first band picked up by Morrisound. Explains Tom Morris: "They cut a demo in a little 8-track studio we have and that's what got them signed. But when John and Donald [Tardy] first came in, I almost told them just to go home. I had never heard death-metal prior to that and I thought they were just wasting their time and money. But they were pretty insistent and went ahead and finished it and, obviously, they proved me wrong." Borivoj Krgin, who later would found Blabbermouth.net, co-owned an independent record label Godly Records which was producing a compilation, Raging Death, to promote underground bands. Two Xecutioner songs, "Find the Arise" and "Like the Dead", were included on the 1987 compilation, which caught the attention of mainstream labels. The band signed to Roadrunner Records and changed its name to Obituary in order to avoid confusion with other bands with the name "Executioner".

As the Florida scene burgeoned, fans of Death, Morbid Angel, and Deicide would trade hand-drawn artwork and home-recorded demo tapes, and exchanged demos with overseas fans. By the late 1980s, the Sunset Club was selling out at its maximum capacity of 200 people. Attracted by these successes, the Buffalo, New York band Malevolent Creation re-located to Florida in 1988, where it soon was signed to Roadrunner Records.

=== Peak period (1989–1994) ===
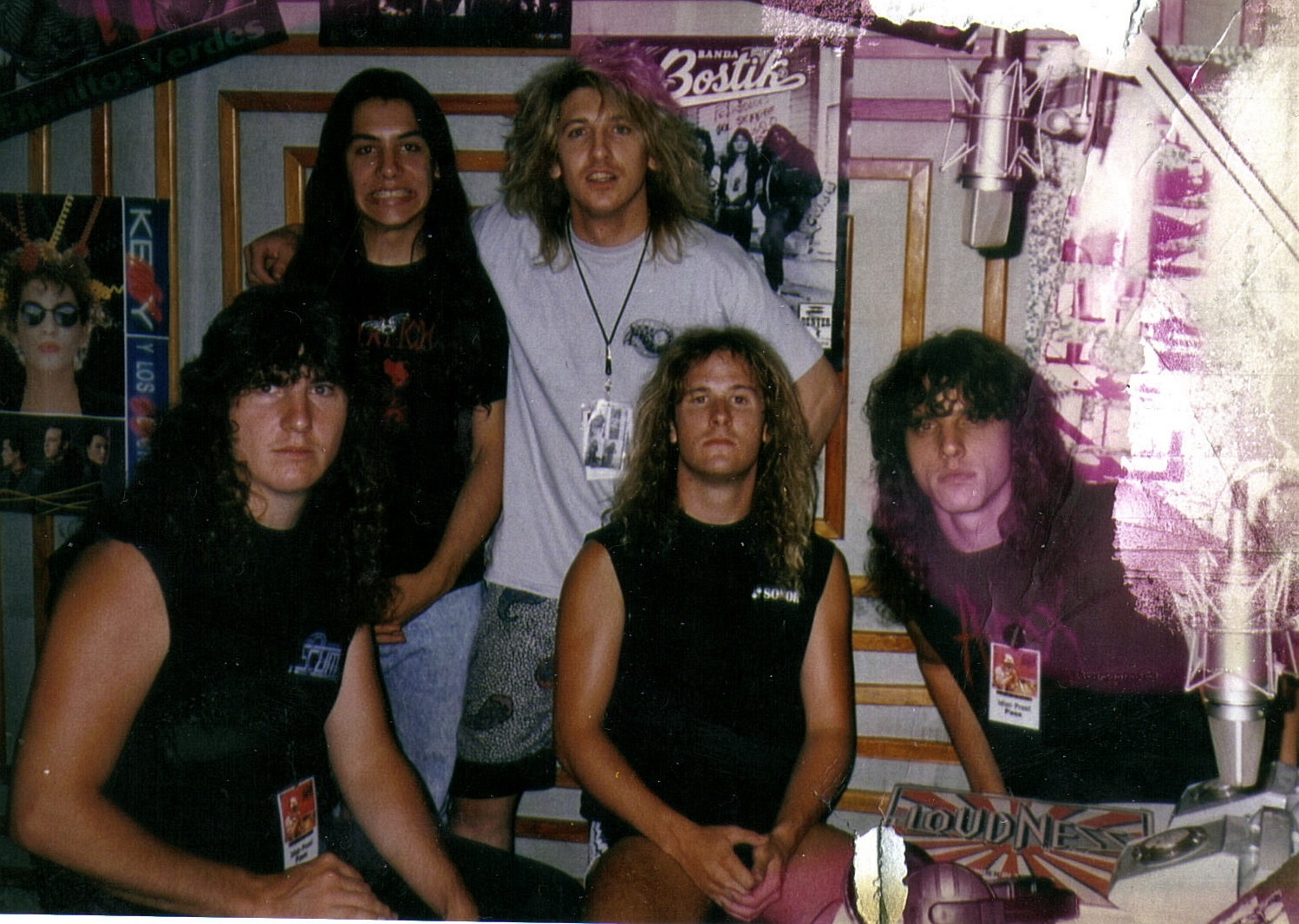
The band Death in Mexico City, 1989. Left to right: Paul Masvidal, Terry Butler, manager Eric Greif, Bill Andrews, and Chuck Schuldiner

The Morbid Angel release Altars of Madness set a new precedent for heavy metal bands. AllMusic writer Jason Birchmeier states that "With the arguable exception of Chuck Schuldiner's Death, never before had a heavy metal band carried their lightning-fast guitar riffs and equally spellbinding guitar solos into such horrific territory." Vocalist David Vincent took influence from Schuldiner and the emerging English grindcore scene for his snarled vocal delivery, and lyrically Morbid Angel took the Satanic themes of previous groups such as Slayer and Venom to new, greater extremes. During the recording sessions at Morrisound for the album, the British record label Earache Records contacted Sandoval, expressing interest in releasing a recording for his now-defunct band Terrorizer. The two other former members agreed to re-locate from California to Florida, and Terrorizer re-formed to record World Downfall, with Morbid Angel's David Vincent filling in as a bass guitarist. The album, produced by Scott Burns, took two days to record. Obituary also debuted their first album, Slowly We Rot. The relative success of the album contributed to musicians flocking to record at Morrisound. The band Atheist, which formed in 1984, released their debut album, Piece of Time, in 1989 in Europe, but it took another year before the album would be released in the United States. Featuring "death-jazz", a mixture of death metal with jazz-rock, the dense, highly technical album, with shifting tempos, non-linear and dissonant riffs, proved challenging even for a death metal audience.

Seeking better production quality and the thriving local scene, Cannibal Corpse of Buffalo, New York, in 1990 relocated to Florida, like their Buffalo compatriots Malevolent Creation had done a few years prior. The bassist Alex Webster states that "Morrisound was the first studio in the United States — well, the world, really — that had a handle on what to do." The band released its debut, Eaten Back to Life, which featured "remarkably low and unintelligible" vocals from Chris Barnes. In the same year, Deicide released their debut album, which featured riffs and solos in the style of Slayer and multi-layered vocals, and Death released Spiritual Healing, a record which demonstrated a shift by the band into a cleaner production approach and slower, more technical instrumentation and more refined songwriting. Nocturnus also released their debut album, The Key, which with its science fiction themes and use of keyboards was very atypical and pioneering for the genre.

Eduardo Rivadavia of AllMusic describes 1991 as "year one of death metal's world saturation." In that year, Morbid Angel released Blessed Are the Sick and Death released Human. Human saw Death continue its development of a technical and progressive style, abandoned the previous themes of zombies and gore in favor of more philosophical and political lyrics, and featured the talents of Paul Masvidal and Sean Reinart of the then-unsigned Cynic. Though Morbid Angel and Death fared well, tragedy struck the band Atheist, which, while on tour with Candlemass in February 1991, suffered a tour bus crash which claimed the life of bassist Roger Patterson. The band decide to continue with the recording for their next album and dedicate it to their lost band-mate, for whom Tony Choy filled in to complete the needed bass work. The final product, Unquestionable Presence, was released in October of that year. Both more intricate and accessible than the band's previous record, with complicated time signatures, slap bass, dissonant and speedy riffs, and enigmatic lyrics, the recording is considered one of the scene's ultimate progressive metal outputs. James Hinchcliffe, in a retrospective in Terrorizer, described Unquestionable Presence as "the very pinnacle of scorching yet brain-twisting technical metal." In 1992, Monstrosity debuted with Imperial Doom, but then after some touring saw its original band lineup fall apart. Nocturnus, shortly after its third, self-titled 1993 release, disbanded. Death continued to further develop their progressive sound, releasing Individual Thought Patterns in 1993. Taking the technicality seen previously on Human to an even greater level, Individual Thought Patterns cemented Death's reputation as not only one of death metal's founders, but as "one of its most creative, musically proficient, and listenable bands." Morbid Angel released Covenant in 1993. The latter marked the high point for death metal not only in Florida but in the genre as a whole. It was lauded by audiences and critics, and experienced, for the genre, immense commercial success, selling over 127,000 copies. Michael Nelson of Stereogum retroactively summarized it as "not just the best death metal album ever, but the best-selling death metal album, too." Cynic, after a planned tour in Europe with the Dutch band Pestilence fell through when Pestilence disbanded, decided to disband as well.

=== Decline (1994–2001) ===
Encouraged by the financial success of Covenant, other major labels such as Columbia Records picked up numerous death metal bands. However, subsequent death metal releases did not sell nearly as well as Covenant, and these bands were dropped from their major labels over the next few years. Much of death metal's audience turned their attention to grunge and the early Norwegian black metal scene. Concurrent with this, the scene began fracturing into sub-genres, and many bands lost their creative and artistic impetus. Some bands, such as Morbid Angel, Deicide, Monstrosity, Malevolent Creation, and Cannibal Corpse, persisted through the decline. Cannibal Corpse released The Bleeding in 1994, which while slower and catchier than previous releases was still as successful. The follow-up, Vile, released in 1996, brought more notoriety and popularity to the band after Senator Bob Dole criticized the band for its vulgarity. During the recording of Vile, the band's original vocalist, Chris Barnes, left to form a side project, Six Feet Under, which produced a groovier and catchier style deemed less extreme than his previous death metal work. In place of Barnes, Cannibal Corpse recruited George "Corpsegrinder" Fisher from Monstrosity, after that band completed the recordings for 1996's Millennium. In 1995, Hibernus Mortis formed in Miami and for years was the only death metal band representing South Florida (Cynic having already disbanded). Morbid Angel grew increasingly popular with the release of Domination in 1995 and the more aggressive and complex Formulas Fatal to the Flesh in 1998. Deicide released Once Upon the Cross in 1995 and Serpents of the Light in 1997, but then encountered trouble with Roadrunner Records as the label had become apathetic to the death metal genre. Eric Rutan from Morbid Angel left that band and formed Hate Eternal in 1997. He also founded the recording studio Mana. Death released Symbolic in 1995 and then disbanded so that Schuldiner could concentrate on a new project, Control Denied. Launching this project took longer than anticipated, so Schuldiner reformed Death to release a final album, The Sound of Perseverance, released in 1998. Retroactively labeled the finest release from the band and among the top metal albums of all time, the release continued the progressive direction of Death, drawing influences from Atheist, Cynic, and Dream Theater. Schuldiner then concentrated on recording with Control Denied, which released its first album in 1999. In 2000, Schuldiner was diagnosed with a malignant brain tumor. Despite fundraising and support efforts from the metal scene, Schuldiner died from the disease in December 2001. Nocturnus reformed in 1999 and released a third studio album, Ethereal Tomb, only to disband once again in 2002.

=== Subsequent developments (2001–present) ===
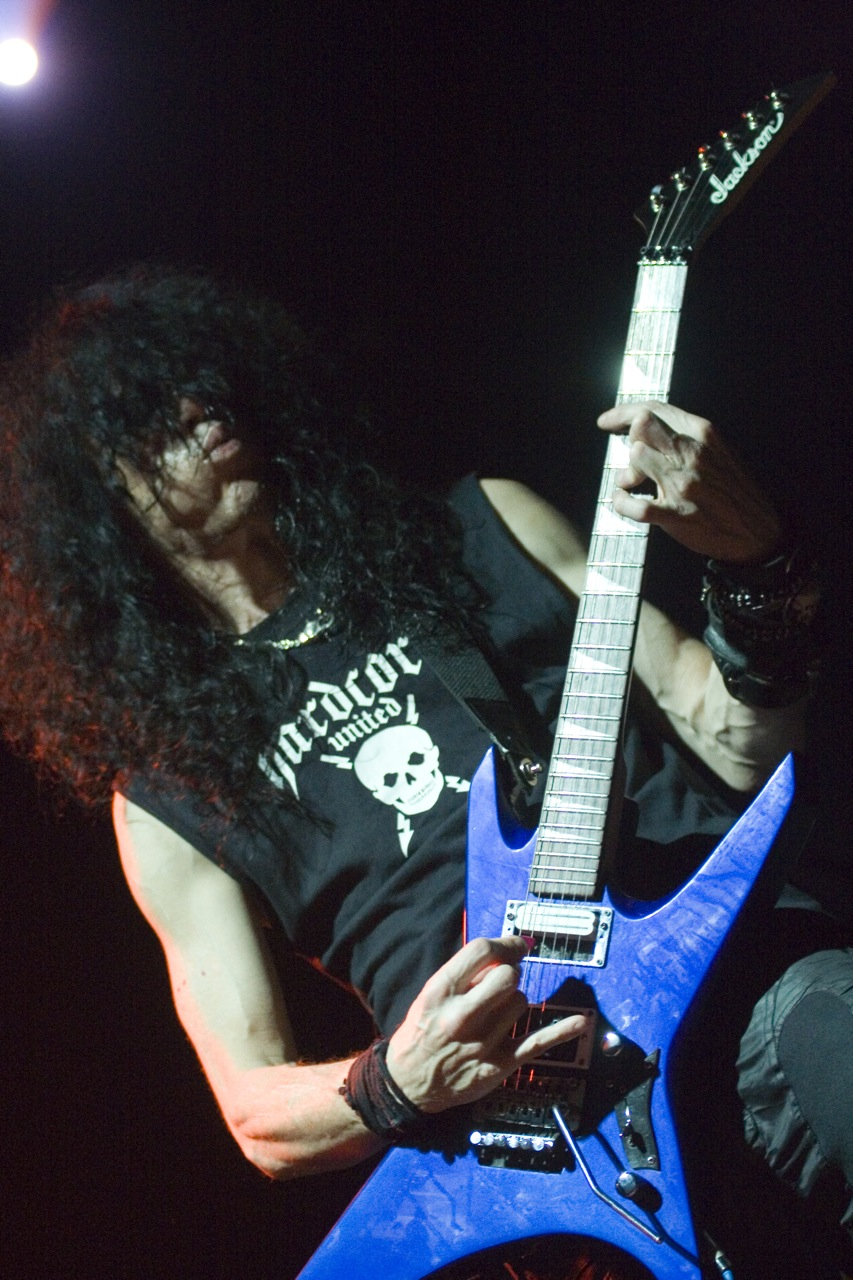
Trey Azagthoth of Morbid Angel in São Paulo, Brazil, 2009

Enduring the decline of death metal in the mid- and late-1990s and the dissolution of many bands, Morbid Angel, Cannibal Corpse, Deicide, and Obituary have remained central to the scene, and Monstrosity and Malevolent Creation have released powerful albums. Hibernus Mortis disbanded in 2006 then reformed six years later. The Absence formed in 2002, had its demos mastered at Morrisound, and in 2005, signed to Metal Blade Records. Cynic and Atheist, after over a decade of disbandment, each reformed in 2006. In 2009, the album Torture by Cannibal Corpse reached No. 38 on the Billboard 200. That same year, Nielsen Soundscan reported that Cannibal Corpse, Deicide, Morbid Angel, Six Feet Under, Obituary, and Death collectively had sold over five-million albums. Former members of Death in 2012 formed a tribute band, "Death to All", in honor of the late Chuck Schuldiner and subsequently have gone on several charity tours. Also in 2012, the Reuters reporter Andy Sullivan wrote about how the decision by the Republican Party to hold its 2012 convention in Tampa was considered ironic by some, such as AllMusic's Steve Huey, because of the seeming contrast between the lyrics and thematic imagery of the city's death metal bands and the espoused values of the Republican Party. The musicians themselves expressed ambivalence to the decision. The story in Reuters prompted Rachel Maddow to document the Tampa scene on the "Debunktion Junction" portion of her show on MSNBC. In 2015, Nocturnus reformed under the moniker Nocturnus AD, and released a fourth album in 2019. In 2015, Jim and Tom Morris decided to sell their Morrisound studio location to Trans-Siberian Orchestra (a spin-off of Savatage) and relocate. Tom explained that "We designed our facility on 56th Street to be a world class studio for the 1980s and '90s. The entire recording paradigm had a major shift that started in the late '90s and moved drastically after 2001." Obituary in the 2010s worked to reinvigorate the local Tampa scene. In 2016, vocalist John Tardy launched the Florida Metal Fest, with a debut lineup including Obituary, Corrosion of Conformity, Deicide, Malevolent Creation, and seven other bands. Tardy believes that recently, death metal has seen a resurgence. Several local Tampa venues continue to host metal bands, including death metal, such as the Orpheum, Crow bar, and The Ritz. "It feels like it's back where metal is being paid attention to and being respected in America like it was 25 years ago", says Tardy. The newer projects Grave Ascension and Vacuous Depths have been noted, respectively, by the media outlets WUSF and Creative Loafing (Tampa).

== Impact and legacy ==
Florida, specifically Tampa, would become known as the colloquial world capital of death metal. The Tampa Bay Times retrospectively noted that "Tampa became to death metal what Nashville is to country music and New Orleans is to jazz." Death's Chuck Schuldiner is considered the "father of death metal" and his band both spearheaded the first generation of death metal bands and influenced the rise of the genre's progressive explorations. As mentioned above, the Buffalo, New York bands Cannibal Corpse and Malevolent Creation relocated to Tampa because of the better recording and commercial opportunities there. Angelcorpse, from Kansas City, Missouri, likewise relocated to Florida in the beginning of their career. Also as mentioned above, the grindcore band Terrorizer, originally from Los Angeles, re-formed in Tampa to record World Downfall. Morbid Angel and Cannibal Corpse are possibly the most emulated bands in the scene and are major influences on Deeds of Flesh, Deranged, and Severe Torture, as well as many others. Nile, from South Carolina, features a mythological focus and musical style similar to Morbid Angel. Angelcorpse utilizes a style very similar to early Morbid Angel. Bands outside the United States influenced by Morbid Angel include the Brazilian projects Abhorrence, Nephasth, Rebaelliun, and Mental Horror, and European black metal bands such as Emperor, Zyklon, and Dimmu Borgir. Cannibal Corpse was particularly influential in pushing the extremity of lyrical subject matter. In the early years of the scene, the group was considered one of the most shocking for its transgression of propriety and taste in its depiction of torture, murder, and mutilation, often in highly sexual and misogynistic terms. Its extremity influenced the emergence of the even more extreme subgenre of goregrind. The importance of Morrisound Recording to the creating and popularizing the scene led other death metal bands from outside Florida to record at the studio, including Sepultura from Brazil and Napalm Death from Britain. Most later and contemporary extreme metal styles, including black metal, metalcore, djent, grindcore, deathcore, and Swedish death metal, trace their origins back to the Florida scene.

== See also ==
- List of Florida death metal bands
- Heavy metal subculture
- Swedish death metal

== Works cited ==
- "Atheist Regroup, Announce Exclusive Festival Appearances". Blabbermouth.net. January 13, 2006. Archived from the original on March 28, 2006.
- "Atheist Members Collaborating On First New Material Since 1991". Blabbermouth.net. July 12, 2008. Archived from the original on August 3, 2008.
- "Death metal music brings Orpheum owner to life". Tampa Bay Times. August 6, 2014.
- "Malevolent Creation Archives". Screamer Magazine.
- Ankeny, Jason. "Monstrosity - Biography". AllMusic.
- Bellino, Vince (March 21, 2019). "Nocturnus AD Announce New Album 'Paradox' and Share First Single". Decibel.
- Birchmeier, Jason. "Altars of Madness". AllMusic.
- Birchmeier, Jason. "World Downfall". AllMusic.
- Blum, Sam (March 21, 2013). "Death metal in Tampa: dark music celebrates a Sunshine State milestone". The Guardian.
- Bowar, Chad (March 17, 2017). "What Is Death Metal? A history and profile of the death metal genre". About.com. Archived from the original on July 1, 2019.
- Cridlin, Jay (September 10, 2018). "Deicide's Glen Benton talks biking in Tampa, writing about Satan, aging in death metal and more". Tampa Bay Times.
- DaRonco, Mike. "Atheist - Biography". AllMusic.
- Guzzo, Paul (December 11, 2018). "Death metal pioneers seek site to replace Temple Terrace studio". Tampa Bay Times.
- Guzzo, Paul (December 11, 2018). "Tampa band's lead singer: Death metal can rise again". Tampa Bay Times.
- Hartmann, Graham (August 30, 2012). "'Rachel Maddow Show' Declares Tampa, Florida as 'America's Death Metal Mecca'". Loudwire.
- Hartmann, Graham (February 27, 2013). "Former Death Members Unite for 'Death to All' 2013 Charity Tour". Loudwire.
- Hartmann, Graham (August 5, 2014). "'Death to All' Announce North American Tour With Obituary, Massacre + Rivers of Nihil". Loudwire.
- Henderson, Alex. "The Key". AllMusic.
- Henderson, Alex. "Hate Eternal". AllMusic.
- Hinchcliffe, James (November 2005). "Atheist: Piece of Time/Unquestionable Presence/Elements". Terrorizer (137): 72.
- Hitt, Tarpley (December 22, 2018). "Why Christmas Can't Quit Trans-Siberian Orchestra, 20 Years Later". The Daily Beast.
- Huey, Steve. "Abominations of Desolation". AllMusic.
- Huey, Steve. "Malevolent Creation - Biography". AllMusic.
- Huey, Steve. "Reign in Blood". AllMusic.
- Huey, Steve. "Slayer - Biography". AllMusic.
- Hundey, Jason. "The Sound of Perseverance". AllMusic.
- Marshall, Clay (November 28, 2018). "Still the orchestra plays: remembering Savatage's Criss Oliva". MusicRadar.
- McIver, Joel (2010). Extreme Metal II. London: Omnibus Press. ISBN 9780857122247.
- Miller, Daylina (November 28, 2017). "Born In Tampa, Death Metal Making A Comeback". WUSF.
- Monger, James Christopher. "Nocturnus". AllMusic.
- Nelson, Michael (June 20, 2013). "Covenant Turns 20". Stereogum.
- O'Connor, Andy (May 28, 2019). "Nocturnus AD: Paradox". Pitchfork.
- Orens, Geoff. "Sirens". AllMusic.
- de Paola, Enrico (March 2000). "Nei polmoni di inferno" [Into the Lungs of Hell]. Metal Hammer Italy (in Italian). Millennium Special (2). Translated by Chioccarelli, Vincenzo.
- Phillipov, Michelle (2012). Death Metal and Music Criticism: Analysis at the Limits. Lanham: Lexington Books. ISBN 9780739164617.
- Prato, Greg. "Morbid Angel - Biography". AllMusic.
- Pratt, Greg (June 20, 2011). "Death Human". Exclaim!.
- Preira, Matt (November 5, 2012). "Hibernus Mortis's Ralf Varela Talks Florida Death Metal and His Band's Legacy of Brutality". Miami New Times.
- Purcell, Natalie J. (2015). Death Metal Music: The Passion and Politics of a Subculture. Jefferson, North Carolina: McFarland & Company. ISBN 9780786484065.
- Rivadavia, Eduardo (November 1, 2018). "11 Florida Death Metal Albums You Need". Loudwire.
- Rivadavia, Eduardo. "Cynic - Biography". AllMusic.
- Rivadavia, Eduardo. "Death - Biography". AllMusic.
- Rivadavia, Eduardo. "Focus". AllMusic.
- Rivadavia, Eduardo. "Piece of Time". AllMusic.
- Rivadavia, Eduardo. "Seven Churches". AllMusic.
- Rivadavia, Eduardo. "Spiritual Healing". AllMusic.
- Rivadavia, Eduardo. "Unquestionable Presence". AllMusic.
- Rivadavia, Eduardo. "Welcome to Hell". AllMusic.
- Roa, Ray (July 16, 2015). "Music Issue 2015: Will there be more Morrisound?". Creative Loafing (Tampa).
- Roa, Ray (September 11, 2019). "Tampa death metal band releases 2017 demos on cassette this Saturday". Creative Loafing (Tampa).
- Schneider, David (April 6, 2019). "Mort, Death's Apprentice: The Florida Metal Scene". Premier Guitar.
- Sharpe-Young, Garry (2007). Metal: The Definitive Guide. London: Jawbone Press. ISBN 9781906002015.
- Shaw, Zach (August 31, 2012). "MSNBC's Rachel Maddow Declares Tampa, FL The Capital Of Death Metal". Metal Insider.
- Shteamer, Hank (June 21, 2017). "The 100 Greatest Metal Albums of All Time: Death, 'Human' (1991)". Rolling Stone.
- Stevenson, Arielle (October 22, 2009). "The way the music died: The earliest days of Tampa Death Metal". Tampa Bay Times. Times Publishing Company. Archived from the original on October 27, 2009.
- Sullivan, Andy (August 25, 2012). "Death metal, the sound of Tampa, won't be heard at Republican convention". Reuters. Archived from the original on August 25, 2012.
- Torreano, Bradley. "Chuck Schuldiner - Biography". AllMusic.
- Wagner, Jeff (2010). Mean Deviation: Four Decades of Progressive Heavy Metal. Brooklyn: Bazillion Points. ISBN 9780979616334.
- Wiederhorn, Jon (August 31, 2017). "Death Metal 101: The History of Death Metal". Loudwire.
- Wiederhorn, Jon (June 18, 2019). "Florida Death Metal's Gory Rise, Groundbreaking Reign: Definitive Oral History". Revolver.
