= Undercroft (band) =

Undercroft is a Chilean thrash/death metal band formed in 1991. Blabbermouth considers them a "cult" act in the genre. Metal Hammer compared their sound to early releases by Sepultura. The site said that their later albums had elements of black metal, aa well as "grinding death metal" in the vein of Autopsy. Undercroft have shared the stage with acts such as German thrash metal band Kreator, Florida death metal band Morbid Angel and Swedish symphonic metal band Therion. They signed to French independent record label Season of Mist in 2012.

== Discography ==
- ...To the Final Battle (1993)
- Demons Awake, Revenge Is Near (1994)
- Twisted Souls (1995)
- BoneBreaker (1996)
- Redemolition (1998)

== Band members ==
- Tito Merlin
- Marco Medina
- Rodrigo Oneto
