= Terrified =

Terrified may refer to:

- Terrified (Quiet Riot album), 1993
- Terrified (Fakemink album), 2026
- "Terrified" (Childish Gambino song), 2017
- Terrified (Blink-182 song), 2023
- "Terrified", a song by Anacrusis from Reason, 1990
- "Terrified", a song by Inspection 12 from Get Rad, 2003
- "Terrified", a song by Rainer Maria from Catastrophe Keeps Us Together, 2006
- "Terrified", a song by Story of the Year from The Black Swan, 2008
- "Terrified", a song by Rage from Carved in Stone, 2008
- "Terrified", a song by Anna Ternheim from Leaving on a Mayday, 2008
- "Terrified", a song by Zebra & Giraffe from The Inside, 2010
- "Terrified", a song by Katharine McPhee from Unbroken, 2010
- "Terrified", a song by Rotten Sound from Cursed, 2011
- "Terrified", a song by Atreyu from In Our Wake, 2018
- "Terrified", a song by Guster from Look Alive, 2019
- "Terrified", a song by Terror Jr from Unfortunately, Terror Jr, 2019
- Terrified (film), a 2017 Argentine horror film
