= Paul Miles =

Paul Miles may refer to:

== Musicians ==
- Paul Miles, vocalist & banjo player for the late-1920s / early-1930s string band The Red Fox Chasers
- Paul Miles, American drummer who played on the album Screams and Whispers album by the band Anacrusis
- Paul Miles, American guitarist who co-wrote & played on the album Zoon by the band The Nefilim

== Others ==
- Paul Miles (politician) (born 1963), member of the Western Australian Legislative Assembly
- Paul Miles (American football) (born 1952), American football running back
- Paul Miles, author of the book Sex Tips from Rock Stars

== See also ==
- Paul Miles-Kingston (born 1972), British opera singer
