= Human (Death album) =

Studio album by Death
- Released: October 22, 1991
- Recorded: May 1991
- Studios: Morrisound Recording, Tampa, Florida
- Genres: Technical death metal; progressive metal
- Length: 34:21
- Labels: Relativity (United States), Roadrunner (Europe/International)
- Producers: Scott Burns, Chuck Schuldiner

Death chronology
Spiritual Healing (1990)	Human (1991)	Fate: The Best of Death (1992)

Human is the fourth studio album by American death metal band Death, released on October 22, 1991, by Relativity Records in the United States, while on Roadrunner Records in Europe/Internationally. This is the only album to feature Cynic members Paul Masvidal on guitar and Sean Reinert on drums, and the first to feature bassist Steve Di Giorgio. The album continued the band's evolution on Spiritual Healing, featuring high technicality and introspective lyrics. It is today regarded as one of Death's greatest albums and one of the most influential technical death metal albums of all time.

== Background and release ==
After the release of Spiritual Healing, band members Bill Andrews and Terry Butler embarked on a tour of Europe without frontman Chuck Schuldiner, who refused to go on tour due to what he perceived as poor organization. Their decision to tour without him would result in legal action brought by Schuldiner, and Schuldiner's decision to switch to using guest musicians on future releases.

According to Guitar World, "Chuck had never needed an excuse to fight for his music. Now handed one, he responded with devastating force. Human, his followup to Spiritual Healing, was a calculated retaliation to his former bandmates, who claimed he was washed up; to the media, which painted him as a narcissistic monster; and to anyone deluded enough to believe his detractors. 'This is much more than a record to me,' he told Metal Hammer’s Robert Heeg in the December 1991 issue. 'It is a statement. It’s revenge.'"

Bassist Steve Di Giorgio left after the recording of the album (though he would later return to record Individual Thought Patterns). He was replaced by Scott Carino, who toured with the band in 1991 and 1992. Carino also recorded additional bass overdub on "Cosmic Sea" after a couple of issues were discovered during the mixing stage. The rest of the song (including the bass solo) was recorded by Di Giorgio.

The album was recorded at Morrisound Recording in Tampa, Florida and was produced by Scott Burns.

== Music and lyrics ==
In some ways, the three of us around Chuck made for a fusion of East Coast meets West Coast sensibilities outside the metal box. We were steeped in seventies and eighties progressive rock, jazz and other eclectic sounds blending with Chuck's old-school metal leanings to become a groovy hybrid of progressive death metal was unheard of back then. His trademark use of the harmonic minor scale was still intact, along with the classic metal riffing, but in seeking out a new breed of musicians, Chuck was getting the best of both worlds by appealing to classic metal heads while maintaining a speed and heaviness for the more extreme metal ear, but also speaking to the more studied listener by introducing a new degree of musicality, aggressive chops and technical prowess.

— Guitarist Paul Masvidal in 2011, as quoted from the liner notes of the deluxe reissue of Human

Human marked the beginning of a major stylistic change for Death, being more technically complex and progressive than the band's previous efforts. The sound has been categorized as technical death metal and progressive metal. Shaun Lindsley of Metal Hammer said Human was an "exponential leap forward in innovation" for the band. Chris Krovatin of Kerrang! assessed, "On the one hand, the album sees Death, arguably the genre's birth mother, exploring progressive sonic ground and lyrical themes that were completely new for them, much less any other artist within this branch of music. On the other hand, naming your album Human – after the ultimate symbol of frailty in death metal, whose destruction, demise, and sheer repulsiveness are the subject of most great death metal songs – has a reductive brilliance to it."

Described as a "swirling, progressive shred-fest," the album makes use of odd time signatures and complex rhythms. Session musicians Sean Reinert and Paul Masvidal, who had performed in Cynic, were influenced by progressive rock, jazz and jazz fusion. Masvidal employed shred-style guitar solos that have been described as "paradigm-shifting." Some of the textures on the album have been described as "spacy." Masvidal explained: "Although we all brought our backgrounds to the equation, none of us really knew what we were doing. We simply did what came naturally in the context of Chuck's songs and that's why it worked. Our detachment about the process eliminated preciousness and pretense. It wasn't that we didn't take the music seriously, because we did, but there was a playful psychology along the way."

Joe DiVita of Loudwire said the album contains "complex melodies" accompanied by "hook-bound grooves." Additionally, the album contains melodic guitar riffs that are reminiscent of the New wave of British heavy metal, and have drawn comparisons to Iron Maiden. Steve Huey of AllMusic described Chuck Schuldiner's harmonized guitar riffs as "strange" and "dissonant", and argued the album's back side is "actually almost subdued by death metal standards." Marcus Jervis of About.com assessed, "Although firmly rooted in death metal, by this stage of its career, Death had little in common with the gore drenched grind of Cannibal Corpse or the satanic blast beats of Deicide, instead choosing to explore increasingly progressive avenues, expanding the boundaries of what was considered possible in death metal." The track "Cosmic Sea" is an instrumental that emphasizes Di Giorgio's heavy metal bass playing.

Schuldiner's lyrics on the album explore themes such as existentialism, abuse of power, and betrayal. Paul Masvidal assessed: "A large degree of Chuck's creative energy was driven by an unsettled conscience. As it is for many musicians, writing songs was a cathartic outlet and a way to touch earth, ground himself and process his pain. With Human, Chuck's lyrics began looking inward and somewhat prophetically to his own untimely departure."

== Reception and legacy ==
Professional ratings
Review scores
Source	Rating
About.com	4/5 stars
AllMusic	4.5/5 stars
Collector's Guide to Heavy Metal	7/10
Exclaim!	favourable
Kerrang!	4/5 stars

Human was released to critical acclaim, and has since been commended as a "masterpiece" in death metal. Additionally, it is considered to be a highly influential release in the development of the technical death metal subgenre, and on extreme metal in general. In 2017, Rolling Stone named the album the 70th greatest metal album of all time. In 2012, Noisecreep said Human was "a watershed metal album, and the most progressive death metal album ever released up to th[at] point."

According to Matt Mills of WhatCulture, Human "singlehandedly gave credence to the “technical death metal” niche, while also signalling that Death had fully spread their wings beyond what was first thought possible." Gregg Pratt of Exclaim! said "the one-two opening punch of "Flattening of Emotions" and "Suicide Machine" is easily one of the best double-hitter openings of a death metal album [in 1991], and the competition was stiff." According to Marcus Jervis at About.com, Human "was undeniable proof that extreme metal was capable of being about something more than angry kids pretending to worship the devil. It was crushing but cerebral and the precursor to an era where technicality is seen as a given in extreme metal." Steve Huey of AllMusic gave the album four and a half stars out of five.

Human is a highly influential extreme metal album, according to Jeff Wagner in his 2010 text on progressive metal, Mean Deviation. It is Death's best-selling album, having sold 94,000 copies with the U.S., according to Soundscan. It was ranked number 82 on the October 2006 issue of Guitar World magazine's list of the greatest 100 guitar albums of all time. The track "Lack of Comprehension" has an accompanying music video, which received airplay on MTV.

In 2011, Relapse Records and Perseverance Holdings Ltd. re-issued the album to commemorate the 20th anniversary of the original release. This edition was remixed by Jim Morris of Morrisound Recording Studios, includes bonus tracks, and was authorized by Schuldiner intellectual property lawyer Eric Greif. The reissue of Human was remixed, as Sony had lost the master tapes of Scott Burns' original mixes.

In 2025, Joe DiVita of Loudwire named Human as the best death metal release of 1991, calling it "a rare glimpse at death metal perfection."

Loudwire considers it to be among the most essential metal releases of the 1990s for vinyl collectors.

== Track listing ==
All songs written by Chuck Schuldiner except where noted.

No.	Title	Length
1.	"Flattening of Emotions"	4:28
2.	"Suicide Machine"	4:23
3.	"Together as One"	4:10
4.	"Secret Face"	4:39
5.	"Lack of Comprehension"	3:43
6.	"See Through Dreams"	4:39
7.	"Cosmic Sea" (instrumental)	4:27
8.	"Vacant Planets"	3:52
Total length:		34:21

Japanese bonus track
No.	Title	Length
9.	"God of Thunder" (Paul Stanley) (Kiss cover)	4:00
Total length:		38:21

2011 reissued Relapse Records version (bonus disc 1)
No.	Title	Length
1.	"Flattening of Emotions" (basic instrumental studio tracks)	4:54
2.	"Suicide Machine" (basic instrumental studio tracks)	4:30
3.	"Together as One" (basic instrumental studio tracks)	4:15
4.	"Secret Face" (basic instrumental studio tracks)	2:02
5.	"Secret Face - Part 2" (basic instrumental studio tracks)	2:44
6.	"Lack of Comprehension" (basic instrumental studio tracks)	3:46
7.	"Felt Good" (studio snippet)	0:14
8.	"See Through Dreams" (basic instrumental studio tracks)	1:37
9.	"See Through Dreams - Part 2" (basic instrumental studio tracks)	3:03
10.	"Vacant Planets" (basic instrumental studio tracks)	3:59
11.	"Cosmic Sea" (basic instrumental studio tracks)	2:13
12.	"Cosmic Sea - Part 2" (basic instrumental studio tracks)	2:03
13.	"God of Thunder" (basic instrumental studio tracks)	4:05
14.	"Flattening of Emotions" ("Human" demos)	4:26
15.	"Lack of Comprehension" ("Human" demos)	3:48
16.	"Suicide Machine" ("Human" demos)	4:31
17.	"Together as One" ("Human" demos)	4:10
18.	"See Through Dreams" ("Human" demos)	4:08
19.	"Secret Face" ("Human" demos)	4:48
20.	"Vacant Planets" ("Human" demos)	3:59
Total length:		71:15

2011 reissued Relapse Records version (bonus disc 2)
No.	Title	Length
1.	"See Through Dreams" (w/ Paul and Sean, Rehearsal January 1991)	4:32
2.	"See Through Dreams" (take 2, w/ Paul and Sean, Rehearsal January 1991)	4:34
3.	"Secret Face" (w/o Paul - 1/2 song, rehearsal January 1991)	2:52
4.	"Secret Face" (take 2, w/o Paul, rehearsal January 1991)	6:32
5.	"Secret Face" (riffs rehearsal January 1991)	3:47
6.	"Flattening of Emotions" (riffs rehearsal January 1991)	3:15
7.	"Lack of Comprehension" (riffs rehearsal January 1991)	2:43
8.	"Lack of Comprehension" (take 2, riffs rehearsal January 1991)	2:42
9.	"Cosmic Sea" (riffs w/ drum machine, rehearsal January 1991)	2:52
10.	"See Through Dreams" (rehearsal August 1990)	4:25
11.	"Suicide Machine" (rehearsal August 1990)	4:42
12.	"Together as One" (rehearsal August 1990)	4:27
13.	"Suicide Machine" (drum & bass tracks)	4:25
14.	"Together as One" (drum & bass tracks)	4:05
15.	"Secret Face" (drum & bass tracks)	4:37
16.	"Lack of Comprehension" (drum & bass tracks)	3:38
17.	"Vacant Planets" (drum & bass tracks)	3:53
Total length:		68:09

== Personnel ==
All information is taken from the CD liner notes of the original 1991 release and the 2011 reissue.

Death

- Chuck Schuldiner – guitars, vocals
- Sean Reinert – drums
- Steve Di Giorgio – bass
- Paul Masvidal – guitars

Additional personnel

- Scott Carino – additional bass (on "Cosmic Sea")
- Bill Andrews – drums (August 1990 rehearsal)
- Terry Butler – bass (August 1990 rehearsal)

Production

- Chuck Schuldiner – production
- Scott Burns – producer, engineer, mixing
- Michael Fuller – mastering (original release)
- Jim Morris – remixing (2011 reissue)
- Alan Douches – mastering (2011 reissue)
- René Miville – artwork
- Tim Hubbard – photography
- David Bett – art direction
- Jacob Speis – layout

== Notes ==
- "God of Thunder" was originally only on the Japanese version of the album but was later included on the 2011 Relapse reissue.
- The track "Cosmic Sea" is featured in the computer game Damage Incorporated.
- The band paid homage in the liner notes to Atheist bassist Roger Patterson, who was killed in a car accident in February 1991.
- The band's logo changes slightly; compared to the logo on the three preceding albums, it loses the "intricate details" that it had previously.
- Schuldiner has stated that the song "Lack of Comprehension" is based on the scandal regarding metal band Judas Priest, where it was accused of causing a fan to commit suicide.
