= Suffering Hour =

Studio album by Anacrusis
- Released: 1988
- Recorded: March 20–25, 1988
- Studio: Holly Hills Studios, Kansas City
- Genre: Thrash metal, progressive metal, technical thrash metal
- Length: 47:10
- Label: Active
- Producer: Anacrusis & Jeff Johnson

Anacrusis chronology
Suffering Hour (1988)	Reason (1990)

Professional ratings
Review scores
Source	Rating
AllMusic	2.5/5 stars
Metal Forces	(8.5/10)

Suffering Hour is the first album by the American thrash/progressive metal band Anacrusis, released in 1988 on the European label Active Records. The album's recording was self-financed by the band members with $1,200.

The album was re-released on CD in 1990 by Metal Blade Records.

== Track listing ==
Music and lyrics by Kenn Nardi, except where indicated

1. "Present Tense" (Nardi, Kevin Heidbreder, Tom Liskey) – 6:22
2. "Imprisoned" – 6:11
3. "R.O.T." (Nardi, Heidbreder) – 4:51
4. "Butcher's Block" – 6:07
5. "A World to Gain" – 4:04
6. "Frigid Bitch" (Heidbreder) – 4:03
7. "Fighting Evil" – 3:25
8. "Twisted Cross" – 7:20
9. "Annihilation Complete/Disembowled" (Heidbreder/Nardi, John Emery) – 4:41

== Personnel ==
- Kenn Nardi – guitars, lead vocals
- Kevin Heidbreder – guitars
- John Emery – bass
- Mike Owen – drums, backing vocals
