= Speed Metal (compilation) =

Compilation album by various artists
- Released: 1991
- Recorded: 1988–1991
- Genre: Thrash metal, speed metal, heavy metal
- Length: 43:10
- Label: Priority Records

Professional ratings
Review scores
| Source | Rating |
|---|---|
| AllMusic | 4.5/5 stars |

Speed Metal is a budget-priced compilation of popular previously released songs in the thrash and speed metal genres, released by Priority Records (known for being a predominantly hip hop label) in 1991.

== Critical response ==
Stephen Thomas Erlewine of AllMusic wrote: "For a budget-priced ten-track collection, Speed Metal is actually a pretty good sampler of the state of the genre circa 1991. The collection doesn't strictly play by the rules, including cuts such as Motorhead's 'Ace of Spades,' which were undeniably influential but not speed metal per se. Neverthelesss, this is a reasonably effective overview, considering its price, containing cuts by Testament, Death Angel, Flotsam & Jetsam, Metal Church, Excel, Anacrusis and Pantera."

== Track listing ==
1. Trial by Fire (Testament)
2. Road Mutants (Death Angel)
3. Suffer the Masses (Flotsam and Jetsam)
4. Prayer for the Dying (Mind Over Four)
5. Questions (Ignorance)
6. Ace of Spades (Live) (Motörhead)
7. Badlands (Metal Church)
8. Cowboys from Hell (Pantera)
9. Blaze Some Hate (Excel)
10. Terrified (Anacrusis)
