= Grotesque Wedlock =

Studio album by Dr. Shrinker
- Released: 1993
- Genre: Death metal
- Length: 1:08:39
- Label: Necroharmonic Productions

Dr. Shrinker chronology
Split 7-inch EP (1992)	Grotesque Wedlock (1993)

Grotesque Wedlock is a compilation of Dr. Shrinker's three studio demos.

1-12 are from Wedding The Grotesque Demo 1989

13-14 are from The Eponym Demo 1990 (produced by Eric Greif)

15-19 are from Recognition Demo 1988

NOTE: The 2013 reissue includes a hidden track "Our Necropsy" after the song Germ Farm.

== Critical reception ==
Stefan Franke of Voices from the Darkside wrote that the compilation "easily tops many of today’s releases!!!"

== Track listing ==
1. "Tools of The Trade" - 3:32
2. "Mesmerization (of A Corpse)" - 4:56
3. "Fungus" - 4:01
4. "Rawhead Rex" - 4:14
5. "Cerebral Seizure" - 3:06
6. "Dead By Dawn" - 4:01
7. "Open-Heart Surgery" - 3:28
8. "No Way To Live" - 3:47
9. "Pronounced Dead" - 5:39
10. "Chunk Blower" - 4:04
11. "Bacterial Encroachment" - 4:38
12. "Wedding The Grotesque" - 1:53
13. "Tighten The Tourniquet" - 4:32
14. "Germ Farm" - 4:46
15. "The Command" - 1:22
16. "March of The Undead" - 3:02
17. "Graphic Violence" - 3:58
18. "Inverted Direction" - 1:41
19. "Free At Lasssst!!!" - 1:59
