= Elements (Atheist album) =

Studio album by Atheist
- Released: August 30, 1993
- Recorded: May 1993
- Studios: Pro Media Studios, Gainesville, Florida
- Genres: Progressive metal; technical death metal; jazz fusion
- Length: 41:43
- Labels: Music for Nations, Metal Blade
- Producers: Atheist, Mark Pinske

Atheist chronology
Unquestionable Presence (1991)	Elements (1993)	Unquestionable Presence: Live at Wacken (2009)

Elements is the third studio album released by Florida technical death metal band Atheist, released on August 30, 1993, by Music for Nations in Europe and by Metal Blade Records in the US.

Elements was Atheist's last studio album for 17 years, until the 2010 release of Jupiter. The album was reissued by Relapse Records in 2005 and was digitally remastered with the addition of six bonus tracks. The album was reissued by Season of Mist in 2015 and included the six bonus tracks and an additional DVD.

== Background ==
Elements was written, recorded and mixed in forty days in Pro Media Studios. Atheist desired to disband, but they were required to complete their junior album in order to fulfill a contract to their record label. Elements features the addition of a third guitarist, Frank Emmi. Initially, Rand Burkey was not going to appear on the album, and as Kelly Shaefer had developed carpal tunnel syndrome, preventing him from playing anything but rhythm guitar, a new lead guitar player was needed. Before recording, Burkey rejoined the band, and thus the band ended up with three guitarists. Shaefer plays rhythm guitar, while Emmi and Burkey share responsibilities for leads and solos.

== Musical style ==
Eduardo Rivadavia described the album for Allmusic as remaining "admirably true to the band's famously complicated arrangements, syncopated rhythms, and ultra-precise attack, but also boast[ing] a cleaner musicality never before attempted by the group".

== Critical reception ==
Professional ratings
Review scores
Source	Rating
Allmusic	4/5 stars
Terrorizer	9/10

Elements was described by James Hinchcliffe in Terrorizer as "less frantic and jazz-leaning than Unquestionable Presence, and packed with unexpectedly Latin rhythms" that caused the album to "hurtle...to the edge of metal". Rivadavia praised the band for "delivering another highly accomplished set that illustrated both a natural evolution of their sound and served as a worthy final chapter to their all-too-brief and very troubled trajectory".

== Track listing ==
No.	Title	Writer(s)	Length
1.	"Green"	Kelly Shaefer, Frank Emmi, Tony Choy, Rand Burkey	3:21
2.	"Water"	Shaefer, Emmi, Choy, Burkey	4:27
3.	"Samba Briza"	Choy	1:57
4.	"Air"	Burkey, Shaefer, Emmi, Choy	5:32
5.	"Displacement"	Burkey	1:23
6.	"Animal"	Emmi, Shaefer, Choy, Burkey	4:10
7.	"Mineral"	Choy, Emmi, Shaefer, Burkey	4:32
8.	"Fire"	Shaefer, Choy, Emmi, Burkey	4:36
9.	"Fractal Point"	Burkey	0:43
10.	"Earth"	Burkey, Shaefer, Emmi, Choy	3:41
11.	"See You Again"	Emmi	1:16
12.	"Elements"	Choy, Burkey, Shaefer, Emmi	5:35
Total length:			41:43

=== 2005 re-release ===
In 2005, Relapse Records re-released Elements. This edition was digitally remastered, and features six bonus tracks.

Live BBC Radio Broadcast (1992)

No.	Title	Writer(s)	Length
13.	"Unquestionable Presence"	Shaefer, Steve Flynn, Burkey, Roger Patterson	4:02
14.	"On They Slay"	Shaefer	3:47
15.	"Enthralled in Essence"	Shaefer, Flynn, Burkey, Patterson	4:31
16.	"The Formative Years"	Shaefer, Flynn, Burkey, Patterson	3:38
17.	"Mother Man"	Shaefer, Flynn, Burkey, Patterson, Choy	4:32
18.	"Retribution"	Shaefer, Flynn, Burkey, Patterson	3:11
Total length:			65:30

=== 2015 re-release ===
In 2015, Season of Mist re-released the album, which includes the six bonus tracks previously added to the CD, as well as an additional 90-minute DVD, which includes Live in Holland, on June 10, 1993, Live in Montreal on January 16, 1992, Live in Chicago in January 1992 and an interview from January 16, 1992.

== Personnel ==
- Kelly Shaefer − lead vocals, rhythm guitar
- Rand Burkey − lead guitar
- Frank Emmi − lead guitar
- Tony Choy − bass
- Josh Greenbaum − drums, congas (track 3)

Guest musician

- David Smadbeck - piano (track 3)

Personnel on 2005 re-release bonus live tracks

- Kelly Shaefer - vocals, rhythm guitar
- Rand Burkey - lead guitar
- Darren McFarland - bass
- Steve Flynn - drums

== Production ==
- Atheist - production
- Mark Pinske - production, engineering, mixing
- Shawn Camner - engineering
- Kelly Shaefer - mixing
