= Reason (Anacrusis album) =

Studio album by Anacrusis
- Released: February 16, 1990
- Recorded: August–September 1989
- Studio: Smith Lee Studios, St. Louis
- Genre: Thrash metal, technical thrash metal, progressive metal
- Length: 52:45/64:17
- Label: Active
- Producer: Anacrusis

Anacrusis chronology
Suffering Hour (1988)	Reason (1990)	Manic Impressions (1991)

Professional ratings
Review scores
Source	Rating
AllMusic	3/5 stars
Sputnikmusic	3.5/5

Reason is the second album by the American thrash/progressive metal band Anacrusis, released in 1990 on the European label Active Records. The album and their debut Suffering Hour were re-recorded for a two-disc set titled Hindsight: Suffering Hour & Reason Revisited, released in 2010.

== Track listing ==
Music and lyrics by Kenn Nardi, except where indicated

1. "Stop Me" – 6:22
2. "Terrified" (Nardi, Kevin Heidbreder) – 4:55
3. "Not Forgotten" (Nardi, John Emery) – 5:51
4. "Wrong" – 5:40
5. "Silent Crime" – 4:51
6. "Misshapen Intent" (Nardi, Heidbreder) – 4:25
7. "Afraid to Feel" (Nardi, Heidbreder) – 6:25
8. "Child Inside" – 4:25
9. "Vital" (Nardi, Heidbreder) – 5:10
10. "Quick to Doubt" – 4:41
11. "Killing My Mind" (CD bonus track) – 5:53
12. "Injustice" (CD bonus track) – 5:39

== Personnel ==
- Kenn Nardi – guitars, lead vocals
- Kevin Heidbreder – guitars
- John Emery – bass
- Mike Owen – drums, backing vocals
