= Rude Squad =

American ska punk band

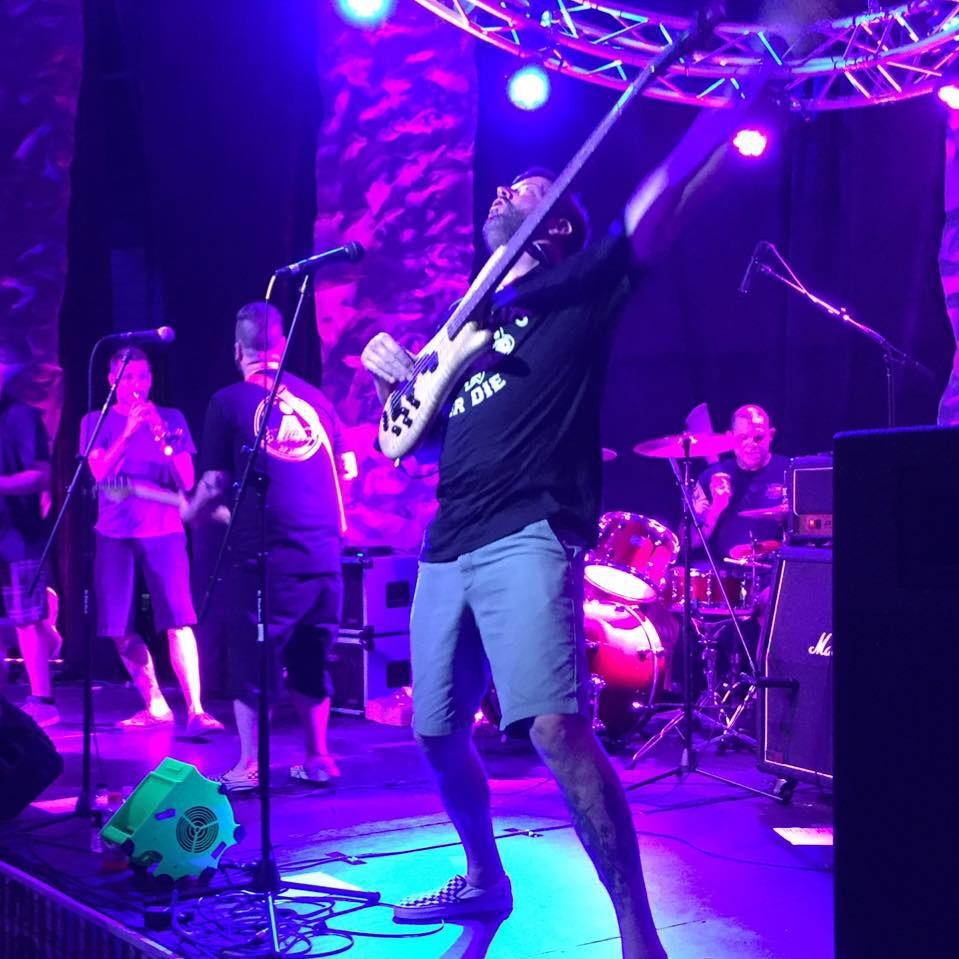
- Rude Squad live in 2017

Background information
- Origin: St. Petersburg, Florida, United States
- Genres: Ska punk, Punk rock
- Years active: 1997 - present
- Label: Citrus Records Octave Match Records
- Members: Rusch Young; Lee McElhaney; Kyle Sokol; Eric Best; Adrian Baptist
- Past members: Alex Trellu; Chip Manger; Matt Hollingsworth; Paul DeCosmo; Steve DeCosmo; Alden Kooken
- Website: Official website

Rude Squad is an American ska punk band founded in St. Petersburg, Florida, United States, in 1997. The final and longest running band line up are: Eric Best (vocals & guitar), Lee McElhaney (sax), Rusch Young (trumpet), Kyle Sokol (bass), and Adrian Baptist (drums). Rude Squad have cited Fishbone, The Toasters, Goldfinger and The Police as inspirations for their work. They are the longest running active ska band in the Tampa Bay area according to Creative Loafing.

Rude Squad has formed their own legacy by playing as a subset, using the sax, guitar, drums, trumpet and lethal vocals as the combination needed to create the elements in the ska genre. They have performed with multiple bands such as Rancid, the Skatalites, Suicide Machines, the Used, The Pietasters, Voodoo Glow Skulls, Matisyahu, Springfield Cubs, and 311. They have also taken part and participated in events throughout the state and beyond such as Vans Warped Tour '04, 97X's Next Big Thing, 98 Rock's Livestock, and numerous local events throughout the Bay area. Rude Squad signed a record deal with Octave Match Records in 2010.

Rude Squad has reformed after their recent reunion show on November 23, 2013 to a sold out crowd at the Local 662 in their hometown of St. Petersburg, Florida. Rude Squad also signed to Citrus Records on 16 October 2014 after being released from their old contract with Octave Match Records.

== Band line-up ==
=== Current Line-Up ===
- Lee McElhaney - Sax (The New Rulers)
- Rusch Young - Trumpet
- Kyle Sokol - Bass (Nasty Savage, Nocturnus AD, Astronomica, Apeiron Bound, Blackkout, Messiaxx, Eric Best Solo)
- Eric Best - Vocals, Guitar (Brosef Skalin, Solo)
- Adrian Baptist - Drums (Pig Pen, Slade and the Wasters)

=== Former members ===
- Steve De Cosmo - Back-up Vocals
- Chip Manger - Bass
- Alex Trellu - Bass
- Paul De Cosmo - Drums
- Matt Hollingsworth - Drums
- Alden Kooken - Sax
- Jason Rodriguez - Drums

== Discography ==
- Self Titled EP - 2000
- No Practice - 2002
- Unwrapped - 2004
- On the Edge of Failure - Octave Match Records - 2010
- Closer Than You - Florida Ska Compilation - Citrus records - 2014

== Other sources ==
- Rude Squad with Voodoo Glow Skulls co-headlining show "Rude Squad with VooDoo Glow Skulls" September 26, 2017.
- Official Press Release for Rude Squad Record Deal Signing "Official Press Release Rude Squad Signs Record Contract" March 10, 2010.
- Closer Than You Florida Ska Compilation featuring Rude Squad 2014
