= Manic Impressions =

Studio album by Anacrusis
- Released: May 1, 1991
- Recorded: Royal Recorders, Lake Geneva, Wisconsin, January–February 1991
- Genres: Progressive metal, technical thrash metal
- Length: 52:44
- Label: Metal Blade/Warner Bros.
- Producer: Kenn Nardi

Anacrusis chronology
Reason (1990)	Manic Impressions (1991)	Screams and Whispers (1993)

Professional ratings
Review scores
Source	Rating
AllMusic	4.5/5 stars
Sputnikmusic	5/5 stars

Manic Impressions is the third studio album by the American thrash/progressive metal band Anacrusis. The album was remastered and reissued in 1999.

In 2005, Manic Impressions was ranked number 131 in Rock Hard magazine's book The 500 Greatest Rock & Metal Albums of All Time.

== Track listing ==
1. "Paint a Picture" (Kenn Nardi) – 5:58
2. "I Love the World" (Robert Heaton, Justin Sullivan) – 4:49 (New Model Army cover)
3. "Something Real" (Nardi) – 5:59
4. "Dream Again" (Nardi, John Emery) – 3:20
5. "Explained Away" (Nardi, Emery, Kevin Heidbreder) – 6:01
6. "Still Black" (Nardi, Heidbreder) – 6:08
7. "What You Became" (Nardi) – 5:10
8. "Our Reunion" (Nardi, Heidbreder) – 4:53
9. "Idle Hours" (Nardi, Emery) – 4:36
10. "Far Too Long" (Nardi, Emery, Heidbreder) – 5:50

== Personnel ==
- Kenn Nardi – guitars, vocals
- Kevin Heidbreder – guitars
- John Emery – bass
- Chad Smith – drums
