= Martin Greif =

American editor, lecturer, publisher and writer

Martin Joel Greif (February 4, 1938, The Bronx, New York City - November 17, 1996, Cork, Ireland) was an American editor, lecturer, publisher and writer. He was the uncle of heavy metal music personality and lawyer Eric Greif.

== Background ==
Son of an immigrant Harlem grocery store owner, Martin Greif graduated from Stuyvesant High School and was further educated at Hunter College, NYC, graduating in 1959 (B.A. cum laude) and Princeton University, graduating in 1961 (M.A. with honours), where he was a Woodrow Wilson Fellow and groomed as an expert in Daniel Defoe. After graduation he became a professor of English and taught in NY universities from 1963 to 1973, including lecturing in biblical literature at New York University, before entering the world of publishing as managing editor of Time-Life Books (1969–73), and then as co-founder and editorial director of Main Street Press. Main Street Press was founded in 1978 by Greif and his life partner, Lawrence Grow, in Clinton, New Jersey. Their first office was on Main Street in Clinton, hence the name. Both men had enjoyed successful publishing careers in Manhattan but wanted to move to the country for the wide, open spaces and the lower costs. Subsequently, the business moved to nearby Pittstown, New Jersey. Main Street specialized in publishing books on Americana, crafts and restoration. However, their biggest publishing success was the Vogue magazine spoof Dogue (1986), featuring modeling canines and billed as "a parody of the world's most famous fashion magazine".

== American career ==
Martin Greif's popular book, "The Gay Book of Days" (1982)

Martin Greif became an author and book editor. His more than a dozen books range from Depression Modern: The Thirties Style in America (1975), a photo study of 1930s American design, predominantly architecture, that sought to define a wider, more American definition of Art Deco; Aunt Sammy's Radio Recipes (1975); The New Industrial Landscape: The Story of the Austin Company (1978); The Morning Stars Sang: The Bible in Folk Art (1978); The Airport Book: From Landing Field to Modern Terminal (1979); The Lighting Book: A Buyer's Guide to Locating Almost Every Kind of Lighting Device (1986); and The World of Tomorrow: The 1939 New York World's Fair (1988).

Greif is most well known for The Gay Book of Days (1982). The book was an attempt to catalogue as many notable and nonnotable gay men and lesbians as possible throughout history.

Greif and Grow also wrote a few books using different, sometimes female, nom de plumes - Jean Bach, Frederick S. Copely, Martin Lawrence and Leona Wesley Hunter.

== Irish years ==
"Celtic Tales of Terror" (1997), one of several Irish-themed works for Sterling Publishing (written as Mairtin O'Griofa), that came out after Greif's death

Greif was often asked to write an updated version of the Book of Days, to which he gave considerable thought during the 1990s, but he never got beyond the planning stages.

Martin Greif and Larry Grow spent their latter years in the vicinity of Ballinadee, County Cork, Ireland, where they set up Orchard Hill Press in a deal with Sterling Publishing of NYC. Greif's last works were several books on chess and puzzles, and Irish-themed titles written as Mairtin O'Griofa.

Grow died of a stroke associated with AIDS in 1991. Greif died of an AIDS-related illness in November 1996 at Cork University Hospital.

Greif's nephew was Eric Greif, a lawyer and entertainment personality known first for a management career within the heavy metal musical genre in the 1980s and later within the legal profession.
