= Neurotica (band) =

American heavy metal band

- Origin: Sarasota, Florida, U.S.
- Genres: Heavy metal, hard rock, nu metal
- Years active: c. 1995–2002
- Labels: Newtown Music, Koch Records/E1 Music, SmackDown! Records
- Past members: Kelly Shaefer; Shawn Bowen; Louis Polito; G. J. Gosman; Clay Yeagley; Migwell Przybyl; Chris Rollo; Jason West

Neurotica was a heavy metal band, started around 1995 by singer Kelly Shaefer (formerly of progressive death metal band Atheist) and guitarist Shawn Bowen. Performances in local clubs brought the band to the attention of AC/DC singer and Sarasota resident Brian Johnson, who helped them find a management deal and produced their debut album, Seed. The album was not a success, but the follow-up, Living in Dog Years, also produced by Johnson, and now featuring bassist Migwell Przybyl, was more impressive and earned the band a major-label deal with the WWF's SmackDown! Records.

After further line-up changes and a move towards nu metal, the band's third album, Neurotica, was issued in 2002, composed mainly of updated versions of tracks from their debut. In the same year the band was included on the Ozzfest tour. They split up later that year after being dropped by SmackDown! Records. Shaefer subsequently auditioned for Drowning Pool as a replacement for Dave Williams, but would form a new band, Starrfactory, in 2003, before reforming Atheist in 2006. Schaefer also auditioned for Velvet Revolver, but ultimately lost the gig to Scott Weiland from Stone Temple Pilots.

== Discography ==
- Seed (1998) Newtown Music
- Living in Dog Years (1999) Newtown Music
- Neurotica (2002) Smackdown/Koch International
