= Nasty Savage =

American thrash metal band

- Origin: Brandon, Florida, U.S.
- Genre: Thrash metal
- Years active: 1982–1990; 2002–2012; 2016–present
- Labels: Metal Blade; Crook'd Records
- Members: Ronnie Galletti; Jim Coker; Pete Sykes; Dave Orman; Kyle Sokol
- Past members: Ben Meyer; Dave Austin

Nasty Savage is an American thrash metal band formed in Brandon, Florida, in 1983 by vocalist "Nasty" Ronnie Galletti. The band has undergone various lineup changes. Galletti and guitarist David Austin were the only constant members until the latter's departure in 2022. The band are regarded as early death metal pioneers.

== History ==
The band was formed in 1983. That year, the band recorded a demo tape and signed to Metal Blade Records, where they would record their eponymous first album.

Nasty Savage became popular due to singer "Nasty" Ronnie Galetti's over-the-top stage antics, such as smashing a television set over his head, that typically left the set covered in blood The band's second album, Indulgence (1987), featuring the hit single "XXX", was recorded at Progressive Music in Tampa. After releasing three albums and one EP between 1985 and 1989, they broke up. After speculation about a reunion, their fourth studio album, Psycho Psycho, was released in the spring of 2004. The band played occasional live shows before disbanding again in 2012. In January 2016, it was reported that Nasty Savage had reformed and were working on their fifth studio album, Jeopardy Room. It progressed slowly for nearly a decade before its release on October 4, 2024.

== Musical style ==
While the band initially was influenced by the new wave of British heavy metal (NWOBHM), upon the addition of their second guitarist Ben Meyer, the band's sound began to change towards a style influenced by thrash metal, punk and proto-death metal with a progressive and technical edge. Meyer recalled, "We started developing intricate and unusual time changes, signature riffs and using diminished scales, we tried to make it so that each guitar was doing some different."

== Legacy ==
Nasty Savage were extremely influential in the emergence of the Florida death metal scene, inspiring bands such as Death and Obituary.

== Band members ==
=== Current ===
- "Nasty" Ronnie Galletti – lead vocals (1983–1990, 2002–2012, 2016–present)
- Jim Coker – drums (2002–2003, 2016–present)
- Pete Sykes – lead guitar, backing vocals (2018–present)
- Dave Orman – rhythm guitar, backing vocals (2022–present)
- Kyle Sokol – bass (2024–present)

=== Former ===
- Fred Dregischan – bass (1983–1985)
- Ben Meyer – lead guitar (1983–1990, 2002–2012)
- Demian Gordon – lead guitar (2016–2018)
- Dezso Istvan – bass (1985–1987)
- Chris Moorhouse – bass (1987–1988) (died 1988)
- Richard Bateman – bass (1988–1990, 2002–2012, 2016–2018) (died 2018)
- Curtis Beeson – drums (1983–1990, 2003–2012) (died 2024)
- David Austin – rhythm guitar (1983–1990, 2002–2012, 2016–2022)
- Skotie Carino – bass (2018–2024)

== Discography ==
=== Studio albums ===
- Nasty Savage (1985)
- Indulgence (1987)
- Penetration Point (1989)
- Psycho Psycho (2004)
- Jeopardy Room (2024)

=== Other releases ===
- Wage of Mayhem Demo (1984)
- Live in Brandon Bootleg (1985)
- Abstract Reality EP (1988)
- Wage of Mayhem EP (2002)
- Cleveland 87 Live (2003)
- Wage of Mayhem + Rarities (1983–1985) Compilation (2019)
