= Dr. Shrinker (band) =

American death metal band

- Origin: Milwaukee, Wisconsin
- Genre: Death metal
- Years active: 1987–1991, 2013-present
- Labels: Dread Records, Necroharmonic Productions

Dr. Shrinker is an American death metal band from Milwaukee, Wisconsin, formed in October 1987. The obscure band came to wider attention with the release of a posthumous split EP with Nunslaughter and a discography CD, released in 2004 by Necroharmonic Productions. Three of the group's members (Tony Brandt, Scott McKillop, Matt Grassberger) played in Phantasm, a group similar to Dr. Shrinker, and released their debut album, The Abominable. The band broke up by January 1991, lasting for four years. The band reformed in January 2013.

The Eponym was produced by Eric Greif.

== Band members ==
=== Last known lineup ===
- Jim Potter - guitar
- Jesse Kehoe - drums
- Jason Hellman - bass
- Rich Noonan - vocals

=== Former members ===
- Chad Hensel - guitar (1988-1991)
- James Mayer - drums (1990-1991)
- Tony Brandt - drums (1990)
- Dave Priem - drums (1988-1990)
- Doug Cvetkovich - drums (1987-1988)
- Brian Rehak - drums (2013)
- Matt Grassberger - bass (1987-1990, 1991, 2013-2014)
- Scott McKillop - bass (1990)

== Discography ==
- 1988 - Recognition demo
- 1989 - Wedding the Grotesque demo
- 1990 - The Eponym demo
- 1994 - History of Things to Come Compilation (Growing Deaf Entertainment)
- 2001 - Split 7-inch EP with Nunslaughter (Revenge Productions)
- 2004 - Grotesque Wedlock Compilation of 1988-1990 demos (Necroharmonic Productions)
- 2015 - 1990 Practice Sessions Limited Cassette release (Dread Records)
- 2015 - Contorted Dioramic Palette (Dread Records)
