= Tony Choy =

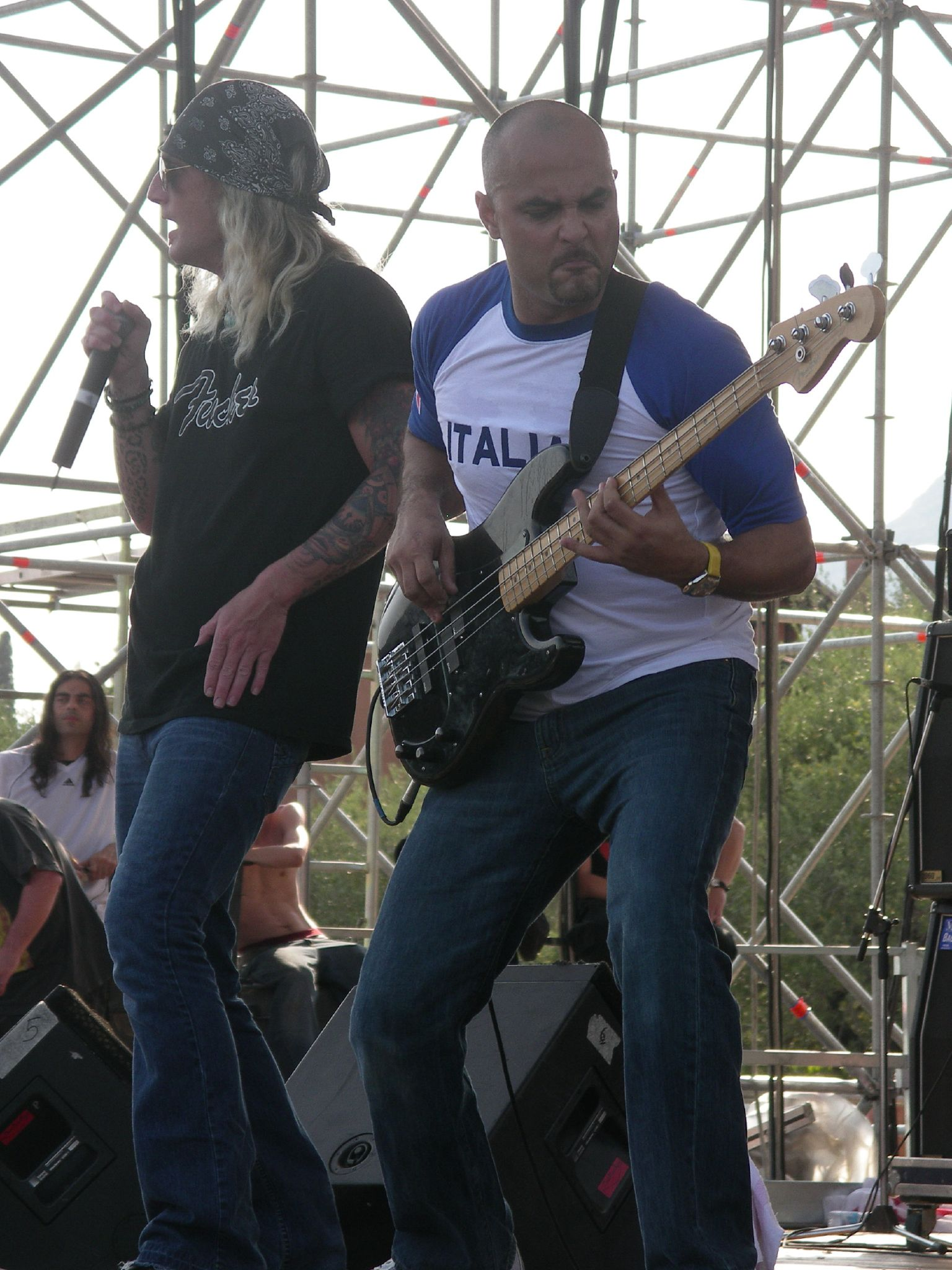
- Tony Choy (right) on stage with Atheist

Background information
- Born: Antonio Choy; June 11, 1971 (age 54); Havana, Cuba
- Genres: Technical death metal; progressive metal; pop
- Occupation: Musician
- Instruments: Bass guitar, vocals, drums
- Website: https://www.tonychoymusic.com

Tony Choy (born June 11, 1971) is a Cuban-American electric bassist. He first joined technical death metal band Cynic, where he played on two demos. After leaving Cynic in 1991 he worked as a session musician for the technical death metal bands Atheist and Pestilence. He is known for his use of the Slap & Pop playing technique, along with two-handed tapping.

He was also the founding member of the Grammy nominated Latin pop group named Area 305.

== Discography ==
- Cynic – "Demo 1990" (1990)
- Cynic – "Roadrunner demo" (1991)
- Atheist – Unquestionable Presence (1991)
- Pestilence – Testimony of the Ancients (1991)
- Atheist – Elements (1993)
- Juan Gabriel – "Por Los Siglos" (2001)
- Area 305 – "Area 305" (2002)
- Area 305 – "Hay Que Cambiar" (2004)
- C-187 – "Collision" (2007)
- Pestilence – Resurrection Macabre (2009)
- Atheist – "Unquestionable Presence: Live At Wacken" (2009)
- Area 305 – "Versión 2.0" (2010)
