= Anacrusis (band) =

American progressive/thrash metal band

Background information
- Origin: St. Louis, Missouri, U.S.
- Genres: Thrash metal; progressive metal; technical thrash metal
- Years active: 1986–1993, 2009–2013, 2019 (one-off reunion)
- Label: Metal Blade Records
- Past members: Kenn Nardi; Kevin Heidbreder; John Emery; Mike Owen; Chad Smith; Paul Miles; Mike Henricks

Anacrusis was an American progressive/thrash metal band from St. Louis, Missouri. Anacrusis was one of the leading bands of technical thrash metal and one of the first to blend the genre with progressive metal. Their albums Manic Impressions and Screams and Whispers are considered as classics of the progressive thrash metal genre.

== History ==
Anacrusis' first demo, Annihilation Complete, was voted Best Demo of 1987 by the readers of Metal Forces magazine and was later included in the publication's Demolition... Scream Your Brains Out! compilation album. This led to a deal with England-based indie Active Records, for whom the group created its first album, Suffering Hour, the following year on a meager $1,200 budget in just under a week. The following Reason album began revealing signs of the band's popular sound. Anacrusis toured in support of the band D.R.I., but without an album released on an American label, drummer Mike Owen left to join the United States Navy shortly after they returned home. Former Heaven's Flame member Chad Smith took over the drums, while the band was eventually signed to the American label Metal Blade Records.

In 1991, Manic Impressions was their first proper studio recorded album, recorded at Royal Recorders in Lake Geneva, Wisconsin. A 38-city U.S. tour supporting Overkill and Galactic Cowboys followed a handful of Midwestern dates opening for Megadeth earlier in the year. After the tour, on returning to St. Louis, they devoted the next few months to writing new material, and after replacing Smith with drummer Paul Miles, work finally began on their 1993 album Screams and Whispers. This was their final album, as the band broke up after its release.

In 2009, the band announced that the original lineup of Kenn Nardi, Kevin Heidbreder, John Emery and Mike Owen would reunite for a performance at the 2010 Keep It True XIII Festival in Germany. Also in 2009, the band released a CD/DVD anthology of early material on Stormspell Records. The package included their 1987 "Annihilation Complete" demo along with other demos, rehearsal recordings and early live footage.

In preparation for their first festival appearance in 17 years, Anacrusis played a reunion gig at T. Billy Buffet's, St. Louis, on April 18, 2010. The show was recorded and filmed for a later release on DVD.

Also in 2010, they released a two-disc set titled Hindsight: Suffering Hour & Reason Revisited, which contains re-recorded versions of their first two albums.

On April 23, 2010, Anacrusis gave a performance at Germany's Keep It True XIII festival at Tauberfrankenhalle in Lauda-Königshofen. Later that year, the band announced they had decided to play more shows.

During the year 2010 the band worked on some new material, but by now just one new song "This Killer in my House" was released on the "Silver Ag47 – Best of Anacrusis" CD.

On February 26, 2011, the band played a headliner show at the Firebird in St. Louis.

On June 12, 2011, Anacrusis played at "Rock Hard Festival" in Germany. The whole festival was filmed by German TV – WDR Rockpalast –, to be broadcast on German television.

The band last played at Skullfest, St. Louis, on June 24–25, 2011, and Alcatraz festival in Belgium, on August 27, 2011.

On July 11, 2019, it was announced that Anacrusis would play a one-off reunion show in December in their home state of Missouri to celebrate the reissue's of all four of their albums with one part of the show being with drummer Mike Owen, one part with Chad Smith, and the last with Paul Miles. Guitarist Mike Henricks will not take part in the reunion. The reunion show was held on December 7, 2019, at Delmar Hall in St. Louis, MO. Tickets were general admission.

== Members ==
=== Last lineup ===
- Kenn Nardi – guitars, vocals (1986–1994, 2009–2013)
- John Emery – bass (1986–1994, 2009–2013)
- Mike Owen – drums (1986–1990, 2009–2013)
- Mike Henricks – guitars (2011–2013)

=== Former members ===
- Kevin Heidbreder – guitars (1986–1994, 2009–2010)
- Chad Smith – drums (1990–1992)
- Paul Miles – drums (1992–1994)

(Note: Chad Smith is not to be confused with the Red Hot Chili Peppers drummer of the same name.)

== Discography ==
=== Studio albums ===
- Suffering Hour (1988)
- Reason (1990)
- Manic Impressions (1991)
- Screams and Whispers (1993)
- Hindsight: Suffering Hour & Reason Revisited (2010) (re-recording album)

All albums except Hindsight are available for download on band website.

=== Compilation albums ===
- Annihilation Complete: The Early Years Anthology (2009)
- Silver (2012)

=== EPs ===
- Excerpts from Reason (1991)

=== Demos ===
- Annihilation Complete (1986)
- Demo I (1986)
- Quick to Doubt (1989) – unauthorized demo

=== Splits ===
- Metal Forces Presents... Demolition – Scream Your Brains Out (1988)

=== DVD ===
- Live @ Mississippi Nights 1993 (2010)
- Our Reunion – Live at St. Louis 2010 (2011)
