= Screams and Whispers =

Thrash/progressive metal album

Studio album by Anacrusis
- Released: May 11, 1993
- Recorded: 1992
- Studios: 48K Audio, St. Louis, Missouri
- Genres: Progressive metal, technical thrash metal
- Length: 62:05
- Label: Metal Blade/Warner Bros.
- Producer: Kenn Nardi

Anacrusis chronology
Manic Impressions (1991)	Screams and Whispers (1993)

Professional ratings
Review scores
Source	Rating
AllMusic	4.5/5 stars
Sputnikmusic	4.55/5 stars

Screams and Whispers is the fourth and final album by the American thrash/progressive metal band Anacrusis, released in 1993.

== Reception ==
Screams and Whispers, much like the preceding album, Manic Impressions, has been hailed as a landmark album for the progressive thrash subgenre. Writing on occasion of the 25th anniversary of the album, Aaron Maltz of Invisible Oranges writes:

"Guitarist, vocalist, and main songwriter Kenn Nardi sang within a dynamic spectrum, employing his voice as more than mindless grunts necessary to round out a track. These approaches allowed them to develop their own aesthetic free from trends, a trait that culminated on their magnum opus, 1993’s Screams & Whispers. While brimming with classic bangers, their final release increased the use of keyboards and cinematic sentiments that stepped away from traditional metal. Ultimately, it may not have made headlines, but its impact continues to resonate in the progressive thrash and metal community."

== Track listing ==
All tracks are written by Kenn Nardi, except where noted.

No.	Title	Music	Length
1.	"Sound the Alarm"		5:36
2.	"Sense of Will"	John Emery, Nardi	4:49
3.	"Too Many Prophets"	Kevin Heidbreder, Nardi	5:26
4.	"Release"		4:16
5.	"Division"	Heidbreder, Nardi	4:32
6.	"Tools of Separation"	Emery, Nardi	6:19
7.	"Grateful"		5:13
8.	"A Screaming Breath"	Emery, Nardi	4:15
9.	"My Soul's Affliction"	Emery, Nardi	4:29
10.	"Driven"	Emery, Heidbreder, Nardi	5:48
11.	"Brotherhood?"		6:49
12.	"Release (remix)"		4:20
Total length:			62:05

== Credits ==
Band members

- Kenn Nardi – vocals, guitars
- Kevin Heidbreder – guitars
- John Emery – bass
- Paul Miles – drums

Production

- Recorded 1992 at 48K Audio, St. Louis, Missouri
- Produced by: Kenn Nardi
- Engineered by: Dave "Fuzzy" Duirnak
- Cover concept: Anacrusis
- Computer manipulation and layout: Greg Schrameyer/Visual Imagineers
- Cover photos: Jennifer Horvath
- Live photos: Harry Pilkerton
- Logo design: Kevin Heidbreder
- Remixed January–February, at MusicHead Recording, Inc., Lake Geneva, Wisconsin
- Remixed by: Kenn Nardi
- Remix engineer: Bill Metoyer
- Assistant engineer: Patrick Murphy
- Mastered by: Eddie Shreyer at Future Disc
