= Piece of Time =

Studio album by Atheist
- Released: August 30, 1989
- Recorded: November–December 1988
- Genre: Technical death metal; thrash metal
- Length: 32:10
- Label: Active
- Producer: Atheist; Scott Burns

Atheist chronology
Piece of Time (1989)	Unquestionable Presence (1991)

Piece of Time is the debut album by Florida death metal band Atheist, recorded in 1988 and released locally on August 30, 1989, through Active Records, and internationally in 1990 through Metal Blade Records.

Piece of Time is the only Atheist album to feature bassist Roger Patterson, although he wrote many of the bass parts on the band's sophomore album Unquestionable Presence.

== Background and recording ==
The album was recorded at Morrisound Recording in Tampa, Florida and was produced by Scott Burns.

The album's release was delayed due to Atheist's original record label Mean Machine Records going bankrupt, which forced the band to find a new label. They eventually signed with UK label Active Records, who released the album in Europe soon after. The album was not released in the US for another six months, until Metal Blade Records arranged a licensing deal with Active Records and released it to the American market in November 1990.

== Music ==
Piece of Time has been described as sounding like "a death/thrash record made by players who had heard a Return to Forever record in their time." The album's tracks have been called "brain-twisting," and its style is characterized by "unpredictably shifting tempos, non-linear riffing progressions, and sheer technicality." Additionally, it has been described as "a death [metal] album as conceived from a jazz-rock aesthetic."

According to Langdon Hickman of Invisible Oranges, "the guitars, bass and drums [did not seem to] bob along in straight time like the cliche of metal bands, nor did they indulge in bluesy syncopation like some groups; instead, they had a microrhythmic thrust, a slight swing that seemed to recall samba, bossa nova, or perhaps jazz. This was tight and rich in the string instruments but perhaps most wild and loose-limbed in Steve Flynn’s drumming. He punched, stretched and pulled the beat; but not much, not yet. That would come later." According to Eduardo Rivadavia of AllMusic, the album "[meshes] frantic, severely discordant chords and sparse melodies with the agonized growls of frontman Kelly Shaefer." The album makes use of start-stop rhythms and turnarounds.

== Reception and legacy ==
Professional ratings
Review scores
Source	Rating
AllMusic	3/5 stars
Rock Hard	8/10
Terrorizer	9/10

In 2005, Piece of Time was ranked number 402 in Rock Hard magazine's book The 500 Greatest Rock & Metal Albums of All Time. It was described by James Hinchliffe in Terrorizer as the band's "least technically accomplished release and their most lyrically immature, [yet] it remains an exceptional work of late 80s deaththrash, crackling with an uncommon energy and creativity". Langdon Hickman of Invisible Oranges assessed, "Piece of Time is a good record, but it is also clearly a compilation of the best songs of their demo period, tunes that worked well live, and a few to fill out the remaining space, which is to say that it does not have the greatest structural integrity in the world. Still, debut records for many are an extension of demo years, acting as a sampler of things to come. For Atheist, this was certainly true. It was their second album that would display them at full strength."

Retrospectively, Mike DaRonco of Allmusic wrote that Piece of Time's sophisticated songwriting and dissonant riffs "stumped most casual listeners but wowed critics with the sheer audacity of the band's death-jazz."

The album has been cited as an influence by Dark Tranquility frontman Mikael Stanne. He said, "The mind-bending songs of Atheist were just so out of this world and even if I didn’t understand the songs back then they still resonated with me."

== Track listing ==
All lyrics are written by Kelly Shaefer.

No.	Title	Writer(s)	Length
1.	"Piece of Time"	Kelly Shaefer, Rand Burkey, Roger Patterson, Steve Flynn	4:30
2.	"Unholy War"	Shaefer, Patterson, Flynn	2:19
3.	"Room with a View"	Shaefer, Burkey, Patterson, Flynn	4:06
4.	"On They Slay"	Shaefer	3:39
5.	"Beyond"	Shaefer, Patterson, Flynn	3:00
6.	"I Deny"	Shaefer, Burkey, Patterson, Flynn	4:01
7.	"Why Bother?"	Shaefer, Patterson, Flynn	2:55
8.	"Life"	Shaefer, Flynn, Patterson	3:09
9.	"No Truth"	Shaefer, Burkey, Patterson, Flynn	4:30
Total length:			32:10

=== 2002 re-release ===
In 2002, EMG Entertainment re-released Piece of Time. Originally, EMG Entertainment was supposed to reissue all three Atheist albums, but Kelly Shaefer aborted those plans after only Piece of Time had been reissued. This release has been digitally remastered, and features six bonus tracks.

No.	Title	Length
1.	"Piece of Time"	4:30
2.	"Unholy War"	2:19
3.	"Room with a View"	4:06
4.	"On They Slay"	3:39
5.	"Beyond"	3:00
6.	"I Deny"	4:01
7.	"Why Bother?"	2:55
8.	"Life"	3:09
9.	"No Truth"	4:30
10.	"Undefiled Wisdom" (On They Slay demo)	4:30
11.	"Brain Damage" (On They Slay demo)	4:50
12.	"On They Slay" (On They Slay demo)	4:06
13.	"Hell Hath No Mercy" (Hell Hath No Mercy demo)	2:59
14.	"Choose Your Death" (Hell Hath No Mercy demo)	3:18
15.	"No Truth" (Hell Hath No Mercy demo)	4:11
Total length:		56:05

=== 2005 re-release ===
In 2005, Relapse Records re-released Piece of Time, this time along with the rest of Atheist's catalogue. This release was also digitally remastered, and features nine bonus tracks.

No.	Title	Length
1.	"Piece of Time"	4:30
2.	"Unholy War"	2:19
3.	"Room with a View"	4:06
4.	"On They Slay"	3:39
5.	"Beyond"	3:00
6.	"I Deny"	4:01
7.	"Why Bother?"	2:55
8.	"Life"	3:09
9.	"No Truth"	4:30
10.	"No Truth" (Beyond demo)	3:34
11.	"On They Slay" (Beyond demo)	3:34
12.	"Choose Your Death" (Beyond demo)	3:04
13.	"Brain Damage" (Beyond demo)	4:10
14.	"Beyond" (Beyond demo)	2:53
15.	"Hell Hath No Mercy" (Hell Hath No Mercy demo)	2:59
16.	"On They Slay" (On They Slay demo)	4:06
17.	"Brain Damage" (On They Slay demo)	4:50
18.	"Undefiled Wisdom" (On They Slay demo)	4:30
Total length:		67:44

== Personnel ==
=== Atheist ===
- Kelly Shaefer – vocals, rhythm guitar
- Rand Burkey – lead guitar
- Roger Patterson – bass
- Steve Flynn – drums

=== Production ===
- Scott Burns – production
- Atheist – production
- Borivoj Krgin – executive production
- Scott Burns – engineering
- Mike Fuller – mastering
- Ed Repka – cover art

Recorded at Morrisound Recording. Mastered at Fuller Sound.
