= Roger Patterson (bassist) =

American bass guitarist

Roger Patterson (November 29, 1968 – February 12, 1991) was an American bass player known for his work in the Florida technical death metal band Atheist. His playing style is characterized by its speed and complexity. Alex Webster, bassist with Cannibal Corpse, has acknowledged Patterson as "a big influence", describing his playing on the album Piece of Time as "phenomenal".

Patterson joined Atheist (then known as R.A.V.A.G.E.) in 1985. The band recorded their first full-length album, Piece of Time, in 1988, but due to record company issues, it was not released until two years later. As a result, Atheist began preparing for their next album, to which Roger contributed greatly. Before recording, however, the band was involved in a car crash and Roger was killed, on February 12, 1991. Patterson was buried in an Atheist shirt and a leather jacket, along with beer, cigarettes, marijuana and his bass guitar. Atheist frontman Kelly Shaefer recalled: "It was an odd sight to see all of these kids at the funeral in their Atheist shirts. The preacher was sweating bullets. I guarantee he had never seen a service like this before."

Atheist would record and release their next album, Unquestionable Presence, later that year and dedicate it to Roger's memory. The 2005 re-issue version features several previously unheard demo recordings of Patterson performing UP material.

In 1991, the grindcore band Napalm Death released Mass Appeal Madness in Roger's memory, as did Suffocation with their album Effigy of the Forgotten, and members of Death paid homage to him on their album Human (see liner notes).
