= Eric Greif =

American record producer (1962–2021)

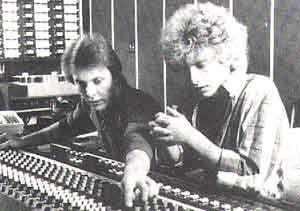
Eric Greif is at right, pictured with engineer Mike Frazier in 1985

Eric Greif (June 19, 1962 – October 29, 2021) was a Canadian-American lawyer, university instructor, and entertainment personality and producer known for a management and record production career within the heavy metal musical genre in the 1980s and early 1990s, and later within the legal profession. He was also known for being the longtime manager and lawyer of metal musician Chuck Schuldiner. Canadian filmmaker Sam Dunn has referred to Greif as a "hugely important figure in the extreme metal scene." He was the nephew of deceased American writer and publisher Martin Greif.

== Early life ==
Greif was the weekly teen columnist with Southam News daily Calgary Herald but, wanting to be "where all the record labels were", he left Calgary when he turned 18 and moved to Los Angeles. He attended the University of Sound Arts in Hollywood studying to become a recording engineer but soon switched to production when it was suggested to him by mentor Ron Fair.

== Entertainment career ==
Greif's first production work was with the Greg Leon Invasion, who he met after their show at The Troubadour and later managed. Greg Leon subsequently introduced Greif to Tommy Lee, whom Leon had played in a band with, and this led to Greif's management work with Mötley Crüe. Among his arrangements was Mötley Crüe's eventful 1982 tour of Canada.

By the mid-1980s, Greenworld Distribution, which had worked with Greif on the marketing and distribution of Mötley Crüe's first album Too Fast for Love, had signed contracts with the vast majority of bands Greif brought to them with production deals, including Kansas City's Vyper, who he produced and managed. John Hughes, writing for the Kansas City Star, noted that "Mr. Greif hopes that Vyper will follow the pattern of last year's heavy metal meteor, Mötley Crüe, for which he was assistant manager and which recorded its first album with Greenworld...Billboard magazine announced the news in this week's issue". Quoting Greif, Hughes wrote "I'm going for millionaire status rather than blue-collar status. I'm marketing a product. The '80s is image, a look. The '80s are MTV". Greenworld's 1986 bankruptcy caused problems for Greif as Enigma Records, Greenworld's largest creditor, refused to return any of the master tapes and was not interested in promoting anything that Greenworld had been working on.

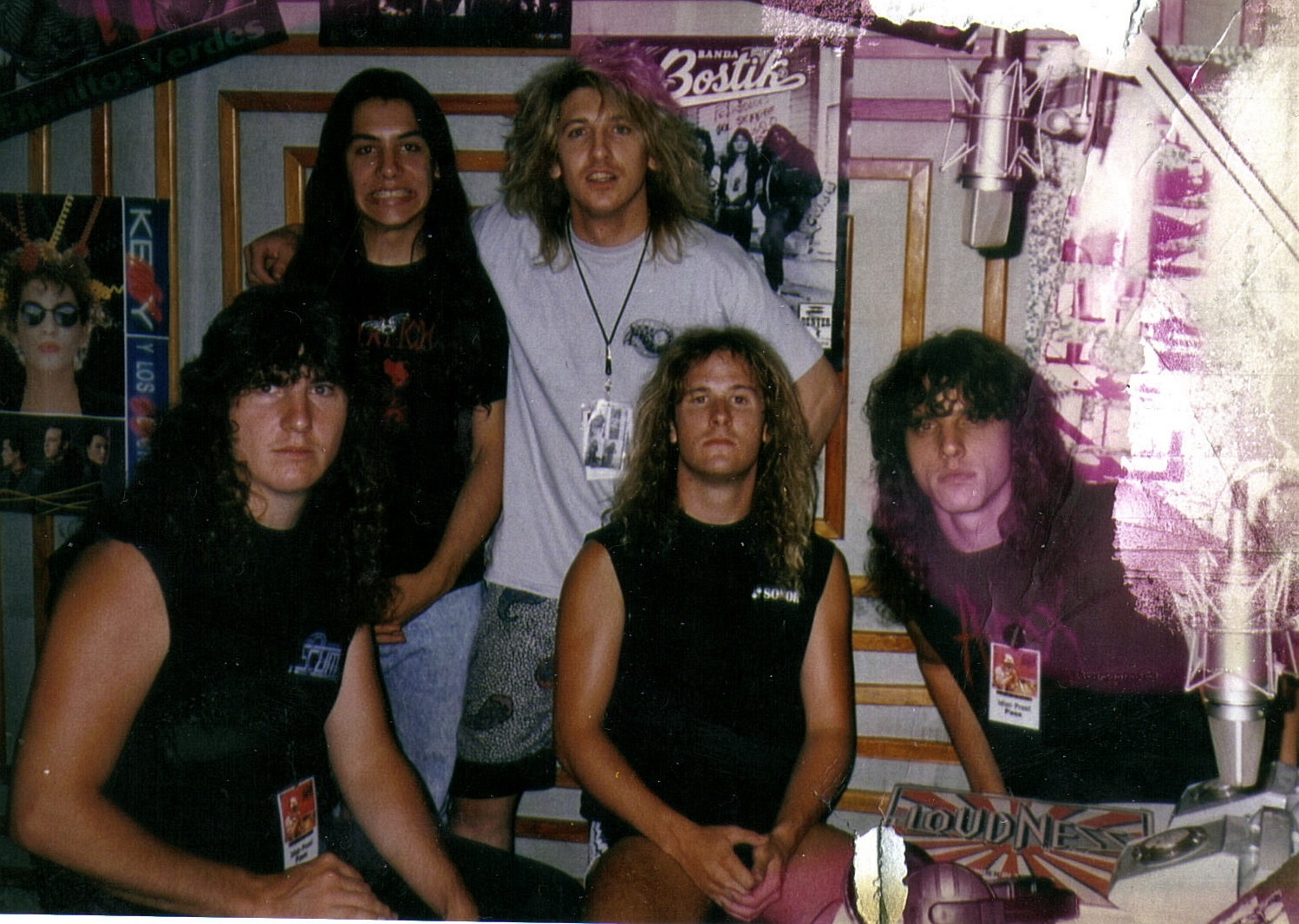
Eric Greif, middle, with the band Death in Mexico City, June 1989

Greif moved into concerts as co-promoter of Milwaukee Metalfest, described by MTV as "one of the largest celebrations of underground heavy metal in the country". He managed death metal pioneer Chuck Schuldiner and his Florida band Death, did some campaigning against US heavy metal media censorship, and produced bands such as Acrophet, Num Skull, Morbid Saint, Realm, Invocator, Viogression, Jackal, Twistin' Egyptians, Transmetal, Cyclone, Dr. Shrinker, and Morta Skuld. In September 1990, Greif held one of the first North American death metal festivals, Day of Death, in Milwaukee suburb Waukesha, Wisconsin, at the Expo Center and featured 26 bands including Autopsy, Hellwitch, Obliveon, Revenant, Viogression, Immolation, Atheist, Broken Hope, and Cynic.

Greif also managed LA band London, who at one time featured his former client Nikki Sixx, before their final break-up.

Greif also produced several music videos and documentaries.

In November 1991, Journal Sentinel music writer Terry Higgins stated: "At 29, Greif has become the kingpin of a steadily growing rock empire by becoming the kind of tough businessman who is as much at home in the courtroom as in the boardroom". Although client Schuldiner had said about Greif "we just came to the conclusion that it was stupid just fighting all the time, taking each other to court and all that stupid shit", by the mid-1990s Greif decided he had spent enough time in court to know he wanted to become a lawyer.

== Legal career ==
Greif was an alumnus of the University of Calgary Faculty of Law and was a member of the Canadian Bar Association. He completed his law degree from the University of Calgary while confined to a hospital bed due to complications from diabetes, a transplant, and infections.

Within his legal practice, Greif was a co-founder of the Association of Restorative Practitioners of the UK and Ireland, delivered victim-offender mediation training to the Czech Republic Probation and Mediation Service (PMS) in Prague, and was a State Prosecutor facilitator at a conference of the European Forum for Victim-Offender Mediation and Restorative Justice in Belgium.

In entertainment endeavors, Greif represented American guitarist/songwriter Paul Masvidal, Danish heavy metal guitarist Hank Shermann, and the bands Cynic, Obituary, Weapon, Anciients, and Massacre. He was the legal rep for the intellectual property of Chuck Schuldiner, and has submitted copyright claims to YouTube on behalf of Mutilation Music BMI for uploads of Death live footage. In latter 2012, Greif assisted metal documentarian and fellow Canadian Sam Dunn in logistics and raising funds for a short film on extreme metal, to be completed by late 2013. Dunn was quoted as saying "Eric Greif has been enormously supportive of our work. He is a hugely important figure in the extreme metal scene." Greif was instrumental in obtaining the rights to the majority of the Death catalog (with the exception of Symbolic) and reissuing them under Relapse Records.

== Personal life ==
Greif said that he has always opposed the abuse of hard drugs, especially after seeing it "destroy" a few lives, including a former business partner who died after years of addiction. Greif was a university lecturer and remained active in the music business simultaneously. He stopped teaching and practicing law only a few years before his death.

Greif was an insulin-dependent diabetic for much of his life, which was briefly cured by a pancreas transplant, but "it failed a few months later and health continues to be a struggle for him." He tried several times for a kidney transplant but was unsuccessful. His friends joked that he had nine lives because his health deteriorated severely, so many times, but he always climbed his way back to living his life in full. For example, in May 2021 he posted to social media: "Well, two weeks ago tonight a series of events landed me in the Nanaimo hospital. First I had an accident with my walker and broke both my legs at the tibia. Then an ambulance took me to the hospital, where for whatever reason I contracted a very vicious bug. It was so bad that I went into cardiac arrest, and was dead for 30 minutes. Lucky for me they never gave up and continued slamming my chest until eventually I regained consciousness and my heart started beating again...2 weeks later and my legs don't hurt even though they are in casts....It has been a hell of a couple of weeks. I've never died before, so the whole experience was new, but what I will say if life is always preferable to death."

The music industry made an announcement when he died.
