= Unquestionable Presence =

Studio album by Atheist
- Released: August 30, 1991
- Recorded: 1991
- Studios: Morrisound, Tampa, Florida
- Genres: Technical death metal; progressive metal; jazz fusion
- Length: 32:25
- Label: Active Records
- Producer: Scott Burns

Atheist chronology
Piece of Time (1989)	Unquestionable Presence (1991)	Elements (1993)

Unquestionable Presence is the second studio album by American death metal band Atheist. It was released in 1991 and added a new sound by using jazz-like harmonies, subtle Latin rhythms, and unusual time signatures.

== Background and recording ==
Bassist Roger Patterson wrote the bass lines for Unquestionable Presence, but died in a touring van accident before the recording sessions took place. His work, however, can be heard on the pre-production demos included with the 2005 re-release. The band initially approached Watchtower bassist Doug Keyser (whom Patterson had idolized) to substitute on bass duties for the album, but he declined this offer. Tony Choy was ultimately brought in as a replacement to play bass on the album. According to Atheist frontman Kelly Shaefer: "Tony Choy was really the only other capable person we knew [who] could physically play this stuff. Tony used all four fingers and his thumb, which was insane when it came to the fast parts. Most guys play half-notes, but Roger was all over the place and not many could pull it off." The band rented an apartment and rehearsed the album's material with Choy for eight weeks prior to recording. The album was recorded at Morrisound Recording and was produced by Scott Burns.

== Music and lyrics ==
The album makes use of slap bass and odd time signatures. According to Eduardo Rivadavia of AllMusic, Unquestionable Presence is characterized by "sparing but highly effective use of melody (mostly nuances and accents during solos and choruses)." Phil Freeman in The Wire (issue 261, p. 53) described Unquestionable Presence as a "more complex and progressive album, every song rocketing through multiple tricky time signatures and endless variations on already baffling riffs." Pestilence bassist Tony Choy was recruited to track bass guitar following the death of original bassist Roger Patterson.

Unquestionable Presence is considered a landmark album in the genre of technical death metal. Ultimate Guitar senior editor David Slavković states the album "dives deep into progressive metal waters", highlighting the album's stylistic diversity, and complex song structures and transitions. James Hinchcliffe described the album in Terrorizer as "the very pinnacle of scorching yet brain-twisting technical metal".

== Reception and legacy ==
Professional ratings
Review scores
Source	Rating
Allmusic	4.5/5 stars
Terrorizer	9.5/10

In October 2005, Unquestionable Presence was inducted into the Decibel Hall of Fame being the ninth album overall to be featured in the Decibel Hall of Fame. Staff writer Kevin Stewart-Panko wrote: "Okay, everyone under the age of 25, hearken back to when you first slapped on Calculating Infinity. Recall how completely overwhelmed you were by the Dillinger Escape Plan’s virtuosity, originality, technicality and songs seemingly designed to induce vertigo. Fourteen years ago, us geezers felt the same thing when Tampa, Florida’s Atheist released Unquestionable Presence. An exacting masterpiece consisting of mathematical song writing, heady lyrical concepts and a rhythm section bordering on the inhuman, Unquestionable Presence set a technical metal benchmark and remains one of the most underrated albums in extreme music history."

Eduardo Rivadavia of AllMusic gave the album four and a half stars out of five. He wrote: "A daunting album to decipher, Unquestionable Presence is just as rewarding once decoded, and is still considered by experts to be one of the Floridian death metal scene's ultimate statements in progressive metal."

In 2011, Justin M. Norton of Invisible Oranges wrote: "Unquestionable Presence is as fresh and vital as it was 20 years ago. Like all great albums, it defies trends and exists in its own space."

== Track listing ==
All lyrics by Kelly Shaefer. All music composed by Atheist.

No.	Title	Length
1.	"Mother Man"	4:34
2.	"Unquestionable Presence"	4:07
3.	"Your Life's Retribution"	3:17
4.	"Enthralled in Essence"	3:38
5.	"An Incarnation's Dream"	4:53
6.	"The Formative Years"	3:30
7.	"Brains"	3:41
8.	"And the Psychic Saw"	4:45
Total length:		32:25

=== 2005 re-release ===
In 2005, Relapse Records re-released Unquestionable Presence. This edition has been digitally remastered, and features nine bonus tracks.

No.	Title	Length
9.	"Enthralled in Essence" (Pre-production Demo 8/90)	3:32
10.	"The Formative Years" (Pre-production Demo 8/90)	3:29
11.	"Unquestionable Presence" (Pre-production Demo 8/90)	3:55
12.	"An Incarnation's Dream" (Pre-production Demo 8/90)	4:09
13.	"Retribution" (Pre-production Demo 8/90 (Instrumental)	3:19
14.	"Brains" (Pre-production Demo 8/90 (Instrumental)	3:40
15.	"Enthralled in Essence" (Demo 1990)	3:44
16.	"Mother Man" (Drums & Bass Tracks)	4:42
17.	"And the Psychic Saw" (Rhythm Tracks)	4:27
Total length:		68:32

== Personnel ==
- Kelly Shaefer – vocals, rhythm guitar
- Rand Burkey – lead guitar
- Tony Choy – bass
- Steve Flynn – drums
- Roger Patterson – bass (on tracks 9–15 on 2005 re-release)
- Scott Burns – production
- Atheist – production
- Justice Mitchell – cover artwork
