= Atheist (band) =

American death metal band

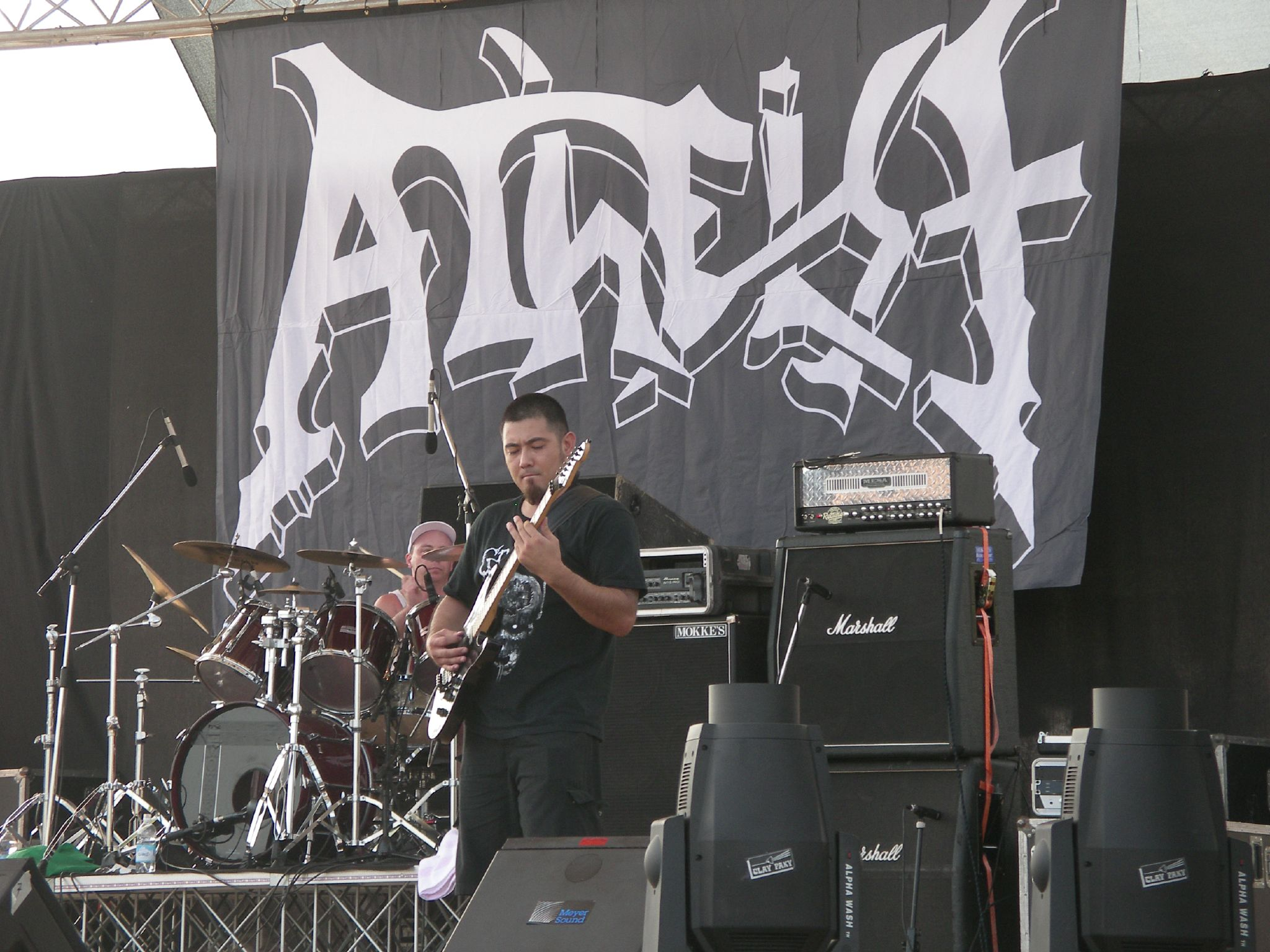
- Atheist at Evolution Festival 2006

Background information
- Also known as: Oblivion (1984–1985); R.A.V.A.G.E. (1985–1987)
- Origin: Sarasota, Florida, U.S.
- Genres: Technical death metal; progressive metal; thrash metal
- Years active: 1987–1992; 1993–1994; 2006–present
- Labels: Active; Death; Music For Nations; Metal Blade; Relapse; Agonia
- Members: Kelly Shaefer; Yoav Ruiz-Feingold; Alex Haddad; Jerry Witunsky; Dylan Marks

Atheist is an American death metal band from Sarasota, Florida, formed in 1987.

The band's original lineup consisted of vocalist and rhythm guitarist Kelly Shaefer, lead guitarist Rand Burkey, bassist Roger Patterson and drummer Steve Flynn. The band is known for its technical playing style. Its 1991 album Unquestionable Presence is regarded as a landmark of technical death metal. The band gained a following largely within its own genre. After disbanding in 1994, the group reformed in 2006 and has since released one studio album and a live DVD.

== History ==
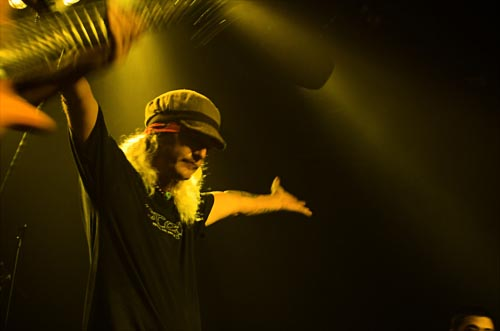
Atheist in 2006

=== Formation and Piece of Time (1984–1990) ===
Atheist was formed in 1984 in Sarasota, Florida as Oblivion and later R.A.V.A.G.E. (which stands for "Raging Atheists Vowing A Gory End").

Frontman Kelly Shaefer stated that on two occasions early in the band's career, the police were called on the band by the management of the clubs they were performing at, leading them to be "drag[ged] out" of the venues. Shaefer recalled the incidents: "There weren't that many clubs to play in so when we booked in regular rock and roll clubs that were used to booking bands like Mötley Crüe, we'd play and they were like, "what the fuck?!' [...] They actually put our stuff out in the alley, and we weren't allowed to be in the club. We didn't do anything other than play music that sounded crazy. They just didn't know how to take it. I remember the guy giving us the cutting of the neck sign like "Stop, stop." We thought it was great. It was a notch in our belt to be kicked out and have police carting our cabinets out the door."

They released their first album, Piece of Time, in 1989.

=== Death of Roger Patterson and Unquestionable Presence (1991) ===
Bassist Roger Patterson died on February 12, 1991, in a van accident at the age of 22, shortly before the band entered the studio to record their second album. The band was on tour with Candlemass. Although the band travelled by bus on this tour, they traveled home by van at the end of the tour to avoid paying an extra day of rental fees. The band's guitar tech, who was driving, attempted to pass a semi, "miscalculated his approach back into a lane, and went off the road," according to Shaefer. When the guitar tech attempted to pull the van back onto the highway, he lost control of the vehicle, resulting in Patterson's ejection from the vehicle. Patterson attempted to get himself back up off the ground, but was unable to, and went into shock. The crash occurred in rural Louisiana, and 48 minutes passed before emergency services began to arrive. Patterson died en route to the hospital, and Shaefer recalled that he was "coldly" informed of Patterson's death by a nurse while he was receiving stitches for his injuries in the accident. The band received an outpouring of support and condolences from fans in response to Patterson's death. Shaefer recalled Patterson's memorial service: "It was an odd sight to see all of these kids at the funeral in their Atheist shirts. The preacher was sweating bullets. I guarantee he had never seen a service like this before."

Shortly after, they recruited ex-Pestilence and Cynic bassist Tony Choy to record their second album, Unquestionable Presence, released in 1991.

=== Elements and disbandment (1992–2007) ===
Atheist disbanded for the first time in 1992, then reunited in 1993 to record a third album, Elements, fulfilling their contractual requirements, before disbanding for a second time in early 1994.

Relapse Records reissued the band's three albums in late 2005, as well as a vinyl box set containing the three albums plus the R.A.V.A.G.E. demo "On They Slay". In January 2006, Atheist announced they were regrouping to perform live during the summer and autumn, including an appearance at Wacken Open Air in August 2006. The line-up was Shaefer, Burkey, Choy and Flynn. Shaefer only provided vocals due to long battles with tendinitis and carpal tunnel syndrome. The Gnostic guitarist Sonny Carson played all of Shaefer's guitar parts, while Burkey was later replaced with Chris Baker of Gnostic.

=== Reformation and Jupiter (2008–present) ===
On July 12, 2008, Shaefer issued a statement indicating that he and Flynn were working on new material. A month later, Shaefer announced that they had started recording a new studio album, their first in over 15 years. The band toured Europe and the US in 2009 to celebrate the 20th anniversary of the release of Piece of Time. A live DVD filmed at the Wacken Open Air Festival appeared towards the end of the year.

On July 11, 2010, Atheist revealed that their fourth studio album would be called Jupiter and was set for a November release. They signed a deal with Season of Mist and Jupiter was released on November 8, 2010.

On August 3, 2010, Shaefer and Flynn announced on behalf of the band that Tony Choy would not appear on Jupiter but was likely to appear in live performances with the band due to his own musical aspirations. The band announced in 2014 that it was working on a fifth studio album, planned to be released in 2015. In February 2018, Atheist signed with Agonia Records, while they continued to tour.

The band was supposed to tour Europe with Greek thrash band Suicidal Angels and American death metal band Abysmal Dawn in 2022, but this tour was postponed.

The band signed with Nuclear Blast Records in 2023. The label reissued the band's back catalog. The band toured South America with Cryptopsy in 2025 and stated that they had planned to write and record a new album. Shaefer stated that six songs had been written for the album. The band toured the US, Japan, New Zealand and Mexico during this time. As of 2026, a follow-up to 2010's Jupiter has yet to be released.

== Musical style and influences ==
Atheist is considered one of the pioneers of technical death metal. Mike DaRonco of Allmusic said Atheist are "arguably the ultimate progressive metal band of their day". Atheist have also been noted for elements of thrash metal, jazz and progressive rock present in their music. According to Langdon Hickman of Invisible Oranges, "Like almost every metal band of the 1980s, Atheist also did not go untouched by progressive metal. Progressive rock mostly filtered into heavy metal through those 1970s hard rock and heavy metal bands that laid [the] foundational roots for the metal of the 1980s." Vocalist Kelly Shaefer said: "One of the main reasons Atheist ended up being such a strange band was we were trying so hard not to sound like anybody else that we went way overboard. We were outsiders within an outsider's scene (referring to Florida death metal) so we made it doubly hard for ourselves."

Early in the band's career, the members cited Rush, Kiss, Exodus, Kreator, Dark Angel, Metallica, Accept and Destruction as influences.

== Band members ==
=== Current ===
- Kelly Shaefer – lead vocals (1987–1994, 2006–present), rhythm guitar (1987–1994)
- Yoav Ruiz-Feingold – bass, backing vocals (2019–present)
- Jerry Witunsky – lead guitar (2023–present)
- Alex Haddad – rhythm guitar (2023–present)
- Dylan Marks – drums (2023–present)

=== Former ===
Guitarists

- Rand Burkey – (1987–1994)
- Frank Emmi – (1993–1994)
- Sonny Carson – (2006–2009)
- Chris Baker – (2006–2012)
- Jonathan Thompson – (2010–2012), bass (2010)
- Jason Holloway – (2012–2018)
- Chris Martin – (2012–2022)
- Daniel Martinez – (2019–2022)

Bassists

- Roger Patterson – (1987–1991; died 1991)
- Tony Choy – (1991–1994, 2006–2009, 2012–2018)
- Darren McFarland – live (1992)
- Travis Morgan – (2011–2012)
- Sean Martinez – live (2019)

Drummers

- Steve Flynn – drums (1987–1992, 2006–2023)
- Marcel DeSantos – live (1991–1992)
- Mickey Hayes – live (1992)
- Josh Greenbaum – (1993–1994)
- Joey Muha – live (2019)
- Anthony "Apollo XVII" Medaglia – live (2019–2022)

Timeline

== Discography ==
=== Studio albums ===
- Piece of Time (1989)
- Unquestionable Presence (1991)
- Elements (1993)
- Jupiter (2010)

=== Live albums ===
- Unquestionable Presence: Live at Wacken (2009)

=== Other releases ===
- Hell Hath No Mercy (demo, 1987)
- Beyond (demo, 1988)
- Atheist: The Collection (boxed set, 2005)
- Best of Atheist (compilation, 2017)
- Original Album Collection (boxed set, 2018)

== See also ==
- Florida death metal
- Technical death metal
- Morrisound Recording
