= Active Records =

- Parent company: RCA Records
- Founded: 1980
- Defunct: 1994
- Genre: Heavy metal music

Active Records was a record sublabel of RCA Records founded in 1980. The label focused mainly on heavy metal music. The label was dissolved in 1994.

== Bands ==
- Anacrusis
- Atheist
- Budgie
- Candlemass
- Hexenhaus
- Merciless
- Destiny
- Therion

== See also ==
- List of record labels
