= Technical death metal =

Subgenre of death metal

- Other names: Tech-death
- Stylistic origins: Death metal; progressive metal; avant-garde metal; jazz fusion
- Cultural origins: Late 1980s, United States, Canada and Europe

Other topics
- List of bands; brutal death metal; mathcore; melodic death metal; djent; progressive metalcore

Technical death metal (also known as tech death) is a musical subgenre of death metal with particular focus on instrumental skill and complex songwriting. Technical and progressive experimentation in death metal began in the late 1980s and early 1990s, largely driven by four bands that, according to Allmusic, are "technical death metal's Big Four" – Death, Pestilence, Atheist, and Cynic. All but Pestilence are part of the Florida death metal scene, to which Nocturnus, another influential band, also belongs.

== Characteristics ==
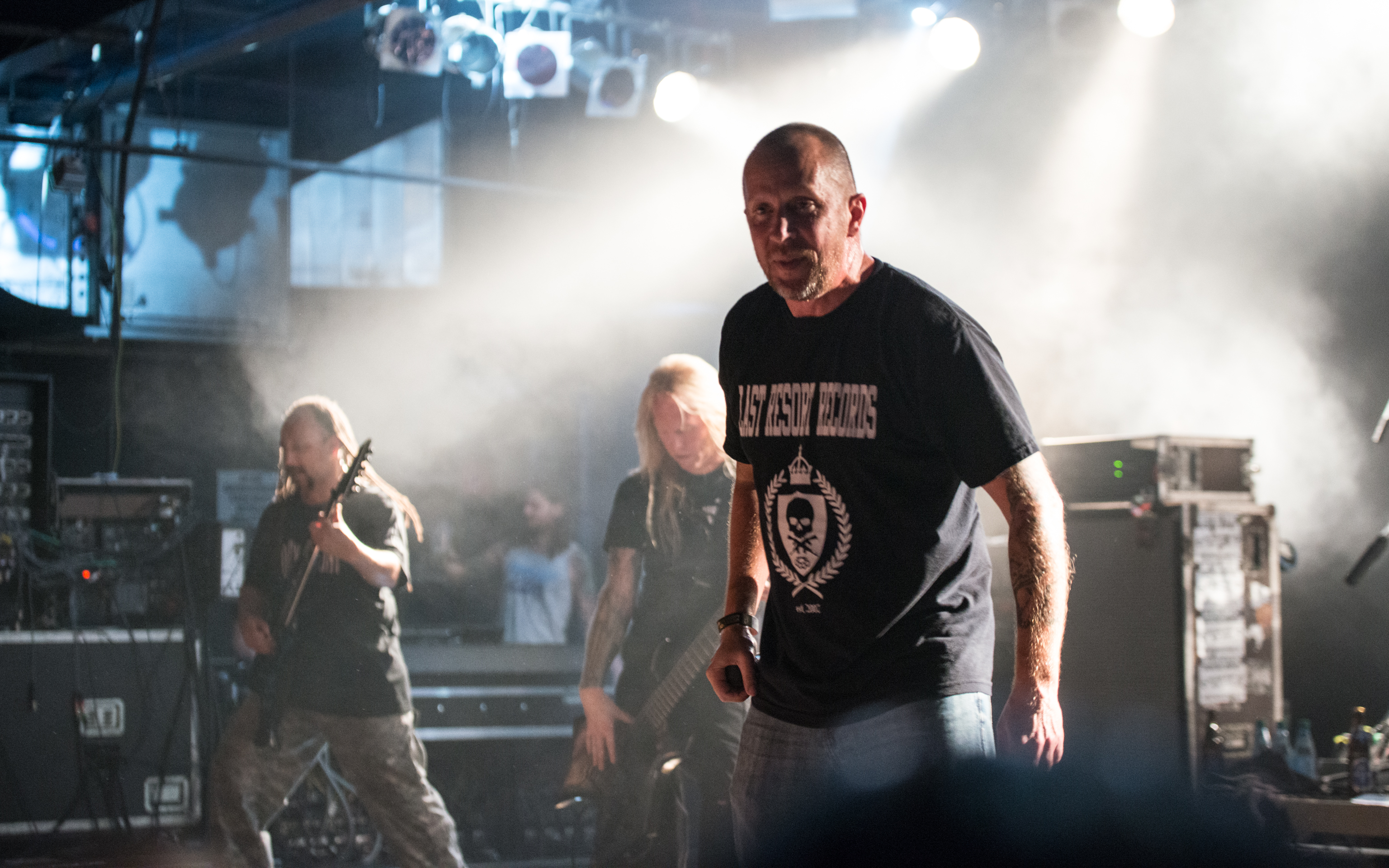
New York's Suffocation are commonly viewed as one of the earliest practitioners of technical death metal.

Technical death metal has been described as "a real madhouse" by Ultimate Guitar. Distinct features of the subgenre include dynamic song structures, complex and atypical rhythmic structures, abundant use of diminished chords and arpeggios, frequent employment of odd time chord progressions, and consistent use of techniques such as string skipping in the guitar work. Bass lines are usually complex, and drumming is complex including techniques such as blast beats, odd time signatures and double kicks. The technical death metal genre has also been influenced by mostly jazz fusion, as well as thrash metal and progressive/technical-inspired heavy metal bands like Death, Megadeth, Slayer, Voivod, Kreator, Dark Angel, Coroner, Sadus, and Watchtower, the latter of whose second album Control and Resistance (1989) is often considered to be one of the sources of inspiration for the genre.

Despite the increasingly sophisticated songwriting, technical death metal has been noted for having more commercial appeal than traditional death metal. According to music journalist T Coles, "Though death metal songwriters weren't moving away from the grim subject material, there was a growing desire for clarity, with bands tightening up to better communicate weird or abstract ideas of death, and to court some of the more lucrative commercial possibilities. This more professional approach, forged from recording engineers and musicians working to refine the sound, would be the spark that finally ignited the interest of larger organizations."

Sociologist and music critic Keith Kahn-Harris stated the belief that death metal bands began performing what he called "more technical or listenable" music because playing traditional death metal eventually became "less artistically satisfying" for some musicians. He wrote: "Within the confines of a genre there's always a tension: Where do you go with extreme music? What limits are left to explore?"

== History ==
The 1990 album The Key by Nocturnus has been cited as the first progressive death metal album. One of the key works that cemented the subgenre was Atheist's debut album Piece of Time, also released in 1990, which took death metal into a more intricate level while incorporating influences ranging from jazz fusion to progressive metal. In 1991, New York death metal group Suffocation released their debut album Effigy of the Forgotten, which focused on pairing speed and brutality with a "sophisticated" sense of songwriting. Atheist's second album Unquestionable Presence, Pestilence's third album Testimony of the Ancients, and Death's fourth album Human were all released the same year, forging a path for more intricate and refined releases within the death metal genre.

In the mid–1990s, many bands began to push crosspolinated technical death metal and brutal death metal, with Cryptopsy, Nile, Origin and Dying Fetus being forefront bands.

== See also ==
- List of technical death metal bands
- Florida death metal
- Morrisound Recording
