= Deicide discography =

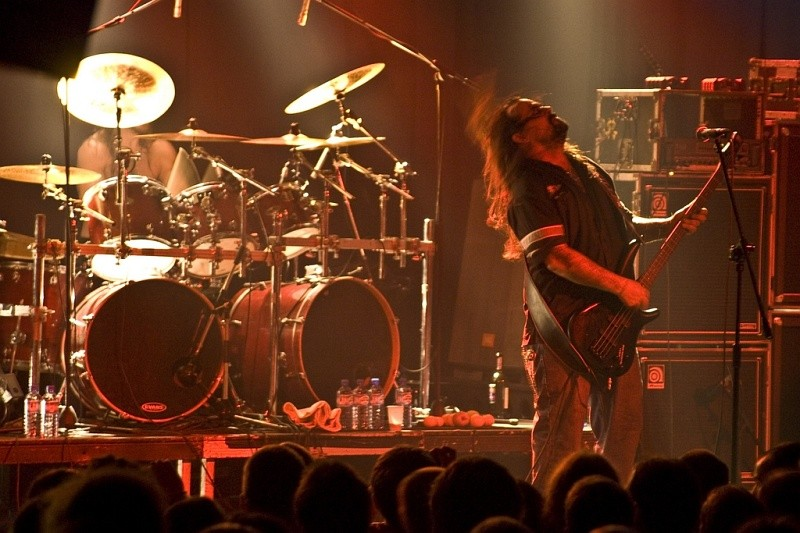
- Deicide in 2009
- Studio albums: 13
- Live albums: 1
- Compilation albums: 2
- Video albums: 2
- Music videos: 8

This is the discography of the American death metal band Deicide.

== Albums ==
=== Studio albums ===
Title	Details	Chart positions								Sales
Title	Details	US Heat	US Ind	AUS	FRA	SWE	GER	UK	JPN	Sales
Deicide	Released: June 26, 1990; Label: Roadrunner; Formats: CD, CS, LP, DL	—	—	—	—	—	—	—	—	US: 96,000+
Legion	Released: June 9, 1992; Label: Roadrunner; Formats: CD, CS, LP, DL	16	—	—	—	—	—	—	—	US: 103,000+
Once upon the Cross	Released: April 18, 1995; Label: Roadrunner; Formats: CD, CS, LP, DL	22	—	128	—	—	—	66	—	US: 86,000+
Serpents of the Light	Released: October 21, 1997; Label: Roadrunner; Formats: CD, CS, LP, DL	17	—	177	—	—	—	—	—	US: 53,000+
Insineratehymn	Released: June 27, 2000; Label: Roadrunner; Formats: CD, CS, LP, DL	—	—	—	—	—	—	—	—	US: 30,000+
In Torment in Hell	Released: September 25, 2001; Label: Roadrunner; Formats: CD, LP, DL	—	—	—	—	—	—	—	—	US: 16,000+
Scars of the Crucifix	Released: February 24, 2004; Label: Earache; Formats: CD, CD+DVD, LP, DL	24	18	158	140	—	—	179	—	US: 4,000+
The Stench of Redemption	Released: August 22, 2006; Label: Earache; Formats: CD, LP, DL	11	21	—	99	—	84	170	213	US: 4,000+
Till Death Do Us Part	Released: May 13, 2008; Label: Earache; Formats: CD, LP, DL	11	—	—	168	56	—	—	—	US: 2,900+
To Hell with God	Released: February 15, 2011; Label: Century Media; Formats: CD, LP, DL	10	45	—	200	—	—	—	—	US: 5,800+
In the Minds of Evil	Released: November 26, 2013; Label: Century Media; Formats: CD, LP, DL	4	47	—	—	—	—	—	—	US: 7,200+
Overtures of Blasphemy	Released: September 14, 2018; Label: Century Media	3	—	—	—	—	22	—	—	
Banished by Sin	Released: April 26, 2024; Label: Reigning Phoenix Music	—	—	—	—	—	42	—	—	

=== Live albums ===
Title	Album details	Sales
When Satan Lives	Released: October 20, 1998; Label: Roadrunner; Format: CD, CS, DL	US: 30,000+

=== Compilation albums ===
Title	Album details	Sales
Amon: Feasting the Beast	Released: 1993; Label: Roadrunner; Format: CD, CS, LP, DL	US: 50,000+
The Best of Deicide	Released: September 23, 2003; Label: Roadrunner; Format: CD, DL	US: 5,000+

=== Video albums ===
Title	Video details
When London Burns	Released: March 7, 2006; Label: Earache; Format: DVD, DL
Doomsday L.A.	Released: January 22, 2007; Label: Earache; Format: DVD, DL

== Music videos ==
Year	Title	Director
1990	"Sacrificial Suicide"	-
1995	"Once upon the Cross"	-
2004	"Scars of the Crucifix"	Peter Bridgewater
2006	"Homage for Satan"	Alfred Tomaszewski, Matthew Stawski
2006	"Desecration"	Alfred Tomaszewski
2012	"Conviction"	David Brodsky, Tim Kellen
2013	"End the Wrath of God"	-
2018	"Defying the Sacred"	Scott Hansen
2023	"Bury The Cross... With Your Christ"	David Brodsky
2024	"Sever The Tongue"	David Brodsky
2024	"From Unknown Heights You Shall Fall"	David Brodsky
