= The Best of Deicide =

Greatest hits album by Deicide
- Released: September 23, 2003
- Genre: Death metal
- Length: 64:24
- Label: Roadrunner

Deicide chronology
In Torment in Hell (2001)	The Best of Deicide (2003)	Scars of the Crucifix (2004)

Professional ratings
Review scores
Source	Rating
AllMusic	4.5/5 stars

The Best of Deicide is a compilation album by Florida death metal band Deicide. It is a collection of 20 songs from Deicide's catalogue with Roadrunner Records, the label with whom the band had recently ended its career-long record deal. However, no songs from In Torment in Hell are included.

== Track listing ==
No.	Title	Album	Length
1.	"Dead by Dawn"	Deicide	3:55
2.	"Carnage in the Temple of the Damned"	Deicide	3:32
3.	"Lunatic of God's Creation"	Deicide	2:40
4.	"Sacrificial Suicide"	Deicide	2:52
5.	"Crucifixation"	Deicide	3:49
6.	"Satan Spawn, the Caco-Daemon"	Legion	4:26
7.	"Trifixion"	Legion	2:59
8.	"In Hell I Burn"	Legion	4:37
9.	"Dead but Dreaming"	Legion	3:13
10.	"Once upon the Cross"	Once upon the Cross	3:34
11.	"They Are the Children of the Underworld"	Once upon the Cross	3:09
12.	"When Satan Rules His World"	Once upon the Cross	2:53
13.	"Trick or Betrayed"	Once upon the Cross	2:25
14.	"Behind the Light Thou Shall Rise"	Once upon the Cross	2:59
15.	"Serpents of the Light"	Serpents of the Light	3:03
16.	"Bastard of Christ"	Serpents of the Light	2:48
17.	"Blame It on God"	Serpents of the Light	2:43
18.	"This Is Hell We're In"	Serpents of the Light	2:49
19.	"Bible Basher"	Insineratehymn	2:23
20.	"Standing in the Flames"	Insineratehymn	3:33
Total length:			64:24

== Personnel ==
- Glen Benton – bass, vocals
- Eric Hoffman – guitars
- Brian Hoffman – guitars
- Steve Asheim – drums
