= When Satan Lives =

Live album by Deicide
- Released: October 20, 1998
- Recorded: 1998
- Venue: House of Blues, Chicago
- Genre: Death metal
- Length: 55:22
- Label: Roadrunner
- Producer: Deicide

Deicide chronology
Serpents of the Light (1997)	When Satan Lives (1998)	Insineratehymn (2000)

Professional ratings
Review scores
Source	Rating
AllMusic	3/5 stars
Classic Rock	3/5 stars
Kerrang!	4/5 stars

When Satan Lives is a live album by American death metal band Deicide. It was recorded at the House of Blues in Chicago, Illinois in 1998.

== Track listing ==
No.	Title	Album	Length
1.	"When Satan Rules His World"	Once upon the Cross	3:14
2.	"Blame It on God"	Serpents of the Light	2:59
3.	"Bastard of Christ"	Serpents of the Light	2:58
4.	"They Are the Children of the Underworld"	Once upon the Cross	3:09
5.	"Serpents of the Light"	Serpents of the Light	3:08
6.	"Dead but Dreaming"	Legion	3:27
7.	"Slave to the Cross"	Serpents of the Light	3:28
8.	"Lunatic of God's Creation"	Deicide	2:52
9.	"Oblivious to Evil"	Deicide	2:50
10.	"Once upon the Cross"	Once upon the Cross	3:05
11.	"Believe the Lie"	Serpents of the Light	2:54
12.	"Trick or Betrayed"	Once upon the Cross	2:24
13.	"Behind the Light Thou Shall Rise"	Once upon the Cross	3:03
14.	"Deicide"	Deicide	4:16
15.	"Father Baker's"	Serpents of the Light	3:37
16.	"Dead by Dawn"	Deicide	4:09
17.	"Sacrificial Suicide"	Deicide	3:49
Total length:			55:22

== Personnel ==
- Glen Benton – bass, vocals
- Eric Hoffman – guitars
- Brian Hoffman – guitars
- Steve Asheim – drums

Production

- Deicide – production
- Steve Remote – recording, engineering
- Jim Morris – mixing
