= Doomsday L.A. (video) =

Video by Deicide
- Released: January 22, 2007
- Recorded: November 10, 2006 (live at the Knitting Factory in Los Angeles, California)
- Genre: Death metal
- Length: 72:22
- Language: English
- Label: Earache

Deicide chronology
The Stench of Redemption (2006)	Doomsday L.A. (2007)	Till Death Do Us Part (2008)

Doomsday L.A. is the second live DVD released by Deicide. It was released shortly after the Doomsday L.A. live EP was released on iTunes. The bonus material on the DVD includes interviews with the band members and the videos for "Homage For Satan" and "Desecration".

It was rated eight out of ten by Blabbermouth.

== Track listing ==
1. "Intro"
2. "Dead by Dawn"
3. "Once Upon the Cross"
4. "Scars of the Crucifix"
5. "The Stench of Redemption"
6. "Death to Jesus"
7. "When Satan Rules His World"
8. "Serpents of the Light"
9. "Dead but Dreaming"
10. "They Are the Children of the Underworld"
11. "Bastard of Christ"
12. "Desecration"
13. "Behind the Light Thou Shall Rise"
14. "When Heaven Burns"
15. "Walk with the Devil in Dreams You Behold"
16. "Homage for Satan"
17. "Lunatic of God's Creation"
18. "Kill the Christian"
19. "Sacrificial Suicide"

== Personnel ==
- Glen Benton – bass, vocals
- Ralph Santolla – guitars
- Jack Owen – guitars
- Steve Asheim – drums
