= Doomsday L.A. =

Doomsday L.A. may refer to:

- Doomsday L.A. (video), a live DVD by Deicide recorded 2006 and released 2007
- Doomsday L.A. (EP), a live EP by Deicide recorded 2006 and released 2007
