= In the Minds of Evil =

Studio album by Deicide
- Released: November 25, 2013
- Recorded: February, July - August 2013
- Studio: Audiohammer Studios in Sanford, Florida
- Genre: Death metal
- Length: 36:54
- Label: Century Media
- Producer: Jason Suecof

Deicide chronology
To Hell with God (2011)	In the Minds of Evil (2013)	Overtures of Blasphemy (2018)

Professional ratings
Review scores
Source	Rating
Loudwire	3.5/5 stars

In the Minds of Evil is the eleventh studio album by American death metal band Deicide. It was released on November 25, 2013, by Century Media Records. It was the first album to feature guitarist Kevin Quirion and the last to feature guitarist Jack Owen. The album has been described as moving away from the melodic inclinations of the previous few albums and towards an "old school" death metal sound reminiscent of Legion.

== Background ==
Glen Benton explained the band's thought process going into the album: "You know what man, I’m 46 years old, I never thought in a million fucking years I’d be doing this crap for as long as I have and I just don’t give a fuck anymore. It’s kind of like when I go to the casino and gamble. If you go to the casino and you’re worried about losing, you’ll never fucking win. If you go to the casino and don’t give a fuck what you spend and you’re just there to have a good time and you can walk away from it a winner or a loser, you’ve won. So, I don’t give a fuck anymore. If you like what we do, great. If you don’t, I’ve had my balls stepped on for I don’t know how many fucking years and just because Neil-Young-Booger-Sugar doesn’t like it or some 13-year-old kid wants to tear it apart on the internet, who gives a fuck?"

== Style ==
Drummer Steve Asheim observed that the album was "a departure from our recent stuff and has more of an old school vibe. Not quite as melodic and very catchy riffs". Asheim elaborated further, explaining that the band wanted Glen Benton's vocals "to sound more old-school. So, it's a bit of the new with a little throwback action". Benton concurred, observing that Deicide has "settled into a permanent lineup and the writing process now is like the writing process was back in the beginning and we’re all showing up and writing the songs together. Everybody has an input and it shows". Benton cited the addition of guitarist Kevin Quirion as critical to In the Minds of Evil.

== Recording ==
Drummer Steve Asheim noted that producer Jason Suecof "wanted to capture the Legion feel" on In the Minds of Evil. During the tracking of the album, Asheim revealed that he was performing with "a blown out shoulder. It hurt like hell. It kept dislocating, it was popping and cracking. I just dealt with the pain and got the job done though". Asheim further noted that his approach to drumming on the album was "mostly improvised". He explained in another interview that the composition of the album reflected both preparation and improvisation. "Some vocals and guitar and bass stuff [were improvised]. The song writing – the parts and structures – were all done pre-pro[duction], before we got there. But once we were in and mic'd up, there was a lot of on-the-spot stuff happening. Most of my drum fills were improv[ised]. And I know the fellas just let loose with some on-the-fly kind of stuff together, and you can really hear that. I think the spontaneity and the energy, it really rings through".

== Track listing ==
All lyrics are written by Glen Benton.

No.	Title	Music	Length
1.	"In the Minds of Evil"	Kevin Quirion	3:52
2.	"Thou Begone"	Quirion, Jack Owen	3:43
3.	"Godkill"	Quirion, Owen	3:11
4.	"Beyond Salvation"	Owen	2:58
5.	"Misery of One"	Quirion	3:21
6.	"Between the Flesh and the Void"	Owen, Quirion, Benton	3:54
7.	"Even the Gods Can Bleed"	Quirion, Steve Asheim	2:58
8.	"Trample the Cross"	Asheim	3:00
9.	"Fallen to Silence"	Owen, Benton	3:09
10.	"Kill the Light of Christ"	Asheim	3:30
11.	"End the Wrath of God"	Quirion	3:13
Total length:			36:54

The song "In the Minds of Evil" contains a sample from The Dark Knight.

== Personnel ==
=== Deicide ===
- Glen Benton – bass, vocals
- Steve Asheim – drums
- Jack Owen – guitars
- Kevin Quirion – guitars

=== Additional personnel ===
- Jason Suecof – production, engineering, mixing
- Ronn Miller – assistant engineering
- Eyal Levi – assistant mixing
- Alan Douches – mastering
- Simon Cowell – artwork
- Tim Hubbard – photography
