= To Hell with God =

Studio album by Deicide
- Released: February 21, 2011
- Recorded: 2009–2010
- Studio: Audiohammer Studios, Sanford, Florida
- Genre: Death metal
- Length: 35:42
- Label: Century Media
- Producer: Mark Lewis

Deicide chronology
Till Death Do Us Part (2008)	To Hell with God (2011)	In the Minds of Evil (2013)

Professional ratings
Review scores
Source	Rating
About.com	3.5/5 stars
AllMusic	2.5/5 stars
Chronicles of Chaos	7.5/10

To Hell with God is the tenth studio album by American death metal band Deicide. The follow-up to Till Death Do Us Part (2008), it was originally intended to be released in 2009 before being pushed back to a 2010 release, and was finally released on February 21, 2011, through Century Media Records. It is the last Deicide album to feature guitarist Ralph Santolla, and the first not to be produced by drummer Steve Asheim since Scars of the Crucifix (2004); instead To Hell with God was produced by Mark Lewis. A claymation video for "Conviction" was released through Century Media's YouTube channel on February 27, 2012.

== Track listing ==
All tracks are written by Glen Benton and Steve Asheim, except where noted.

No.	Title	Writer(s)	Length
1.	"To Hell with God"		4:21
2.	"Save Your"	Asheim, Benton, Jack Owen	3:32
3.	"Witness of Death"		3:05
4.	"Conviction"	Benton, Owen	3:15
5.	"Empowered by Blasphemy"		3:16
6.	"Angels of Hell"	Asheim, Benton, Owen	3:12
7.	"Hang in Agony Until You're Dead"		3:59
8.	"Servant of the Enemy"		3:17
9.	"Into the Darkness You Go"	Benton, Owen	3:32
10.	"How Can You Call Yourself a God"		4:15
Total length:			35:42

== Personnel ==
- Glen Benton – bass, vocals
- Steve Asheim – drums
- Ralph Santolla – guitars
- Jack Owen – guitars
- "Grim Twins" art studio – design

== Charts ==
Chart (2011)	Peak position
Belgian Heatseekers Albums (Ultratop Flanders)	18
Belgian Heatseekers Albums (Ultratop Wallonia)	3
French Albums (SNEP)	200
UK Rock & Metal Albums (OCC)	32
US Independent Albums (Billboard)	45
US Hard Rock Albums (Billboard)	23
US Heatseekers Albums (Billboard)	10
