= Council of the Fallen =

American band

- Origin: Tampa, Florida, United States
- Genres: Death metal, Black metal, Melodic death metal
- Years active: 1997-2007
- Label: Season of Mist
- Spinoffs: Order of Ennead
- Members: Kevin Quirion; Steve Asheim; Scott Patrick; Santiago Dobles

Council of the Fallen was an American death metal band formed in Tampa, Florida. Council of the Fallen have released two LPs and one EP album.

== History ==
Council of the Fallen was formed in Tampa, Florida in 1997 under the name "Vehement". Steve Asheim of Deicide joined the band in November 2007, prior to bands' break-up.

Council of the Fallen split-up in 2007. Three members of the band Kevin Quirion, Scott Patrick and Steve Asheim, regrouped as Order of Ennead.

== Members ==
Last lineup

- Steve Asheim – drums, percussion
- Kevin Quirion – vocals, rhythm guitar
- Scott Patrick – bass
- Santiago Dobles – lead guitar

Previous members

- Derek Roddy – lead guitar
- Sean Baxter – vocals, bass, guitar, violin
- David Kinkade – drums

== Discography ==
=== Studio albums ===
- Revealing Damnation (2002)
- Deciphering the Soul (2004)
- Sever All Negatives (EP) (2006)
