= When London Burns =

Video by Deicide
- Released: March 7, 2006
- Recorded: November 29, 2004, live at The Mean Fiddler, London, England.
- Genre: Death metal
- Length: 89:16
- Label: Earache

Deicide chronology
Scars of the Crucifix (2004)	When London Burns (2006)	The Stench of Redemption (2006)

When London Burns is the first DVD released by Florida death metal band Deicide. It was released on March 7, 2006, by Earache Records. The extra features include a documentary entitled Behind the Scars, which discusses the production of the album Scars of the Crucifix. The Hoffman brothers left Deicide five days before the concert was recorded.

== Track listing ==
Recorded live at The Mean Fiddler, London, England on November 29, 2004.

1. "Scars of the Crucifix" – 3:23
2. "They Are the Children of the Underworld" – 3:10
3. "Bastard of Christ" – 3:02
4. "When Satan Rules His World" – 3:08
5. "Once Upon the Cross" – 3:14
6. "Kill the Christian" – 3:18
7. "Serpents of the Light" – 3:05
8. "Dead but Dreaming" – 3:21
9. "Lunatic of God's Creation" – 2:49
10. "Sacrificial Suicide" – 3:17
11. "When Heaven Burns" – 3:54
12. "Dead by Dawn" – 4:21
13. "Behind the Light Thou Shall Rise" – 3:02
14. "Deicide" – 4:18
15. "Crucifixation" – 5:26
16. "Christ Denied" – 3:25
17. "Oblivious to Evil" – 3:03
18. "Behind the Scars" documentary – 30:00

"Behind the Scars" includes a look behind the scenes as Deicide record Scars of the Crucifix, candid interviews at home with the band and backstage, exclusive footage from the rehearsal room, and the formation of Deicide and Glen Benton's forehead branding explained.

== Personnel ==
- Glen Benton – bass, lead vocals
- Steve Asheim – drums
- Jack Owen – guitars
- Dave Suzuki – guitars, backing vocals
