= Amon: Feasting the Beast =

Compilation album by Deicide
- Released: 1993
- Recorded: August 1987 – December 1989
- Genre: Death metal
- Length: 29:47
- Label: Roadrunner
- Producer: Deicide

Deicide chronology
Legion (1992)	Amon: Feasting the Beast (1993)	Once upon the Cross (1995)

Amon: Feasting the Beast is a compilation album by Florida death metal band Deicide. It was released in 1993 by Roadrunner Records. It is a compilation of the two demos the band released when they were called Amon.

== Track listing ==
All lyrics written by Glen Benton, all music written by Deicide.

1. "Lunatic of God's Creation" – 2:51
2. "Sacrificial Suicide" – 2:56
3. "Crucifixation" – 3:49
4. "Carnage in the Temple of the Damned" – 3:07
5. "Dead by Dawn" – 4:00
6. "Blaspherereion" – 4:16
7. "Feasting the Beast (Intro)" – 0:51
8. "Sacrificial Suicide" – 2:57
9. "Day of Darkness" – 2:12
10. "Oblivious to Nothing" – 2:48

== Personnel ==
- Glen Benton – bass; vocals
- Eric Hoffman – guitars
- Brian Hoffman – guitars
- Steve Asheim – drums
- Deicide – production
- Scott Burns – mixing
- Chris Gehringer – mastering
