= Amon (band) =

American death metal band

- Origin: Tampa, Florida
- Genre: Death metal
- Years active: 2007–present
- Label: Hammerheart Records
- Spinoff of: Deicide
- Members: Eric Hoffman; Brian Hoffman

Amon is an American death metal band consisting of former Deicide guitarists Eric and Brian Hoffman, originally formed in Tampa, Florida in 2007. The band is named after the original name used by Deicide.

== History ==
Amon was originally formed in Tampa, Florida in 1987. Amon was the name originally used by the band that would later become Deicide. They were originally called Carnage. They performed traditional heavy metal in the vein of Iron Maiden and Judas Priest before evolving to death metal. Two demos were originally recorded and released under the Amon name – Feasting The Beast and Sacrificial in 1987 and 1989, respectively. The band changed their name to Deicide in 1989 after signing to Roadrunner Records. The demos were eventually released under the Deicide name in 1993 as Amon: Feasting The Beast. The Hoffman brothers reclaimed the name following their acrimonious split from Deicide in 2004 after recording seven albums with the band. Although Deicide frontman Glen Benton claimed that the brothers had voluntarily quit on their own, Eric Hoffman maintained that "no one quit Deicide," and that they had actually been fired.

The Hoffmans regrouped as Amon in 2007, entered the studio in December 2010 and were in the mixing process by September 2011. They released a full-length album titled Liar In Wait in 2012, which was produced by Mark Prator at RedRoom Recorders in Tampa. The album was independently released, and Brian Hoffman stated that its production and distribution were financed "out of [his] own savings."

They played two shows in Tampa in 2017. George "Corpsegrinder" Fisher of Cannibal Corpse performed guest vocals on two songs in the setlist. Benton openly mocked the inclusion of classic Deicide songs in the set to Blabbermouth, calling Amon "the official cover band" due to them performing the songs without the "original singer".

The band signed to Hammerheart Records in 2018, which resulted in an agreement to reissue Deicide's back catalog as well as the original two Amon demos. The band was scheduled to record and release a follow-up to Liar In Wait, as well as embark on a global tour in 2019. A spokesperson for Hammerheart said of the new material: "We heard new songs, and they have the classic Amon/Deicide crunch/vibe. They are catchy yet brutal, they are quality death metal par excellence." That same year, Eric Hoffman posted a diatribe against Benton to Facebook, accusing him of fraud and threatening him with physical assault. He did this again in 2022. Both posts have since been deleted. Music news website MetalSucks suggested that Hoffman was likely intoxicated while writing these posts.

As of 2026, a follow-up album to Liar in Wait has yet to be released. In 2024, Deicide drummer Steve Asheim told a YouTube interviewer that he had heard rumors that Eric and Brian Hoffman were no longer on speaking terms.

== Musical style and influences ==
Amon guitarist Eric Hoffman described the sound as more technical than some of the music they created in Deicide, but "It's not too intricate, so it's still catchy at the same time. You'll still have a couple of classic Deicide beginnings, and then it'll go into some killer technical, in-your-face shit." Extreme metal bands that influenced the Hoffman brothers in their youth include thrash metal bands Destruction, Slayer and Sodom, early black metal bands such as Venom, Bathory and Mayhem, and early death metal bands such as Possessed, Death and Autopsy.

== Discography ==
=== Studio albums ===
List of studio albums
Title	Details
Liar in Wait	Released: May 23, 2012; Label: Self-released; Format: CD, cassette, LP, digital download, streaming

=== Compilations ===
List of compilations
Title	Details
Sacrificial	Released: November 4, 2016; Label: Buried by Time and Dust Records; Format: Vinyl
Escape the Flesh	Released: September 7, 2019; Label: Eiter Records; Format: CD
Sacrificial / Feasting the Beast	Released: August 2023; Label: Darkness Shall Rise Productions; Format: CD

=== Demos ===
List of demos
Title	Details
Feasting the Beast	Released: August 1987; Label: Self-released; Format: Cassette
Sacrificial	Released: 1989; Label: Self-released; Format: Cassette

== See also ==
- Glen Benton#Eric and Brian Hoffman
