= Overtures of Blasphemy =

2018 album by Deicide

Studio album by Deicide
- Released: September 14, 2018
- Studio: AudioHammer Studios, Sanford, Florida
- Genre: Death metal
- Length: 37:54
- Label: Century Media
- Producer: Jason Suecof

Deicide chronology
In the Minds of Evil (2013)	Overtures of Blasphemy (2018)	Banished by Sin (2024)

Singles from Overtures of Blasphemy
- 1. "Excommunicated" Released: July 13, 2018; 2. "Seal the Tomb Below" Released: August 10, 2018; 3. "Defying the Sacred" Released: August 31, 2018

Overtures of Blasphemy is the twelfth studio album by American death metal band Deicide. It was released on September 14, 2018, through Century Media Records.

The cover artwork was created by Zbigniew M. Bielak, who has also worked with Ghost, Paradise Lost, and Mayhem. This is the band's only record to feature guitarist Mark English of Monstrosity, who replaced Jack Owen in 2016.

== Reception ==
Professional ratings
Review scores
Source	Rating
Metal Injection	8.5/10
Exclaim!	5/10
Louder Sound	4/5 stars

The album received mixed to positive reviews. Metal Injection said "the album definitely belongs in the top half of Deicide's discography", Decibel said that "by track four, it has already muscled its way into the upper echelons of the band’s storied discography". Conversely, Exclaim! writer Joe Smith-Engelhardt called the album a "sore spot" in Deicide's career.

== Track listing ==
No.	Title	Writer(s)	Length
1.	"One with Satan"	Glen Benton	3:46
2.	"Crawled from the Shadows"	Benton; Steve Asheim	3:20
3.	"Seal the Tomb Below"	Benton; Kevin Quirion	2:57
4.	"Compliments of Christ"	Benton	2:44
5.	"All That Is Evil"	Benton; Asheim	3:24
6.	"Excommunicated"	Benton; Quirion	2:55
7.	"Anointed in Blood"	Benton; Quirion	3:18
8.	"Crucified Soul of Salvation"	Benton; Asheim	3:00
9.	"Defying the Sacred"	Benton; Quirion	3:30
10.	"Consumed by Hatred"	Benton	3:02
11.	"Flesh, Power, Dominion"	Benton; Quirion; Asheim	3:33
12.	"Destined to Blasphemy"	Benton; Quirion	2:25
Total length:			37:54

== Personnel ==
- Glen Benton – bass, vocals
- Steve Asheim – drums, additional guitars
- Kevin Quirion – guitars
- Mark English – guitars

== Charts ==
Chart (2018)	Peak position
Austrian Albums (Ö3 Austria)	23
Belgian Albums (Ultratop Flanders)	59
Belgian Albums (Ultratop Wallonia)	103
Czech Albums (ČNS IFPI)	59
Finnish Albums (Suomen virallinen lista)	42
German Albums (Offizielle Top 100)	22
Scottish Albums (OCC)	79
Swiss Albums (Schweizer Hitparade)	42
