= Adrift (band) =

American heavy rock band

- Origin: Tampa, FL, United States
- Genres: Hard rock Heavy metal
- Years active: 2002–present
- Labels: Independent
- Members: Jack Owen; Dean Pskowski; Jen Parker; Kevin D. Astl
- Past members: Mark Elm; Michael Capuano; Analia Pearl; Tony Teegarden
- Website: Official Myspace

Adrift is a Tampa, Florida-based American heavy rock band featuring Jack Owen, former guitarist for Deicide and Cannibal Corpse, on guitar. Other members include Kevin Astl on drums, Jen Parker (Animosity) on bass, and vocalist Dean Pskowski (Synapse).

== History ==
Adrift began in early 2002, as former Cannibal Corpse guitarist Jack Owen was looking to write more diverse styles of music and sought other like-minded musicians.

A demo was quickly recorded in 2003 with producer Jason Suecof and was discussed on blogs when Jack announced his departure from Cannibal Corpse.

In 2004, the band performed at the Big Spring Jam in Huntsville, Alabama, which also saw performances from Lynyrd Skynyrd, Switchfoot and Collective Soul.

Dean Pskowski was brought into the band in 2005 along with bass player Jen Parker.

Another demo was recorded and mixed in 2005-2006 with producer John Hughes II.

== Absolution ==
In June 2007, Adrift entered CB Productions Studios in Raleigh, North Carolina to begin recording Absolution, their first full album. A single, "Back To Square One," was posted on the band's Myspace page and had over 60,000 plays in the first week. The second single, "Held Down," along with "Back To Square One," and other songs, have totaled over 190,000 plays.

Absolution was self-released by the band on December 1, 2007, and has sold over 2,200 copies. The band is currently negotiating with record labels regarding its formal release to radio and to the public.

=== Track listing ===
All songs are written by Adrift.

1. "Betrayed" – 3:42
2. "You Don't Know Me" – 2:59
3. "Wither Away" – 4:12
4. "Pushed Aside" – 4:48
5. "Back To Square One" – 3:13
6. "Absolution" – 3:36
7. "S.I.C.C." – 3:35
8. "Held Down" – 3:23
9. "Departure" – 3:36
10. "Come Around" – 3:13
11. "Left Behind" – 4:04

=== Personnel ===
==== Musicians ====
- Jack Owen - guitars, backing vocals
- Dean Pskowski - vocals
- Jen Parker - bass
- Kevin Astl - drums

==== Production and technical credits ====
- Adrift - record producer
- Mark Lewis - co-producer, engineer, mixer
- David Burrill - co-producer
- Steve Holderfield - assistant tracking and engineering
- Alan Douches - mastering
