= Banished by Sin =

2024 album by Deicide

Studio album by Deicide
- Released: April 26, 2024
- Studio: Smoke & Mirrors, Spring Hill, Florida
- Genre: Death metal
- Length: 38:59
- Label: Reigning Phoenix Music
- Producer: Deicide

Deicide chronology
Overtures of Blasphemy (2018)	Banished by Sin (2024)

Banished by Sin is the thirteenth studio album by American death metal band Deicide. It was released on April 26, 2024, through Reigning Phoenix Music. It is the first record to feature guitarist Taylor Nordberg, who joined in 2022, and the last one to feature guitarist Kevin Quirion, who left the band in 2025.

== Background ==
On July 18, 2023, Deicide signed a one-album deal with Reigning Phoenix Music, while also announcing the new studio album would be titled Banished by Sin. On February 14, 2024, they released the single "Sever The Tongue" and revealed details about the album.

== Reception ==
Banished by Sin was named "album of the month" on metallian.com in May 2024.

== Track listing ==
No.	Title	Length
1.	"From Unknown Heights You Shall Fall"	3:25
2.	"Doomed to Die"	3:11
3.	"Sever the Tongue"	3:25
4.	"Faithless"	3:26
5.	"Bury the Cross... with Your Christ"	2:55
6.	"Woke from God"	3:03
7.	"Ritual Defied"	3:36
8.	"Failures of Your Dying Lord"	3:22
9.	"Banished by Sin"	3:04
10.	"A Trinity of None"	3:26
11.	"I Am I... a Curse of Death"	3:00
12.	"The Light Defeated"	3:06
Total length:		38:59

== Personnel ==
- Glen Benton – bass, vocals
- Steve Asheim – drums, additional guitars
- Kevin Quirion – guitars
- Taylor Nordberg – guitars
