= In Torment in Hell =

Studio album by Deicide
- Released: September 25, 2001
- Recorded: April 9–13, 2001
- Studio: Morrisound Recording (Tampa)
- Genre: Death metal
- Length: 30:59
- Label: Roadrunner
- Producer: Deicide

Deicide chronology
Insineratehymn (2000)	In Torment in Hell (2001)	The Best of Deicide (2003)

In Torment in Hell is the sixth studio album by Florida death metal band Deicide. It was released on September 25, 2001, on Roadrunner Records.

== Background and recording ==
Deicide wrote and recorded the album primarily to fulfill contractual obligations with Roadrunner Records. Benton recalled the circumstances surrounding the album's writing and recording process: "They were shelving all the records. What’s the point of fucking putting all this effort and all this hard work into something that’s gonna get thrown in the fucking garbage can? We had reached our point with Roadrunner where we just stopped cooperating. Our last two records with them were just obligations, just throw ‘em the fuck out. And to me, those records are repetitious and redundant and I just, you know – to me, it was either that or give them a country record or a fucking Gospel album."

Steve Asheim recalled in 2024: "We were looking for greener pastures. Roadrunner, for whatever reason, had us under this long contract, but didn't want to invest in us anymore. It's like, 'well, why not just drop us?' But they were hanging onto us on this leash, and like I said, nu metal was in. Slipknot was their big new band. They didn't give a shit about us for many years. [...] So yes, we were forced to work our way out of this thing."

The album was recorded on a $5,000 budget over a four-day period.

== Music ==
The album's style is characterized by "belched vocals and speed-for-its-own-sake musical excess." Steve Asheim's drums have been described as sounding "tinny", drawing comparisons to the drum sound of Metallica drummer Lars Ulrich on the album St. Anger. Decibel likened Glen Benton's vocals to Tom Warrior of Celtic Frost on the track “Vengeance Will Be Mine," going as far to suspect him of trolling.

== Artwork ==
The album's interior artwork contains no band photos. According to drummer Steve Asheim, personal tensions between the band members were so high during this period that frontman Glen Benton was unable to be in the same room simultaneously with guitarists Eric and Brian Hoffman. Tensions only eased due to the newfound excitement of subsequently signing to Earache Records, before the Hoffmans left the band in 2004 because of publishing disputes.

== Reception and legacy ==
Professional ratings
Review scores
Source	Rating
Allmusic	2.5/5 stars
Chronicles of Chaos	6/10
Collector's Guide to Heavy Metal	0/10
Kerrang!	4/5 stars
NME	2/10
Rolling Stone	unfavorable

The album drew criticism for what was perceived as rushed production and lackluster songwriting. Decibel stated that the album is widely considered to be "the biggest turd in Deicide’s career." The label pressured the band for a quick follow-up to Insineratehymn, but Deicide failed to meet the original July 31 release date deadline. The band rarely plays any songs from this album live.

NME gave the album a scathing review: "There is no depth here: that’s why pseudo-horned mortals love it so. The Deicide ethos has always been embedded in the twin troughs of comedy grunt and kindergarten profanity; and insecure, misplaced little men will always find solace in those phenomena. And with ceaseless, quick-step swamp metal rhythms toiling throughout ‘In Torment In Hell’, it sure adds up to a pretty miserable half-hour. Evil – but not in the way it was intended."

Reflecting on the album in 2006, drummer Steve Asheim conceded that the album's weaknesses were not solely attributable to record label difficulties. He was quoted saying:

I think that whole period was brought on by being burnt out, but not on music or the business, just burnt out on each other. I kind of always thought we were being kept down by our record company and stuff like that, but after we did In Torment [in Hell] and were finished with our deal and moved on to a great deal with Earache, we were still not up to 100%. By then, it was obvious to me that it wasn't the record company's fault, it was us, we were sick of each other. Well, basically, the Hoffmans and Glen were totally sick of and hated each other, and the quality of the band's work and the fans suffered for it.

== Track listing ==
All tracks are written by Glen Benton and Deicide (Steve Asheim).

No.	Title	Length
1.	"In Torment in Hell"	4:02
2.	"Christ Don't Care"	2:51
3.	"Vengeance Will Be Mine"	4:24
4.	"Imminent Doom"	3:41
5.	"Child of God"	3:35
6.	"Let It Be Done"	3:34
7.	"Worry in the House of Thieves"	4:16
8.	"Lurking Among Us"	4:36
Total length:		30:59

== Personnel ==
- Glen Benton – bass, vocals
- Eric Hoffman – guitars
- Brian Hoffman – guitars
- Steve Asheim – drums
- Deicide – production, mixing

== Charts ==
=== Monthly ===
Year	Chart	Position
2001	Poland (ZPAV Top 100)	27
