= Till Death Do Us Part (Deicide album) =

Studio album by Deicide
- Released: April 28, 2008
- Recorded: October – December 2007
- Studio: Morrisound Studios (Tampa, FL)
- Genre: Death metal
- Length: 42:07
- Label: Earache
- Producer: Steve Asheim

Deicide chronology
The Stench of Redemption (2006)	Till Death Do Us Part (2008)	To Hell with God (2011)

Professional ratings
Review scores
Source	Rating
AllMusic	3.5/5 stars
Blabbermouth.net	7.5/10
Chronicles of Chaos	9/10
MetalSucks	3.5/5
Record Collector	4/5 stars
The Collector's Guide to Heavy Metal	5/10

Till Death Do Us Part is the ninth studio album by American death metal band Deicide. It was released on April 28, 2008, via Earache Records, marking the band's third and final album for the label. Recording sessions took place at Morrisound Studios in Tampa from October to December 2007. Production was handled by member Steve Asheim.

This is the band's longest album, being 42 minutes long and presenting some doom metal influences. Initial copies of the album included a sew-on patch with an image of vocalist Glen Benton and the phrase "Glen Benton for President". The album was also released on several colours of vinyl in limited numbers. The artwork of the album cover is a segment of the painting Woman and Death (1518–1520) by Hans Baldung.

== Track listing ==
All lyrics are written by Glen Benton; all music is composed by Steve Asheim.

No.	Title	Length
1.	"The Beginning of the End"	3:40
2.	"Till Death Do Us Part"	4:14
3.	"Hate of All Hatreds"	3:53
4.	"In the Eyes of God"	4:43
5.	"Worthless Misery"	4:59
6.	"Severed Ties"	4:01
7.	"Not as Long as We Both Shall Live"	5:05
8.	"Angel of Agony"	3:29
9.	"Horror in the Halls of Stone"	6:23
10.	"The End of the Beginning"	1:40
Total length:		42:07

== Personnel ==
- Glen Benton – lyrics, vocals, bass, executive producer, art direction
- Steve Asheim – lead guitar (tracks: 1, 6, 8, 9), drums, producer, mixing, mastering
- Ralph Santolla – lead guitar (tracks: 1–9)
- Jack Owen – lead guitar (tracks: 6–8, 10)
- Jim Morris – engineering, mixing, mastering
- Summer Lacy – design, layout

== Charts ==
Chart (2008)	Peak position
French Albums (SNEP)	168
Swedish Albums (Sverigetopplistan)	56
