= Glen Benton =

American bassist and vocalist

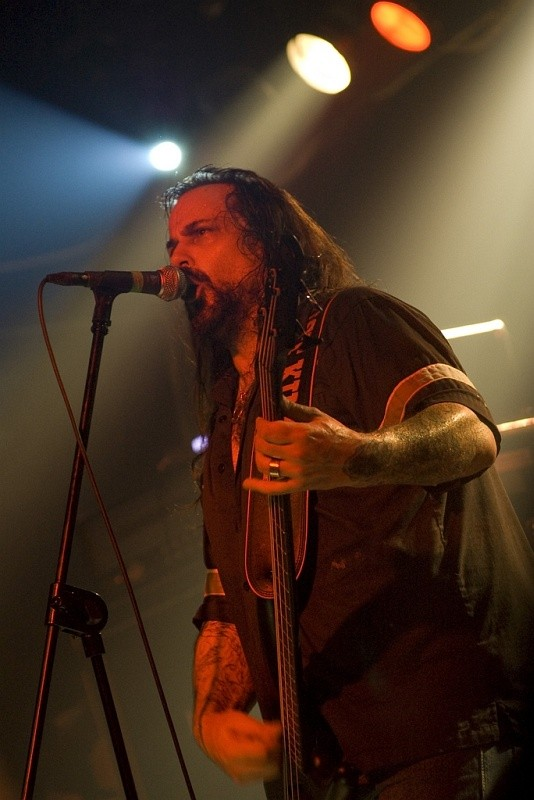
- Benton in 2009

Background information
- Born: Glen Michael Benton; June 18, 1967 (age 59); Niagara Falls, New York, U.S.
- Genre: Death metal
- Occupations: Musician; songwriter
- Instruments: Vocals; bass
- Years active: 1985–present

Glen Michael Benton (born June 18, 1967) is an American musician, best known as the lead vocalist, bassist and lyricist for the Florida death metal band Deicide. He and drummer Steve Asheim are the only original members left in the band. He was also a member of the band Vital Remains, occasionally recording and performing with the band.

Benton is considered to be among the most prominent and influential "Satanic" death metal musicians in the subgenre's history. He is known for his extremely low and powerful growls, high shrieks, and overtly anti-Christian lyrics. He also widely recognized for an inverted cross that he had burned into his forehead several times during his youth. His music and personal life have been subject to controversy at various points throughout his career.

== Early life and education ==
Glen Michael Benton was born in Niagara Falls, New York but was raised in Clearwater, Florida. His family eventually relocated back to New York only to relocate back to Florida several years later.

Benton's resentment of organized religion, for which he would eventually become notorious, began at an early age. His father was a practicing Roman Catholic and his mother was Lutheran, and he was dealt what he described as "the worst of both worlds." Additionally, Benton's mother was a Sunday school teacher, and he recalled being forced to participate in his church's Christmas pageant at age 8 against his will. He said: "I was singing at the front of the church thinking, 'How did I get myself into this shit?'" He also stated that the family "lived at war with each other" due to differences in religion. He stated: "People wonder why I am the way I am, well I say man, I was exposed to things at an early age that were like, creepy, haunting and fucked up at the same time." Benton was expelled from several public schools in Niagara Falls before enrolling in Catholic school, where he jokingly recalled not "even [making] it past the first 20 minutes."

Like his dissension of religion, Benton's interest in music also began at an early age; he claimed he knew he wanted to be a professional musician as early as age "9 or 10". He described himself as "the kid in the mirror rocking out with a tennis racket", naming Chuck Berry, The Beatles, Little Richard, Elvis Presley and The Rolling Stones as his earliest inspirations. He eventually began creating music by experimenting with his father's guitars, claiming to have been heckled by his brother in the process. Benton's musical interests took a drastic turn when he was exposed to Black Sabbath for the first time. He reflected, "I remember being at the breakfast table 7:30 in the morning with my boombox blasting ‘Paranoid’ at my mother." Benton later worked in a local record store, which exposed him to extreme metal. He decided he wanted to become a metal vocalist during a night spent tripping on psychedelics and listening to the album Seven Churches by Possessed.

== Musical career ==
On July 21, 1987, after guitarist Brian Hoffman replied to Benton's advertisement in a local music magazine, Deicide was formed. Within days the band, consisting of Benton (bass/vocals), Hoffman, Hoffman's brother Eric (guitars) and Steve Asheim (drums), was named "Amon", after the Egyptian deity. Within a month, Amon had recorded the crude Feasting the Beast 8-track demo in Benton's garage and had started playing the occasional gig in the Tampa area. In 1989, Amon recorded their second demo, Sacrificial, at Morrisound with producer Scott Burns.

Benton had his tonsils removed when he was 24 years old, following the release of Deicide's second album Legion. The procedure was financed by Roadrunner Records. He toured Europe with Deicide two weeks later while still recovering from the surgery.

Since 1990, Benton has recorded and released thirteen full-length studio albums with Deicide, the most recent being Banished by Sin in 2024.

== Artistry ==
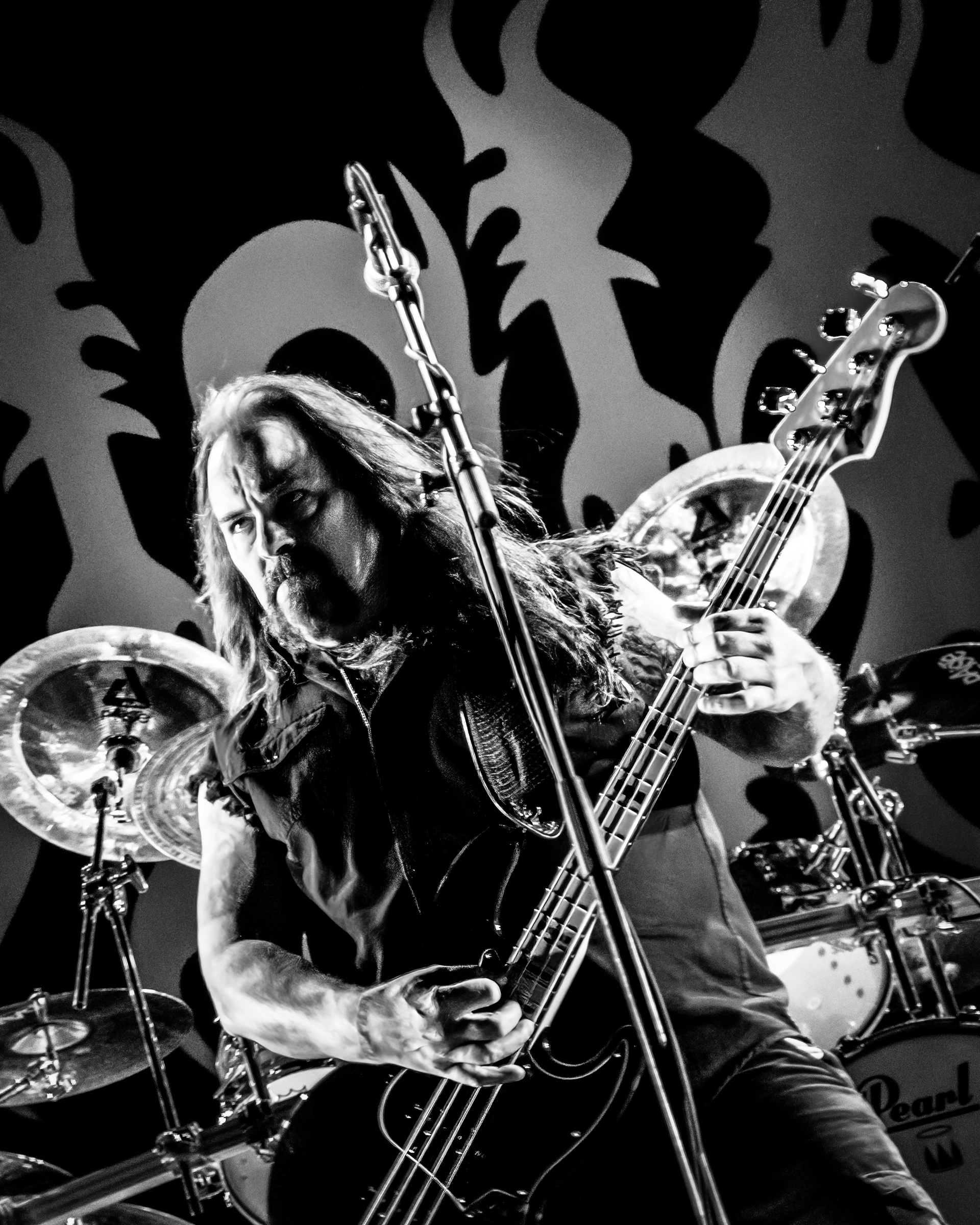
Benton at Midgardsblot 2019

=== Stage persona ===
Benton was notorious for his unyieldingly provocative public persona early in Deicide's career, and was known for making bizarre and shocking statements to the music press during this time. In a 1991 interview, Benton stated that his intention was "to create the most evil-est music and to gain entrance into the seven gates of hell," describing Deicide's live performances as a "focal point to express [his] Satanism." He described his understanding of demonic possession as "when you come to a certain point [where] there's no turning back [...] and your body is possessed, and there's no way you can turn back."

Benton recalls being referred to as "the evil little bastard" by family members while he was growing up. He said: "I just fell into it, and it’s the persona I’ve had ever since I was a little kid, through school and through everything else. I don’t even really know why, but do I get off on raising eyebrows and ruffling feathers? Fuck yeah, I do! [...] Most kids rebel, and I wanted to fight the powers." He claims he is motivated by dissenters, saying "the more you tell me not to do this, I'm gonna do it." Benton has cited Black Sabbath, Dio, Judas Priest, Ozzy Osbourne, and Ronnie James Dio as influences on his showmanship. Early in Deicide's career, Benton wore an armored suit with spikes while performing, which he said was to deter stage divers. He recalled: "They would come smashing into me! That’s why I was wearing that shit — to keep them idiots from jumping on top of me. I used to wear all the armor, but nowadays things have changed, man. Once you’ve been sued a few times you learn to roll it back."

=== Lyrical themes ===
Benton writes all of Deicide's lyrics, and the band's themes rarely deviate from blasphemous topics such and anti-Christian sentiment and Satanism. Benton stated that: "It’s beaten into me, so I can’t sing about anything else. If I try to sing about other things, I draw a complete blank. I let the universe speak through me, and if I have to force it, it just won’t come." Comparing lyrical composition to defecating, he stated that "you want it to [...] flow out of you naturally." He further explained that his lyricisms are not intended to exclusively attack Christianity, saying: "When I say God or Christianity or Jesus, whatever you want to refer to it, I mean all your Jesuses, all your gods, all your so-called prophets, all religions. All of it. I'm not picking on one. I'm picking on all of it, okay? People can interpret it the way they want to interpret it, towards their god or whatever."

Benton attempts to incorporate double messages into his lyrics, and claims to have been deeply disturbed by some of the messages he has heard while playing Deicide songs backwards.

=== Bass playing and vocal style ===
Benton's vocals alternative between high shrieks, death growls, and screaming (which he self-describes as his "angry man voice"). Benton claims that getting his tonsils removed at age 24 has contributed to the tone of his singing voice.

Although Benton played bass guitar with his fingers early in Deicide's career, he eventually switched to using a pick. He found a pick easier to play with the speed and precision required for the band's music, and also said his approach to bass guitar "should be more like a guitar. It's just like playing rhythm guitar". He self-describes as "more of a rhythm player," and composes many of his musical contributions to Deicide on the guitar.

== Equipment ==
In May 2015, Benton was endorsed by ESP guitars, and has been using a custom-made EX bass with a reverse headstock and EMG pick-ups since then. He has also used Phoenix and Stream bass models.

== Public image and legacy ==
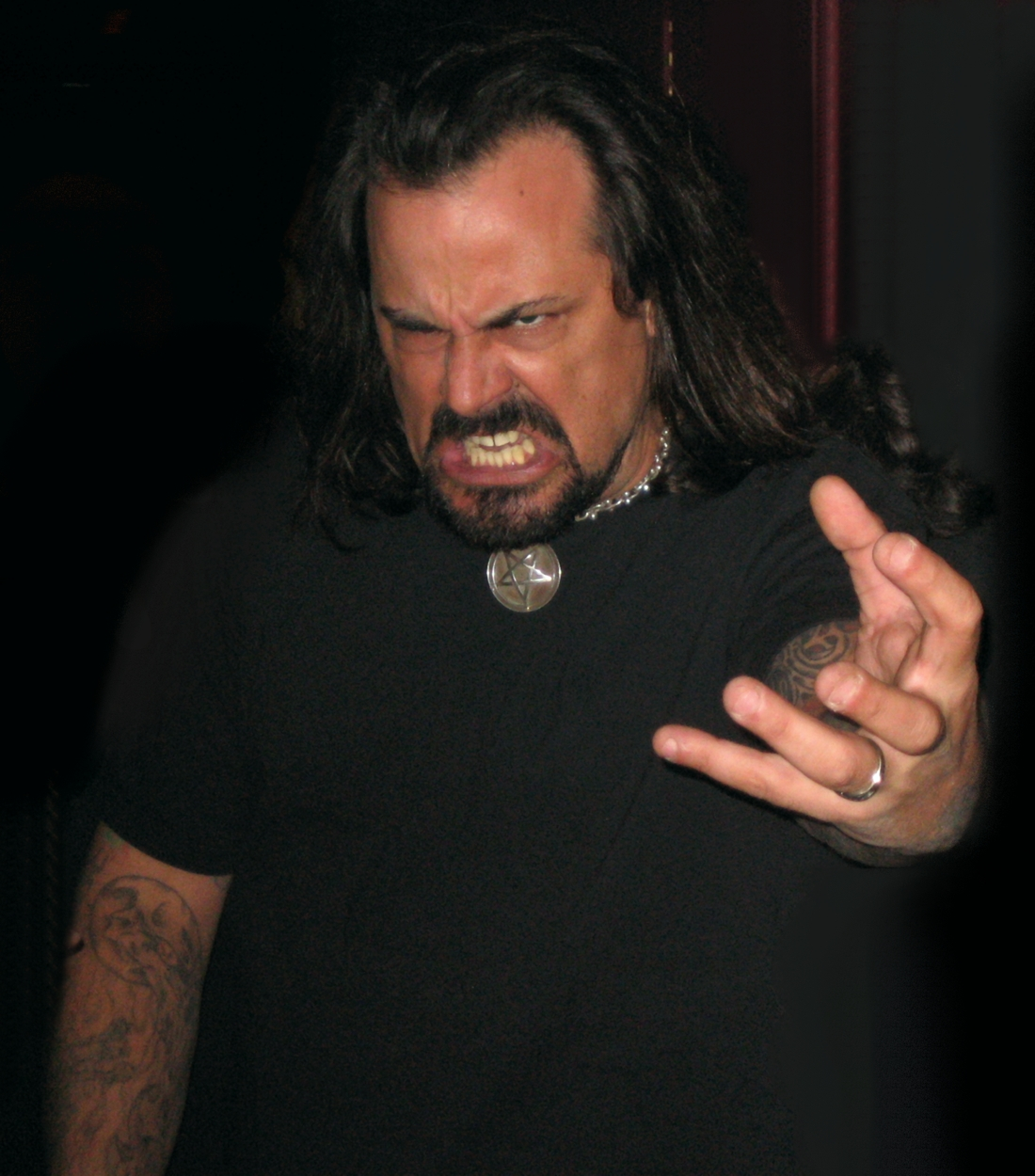
Benton in 2006

Benton is considered to be one of the most recognizable and influential extreme metal frontmen of all time. Described as "an artist whose public persona and music will forever be intertwined," Benton has been referred to as "the face of Satanic death metal". Metal Injection said Benton "will absolutely go down as one of death metal's most well-known characters." MetalSucks called him "hilarious and insane". In light of this, Benton has personally expressed the sentiment that modern heavy metal acts lack the theatric personalities in their frontpeople that inspired him during his youth, such as Ozzy Osbourne and Elvis Presley.

Benton is notorious for an inverted cross he has repeatedly branded into his forehead over the years, beginning when he was 22. According to Deicide drummer Steve Asheim, this act was likely in response to previous press attention the band received when Brian Hoffman burned an inverted cross into his arm with a cigarette. Benton said in 2024: "To this day, I don’t know what the fuck I was thinking, but I knew that I had been christened Catholic as a child, and I felt that the best way to take care of that would be my symbolic way of taking that Catholic mark off of my skin." Later that same year, he told Hells Headbangers Records co-founder Justin Horval that he had always wanted to do it, and "thought it would be cool". He estimated that he had burned the cross into his skin twelve times, adding that the most recent time he was able to see veins and bone from his skull. He eventually ceased this practice after his mother begged him to do so.

The nature of Benton's Satanism is obscure and a subject of controversy, particularly due to allegations by former Deicide guitarist Eric Hoffman, who dismissed it as insincere and spurious. However, Benton's claims are generally considered to have always been tongue-in-cheek, as his purported Satanism has since largely been defined as vehement anti-Christian atheism complemented with theatrics suitable for the band. Additionally, Benton has called himself a "showman," and has stated that there is no ideological agenda in Deicide, and that the music is foremost.

== Religious beliefs ==
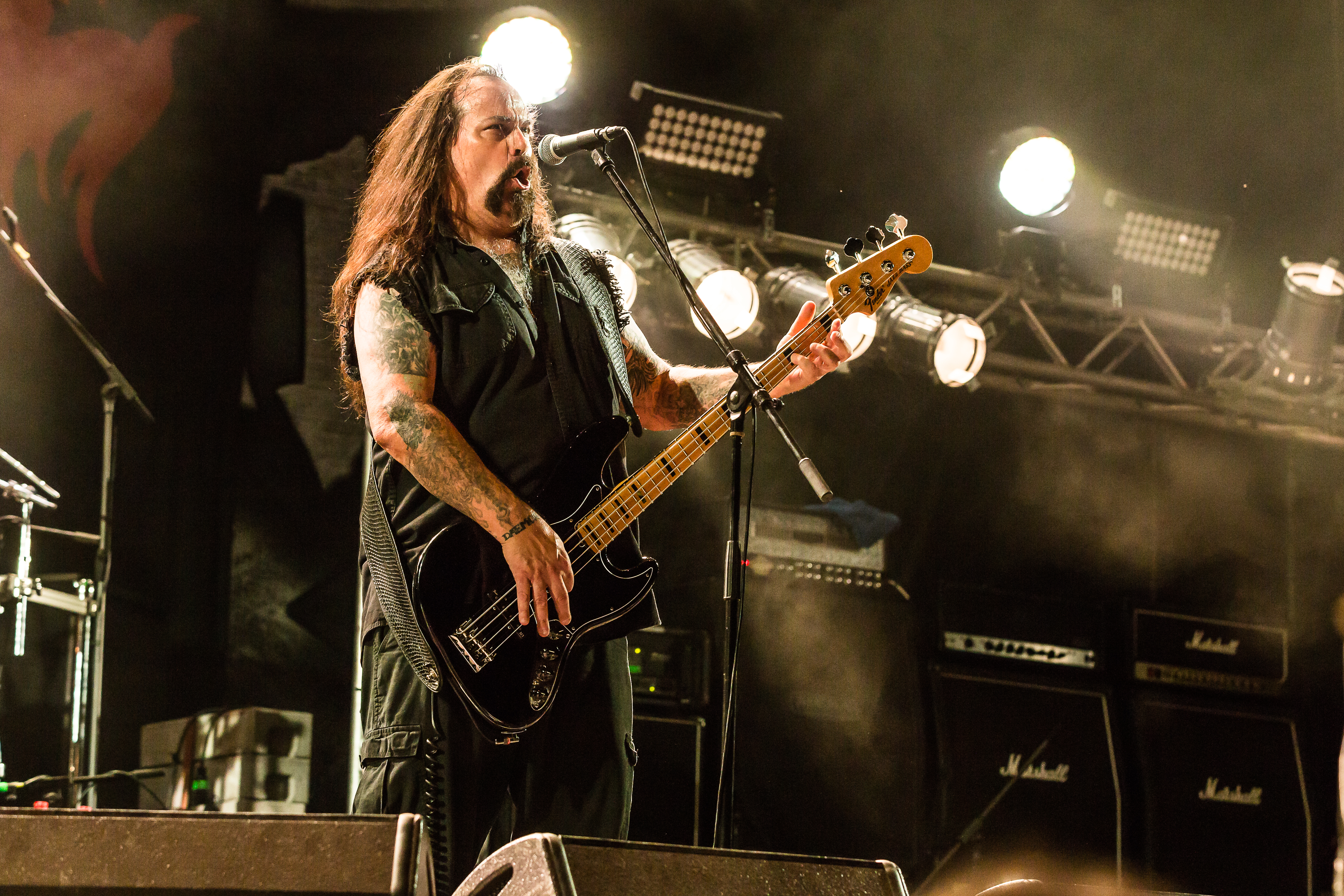
Benton performing in 2019

Benton has expressed vehement antireligious sentiment throughout his career, and claims to have held these personal values since his childhood. He is quoted saying: "I think people know how to treat each other, and don’t need a book full of bullshit to tell them how to do it." He also stated: "I do believe in good and I believe in doing good. Now, do I believe that if my neighbor's a fucking asshole, I should like him and turn the other cheek? Fuck that. If you want me to treat you good, you have to earn it." Despite the lyrical content of Deicide, Benton does not dismiss all who believe in God; he has explained that broadly despising all Christians or theists would entail "hav[ing] nothing to do with" many people in his life, including his parents. He further explained: "That's just ignorance to condemn somebody for what they believe. That would be totally a hypocrisy to what I do. I believe what I believe and I have the freedom to do that. [...] I ain't gonna condemn you for believing in God, I just think you're an idiot."

However, in an interview with music magazine Seconds, Benton stated that he did in fact hold spiritual beliefs and engaged in prayer: "I know that when I talk to my god - and it ain't Jehovah - who I talk to in my head, and who I pray to - if you want to call it that - that I have someone looking over me."

In 2018, Benton outright rejected the Satanist label, contending that had been tagged as such by the religious right in the United States, and stating he prefers to perceive himself as simply a "free thinker". He said: "They labeled me and generalized me, so I generalize it all back. It's all a business. Just like they make money off of God, I make money off of them." Despite his rejection of Anton LaVey's Church of Satan and the Satanist label in general, Benton claims to be ordained at "several" Satanic institutions that do not require a monetary entrance fee. He is quoted in the music history book Raising Hell saying: "I think any organized religion is hokey if you've got to pay to belong. So, I don't know what that makes me."

== Personal politics ==
Despite having admitted to have voted in previous US elections, by 2022 Benton had publicly implied that he was apolitical. When pressed regarding his personal opinions on Joe Biden, Donald Trump and Black Lives Matter in a YouTube interview, Benton replied: "Man, you know what? I have a saying, and I live by it: 'Politics are for assholes.' I'll leave it at that."

He had previously stated during the 2012 United States presidential election: "The people we have running for president are nothing more than talk shows hosts. It’s a farce, an absolute joke. There’s no one with any sincerity, no one real. I want to see a real person run for president. I want a real person with real person problems running for president. Some rich guy with rich guy problems, they think us schmucks at the bottom don’t mean shit." In 2012 he admitted to have voted for Ronald Reagan, George H. W. Bush, Al Gore (claiming he was 'one of the lost Florida votes'), George W. Bush, and Barack Obama, respectively. Benton has expressed anti-imperialist views regarding US involvement overseas. He is quoted as follows: "I travel around the world and don’t need to hear fucked up opinions about us. But they are opinions about the guy running the country. We need to bring all our kids home, get the hell out of all these other countries and focus on making this the best country in the world. Why can’t we do that? We’re falling apart fast. I’m a child of the 70s and I was lucky I was able to taste that innocence."

== Controversies ==
In 1992, newspapers reported that Benton had expressed an interest in, and participated in, the slaughter of live rodents such as rats and squirrels. During an interview with NME, Benton shot a squirrel in the head with a pellet gun; Benton explained that it was done to prevent any further damage to his electrical system and other contents in the attic of his home where the interview was being held. The publicity led to an attempted bomb attack on Benton during Deicide's Legion tour at the International 2 in Manchester, England, by an animal rights organization. Benton was also beaten up in Bradford. A similar attack was attempted at a previous show in Stockholm, where a supposed small fire bomb was set to detonate during Deicide's set. No one was injured, but the bomb damaged the venue. The bomb was reported to be an M-80. The tour was curtailed.

Deicide also caused controversy early in its career when Benton tossed rotting animal meat into the crowd. Benton recalled: “I didn’t think playing shows with rotting meat as part of our set-up was gonna cause that much of a shitstorm. Within three shows of that stuff I had the authorities bearing down on me, so it was a very short-lived moment in Deicide history.”

== Feuds ==
=== Bob Larson ===
In the early to mid-1990s, Benton was a frequent opponent guest to Christian radio shows, such as Bob Larson's Talk Back show. Serious discussions rarely took place between the two on the program, and the exchanges mainly consisted of taunts from Benton and tongue-in-cheek teasing. Larson continually invited Benton to his talk show, but Benton often declined. Benton claimed he was "roped into" the appearances on Larson's show, which he said were arranged by Roadrunner Records. Despite rumors that Benton had mailed a scab to Larson, the former eventually refuted these claims in 2009, saying: "Bob Larson is a fucking carny. He's a showman, like myself. He does what he does for ratings and to sell his fucking cult-shit videotapes and his cassettes to you, the weak-minded fuck. Okay? [...] Bob Larson has actually admitted this shit to me. Bob Larson and me are actually kind of friends. [...] Bob Larson does what he does to make fucking money to support his prostitute habits." When asked about Larson in 2012, Benton said: "We all know about Bob. Bob knows we know. And then Bob gets asked questions he can’t answer anymore."

=== Eric and Brian Hoffman ===
I will collect what has been rightfully owned and that scum fuck Glen and the Turtles, they only care about themselves. I will never stop death metal and yes we will kick your ass Glen any time any place. I will collect my money clearly fraud scum fuck. You say gloves are off your better put some on, the anger in me, your head will spin around like the fucking exorcist, you know where I live, welcome anytime collecting all my merch for royalties for 20 years and royalties for 13 on scars believe me I will not let you get away with this, we will meet again, anger is building and has it’s vengeance. Yes again he was hired I drew the logo found the name. that’s why I use his name AMON. fucking prick.

— Former Deicide guitarist Eric Hoffman on Benton (2019)

Original Deicide guitarists Eric and Brian Hoffman acutely left the band in late 2004 due to disagreements with Benton over royalties and publishing rights. The Hoffmans initially denied quitting the band on their own accord, and insisted that they were fired. According to Eric Hoffman, "No one quit Deicide. We split all royalties and publishing, or no deal. Glen wrote one song musically: 'Trifixion', then I arranged it, in his whole career and one part in 'Dead By Dawn'. Yes, very brutal." Benton contested this claim, telling Blabbermouth in 2006 that the Hoffmans were told that the new publishing deal was based on "who wrote what" rather than the previous four-way split, due to waning contribution on their part. The brothers promptly quit the band upon receiving publishing checks for Scars and realizing that they had only received payment for a handful of the album's tracks. Benton also claimed that Eric Hoffman had harassed and threatened Steve Asheim, as well as "talking shit on Blabbermouth about Steve's dad dying", with Benton vowing to defend himself should he catch the guitarist trespassing on his property.

I respect my fans, I love my fans, most people can’t say that without them I’m nothing without them. After what happened when Glen Benton fucking took scars royalties for 20 years and all Deicide merchandise I will find you and hunt you down like the animal you are. I have no label and did my last album for the fans out of my own savings and will do it again with without label. I now pronounce curse on his hair piece Glen Michael Benton you will be history soon and Steve will hire new singer. Also remember this I am Deicide you are a disgusting individual that doesn’t care about anyone but himself Glen your Amon, not now, you’re not good enough. I drew the logo came up with the name. Unbelievable I am Amon suck it Glen we will meet again.

— Former Deicide guitarist Brian Hoffman on Benton (2022)

They later attempted to sue Glen Benton for the rights to the Deicide name. According to Eric Hoffman, they wanted to use the Deicide name for their new band, but Benton and Asheim had taken the name beforehand. In response, Benton countersued the Hoffmans in order to remove their names from the band's trademark. According to Eric Hoffman, Benton "says if he sees me, he's gonna shoot me and ask questions later. He hates me more than Jesus." Benton later compared his relationship with the Hoffmans to a "bad marriage".

In 2019, Eric Hoffman made a threatening Facebook post directed at Benton, calling him a fraud, and vowing to collect the royalties from Scars of the Crucifix. Benton responded on the Into the Combine podcast, saying that Eric "loses his mind" over the band proceeding without them. He also claimed Deicide's track record is much better than theirs, as since they departed, "they did one shitty album and tried ripping off the fans, charged them for videos and bullshit like that. And then from there, they’ve done two shitty shows here in the state of Florida, and from what I was told, they almost canceled those." Benton described them as a cover band since they didn't have the original singer.

In 2022, Brian Hoffman made a lengthy post on Facebook vowing to hunt Benton down for taking the royalties for Scars and the merchandise profits. That same year, Benton again reflected on the split in an interview with Chris Garza of Suicide Silence. According to Benton, the Hoffmans were unprofessional towards him and Asheim, who he believes were doing all the work. He said was ready to quit the band because of them and the fact that he was doing Vital Remains, but them quitting the band instead was a favor to him, though they wanted to "burn it down" upon leaving.

Benton also suggested that although his relationship with the Hoffmans was damaged beyond repair, the situation could be significantly improved by a simple apology from either of them, though he believed it was unlikely this would ever actually happen.

=== Corey Taylor ===
There was a feud between Benton and Slipknot vocalist Corey Taylor, stemming from the former's claim in 2018 that Taylor once promised to take Deicide on tour, but ultimately never followed through with his offer. Benton was quoted on the Talk Toomey podcast as follows:

"Not to fucking bust balls, but I’ll bust balls. [...] Slipknot: ‘Oh we’re going to take you guys out man, we’re going to take you guys out dude.’ Yeah, blow me. That's what I say to you. Fucking blow me Corey Taylor and all you fags. OK. ‘Oh we’re going to take Deicide out on tour with us and blah blah blah.’ Blowing air up our asses, back in the day. You know what, you never did a fucking thing for us. You introduced us at a show once. Great, thanks. How about a fucking tour? How about fucking helping us out a little bit? I mean we’ve only been doing this for several years. You guys were like, ‘Dude you were what got me started.’ Well you know what, return the fucking favor. You know what I mean?"

The following day, Taylor told Loudwire that he had no recollection of Deicide ever submitting for tours with Slipknot. Taylor said of Benton: "He wants to be pissed at me, go ahead -- get in line. Everybody's pissed at me. But don't talk shit on my guys and don't say shit that isn't fucking true."

Benton's language in his initial rant was described by Loudwire as "homophobic." Benton returned to Talk Toomey, and was quoted saying: "What people don’t understand is when I grew up, man, when we were kids and that, we used to call each other names like "fags." There was none of this cancel culture and political correctness bullshit. [My comments were] taken a little more harsher than I wanted it to be taken." He acknowledged the incident as a "learning experience."

In 2022, Taylor spoke about the incident in an interview with Rock 102.1 KFMA:

"I haven’t seen Glen Benton in 10 years and I haven’t talked to him in even longer. So I don’t know why he’s upset with me, I don’t know why he’s upset with us. [...] We take out the bands who submit for us. It’s just that simple. Out of respect to him and what Deicide has done over the years, it’s, like, if you talked to somebody, it wasn’t me, and they sure as hell didn’t talk to me, because I would have tried to do something. [...] At the end of the day, not everyone’s gonna like you, and you have to learn that. If you think everyone’s gonna like you, you need to get a helmet, because your life’s gonna be really sad."

== Personal life ==
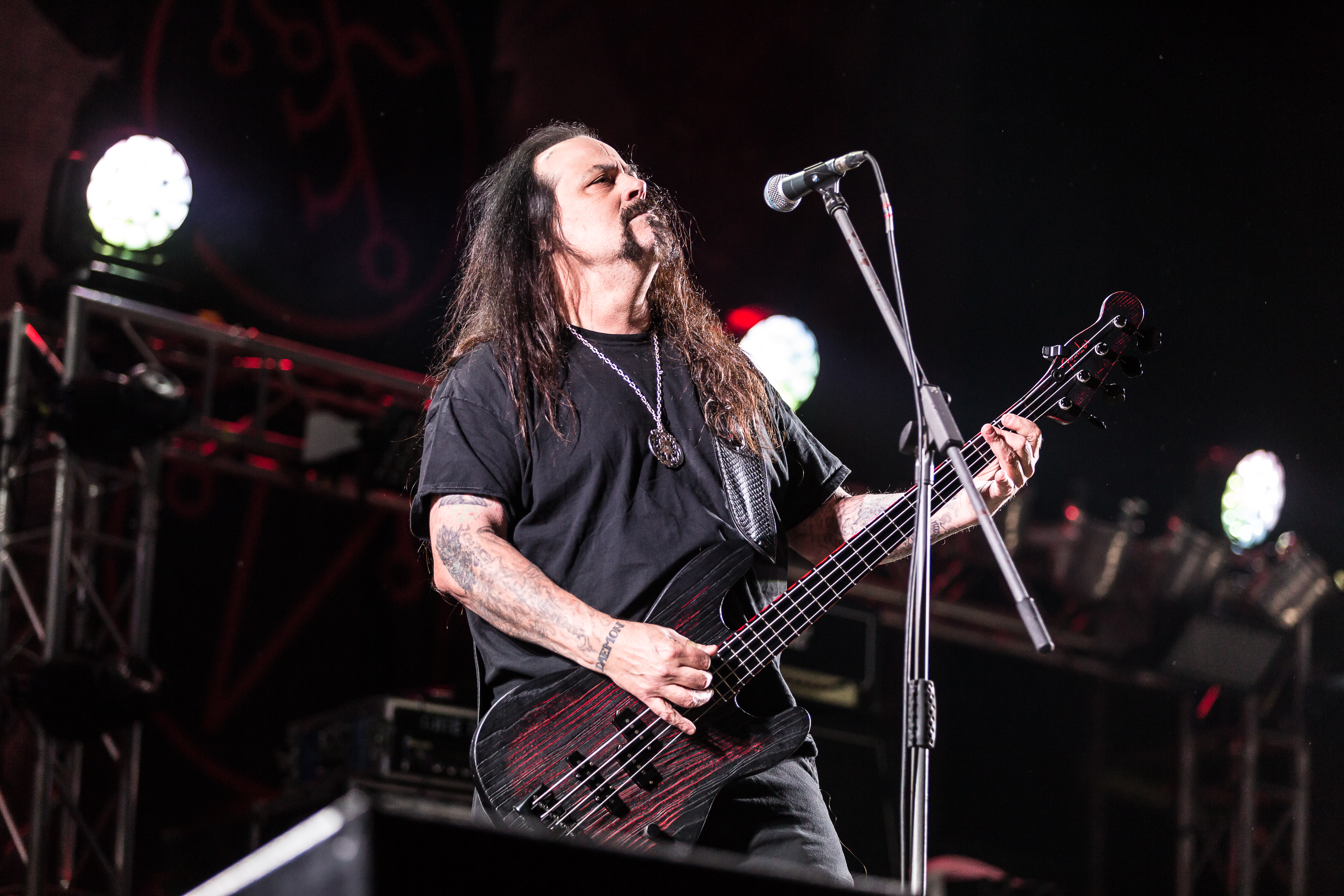
Benton performing with Deicide at the Party San Metal Open Air 2023 in Obermehler-Schlotheim/Germany

Although Benton has admitted to drug abuse, heavy drinking, and smoking during his younger years, he claims to have adopted a healthier lifestyle in his later years. He was quoted saying: "You know what? Who hasn't experimented with a few things in their life? Big deal. So what if I experimented? [...] Look, I don't even drink anymore. [...] I'll have a Heineken every once in a while, but I was drinking a bottle of Jack Daniel's every night before I went onstage and another bottle while I was playing. That starts catching up with you real quick, and I started going blind in my right eye. So after a nice scare at the doctor's office about four years ago, I stopped." On the topic of methamphetamine, he opined: "It’s just a disgusting, gross drug, and people who do it are normally gross themselves – junkies and shit. But that’s not my game anymore, man! I’m healthy living now." Benton has stated that he now maintains the habits of low-carb dieting and cycling to preserve his physical well-being.

Unlike many other former and current members of Deicide, Benton claims to have never been arrested or incarcerated in his lifetime. He said: "Let’s just say I was really fast on my feet. [laughs] We did messed-up shit, but I had my story down, so that when the cops asked me who did it I was like, ‘I don’t know’, and all my buddies who were with me when I did it said the same thing. If everyone sticks to their story, no one gets in trouble!"

Benton has married three times. His second marriage lasted only eight months. He stated: "It’s like stepping in a pile of dog shit: you see it on the ground and you know not to step in it, but you just go ahead and take your shoe and step all in."

Benton has two sons, Daemon Michael Benton and Vinnie Benton. He has an interest in motorcycles, which can be seen in the music videos for the Deicide songs "Scars of the Crucifix" and "Conviction".

Benton has expressed his desire to be cremated, citing concerns that his gravesite could be defecated or urinated on, and that his ashes be scattered in the ocean, citing concerns that his ashes could be snorted.

== Discography ==
With Deicide

- As Amon; Feasting the Beast demo (1987)
- As Amon; Sacrificial demo (1989)
- Deicide (1990)
- Legion (1992)
- Amon: Feasting the Beast compilation (1993)
- Once Upon the Cross (1995)
- Serpents of the Light (1997)
- When Satan Lives live album (1998)
- Insineratehymn (2000)
- In Torment in Hell (2001)
- The Best of Deicide compilation (2003)
- Scars of the Crucifix (2004)
- When London Burns DVD (2006)
- The Stench of Redemption (2006)
- Doomsday L.A. live EP/DVD (2007)
- Till Death Do Us Part (2008)
- To Hell with God (2011)
- In the Minds of Evil (2013)
- Overtures of Blasphemy (2018)
- Banished by Sin (2024)

With Vital Remains

- Dechristianize (2003)
- Icons of Evil (2007)

Guest appearances

- Cannibal Corpse, Eaten Back to Life (1990); backing vocals on "Mangled" and "A Skull Full of Maggots"
- Napalm Death, Harmony Corruption (1990); backing vocals on "Unfit Earth"
- Cancer, Death Shall Rise (1991); backing vocals on "Hung, Drawn and Quartered"
- Cannibal Corpse, Butchered at Birth (1991); backing vocals on "Vomit the Soul"
- Transmetal, Dante's Inferno (1993); backing vocals on "Dante's Inferno" and "Hymn for Him"
- Roadrunner United (2005); vocals on "Annihilation by the Hands of God"
- Roadrunner United Live Concert DVD (2008); vocals on Obituary's "The End Complete" and Deicide's "Dead By Dawn".
- Belphegor, Conjuring the Dead (2014); additional vocals on "Legions of Destruction"

== See also ==
- Florida death metal
- Satanic panic
