= Insineratehymn =

Studio album by Deicide
- Released: June 27, 2000
- Studio: Morrisound Recording, Tampa
- Genre: Death metal
- Length: 31:06
- Label: Roadrunner
- Producer: Deicide

Deicide chronology
When Satan Lives (1998)	Insineratehymn (2000)	In Torment in Hell (2001)

Professional ratings
Review scores
Source	Rating
AllMusic	4/5 stars
Chronicles of Chaos	2/10
Classic Rock	1/5 stars
Collector's Guide to Heavy Metal	1/10
Metal Hammer	8/10

Insineratehymn is the fifth studio album by American death metal band Deicide, released on June 27, 2000 through Roadrunner Records.

== Background and recording ==
The album was recorded at Morrisound Recording on a budget of $11,500. The song "The Gift That Keeps on Giving" is featured on The Sopranos episode "Pie-O-My".

== Musical style ==
The band's songwriting on this album exhibits songs with slower and more atmospheric grooves. The track "Bible Basher" is the only song that has become a staple in the band's live set. Rather than being about God, the song "Forever Hate You" is directed at Glen Benton's ex-wife.

== Track listing ==
All tracks are written by Glen Benton and Deicide (Steve Asheim).

No.	Title	Length
1.	"Bible Basher"	2:23
2.	"Forever Hate You"	3:08
3.	"Standing in the Flames"	3:32
4.	"Remnant of a Hopeless Path"	2:58
5.	"The Gift That Keeps on Giving"	3:02
6.	"Halls of Warship"	3:03
7.	"Suffer Again"	2:18
8.	"Worst Enemy"	2:47
9.	"Apocalyptic Fear"	3:21
10.	"Refusal of Penance"	4:34
Total length:		31:06

== Personnel ==
- Glen Benton – bass, vocals
- Eric Hoffman – guitars
- Brian Hoffman – guitars
- Steve Asheim – drums

=== Production ===
- Deicide – production
- Jim Morris – recording, engineering, mixing
