= The Stench of Redemption =

Studio album by Deicide
- Released: August 22, 2006
- Recorded: March–June 2006
- Studio: Morrisound Recording (Tampa)
- Genres: Death metal; blackened death metal
- Length: 41:12
- Label: Earache
- Producer: Steve Asheim

Deicide chronology
When London Burns (2006)	The Stench of Redemption (2006)	Doomsday L.A. (2007)

The Stench of Redemption is the eighth studio album by Florida death metal band Deicide. It is their first album to feature Jack Owen (formerly of Cannibal Corpse) and Ralph Santolla (formerly of Iced Earth) on guitars. Some editions of the album include a cover of "Black Night" by Deep Purple, with rewritten lyrics by Glen Benton.

The Stench of Redemption was Deicide's most successful release to date, peaking at No. 11 on the Top Heatseekers chart. Many critics praised The Stench of Redemption as a return to form for Deicide, despite the band losing Eric and Brian Hoffman.

== Composition and music ==
After mastering the album for the first time, the band decided they preferred the sound of the rough mixes, so the mastering process was redone to better capture the sound of the original mixes.

The album's music has been called "angry and brutal."

Lyrically, the album explores themes of destruction and anti-Christianity. The Stench of Redemption is the first Deicide album to have writing credits attributed to individual band members. While the album's riff-writing stays true to Deicide's traditional sound, Ralph Santolla and Jack Owen utilize a neo-classical style of lead guitar playing, a drastic departure from the atonal shred style employed by the Hoffman Brothers.

Drummer Steve Asheim said of the album, "I'd have to say 'Stench' is definitely my favorite and the one I'm most proud of, Benton too I think. It really all came together on this one, the material, the players, the sound, the vibe... It was a real pleasure doing this record with this line-up, almost effortless."

The album is said to contain elements of grindcore.

The album's guitar solos have been described as "melodic, arpeggiated outbursts." Glen Benton's vocals have been called "evil sounding" and "mostly indecipherable." The album makes use of multi-layered vocals, and Benton's high shrieks have drawn comparisons to black metal.

== Controversy ==
The music video for "Homage for Satan", which features blood-splattered zombies on a rampaging mission to capture a priest, was banned from UK music TV channel Scuzz.

== Reception ==
Professional ratings
Review scores
Source	Rating
About.com	4/5 stars
AllMusic	3.5/5 stars
Alternative Press	5/5
Blabbermouth.net	8/10
Brave Words & Bloody Knuckles	9.5/10
Chronicles of Chaos	9/10
Collector's Guide to Heavy Metal	10/10
Metal Storm	9.6/10
Rock Hard	8.5/10
Stylus	B+

The Stench of Redemption met with positive reviews, with most reviewers praising the added melodic dimension, which they attributed to the new guitarists. Chad Bowar, writing for About.com, praised the guitar team for "breath[ing] new life into Deicide's approach. You might not even notice because of all the blast beats and breakneck riffing, but there are some actual melodies here. They have added a subtle layer of complexity to the band's brutal arsenal, which makes the songs that much more powerful". Similarly, Scott Alisoglu wrote for Blabbermouth that the new guitarists "add to Deicide's legendary death metal sound by upping the six-string dynamics and giving these compositions a much-needed injection of compositional depth. That does not mean that you won't recognize The Stench of Redemption as anything but a Hell-fried Deicide album, only that the added ingredients push the album to heights previously unattained". Jackie Smit, writing for Chronicles of Chaos, claimed that the addition of Jack Owen and Ralph Santolla "lit [a fire] under the remaining original members' collective behinds" and added a melodic dimension "unlike anything the Hoffman brothers were ever able to muster". Referring to the album as "unapologetically melodic", Cosmo Lee wrote in Stylus Magazine that The Stench of Redemption is "no less brutal" for its melodic inclinations, and praised Steve Asheim's "massive, memorable" riffs and Benton's "diabolical" vocals.

== Track listing ==
All lyrics are written by Glen Benton; all music is composed by Steve Asheim.

No.	Title	Length
1.	"The Stench of Redemption"	4:09
2.	"Death to Jesus"	3:53
3.	"Desecration"	4:31
4.	"Crucified for the Innocence"	4:35
5.	"Walk with the Devil in Dreams You Behold"	4:58
6.	"Homage for Satan"	3:59
7.	"Not of This Earth"	3:19
8.	"Never to Be Seen Again"	3:24
9.	"The Lord's Sedition"	5:41
10.	"Black Night (Deep Purple cover)"	2:43
Total length:		41:12

== Personnel ==
- Glen Benton – bass, vocals, executive production
- Steve Asheim – drums
- Jack Owen – guitars
- Ralph Santolla – guitars

== Charts ==
Chart performance for The Stench of Redemption
Chart (2006)	Peak position
German Albums (Offizielle Top 100)	84
UK Rock & Metal Albums (OCC)	14
US Top Heatseekers Albums (Billboard)	11
US Top Independent Albums (Billboard)	21
