= Serpents of the Light =

Studio album by Deicide
- Released: October 21, 1997
- Recorded: 1997
- Studio: Morrisound Recording, Tampa
- Genre: Death metal
- Length: 30:38
- Label: Roadrunner
- Producer: Deicide, Scott Burns

Deicide chronology
Once upon the Cross (1995)	Serpents of the Light (1997)	When Satan Lives (1998)

Professional ratings
Review scores
Source	Rating
AllMusic	3/5 stars
Chronicles of Chaos	8/10
Classic Rock	3/5 stars
Kerrang!	3/5 stars

Serpents of the Light is the fourth studio album by American death metal band Deicide, released on October 21, 1997 by Roadrunner Records.

Glen Benton stated that "Serpents of the Light" was written "about a friend of mine that died".

== Track listing ==
All tracks are written by Glen Benton and Deicide (Steve Asheim).

No.	Title	Length
1.	"Serpents of the Light"	3:03
2.	"Bastard of Christ"	2:48
3.	"Blame It on God"	2:45
4.	"This Is Hell We're In"	2:51
5.	"I Am No One"	3:38
6.	"Slave to the Cross"	3:15
7.	"Creatures of Habit"	3:07
8.	"Believe the Lie"	2:50
9.	"The Truth Above"	2:45
10.	"Father Baker's"	3:36
Total length:		30:38

== Personnel ==
- Glen Benton – bass, vocals
- Eric Hoffman – guitars
- Brian Hoffman – guitars
- Steve Asheim – drums

Production

- Deicide – production
- Scott Burns – production
- Nizin Lopez – cover art
