= Jack Owen =

American guitarist

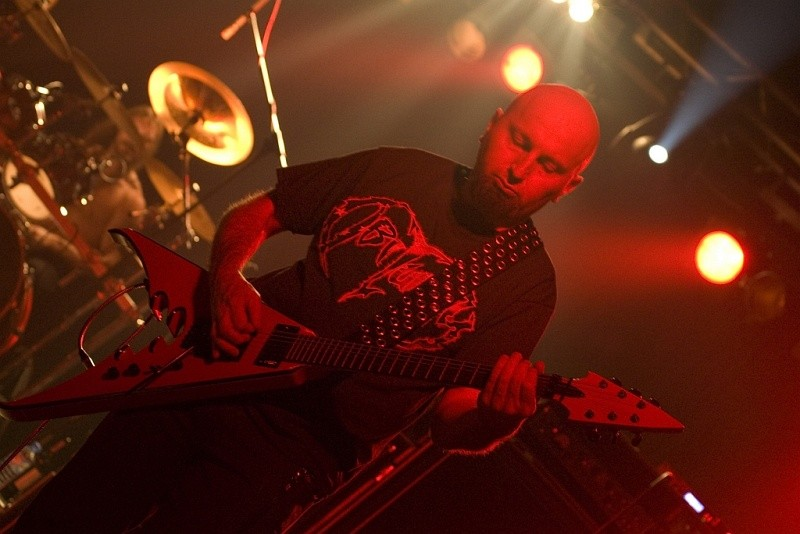
- Owen in 2009

Background information
- Also known as: Oystercatchers; Jacko
- Born: December 6, 1967 (age 58); Akron, New York, U.S.
- Genres: Heavy metal; death metal; thrash metal; symphonic black metal
- Occupation: Musician
- Instrument: Guitar
- Years active: 1987–present
- Label: Century Media
- Member of: Six Feet Under
- Formerly of: Cannibal Corpse; Deicide; Order of Ennead

Jack Owen (born December 6, 1967) is an American musician and guitarist of the death metal band Six Feet Under. He was one of the founding members of Cannibal Corpse. He also had a stint with Deicide—another influential and long-running Florida death metal band—with whom he recorded four albums. In 2007, Owen played shows with Adrift before joining Order of Ennead at times when their guitarist, John Li, was unavailable.

== Musical career ==
Owen recalls a cassette dub of Kiss' album Alive is what initially got him into heavy metal music and playing guitar. He experimented on his father's acoustic guitar before ultimately purchasing his own.

Owen was originally in a band called Beyond Death with Alex Webster and Darrin Pfeiffer from Goldfinger before forming Cannibal Corpse. They started off playing Metallica and Beastie Boys covers. He stayed with the band from their formation in 1988 until 2004, when he left because the band had begun feeling like an "old job" to him, and because he wanted to move on. He is quoted saying, "[my] heart just wasn't in it anymore, and it was reflected in my appearance on stage. Times change, and I just don't enjoy the music as much as I used to, and the only thing keeping me in the band was steady work, and the pay [...] These things makes it unfair to myself, my band members, and especially the fans."

Owen joined Deicide in 2004. His first release with the band was 2006's The Stench of Redemption. Owen left Deicide in 2016. He claims it stemmed from a dispute over writing credit with Deicide bassist/vocalist Glen Benton and drummer Steve Asheim. "It was a problem with new stuff I was writing. I walked into practice and Steve had re-recorded it and changed notes here and there for three or four songs that I had. It was stupid at the time. But he's, like, 'Hey, I changed the notes so I get writing credit.' And I'm, like, 'That's not how the songs go, though.' And Glen's like, 'It is now.' [Laughs] So I literally walked out and ghosted them. [Laughs] Later on, it was like, 'Hey, dude, you're out.'" Benton has since affirmed that the band has “no hard feelings” towards Owen.

Following his departure from Deicide, he joined Six Feet Under, a band formed by then Cannibal Corpse bandmate Chris Barnes in 1993. Owen's addition was announced in February 2017.

== Guitar playing style ==
In an interview, Owen self-described his compositional style with Cannibal Corpse as "straight forward" and "not too technical." Producer Scott Burns described Owen's style as "more blues-based." In addition to extreme metal, Owen also possesses folk guitar and vocal skills, as seen in The Making of the Wretched Spawn.

== Discography ==
=== Adrift ===
- Absolution (2007)

=== Attack ===
- Fade Away 2009

=== Cannibal Corpse ===
- Eaten Back to Life (1990)
- Butchered at Birth (1991)
- Tomb of the Mutilated (1992)
- Hammer Smashed Face (1993)
- The Bleeding (1994)
- Vile (1996)
- Gallery of Suicide (1998)
- Bloodthirst (1999)
- Live Cannibalism (2000)
- Gore Obsessed (2002)
- Worm Infested (2003)
- The Wretched Spawn (2004)

=== Deicide ===
- The Stench of Redemption (2006)
- Till Death Do Us Part (2008)
- To Hell with God (2011)
- In the Minds of Evil (2013)

=== Estuary ===
- Played bass live in 2007 on European tour.

=== Eyewitness ===
- Messiah Complex (1996)

=== Grave Descent ===
- Grave Descent MCD 2011

=== Six Feet Under ===
- Nightmares of the Decomposed (2020)
- Killing for Revenge (2024)
- Next to Die (2026)

=== Tennessee Murder Club ===
- Sessions, "The Pact" 2013 Full Length Release

== See also ==
- Florida death metal
