= Scars of the Crucifix =

Studio album by Deicide
- Released: February 23, 2004
- Recorded: July 2003 – January 2004
- Studio: Morrisound Recording, Tampa
- Genre: Death metal
- Length: 29:32
- Label: Earache
- Producer: Neil Kernon

Deicide chronology
The Best of Deicide (2003)	Scars of the Crucifix (2004)	When London Burns (2006)

Alternative cover
- LP cover

Professional ratings
Review scores
Source	Rating
Allmusic	2.5/5 stars
Chronicles of Chaos	8.5/10
Collector's Guide to Heavy Metal	7/10
KNAC	4.5/5 stars

Scars of the Crucifix is the seventh studio album by American death metal band Deicide and their first on Earache Records, released on February 23, 2004. The album is the final release to feature the band's full original lineup, as the Hoffman brothers would depart shortly after this album, ending their 17-year tenure with the group.

== Background ==
Glen Benton recorded his vocal tracks on the album one line at a time.

The track "Scars of the Crucifix" spawned Deicide's first ever music video, filmed in Nottingham. The closing track, "The Pentecostal", is followed by a hidden untitled bonus track with drummer/composer Steve Asheim playing a classical piano solo. The song "Fuck Your God" was part of a playlist used as a method of torture on Iraqi detainees by being piped into their bunks to induce sleep deprivation.

On July 11, 2006, Brave Words & Bloody Knuckles reported that Deicide received a Silver Disc from the independent music trade body Impala for their sales in Europe.

== Reception ==
Todd Kristel of Allmusic said of Deicide:

They mostly just spew vitriol at the same general target they've been attacking for over a decade [...] for what it's worth, they still seem to take their religion shtick seriously. Depending on your perspective, that makes them sincere, offensive, provocative, simpleminded, unintentionally humorous, or good showmen.

== Track listing ==
All tracks are written by Glen Benton and Deicide (Steve Asheim).

No.	Title	Length
1.	"Scars of the Crucifix"	3:08
2.	"Mad at God"	3:05
3.	"Conquered by Sodom"	2:58
4.	"Fuck Your God"	3:32
5.	"When Heaven Burns"	4:08
6.	"Enchanted Nightmare"	2:12
7.	"From Darkness Come"	2:58
8.	"Go Now Your Lord Is Dead"	1:55
9.	"The Pentecostal" (ends at 2:46; hidden track begins at 2:49)	5:36
Total length:		29:32

== Personnel ==
- Glen Benton – bass, vocals
- Eric Hoffman – guitars
- Brian Hoffman – guitars
- Steve Asheim – drums, piano (at end of "The Pentecostal")
- Neil Kernon – production
