= Gear Gods =

Online publication

- Company type: Private
- Website type: Music publication
- Available in: English
- Founded: 2013
- Area served: Worldwide
- Key people: Trey Xavier
- Website: geargods.net
- Advertising: Blast Beat Network
- Launched: 2013
- Current status: Active

Gear Gods is an online publication centered on music production, equipment and theory in heavy metal and hard rock. It is associated with the websites MetalSucks and Metal Injection. Gear Gods has featured in-depth interviews on the equipments of Between the Buried and Me, John Petrucci, Zakk Wylde, Mike Portnoy, Misha Mansoor, among other artists.

Its editor-in-chief is Trey Xavier, a guitar instructor who studied at Berklee College of Music and Sonoma State University. Xavier articles have been featured in Grammy.com, Guitar World and Ultimate Guitar.

On January 22, 2014, Gear Gods broadcast Metal Masters 5, a clinic featuring members of Pantera, Megadeth, Slayer and Anthrax.

In February 2014, the publication and CreativeLive co-hosted a course in production by Kurt Ballou.

On June 11, 2014, Gear Gods hosted a live video seminar on music equipment with members of Periphery, All Shall Perish, Intervals and Obscura.
