= Once upon the Cross =

Studio album by Deicide
- Released: April 18, 1995
- Recorded: 1994
- Studio: Morrisound Recording, Tampa
- Genre: Death metal
- Length: 28:10
- Label: Roadrunner
- Producer: Deicide, Scott Burns

Deicide chronology
Amon: Feasting the Beast (1993)	Once upon the Cross (1995)	Serpents of the Light (1997)

Once upon the Cross is the third studio album by American death metal band Deicide, released on April 18, 1995 by Roadrunner Records.

The samples at the beginning of the opening track "Once upon the Cross" and "Trick or Betrayed" are taken from the film The Last Temptation of Christ.

== Background and recording ==
Drummer Steve Asheim said of Once upon the Cross, "Listening back, '...Cross' seems very slow. Live we play those songs much faster. Actually we've always played them faster than they are on the record. When we went in the studio in '94 and I recorded the drum tracks at the speed I had been playing them at practice, we only had 22 minutes with the same amount of songs, they were just faster. 22 minutes does not make an album so I re-recorded the songs at a more controlled pace and still only ended up with 30 minutes. So there it was." Asheim later affirmed that the original tracks of the album had been lost to history; he stated that due to budgetary restraints, the band simply slowed down the original tape the album had been tracked on, and re-tracked over it.

== Music ==
In a 1995 interview, Deicide bassist-vocalist Glen Benton said, "I think people are taking [the band] more serious[ly], and they're getting scared in that. You know, [the heaviness is] not going away. You know, it's one of the kind of things where [they'll] think 'well, maybe the next record they're gonna fuckin start softening.' I tell everybody man, the only things that get soft are butter and shit, man. We're not getting soft."

== Reception ==
Professional ratings
Review scores
Source	Rating
AllMusic	4/5 stars
Classic Rock	4/5 stars
Guitar World	2 stars
Kerrang!	5/5 stars
NME	3/10

David Jehnzen of Allmusic noted the band's growth, and complimented the Hoffman brothers' "guitar pyrotechnics".

== Track listing ==
All lyrics are written by Glen Benton; all music is composed by Deicide (Steve Asheim).

No.	Title	Length
1.	"Once upon the Cross"	3:34
2.	"Christ Denied"	3:38
3.	"When Satan Rules His World"	2:53
4.	"Kill the Christian"	2:57
5.	"Trick or Betrayed"	2:25
6.	"They Are the Children of the Underworld"	3:09
7.	"Behind the Light Thou Shall Rise"	2:59
8.	"To Be Dead"	2:39
9.	"Confessional Rape"	3:56
Total length:		28:10

== Personnel ==
- Glen Benton – bass, vocals
- Eric Hoffman – guitars
- Brian Hoffman – guitars
- Steve Asheim – drums
- Deicide – production
- Scott Burns – production
