= Deicide (album) =

Studio album by Deicide
- Released: June 26, 1990
- Recorded: March 1990
- Studios: Morrisound Recording, Tampa, Florida
- Genre: Death metal
- Length: 33:35
- Label: R/C
- Producers: Deicide, Scott Burns

Deicide chronology
Deicide (1990)	Legion (1992)

Deicide is the debut studio album by American death metal band Deicide, released on June 26, 1990 by R/C Records. The album contains all of their demo tracks, plus the songs "Deicide" and "Mephistopheles".

The album was recorded at Morrisound Studios in Tampa, Florida by Scott Burns.

The vocals on the album has been described as sounding "absolutely hideous and tortured" and "pure evil." The album's lyrics explore themes relating to Satanism and blasphemy.

Deicide is considered by many to be a classic album in the death metal genre. Publications generally note the memorability of the album's riffs.

== Background and recording ==
The album was recorded in the "B room" at Morrisound Studios in Tampa, Florida, where Deicide would record most of their subsequent works. Frontman Glen Benton has expressed dissatisfaction with the album's production quality, which he attributed to budgetary restrictions at the time.

According to Benton, he originally composed the album's fourth track "Dead by Dawn" on an acoustic guitar while watching The Beverly Hillbillies.

== Music and lyrics ==
The music on Deicide is characterized by its "genuine, realistic rage" and "irrepressible anger." Music journalist T Coles said "[the album] sounds like a journey into hell, as demons claw at your feeble limbs on your descent." The album has been said to contain elements of grindcore and speed metal. Coles noted the album is "an example of how death metal refined the nasty edge of grindcore but retained a sinister sound."

The tracks on Deicide have been referred to as "evil anthems" with lyrics described as "Satanic nonsense." While containing mostly Satanism or blasphemous lyrical themes, "Lunatic of God's Creation" and "Carnage in the Temple of the Damned" concern Charles Manson and Jim Jones respectively. Chris Krovatin of Kerrang! said the album "sounds believably dedicated to dying for the Devil." Ultimate-Guitar said the album's lyrics are "fueled by [Benton's] deep hatred for organized religion." The lyrics in "Dead by Dawn" reference the Necronomicon.

The album's musicianship has been described as "shockingly tight," and has been noted for its "turbulent" rhythmic textures. As is common by the genre's conventions, the album employs double-bass blastbeat drumwork. Glen Benton's vocals on the album have been called "absolutely hideous and tortured" and "pure evil." He has erroneously claimed that no effects were used on his vocals while recording the album, despite pitch-shifted editing on several tracks.

== Reception and legacy ==
Professional ratings
Review scores
Source	Rating
AllMusic	4.5/5 stars
Classic Rock	5/5 stars
Entertainment Weekly	A
Kerrang!	(1990) (2011)

Deicide is considered a classic in the death metal genre, and is sometimes considered to be the best-selling death metal album of all time. Nielsen SoundScan lists it second to Morbid Angel's Covenant up until 2003; however, Deicide was released before SoundScan went into effect, so the SoundScan figure lacks pre-Soundscan sales. Chris Krovatin of Kerrang! said, "Though Deicide's later albums cemented their sound into what we now consider brutal death metal, it was the unhinged satanic rancor of their debut that made them a force to be reckoned with."

Bradley Torreano from AllMusic believed Deicide's guitar riffs were creative and memorable, and said that the album "struck a chord that would, for good or bad, instantly inspire legions of like-minded groups." Reviewing the album for Classic Rock in 2000, Darren Sadler stated that the album "is still the quartet's finest hour".

In 2024, readers of Metal Injection voted the album the fifth best debut from a classic North American death metal act.

Theron Moore of New Noise Magazine called the album "perfection in blasphemy."

=== "Sacrificial Suicide" controversy ===
In the album's second track, "Sacrificial Suicide", Glen Benton was alleged to have claimed that in order to achieve a life opposite to that of Jesus, he planned to commit suicide at age 33. This claim continued throughout the 1990s. However, he passed that age in 2000 and did not kill himself. In 2006, he stated that these statements had been "asinine remarks" and that "only cowards and losers" choose to kill themselves.

== Track listing ==
All songs written by Deicide (Glen Benton, Steve Asheim, Eric Hoffman & Brian Hoffman).

No.	Title	Length
1.	"Lunatic of God's Creation"	2:42
2.	"Sacrificial Suicide"	2:51
3.	"Oblivious to Evil"	2:41
4.	"Dead by Dawn"	3:56
5.	"Blaspherereion"	4:15
6.	"Deicide"	4:02
7.	"Carnage in the Temple of the Damned"	3:33
8.	"Mephistopheles"	3:35
9.	"Day of Darkness"	2:05
10.	"Crucifixation"	3:55
Total length:		33:35

== Personnel ==
- Glen Benton – vocals, bass
- Eric Hoffman – guitars
- Brian Hoffman – guitars
- Steve Asheim – drums
- Deicide – production
- Scott Burns – production
