= Legion (Deicide album) =

Studio album by Deicide
- Released: June 9, 1992
- Recorded: 1992
- Studios: Morrisound Recording, Tampa
- Genre: Death metal
- Length: 29:01
- Label: R/C
- Producers: Deicide, Scott Burns

Deicide chronology
Deicide (1990)	Legion (1992)	Amon: Feasting the Beast (1993)

Legion is the second studio album by American death metal band Deicide, released on June 9, 1992, by R/C Records.

The album was recorded at Morrisound Studios in Tampa, Florida by Scott Burns. Deicide frontman Glen Benton claims to have created the album's artwork.

The album's music is considered to be extremely technical, and is played at much higher tempos than its predecessor, Deicide. The band stopped playing many of the album's songs during live performances for a period of time. Drummer Steve Asheim would ultimately blame the band's inability to play the songs on former guitarists Eric and Brian Hoffman. The album's material has since been reintegrated into the band's live set following lineup changes.

Legion has been positively received since its release by modern publications. Benton stated that although the album was initially met with repudiation from the music press upon its release, it is now beloved by "everybody".

== Background and recording ==
The album was recorded at Morrisound Studios in Tampa, Florida by Scott Burns.

According to Joe DiVita of Loudwire, a rumor exists that the album had to be retracked due to its extremely high tempos, causing it to be too short.

== Music and lyrics ==
Kelly Simms of Invisible Oranges stated that on Legion, Deicide deviated from the "extreme elements" that were abundant on their debut album and pursued a "more straightforward brutal aesthetic." The album's production is said to be "sharper and thicker" than its predecessor. Frontman Glen Benton believes the album was "ahead of its time" and that the album's high tempos "caught everybody off-guard," self-describing the album's sound as "fuckin over the top."

Legion is one of Deicide's most musically ambitious releases, and is considered to be more technical than its predecessor. It has also been noted for containing more blast beats than its predecessor. Joe DiVita of Loudwire called the album "29 minutes of sheer technical chaos." Unlike Deicide's first album, no pitch shifters or harmonizers were used on Benton's vocals. However, delay, reverb, and multi-tracking were among the studio manipulations used to achieve the vocal effects on the album.

The album's guitar riffs utilize excessive tremolo picking and palm muting, and have been described as "sinister" and "chunky" – as well as "hooky" and "catchy." According Zeke Ferrington of Gear Gods, "the scratchy distortion hides all the killer riffing behind a veil of obnoxious, high frequencies. All that you're really left with are chugging rhythms with no discernible pitch." Additionally, the album's guitar solos have been described as "chaotic." Benton's basslines follow the guitar parts of the Hoffmans.

The first track, "Satan Spawn, the Caco-Daemon", features a backward message. At about twenty seconds, a voice can be heard repeating the song's title.

The second track "Dead but Dreaming" is known for its abrupt tempo changes. Invisible Oranges stated that the song's instrumentation employs "hooky riffs and galloping double kick drum patterns." It is considered by some publications to be among Deicide's greatest songs. Noisecreep stated that the band's "signature songwriting formula of velocity, schizophrenic vocal lines and memorable chorus refrains has never let them down, and this track is no exception. By their second record, these guys already sounded like tried-and-true veterans." At one point, the band stopped playing songs from Legion live, with "Dead but Dreaming" being the only track remaining in the setlist during this time.

== Artwork ==
Deicide frontman Glen Benton claims to have designed the album's cover artwork. He said, "when I did the Legion album cover, computers were still fucking new. Nobody knew anything about three-dimensional artwork or any shit like that. And I was the first person to even fucking fuck with that."

== Live performances ==
Though the album remains a fan favorite, the band eventually stopped playing material from the album during live sets, save for "Dead But Dreaming". When the Hoffman brothers quit the band, Eric Hoffman stated that one of the main reasons was Glen Benton refusing to play longer sets and being unable to perform the technical bass guitar riffing required for Legion's material. In the 2010s, the band eventually began incorporating more of the album's songs back into their setlist.

By Steve Asheim's account, the Hoffmans themselves struggled to play the album's material, and would make excuses for why it could not be performed. He told Hells Headbangers co-founder Justin Horval in 2024: "Whenever we tried playing those songs, it was a trainwreck. So it took for this long of time to pass to get some competent players in, who can actually for one thing, listen to the riffs and hear what is going on, secondly, get a tone to actually represent the record and play it correctly, and third, present it and get the band tight with that material again. You know, it took about six months of going through the material. [...] I don't know, people thought it was our fault, but clearly it wasn't, because we're pulling that shit off now and people are digging it saying it sounds good. So the proof is kind of right there on where the problem lied."

== Reception and legacy ==
Professional ratings
Review scores
Source	Rating
AllMusic	3/5 stars
Kerrang!	4/5 stars
Metal Storm	8.0/10

Metal Storm said Legion is "in general a good album, some songs are well executed and with complex musical writing, but there are others that are just very simple and repetitive".

Vincent Jeffries of AllMusic stated, "Legion stands out as a musically complex but familiar offering from the band. Live favorite 'Trifixion' is indeed one of the better cuts from the release, but it's easier to consider this disc (and most records like it) as a whole. Deicide's compositions and performances are solid and serious throughout". He also suggested, "newer death metal fans will do well to start off their collection with Legion".

In 2022, Kelley Simms of Invisible Oranges wrote: "If their debut album was a game changer, then Legion did everything to top it. The songwriting was more cohesive and the musicianship really improved from its debut album. The band were at their tightest on Legion, as the tracks sound energetic, razor sharp, and scathing, while Asheim is a beast behind the kit. The legacy of Legion will live on as being one of the most evil, most brutal and most cohesive death metal albums ever created."

Benton has commented on the record's positive retrospective reception, stating "Everybody fuckin' hated it, all the magazines hated it; now it's years later and everybody loves it."

== Track listing ==
All songs written by Deicide (Glen Benton and Steve Asheim).

No.	Title	Length
1.	"Satan Spawn, the Caco-Daemon"	4:26
2.	"Dead but Dreaming"	3:13
3.	"Repent to Die"	3:59
4.	"Trifixion"	2:57
5.	"Behead the Prophet (No Lord Shall Live)"	3:44
6.	"Holy Deception"	3:19
7.	"In Hell I Burn"	4:36
8.	"Revocate the Agitator"	2:47
Total length:		29:01

== Personnel ==
- Glen Benton – bass, vocals
- Eric Hoffman – guitars
- Brian Hoffman – guitars
- Steve Asheim – drums
- Deicide – production
- Scott Burns – production, mixing
