= Deicide (band) =

American death metal band

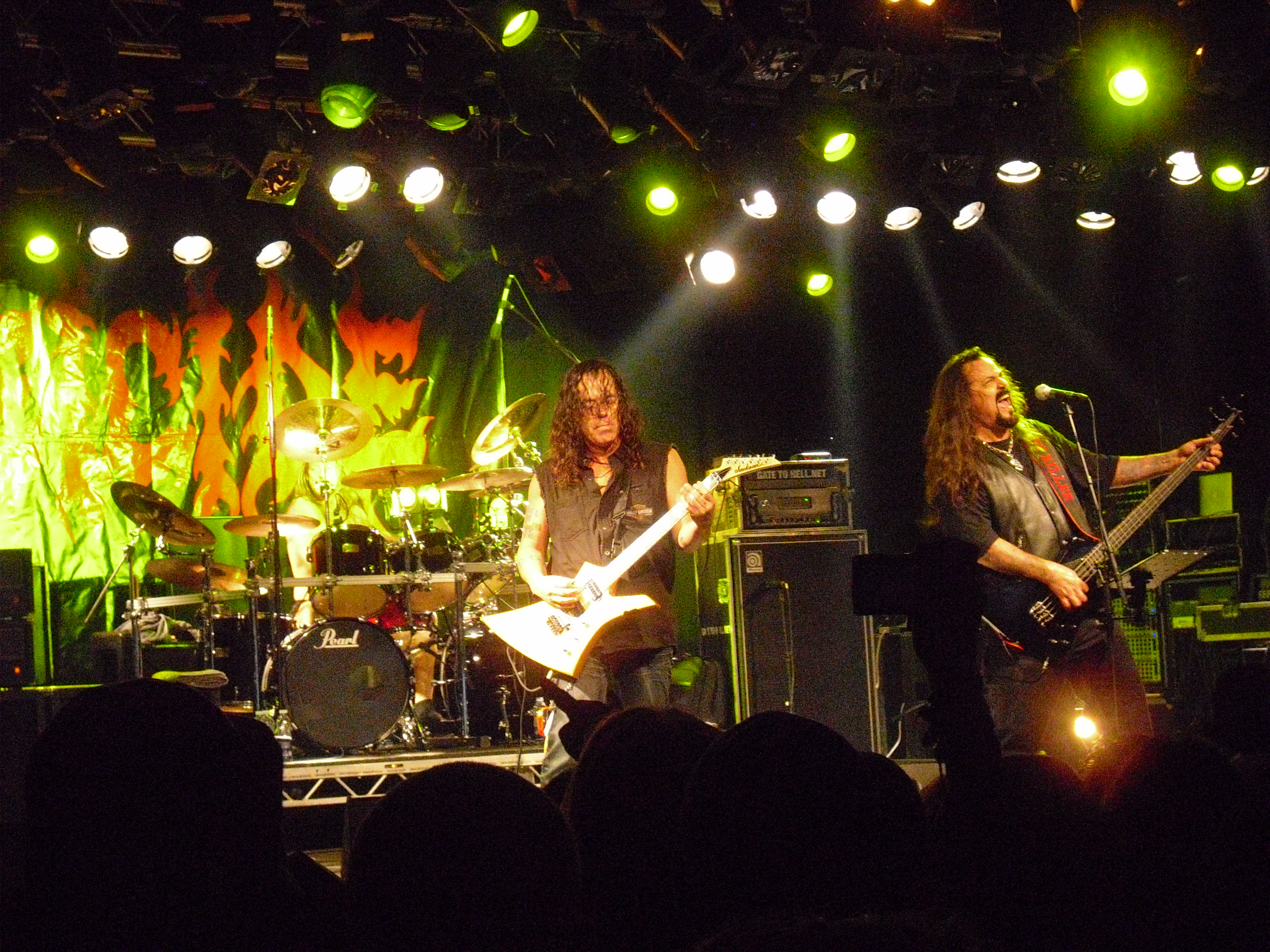
- Deicide performing at Metaltown Festival 2011

Background information
- Also known as: Carnage (1987); Amon (1987–1989)
- Origin: Tampa, Florida, U.S.
- Genre: Death metal
- Works: Deicide discography
- Years active: 1987–present
- Labels: R/C; Roadrunner; Earache; Century Media; Reigning Phoenix
- Spinoffs: Vital Remains, Amon
- Members: Glen Benton; Steve Asheim; Taylor Nordberg; Jadran "Conan" Gonzalez
- Past members: Eric Hoffman; Brian Hoffman; Ralph Santolla; Jack Owen; Mark English; Chris Cannella; Kevin Quirion
- Website: deicideofficial.com

Deicide is an American death metal band from Tampa, Florida. They formed in 1987 with drummer Steve Asheim and guitarist brothers Eric and Brian Hoffman as Carnage, then hired bassist and vocalist Glen Benton and became Amon. They renamed to Deicide in 1989. The band rose to mainstream success in 1992 with their second album, Legion, and is credited as the second-best-selling death metal band of the Soundscan Era, after Cannibal Corpse.

Since their debut album in 1990, Deicide has released thirteen studio albums, one live album, two compilation albums and two live DVDs. In November 2003, their first two albums, Deicide and Legion, were ranked second and third place respectively in best-selling death metal albums of the SoundScan era.

Deicide has been called "Florida's most notorious and despised death metal export." The band's first three studio albums, Deicide, Legion and Once Upon the Cross, are considered death metal classics. Deicide is notorious for its lyrics, which cover topics such as Satanism, anti-Christianity and blasphemy. The band's lyrics and the band members' personal lives have resulted in bans, lawsuits, criticism, and controversy from religious groups, political groups, animal rights activists, and the general public. Many band members have been arrested for various reasons.

== History ==
=== Formation and early years (1987–1989) ===
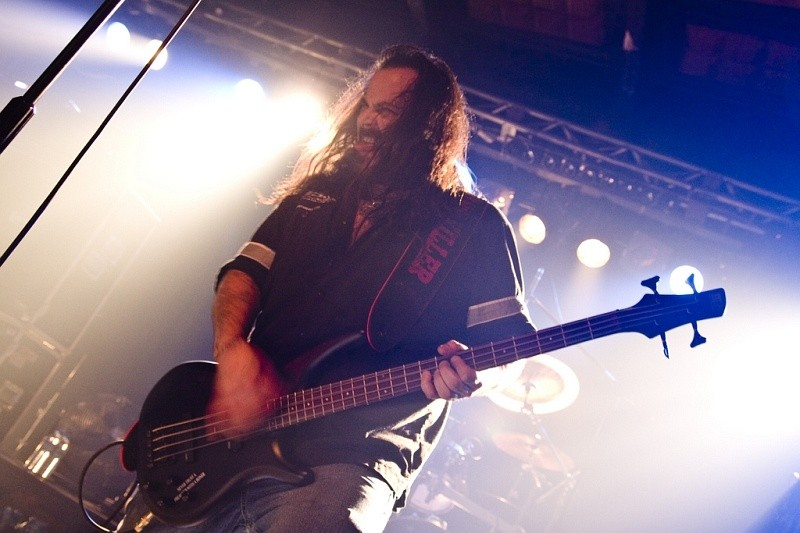
Bassist and vocalist Glen Benton is one of the two constant members of Deicide.

Original guitarists Brian and Eric Hoffman met drummer Steve Asheim in high school. During this time, Asheim moved his drum kit into Eric's bedroom. They would skip school, and as soon as the Hoffmans' parents left the house for work, they would sneak back in and practice Slayer, Sodom and Destruction covers.

Deicide was officially formed in Tampa, Florida on July 21, 1987, after Brian Hoffman called Glen Benton, replying to an advertisement the latter had placed in a local music magazine. The original bassist, named Ron, was dismissed for not showing up for practice. Hoffman and his brother, along with drummer Steve Asheim, had played together as the band "Carnage", which needed a bassist and vocalist. Carnage played cover songs by Slayer, Exodus, Celtic Frost and Dark Angel. Within a month, they had recorded the Feasting the Beast 8-track demo in Benton's garage and had started playing the occasional show in the Tampa area. In 1989, Carnage recorded their second demo, Sacrificial, at Morrisound with producer Scott Burns.

Malevolent Creation guitarist Phil Fasciana recalls an early Carnage show being "like Slayer intensified a thousand times", remembering that they threw a mannequin filled with guts from a butcher shop on the floor. Morbid Angel had pit bulls with them that were ripping the meat. The Hoffman brothers said that they would let the animal viscera sit in the sun all day prior to its use in their stage theatrics.

=== Roadrunner Records releases (1989–2004) ===
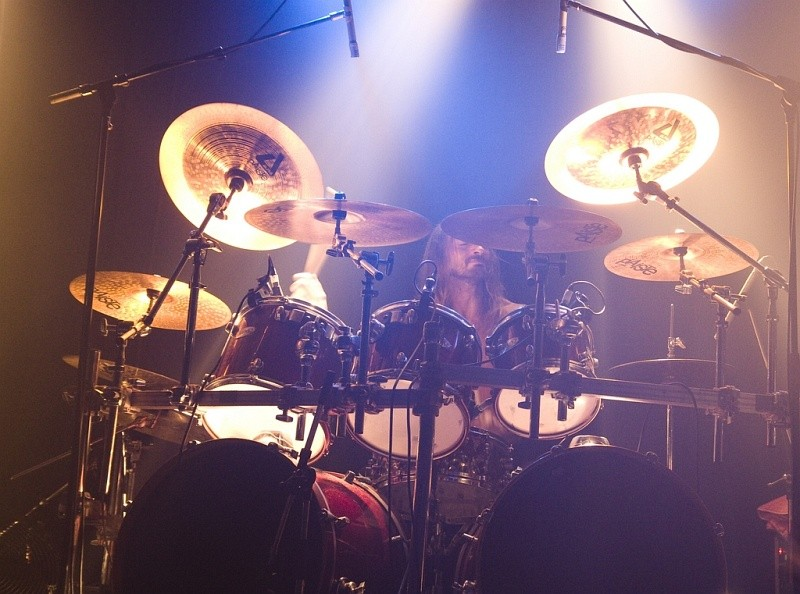
Drummer Steve Asheim is one of the two constant members of Deicide.

While still under the name Carnage, Benton reportedly stormed into Roadrunner Records' A&R man Monte Conner's office and slammed the demo down on his desk, belting out "sign us, you fucking asshole!" The next day contracts were issued to the band. Benton later partially denied this version of events. He claimed he visited the office but never used profanities. In 1989, the band's name was changed to Deicide at Roadrunner Records' request, due to multiple other bands already using "Carnage" as a band name.

Deicide released their self-titled debut album, produced by Scott Burns at Morrisound, in 1990. Their debut featured re-recorded versions of all six of the Sacrificial tunes that had secured them a record deal. The band did not tour on the album because Benton felt the band was worth more than the sums promoters were offering.

Deicide's second full-length album, Legion, was released on June 9, 1992.

In 1992, Deicide toured Europe with Atrocity from Germany and Gorefest, a Dutch death metal band. In Stockholm, during the Gorefest set, a bomb was discovered on-stage. It exploded in the club where they were playing. The bomb was to the rear of the stage, behind a heavy, fireproof door. The explosion was big enough to deform the door and blow it off its hinges. Deicide played three songs before the police stopped the concert and evacuated the club. At first, Benton blamed that attack on the Norwegian black metal scene, where some despised Deicide's brand of death metal. Many people blamed animal rights activists who were angered at Deicide's lyrics of animal sacrifice.

Deicide's third studio album, Once upon the Cross, was released in 1995. Benton shut down expectations that they would be getting less heavy over time, saying, "I tell everybody man, the only things that get soft are butter and shit, man. We're not getting soft."

The band's fourth studio album, Serpents of the Light, was released on October 21, 1997.

The band's first live album, When Satan Lives, was released on October 20, 1998.

The band's fifth studio album, Insineratehymn, was released on June 27, 2000.

Deicide left Roadrunner Records after its sixth studio album, In Torment in Hell, released on July 31, 2001. Benton recalled that Roadrunner Records treated him and Asheim well but hated the other two members. He recounted that they lent him money when he needed it, such as with his first divorce, as well as his tonsillectomy around the time of their first album.

In 2003, authorities detained Asheim and the Hoffmans at the Canadian border due to a misunderstanding, which caused the cancellation of the planned concert in Detroit. Media reports indicated that they were incarcerated on drug and weapons charges, but according to Earache Records, they were held overnight with no charges.

=== Departures of Eric and Brian Hoffman and middle era (2004) ===
Eric and Brian Hoffman made their final studio appearance with Deicide on 2004's Scars of the Crucifix, the band's first release on Earache Records. On November 25, 2004, the brothers departed the band due to animosity relating to royalties and publishing. Asheim stated that by this point, he had lost business trust in them, and that leading up to their departure, they could not be relied upon to show up for live performances. A spokesperson from Earache Records stated in a 2006 Blogspot post that the Hoffmans quit while the band was on tour. The spokesperson stated that the band members maintained a correspondence through "legal letters" until it was proven in a court of law that the Hoffmans composed far less material for Scars than they had claimed in their complaint. Earache remained neutral during the dispute. The Hoffman brothers went on to reform Amon. Benton opined that Deicide was stronger without the brothers, claiming they "rode on [his] and Steve's coattails for years."

Shortly after the Hoffmans' departure, former Cannibal Corpse guitarist Jack Owen, and Vital Remains guitarist Dave Suzuki filled the guitar roles. Following the tour, Suzuki was replaced with guitarist Ralph Santolla. Santolla stated he was a Catholic, which had received a small amount of shock and ridicule from some metal fans. In spite of this, Deicide's eighth studio album, The Stench of Redemption, released on August 22, 2006, received positive reviews from critics, who praised the album's guitar work and emphasis on melody.

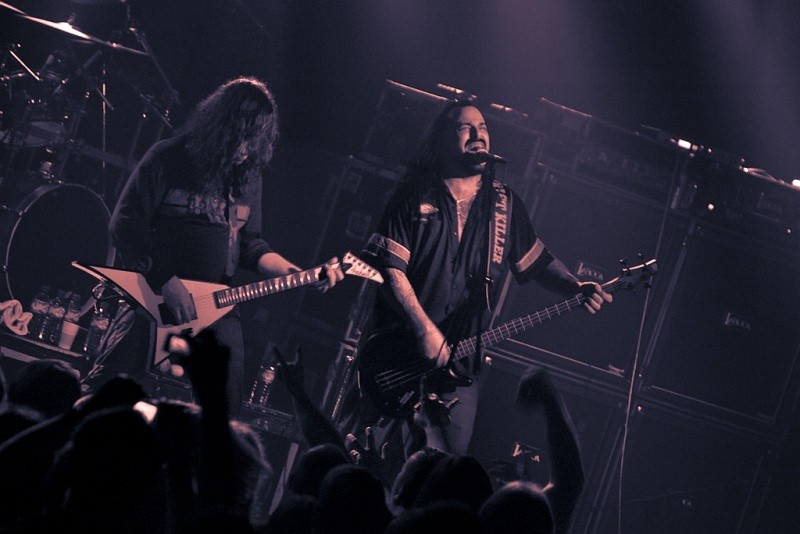
Ralph Santolla and Glen Benton performing at Winterfest in Warszawa in 2009

Benton said, "Jack brought stability, a calm, a stress-free environment for me" after the Hoffmans left. Benton was ready to quit and had started Vital Remains because of them, and he felt that Santolla would not be permanent from the start "because he's just a fucking mess of a human being." On the other hand, he felt that the band was a family with Owen, and he did not want to treat members like hired guns since he did not feel he was better or deserved more pay than anyone else.

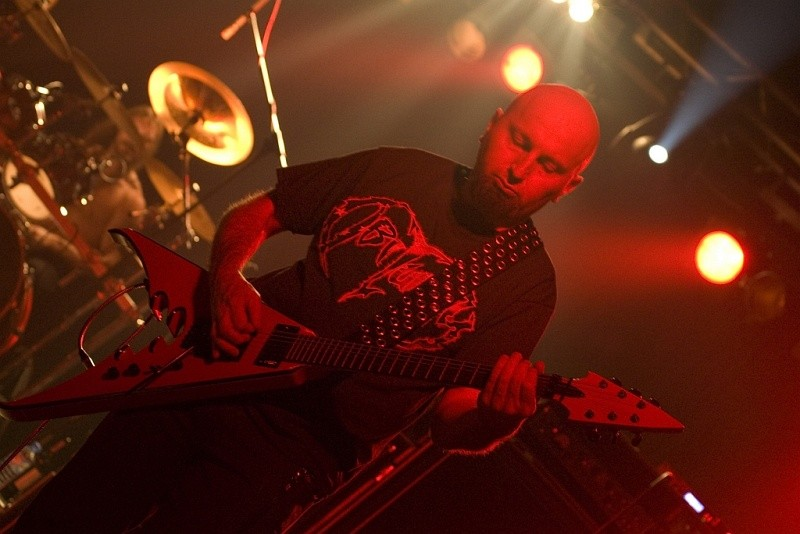
Guitarist Jack Owen joined Deicide in 2004, replacing the Hoffman brothers, and remained as a member of the band until 2016.

In January 2007, Benton left the European tour and returned to the United States as a result of legal issues at home. Asheim announced that Seth van Loo, from opening act Severe Torture, and Garbaty "Yaha", from Polish death metal band Dissenter, would replace Benton, starting on January 9 in the Netherlands, until Benton could rejoin the tour. Benton rejoined the band in Paris on January 13. On May 24, 2007, it was announced Ralph Santolla had left Deicide. Subsequently, he joined Florida's Obituary and appeared on their album Xecutioner's Return as well as the tour. On July 20, 2007, guitarist Jack Owen announced that Deicide would be on hiatus and he had temporarily joined Ohio-based deathrash band Estuary for touring purposes. The band embarked on a Balkan tour, dubbed "Balkans AssassiNation Tour", in October 2007 alongside Krisiun, Incantation and Inactive Messiah. Owen called the tour a "death metal vacation."

By November 2007, Deicide began work on their ninth studio album at Florida's Morrisound Studios. Entitled Till Death Do Us Part, the follow-up to The Stench of Redemption, promised to be the band's "most savage and aggressive [offering] to date", according to a press release. Asheim recorded drum tracks and Benton started recording vocals in December 2007. In April 2008, two songs off the album were posted online. It was released on April 28, 2008. As the record was coming out, Benton considered retiring from music in the midst of personal matters, including a custody battle.

On January 6, 2009, Deicide posted a blog on their official Myspace page saying they had signed a worldwide record deal with Century Media, with Ralph Santolla returning to the band for a European tour. They were said to be working on material for a summer 2010 release. In early 2009, they toured with Vital Remains and Order of Ennead. Guitarist Kevin Quirion of Order of Ennead joined the band in the summer of 2009. In June 2010, Benton revealed that the next Deicide album would be titled To Hell with God. Mark Lewis produced it at Audiohammer Studios in Sanford, Florida, and it was released on February 15, 2011.

Santolla left Deicide in 2011, with Quirion returning. Benton explained on Facebook that Santolla did not write anything, was always drunk, threw up in the studio when tracking leads, and made them sound sloppy live. He accused Santolla of not being Christian, and said he fired him in Italy and finished the tour as a three piece.

The eleventh studio album, In the Minds of Evil, was released on November 26, 2013. On October 9, 2014, The Village Voice reported that Deicide had started working on new material for their twelfth studio album.

Deicide toured with Entombed A.D. and Hate Eternal in the spring of 2015.

=== Recent activity (2016-present) ===
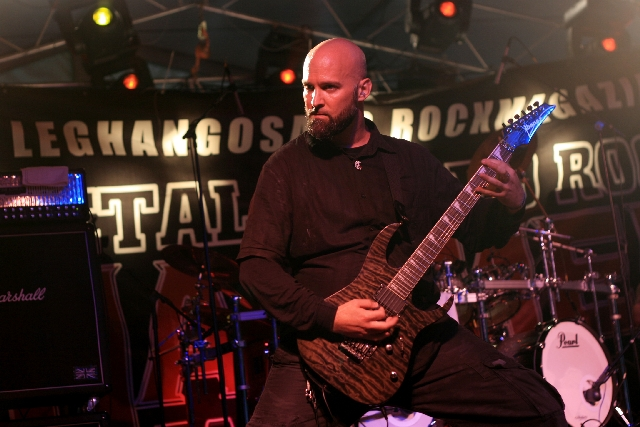
Guitarist Kevin Quirion has occasionally been a member of Deicide since 2007.

By November 2016, it became apparent that guitarist Jack Owen was no longer in the band, and had been replaced with Monstrosity guitarist Mark English without an official announcement. Owen claimed Asheim and Benton rewrote his new material and claimed writing credit, leading to him ghosting them. Benton said Asheim took two of Owen's tracks and turned them into one good song. Asheim recounted redoing the songs with Benton, which Owen disliked, leading to him not coming back. Benton later expressed regret for “being a smartass” during the incident. Owen joined Six Feet Under in February 2017. Benton stated that the band has “no hard feelings” towards Owen and that they were happy for him for joining Six Feet Under.

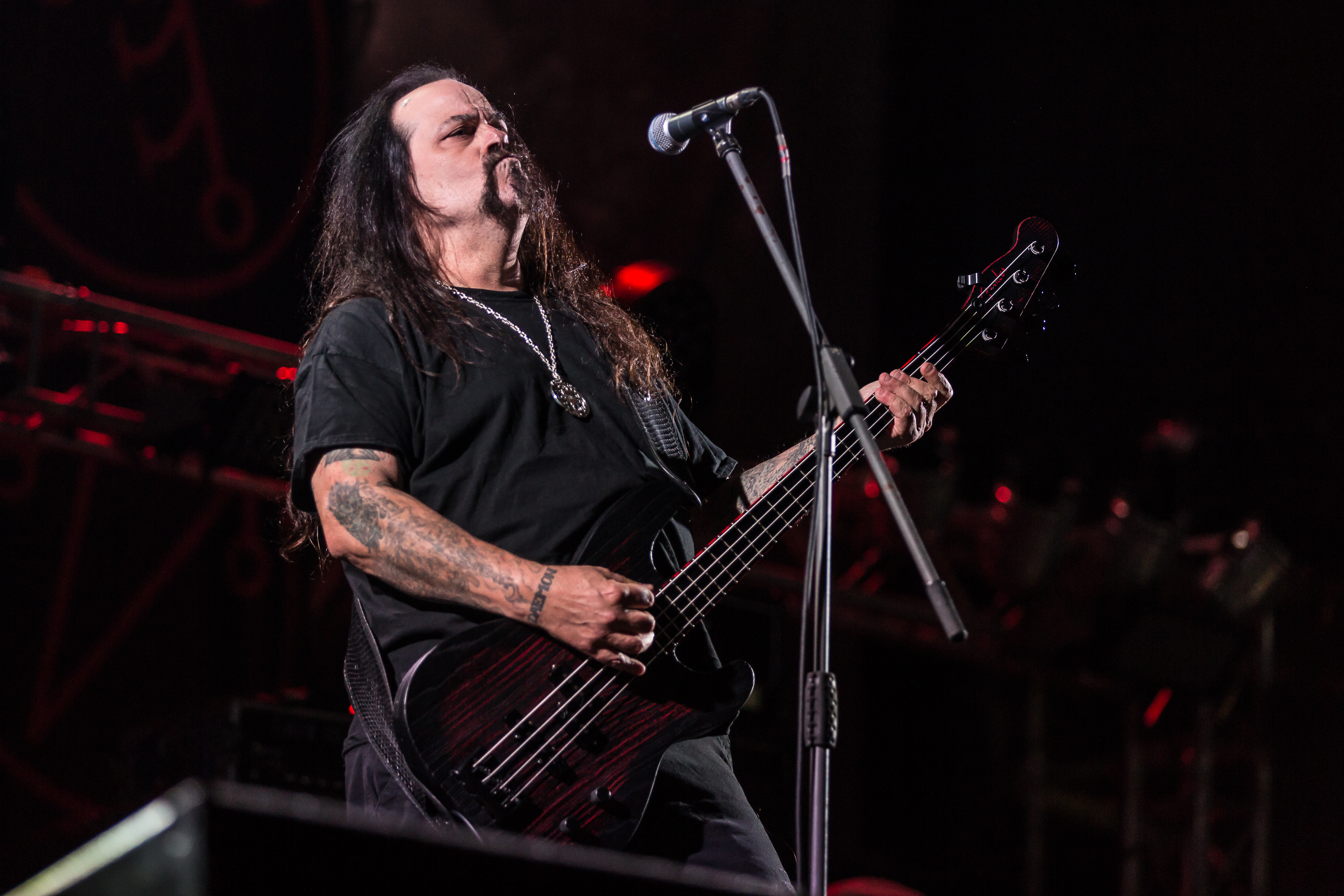
Benton performing in 2023

On March 10, 2017, Deicide announced a short U.S. tour that would begin in May with English, as well as that the new album was almost completed. Deicide's twelfth studio album, Overtures of Blasphemy, was released on September 14, 2018.

On June 6, 2018, former guitarist Ralph Santolla died due to complications following a heart attack and was taken off life support since being in a coma for a week. Benton stated that the two had made peace before Santolla's death, going as far as to say "I hope he's in a better place and I hope he's happy."

In February 2019, Deicide parted ways with English and replaced him with Autumn's End vocalist/guitarist Chris Cannella.

On April 17, 2021, the band performed in front of a full-capacity audience at The Verona in New Port Richey amid the COVID-19 pandemic, as all restrictions for businesses were lifted and mask mandate enforcements for local cities in Florida were removed as the state was moved into Stage 3 in late September 2020. A U.S. tour followed, with Kataklysm, Internal Bleeding and Begat the Nephilim.

On January 19, 2022, Cannella left the band and guitarist Taylor Nordberg replaced him. The thirteenth album, Banished by Sin, was released through Reigning Phoenix Music on April 26, 2024. It was the "album of the month" on metallian.com. The band toured Europe in 2024. They performed at Milwaukee Metal Fest in that year.

Deicide was scheduled to tour the US with Exodus in 2025, but it was announced in March of that year that they would pull out due to scheduling conflicts, according to Metal Injection. Possessed was added to the bill in their place.

On May 18, 2025, Quirion announced his departure from Deicide for personal reasons. Jadran "Conan" Gonzalez replaced him.

In early 2026, Deicide was announced as support for Behemoth on their spring 2026 tour with Rotting Christ and Immolation. This tour included an appearance at the Sonic Temple music festival in Columbus, Ohio on May 14. On the same day, the first known interview in the band's history featuring both Benton and Asheim was conducted and hosted by Hells Headbangers Records co-founder Justin Horval. The band are confirmed to appear at Welcome to Rockville, in Daytona Beach, Florida in May 2026.

== Musical style and influences ==
Deicide are considered a death metal band, with Dom Lawson of Metal Hammer writing, "in terms of defining the sound of Floridian death metal in the early 90s, few bands are either as iconic or as notorious." In a review for The Stench of Redemption, Greg Prato of AllMusic referred to Deicide as "one of the longest-running death metal/black metal bands from the U.S.", with one song influenced by grindcore, and Deicide retaining their overall "trademark extreme metal sound" on the entire album. Additionally, Deicide's albums following their debut album have been called brutal death metal by Kerrang.

According to Benton, Deicide was initially influenced by early extreme metal acts such as Venom, Possessed and Death. Original guitarist Eric Hoffman was introduced to extreme metal such as Bathory, Sodom, and Slayer by his brother Brian while the two were in high school. Eric, who was slightly older than his brother, was also influenced by Led Zeppelin, Black Sabbath and Yngwie Malmsteen. Brian stated that he was influenced by "anything Satanic, basically. Anything fucking evil. [...] Anything crazy."

Music journalist T Coles stated: "Though few would accuse Deicide of having pop sensibilities, there was something fun and catchy about them. This is in part thanks to Glen Benton's vocals; individual words are barked out, retaining the evil vibe, and the staccato delivery builds tension before breaking it back down with chaotic guitar solos." Benton's high shrieks have drawn comparisons to black metal. Both the Hoffman brothers tended to play technical solos at fast speeds and with overlapping riffs, which allowed Deicide to achieve the definitive heavy sound and complex song structures for which they would become known. Their guitar tones on early releases have been noted for their extreme high frequency. According to Zeke Ferrington of Gear Gods, "It sounds like they plugged their pedals into a BBE Sonic Maximizer, then straight into the [mixing] desk with a HPF at 800hz and an upper mid boost."

Deicide's lyrics explore vehement anti-Christian themes, as well as themes of deicide, blasphemy, Satanism, suicide, human sacrifice, and hell. Deicide's songs have been described as "misanthropic odes to Satan" by Exclaim. Some of the band's song titles include "Death to Jesus", "Fuck Your God", "Kill the Christian", "Behead the Prophet", "Scars of the Crucifix", and "Christ Don't Care". Despite these lyrical themes, drummer Steve Asheim has denied belief in Satan or any other fire deity, explaining that the point of Satanic music is to blaspheme against the Church.

== Controversy and censorship ==
Deicide has received considerable controversy throughout their career, particularly due to Benton's statements. Benton has repeatedly branded an inverted cross into his forehead on at least 12 different occasions. During an interview with NME magazine, he shot and killed a squirrel with a pellet gun to prevent any further damage to his electrical system in the attic at the location the interview was held. This act garnered negative attention from critics and some animal rights activists. Benton had professed beliefs in theistic Satanism during Deicide's early years, claimed to slaughter rodents for fun, and that he held beliefs in demonic possession and that he was possessed. Such statements had eventually been concluded as tongue-in-cheek and little more than sensationalism by other members. Additionally, Benton claimed in the early 1990s that he would commit suicide at the age of 33 to "mirror" a lifespan opposite that of Jesus Christ. However, he passed that age in 2000 and did not commit suicide, rebutting in 2006 that these statements had been "asinine remarks" and that "only cowards and losers" choose to kill themselves.

Deicide has been banned from playing in several venues, such as in Valparaíso, Chile over a promotional poster featuring Jesus Christ with a bullet hole in his forehead; and from festivals such as Hellfest, after several graves had been spray-painted with "When Satan Rules His World", a reference to a song from Deicide's 1995 album Once upon the Cross. Their music video for "Homage for Satan", which features blood-splattered zombies on a rampaging mission to capture a priest, was banned from UK music TV channel Scuzz.

Deicide used rotting meat during their live performances for a short period of time, leading to trouble with law enforcement. Benton recalled filling up mannequins with rotting chitlins and beef livers for "a slaughterfest of meat going everywhere" onstage, as well as dumping rotten pig guts on an audience member. This led to the sheriff and health department investigating the band and venues, and the authorities tested the animal entrails out of suspicion that they were human. Benton did not expect it to be a big problem, but the involvement of authorities after three shows made it "a very short-lived moment in Deicide history.” Steve Asheim stated they achieved their intention of scaring people. Benton later reflected on it, stating that they wanted to be "as sick as fuckin' possible" as kids, but were not thinking about it making people very sick until they matured.

== Band members ==
=== Current ===
- Steve Asheim – drums (1987–present), guitars (2007–2008, 2018)
- Glen Benton – bass, lead vocals (1987–present)
- Taylor Nordberg – guitars, backing vocals (2022–present)
- Jadran "Conan" Gonzalez – guitars, backing vocals (2025–present)

=== Former ===
- Eric Hoffman – guitars (1987–2004)
- Brian Hoffman – guitars (1987–2004)
- Ralph Santolla – guitars (2005–2007, 2008–2009, 2010–2011) (died 2018)
- Jack Owen – guitars (2004–2016)
- Mark English – guitars (2016–2019)
- Chris Cannella – guitars, backing vocals (2019–2022)
- Kevin Quirion – guitars, backing vocals (2007–2008, 2009–2010, 2011–2025)

=== Live ===
- Dave Suzuki – guitars, backing vocals (2004–2005)
- Seth Van Loo – vocals (2007)
- Dariusz "Garbaty Yaha" Kułpiński – bass, lead vocals (2007)

=== Recording timeline ===
Role	Album												
Role	Deicide (1990)	Legion (1992)	Once upon the Cross (1995)	Serpents of the Light (1997)	Insineratehymn (2000)	In Torment in Hell (2001)	Scars of the Crucifix (2004)	The Stench of Redemption (2006)	Till Death Do Us Part (2008)	To Hell with God (2011)	In the Minds of Evil (2013)	Overtures of Blasphemy (2018)	Banished by Sin (2024)
Bass/vocals	Glen Benton	Glen Benton	Glen Benton	Glen Benton	Glen Benton	Glen Benton	Glen Benton	Glen Benton	Glen Benton	Glen Benton	Glen Benton	Glen Benton	Glen Benton
Guitars	Eric Hoffman	Eric Hoffman	Eric Hoffman	Eric Hoffman	Eric Hoffman	Eric Hoffman	Eric Hoffman	Ralph Santolla	Ralph Santolla	Ralph Santolla	Kevin Quirion	Kevin Quirion	Kevin Quirion
Guitars	Brian Hoffman	Brian Hoffman	Brian Hoffman	Brian Hoffman	Brian Hoffman	Brian Hoffman	Brian Hoffman	Jack Owen	Jack Owen	Jack Owen	Jack Owen	Mark English	Taylor Nordberg
Drums	Steve Asheim	Steve Asheim	Steve Asheim	Steve Asheim	Steve Asheim	Steve Asheim	Steve Asheim	Steve Asheim	Steve Asheim	Steve Asheim	Steve Asheim	Steve Asheim	Steve Asheim

== Discography ==
- Deicide (1990)
- Legion (1992)
- Once upon the Cross (1995)
- Serpents of the Light (1997)
- Insineratehymn (2000)
- In Torment in Hell (2001)
- Scars of the Crucifix (2004)
- The Stench of Redemption (2006)
- Till Death Do Us Part (2008)
- To Hell with God (2011)
- In the Minds of Evil (2013)
- Overtures of Blasphemy (2018)
- Banished by Sin (2024)
