= Steve Asheim =

American drummer (born 1970)

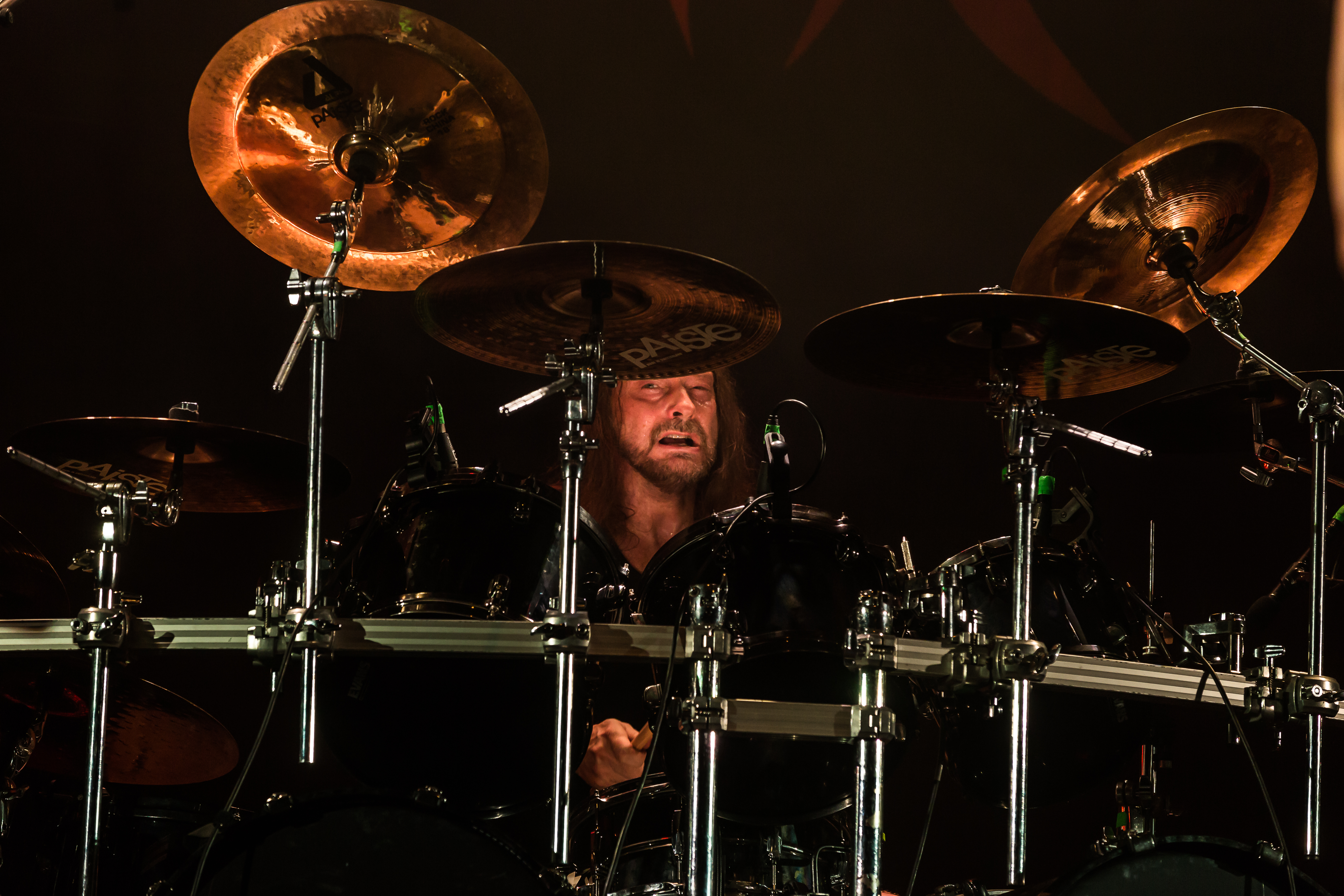
- Asheim in 2019

Background information
- Born: Steven Kenneth Asheim; January 17, 1970 (age 56)
- Genres: Death metal, black metal
- Occupations: Musician, songwriter
- Instruments: Drums, guitar
- Years active: 1983–present
- Member of: Deicide; Order of Ennead
- Formerly of: Council of the Fallen
- Website: deicideofficial.com

Steven Kenneth Asheim (born January 17, 1970) is an American drummer and primary songwriter for the Florida death metal band Deicide. Asheim endorses Pearl, Paiste, Vater, Axis and is known to collect guns, which can be seen in Deicide's DVD When London Burns. Asheim also plays guitar on the album Till Death Do Us Part. On November 20, 2007, Asheim joined the St. Petersburg, Florida-based death/black metal band Council of the Fallen (later renamed Order of Ennead) as their drummer.

== Biography ==
Steven Kenneth Asheim was born in Freehold, New Jersey and is of Norwegian descent through his grandparents who were from Stavanger. His first instrument was the trumpet, but after a few months, he started playing self-taught drums at age 11 and began to play in small bands at 13. He did his first demo in a studio of one of his school teachers in Freehold, New Jersey. In that period, he developed his interest in extreme drumming. He left his former bandmates because they wanted to play Mötley Crüe, while he was interested in playing Metallica and Slayer. In 1985, he moved to Florida and joined "Carnage," where he met Eric and Brian Hoffman. "Carnage" covered Slayer, Exodus, Celtic Frost and Dark Angel songs. After Carnage disbanded in 1986, Asheim and the Hoffman brothers started writing the early "Amon" songs. In 1987, they met Glen Benton and started demoing. Later, they changed the band name to Deicide.

On January 25, 2007, when making a trip to a bank in Innsbruck, Austria, to make a deposit from Deicide merchandise sales, Asheim was arrested on suspicion of connection with a recent bank robbery. Staff were perplexed by his appearance and attire, as well as the fact he was handling money marked in red dye. Detained by police in the local station, he explained the banknotes were legitimate proceeds from touring, and that he had a leaking pen in his pocket which was responsible for the money's discoloration. He was released without further charge.

He announced an upcoming classical piano solo album in March of 2026.

== Artistry ==
Asheim's drumming has been likened to the sound of artillery. He was influenced by bands such as Metallica, Slayer, Dark Angel, Destruction, and Sodom. His main drumming influences include Peter Criss, Clive Burr, Buddy Rich, Lars Ulrich and Dave Lombardo. Asheim was inspired to start playing extreme metal as a reaction against "all the lame ass pussy drum playing that was going on in the 80's". Asheim also plays guitar, bass and piano. He listens to classical piano to derive a better idea of what is possible in constructing songs and music, saying "some of that stuff rips it up and is actually reminiscent of metal".

== Personal life ==
Asheim is an avid firearm hobbyist, and owns a wide assortment of handguns, shotguns and rifles, as seen in the Behind the Scars documentary.
