= Obituary discography =

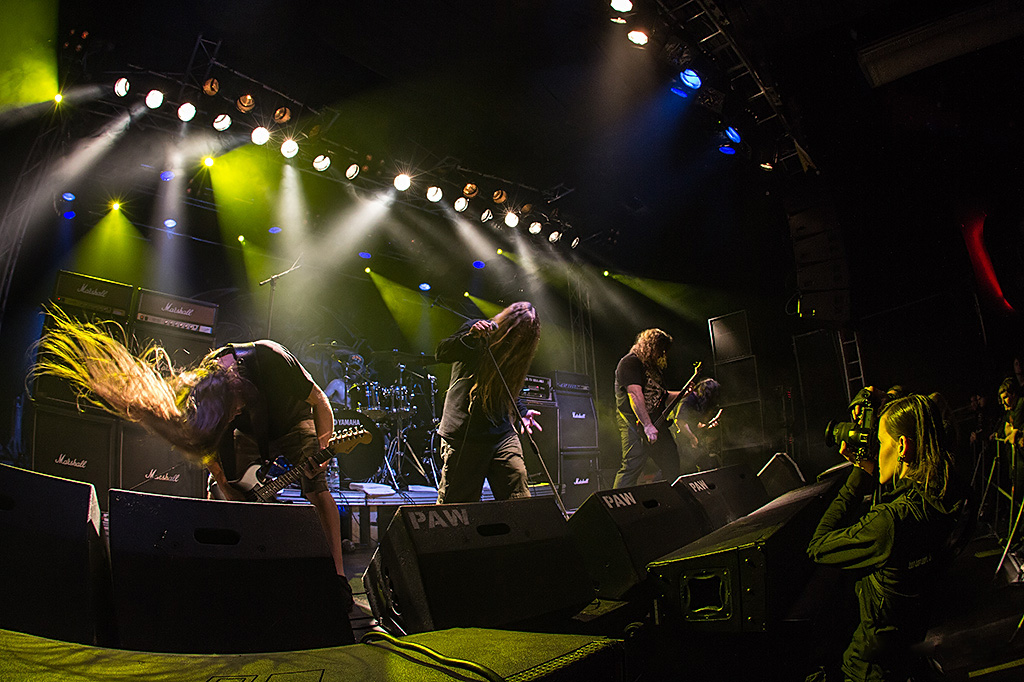
- Obituary performing in 2012
- Studio albums: 11
- EPs: 2
- Live albums: 3
- Compilation albums: 2
- Video albums: 2
- Music videos: 7

The discography of Obituary, an American death metal band, consists of eleven studio albums, three live albums, two compilation albums, two extended plays, two DVDs and seven music videos.

Obituary was formed in Tampa, Florida in 1984 under the name Executioner (later called Xecutioner). The band spent four years playing live locally and went through several line-up changes, before changing their name to Obituary in 1988. After signing to Roadrunner Records, Obituary's debut album, Slowly We Rot, was released in 1989, followed one year later by Cause of Death (1990); neither album charted.

Obituary gained their first mainstream exposure with their third studio album, The End Complete (1992), which was accompanied by their first music video "The End Complete", and was the band's first album to chart in the United States, United Kingdom and some parts of Europe, leading the album to sell more than a hundred thousand copies. Obituary continued their success with their next two studio albums—World Demise (1994) and Back from the Dead (1997)—before calling it quits in 1997.

Obituary reunited in 2003, and released their sixth studio album Frozen in Time two years later. Around 2006, Obituary ended their 18-year relationship with Roadrunner, and signed to the independent record label Candlelight Records, and their debut for the label Xecutioner's Return was released in 2007, followed two years later by Darkest Day (2009). Obituary did not release their next studio album, Inked in Blood, until 2014; it was their first release on Gibtown Music/Relapse Records, and their first to enter the Billboard 200 charts, where it peaked at number 75. That album was followed three years later by Obituary (2017), which was also successful, peaking at higher chart positions in Europe.

== Studio albums ==
Title	Album details	Peak chart positions								Sales
Title	Album details	US	US Heat	BEL (FL)	BEL (WA)	GER	NLD	SWI	UK	Sales
Slowly We Rot	Released: May 16, 1989; Label: Roadrunner Records; Formats: CD, LP, CS, digital download	—	—	—	—	—	—	—	—	
Cause of Death	Released: September 19, 1990; Label: Roadrunner Records; Formats: CD, LP, CS, digital download	—	—	—	—	—	—	—	—	
The End Complete	Released: April 21, 1992; Label: Roadrunner Records; Formats: CD, LP, CS, digital download	—	16	—	—	43	74	—	52	US: 103,378+
World Demise	Released: September 6, 1994; Label: Roadrunner Records; Formats: CD, LP, CS, digital download	—	17	—	—	59	49	39	65	
Back from the Dead	Released: April 22, 1997; Label: Roadrunner Records; Formats: CD, CS, digital download	—	25	—	—	—	92	—	—	
Frozen in Time	Released: July 12, 2005; Label: Roadrunner Records; Formats: CD, LP, digital download	—	44	—	—	93	—	—	—	US: 2,400+
Xecutioner's Return	Released: August 28, 2007; Label: Candlelight Records; Formats: CD, LP	—	27	—	—	—	—	—	—	US: 2,000+
Darkest Day	Released: June 30, 2009; Label: Candlelight Records; Formats: CD, LP	—	32	—	—	—	—	—	—	US: 1,200+
Inked in Blood	Released: October 28, 2014; Label: Gibtown Music/Relapse Records; Formats: CD, LP, digital download	75	—	121	90	56	81	65	174	US: 5,200+
Obituary	Released: March 17, 2017; Label: Relapse Records; Formats: CD, LP, digital download	184	—	45	83	24	67	34	—	
Dying of Everything	Released: January 13, 2023; Label: Relapse Records; Formats: CD, LP, digital download	—	—	51	—	7	24	8	—	
"—" denotes a recording that did not chart or was not released in that territory.

== Live albums ==
Title	Album details
Dead	Released: April 21, 1998; Label: Roadrunner Records; Formats: CD, CS, digital download
Slowly We Rot – Live and Rotting	Released: July 13, 2022; Label: Relapse Records; Formats: CD/blu-ray, CS, LP, digital download
Cause of Death – Live Infection	Released: July 13, 2022; Label: Relapse Records; Formats: CD/blu-ray, CS, LP, digital download

== Extended plays ==
Title	EP details
Don't Care	Released: July 26, 1994; Label: Roadrunner Records; Formats: CD, CS
Left to Die	Released: September 16, 2008; Label: Candlelight Records; Formats: CD, LP
Ten Thousand Ways to Die	Released: October 21, 2016; Label: Gibtown Music/Relapse Records; Formats: CD, LP

== Compilation albums ==
Title	Album details
Anthology	Released: January 23, 2001; Label: Roadrunner Records; Formats: CD, CS
The Best of Obituary	Released: January 29, 2008; Label: Roadrunner Records; Formats: CD, digital download

- Godly Beings (2025)

== Video albums ==
Title	Video details
Frozen Alive	Released: December 6, 2006; Label: Metal Mind Productions; Formats: DVD, DVD+CD
Live Xecution Party San 2008	Released: November 19, 2009; Label: Regain Records; Formats: DVD

== Music videos ==
Year	Title	Directed	Album
1992	"The End Complete"	—	The End Complete
1994	"Don't Care"	—	World Demise
2005	"Insane"	Michael Sarna	Frozen in Time
2006	"On the Floor"	—	Frozen in Time
2008	"Evil Ways"	Hart Fisher	Xecutioner's Return
2014	"Violence"	Balazs Grof & Obituary	Inked in Blood
2017	"Ten Thousand Ways To Die"	Balazs Grof	Obituary
2017	"Sentence Day"	James Pesature	Obituary
2017	"Brave"	Shaun Egger	Obituary
2022	"The Wrong Time"	Odd Life Studios	Dying Of Everything
2023	"Dying Of Everything"	Natalie Wood, Donald Tardy, Josh "BooBoo" Richardson	Dying Of Everything
2024	"Barley Alive"	Natalie Wood, Frank Huang	Dying Of Everything
