= Dead (Obituary album) =

Live album by Obituary
- Released: April 21, 1998
- Recorded: September 10, 1997
- Genre: Death metal
- Length: 62:47
- Label: Roadrunner
- Producer: Jaime Locke and Obituary

Obituary chronology
Back from the Dead (1997)	Dead (1998)	Anthology (2001)

Professional ratings
Review scores
Source	Rating
Allmusic	2.5/5 stars
Collector's Guide to Heavy Metal	7/10

Dead is a live album by American death metal band Obituary. The title is a comical reference to it being a "live" album.

== Track listing ==
No.	Title	Music	Original album	Length
1.	"Download"	Obituary	Back from the Dead	3:00
2.	"Chopped in Half"	Peres/D. Tardy/J. Tardy	Cause of Death	0:46
3.	"Turned Inside Out"	Peres/D. Tardy/J. Tardy	Cause of Death	5:03
4.	"Threatening Skies"	Obituary	Back from the Dead	2:27
5.	"By the Light"	Obituary	Back from the Dead	3:01
6.	"Dying"	Obituary/Peres	Cause of Death	4:36
7.	"Cause of Death"	Peres/J. Tardy/West	Cause of Death	5:43
8.	"I'm in Pain"	Peres/D. Tardy/J. Tardy	The End Complete	4:54
9.	"Rewind"	Obituary	Back from the Dead	4:03
10.	"'Til Death"	Obituary/J. Tardy	Slowly We Rot	4:25
11.	"Kill for Me"	Obituary	World Demise	2:34
12.	"Don't Care"	Obituary	World Demise	3:09
13.	"Platonic Disease"	Obituary	Back from the Dead	4:04
14.	"Back from the Dead"	Obituary	Back from the Dead	5:55
15.	"Final Thoughts"	Obituary	World Demise	4:01
16.	"Slowly We Rot"	Obituary/J. Tardy	Slowly We Rot	5:06
Total length:				62:47

== Personnel ==
- John Tardy - vocals
- Allen West - lead guitar
- Trevor Peres - rhythm guitar
- Frank Watkins - bass
- Donald Tardy - drums
