= The Best of Obituary =

Compilation album by Obituary
- Released: January 29, 2008
- Recorded: 1989–2005
- Genre: Death metal
- Length: 51:53
- Label: Roadrunner
- Producer: Jaime Locke, Mark Prator, Obituary, Scott Burns

Obituary chronology
Xecutioner's Return (2007)	The Best of Obituary (2008)	Left to Die (2008)

Professional ratings
Review scores
Source	Rating
Allmusic	4/5 stars

The Best of Obituary is a compilation album by death metal band Obituary, released in 2008.

== Track listing ==
All lyrics are written by John Tardy; all music is composed by Donald Tardy, Trevor Peres and Allen West.

No.	Title	Length
1.	"Internal Bleeding"	3:01
2.	"'Til Death"	3:56
3.	"Slowly We Rot"	3:37
4.	"Cause of Death"	6:31
5.	"Chopped in Half"	3:45
6.	"Turned Inside Out"	5:10
7.	"The End Complete"	4:04
8.	"I'm in Pain"	4:01
9.	"Don't Care"	3:09
10.	"Final Thoughts"	4:09
11.	"Kill for Me"	2:57
12.	"Threatening Skies"	2:20
13.	"On the Floor"	3:10

== Personnel ==
- John Tardy – vocals
- Trevor Peres – rhythm guitar
- James Murphy – lead guitar (tracks 4–6)
- Allen West – lead guitar (tracks 1–3, 7–13)
- Daniel Tucker – bass (tracks 1–3)
- Frank Watkins – bass (tracks 4–13)
- Donald Tardy – drums
