= Anthology (Obituary album) =

Greatest hits album by Obituary
- Released: January 23, 2001
- Recorded: 1988–1998
- Genre: Death metal
- Length: 77:27
- Label: Roadrunner
- Producer: Obituary, Scott Burns, Jaime Locke, Rick Miller and Mark Prator

Obituary chronology
Dead (1998)	Anthology (2001)	Frozen in Time (2005)

Professional ratings
Review scores
Source	Rating
AllMusic	4/5 stars
Kerrang!	4/5 stars
Metal Hammer	9/10

Anthology is a 2001 greatest hits album by American death metal band Obituary. It contains songs recorded during the band's early career, from 1989's Slowly We Rot to 1997's Back from the Dead. The compilation also contains two previously unreleased tracks, recorded in 1998 before the band separated.

== Track listing ==
All music by Obituary except where noted

No.	Title	Music	Length
1.	"Find the Arise" (Demo version)	JP Chartier/D. Tardy/J. Tardy	2:39
2.	"'Til Death"	John Tardy	3:56
3.	"Internal Bleeding"	John Tardy/Peres/West	3:02
4.	"Intoxicated"	John Tardy/Peres	4:40
5.	"Slowly We Rot"	John Tardy	3:38
6.	"Cause of Death"	Peres/J. Tardy/West	6:31
7.	"Dying"	Obituary/Peres	4:31
8.	"Chopped in Half"	Peres/D. Tardy/J. Tardy	3:44
9.	"Turned Inside Out"	Peres/D. Tardy/J. Tardy	5:10
10.	"Back to One"	D. Tardy/West	3:42
11.	"The End Complete"	Peres/D. Tardy/J. Tardy	4:04
12.	"I'm in Pain"	Peres/D. Tardy/J. Tardy	4:04
13.	"Kill for Me"	Peres/J. Tardy	2:56
14.	"Final Thoughts"		4:10
15.	"Don't Care"	Peres/J. Tardy	3:12
16.	"Threatening Skies"	Peres/J. Tardy	2:19
17.	"By the Light"		2:56
18.	"Back from the Dead"	Peres/J. Tardy	4:58
19.	"Buried Alive" (Venom cover)	Bray/Dunn/Lant	3:33
20.	"Boiling Point (212° Sporadic Mix)"		3:42
Total length:			77:27

== Charts ==
=== Monthly ===
Year	Chart	Position
2001	Poland (ZPAV Top 100)	91

== Personnel ==
- John Tardy - vocals (all tracks)
- Allen West - lead guitar (tracks 2, 3, 4, 5, 10–20)
- JP Chartier - lead guitar (track 1)
- Trevor Peres - rhythm guitar (all tracks)
- Daniel Tucker - bass (tracks 1–5)
- Frank Watkins - bass (tracks 6–20)
- Donald Tardy - drums (all tracks)
- James Murphy - lead guitar (tracks 6–10)
