= Declaration Day (disambiguation) =

Declaration Day or declaration day may refer to:

- Declaration Day, 6 April; a "rebrand" of Tartan Day to focus on commemoration of the Declaration of Arbroath in 1320 and other Scottish history rather than on tartans; organized since 2016 by a variety of Scottish local-government, heritage, and tourism bodies
- "Declaration Day", a song (in reference to the US Declaration of Independence) from the 2004 album The Glorious Burden by power/trash-metal band Iced Earth

== See also ==
- Independence Declaration Day, a name, alternative name, or translation of the name of national holidays in many countries; often instead called Independence Day or some other name
