= Embedded (Meathook Seed album) =

Studio album by Meathook Seed
- Released: March 1, 1993
- Genres: Industrial metal; death metal; groove metal; hardcore punk
- Length: 46:24
- Label: Earache
- Producer: Meathook Seed

Meathook Seed chronology
Embedded (1993)	Basic Instructions Before Leaving Earth (B.I.B.L.E.) (1999)

Embedded is the debut studio album by industrial metal band Meathook Seed, released in March 1993 by Earache Records. The group was founded as a side project by Napalm Death guitarist Mitch Harris in 1992, with the goal to mix industrial metal with death metal. The band was started as a result of collaboration between Harris, and Obituary members Donald Tardy and Trevor Peres, who handled the drums and vocals respectively.

== Overview ==
Embedded is a mix of death metal, industrial metal and hardcore punk, while the last track of the recording, "Sea of Tranquility", is an ambient and trance song. Every song in the album is different, in terms of tempo and structure alike.

== Reception ==
Professional ratings
Review scores
Source	Rating
AllMusic	3/5 stars

AllMusic reviewer Jason Birchmeier gave the album three stars out of five, stating that "this daring album may have only been a one-off side project for the trio", and still praising it as "impressive as anything the three released with Napalm Death and Obituary in the '90s".

== Track listing ==
- All songs written by Mitch Harris.

No.	Title	Length
1.	"Famine Sector"	4:09
2.	"A Furred Grave"	3:47
3.	"My Infinity"	3:01
4.	"Day of Conceiving"	3:20
5.	"Cling to an Image"	2:48
6.	"A Wilted Remnant"	4:34
7.	"Forgive"	3:24
8.	"Focal Point Blur"	3:04
9.	"Embedded"	2:07
10.	"Visible Shallow Self"	2:27
11.	"Sea of Tranquillity"	13:43
Total length:		46:24

== Personnel ==
=== Meathook Seed ===
- Trevor Peres – vocals
- Mitch Harris – guitars, bass, programming
- Donald Tardy – drums

=== Guest musicians ===
- Shane Embury – samples on "Sea of Tranquility"
- Steve Guney – samples on "Sea of Tranquility"

=== Technical personnel ===
- Meathook Seed – production
