= The Reckoning (Iced Earth song) =

Single by Iced Earth

from the album The Glorious Burden
- Released: October 21, 2003
- Recorded: Morrisound Studios (Tampa, Florida)
- Genre: Heavy metal; thrash metal; power metal
- Length: 17:41
- Label: SPV
- Songwriter: Jon Schaffer
- Producers: Jim Morris; Jon Schaffer

Iced Earth singles chronology
"Frankenstein" (2001)	"The Reckoning" (2003)	"Setian Massacre" (2007)

"The Reckoning" is a single by American heavy metal band Iced Earth.

The single was released in October 2003, but originally the band had planned to release the album The Glorious Burden (from which the tracks on "The Reckoning" are taken from) in October 2003, but after the band was forced to move the album's release date due to singer Matt Barlow's departure from the band, record company released "The Reckoning" in order to fill in the gap. "The Reckoning" was also the first Iced Earth release from to feature lead vocalist Tim "Ripper" Owens.

The single contains four tracks: "The Reckoning (Don't Tread on Me)", an unplugged version of "When the Eagle Cries", "Valley Forge" and "Hollow Man". The last three songs were included because they were considered the "softest" tracks from The Glorious Burden and were the most likely to get radio airplay. The title-track was included in order to show fans that band was still as intense as ever. A music video was also filmed for the title-track.

The unplugged version of "When the Eagle Cries" was only released on "The Reckoning" and the limited edition of The Glorious Burden. A music video was also shot for the track.

== Track listing ==
No.	Title	Lyrics	Music	Length
1.	"The Reckoning (Don't Tread on Me)"	Jon Schaffer	Schaffer	4:56
2.	"When the Eagle Cries (Unplugged)"	Schaffer	Schaffer	3:34
3.	"Valley Forge"	Schaffer	Schaffer	4:46
4.	"Hollow Man"	Schaffer	Schaffer	4:25
Total length:				17:41

== Personnel ==
Iced Earth

- Jon Schaffer – rhythm guitar, backing vocals, co-producer
- Tim 'Ripper' Owens – lead vocals
- James MacDonough – bass guitar
- Richard Christy – drums

Other personnel

- Jim Morris – lead guitar, co-producer
- Ralph Santolla – lead guitar
- Matt Barlow – backing vocals
- Howard Helm – piano
- Sam King – backing vocals
- Jeff Day – backing vocals
- Leo Hao – cover art
