= Individual Thought Patterns =

Studio album by Death
- Released: June 22, 1993
- Studios: Morrisound Recording, Tampa, Florida
- Genre: Technical death metal
- Length: 40:12
- Label: Relativity
- Producers: Scott Burns, Chuck Schuldiner

Death chronology
Fate: The Best of Death (1992)	Individual Thought Patterns (1993)	Symbolic (1995)

Singles from Individual Thought Patterns
- 1. "The Philosopher" Released: 1993

Individual Thought Patterns is the fifth studio album by American death metal band Death, released on June 22, 1993, by Relativity Records. It is the only album by the band to feature guitarist Andy LaRocque, the first to feature drummer Gene Hoglan and the second and last to feature bassist Steve Di Giorgio. The album expands upon the technical death metal of the band's previous album, Human, and has been described as "one of the genre's most forward-thinking pieces," by Invisible Oranges.

The album has received both contemporary and retrospective acclaim, and contains the track "The Philosopher", for which a music video was made that received significant airplay on MTV.

== Background and recording ==
After embarking on a tour of America and Europe to support Human, frontman Chuck Schuldiner recruited Gene Hoglan of Dark Angel and Andy LaRocque of King Diamond to record the band's next album. Schuldiner also invited back Steve Di Giorgio to perform bass on the album, after he had performed bass on Human. Producer Scott Burns made a concerted effort to ensure the bass was not buried in the mix, as many felt was the case on Human. The fretless bass played by Di Giorgio on the album was nicknamed "The Frog," and had at the time just recently been built. He recalled: "It had a really cool, raw sound. It didn't sound like anything other than a string going through a pick-up, a super in-your-face kind of tone, so different for the early '90s. In Florida you've got all these creatures and the bass sounded like a frog. That's why Chuck called it 'The Frog', and we even put it in my thanks list, the nickname of my bass."

Schuldiner only wanted LaRocque to play solo sections, so he only sent LaRocque the few bars of the songs where the solo would be. LaRocque would then arrive at the studio without much preparation, and largely improvised the solos, impressing everyone. In a 2021 interview, LaRocque would downplay this account, saying that he did prepare multiple ideas and alternate melody lines for each solo. LaRocque did ultimately record doubles for several of Schuldiner's rhythm tracks in addition to his solos. Schuldiner was quoted saying: "I wanted everything about the album to be top-notch. I grew up listening to a lot of bands that had a twin-axe attack, and I think it's somewhat important to have if you really want to be heavy. It adds variety to the music. Just knowing that I was working with such a talented shredder like Andy really made me work hard."

Hoglan recorded on a Pearl "Custom Z" series drum kit with Paiste cymbals. According to him, the working title for "Overactive Imagination" was "Overactive Vagina." He recalls that John Tardy of Obituary visited the studio during the album's recording sessions, and that he stared at him in the control booth while he tracked drums for the song.

== Music and lyrics ==
Individual Thought Patterns was seen as a progression from its predecessor Human, showcasing "more progressive and sophisticated" songwriting and instrumentation. Additionally, it has been said to be "[not] brutal" by traditional death metal standards. According to Matt Mills of WhatCulture, "the calibre of the musicianship on [the album] is off the scale [...] packing prog into tight and fast death metal tracks." Schuldiner is quoted saying: "I hope Individual Thought Patterns lifts metal as an art form to a higher level. The album proves you can, without tuning your guitars extra low, sound heavy and melodic at the same time. I dare take chances as a songwriter. I don't set myself any boundaries, I leave the known roads. Progression is what keeps music exciting."

Despite the band's progressing technical prowess, the closing track "The Philosopher" has been described as one of the more accessible cuts from Death's later catalog, and has been called "Death’s biggest hit". According to MetalSucks, "Trapped in a Corner", the album's fourth track, "[bridged] the gap" between the melodic death metal of Europe and the scene emerging in America. The album's guitar riffs (some of which have been called "deceptively tricky") make use of staccato rhythms, tapping, arpeggios, and odd time signatures. According to author Peggy Grayson, Chuck Schuldiner's guitar tone on the album favors middle frequencies in comparison to what she described as a bass-heavy guitar sound present on Human. The album also features fretless bass playing provided by Steve Di Giorgio, who had previously played with the band on their previous album. The album employs shred guitar solos, and lead guitar duties are split between Chuck Schuldiner and Andy LaRocque of King Diamond.

Lyrical themes explored on the album include the music industry. Manager Eric Greif described the album as "an angry record, angry lyrically", attributing it to his conflict with Chuck Schuldiner at the time. "The Philosopher" is about "questioning the guidance and judgment of others".

== Tour ==
Guitarist Ralph Santolla joined the band for the April 1993 Full of Hate tour in Europe before the album's release, as well as the beginning of the tour for the album, which began in July 1993. Craig Locicero of the band Forbidden joined for the European leg of the tour, starting in September 1993, as Santolla was busy playing with his band Eyewitness. Hoglan and DiGiorgio returned for the tour.

== Reception and legacy ==
Professional ratings
Review scores
Source	Rating
AllMusic	4.5/5 stars
Collector's Guide to Heavy Metal	7/10
Kerrang!	4/5 stars
Metal Forces	9.5/10
Metal Hammer	5/5
Record Collector	4/5 stars

Jason Arnopp of Kerrang! in his positive review considered Individual Thought Patterns the band's best album since Leprosy from 1988, attributing it in parts to band leader Chuck Schuldiner's choice of personnel. Arnopp noted especially Gene Hoglan's drumming and the guitar work of Schuldiner and Andy LaRocque, concluding that together with bassist Steve Di Giorgio "they create an altogether heavier din than was the case with last year's 'Human' album, while still adding Trad Metal/Progressive touches in an almost surreal fashion."

The music video for "The Philosopher" appeared in the TV show Beavis and Butt-Head, where the duo mistake the boy in the video for "Jeremy" from the Pearl Jam video and mock Schuldiner's vocals.

Steve Huey of AllMusic wrote: "Individual Thought Patterns cemented Death's reputation as not only one of death metal's founders, but also one of its most creative, musically proficient, and listenable bands."

The album was reissued and remixed by Relapse Records in October 2011. That year, Aaron Maltz of Invisible Oranges credited Individual Thought Patterns for "sho[oting] Death to the forefront of the progressive death metal movement."

== Track listing ==
All songs written by Chuck Schuldiner.

No.	Title	Length
1.	"Overactive Imagination"	3:30
2.	"In Human Form"	3:57
3.	"Jealousy"	3:41
4.	"Trapped in a Corner"	4:14
5.	"Nothing Is Everything"	3:19
6.	"Mentally Blind"	4:49
7.	"Individual Thought Patterns"	4:01
8.	"Destiny"	4:06
9.	"Out of Touch"	4:22
10.	"The Philosopher"	4:13
Total length:		40:12

2011 reissue bonus disc 1
No.	Title	Length
1.	"Leprosy" (live in Germany - April 13, 1993)	6:03
2.	"Suicide Machine" (live in Germany - April 13, 1993)	4:29
3.	"Living Monstrosity" (live in Germany - April 13, 1993)	5:12
4.	"Overactive Imagination" (live in Germany - April 13, 1993)	3:40
5.	"Flattening of Emotions" (live in Germany - April 13, 1993)	4:27
6.	"Within the Mind" (live in Germany - April 13, 1993)	5:45
7.	"In Human Form" (live in Germany - April 13, 1993)	4:02
8.	"Lack of Comprehension" (live in Germany - April 13, 1993)	3:55
9.	"Trapped in a Corner" (live in Germany - April 13, 1993)	4:27
10.	"Zombie Ritual" (live in Germany - April 13, 1993)	4:32
11.	"The Exorcist" (studio outtake)	4:26
Total length:		50:59

2011 reissue bonus disc 2
No.	Title	Length
1.	"Overactive Imagination (instrumental)" (four-track demos - December 1992)	3:39
2.	"In Human Form (instrumental)" (four-track demos - December 1992)	3:44
3.	"The Philosopher (instrumental)" (four-track demos - December 1992)	4:05
4.	"Trapped in a Corner (instrumental)" (four-track demos - December 1992)	3:29
5.	"Individual Thought Patterns (instrumental)" (four-track demos - December 1992)	4:03
6.	"Jealousy (instrumental)" (four-track demos - December 1992)	3:45
7.	"Nothing is Everything (instrumental)" (four-track demos - December 1992)	3:21
8.	"Destiny (instrumental)" (four-track demos - December 1992)	3:54
9.	"Mentally Blind (instrumental)" (four-track demos - December 1992)	4:23
10.	"Out of Touch (instrumental)" (four-track demos - December 1992)	4:21
11.	"In Human Form (instrumental)" (Chuck's riff tape - 1992)	3:40
12.	"The Philosopher (instrumental)" (Chuck's riff tape - 1992)	3:35
13.	"Trapped in a Corner (instrumental)" (Chuck's riff tape - 1992)	2:29
Total length:		48:29

== Personnel ==
All information is taken from the CD liner notes of the original 1993 release and the 2011 reissue.

Death

- Chuck Schuldiner – guitars, vocals
- Andy LaRocque – guitars
- Steve Di Giorgio – fretless bass
- Gene Hoglan – drums, guitars on "The Exorcist"

Additional musicians

- Ralph Santolla – guitars (on Live in Germany performances)

Production

- Scott Burns – production, engineering
- Chuck Schuldiner – production
- René Miville – artwork
- David Bett – art direction
- Kathy Milone – design
- Jacob Speis – layout
- Alan Douches – mastering, remixing (2011 reissue)
- Jamal Ruhe – remixing (2011 reissue)

== Charts ==
Chart (1993)	Peak position
US Top Heatseekers Albums (Billboard)	30
