= Inked in Blood =

Studio album by Obituary
- Released: October 24, 2014
- Recorded: RedNeck Studio, January–April 2014
- Genre: Death metal
- Length: 49:11
- Label: Gibtown Music, Relapse
- Producer: Obituary

Obituary chronology
Darkest Day (2009)	Inked in Blood (2014)	Obituary (2017)

Professional ratings
Review scores
Source	Rating
Blabbermouth.net	8/10
Exclaim!	7/10
Laut.de	3/5 stars
Metal Hammer Germany	6/7
Metal Hammer UK	3.5/5 stars
Plattentests.de	7/10
Powermetal.de	9/10
Rock Hard	7.5/10

Inked in Blood is the ninth studio album by American death metal band Obituary. It was crowdfunded through Kickstarter and released on October 24, 2014 in Europe and October 28, 2014 in the United States, via Gibtown Music/Relapse Records. It is the first studio album with bassist Terry Butler and lead guitarist Kenny Andrews, making this the first Obituary album not to feature Frank Watkins on bass since 1989's Slowly We Rot. A deluxe edition of the album was also released containing two bonus tracks. It is their first album to appear on the Billboard 200 chart, selling 5,200 copies in its first week and peaking at 75.

== Track listing ==
All lyrics are written by John Tardy; all music is composed by Trevor Peres and Donald Tardy.

No.	Title	Length
1.	"Centuries of Lies"	2:08
2.	"Violent by Nature"	4:33
3.	"Pain Inside"	4:36
4.	"Visions in My Head"	4:14
5.	"Back on Top"	4:30
6.	"Violence"	2:06
7.	"Inked in Blood"	4:13
8.	"Deny You"	4:49
9.	"Within a Dying Breed"	5:36
10.	"Minds of the World"	3:24
11.	"Out of Blood"	3:19
12.	"Paralyzed with Fear"	5:38
Total length:		49:11

Deluxe edition CD bonus tracks
No.	Title	Length
13.	"Intoxicated [Re-Recorded]"	4:53
14.	"Bloodsoaked [Re-Recorded]"	3:19
Total length:		57:23

== Personnel ==
- John Tardy – vocals
- Kenny Andrews – lead guitar
- Trevor Peres – rhythm guitar
- Terry Butler – bass
- Donald Tardy – drums
