= Chopped in Half =

Song by Obituary

from the album Cause of Death
- Released: 1990
- Studio: Morrisound Recording
- Genre: Death metal
- Length: 3:43
- Composers: Trevor Peres and Donald Tardy
- Lyricist: John Tardy
- Producer: Scott Burns

"Chopped in Half" is a song by American death metal band Obituary, released as a track from their 1990 album Cause of Death. It is the "biggest hit" of the band's career, according to The Guardian.

== Style and lyrics ==
Musically, the song is described as "impossibly heavy, bass-driven [and] thrash-infested" by Rolling Stone. Loudwire described John Tardy's vocals on the track as sounding like a "feral swamp monster roar". Lyrically, the song is described as an "ode to literally chopping a guy in half" by Rolling Stone.

== Reception and legacy ==
Rolling Stone ranked the song at 74th on its list of the 100 greatest heavy metal songs of all time, and referred to the track as the album's "crowning jewel". A staff writer for the magazine also called it "the platonic ideal of Nineties death metal." Loudwire included the track in its list of "Metal Songs to Play on a Bar Jukebox to Make Normal People Leave". Staff writer Joe Divita explained that "CHOPPED IN HAUUUGHGHGHAAGHH!!" is what bar patrons hear when the song's opening line is played. He recalled that several bars he has visited have cut the song off before the midway point, and that one of them "even reverted to rotational hits" and disabled jukebox requests entirely. He called the song a "crowd pleaser".
