= Xecutioner's Return =

Studio album by Obituary
- Released: August 27, 2007
- Recorded: 2006–2007
- Genre: Death metal
- Length: 40:38
- Label: Candlelight
- Producer: Obituary

Obituary chronology
Frozen Alive (2006)	Xecutioner's Return (2007)	The Best of Obituary (2008)

Professional ratings
Review scores
Source	Rating
About.com	4/5 stars
AllMusic	4/5 stars
Blabbermouth	8.5/10 stars

Xecutioner's Return is the seventh studio album by American death metal band Obituary, released on August 28, 2007 through Candlelight Records. The title of the album is derived from the band's original band name, which was Xecutioner. The album is their first album since 1990's Cause of Death to be recorded without guitarist Allen West and the first album to feature guitarist Ralph Santolla. Though hailed as a partial return to the more speed-based style of the band's early work, it received positive reviews from critics but mixed reviews from the fanbase.

A music video was made for "Evil Ways".

== Track listing ==
All lyrics are written by John Tardy; all music is composed by Trevor Peres and Donald Tardy.

No.	Title	Length
1.	"Face Your God"	2:56
2.	"Lasting Presence"	2:12
3.	"Evil Ways"	2:57
4.	"Drop Dead"	3:35
5.	"Bloodshot"	3:25
6.	"Seal Your Fate"	2:30
7.	"Feel the Pain"	4:31
8.	"Contrast the Dead"	7:01
9.	"Second Chance"	3:28
10.	"Lies"	3:32
11.	"In Your Head"	4:31
Total length:		40:38

Limited edition bonus track
No.	Title	Length
12.	"Executioner Returns"	4:39
Total length:		43:45

== Personnel ==
- John Tardy – vocals
- Ralph Santolla – lead guitar
- Trevor Peres – rhythm guitar
- Frank Watkins – bass
- Donald Tardy – drums
