= Frozen in Time (album) =

Album of Obituary

Studio album by Obituary
- Released: July 12, 2005
- Recorded: 2004–2005
- Studio: Red Room Recorders Tampa
- Genre: Death metal
- Length: 34:16
- Label: Roadrunner
- Producer: Mark Prator, Obituary

Obituary chronology
Anthology (2001)	Frozen in Time (2005)	Frozen Alive (2006)

Professional ratings
Review scores
Source	Rating
AllMusic	4/5 stars
Blabbermouth	7.5/10

Frozen in Time is the sixth album by American death metal band Obituary. It was released on July 12, 2005, and was the band's first album in eight years since 1997's Back from the Dead, the last to feature lead guitarist Allen West, and their last album produced for Roadrunner Records.

Longtime contributor Scott Burns (who had not worked with Obituary since 1994's World Demise) reunited with the band as the producer for this album, though it would be the last time they would work with him as he retired from producing after its release.

Music videos were made for the songs "Insane" and "On the Floor".

== Track listing ==
All lyrics are written by John Tardy.

No.	Title	Music	Length
1.	"Redneck Stomp"	Allen West, Donald Tardy	3:32
2.	"On the Floor"	West, Donald Tardy	3:10
3.	"Insane"	West, Donald Tardy	3:25
4.	"Blindsided"	West, Donald Tardy	2:56
5.	"Back Inside"	Trevor Peres, Donald Tardy	2:42
6.	"Mindset"	West, Donald Tardy	3:54
7.	"Stand Alone"	Peres, Donald Tardy	3:44
8.	"Slow Death"	West, Donald Tardy	3:03
9.	"Denied"	Peres, Donald Tardy	3:37
10.	"Lockjaw"	Peres, Donald Tardy	4:13
Total length:			34:16

== Personnel ==
=== Obituary ===
- John Tardy – vocals, production
- Allen West – lead guitar, production
- Trevor Peres – rhythm guitar, production, package design
- Frank Watkins – bass, production
- Donald Tardy – drums, production

=== Technical personnel ===
- Mark Prator – production, engineering, mixing
- Scott Burns – executive production
- Aaron Callier – assistant engineering
- Tom Morris – mastering
- Andreas Marschall – cover illustration
- Daragh McDonagh – band photography
- Heather Wienker – frozen thoughts

== Charts ==
=== Monthly ===
Year	Chart	Position
2005	Poland (ZPAV Top 100)	38
