= Darkest Day =

- Cover art by Andreas Marschall

Studio album by Obituary
- Released: June 30, 2009
- Recorded: 2009
- Studio: RedNeck Gibsonton, Florida
- Genre: Death metal
- Length: 52:39
- Label: Candlelight
- Producer: Mark Prator

Obituary chronology
Left to Die (2008)	Darkest Day (2009)	Inked in Blood (2014)

Professional ratings
Review scores
Source	Rating
AllMusic	4/5 stars
Blabbermouth	7.5/10
About.com	3.5/5 stars

Darkest Day is the eighth studio album by the American death metal band Obituary. It was released on June 30, 2009, through Candlelight Records. Darkest Day is the final Obituary album to feature both longtime bassist Frank Watkins, who had played in the band since Cause of Death (1990), and guitarist Ralph Santolla.

== Track listing ==
All lyrics are written by John Tardy; all music is composed by Trevor Peres and Donald Tardy.

No.	Title	Length
1.	"List of Dead"	3:34
2.	"Blood to Give"	3:35
3.	"Lost Inside"	3:55
4.	"Outside My Head"	3:52
5.	"Payback"	4:29
6.	"Your Darkest Day"	5:07
7.	"This Life"	3:45
8.	"See Me Now"	3:23
9.	"Fields of Pain"	3:19
10.	"Violent Dreams"	1:58
11.	"Truth Be Told"	4:49
12.	"Forces Realign"	4:39
13.	"Left to Die"	6:20
Total length:		52:39

== Personnel ==
=== Obituary ===
- John Tardy – vocals, production, mixing
- Trevor Peres – guitar, production, mixing, packaging design
- Ralph Santolla – guitar, production, mixing
- Frank Watkins – bass, production, mixing
- Donald Tardy – drums, production, mixing

=== Technical personnel ===
- Mark Prator – recording, production, mixing
- Tim Turan – mastering
- Andreas Marschall – cover art
- Rudy De Doncker – photography
- Silvia Nesi Jorge – John Tardy live photo
- Stan Vincent – business supervision
- Greg Gall – tribal drums
- Randy Gonzalez & The Drunk Amigos – tribal drums
