= Trapped in a Corner =

Song by Death

from the album Individual Thought Patterns
- Studio: Morrisound Recording
- Genre: Death metal, melodic death metal
- Length: 4:14
- Label: Relativity Records
- Songwriter: Chuck Schuldiner
- Producers: Scott Burns, Chuck Schuldiner

"Trapped in a Corner" is a song by American death metal band Death from their album Individual Thought Patterns.

== Composition and style ==
The track contains elements and influences from melodic death metal, black metal, and classical music. MetalSucks said that the track "bridges the gap" between the European and American death metal styles that were developing during the time of the song's release. Metal Forces described the track as "a jarring, mid-tempo soundscape" that helps serve as the "backbone" of the album along with "Nothing is Everything".

== Reception ==
Loudwire called the intro "one of the best intro leads ever laid down."
