= Meathook Seed =

Industrial metal band

- Origin: United Kingdom, United States, France
- Genres: Industrial death metal
- Years active: 1992–1993, 1999
- Labels: Earache, Dream Catcher
- Past members: Mitch Harris; Donald Tardy; Trevor Peres; Christophe Lamouret; Ian Treacy; Shane Embury; Russ Russell
- Website: meathookseed.com

Meathook Seed was an industrial metal music project formed in 1992 by the Napalm Death guitarist, Mitch Harris. Two Meathook Seed albums were released.

== Embedded ==
Meathook Seed's first album, Embedded, was released in 1993 by Earache Records. The band consisted at that time of Harris and the Obituary members Donald Tardy and Trevor Peres. Peres, being Obituary's guitarist, took the role of vocalist here. The album had two instrumental tracks on it: "Embedded" and "Sea of Tranquility", the latter a nearly 14-minute-long hypnotic track of alienating and electronic sounds, with samples by Shane Embury (also of Napalm Death fame) and Steve Guney. Earlier prints of the album used printed semi-transparent paper along with thick, coated paper for the artwork, while later editions used regular paper only.

== Basic Instructions Before Leaving Earth (B.I.B.L.E.) ==
In 1999, Meathook Seed released a second album, Basic Instructions Before Leaving Earth (B.I.B.L.E.), recorded by Paul "Bag" Siddens and Si Reeves at Framework Studios in Birmingham. With the original Obituary members replaced, the band's sound changed from industrial metal to a more industrial rock sound. The French Out vocalist, Christophe Lamouret, took on the vocals, while the former Benediction drummer Ian Treacy and Napalm Death bassist Shane Embury. Longtime Napalm Death producer Russ Russell was also added to complete the line-up.
