= Ralph Santolla =

American guitarist (1966–2018)

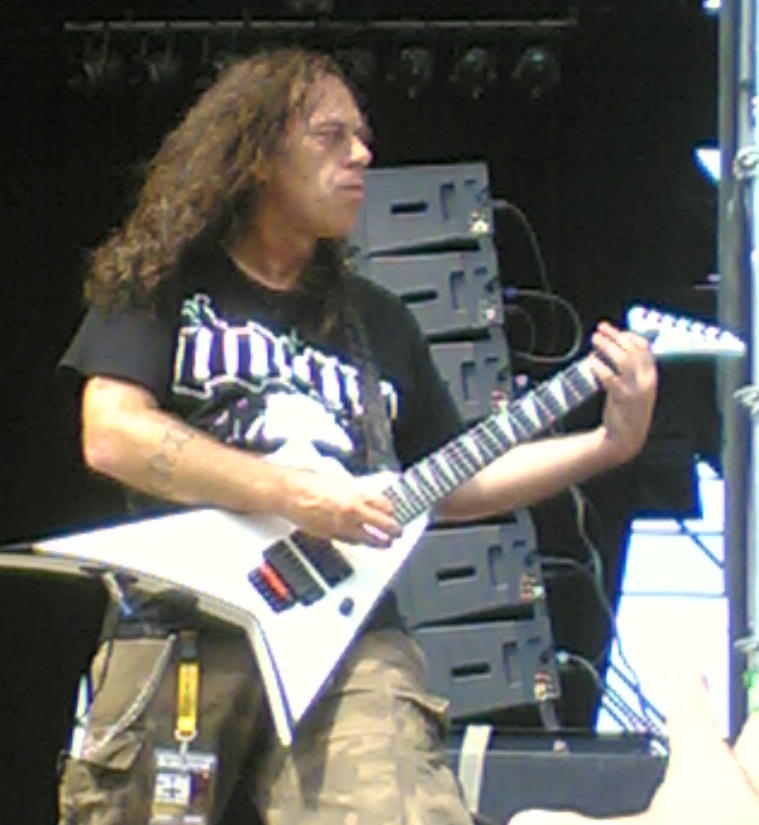
- Santolla performing in 2008

Background information
- Born: December 8, 1966; Charlotte, North Carolina, U.S.
- Origin: Tampa, Florida, U.S.
- Died: June 6, 2018 (aged 51) Tampa, Florida, U.S.
- Genres: Heavy metal; death metal; technical death metal; thrash metal
- Occupation: Guitarist
- Years active: 1989–2018
- Formerly of: Obituary, Deicide, Memorain, Sebastian Bach, Toxik

Ralph Santolla (December 8, 1966 – June 6, 2018) was an American heavy metal and extreme metal guitarist. He played in many bands, most notably Deicide, but also including Eyewitness, Death (he never recorded any of their albums, but toured with them in 1993 and appeared in "The Philosopher" video), Millenium, Iced Earth, and the Sebastian Bach band. In 2007, he replaced Allen West in Obituary for their album Xecutioner's Return.

== Career ==
Santolla was born on December 8, 1966 in Charlotte, North Carolina, but was raised in Tampa, Florida.

He formed a band named Eyewitness with drummer Oliver Hanson, and was joined by Keith Sterling, Shawn Phillips and vocalist Todd Plant. The band recorded several demos and signed with UK-based Now and Then Records. Eyewitness released a self-titled album in 1995, which had covers of songs by UFO and Zeno, and played at the Astoria 2 in London that same year. Their next album, Messiah Complex, was released in 1996. The album did not do as well, and the band replaced one of their members, Hodson, with Manfred Binder, in addition to taking on a new band name, Millenium. They released an album in 1999, called Angelfire. Plant was replaced by Jørn Lande and a second album was released in 2000, called Hourglass.

Santolla played with Death as a substitute for Andy LaRocque during the Full of Hate festival in Europe in 1993, as well as the beginnings of their US tour for the Individual Thought Patterns album. He remarked in a 2005 interview with Killing Spree Records that leaving the band was a "big mistake".

He joined Iced Earth and played on The Glorious Burden album in 2004, as well as the accompanying tour. He later played with Sebastian Bach, though he "was not happy with the way things were going." Santolla began working on his own band, Stare, in addition to another album by Millenium.

Santolla left Bach's band by July 2005 and had joined Deicide around April of that year, after Eric and Brian Hoffman left the band. He was coincidentally Eric Hoffman's guitar teacher for a brief period. According to Hoffman, when asked if he harbored any animosity towards Santolla for replacing him in the band: "He gave me two guitar lessons for a Marshall cab. He still owes me some lessons. No problem, other than some lessons, or some cash. You have the Internet to be your teacher. You can learn all the scales and modes, all the tabs. It is awesome. That is your new teacher, the computer."

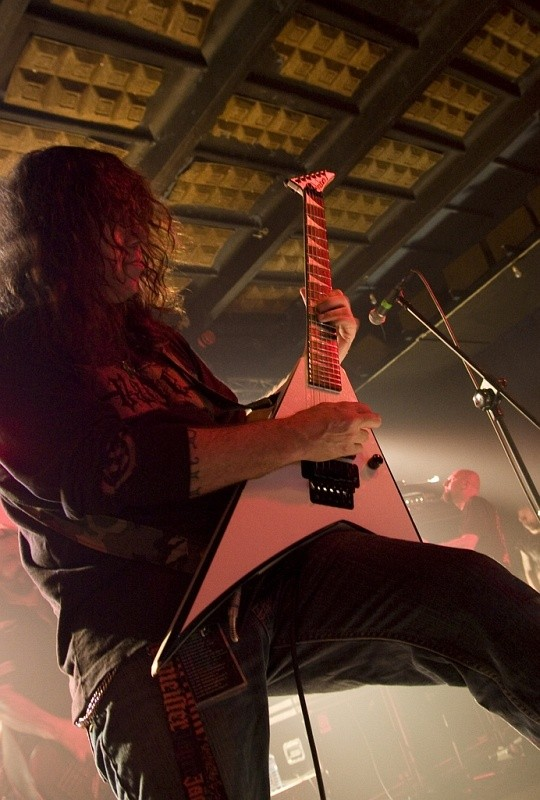
Santolla with Deicide in 2009

At a 2006 Deicide gig in Laredo, Texas that got out of control, Santolla was arrested for allegedly throwing a Red Bull can at an officer after Deicide was forced to stop playing.

Santolla had talked about starting his own band, called Ex Cathedra, with Steve Di Giorgio and Gene Hoglan, both of whom he worked with in Death, as well as Michael Amott of Carcass, in addition to an undisclosed singer.

Before his death, Santolla was working on a new solo instrumental album, titled Requiem for Hope. This is his second solo album, his first being Shaolin Monks in the Temple of Metal.

On May 24, 2007, Santolla left Deicide for undisclosed reasons.

Also in 2007, Santolla was called in to fill the spot on Obituary's album Xecutioner's Return and the subsequent Left to Die EP, replacing Allen West after he was incarcerated until 2008. In 2010, he rejoined Deicide. In 2011, he departed the band for the final time.

He played guitar on Deathembers debut album, Going Postal, on track 9, "Hailing Down".

In 2013, Santolla became member of thrash metal band Toxik.

Santolla's last recording would be released right before his death. He played guest guitar on the song "From Neptune Towards Assyria" for the band Order ov Riven Cathedrals from Rome, Italy, on their 2018 release Göbekli Tepe and on the song "They Will Listen to the Dead" for the band BlightMass from Lyon/Tampa on their 2019 release Severed from Your Soul. While the album has been released after his death, the song and the album are dedicated to him.

== Artistry and equipment ==
Santolla last played Jackson Guitars, though he had also been associated with ESP Guitars, Dean Guitars and many others. He also used Randall Amplifiers. He was well known for his shred guitar playing style. Glen Benton described Santolla as a "Marshall-head-turned-on-11 kind of guy."

== Personal life ==
Santolla was a practicing Roman Catholic, which caused some controversy among Deicide fans, many of whom are against Christianity and are aware of frontman Glen Benton's open Satanism. Many were surprised that Benton even allowed Santolla join the band, due to his frequent criticism of the religion. However, Santolla stated that he was "not going to pretend to be some dark and evil person just so people think I'm metal," and also stated that he respected Benton for not being afraid to be true to himself, despite differences in their religion and beliefs. He also said his religious background "doesn't have anything to do with Deicide." He said, "I think a lot [sic] of these stupid fucks who are so up in arms about bands like Deicide [...] It's stupid. If they want to like, really worry about evil and shit like that, they shouldn't be worrying about a metal band, they should be worrying about child molesters and fuckin' Darfur and things like that."

Santolla took pride in his Italian heritage, and he played guitars by Jackson and Ibanez with the Italian flag painted onto them, as seen in Death's "The Philosopher" video.

== Death ==
On May 31, 2018, it was reported that Santolla had suffered a heart attack and fallen into a coma. He was taken off life support and died on June 6, 2018 at St. Joseph's Hospital in Tampa, Florida. He was 51 years old. Deicide frontman Glen Benton, from whom Santolla had been estranged following his departure from the band, stated that the two had "made peace" prior to his death. Benton is quoted saying: "I hope he's in a better place, and I hope he's happy."

== Discography ==
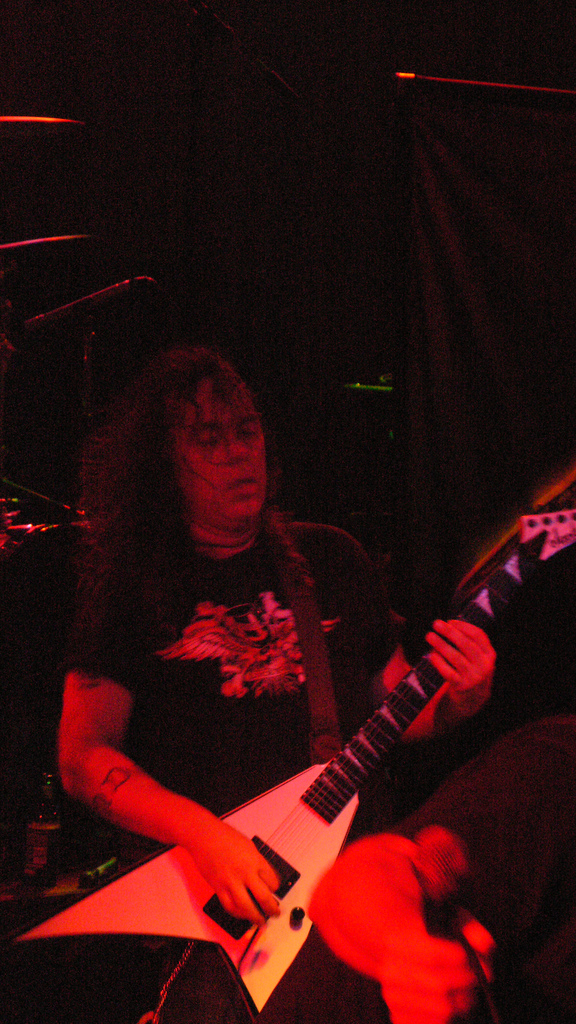
Santolla with Obituary in 2007

=== Eyewitness ===
- Eyewitness (1995)
- Messiah Complex (1996)

=== Millenium ===
- Millenium (1997)
- Angelfire (1999)
- Hourglass (2000)
- The Best of... and More – compilation (2004)
- Jericho (2004)

=== Iced Earth ===
- The Glorious Burden (2004)

=== Deicide ===
- The Stench of Redemption (2006)
- Till Death Do Us Part (2008)
- To Hell with God (2011)

=== Obituary ===
- Xecutioner's Return (2007)
- Left to Die (EP) (2008)
- Darkest Day (2009)

=== Tardy Brothers ===
- Tardy Brother's Bloodline (2009)

=== Gary Hughes ===
- Precious Ones (1998)

=== Order ov Riven Cathedrals ===
- Göbekli Tepe – track 5 – From Neptune Towards Assyria (2018)

=== Solo ===
- Shaolin Monks in the Temple of Metal (2002)
- Requiem for Hope (2007)

== See also ==
- Florida death metal
