= Trevor Peres =

American guitarist (born 1969)

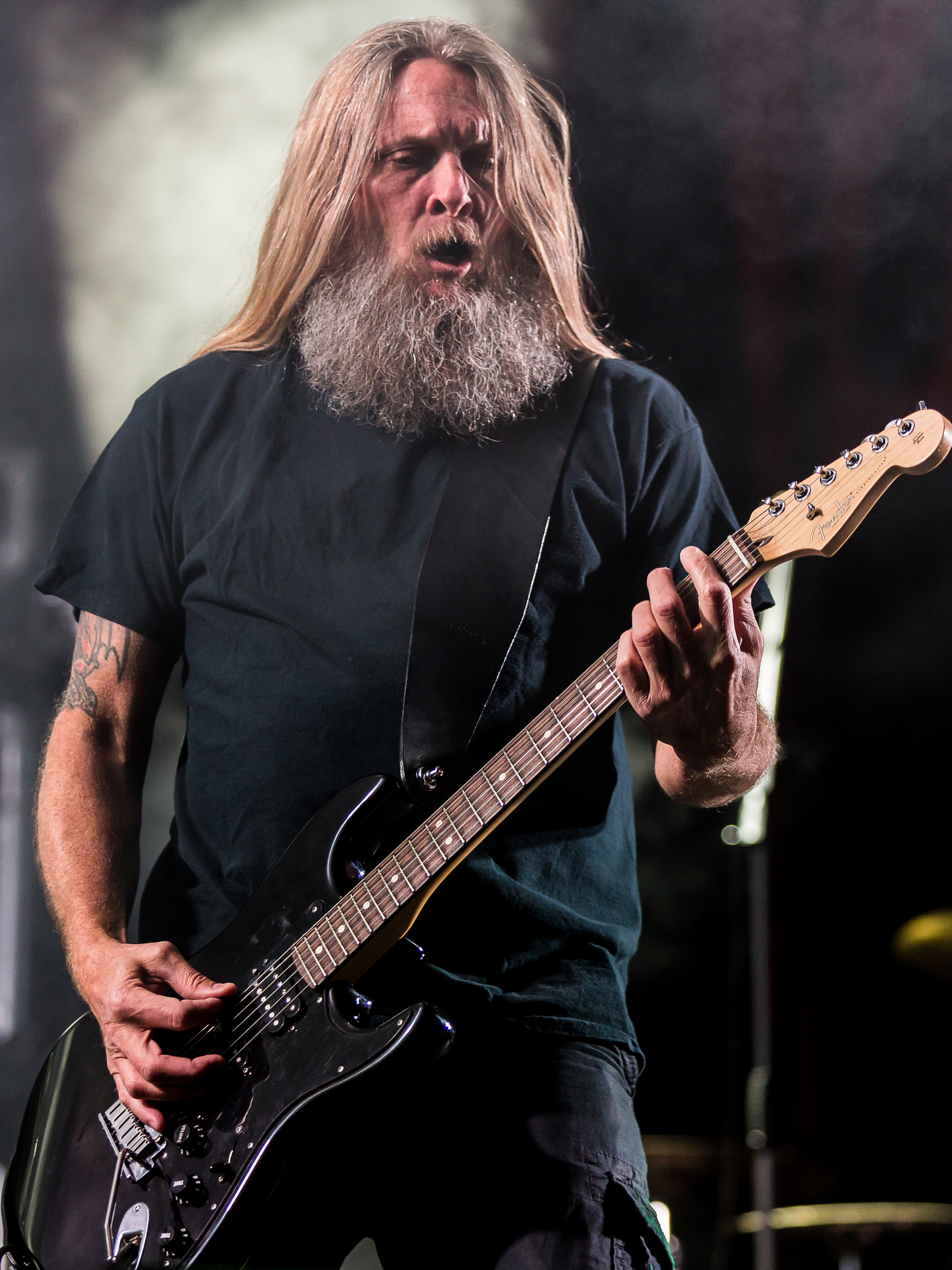
- Peres in 2023

Background information
- Born: July 25, 1969 (age 57)
- Origin: Jacksonville, Florida U.S.
- Genres: Death metal, industrial metal
- Occupation: Guitarist
- Years active: 1984–present
- Member of: Obituary
- Formerly of: Meathook Seed, Catastrophic
- Website: obituary.cc

Trevor Peres (born July 25, 1969) is an American heavy metal musician best known as the rhythm guitarist, songwriter and one of the founding members of the death metal band Obituary. He is the founder and former vocalist for the band Meathook Seed.

== Discography ==
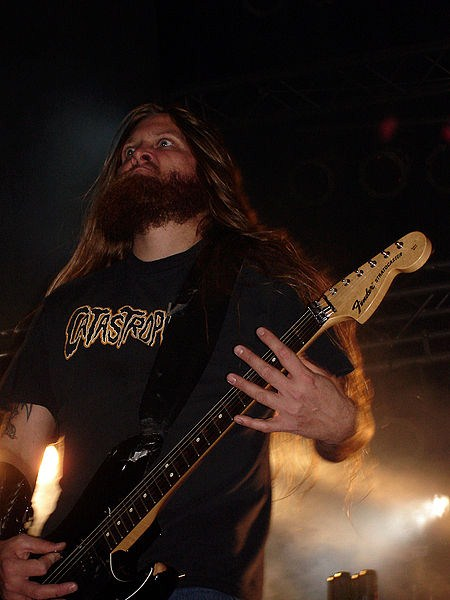
Peres performing in 2010

=== Obituary ===
- Raging Death (1987)
- Slowly We Rot (1989)
- Cause of Death (1990)
- The End Complete (1992)
- World Demise (1994)
- Don't Care (EP) (1994)
- Back from the Dead (1997)
- Dead (Live Album) (1998)
- Anthology (Compilation Album) (2001)
- Frozen in Time (2005)
- Frozen Alive (Live DVD) (2006)
- Xecutioner's Return (2007)
- Left to Die (EP) (2008)
- Live Xecution – Party San 2008 (DVD) (2009)
- Darkest Day (2009)
- Inked in Blood (2014)
- Obituary (2017)
- Dying of Everything (2023)

=== Meathook Seed ===
- Embedded (1993)

=== Catastrophic ===
- The Cleansing (2001)

=== Necro ===
- The Pre-Fix for Death (2004)

=== Holy Moses ===
- Agony of Death (2008)
