= The Philosopher (song) =

Song by Death

from the album Individual Thought Patterns
- Genre: Death metal
- Length: 4:13
- Songwriter: Chuck Schuldiner

"The Philosopher" is a song by American death metal band Death, released in 1993 as the closing track on the band's fifth studio album Individual Thought Patterns.

The track was often used to open Death's live sets late in the band's career. It is the most-streamed song on the album and is considered a fan-favorite.

A music video was produced for the track, which was mocked in an episode of the American animated series Beavis and Butt-Head. Online music magazine Loudwire listed this as being among the "worst takes on music" from the titular characters.

== Composition and lyrics ==
"The Philosopher" is considered to be one of the simpler compositions on Individual Thought Patterns.

MetalSucks compared the song to the work of American technical death metal band Nile. The song's instrumentation incorporates the tapping and palm muting techniques. It also employs the heavy metal gallop.

Lyrically, the track is about "questioning the guidance and judgment of others," according to Loudwire.

== Legacy ==
Loudwire listed the track on the site's list of the "10 greatest death metal riffs". Revolver called the song a "behemoth-of-a-closer". In a different article, the same publication listed it as among the greatest closing tracks in heavy metal history, saying it "proved how death metal could be virtuosic, melodic and hard-hitting all at once. No one's done it better." MetalSucks called the track a "standout" on the album.

The song has been covered by several different artists, including death metal band Contrarian and heavy metal band Dååth.
