= Dying of Everything =

Studio album by Obituary
- Released: January 13, 2023
- Recorded: 2020–2022
- Studios: RedNeck Studios, Gibsonton, Florida
- Genre: Death metal
- Length: 45:00
- Label: Relapse
- Producers: Obituary, Joe Cincotta

Obituary chronology
Obituary (2017)	Dying of Everything (2023)

Dying of Everything is the eleventh studio album by American death metal band Obituary.

Music videos were made for "The Wrong Time", "Dying of Everything" and "Barely Alive".

== Reception ==
Professional ratings
Review scores
Source	Rating
Blabbermouth.net	8.5/10
Kerrang!	3/5 stars
Metal Hammer (UK)	8/10
Metal Injection	9/10
MetalSucks	4/5 stars
Rock Hard	9.0/10

With respect to the album, Blabbermouth.net stated that "these ten new songs smash, kick and slay with admirable levels of vehemence and viciousness, as if OBITUARY have reawakened the virile, fearless spirit of their younger selves".

Dan Slessor of Kerrang! indicated that "Dying Of Everything does not match or beat its predecessor, but that is not to say that it is lacking in any department, for it is a crushing slab of the dark'n'hard stuff executed with merciless precision and delivered with a killer mix".

== Track listing ==
No.	Title	Length
1.	"Barely Alive"	3:32
2.	"The Wrong Time"	4:28
3.	"Without A Conscience"	4:28
4.	"War"	4:28
5.	"Dying Of Everything"	4:43
6.	"My Will To Live"	5:20
7.	"By The Dawn"	4:35
8.	"Weaponize The Hate"	4:00
9.	"Torn Apart"	3:37
10.	"Be Warned"	5:49
Total length:		45:00

== Personnel ==
=== Obituary ===
- John Tardy – vocals, co-production, recording
- Trevor Peres – guitars, co-production, recording
- Ken Andrews Jr. – guitars, co-production, recording
- Terry Butler – bass, co-production, recording
- Donald Tardy – drums, co-production, recording

=== Additional contributors ===
- Joe Cincotta – production, mixing
- Brad Boatright – mastering
- Mariusz Lewandowski – album art
- Jacob Speis – album layout design
- David Austin – solo on "By the Dawn"
