= Obituary (album) =

Studio album by Obituary
- Released: March 17, 2017
- Recorded: 2016
- Studio: RedNeck Studios, Gibsonton, Florida
- Genre: Death metal
- Length: 33:07
- Label: Gibtown, Relapse
- Producer: Obituary

Obituary chronology
| Inked in Blood (2014) | Obituary (2017) | Dying of Everything (2023) |

Obituary is the tenth studio album by American death metal band Obituary, released on March 17, 2017.

Music videos were made for "Ten Thousand Ways To Die, "Sentence Day", "Brave".

== Reception ==
Professional ratings
Aggregate scores
| Source | Rating |
|---|---|
| Metacritic | 85/100 |
Review scores
| Source | Rating |
| Exclaim! | 8/10 |
| The Guardian | 4/5 stars |
| Metal Hammer | 4/5 stars |
| MetalSucks | 4/5 |
| Pitchfork | 7.6/10 |
| Terrorizer | 8/10 |

Obituary has received generally positive reviews from critics. MetalSucks rated it four out of five, and wrote, "The men of Obituary may seem mellow enough, as casual and personable as the most humorless extreme metal guys are considered and intense. But their shorts-and-hoodie vibe belies their poise as they walk the line between Obituary tradition and the demands of a tenth album. That this tenth album is self-titled prompts fans to expect a rebirth or definitive statement. Or possibly a final statement."

The Guardian writer Dom Lawson gave the album a rating of four stars out of five, and wrote, "Plainly intended to be definitive, their 10th album stays true to the scything, mid-paced attack that had such an impact on fledgling extreme metal in the late 80s, but in contrast to 2014's Inked in Blood, this is no perfunctory delivering of familiar goods. Latest recruits Kenny Andrews (guitar) and Terry Butler (bass) have brought renewed focus to both songwriting and sound: the former's blistering, old-school solos are uniformly stunning and Butler's chemistry with drummer Donald Tardy lifts the likes of breakneck opener Brave to levels of intensity that Obituary haven't reached for years."

Ray Harmony of Terrorizer rated it eight out of ten stars, and wrote, "There is still nobody else in the industry able to make the monstrous vocal sounds that effortlessly ooze outta John Tardy's mouth. There is still no other band that can sludge their way through swampy death riffs with as much groove as guitarist Trevor Peres and drummer Donald Tardy, with his trademark double-kicks and half-time snares. [...] Their self-titled tenth studio album is not for the fainthearted, but the brave few who're willing to brace against the bone-crushing heaviness of ten new Obituary songs, will be handsomely rewarded."

=== Accolades ===
| Publication | Accolade | Rank | Ref. |
|---|---|---|---|
| Decibel | 40 Best Albums of 2017 | 14 | |
| Loudwire | 25 Best Metal Albums of 2017 | 21 | |
| Revolver | 20 Best Albums of 2017 | 11 | |
| Rolling Stone | 20 Best Metal Albums of 2017 | 14 | |

== Track listing ==
All lyrics are written by John Tardy; all music is composed by Trevor Peres, Donald Tardy and Ken Andrews.

| No. | Title | Length |
|---|---|---|
| 1. | "Brave" | 2:14 |
| 2. | "Sentence Day" | 2:49 |
| 3. | "A Lesson in Vengeance" | 3:07 |
| 4. | "End it Now" | 4:02 |
| 5. | "Kneel Before Me" | 3:04 |
| 6. | "It Lives" | 3:24 |
| 7. | "Betrayed" | 3:01 |
| 8. | "Turned to Stone" | 4:13 |
| 9. | "Straight to Hell" | 3:57 |
| 10. | "Ten Thousand Ways to Die" | 3:16 |
| Total length: | | 33:07 |

Deluxe edition CD bonus track
| No. | Title | Length |
|---|---|---|
| 11. | "No Hope" | 3:21 |
| Total length: | | 36:28 |

== Personnel ==
=== Obituary ===
- John Tardy – vocals
- Kenny Andrews – lead guitar
- Trevor Peres – rhythm guitar
- Terry Butler – bass
- Donald Tardy – drums

=== Technical personnel ===
- Obituary – production
- Mark Prator – executive production
- Joe Cincotta – mixing
- Brad Boatright – mastering
- Andreas Marschall – cover art
- Ester Segarra – photography
- Jacob Speis – layout

== Charts ==
| Chart (2017) | Peak position |
|---|---|
| Austrian Albums (Ö3 Austria) | 21 |
| Belgian Albums (Ultratop Flanders) | 45 |
| Belgian Albums (Ultratop Wallonia) | 83 |
| Czech Albums (ČNS IFPI) | 42 |
| Dutch Albums (Album Top 100) | 67 |
| German Albums (Offizielle Top 100) | 24 |
| Swiss Albums (Schweizer Hitparade) | 34 |
| US Billboard 200 | 184 |
