= Scott Burns (music producer) =

- Genres: Death metal; industrial metal; progressive metal
- Occupations: Composer, mastering engineer, mixing engineer, producer
- Years active: 1987–1997 (Full-time); 1998–present (Part-time)

Scott Burns is an American computer engineer and a former music producer of death metal records from late 1980s and 1990s. He was crucial to the emergence of the Florida death metal scene, and has been called an "extreme metal overlord".

He has produced many records for many influential death metal bands, including Death, Deicide, Cannibal Corpse, Sepultura, Obituary, Atheist, Transmetal, Suffocation, and Cynic. He has engineered some of the top genre-defining death metal albums such as Death's Human, Suffocation's Effigy of the Forgotten, Obituary's Slowly We Rot, and Cannibal Corpse's Tomb of the Mutilated. He most recently worked on the album Frozen in Time (2005) by Obituary. Burns has since quit producing full-time to work in computer programming. He said: "Since I was young and having fun, I got pigeonholed. Which is fine, but I was just 'the death metal guy.'"

According to Jack Owen, Burns commuted an hour to Morrisound, and would often sleep in the studio or in band members' closets at their residences.

In 2023, Burns was the subject of the David E. Gehlke biography The Scott Burns Sessions: A Life in Death Metal 1987–1997, which documents his career and albums produced at Morrisound and features interviews with him and other artists involved in their creation. Following its release, Burns made a rare public appearance at the 2024 Decibel Metal and Beer Festival in Philadelphia.

== Discography ==
Year	Band	Release	Role
1987	Whiplash	Ticket to Mayhem	Engineering
1988	Death	Leprosy	Engineering
1989	Amon	Sacrificial (Demo)	Mixing
1989	The Guff	The Art of Deception (Demo)	Engineering
1989	Sepultura	Beneath the Remains	Producer, Engineering, Mixing
1989	Obituary	Slowly We Rot	Producer, Engineering, Mixing
1989	Atheist	Piece of Time	Producer, Engineering
1989	Terrorizer	World Downfall	Engineering
1989	Awake!	Beliefs (EP)	Producer, Engineering
1990	Assück	Necrosalvation (EP)	Engineering
1990	Cynic	Demo 1990	Producer, Engineering
1990	Death	Spiritual Healing	Producer, Mixing
1990	Cancer	To the Gory End	Producer, Mixing
1990	Deicide	Deicide	Producer, Engineering, Mixing
1990	Napalm Death	Harmony Corruption	Producer, Engineering, Mixing
1990	Napalm Death	Suffer the Children	Producer, Engineer, Mixing
1990	Cannibal Corpse	Eaten Back to Life	Producer, Engineering
1990	Demolition Hammer	Tortured Existence	Producer, Engineer, Mixing
1990	Obituary	Cause of Death	Producer, Engineering, Mixing
1990	Master	Master	Producer, Engineer, Mixing
1990	Atrocity	Hallucinations	Producer, Engineering, Mixing
1990	Exhorder	Slaughter in the Vatican	Producer, Engineering, Mixing
1990	Various artists	At Death's Door (A Collection of Brutal Death Metal)	Producer (tracks 1, 3, 6, 8, 9 & 12)
1990	Hellwitch	Syzygial Miscreancy	Engineering
1990	Overthrow	Within Suffering	Producer, Engineering, Mixing
1991	Cynic	Demo 1991	Producer, Engineering
1991	Acheron	Rites of the Black Mass (Demo)	Producer
1991	The Guff	Refuse to Crawl (Demo)	Producer, Engineering
1991	Skeletal Earth	Eulogy for a Dying Fetus	Producer, Engineering
1991	Sepultura	Arise	Producer, Engineering, Lyrical assistance & translation
1991	Slap of Reality	Fletch (EP)	Producer, Engineer
1991	Malevolent Creation	The Ten Commandments	Producer, Engineering, Mixing
1991	Devastation	Idolatry	Producer, Engineering, Mixing
1991	Cancer	Death Shall Rise	Producer
1991	Cannibal Corpse	Butchered at Birth	Producer, Engineering
1991	Loudblast	Disincarnate	Producer, Engineering, Mixing
1991	Massacre	From Beyond	Engineering
1991	Atheist	Unquestionable Presence	Producer
1991	Pestilence	Testimony of the Ancients	Producer, Engineering, Mixing
1991	Gorguts	Considered Dead	Producer, Engineering, Mixing
1991	Death	Human	Producer, Mixing
1991	Suffocation	Effigy of the Forgotten	Producer, Engineering, Mixing
1991	Assück	Anticapital	Producer, Engineering
1991	Master	On the Seventh Day God Created... Master	Producer, Engineering, Mixing
1992	Assück	Blindspot (EP)	Producer, Engineering
1992	Disincarnate	Soul Erosion (Demo)	Producer, Engineering, Mixing
1992	Hideous Corpse	Demented (Demo)	Mixing
1992	Sepultura	Third World Posse (EP)	Producer (track 1), Mixing (track 2)
1992	Speckmann Project	Speckmann Project	Producer
1992	The Guff	Jackass Live	Producer, Engineering
1992	No Return	Contamination Rises	N/A
1992	Acheron	Rites of the Black Mass	Producer, Engineering
1992	Obituary	The End Complete	Producer, Engineering, Mixing
1992	Deicide	Legion	Engineering, Mixing
1992	Malevolent Creation	Retribution	Producer, Engineering, Mixing
1992	Assück	State to State (EP)	Engineering
1992	Solstice	Solstice	Engineering, Mixing
1992	Cannibal Corpse	Tomb of the Mutilated	Producer, Engineering, Mixing
1993	Raped Ape	Terminal Reality (EP)	Producer, Engineering, Mixing
1993	Skeletal Earth	Dreighphuck (EP)	Producer
1993	Various artists	At Death's Door II	Producer (tracks 2, 4, 7 & 8)
1993	Resurrection	Embalmed Existence	Producer, Engineering
1993	Death	Individual Thought Patterns	Producer, Engineering
1993	Cynic	Focus	Producer, Engineering, Mixing
1993	Transmetal	El Infierno de Dante (also available as Dante's Inferno)	Producer, Mixing
1993	Loudblast	Sublime Dementia	Producer, Engineering, Mixing
1993	Hellwitch	Terraasymmetry (EP)	Engineering
1993	Loudblast	Cross the Threshold (EP)	Producer, Mixing (track 6)
1994	Skeletal Earth	Dē.ĕv'ṓ.lū'shŭn	Producer
1994	Cannibal Corpse	The Bleeding	Producer, Engineering, Mixing, Mastering
1994	Psychotic Waltz	Mosquito	Producer, Engineering, Mixing
1994	Obituary	World Demise	Producer, Engineering, Mixing
1994	KMFDM	Glory	Remixing (track 6, "Move On")
1995	Jason Rawhead	Dehumanized	Producer, Engineering
1995	Deicide	Once upon the Cross	Producer, Engineering, Mixing
1995	Suffocation	Pierced from Within	Producer, Engineering, Mixing
1995	Six Feet Under	Haunted	Producer, Engineering, Mixing
1995	Internal Bleeding	Voracious Contempt	Mixing
1996	Sean Malone	Cortlandt	Producer, Engineering
1996	Transmetal	México bárbaro	Producer, Mixing, Mastering
1996	Transmetal	El llamado de la hembra	Producer
1996	Cannibal Corpse	Vile	Producer, Engineering, Mixing
1996	Psychotic Waltz	Bleeding	Engineering
1996	Monstrosity	Millennium	Producer, Mixing
1997	Assück	Misery Index	Engineering
1997	Malevolent Creation	In Cold Blood	Producer, Engineering
1997	Sadus	Elements of Anger	Producer, Mixing, Mastering
1997	Deicide	Serpents of the Light	Producer, Engineering, Mixing
1998	Suffocation	Despise the Sun (EP)	Producer, Engineer, Mixing, Mastering
1998	KMFDM	Agogo	Remixing (track 8, "Hole in the Wall")
2003	Gordian Knot	Emergent	Producer
2005	Obituary	Frozen in Time	Producer
