= Frozen Alive =

2007 live album by Obituary

Video by Obituary
- Released: December 6, 2006 (EU), January 2, 2007 (US)
- Recorded: August 24, 2006
- Genre: Death metal
- Length: 90:00
- Label: Metal Mind Productions

Obituary chronology
Frozen in Time (2005)	Frozen Alive (2006)	Xecutioner's Return (2007)

Professional ratings
Review scores
Source	Rating
Thrash Pit	(6.3/10)

Frozen Alive is Obituary's first live DVD. It was recorded August 24, 2006 in Warsaw, Poland. It has songs from each of their albums through Frozen in Time. It also contains an interview conducted a day before the show.

== Contents ==
- Concert:
1. Intro: Rain
2. Redneck Stomp
3. On the Floor
4. Insane
5. Chopped in Half
6. Turned Inside Out
7. Dying
8. Intro
9. Internal Bleeding
10. Back to One
11. Find the Arise
12. Back Inside
13. Threatening Skies
14. By the Light
15. Intro
16. Kill for Me
17. Solid State
18. Stand Alone
19. Back from the Dead
20. Lockjaw
21. Slow Death
22. 'Til Death
23. Slowly We Rot
- The Interview

== Personnel ==
- John Tardy – vocals
- Allen West – lead guitar
- Trevor Peres – rhythm guitar
- Frank Watkins – bass
- Donald Tardy – drums
