= Left to Die =

EP by Obituary
- Released: September 16, 2008
- Recorded: 2008
- Studio: RedNeck Gibsonton, Florida
- Genre: Death metal
- Length: 20:40
- Label: Candlelight
- Producers: Mark Prator, Obituary

Obituary chronology
The Best of Obituary (2008)	Left to Die (2008)	Darkest Day (2009)

Professional ratings
Review scores
Source	Rating
About.com	3.5/5 stars
AllMusic	3/5 stars
Terrorizer	7/10 (Nov 2008)
Metal Hammer	7/10

Left to Die is an extended play by death metal band Obituary.

== Track listing ==
No.	Title	Length
1.	"Forces Realign"	4:38
2.	"Dethroned Emperor" (Celtic Frost cover)	5:03
3.	"Slowly We Rot"	4:39
4.	"Left to Die"	6:20
Total length:		20:40

== Personnel ==
=== Obituary ===
- John Tardy – vocals, production, mixing
- Donald Tardy – drums, production, mixing
- Trevor Peres – guitar, mixing
- Ralph Santolla – guitar, mixing
- Frank Watkins – bass, mixing

=== Technical personnel ===
- Mark Prator – recording, production, mixing
- Tom Morris – mastering
- Andreas Marschall – cover art
- Adrian Wear – packaging design
- Stan Vincent – business supervision
