= The Glorious Burden =

Studio album by Iced Earth
- Released: January 12, 2004
- Studio: Morrisound Studios (Tampa, Florida)
- Genres: Power metal; heavy metal; thrash metal
- Length: 78:47
- Label: SPV
- Producers: Jim Morris; Jon Schaffer

Iced Earth chronology
Tribute to the Gods (2002)	The Glorious Burden (2004)	The Blessed and the Damned (2004)

Professional ratings
Review scores
Source	Rating
AllMusic	4/5 stars

The Glorious Burden is the seventh studio album by the American heavy metal band Iced Earth. It is a concept album, which explores various moments in military history, such as the signing of the Declaration of Independence, the American Revolutionary War, and Waterloo. It also pays tribute to world events such as World War I, the World Trade Center attacks and the ravages of Attila the Hun.

The album includes a trilogy entitled Gettysburg (1863). Each of the three songs represents one day in the Battle of Gettysburg, the largest battle ever conducted in the Western Hemisphere and considered the turning point in the American Civil War.

This album features the debut of lead singer Tim "Ripper" Owens, formerly of Judas Priest. Owens, who at that time was still in Judas Priest, was asked to do the vocals as a side project. However, he joined the band full-time after Judas Priest reunited with Rob Halford. The album was first recorded with Matt Barlow on vocals, but band leader Jon Schaffer was not satisfied with his performance. Due to the events of September 11, Barlow became more interested in law enforcement than the music business, and according to Schaffer "Matt's heart was not in it and it showed in his performance." As a result, Matt left the band and the album was shelved until a new vocalist could be found. However, some of Barlow's initial recordings remain on the record as backing vocals, and he is credited with co-writing two songs.

This record is the only Iced Earth album to feature Ralph Santolla on lead guitars. This was the last studio album for bassist James MacDonough and drummer Richard Christy.

The album was released in three different formats: a limited edition two-disc version in digipak format, and single-disc American and European versions. See the track list for the differences.

"The Reckoning (Don't Tread on Me)", "Declaration Day", and the acoustic version of "When the Eagle Cries (Unplugged)" were all released as music videos.

Spin magazine called it the worst metal album of all time in a 2022 list article.

== Track listing ==
=== Limited edition digipak version ===
==== Disc one ====
No.	Title	Lyrics	Music	Length
1.	"The Star-Spangled Banner"	(instrumental)	John Stafford Smith	1:14
2.	"Declaration Day"	Jon Schaffer	Schaffer	4:59
3.	"When the Eagle Cries"	Schaffer	Schaffer	4:06
4.	"The Reckoning (Don't Tread on Me)"	Schaffer	Schaffer	4:57
5.	"Greenface"	Schaffer	Schaffer	3:03
6.	"Attila"	Matt Barlow; Schaffer	Barlow; Schaffer	5:36
7.	"Red Baron/Blue Max"	Tim Owens	Schaffer	4:05
8.	"Hollow Man"	Schaffer	Schaffer	4:25
9.	"Valley Forge"	Schaffer	Schaffer	4:46
10.	"Waterloo"	Barlow; Schaffer	Barlow; Schaffer	5:50
11.	"When the Eagle Cries (Unplugged)"	Schaffer	Schaffer	3:35

==== Disc two: Gettysburg (1863) ====
No.	Title	Lyrics	Music	Length
1.	"The Devil to Pay (July 1, 1863)" (references "When Johnny Comes Marching Home", "The Star-Spangled Banner" and "Dixie")	Schaffer	Schaffer	12:13
2.	"Hold at All Costs (July 2, 1863)"	Schaffer	Schaffer	7:06
3.	"High Water Mark (July 3, 1863)"; I. "Cannonade/Intro (instrumental)" II. "The Burden of Command"; III. "The Last Full Measure"; IV. "Charge!!"; V. "The Melee"	Schaffer	Schaffer	12:36: 1:52; 1:36; 3:26; 2:30; 3:15
Total length:				78:31

=== American version ===
No.	Title	Lyrics	Music	Length
1.	"The Star-Spangled Banner"	(instrumental)	Smith	1:14
2.	"Declaration Day"	Schaffer	Schaffer	4:59
3.	"When the Eagle Cries"	Schaffer	Schaffer	4:06
4.	"The Reckoning (Don't Tread on Me)"	Schaffer	Schaffer	4:57
5.	"Greenface"	Schaffer	Schaffer	3:03
6.	"Valley Forge"	Schaffer	Schaffer	4:46
7.	"Attila"	Barlow; Schaffer	Barlow; Schaffer	5:36
8.	"Hollow Man"	Schaffer	Schaffer	4:25
9.	"Red Baron/Blue Max"	Owens	Schaffer	4:05
10.	"The Devil to Pay (July 1, 1863)"	Schaffer	Schaffer	12:13
11.	"Hold at All Costs (July 2, 1863)"	Schaffer	Schaffer	7:06
12.	"High Water Mark (July 3, 1863); I. "Cannonade/Intro (instrumental)" II. "The Burden of Command"; III. "The Last Full Measure"; IV. "Charge!!"; V. "The Melee"	Schaffer	Schaffer	12:36: 1:52; 1:36; 3:26; 2:30; 3:15
Total length:				69:07

=== European version ===
No.	Title	Lyrics	Music	Length
1.	"Declaration Day"	Schaffer	Schaffer	4:59
2.	"When the Eagle Cries"	Schaffer	Schaffer	4:06
3.	"The Reckoning (Don't Tread on Me)"	Schaffer	Schaffer	4:57
4.	"Attila"	Barlow; Schaffer	Barlow; Schaffer	5:36
5.	"Red Baron/Blue Max"	Owens	Schaffer	4:05
6.	"Hollow Man"	Schaffer	Schaffer	4:25
7.	"Valley Forge"	Schaffer	Schaffer	4:46
8.	"Waterloo"	Barlow; Schaffer	Barlow; Schaffer	5:50
9.	"The Devil to Pay (July 1, 1863)"	Schaffer	Schaffer	12:13
10.	"Hold at All Costs (July 2, 1863)"	Schaffer	Schaffer	7:06
11.	"High Water Mark (July 3, 1863); I. "Cannonade/Intro (instrumental)" II. "The Burden of Command"; III. "The Last Full Measure"; IV. "Charge!!"; V. "The Melee"	Schaffer	Schaffer	12:36: 1:52; 1:36; 3:26; 2:30; 3:15
Total length:				70:40

== Personnel ==
Iced Earth

- Tim "Ripper" Owens − lead vocals
- Jon Schaffer − rhythm guitar, lead guitar (except on "Declaration Day", "Red Baron/Blue Max", "Hollow Man", "Valley Forge" and "When the Eagle Cries"), acoustic guitar, backing vocals; co-lead vocals (on "High Water Mark - II. The Burden of Command")
- Ralph Santolla − lead guitar (on "Declaration Day", "Red Baron/Blue Max", "Hollow Man" and "Valley Forge")
- James MacDonough − bass guitar
- Richard Christy − drums

Guest musicians

- Jim Morris − lead guitar (on "When the Eagle Cries")
- Matt Barlow − backing vocals
- Sam King − backing vocals
- Jeff Day − backing vocals
- Howard Helm − piano
- Susan McQuinn − flute, piccolo
- Michael LoBue − bagpipe
- Prague Philharmonic Orchestra − Gettysburg (1863) Trilogy

Production

- Jim Morris – producer, engineering, mastering
- Jon Schaffer – producer
- Tom Morris – mastering
- Leo Hao – illustrations
- Travis Smith – layout
