= The End Complete =

Studio album by Obituary
- Released: April 21, 1992
- Recorded: October–November 1991
- Studio: Morrisound Recording, Tampa, Florida
- Genre: Death metal
- Length: 36:17
- Label: R/C
- Producer: Scott Burns, Obituary

Obituary chronology
Cause of Death (1990)	The End Complete (1992)	World Demise (1994)

Professional ratings
Review scores
Source	Rating
AllMusic	4.5/5 stars
Collector's Guide to Heavy Metal	6/10
Hit Parader	4/5 stars
Metal Forces	90/100

The End Complete is the third album by American death metal band Obituary, released on April 21, 1992, through R/C Records.

== Background ==
The album marked the return of guitarist Allen West who performed on the debut album. This is their first of four consecutive albums with the full classic lineup of the Tardy Brothers, Peres, West and Watkins. A music video was made for the title track.

== Reception and legacy ==
The End Complete is Obituary's best-selling album, with over 100,000 copies sold in the U.S. and more than 250,000 worldwide. It reached No. 16 on Billboard's Top Heatseekers chart. Additionally, the band's new logo introduced on The End Complete is the best-selling shirt print in the history of Roadrunner Records.

== Track listing ==
All lyrics are written by John Tardy.

No.	Title	Music	Length
1.	"I'm in Pain"	Trevor Peres, Donald Tardy	4:01
2.	"Back to One"	Allen West, Donald Tardy	3:42
3.	"Dead Silence"	West, Donald Tardy	3:21
4.	"In the End of Life"	Peres, Donald Tardy	3:41
5.	"Sickness"	Peres, Donald Tardy	4:06
6.	"Corrosive"	Peres, Donald Tardy	4:11
7.	"Killing Time"	West, Donald Tardy	3:59
8.	"The End Complete"	Peres, Donald Tardy	4:03
9.	"Rotting Ways"	West, Donald Tardy	5:13
Total length:			36:17

Bonus Tracks 1997 Roadrunner Remasters
No.	Title	Music	Length
10.	"I'm In Pain" (Live)	Peres, Donald Tardy	4:49
11.	"Killing Time" (Live)	West, Donald Tardy	4:01

== Personnel ==
=== Obituary ===
- John Tardy – vocals, production
- Allen West – lead guitar, production
- Trevor Peres – rhythm guitar, production
- Frank Watkins – bass, production
- Donald Tardy – drums, production, mixing

=== Technical personnel ===
- Scott Burns – production, engineering, mixing
- Brian Benscoter – assistant engineering
- Mark Prator – assistant engineering
- Jeff Daniel – reissue production
- Chris Gehringer – remastering
- Andreas Marschall – cover illustrations
- Rene Miville – photos
- Mark Leialoha – photos
- Rob Mayworth – original logo design
- Satoshi Kobayashi – reissue design

== Trivia ==
- Interested in industrial music, Trevor Peres suggested the use of drum machines for the album, but the other band members did not agree. This refusal led him to form Meathook Seed.
