= Frank Watkins (musician) =

Musical artist (1968–2015)

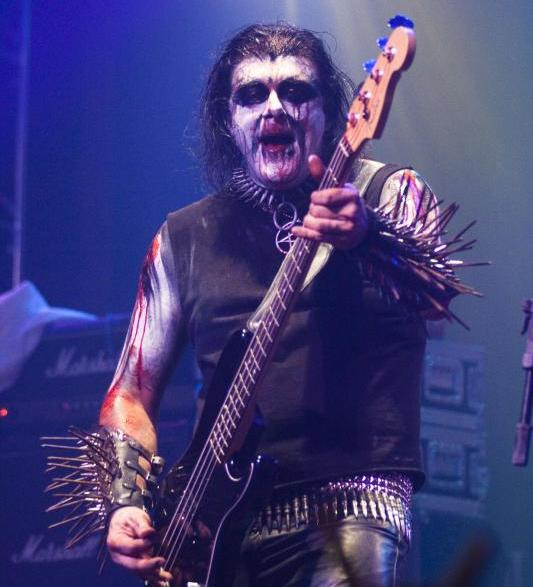
- Watkins performing with Gorgoroth as "Bøddel". Photo by Alexandre Cardoso.

Background information
- Also known as: Bøddel
- Born: February 19, 1968; United States
- Died: October 18, 2015 (aged 47)
- Genres: Death metal, black metal
- Occupation: Musician
- Instrument(s): Bass guitar, guitar
- Years active: 1986-2015
- Formerly of: Obituary, Gorgoroth
- Website: www.obituary.cc www.gorgoroth.info

Frank Watkins (February 19, 1968 – October 18, 2015) was an American heavy metal musician best known as a former, long-time bass player for the death metal band Obituary; he played with them from 1989 to 1997 and then from 2003 until 2010. He had been the bass player of the Norwegian black metal band Gorgoroth at the time of his death, where he had been known as Bøddel.

== Biography ==
Watkins was born in 1968. He began playing music at the age of 12 and started his professional career in 1986, before joining Obituary in 1989. He played on every Obituary release until his departure from the band in 2010, with the exception of their debut album Slowly We Rot (1989).

Watkins prided himself not only on the technical side of his music, but also on the business aspect, managing, mentoring, and guiding other bands and musicians. He formed his management company, Back From the Dead Productions, in 2007 to help bands create a positive impact in their musical careers. In late 2007, Watkins became the bassist of Norwegian black metal band Gorgoroth, and in 2009 he participated in the recording of the Gorgoroth album Quantos Possunt ad Satanitatem Trahunt. He debuted live with the band at the Hole in the Sky festival in Bergen on August 29, 2009. This was the first concert Gorgoroth had performed since September 2007. In an interview with Metal Maniacs published online in August 2009, Watkins explained that for his work with Gorgoroth he had taken the stage name "Bøddel", which means "Executioner" in Norwegian.

Watkins died from an undisclosed type of cancer on October 18, 2015. He was 47 years old.

== Bands ==
- Sacrosanct (1985–1986)
- Bad Rep (1986–1987)
- Hellwitch (1987–1989)
- The Henchmen (1993)
- Obituary (1989–1997, 2003–2010)
- Gorgoroth (2007–2015)

== Discography ==
=== Obituary ===
- Cause of Death (1990)
- The End Complete (1992)
- World Demise (1994)
- Don't Care (Single) (1994)
- Back from the Dead (1997)
- Dead (Live Album) (1998)
- Anthology (Compilation Album) (2001)
- Frozen in Time (2005)
- Frozen Alive (Live DVD) (2006)
- Xecutioner's Return (2007)
- Left to Die (EP) (2008)
- Live Xecution - Party.San 2008 (Live DVD) (2009)
- Darkest Day (2009)

=== Gorgoroth ===
- Quantos Possunt ad Satanitatem Trahunt (2009)
- Instinctus Bestialis (2015)
