= Back from the Dead (Obituary album) =

Studio album by Obituary
- Released: April 22, 1997
- Recorded: 1996 at Criteria Recording, Miami, Florida
- Genre: Death metal
- Length: 38:47
- Label: Roadrunner
- Producers: Jaime Locke and Obituary

Obituary chronology
World Demise (1994)	Back from the Dead (1997)	Dead (1998)

Professional ratings
Review scores
Source	Rating
AllMusic	2.5/5 stars
Collector's Guide to Heavy Metal	6/10

Back from the Dead is the fifth album by American death metal band Obituary. It was released on April 22, 1997. This was the band's final album before their five-year breakup from 1998 to 2003.

== Overview ==
Back from the Dead is noted for being Obituary's most diverse and experimental album. While keeping their death metal roots intact, it saw the band incorporate elements of groove metal, hardcore punk, and in particular, its bonus track "Bullituary" is played in a rap/nu metal style. Regarding the album's musical direction, frontman John Tardy recalls: "We took a more raw approach with that album. We used a new producer Jaime Locke on that record. We really like the NY Hardcore sound and those influences came out on that record. I love the album really in your face. Also my friends Skinner T and #1 Diablo did some rapping on it."

Back from the Dead was the first Obituary album not produced by longtime contributor Scott Burns. Some copies of the album also include an additional CD-ROM Data containing videos, live footage and animation.

== Track listing ==
All tracks written and composed by Obituary, unless otherwise stated.

No.	Title	Length
1.	"Threatening Skies"	2:19
2.	"By the Light"	2:55
3.	"Inverted"	2:53
4.	"Platonic Disease"	4:06
5.	"Download"	2:45
6.	"Rewind"	4:03
7.	"Feed on the Weak"	4:15
8.	"Lockdown"	4:11
9.	"Pressure Point"	2:25
10.	"Back from the Dead"	5:12
Total length:		35:04

Bonus track
No.	Title	Music	Length
11.	"Bullituary (Remix)" (featuring DJ's Diablo D and Skinner T)	Obituary/Diablo D/Skinner T	3:43
Total length:			38:47

== Personnel ==
- John Tardy - vocals
- Allen West - lead guitar
- Trevor Peres - rhythm guitar, CD-ROM bonus data
- Frank Watkins - bass
- Donald Tardy - drums
