= World Demise =

Studio album by Obituary
- Released: September 6, 1994
- Recorded: 1993–1994 at Morrisound Recording, Tampa, Florida
- Genre: Death metal
- Length: 50:57
- Label: Roadrunner
- Producer: Scott Burns and Obituary

Obituary chronology
| The End Complete (1992) | World Demise (1994) | Back from the Dead (1997) |

Singles from World Demise
- 1. "Don't Care" Released: 1994

Professional ratings
Review scores
| Source | Rating |
|---|---|
| AllMusic | 3/5 stars |
| Collector's Guide to Heavy Metal | 7/10 |

World Demise is the fourth album by American death metal band Obituary. It was released on September 6, 1994. A music video was made for the track "Don't Care".

== Production ==
Of note, World Demise was the last album recorded with long-time producer Scott Burns until Frozen in Time.

== Musical style ==
While remaining, at the core, a death metal band, there's definite changes in Obituary's overall sound. World Demise has, in general, a slower pace and more groove-oriented beats. The band also increased the use of sampling.

== Track listing ==
- All songs written and arranged by Obituary.

| No. | Title | Length |
|---|---|---|
| 1. | "Don't Care" | 3:08 |
| 2. | "World Demise" | 3:43 |
| 3. | "Burned In" | 3:32 |
| 4. | "Redefine" | 4:39 |
| 5. | "Paralyzing" | 4:57 |
| 6. | "Lost" | 3:59 |
| 7. | "Solid State" | 4:38 |
| 8. | "Splattered" | 4:15 |
| 9. | "Final Thoughts" | 4:08 |
| 10. | "Boiling Point" | 3:09 |
| 11. | "Set in Stone" | 4:50 |
| 12. | "Kill for Me" | 5:59 |
| Total length: | | 50:57 |

Bonus Tracks 1998 Roadrunner Remasters
| No. | Title | Length |
|---|---|---|
| 13. | "Killing Victims Found" | 5:05 |
| 14. | "Infected [Live]" | 5:00 |
| 15. | "Godly Beings [Live]" | 2:01 |
| 16. | "Body Bag [Live]" | 5:59 |
| Total length: | | 1:07:22 |

== Personnel ==
- John Tardy - vocals
- Allen West - lead guitar
- Trevor Peres - rhythm guitar
- Frank Watkins - bass
- Donald Tardy - drums
