= Cause of Death (album) =

Studio album by Obituary
- Released: September 19, 1990
- Recorded: 1990
- Studios: Morrisound Recording, Tampa, Florida
- Genre: Death metal
- Length: 41:02
- Label: Roadrunner
- Producers: Scott Burns, Obituary

Obituary chronology
Slowly We Rot (1989)	Cause of Death (1990)	The End Complete (1992)

Professional ratings
Review scores
Source	Rating
AllMusic	3.5/5 stars
Collector's Guide to Heavy Metal	7/10
Select	3/5 medals

Cause of Death is the second album by Florida death metal band Obituary, released on September 19, 1990, through Roadrunner Records.

The album was recorded at Morrisound Recording in Tampa, Florida and was produced by Scott Burns.

The album's sound has drawn comparisons to Celtic Frost and Hellhammer. Lyrical themes include graphic violence.

Along with Slowly We Rot, Cause of Death is considered a landmark in the death metal genre.

== Background and promotion ==
The album was recorded at Morrisound Recording in Tampa, Florida and was produced by Scott Burns.

Obituary went on tour in the United States to support Cause of Death in November 1990 together with label mates Sepultura as headliner and Sadus, starting in Florida. They continued their tour activities in Europe in mid-1991.

== Music ==
The album has been described as "gore-infested." John Tardy's vocal performance on the album has been characterized as "senseless gurgles." Cause of Death contains a cover of Celtic Frost's "Circle of the Tyrants".

Joe DiVita of Loudwire said: "In a highly competitive year as death metal continued to explode, Obituary immediately distanced themselves from the crop, taking obvious influence from Celtic Frost and Hellhammer. Opting out of blast beats entirely, Cause of Death was predicated on oozing riffs, erratic structures and the swamp-born guttural belch of John Tardy."

According to Alternative Press Magazine: "No matter what some death-metal purists think, Obituary embraced elements of hardcore very early in their career. Cause Of Death takes a turn away from the full-bore speed of most death-metal bands with a slow, groove-oriented approach to brutality."

== Artwork ==
The artwork was done by artist Michael Whelan. It is their first release with longtime member Frank Watkins on bass, and also their first and only album with guitarist James Murphy, previously of Death. Murphy did not contribute to the songwriting as the riffs he showed to the band would end up appearing on Disincarnate's Dreams of the Carrion Kind.

The cover art of this album was used in an H. P. Lovecraft collection, Lovecraft's Nightmare A. It was intended to be used as the cover artwork of Sepultura's album Beneath the Remains which released the year before Cause of Death. However, Roadrunner Records sent the original album cover of Beneath the Remains to Obituary. Monte Conner of Roadrunner forced Sepultura to use another Michael Whelan illustration for Beneath the Remains, Nightmare in Red. The second portion of the painting, Lovecraft's Nightmare B was used by Demolition Hammer for their 1992 album Epidemic of Violence. The incident with Sepultura led to Igor Cavalera becoming upset with Monte Conner, with Cavalera notably having a tattoo of some of the cover on his arm.

== Legacy ==
Cause of Death is considered a classic album in the history of death metal. Obituary played Cause of Death in its entirety at the 2019 Decibel Metal & Beer Fest in Philadelphia, Pennsylvania. Celtic Frost frontman Tom G. Warrior has endorsed the cover of "Circle of Tyrants". Chris Krovatin of Kerrang! said, "On their sophomore effort, [Obituary’s] hard work and patience paid off in the form of one of the most gut-wrenching, joint-twisting albums ever written. [...] Cause Of Death is an awesome, brooding journey to the heart of death metal’s development, and one that sums up the fertile burial ground of the 1990s. Only in Florida."

Alternative Press Magazine observed the album's influence within the deathcore movement.

In 2025, Joe DiVita of Loudwire named the album as the best death metal release of 1990. "Every track is a standout, but 'Chopped in Half' serves as the quintessential song from death metal’s perennial cavemen."

== Track listing ==
All lyrics are written by John Tardy, except where noted; all music is composed by Trevor Peres and Donald Tardy, except where noted.

No.	Title	Lyrics	Music	Length
1.	"Infected"			5:34
2.	"Body Bag"			5:49
3.	"Chopped in Half"			3:43
4.	"Circle of the Tyrants" (Celtic Frost cover)	T. G. Warrior	T. G. Warrior	4:25
5.	"Dying"			4:29
6.	"Find the Arise"			2:51
7.	"Cause of Death"		Allen West, Peres	5:38
8.	"Memories Remain"			3:44
9.	"Turned Inside Out"			4:57

The Obituary Remasters 1997 Bonus Tracks
No.	Title	Length
10.	"Infected" (Demo Version)	4:16
11.	"Memories Remain" (Demo Version)	3:34
12.	"Chopped in Half" (Demo Version)	3:45
Total length:		52:37

== Personnel ==
=== Obituary ===
- John Tardy – vocals
- James Murphy – lead guitar
- Trevor Peres – rhythm guitar
- Frank Watkins – bass
- Donald Tardy – drums

=== Technical personnel ===
- Obituary – production
- Scott Burns – production, engineering, mixing
- Jeff Daniel – 1997 reissue production
- George Marino – 1997 remastering
- Ponkiesbergh – 1997 design
- Kent Smith – sound effects
- Michael Whelan – cover, illustration
- Rob Mayworth – band logo design
- Carole Segal – back cover photo
- Shaun Clark – 1997 photo
- Tim Hubbard – 1997 photo
- Phil Alexander – 1997 liner notes
