= Allen West (musician) =

American death metal guitarist

- Born: October 17, 1967 (age 58); Brandon, Florida, U.S.
- Genres: Death metal; death 'n' roll
- Occupation: Musician
- Instrument: Guitar
- Years active: 1983–present
- Formerly of: Obituary; Massacre; Six Feet Under

Allen West (born October 17, 1967) is an American musician who has been the guitarist for the death metal bands Massacre, Obituary, Six Feet Under, Lowbrow, Corpse Rot, and Southwicked. He is considered to be a pioneering figure of the death metal genre in the 1980s.

== Musical career ==
West formed the band Massacre in 1983, while he was still in high school. West's second band was Xecutioner, which laid down the foundation of Obituary.

West formed Six Feet Under with vocalist Chris Barnes of Cannibal Corpse in 1993. Initially a side project for Barnes, it became a full-time band in early 1995 after his departure from Cannibal Corpse. West remained with the band until late 1997, recording two albums and an EP in his tenure. In 1998 West formed Lowbrow band. It was announced in January 2009 that Lowbrow has decided to disband at the conclusion of their European tour. He has been in the band Southwicked ever since.

== Personal life ==
West has one son and resides in Florida.

=== Legal issues ===
He was first arrested on March 3, 2000, for domestic violence and on April 4 of that same year, after soliciting another to commit prostitution. On October 19, 2005, West made his first DUI offense. None of these incidents, however, lead to his imprisonment.

On May 16, 2007, he was arrested and imprisoned after his fifth DUI offense, incarcerated at the Gainesville Correctional Institution and released on January 19, 2008.

In late March 2013, West was arrested for producing methamphetamine in his own home. He was sentenced to one year, 3 months, and 15 days in prison on July 16, 2013, but was released April 20, 2014, having served less than nine months of his sentence.

On February 27, 2015, West was arrested in Sumter County Florida for petty theft. The case went to trial in May 2016, and as it was his third conviction he was sentenced to three years, ultimately being released October 7, 2018, having served two years and eight months.

One year after being released, he was arrested again, in Citrus County Florida on December 18, 2019, due to felony petty theft for the fourth time and misdemeanor resisting a merchant.

At 52 years old, having a sequence of legal troubles throughout his life, on October 6, 2020, West was arrested once more, in Sumter County, Florida, facing a series of concurrent sentences, which included probation violation and heroin and methamphetamine possession.

== Discography ==
Obituary

- Slowly We Rot (1989)
- The End Complete (1992)
- World Demise (1994)
- Back from the Dead (1997)
- Frozen in Time (2005)
- Frozen Alive (DVD) (2007)

Six Feet Under

- Haunted (1995)
- Alive and Dead (1996)
- Warpath (1997)

Lowbrow

- Victims at Play (2000)
- Sex, Death, Violence (2003)

Southwicked

- Death's Crown (2011)
