= Slowly We Rot =

Studio album by Obituary
- Released: 1989
- Recorded: 1988 (tracks 1–8) – March 1989 (tracks 9–12)
- Studios: Morrisound, Tampa, Florida
- Genre: Death metal
- Length: 35:09
- Label: R/C
- Producer: Scott Burns

Obituary chronology
Slowly We Rot (1989)	Cause of Death (1990)

Slowly We Rot is the debut studio album by American death metal band Obituary, released on in 1989 through R/C Records.

The album was recorded at Morrisound Recording in Tampa, Florida, and was produced by Scott Burns.

It is the only Obituary release to feature bassist Daniel Tucker. Lead guitarist Allen West would leave soon after but returned for the third album, The End Complete (1992). It was re-released on January 27, 1997, with remastered audio and liner notes. A live version of the album Slowly We Rot: Live & Rotting was recorded in October 2020 and released in August 2022 by Relapse Records.

Slowly We Rot is widely considered to be a landmark album in the development of the death metal genre, and one of the first death metal albums ever recorded due to its guttural vocals, "breakneck speed", double bass drumming and blast beats. It was considered to be a further development in the style set forth by bands like Death and Possessed. The album's music was considered to be "slower" and "groovier" than other death metal bands of the time.

== Music ==
Music journalist T Coles described Slowly We Rot as "the sound of being smashed to pieces by hammers, dropping the scalpel precision in favour of blunt trauma" as well as "a remorseless assault against the senses and body." The album has also been described as "more grounded" than some of the band's contemporaries, such as Morbid Angel.

The album has been said to have taken elements from early extreme metal bands Death and Possessed "to a new level of deathliness." Jason Birchmeier of AllMusic said, "The music of Obituary wasn't simply an extreme form of Slayer-esque speed metal with ghastly vocals; it was full-fledged death metal."

Slowly We Rot is considered to be one of the band's heavier efforts, and was considered to be a "slower, groovier" take on death metal in 1989. The album's guitars are tuned to E Standard. The album is noted for its tempo changes and sections that have been described as "doomy". John Tardy's vocal performance on the album has been characterized by his "painful-sounding" death growls and "moans". Scott Burns' production on the album has been called "downright lo-fi." Birchmeier assessed that the album's mix "[lacked] the high highs and low lows that would later become his trademark."

== Reception and legacy ==
Professional ratings
Review scores
Source	Rating
AllMusic	4/5 stars
NME	7/10
Sounds	4.5/5 stars

Slowly We Rot remains a staple essential album of both death metal and in the band's discography, and has been noted for its innovations in extreme metal. Jason Birchmeier of AllMusic wrote, "If death metal first came to life during the mid- to late '80s courtesy of bands like Florida's Death [...] Obituary, brought it to fruition in 1989 with Slowly We Rot. [...] These innovations don't seem so revolutionary now, given the innumerable death metal bands that arose during the '90s and beyond [...] But in 1989, Obituary were blazing a new trail, along with other Florida peers like Morbid Angel and, a bit later, Deicide, Malevolent Creation, and Cannibal Corpse."

== Track listing ==
All lyrics by John Tardy

No.	Title	Length
1.	"Internal Bleeding"	3:01
2.	"Godly Beings"	1:55
3.	"'Til Death"	3:56
4.	"Slowly We Rot"	3:36
5.	"Immortal Visions"	2:25
6.	"Gates to Hell"	2:49
7.	"Words of Evil"	1:55
8.	"Suffocation"	2:35
9.	"Intoxicated"	4:40
10.	"Deadly Intentions"	2:09
11.	"Bloodsoaked"	3:11
12.	"Stinkupuss"	2:59
Total length:		35:09

Bonus tracks 1997 Roadrunner Remasters
No.	Title	Length
13.	"Find the Arise" (Demo)	2:39
14.	"Like the Dead" (Demo)	2:34

Slowly We Rot: Live & Rotting (2022)
No.	Title	Length
1.	"Intro" (Live)	2:12
2.	"Internal Bleeding" (Live)	2:28
3.	"Godly Beings" (Live)	2:01
4.	"'Til Death" (Live)	4:30
5.	"Immortal Visions" (Live)	2:35
6.	"Gates to Hell" (Live)	3:35
7.	"Words of Evil" (Live)	2:28
8.	"Suffocation" (Live)	2:39
9.	"Intoxicated" (Live)	4:51
10.	"Deadly Intentions" (Live)	2:33
11.	"Bloodsoaked" (Live)	3:24
12.	"Stinkupuss" (Live)	2:46
13.	"Slowly We Rot" (Live)	6:03
14.	"Redneck Stomp" (Live)	3:31
15.	"Dethroned Emperor" (Live)	4:44
16.	"A Dying World" (Live)	2:21

== Personnel ==
Obituary

- John Tardy – vocals
- Allen West – lead guitar
- Trevor Peres – rhythm guitar
- Daniel Tucker – bass
- Donald Tardy – drums, percussion
- JP Chartier – lead guitar on tracks 13 and 14
- Jerome Grable – bass on tracks 13 and 14

Production

- Executive producer: Monte Conner
- Arranged by Obituary
- Produced, recorded & engineered by Scott Burns
- Mixed by Scott Burns, Donald Tardy & John Tardy
- Mastered by Mike Fuller

== See also ==
- Florida death metal
- Morrisound Recording
