= Obituary (band) =

American death metal band

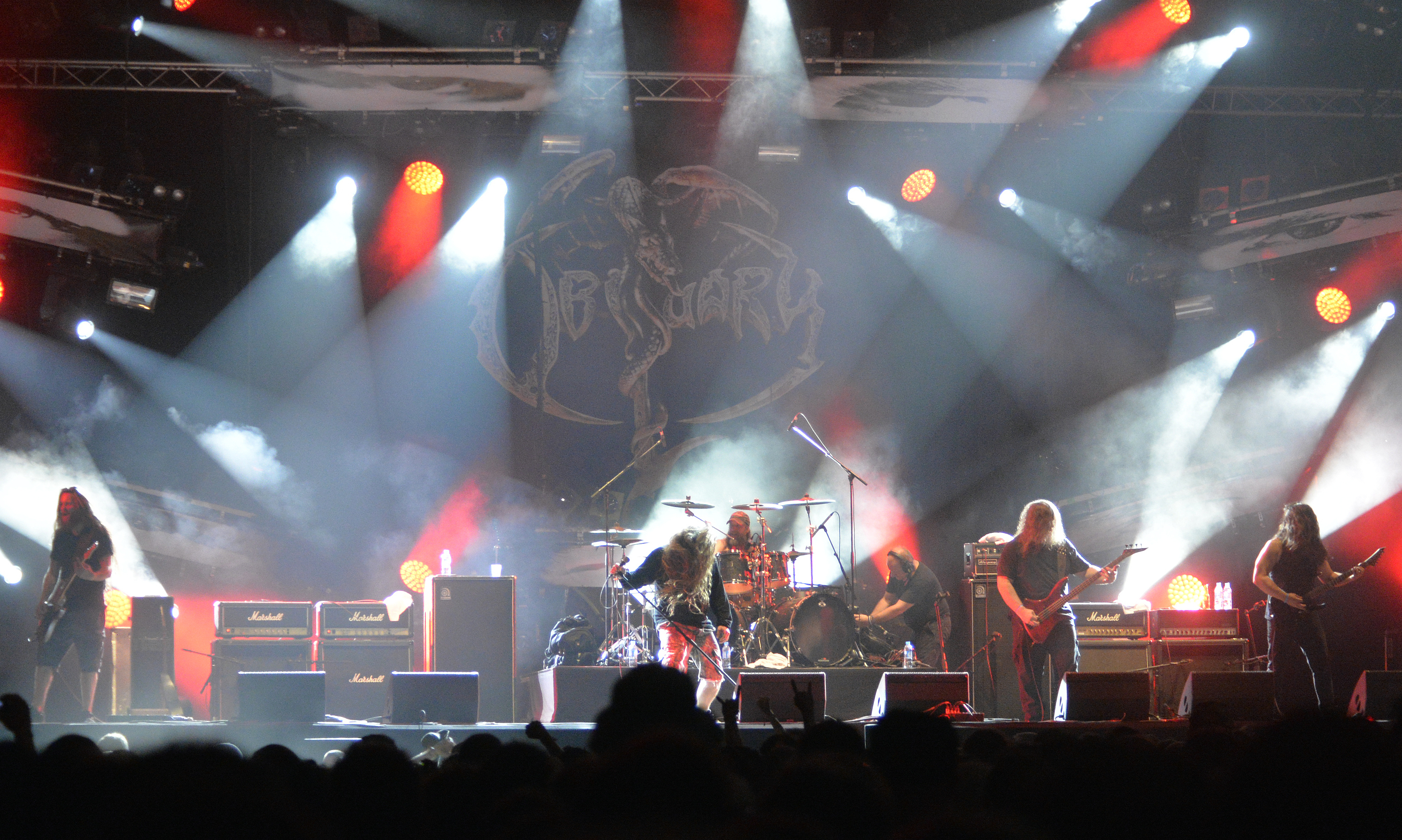
- Obituary at Hellfest 2017

Background information
- Also known as: Executioner (1984–1986); Xecutioner (1986–1988)
- Origin: Tampa, Florida, U.S.
- Genre: Death metal
- Works: Discography
- Years active: 1984–1998; 2003–present
- Labels: Relapse; Candlelight; Roadrunner
- Members: John Tardy; Donald Tardy; Trevor Peres; Terry Butler; Ken Andrews
- Past members: Allen West; Daniel Tucker; James Murphy; Frank Watkins; Ralph Santolla
- Website: obituary.cc

Obituary is an American death metal band, formed in Tampa, Florida in 1984. Initially called Executioner, they were fundamental in the development of the death metal genre, and are one of the genre's most successful bands of all-time. Obituary has released eleven studio albums and, with the exception of a five-year hiatus from 1998 to 2003, they continue to perform live.

Obituary's current lineup consists of vocalist John Tardy, drummer Donald Tardy, rhythm guitarist Trevor Peres, bassist Terry Butler, and lead guitarist Ken Andrews. The band has gone through several lineup changes. The Tardy brothers and Peres are the only constant members.

== History ==
=== Early career (1984–1990) ===
Founded as Executioner in Tampa, Florida in 1984, they dropped the "E" from their name after discovering another band of the same name, becoming Xecutioner. The band's first lineup consisted of John Tardy (lead vocals), Donald Tardy (drums), Trevor Peres (rhythm guitar), Jerome Grable (bass), and Jerry Tidwell (lead guitar). The band was inspired by Hellhammer/Celtic Frost, Iron Maiden, Judas Priest, Slayer, Savatage, Nasty Savage, and bands in the then-burgeoning Florida death metal scene: Death and Morbid Angel. The band released demos between 1985 and 1987 (the 1985 demo as Executioner and the 1986 and 1987 demos as Xecutioner). They made their vinyl debut in 1987 with the tracks "Find the Arise" and "Like the Dead" on the Raging Death compilation.

After the release of the compilation, bassist Grable was replaced by Daniel Tucker and guitarist Tidwell was replaced by Allen West. The following year, before the release of the band's debut album, Slowly We Rot (1989), they changed their name to Obituary. Soon after the release of the album, Tucker and West quit the band and were respectively replaced by Frank Watkins and former Death guitarist James Murphy. This new lineup recorded the band's second album, Cause of Death, released on September 19, 1990, and often considered one of the most important death metal albums of all time. Obituary supported Cause of Death with its first world tour, first North America with Sacred Reich and Forced Entry, Europe with Demolition Hammer and Morgoth, and then North America again with Sepultura and Sadus.

=== Rise to success (1991–1997) ===
In 1991, prior to writing and recording their third album, Murphy left Obituary to join Cancer and was replaced by a returning Allen West. The lineup of Peres, Watkins, West and the Tardy brothers recorded the band's next three albums, starting with The End Complete (1992). The End Complete was a moderate success. Selling more than a hundred thousand copies, it was the band's first album to chart in the United States and Europe. This success resulted in the release of Obituary's first-ever music video, "The End Complete", which received significant airplay on MTV's Headbangers Ball, and the band toured behind the album in over year (including headlining the Complete Control Tour with Cannibal Corpse, Malevolent Creation and Agnostic Front), going from playing clubs to theaters and arenas.

Obituary's fourth studio album, World Demise, was released in 1994. Although the album did not sell as well as The End Complete, it reached the top 100 in several territories, including the United States, United Kingdom, Germany, Switzerland and the Netherlands, and a music video for "Don't Care" was shot. In support of World Demise, the band toured North America with Napalm Death and Machine Head, and Europe with Pitchshifter and Eyehategod.

After a two-and-a-half year break, Obituary released their fifth studio album, Back from the Dead, in 1997. While the band did not abandon the death metal sound of their previous albums, Back from the Dead is noted as Obituary's most diverse record, incorporating groove metal, hardcore punk, and rap/nu metal in its closing track, "Bullituary". Regarding the album's musical direction, John Tardy said, "We took a more raw approach with that album. We used a new producer Jaime Locke on that record. We really like the NY Hardcore sound and those influences came out on that record. I love the album really in your face. Also my friends Skinner T and #1 Diablo did some rapping on it."

=== Breakup and comeback (1998–2014) ===
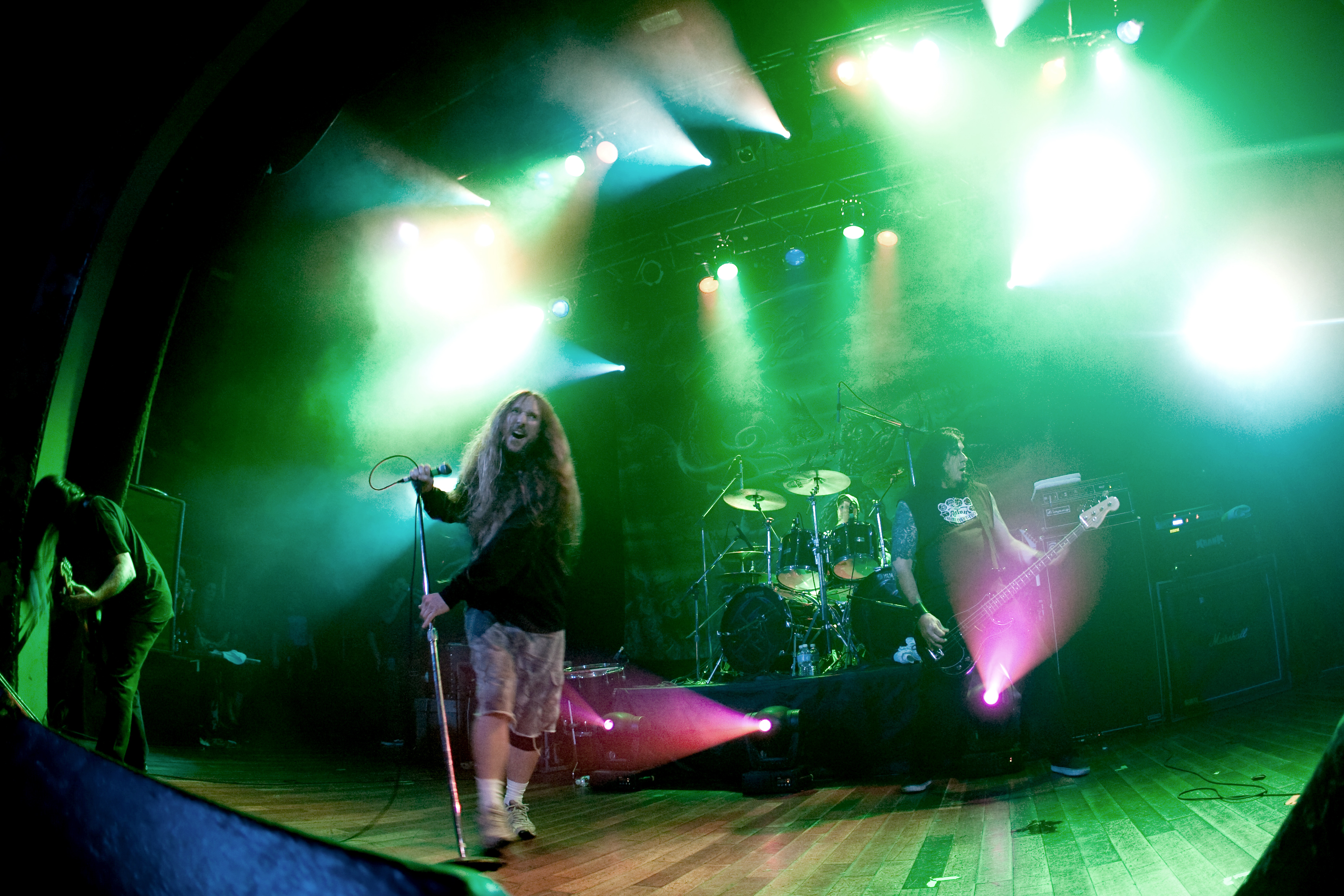
Obituary in 2009

By 1998, Obituary had disbanded due to touring exhaustion, lack of label support, and its band members getting jobs and raising families. John Tardy said, "We stopped because there were a lot of politics in the band at the time. We were spending more than we were making, the label stopped supporting us and we were all getting older and for the first time in our lives realized this wasn't going to last forever. So we all had different opinions about our band." Guitarist Trevor Peres later claimed that one of the reasons Obituary broke up was because they "had been together since we were teenagers, and then all of a sudden it turned into a professional thing and we were touring and for like 10 years we didn't live like normal people, we were like animals, like monkeys in a cage."

Following Obituary's breakup, Donald Tardy played in Andrew W.K.'s touring band (during W.K.'s appearance on Saturday Night Live Tardy wore an Obituary shirt). Allen West focused on his two projects, Lowbrow and Six Feet Under. Trevor Peres formed Catastrophic in 2001, which released the album The Cleansing that same year. Obituary reformed in 2003 and Catastrophic continued to exist alongside the reformed Obituary. A reunion album, Frozen in Time, was released in 2005. The band's first live DVD, Frozen Alive, was released in January 2007.

Obituary signed with Candlelight Records for its next three releases, Xecutioner's Return (2007), Darkest Day (2009), and the EP Left to Die (2008). A concert DVD release was announced for January 2010. Since 2012, the band has been involved with the promotion of a social networking site called Unation. Donald Tardy began a Cat Sanctuary organization called Metal Meowlisha, which practices "trap-neuter-vaccinate-return", and cares for 25 cat colonies (200 cats).

In April 2010, Obituary began work on new material for their ninth studio album, Inked in Blood, which was not released until 2014. It was the first Obituary album without bassist Frank Watkins since their 1989 debut album, Slowly We Rot. On August 2, 2013, the band launched a Kickstarter campaign to raise $10,000.00 to record and release their ninth album independently. They met their goal on August 3. When interviewed by metal webzine All About the Rock, John Tardy said of the Kickstarter campaign, "This campaign has been awesome and just confirms again what we already know and that is that we have the greatest fans in the world. We are using Kickstarter to raise enough money to release an album on our own. This is not a bash against record companies, it is just what we want to do. Years ago this would not even be a thought, but today we feel everything is in place for us, for better or worse, give it a shot." Though the band raised enough money for self-release, they were still signed to Relapse Records and partnered with the label for distribution of Inked In Blood, their first Relapse release.

=== Death of Frank Watkins, Obituary and Dying of Everything (2015–present) ===
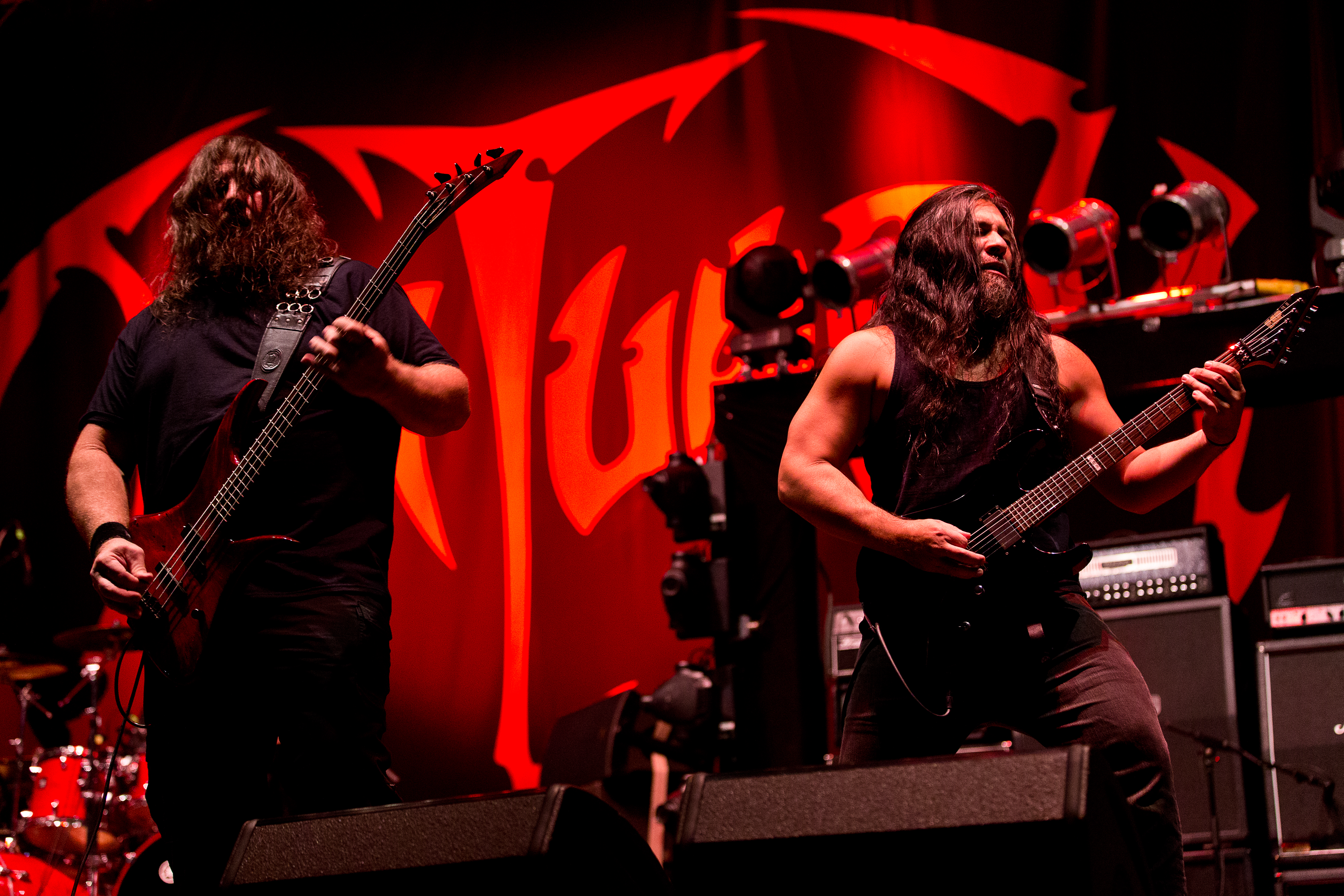
Obituary at Party.San Metal Open Air in 2016

Obituary toured Europe with Carcass, Napalm Death, Voivod and Herod during the fall of 2015. On October 18, 2015, former Obituary bassist Frank Watkins died from cancer.

On August 24, 2016, Obituary streamed the song "Loathe", a B-side to their then-upcoming single "Ten Thousand Ways to Die", released on October 21. The band released its self-titled tenth studio album on March 17, 2017. A month before release, the band released the song "No", which appeared on Decibel magazine's flexi disc series.

In November and December 2018, Obituary toured European as part of Slayer's farewell tour, featuring Lamb of God and Anthrax. When asked in a June 2018 interview about the next Obituary album, drummer Donald Tardy said, "We're always thinking about new songs and writing riffs and this and that. But at this time of our lives and this time of the music industry… This new album has only been out for just over a year now, so we're in no hurry to try and push another album out of us as quick as we can; there's no sense." In an August 2020 interview with Australia's Riff Crew, Donald Tardy revealed that, during the pandemic, Obituary had been working on a "monster" album planned for release in 2021. The band had planned to tour in 2021, specifically Europe, in support of the record. In a March 2021 interview with France's United Rock Nations, vocalist John Tardy reiterated his brother's comments, saying that Obituary had been working on new material during the COVID-19 pandemic, and added that their new album would be released in 2022, with a tour to follow. On November 10, 2022, Obituary released lead single "The Wrong Time" from their then-upcoming eleventh studio album Dying of Everything, released on January 13, 2023. The band headlined a North American tour during the spring of 2023 with Immolation, Blood Incantation, and Ingrown as support. This tour included an appearance at Milwaukee Metal Fest in May.

The band performed at the Sonic Temple music festival in Columbus, Ohio in May 2025. They played Maryland Deathfest that year. An Obituary box set, Godly Beings, was released on July 18, 2025 through Dissonance Productions. It includes the band's first four albums with bonus tracks, and is "complimented with the addition of liner notes from writer David Gehlke, who has written Turned Inside Out, the official biography of Obituary" and "four reproduction postcards featuring classic images of the band."

Obituary is currently working on a new album, which, according to bassist Terry Butler, could be released in 2026 or 2027.

The band announced US tour dates for March 2026, with Intoxicated and Castrator supporting. Acid Bath was set to appear on two dates of this tour. The band was schedueld to return to Milwaukee Metal Fest in June 2026.

== Musical style ==
Obituary's music is based on heavy groove guitar and drum riffs along with John Tardy's growling vocals, creating one of the signature sounds of death metal. Obituary played material that was described as "slower, catchier" on the albums The End Complete and World Demise. Jon Wiederhorn of Loudwire wrote that the band "were less musically adept than Morbid Angel or Death, so they downplayed whirlwind tempos for chugging, grimy half-time rhythms that sounded like they were oozing from a sewage treatment plant." Eduardo Rivadavia of Loudwire wrote, "Obituary managed to stand out among the early Floridian death metal bands by way of a very simple, but effective songwriting strategy. Namely, while most of their contemporaries were still indebted to thrash and raging away at blazing speeds, Obituary embraced the slower tempos typical of doom metal, and fused it all together behind some of the era's heaviest guitar tones."

== Band members ==
Obituary at Party.San Metal Open Air 2023

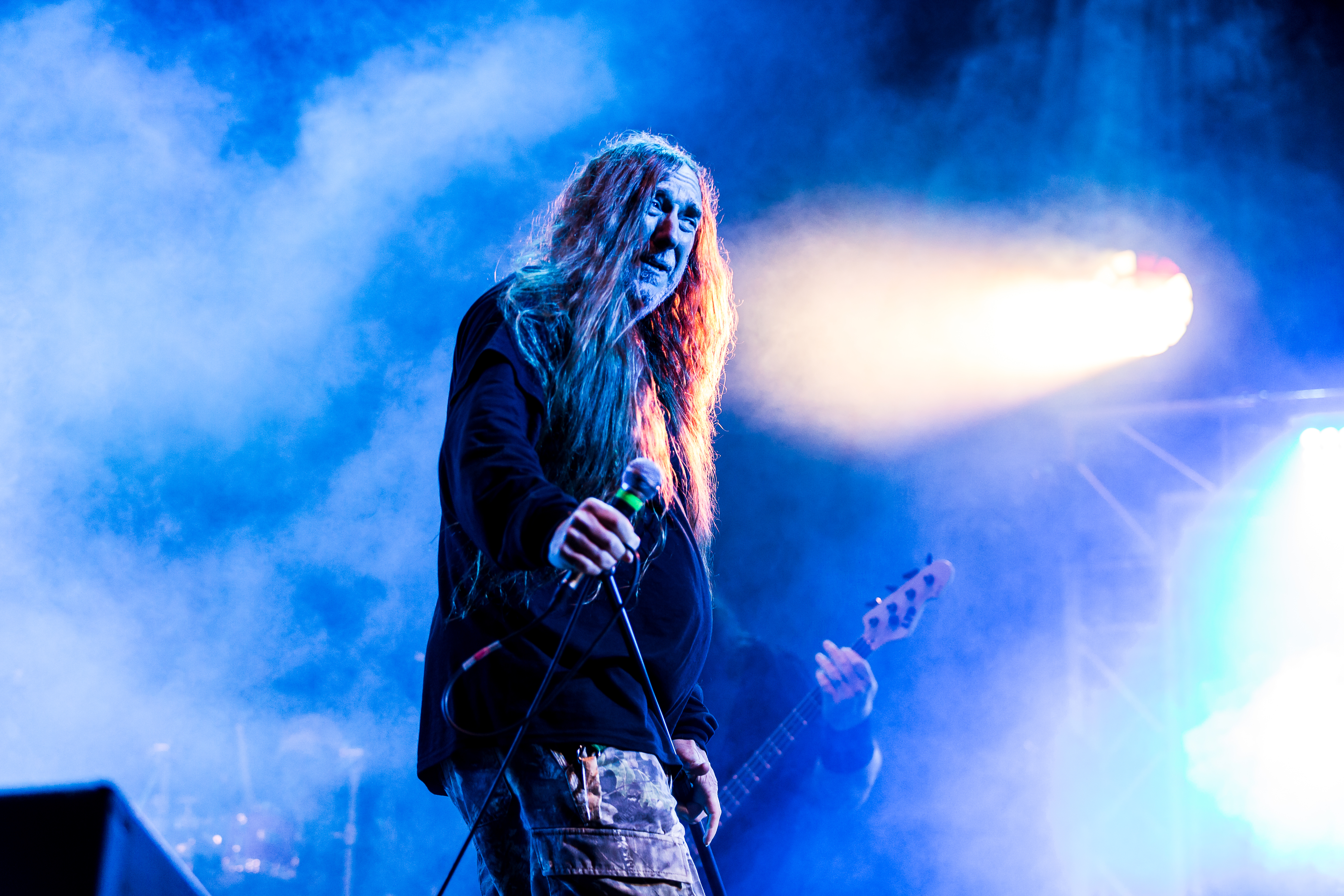
John Tardy

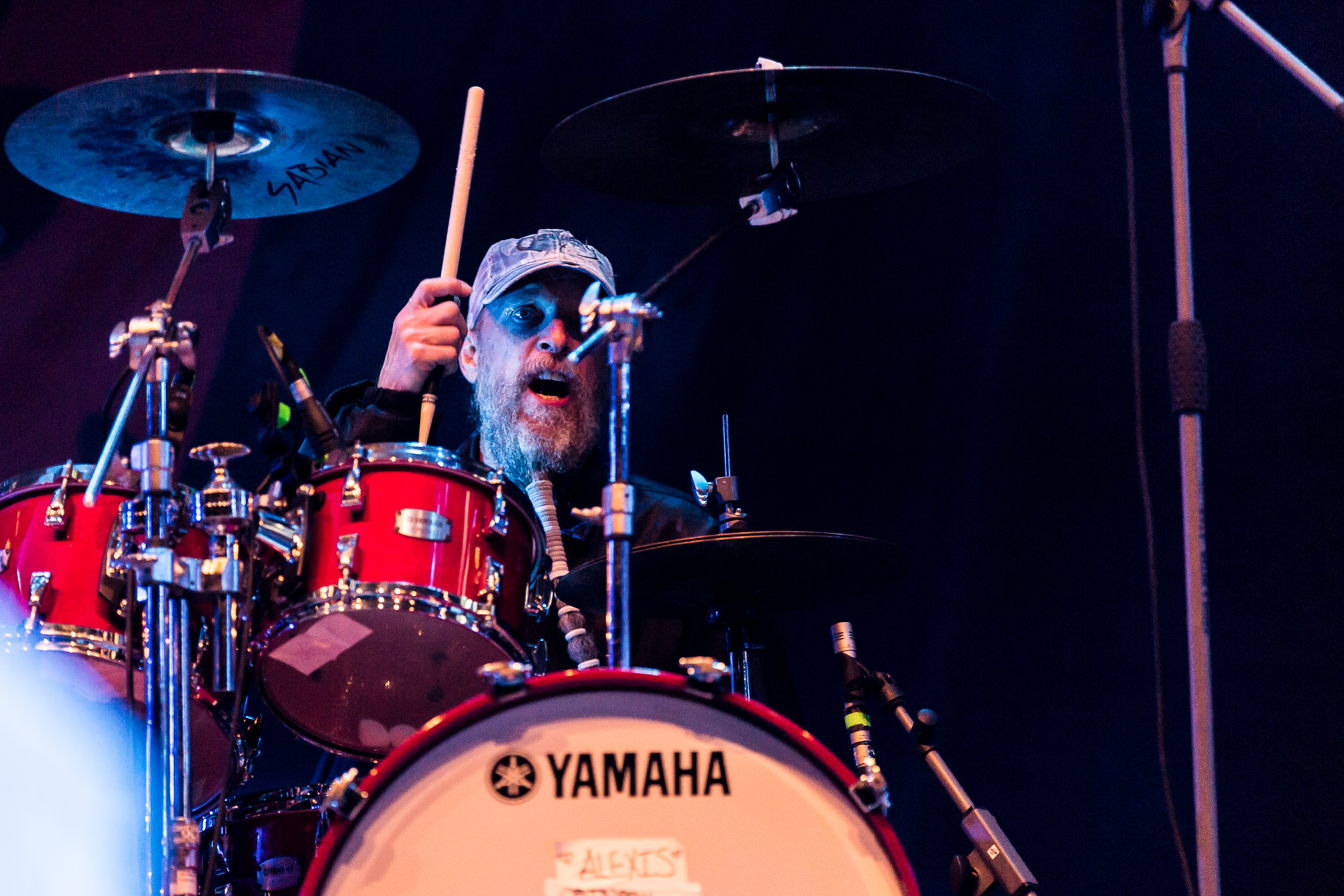
Donald Tardy

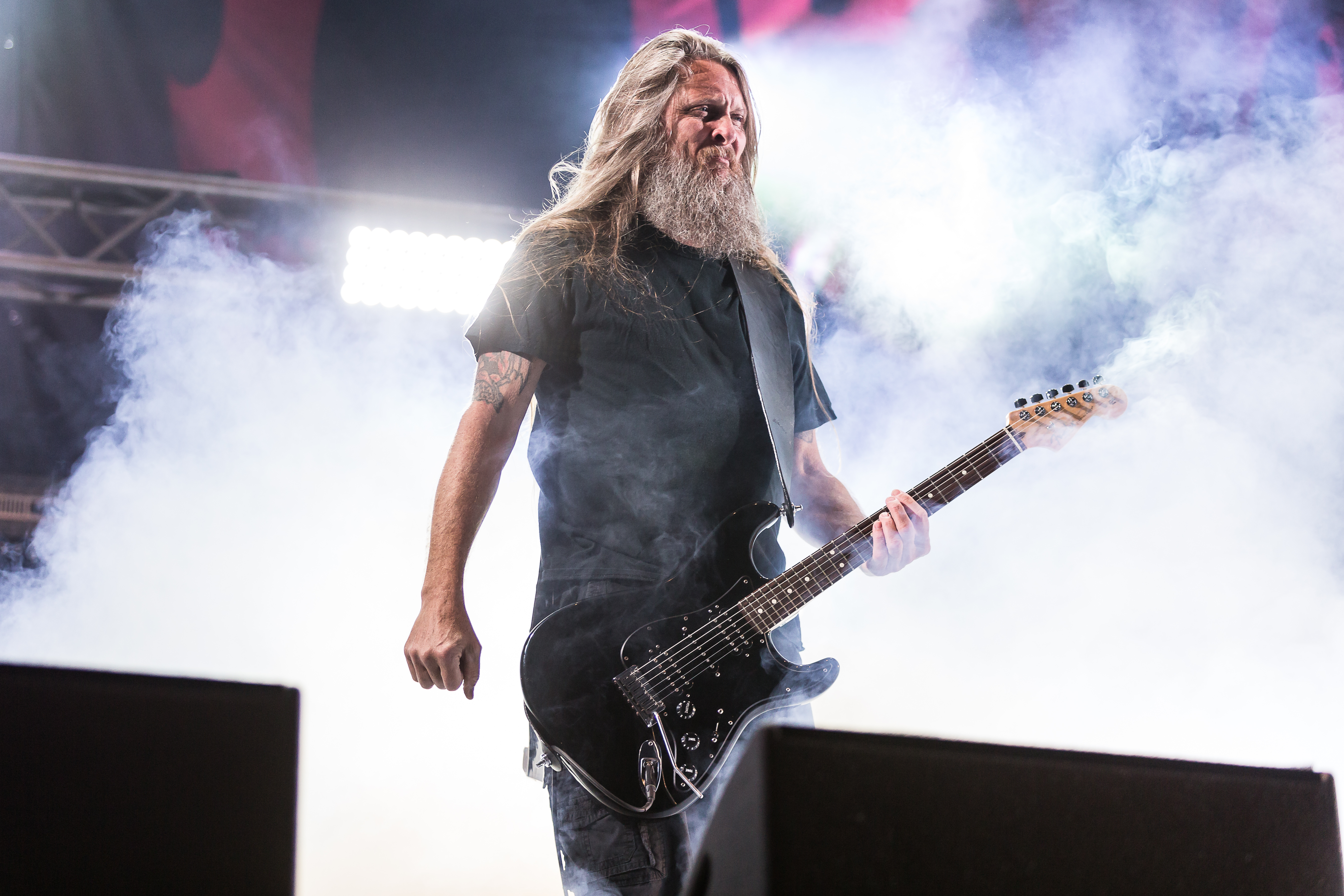
Trevor Peres

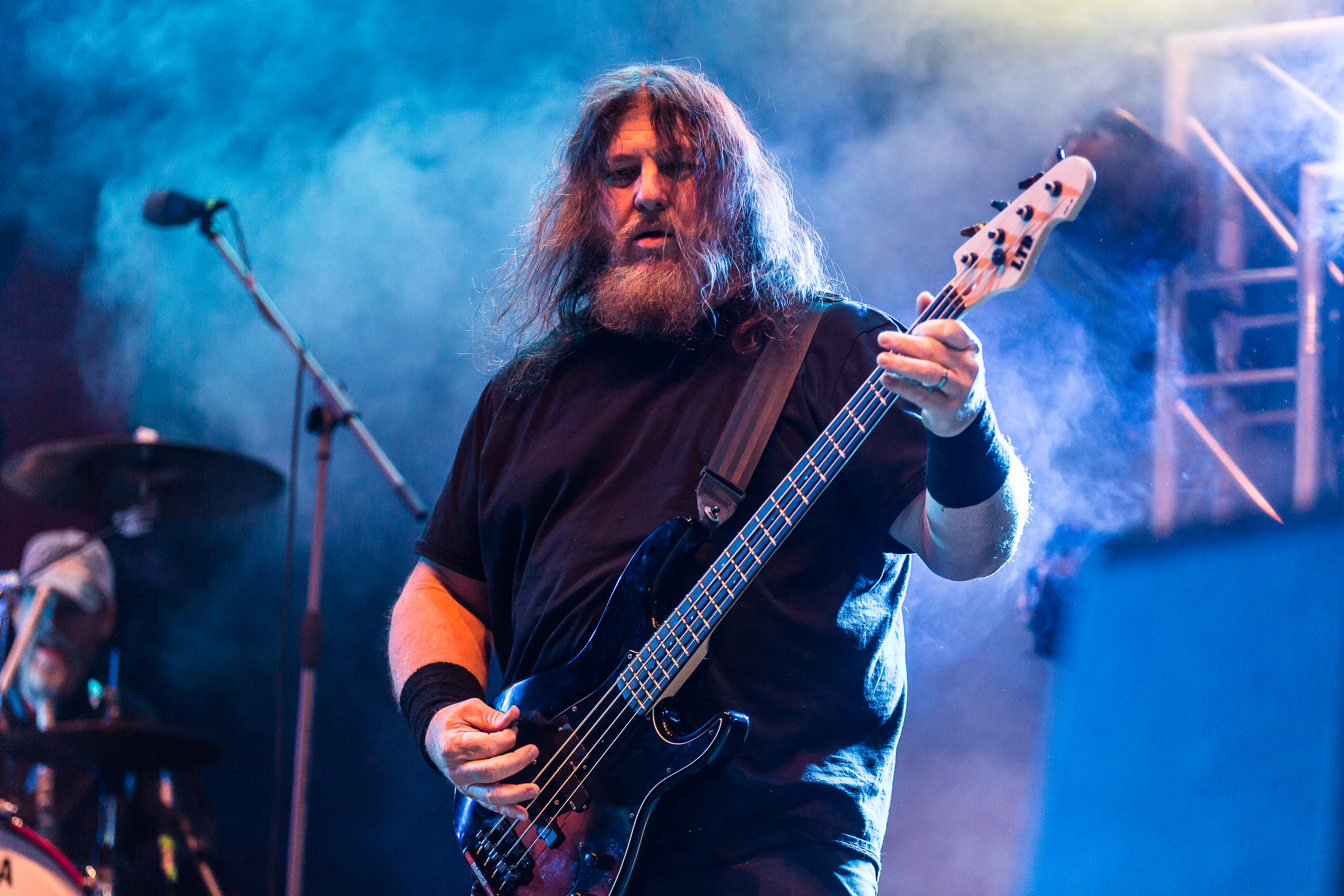
Terry Butler

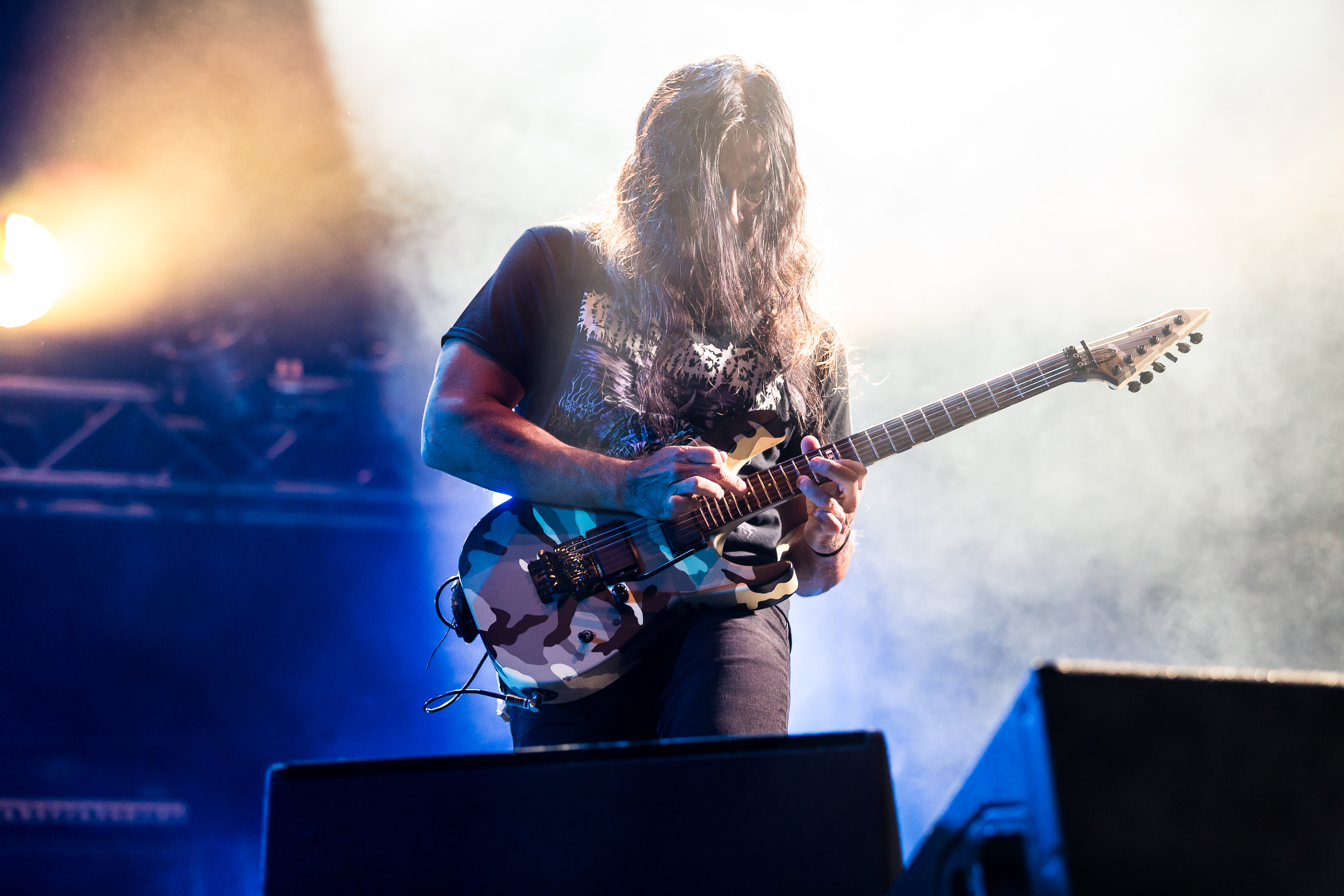
Kenny Andrews

=== Current ===
- John Tardy – vocals (1988–1998, 2003–present)
- Donald Tardy – drums (1988–1998, 2003–present)
- Trevor Peres – rhythm guitar (1988–1998, 2003–present)
- Terry Butler – bass (2010–present)
- Kenny Andrews – lead guitar (2012–present)

=== Former ===
- Allen West – lead guitar (1988–1989, 1991–1998, 2003–2006)
- Daniel Tucker – bass (1988–1989)
- James Murphy – lead guitar (1989–1991)
- Frank Watkins – bass (1989–1998, 2003–2010; died 2015)
- Ralph Santolla – lead guitar (2007–2011; died 2018)

== Discography ==
- Slowly We Rot (1989)
- Cause of Death (1990)
- The End Complete (1992)
- World Demise (1994)
- Back from the Dead (1997)
- Frozen in Time (2005)
- Xecutioner's Return (2007)
- Darkest Day (2009)
- Inked in Blood (2014)
- Obituary (2017)
- Dying of Everything (2023)
