= Six Feet Under discography =

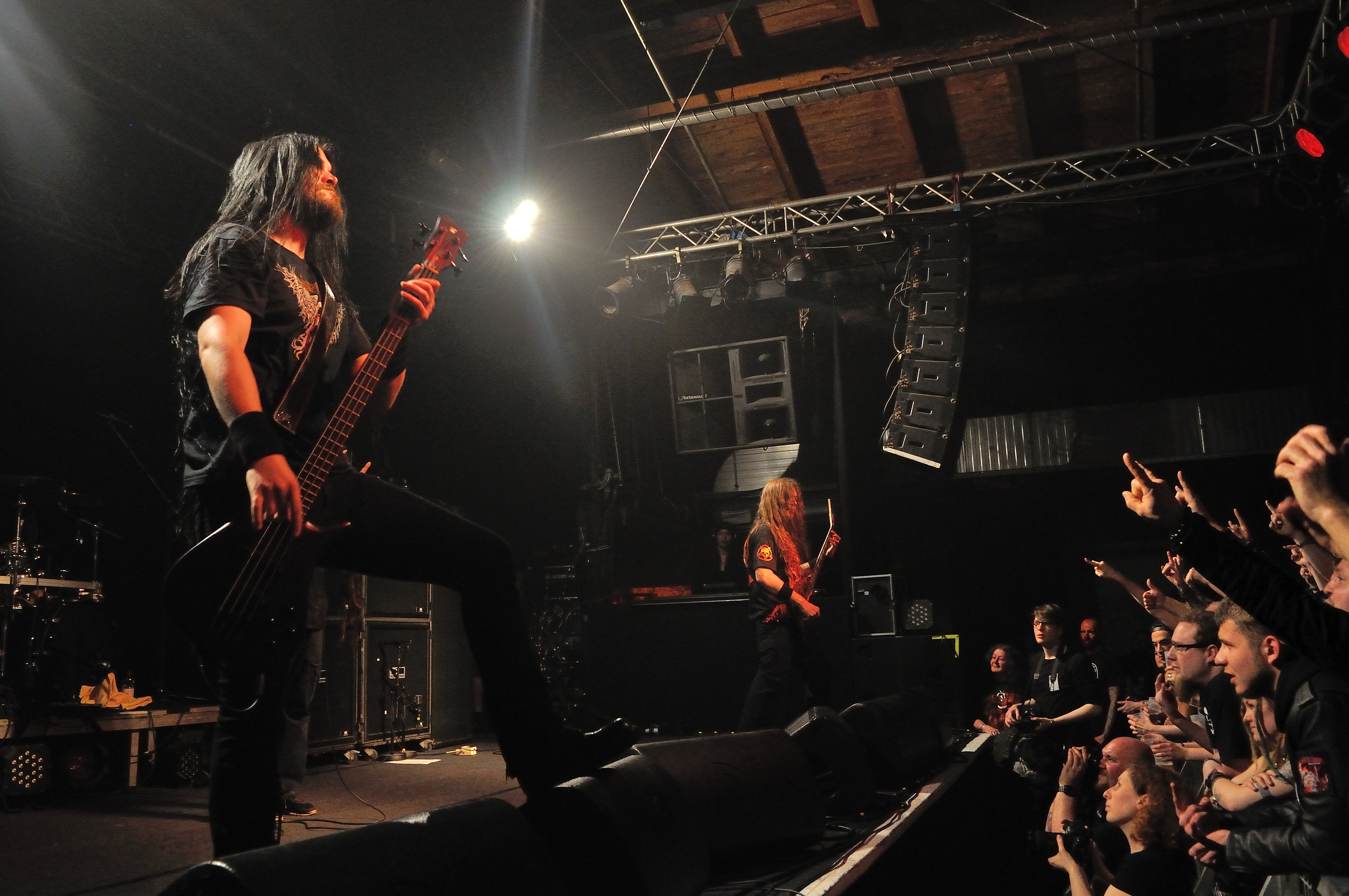
- Studio albums: 14
- Extended plays: 2
- Live albums: 1
- Tribute albums: 4
- Video albums: 4
- Music videos: 14

Six Feet Under is an American death metal band from Tampa, Florida. They have released fourteen studio albums, four cover albums, one live album, four video albums, two EPs and fourteen music videos.

== Studio albums ==
Title	Album details	Peak chart positions						Sales
Title	Album details	US	US Heat.	US Indie.	GER	AUT	BEL (WAL)	Sales
Haunted	Released: September 26, 1995; Label: Metal Blade; Formats: CD, LP, CS, digital download	—	—	—	—	—	—	
Warpath	Released: September 9, 1997; Label: Metal Blade; Formats: CD, LP, CS, digital download	—	35	—	—	—	—	
Maximum Violence	Released: July 13, 1999; Label: Metal Blade; Formats: CD, LP, CS, digital download	—	30	—	68	—	—	
True Carnage	Released: August 7, 2001; Label: Metal Blade; Formats: CD, LP, CS, digital download	—	18	12	40	69	—	
Bringer of Blood	Released: September 23, 2003; Label: Metal Blade; Formats: CD, CD+DVD, LP, digital download	—	22	20	36	—	—	US: 4,300
13	Released: March 22, 2005; Label: Metal Blade; Formats: CD, LP, digital download	—	36	41	51	62	—	
Commandment	Released: April 17, 2007; Label: Metal Blade; Formats: CD, LP, digital download	—	12	37	58	70	—	US: 3,000+
Death Rituals	Released: November 11, 2008; Label: Metal Blade; Formats: CD, LP, digital download	—	14	—	64	—	—	US: 2,300+
Undead	Released: May 22, 2012; Label: Metal Blade; Formats: CD, LP, digital download	186	6	33	65	—	—	US: 5,480+
Unborn	Released: March 19, 2013; Label: Metal Blade; Formats: CD, LP, digital download	—	17	—	85	—	148	US: 4,000+
Crypt of the Devil	Released: May 5, 2015; Label: Metal Blade; Formats: CD, LP, digital download	161	13	32	42	—	—	
Torment	Released: February 24, 2017; Label: Metal Blade; Formats: CD, LP, digital download	—	—	—	44	54	—	
Nightmares of the Decomposed	Released: October 2, 2020; Label: Metal Blade; Formats: CD, LP, digital download	146	—	—	35	—	—	
Killing for Revenge	Released: May 10, 2024; Label: Metal Blade; Formats: CD, LP, digital download	—	—	—	74	58	—	
Next to Die	Released: April 24, 2026; Label: Metal Blade; Formats: CD, LP, digital download	—	—	—	—	—	—	
"—" denotes a recording that did not chart or was not released in that territory.

=== Cover albums ===
Title	Album details	Peak chart positions	Sales
Title	Album details	US Heat.	Sales
Graveyard Classics	Released: October 24, 2000; Label: Metal Blade; Formats: CD, LP, digital download	—	
Graveyard Classics 2	Released: October 19, 2004; Label: Metal Blade; Formats: CD	—	
Graveyard Classics 3	Released: January 19, 2010; Label: Metal Blade; Formats: CD, digital download	31	US: 800+
Graveyard Classics IV: The Number of the Priest	Released: May 27, 2016; Label: Metal Blade; Formats: CD, LP, digital download	—	
"—" denotes a release that did not chart.

=== Live albums ===
Title	Album details
Double Dead Redux	Released: January 28, 2003; Label: Metal Blade; Formats: CD, digital download

=== Video albums ===
Title	Album details
Maximum Video	Released: May 22, 2001; Label: Metal Blade; Formats: VHS, DVD
Double Dead	Released: January 28, 2003; Label: Metal Blade; Formats: CD, digital download
Live with Full Force	Released: August 17, 2004; Label: Metal Blade; Formats: DVD
Wake the Night! Live in Germany	Released: January 27, 2011; Label: Metal Blade; Formats: DVD

== Extended plays ==
Title	EP details
Alive and Dead	Released: October 29, 1996; Label: Metal Blade; Formats: CD, digital Download
Unburied	Released: July 6, 2018, Reissue-October 2, 2020; Label: Metal Blade; Formats: Digital Download, Reissue-CD

== Music videos ==
Year	Song	Director
1996	"Lycanthropy"	—
1997	"Manipulation"	David Roth
1999	"Victim of the Paranoid"	David Roth
2002	"The Day the Dead Walked"	David Roth
2003	"Amerika the Brutal"	David Aronson
2004	"Bringer of Blood"	Ronald Matthes
2004	"Dead & Buried (Living Life in the Grave)"	Jerry Clubb
2005	"Shadow of the Reaper"	Gary Smithson
2005	"Deathklaat"	Ronald Matthes
2007	"Ghosts of the Undead"	Mario Framingheddu
2007	"Doomsday"	Mario Framingheddu
2008	"Seed of Filth"	Mario Framingheddu
2012	"18 Days"	
2015	"Open Coffin Orgy"	Mitch Massie
