= Torment (Six Feet Under album) =

Studio album by Six Feet Under
- Released: February 24, 2017
- Recorded: 2016
- Studio: Planet Z Studios (Hadley, Massachusetts); The Loft (Seattle, Washington); Diablo View Studios; London Bridge Studio (Seattle, Washington)
- Genre: Death metal
- Length: 46:59
- Label: Metal Blade
- Producer: Chris Barnes

Six Feet Under chronology
Crypt of the Devil (2015)	Torment (2017)	Nightmares of the Decomposed (2020)

Professional ratings
Review scores
Source	Rating
Cutting Edge	3/5 stars
Exclaim!	5/10
Inferno	4/5 stars
Laut.de	2/5 stars
Legacy	8/10
Powermetal.de	8.5/10
Revolver	3/5
Rock Hard	7.5/10
Soundi	2/5 stars

Torment is the twelfth studio album from American death metal band Six Feet Under, released on February 24, 2017 by Metal Blade Records. It is the first album to feature drummer Marco Pitruzzella. It is their first album since Unborn (2013) to feature bassist Jeff Hughell, whom also plays all guitars on the album.

== Background ==
Vocalist Chris Barnes gives an explanation about the album:

"Our new album does not sound like any of our previous albums. Just as Haunted didn't sound like Tomb of the Mutilated (from Barnes's previous band Cannibal Corpse), just like Maximum Violence didn't sound like Warpath, just like Undead didn't sound like 13. If you are expecting it to sound like one of our other albums, you will be disappointed. Saying that, the new music we have recorded is fucking insane."

Barnes also described the album as "the most brutally intense, groove-laden masterpiece we've ever put together!"

== Track listing ==
All lyrics are written by Chris Barnes; all music is composed by Jeff Hughell

No.	Title	Length
1.	"Sacrificial Kill"	3:55
2.	"Exploratory Homicide"	2:45
3.	"The Separation of Flesh from Bone"	4:52
4.	"Schizomaniac"	3:54
5.	"Skeleton"	3:43
6.	"Knife Through the Skull"	3:40
7.	"Slaughtered as They Slept"	4:55
8.	"In the Process of Decomposing"	3:50
9.	"Funeral Mask"	3:28
10.	"Obsidian"	4:14
11.	"Bloody Underwear"	3:41
12.	"Roots of Evil"	4:02
Total length:		46:59

== Personnel ==
Credits are adapted from the album's liner notes.

Six Feet Under

- Chris Barnes – vocals
- Jeff Hughell – guitars, bass
- Marco Pitruzzella – drums

Miscellaneous staff

- Chris Barnes – production
- Zeuss – mixing, mastering
- Jeff Hughell – recording (bass, guitars)
- Carson Lehman – recording (drums, vocals)
- Septian Devenum – artwork
- Brian Ames – graphic design

== Charts ==
Chart (2017)	Peak position
Austrian Albums (Ö3 Austria)	54
Belgian Albums (Ultratop Flanders)	113
German Albums (Offizielle Top 100)	44
Swiss Albums (Schweizer Hitparade)	98
