= Live with Full Force =

Live album DVD by Six Feet Under
- Released: August 17, 2004
- Genre: Death metal
- Label: Metal Blade

Live with Full Force is a DVD set by death metal band Six Feet Under. It was released in 2004 on Metal Blade Records.

== Track listing ==
=== Live With Full Force DVD ===
1. "Silent Violence"
2. "Suffering in Ecstasy"
3. "The Day the Dead Walked"
4. "Hacked to Pieces"
5. "Human Target"
6. "Feasting on the Blood of the Insane"
7. "Torture Killer"
8. "No Warning Shot"
9. "TNT"
10. "Bringer of Blood"
11. "Amerika the Brutal"
12. "Victim of the Paranoid"

=== Maximum Video DVD ===
1. "Hacked to Pieces - Backstage Version"
2. "Feasting on the Blood of the Insane"
3. "Human Target"
4. "War is Coming"
5. "Nonexistence"
6. "No Warning Shot"
7. "Revenge of the Zombie"
8. "Bonesaw"
9. "Torture Killer"
10. "Beneath a Black Sky"
11. "Shortcut to Hell"
12. "Victim of the Paranoid"
13. "Hacked to Pieces"
14. "4:20"
15. "Insect"
16. "Lycanthropy"
17. "Mass Murder Rampage"
18. "Brainwashed"
19. "Victim of the Paranoid - Video"
20. "Victim of the Paranoid - Wacken '99"
21. "Still Alive"
22. "This Graveyard Earth"
23. "Bonus Footage"

=== Bonus Audio CD ===
1. "Silent Violence"
2. "Human Target"
3. "Feasting on the Blood of the Insane"
4. "TNT"
5. "Victim of the Paranoid"
6. "Dead and Buried (Living Life in the Grave)"

== Personnel ==
- Chris Barnes - Vocals
- Steve Swanson - Guitars
- Terry Butler - Bass
- Greg Gall - Drums

== See also ==
- Six Feet Under
- Chris Barnes
