= Double Dead =

Double Dead (Redux)

Video by Six Feet Under
- Released: January 30, 2003
- Genre: Death metal
- Label: Metal Blade

Double Dead (Redux) is a CD/DVD Set by death metal band Six Feet Under. It was released in 2003 on Metal Blade Records.

== Track listing ==
=== CD ===
1. "The Day The Dead Walked"
2. "The Murderers"
3. "Waiting For Decay"
4. "Impulse To Disembowel"
5. "Feasting On The Blood Of The Insane"
6. "No Warning Shot"
7. "Silent Violence"
8. "The Enemy Inside"
9. "Victim Of The Paranoid"
10. "Journey Into Darkness"
11. "Revenge Of The Zombie"
12. "Manipulation"
13. "Torn To The Bone"
14. "4:20"
15. "Bonesaw"
16. "Hacked To Pieces"

=== DVD ===
1. "The Day The Dead Walked"
2. "The Murderers"
3. "Waiting For Decay"
4. "Impulse To Disembowel"
5. "Feasting On The Blood Of The Insane"
6. "No Warning Shot"
7. "Silent Violence"
8. "The Enemy Inside"
9. "Victim Of The Paranoid"
10. "Manipulation"
11. "Torn To The Bone"
12. "4:20"
13. "Bonesaw"
14. "Torture Killer"

== Double Dead (CD/DVD Set) ==
Double Dead

Studio album by Six Feet Under
- Released: October 28, 2002
- Genre: Death metal
- Label: Metal Blade

Double Dead is a CD/DVD Set by death metal band Six Feet Under. It was released in 2002 on Metal Blade Records.

== Personnel ==
- Chris Barnes - vocals
- Steve Swanson - guitars
- Terry Butler - bass
- Greg Gall - drums

== See also ==
- Six Feet Under
- Chris Barnes
