= A Decade in the Grave =

A Decade In The Grave

Box set by Six Feet Under
- Released: October 28, 2005
- Genre: Death metal
- Label: Metal Blade

Six Feet Under chronology
Graveyard Classics 2 (2004)	A Decade In The Grave (2005)	13 (2005)

Professional ratings
Review scores
Source	Rating
Allmusic	3.5/5 stars

A Decade In The Grave is a box set (4 CDs + 1 DVD) by death metal band Six Feet Under. It was released in 2005 on Metal Blade Records. Ten years after the formation of Six Feet Under, Metal Blade celebrated the band's longevity with A Decade in the Grave, a five-disc box set (four audio CDs plus a DVD). The first two discs is SFU's best-of, disc three contains rare demos as well as live performances, while the fourth disc contains demos and rehearsal material by Leviathan (the band Barnes sang for before Cannibal Corpse or SFU). The DVD offers a blend of videos and live performances. The box set also includes 4 new songs, "Dead and Buried (Living Life in the Grave)", "From Flesh Bone", "A Knife Fight to the Death", and "Burned at the Stake", the latter 3 being previously unreleased, and the former being recorded for the album.

== Track listing ==
=== CD 1 (Best Of Vol. 1) ===
1. "Feasting On The Blood Of The Insane"
2. "Revenge Of The Zombies"
3. "Impulse To Disembowel"
4. "Bonesaw"
5. "Dead And Buried (Living Life In The Grave)"
6. "The Enemy Inside"
7. "Drowning"
8. "Silent Violence"
9. "Bringer Des Blutes (Live)"
10. "Brainwashed"
11. "When Skin Turns Blue"
12. "Rest In Pieces"
13. "Braindead"
14. "Murdered In The Basement"

=== CD 2 (Best Of Vol. 2) ===
1. "Knife, Gun, Axe"
2. "War Is Coming"
3. "Shadow Of The Reaper"
4. "The Day The Dead Walked"
5. "Deathklaat"
6. "The Murderers"
7. "Decomposition Of The Human Race"
8. "Cadaver Mutilator"
9. "Hacked To Pieces"
10. "Remains Of You"
11. "Torture Killer"
12. "Lycanthropy"
13. "The Art Of Headhunting"
14. "This Graveyard Earth"

=== CD 3 (Rarities) ===
1. "Beneath A Black Sky (Demo)"
2. "Human Target (Demo)"
3. "Suffering In Ecstasy (Demo)"
4. "The Enemy Inside (Demo)"
5. "Tomorrow's Victim (Demo)"
6. "Ugly (Demo)"
7. "Claustrophobic (Demo)"
8. "From Flesh Bone"
9. "A Knife Fight To The Death"
10. "Burned At The Stake"
11. "War Is Coming (Live In San Francisco)"
12. "Brainwashed (Live In Albuquerque)"
13. "Human Target (Live In Golen)"
14. "Torture Killer (Live In San Francisco)"
15. "Revenge Of The Zombie (Live In San Francisco)"
16. "Lycanthropy (Live In San Francisco)"

=== CD 4 (Ten Years Before: Leviathan) ===
1. "Violent Slaughter"
2. "Destructive Aggressor"
3. "Lamentation Of Death"
4. "Leviathan"
5. "Asphyxiation"
6. "Tormented Nightmare"
7. "Blood Feast"
8. "Apocalyptic Rain"
9. "Bestial Deception"

=== DVD ===
1. "Lycanthropy"
2. "Manipulation"
3. "Victim Of The Paranoid"
4. "The Day The Dead Walked"
5. "Amerika The Brutal"
6. "Bringer Of Blood"
7. "Dead And Buried"
8. "Shadow Of The Reaper"
9. "Shadow Of The Reaper (Live In Berlin 2005)"
10. "Murdered In Basement"
11. "When Skin Turns Blue"
12. "No Warning Shot"
13. "Feasting On The Blood Of The Insane"
14. "Victim Of The Paranoid"
15. "Deathklaat"
16. "The Day The Dead Walked"
17. "Hacked To Pieces"
18. "Hacked To Pieces (Live With Full Force 2004)"
19. "No Warning Shot"

=== Bonus ===
- Poster
- SFU Sticker
- 32-page book
- SFU Trading cards

== Personnel ==
- Chris Barnes – vocals
- Steve Swanson – guitars (1998 – present)
- Allen West – guitars (1995 – 1997)
- Terry Butler – bass
- Greg Gall – drums
