= Cannabis Corpse =

American death metal band

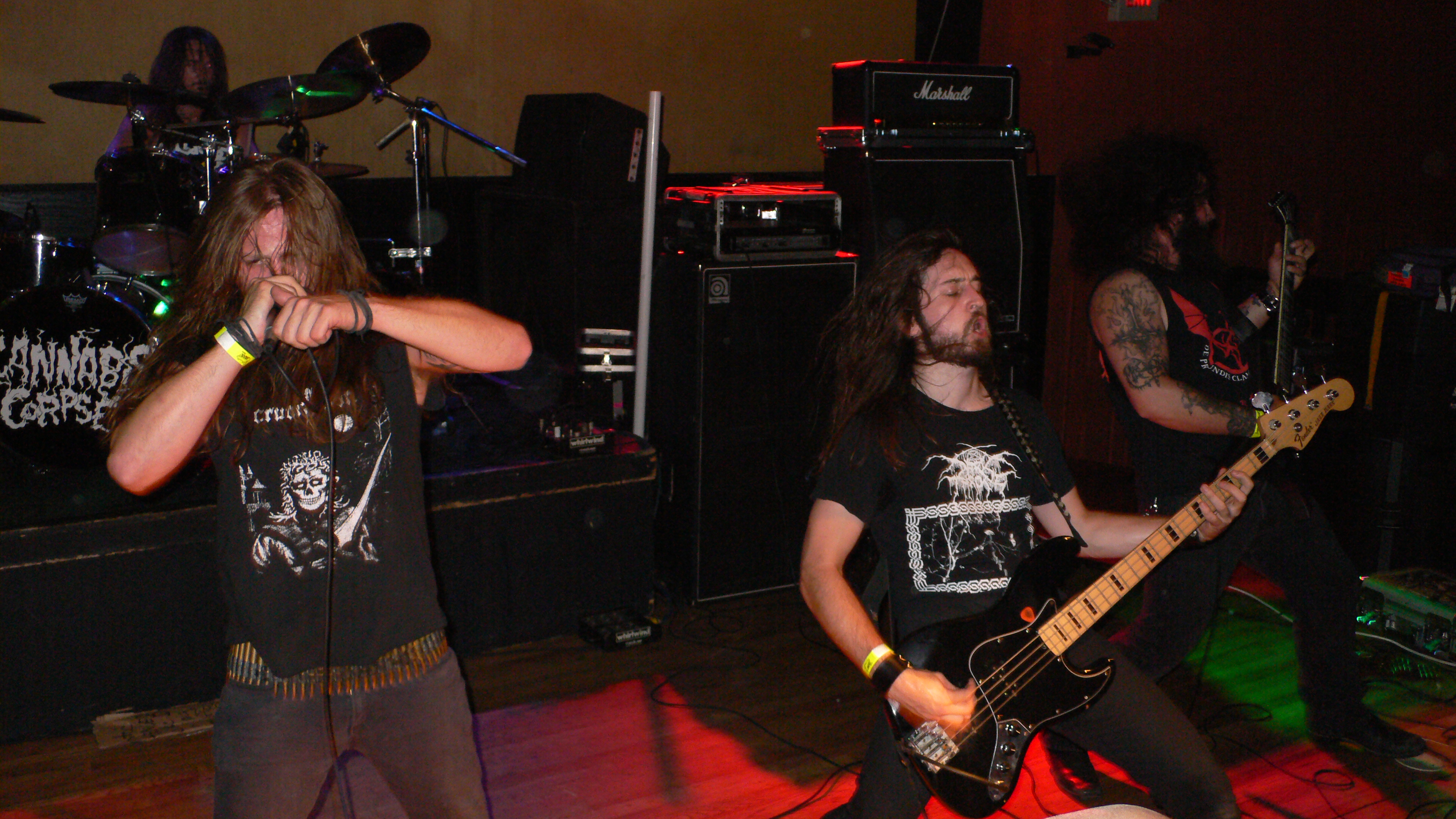
- Cannabis Corpse performing at Jaxx Club (Springfield, Virginia), 2010. Left to right: Josh Hall, Andy Horn, Phil Hall, Brent Purgason

Background information
- Origin: Richmond, Virginia, U.S.
- Genres: Death metal; comedy rock
- Years active: 2006–2025
- Labels: Season of Mist; Tankcrimes; Forcefield Records; Robotic Empire
- Members: Philip "Landphil" Hall; Josh "HallHammer" Hall; Adam Guilliams
- Past members: Andy "Weedgrinder" Horn; Nick "Nikropolis" Poulos; Brent Purgason; Brandon Ellis; Ray Suhy
- Logo

Cannabis Corpse was a cannabis-themed death metal band. Cannabis Corpse formed in Richmond, Virginia in 2006 under the Forcefield label. Since then, Cannabis Corpse has released six LPs and two EPs. The band features members of Municipal Waste and Antietam 1862.

Their name originates as a parody of the name of veteran death metal band Cannibal Corpse. While the Cannabis Corpse songs are fully original, their album and song titles are parodies of many other death metal bands' album and song titles (e.g. "Tube of the Resinated" vs Cannibal Corpse's "Tomb of the Mutilated").

== History ==
In 1999, bassist/guitarist Philip "Landphil" Hall coined the "Cannabis Corpse" name with his brother Josh "HallHammer" Hall. The original line up had Landphil on vocals and a recruit named John Gonzalez (of Nehema) on guitar. John moved to Hawaii and the band was put on hold until 2006, when Phil bought a multitrack recorder. The brothers, along with Andy "Weedgrinder" Horn recorded a demo for the band, which eventually became Blunted at Birth. Soon thereafter, they were signed as the first band to Richmond, Virginia-based Forcefield Records whose founders were personal friends.

Cannabis Corpse appear briefly in the BBC film In the Loop.

Cannabis Corpse toured Europe in 2013 with Ghoul, and announced that they had signed to Season of Mist on their website.

Cannabis Corpse was hired by Chris Barnes to be his studio band for Six Feet Under's album Crypt of the Devil in 2015. Phil played rhythm guitars and bass on the album as well as writing the music. Josh played drums and Brandon Ellis played lead guitar, before joining The Black Dahlia Murder. Guitarist Ray Suhy would later join Six Feet Under as a full time member after his stint in Cannabis Corpse.

Cannabis Corpse announced their official disbandment on October 17, 2025. Hall continues to perform with Municipal Waste.

== Band members ==
Final lineup

- Philip "Landphil" Hall – bass (2006–2025), vocals (2012–2025), guitars (2006–2008, 2012–2015), keyboards (2011–2012)
- Josh "HallHammer" Hall – drums (2006–2025)
- Adam Guilliams – lead guitar (2018–2025)

Previous members

- Nick "Nikropolis" Poulos – lead guitar (2008–2012)
- Andy "Weedgrinder" Horn – vocals (2006–2012)
- Brent Purgason – lead guitar (2012–2014)
- Brandon Ellis – lead guitar (2014–2015)
- Ray Suhy – rhythm guitar (2015–2018)

Touring

- Vic "Con-Vic" Anti – rhythm guitar (2009)
- Adam Jinch – lead guitar (2017)

Guest appearances

- Jeff "Wartom" Bush (2006, guest vocals on "Force Fed Shitty Grass")
- Will "Power" Towles (2006, guest vocals on "When Weed Replaces Life")
- Randy Blythe (January 7, 2012, guest appearance at the 'Cory Smoot Benefit Show' and at the 'Welcome Home Randy Blythe show')
- Chris Barnes (2014, guest vocals on "Individual Pot Patterns")
- Trevor Strnad (2014, guest vocals on "With Their Hash He Will Create")

== Discography ==
=== Albums ===
- Blunted at Birth (2006)
- Tube of the Resinated (2008)
- Beneath Grow Lights Thou Shalt Rise (2011)
- From Wisdom to Baked (2014)
- Left Hand Pass (2017)
- Nug So Vile (2019)

=== EPs ===
- The Weeding (2009)
- Splatterhash (2013) – split with Ghoul

=== Compilations ===
- Choice Nugs (2017)
