= Steve Swanson =

Steve Swanson may refer to:

- Steven Swanson (born 1960), American astronaut
- Steve Swanson (guitarist), American former lead guitarist for Six Feet Under
- Steve Swanson (soccer), American soccer coach for the Virginia Cavaliers
