= Rancid Amputation =

Song by Cannibal Corpse

from the album Butchered at Birth
- Released: 1991
- Studio: Morrisound Recording
- Genre: Death metal
- Label: Metal Blade Records
- Composer: Cannibal Corpse
- Lyricist: Chris Barnes
- Producer: Scott Burns

"Rancid Amputation" is a song by American death metal band Cannibal Corpse from their second studio album Butchered at Birth. It is considered a classic in their discography.

While the band faced touring restrictions due to their lyrical content, an Australian comedian performed a lounge music arrangement of the song to argue the point that the music was problematic instead of the lyrics.

American actor Jim Carrey reportedly talked about the song with the band when he met them in 1994, reciting lyrics to them.

In 2017, Canadian YouTuber Steve Terreberry made a video where he paired the song's lyrics with the 2006 song "Hey There Delilah" by the Plain White T's.
