= Eaten Back to Life =

Studio album by Cannibal Corpse
- Released: August 17, 1990
- Recorded: May 1990
- Studios: Morrisound (Tampa, Florida)
- Genres: Death metal; thrash metal
- Length: 36:21
- Labels: Metal Blade; Space Shower Music (JPN)
- Producer: Scott Burns

Cannibal Corpse chronology
Cannibal Corpse (demo) (1989)	Eaten Back to Life (1990)	Butchered at Birth (1991)

Professional ratings
Review scores
Source	Rating
AllMusic	2.5/5 stars
Collector's Guide to Heavy Metal	5/10

Eaten Back to Life is the debut studio album by American death metal band Cannibal Corpse. It was released on August 17, 1990, through Metal Blade Records.

The album was recorded at Morrisound Recording in Tampa, Florida and was produced by Scott Burns. The album contains five re-recorded songs that were previously released on their 1989 demo. The album's cover artwork was created by comic book artist Vince Locke, and depicts a zombie mutilating and cannibalizing itself.

Unlike the band's later albums, Eaten Back to Life features a sound that is rooted in thrash metal, drawing influence from bands such as Exodus, Sepultura and Dark Angel. Despite its primitive sound, it is now considered to be an essential release in the development of the death metal genre. The album's penultimate track "A Skull Full of Maggots" is a fan favorite, and remains a staple in the band's live set. Additionally, in recent years the album has appeared in popular culture.

== Background and recording ==
Cannibal Corpse formed in Buffalo, New York in 1988. With their debut, the band sought to further develop the extreme lyrics and imagery of other early death metal bands such as Carcass and Death. According to bassist Alex Webster: "We saw that a lot of bands in Florida seemed to have more of a darker, anti-religion thing going on [such as with Morbid Angel and Deicide], so we decided to do the gore thing with the art and lyrics." Founding guitarist Jack Owen half-joked that the album's song titles were conceived before the band had written any music. The band would record instrumental demo tapes that vocalist Chris Barnes would then take home and write lyrics to. Founding guitarist Bob Rusay composed the guitar riffs to "A Skull Full of Maggots." Drummer Paul Mazurkiewicz recalled: "It was just friends getting together playing music that we loved. [...] That's as simple as it was and that's how it starts: you're not thinking of anything in the future, you're just thinking, 'Let's get together, make some cool music that we enjoy.' When Cannibal formed we were definitely looking to take it to the next level, but we were still just playing music we liked."

The album was recorded at Morrisound Recording in Tampa, Florida, where many other influential early death metal releases were produced. Webster specifically cited the band's appreciation of albums like Altars of Madness by Morbid Angel and Leprosy by Death as having inspired the choice of studio. They were able to make friends and connections within the burgeoning Tampa death metal scene and would ultimately relocate there. Webster and Mazurkiewicz recorded bass and drum tracks simultaneously. Many songs were done in one take, as the band did not yet have the budget to spend long hours in the studio.

Glen Benton of Deicide performs guest vocals on the tracks "Mangled" and "A Skull Full of Maggots."

== Music and lyrics ==
Referred to as "death metal for dummies" and a "Neanderthal version of death metal," the sound on Eaten Back to Life has been described as "the soundtrack to a serial killer's abhorrent lair," and employs many – if not all – of the genre's trademark characteristics.

According to Greg Pratt of Exclaim, "Eaten showcases an early stage of the band, not quite as extreme as they would become, incorporating more heavy thrash elements into their sound as opposed to the straight-up no-nonsense death metal the band would adopt on their next album and continue to run with for the rest of their career." The album employs growling vocals, "grinding" guitar riffs, chromatic melodies, tempo changes and blast beats. According to music journalist T Coles, "with the sonic standard now set, the band leant much further into the heavy double bass and palm muting that would define the genre."

The drumming has been characterized as sounding like "the relentless pound of meat hammers in the abattoir." Guitarist Jack Owen cited the works of Exodus, early Sepultura, Celtic Frost, Napalm Death and Dark Angel as influences present on the album. He said, "we were into thrash and triplet playing on the guitar". Chris Barnes' vocal performance on the album has been described as sounding like "Satan on a diet of razor blades and paint thinner." The album's lyrics have been described as "ludicrously over the top." Topics explored on the album include maggots.

== Artwork ==
The album cover, which depicts a zombie mutilating and cannibalizing itself, was created by horror comic book artist Vince Locke, who the band would continue to collaborate with in the future. Monsieur De Suede Pompeux of Metal Hammer wrote: "Eaten back to life. It’s a statement that resonates, reverberates and renovates. Is it possible to eat yourself back to life? That’s the question that the artist poses here – coming from the brink of death (or possibly even death itself), the subject has enabled himself to continue living by eating his own intestines, and as I’m sure you can agree, that makes complete sense in every possible way." A statement can be found in the album's liner notes, dedicating it to the memory of Alferd Packer.

In the Centuries of Torment documentary, Locke joked that "Chris Barnes hunted [him] down" to collaborate.

== Reception and legacy ==
Eaten Back to Life is now considered by many to be an essential album in the death metal genre. John Weiderhorn of Loudwire called the album "a raw and powerful collection of tunes that [has stood] the test of time." Adem Tepedelen of Revolver wrote in 2006: "Cannibal Corpse became a gore-metal franchise with the release of their now-mandatory, splatter-flick-inspired debut."

In 2020, Chris Krovatin of Kerrang! wrote: "As far as death metal debuts go, Eaten is an incredible record, full of wily guitars and Chris Barnes' patented hoarse growl, and for fans of that classic Scott Burns sound, this record can’t be beat. But in the long line-up of Cannibal Corpse’s discography, Eaten is more about how much promise you can hear on it than it is about death metal mastery."

In 2023, Jon Weiderhorn of Loudwire wrote: "At the time of its release, Eaten Back to Life was one of the sickest, most demented death metal albums ever released. Of course, over the next five years Cannibal Corpse would release even faster, more disturbing songs and accompanying art work that would land them in the crosshairs of conservative, God-fearing Americans, politicians looking to gain points with scared parents and anyone unsettled by genuinely sick s--t. While it wasn’t the goal, the controversy helped Cannibal Corse sell more records and increase their following. Still, despite their influence Cannibal Corpse were too brutal to cross over into the mainstream." Weiderhorn also stated the belief that the album was "the perfect gateway to the underground" due to its thrash metal sound.

In 2024, Joe DiVita of Loudwire wrote: "One of the most enthralling things about the death metal’s pioneers and their debut records is hearing the genre itself being molded, wrought from thrash as each band put their stamp on what this new thing was becoming. Eaten Back to Life helped change extreme music forever. Chris Barnes vividly graphic, brutal lyrics were and still are deranged, establishing a lyrical blueprint other acts have spent decades imitating."

Some reviews were less positive. Leslie Mathew of AllMusic gave the album an underwhelming retrospective review, criticizing the album's perceived lack of variety and "interesting guitar work".

=== Kourtney Kardashian controversy ===
In 2021, Barnes called Kourtney Kardashian a "poser" after a photograph of her wearing a Cannibal Corpse shirt while out with then-fiancee and blink-182 drummer Travis Barker made headlines. The shirt was a long-sleeved Eaten Back to Life Shirt, which had the band's original logo. The shirt was later revealed to have belonged to Barker himself. Barker responded to Barnes' comments, saying: "To speak on that, that's the lamest shit ever. Obviously my fiancée doesn't listen to Cannibal Corpse, but I do. I grew up loving them. For [someone] to mention that in a negative light — fucking lame, you know? She's wearing it because she's cold. She's not claiming she knows every song. But I do! I bought every album, and I learned how to play every album."

Alex Webster was quoted as follows regarding the controversy: "I remember I’d see these classic shirts. You’ll see a Motorhead shirt or Ramones shirt or Slayer logo shirt, Iron Maiden shirt, AC/DC shirt… Those kinds of things you’ll see in pop culture, not just in the music scene. [...] For us to start dipping into that a little bit... That was something I always kind of hoped would happen. I think anyone in a band [would want to] have that kind of growth in your career. To be able to really just be no one universally, in a way. It’s something you can kind of hope for, but you can’t really plan on it happening. So I think just by us having been around for a long time, it’s sort of gotten there over the years. Every now and then, there’ll be this weird pop culture kind of reference to us that you wouldn’t expect. And it can be it can be with merch or something like that. And to be fair, we’ve just been lucky in that way."

== Track listing ==
All lyrics written by Chris Barnes, except where noted. All music written by Cannibal Corpse.

No.	Title	Lyrics	Length
1.	"Shredded Humans"	Barnes; Jack Owen	5:11
2.	"Edible Autopsy"		4:32
3.	"Put Them to Death"		1:50
4.	"Mangled"	Barnes; Paul Mazurkiewicz	4:29
5.	"Scattered Remains, Splattered Brains"	Barnes; Owen	2:34
6.	"Born in a Casket"		3:20
7.	"Rotting Head"	Barnes; Owen	2:26
8.	"The Undead Will Feast"	Barnes; Owen; Alex Webster	2:49
9.	"Bloody Chunks"		1:53
10.	"A Skull Full of Maggots"		2:06
11.	"Buried in the Backyard"		5:11
Total length:			36:21

Bonus track
No.	Title	Length
12.	"Born in a Casket" (live)	3:34

== Personnel ==
Cannibal Corpse

- Chris Barnes – vocals
- Bob Rusay – guitars
- Jack Owen – guitars
- Alex Webster – bass
- Paul Mazurkiewicz – drums

Additional musicians

- Glen Benton – backing vocals on "Mangled" and "A Skull Full of Maggots"
- Francis M. Howard – backing vocals on "Mangled" and "A Skull Full of Maggots"
- Pat O'Brien – lead guitar on live bonus track
- George "Corpsegrinder" Fisher – vocals on live bonus track

Technical personnel

- Scott Burns – production, engineering
- Vincent Locke – cover art, Eaten Back to Life logo
- Chris Barnes – Cannibal Corpse logo
- Mike Mulley – photo
- Brian Ames – graphic design

== Charts ==
Chart performance for Eaten Back to Life / Butchered at Birth
Chart (1995)	Peak position
Australian Albums (ARIA)	192
