= Graveyard Classics 3 =

Graveyard Classics III

Compilation album of cover tracks by Six Feet Under
- Released: January 19, 2010
- Recorded: November–December 2009 at D.O.I. Digital Audio, Tampa, Florida
- Genre: Death 'n' roll
- Length: 46:07
- Label: Metal Blade
- Producer: Chris Barnes

Six Feet Under chronology
Death Rituals (2008)	Graveyard Classics III (2010)	Undead (2012)

Professional ratings
Review scores
Source	Rating
Allmusic	3.5/5 stars

Graveyard Classics III is the third cover album by Six Feet Under. It was released on January 19, 2010 on Metal Blade Records.

The album was recorded at D.O.I. Digital Audio in Tampa, Florida. Mark Lewis mixed Graveyard Classics III at Audiohammer Studios, and the album was produced by band member Chris Barnes.

This was the last album to feature original members Greg Gall and Terry Butler before their departure in early 2011.

== Track listing ==
No.	Title	Length
1.	"A Dangerous Meeting" (Mercyful Fate)	5:10
2.	"Metal On Metal" (Anvil)	4:07
3.	"The Frayed Ends of Sanity" (Metallica)	7:40
4.	"At Dawn They Sleep" (Slayer)	6:30
5.	"Not Fragile" (Bachman–Turner Overdrive)	4:02
6.	"On Fire" (Van Halen)	3:15
7.	"Pounding Metal" (Exciter)	4:23
8.	"Destroyer" (Twisted Sister)	4:09
9.	"Psycho Therapy" (The Ramones)	2:30
10.	"Snap Your Fingers, Snap Your Neck" (Prong)	4:13
Total length:		46:07

== Personnel ==
Six Feet Under

- Chris Barnes - vocals
- Steve Swanson - guitars
- Terry Butler - bass
- Greg Gall - drums

Productions

- Chris Barnes - production
- Mark Lewis - mixing
- Chaz Najjar - engineering
- Dusty Peterson - artwork
