= Graveyard Classics =

Studio album of cover tracks by Six Feet Under
- Released: January 24, 2000
- Genre: Death 'n' roll
- Length: 46:06
- Label: Metal Blade Records
- Producer: Chris Barnes, Brian Slagel

Six Feet Under chronology
Maximum Violence (1999)	Graveyard Classics (2000)	True Carnage (2001)

Professional ratings
Review scores
Source	Rating
Allmusic	2/5 stars

Graveyard Classics is a cover album by American death metal band Six Feet Under. It includes cover versions of such classic rock hits as "T.N.T." by AC/DC, "Smoke on the Water" by Deep Purple, and "Purple Haze" by Jimi Hendrix.

== Track listing ==
No.	Title	Length
1.	"Holocaust" (Savatage)	4:39
2.	"T.N.T." (AC/DC)	3:29
3.	"Sweet Leaf" (Black Sabbath)	5:22
4.	"Piranha" (Exodus)	3:50
5.	"Son of a Bitch" (Accept)	3:39
6.	"Stepping Stone" (The Monkees)	2:39
7.	"Confused" (Angel Witch)	2:51
8.	"California über alles" (Dead Kennedys)	3:40
9.	"Smoke on the Water" (Deep Purple)	5:24
10.	"Blackout" (Scorpions)	3:43
11.	"Purple Haze" (The Jimi Hendrix Experience)	2:52
12.	"In League with Satan" (Venom)	3:58
Total length:		46:06

Limited Edition Bonus Tracks
No.	Title	Length
13.	"War Machine" (Kiss cover)
14.	"Wrathchild" (Iron Maiden cover)
15.	"Jailbreak" (Thin Lizzy cover)

== Personnel ==
Six Feet Under

- Chris Barnes - vocals
- Steve Swanson - guitars
- Terry Butler - bass
- Greg Gall - drums

Guest musician

- John Bush - guest vocals on "Blackout"

Production

- Produced by Brian Slagel
- Engineered by Chris Carroll
- Mixed by Brian Slagel at Morrisound Studios
- Mastered by Eddy Schreyer at Oasis Mastering

Artwork

- Cover art by Paul Booth
- Photography by Joe Giron
