= Jeff Hughell =

American bassist (born 1979)

- Born: December 4, 1979 (age 46)
- Genres: Death metal; technical death metal
- Occupation: Musician
- Instruments: Bass; guitar
- Years active: 1995–present
- Member of: Six Feet Under
- Formerly of: Vile; Brain Drill; Reciprocal; Asylum; Rings of Saturn

Jeff Hughell (born December 4, 1979) is an American musician. He is the former bassist for death metal bands Asylum, Vile and Brain Drill and the current bassist for Six Feet Under and Reciprocal. He has released four solo albums and has played bass on multiple records as a session player.

Hughell currently endorses Warwick bass guitars, Seymour Duncan pickups and Dean Markley strings. He is a prominent user of seven-string bass guitars.

Hughell also plays guitar and piano. He played all the guitar parts on Six Feet Under's album Torment and frequently plays both guitar and piano on his solo albums.

== Discography ==
Osmium

- From the Ashes (2003)

Brain Drill

- Apocalyptic Feasting (2008)

Reciprocal

- Reciprocal (2009)
- New Order of the Ages (2013)

Solo

- I Came to Hate (2009)
- Chaos Labyrinth (2013)
- Trinidad Scorpion Hallucinations (2016)
- Sleep Deprivation (2019)

Feared

- Furor Incarnatus (2013)

Skin the Lamb

- Monolithic (2016)

Six Feet Under

- Unborn (2013)
- Torment (2017)
- Unburied (2018)
- Nightmares of the Decomposed (2020)
- Killing for Revenge (2024)
- Next to Die (2026)
