= Butchered at Birth =

Studio album by Cannibal Corpse
- Released: July 1, 1991
- Recorded: 1991
- Studios: Morrisound Recording, Tampa, Florida
- Genre: Death metal
- Length: 36:34
- Label: Metal Blade
- Producer: Scott Burns

Cannibal Corpse chronology
Eaten Back to Life (1990)	Butchered at Birth (1991)	Tomb of the Mutilated (1992)

Professional ratings
Review scores
Source	Rating
AllMusic	4/5 stars
Collector's Guide to Heavy Metal	6/10
Kerrang!	5/5 stars
MusicHound Rock	3/5 stars

Butchered at Birth is the second album by the American death metal band Cannibal Corpse. It was released on July 1, 1991, through Metal Blade Records.

The album was recorded at Morrisound Recording in Tampa, Florida, and was produced by Scott Burns. It is considered to be musically and lyrically more extreme than the band's debut, Eaten Back to Life. The album's music represents an evolution to "pure death metal" from the thrash metal–oriented sound of its predecessor. Barnes stated that the album is a concept album about butchery. Its cover artwork was created by comic book artist Vince Locke, and depicts a pregnant woman being dissected by zombies.

Butchered remains a notorious entry in the band's discography, and has been censored by various entities at different points in its history.

== Background and recording ==
Cannibal Corpse began writing new material immediately following the release of their debut album, Eaten Back to Life. With their sophomore effort, Cannibal Corpse sought to create a heavier sound and even more gruesome imagery than their debut. The band wrote and rehearsed the album in their storage space in Buffalo.

During this time, the band was having four-hour practice sessions five days per week. The writing process for the album's instrumentation was a collaborative effort. Guitarist Jack Owen recalled that "everybody was writing tons of shit" and vocalist Chris Barnes said the band was "writing a song every two weeks." Drummer Paul Mazurkiewicz said "it was months of us trying to be the most brutal band on earth." He claims to have written the opening riff in "Gutted."

Following their experience recording Eaten Back to Life at Morrisound Recording in Tampa, the band became entrenched in the growing death metal scene there, and subsequently made frequent trips to the city. The spirit of competition within the scene encouraged the band to keep a quick pace with releases, and Butchered at Birth was recorded over a two-week period. Producer Scott Burns, revered within the Florida death metal scene, assisted the band in refining the sound of their debut to achieve even more dissonant and guttural sonic textures. Burns noted that very little production was required for Barnes' vocals, which he felt "sounded heavy on their own." The album's liner notes explicitly state that no harmonizers were used on the vocal production. Karl Sanders of Nile recalled in the Centuries of Torment documentary that when the album was first released, "people were going, 'how can a human voice do that!?'"

== Music and lyrics ==
The album represents the band's transition to "pure death metal" from the thrash-orientated sound of their debut, an assessment that is agreed upon by music journalists and the band members themselves. Founding guitarist Jack Owen believes Butchered at Birth showcases the band's greatest evolution between albums. The music is now considered to have a "classic death metal" sound.

The album's style has been called "one dimensional" and "rough around the edges." Owen retrospectively described the album's song structures as "just riff after riff" and not "[making] much sense." According to bassist Alex Webster, "we were convinced the more unorthodox the music, the less mainstream it was. It was heavier to be off-the-wall as far as arrangements go." In addition to its extremely raw songwriting, Butchered is also noted for its "harsh, barely tuned guitars" and its "beehive-wall of white noise" guitar tone. According to Zeke Ferrington of Gear Gods, "There's so much gain and so much treble that you can't identify individual notes anymore. The guitar lines meld into these indefinite, evolving, waves of unsettling frequencies [...] it actually adds to the revolting brutality of [the] album." Chris Barnes' "grunted" vocals are largely unintelligible. Despite a statement in the album's liner notes that no harmonizers were used on his vocal performance, the album opener "Meathook Sodomy" contains an intro that prominently utilizes the pitch shifting technique on the vocals.

At the time of the album's release, its lyrics were considered to be the most gruesome and extreme that the genre had to offer, exploring macabre subject matter such as necrophilia, coprophagia, torture, urolagnia, dismemberment, infanticide, disembowelment, cannibalism and sadomasochism. The album's lyrics were singlehandedly penned by Barnes, who strove to write the very first death metal concept album, and has stated that the album's central theme is "butchery". He explained: "The beginning introduction finishes it off. Backwards it says ["feed off the carcasses of babies"]. I put myself in different points of view in different songs. [...] The [album] is pretty visual, it's all there. You don't have to ask any questions. That's how I write. I get a title in my head and write a little story."

Cannibal Corpse's use of shock value has drawn comparisons to Gwar. Alex Henderson of AllMusic assessed that Butchered "comes off as a parody of death metal and grindcore more than anything", describing the album as the "musical equivalent of [a] B-movie horror flick."

== Artwork ==
Butchered at Birth's infamous album artwork is a watercolor painting depicting "evil zombie doctors pulling a dead baby as it comes out of a dead woman," according to Greg Pratt of Exclaim. Joe Divita of Loudwire stated that "it appears they have committed [this act] many times before, as indicated by the strung up infants behind them." The image was created by longtime collaborator Vince Locke and is frequently identified as one of the most gruesome album covers of all time. Metal Blade Records president Brian Slagel called it one of the greatest album covers he has ever seen. Former vocalist Chris Barnes claims his jaw "dropped to the floor" upon first sight of the album's artwork, and believes it to be "the ultimate death metal album cover." Current vocalist George Fisher recalled his first time seeing the artwork: "I saw that cover and was like, 'oh my -- damn. That has got to piss some people off.' [...] It's one thing to have people dying in your [albums], well you start messing with children, and people start getting pissed off." Original guitarist Bob Rusay told Decibel in 2008 that "when you look at her lying on the table and her arm sliding off her bone, it gets you."

== Cultural impact and legacy ==
Butchered at Birth is considered to be a highly controversial album in the history of the death metal genre. Cannibal Corpse drummer Paul Mazurkiewicz believes the album to be the band's "most notorious to date"; some record stores reportedly refused to sell the album to patrons under the age of 18. According to Metal Blade Records president Brian Slagel: "We had been through controversy before with the whole PMRC thing in the '80s, so that was nothing new. [...] I actually like the fact that people were shocked at it all." In spite of censorship issues early on, the album's cover artwork is now considered to be iconic. In 2014, an internet meme depicting celebrity chef Gordon Ramsay screaming at the zombies in the artwork made rounds on Twitter. In 2024, Loudwire named the album's cover artwork as one of the "31 Scariest Metal Album Covers of All Time". Staff writer Joe DiVita said: "This album was released when death metal was still finding its way and confirmed the worst nightmares of parents."

Retrospective reviews of the album have been mostly positive. Alex Henderson of AllMusic gave the album four stars out of five and wrote: "The rockers are one-dimensional, but then [again], they never claimed to be anything else. This band's obvious goal was to deliver the musical equivalent of B-movie horror flick, and on that level, the album is outrageously successful." In 2020, Chris Krovatin of Kerrang! ranked Butchered as the best Cannibal Corpse album. He said: "While some bands have a sophomore slump, Cannibal Corpse used their second album to up the ante on everything that made them unique. [...] No words can accurately describe the hideous, gut-ripping power of Butchered At Birth -- you just have to experience it yourself, and try not to puke while doing so." In 2023, original vocalist Chris Barnes himself named the album as among his favorite death metal albums of all time, along with Leprosy, Seven Churches and Slowly We Rot. He said of the album: "I'm going to have to [...] kind of pat myself on the back. That was a huge album in death metal as far as our twist on the whole thing and I think it influenced a lot of people just as Possessed influenced a lot of bands to move in a certain direction."

In 2026, original guitarist Jack Owen cited the album from his catalog that he was the least satisfied with, saying: "The production could be a lot better and the writing process was a little more stress filled, I think. We were trying to make up for sounding simple on the first album, so we overwrote a little bit. So, yeah, I think that's the only one that's hard for me to listen to, to this day... Of the first four albums, it's the one that's probably number four out of those four — for me, anyway."

== Track listing ==
All lyrics written by Chris Barnes. All music written by Cannibal Corpse.

No.	Title	Length
1.	"Meat Hook Sodomy"	5:46
2.	"Gutted"	3:15
3.	"Living Dissection"	4:00
4.	"Under the Rotted Flesh"	5:04
5.	"Covered with Sores"	3:17
6.	"Vomit the Soul" (featuring Glen Benton)	4:30
7.	"Butchered at Birth"	2:45
8.	"Rancid Amputation"	3:16
9.	"Innards Decay"	4:38
Total length:		40:30

2002 remastered edition bonus track
No.	Title	Length
10.	"Covered with Sores" (live)	3:59

== Personnel ==
Cannibal Corpse

- Chris Barnes – vocals
- Bob Rusay – guitars
- Jack Owen – guitars
- Alex Webster – bass
- Paul Mazurkiewicz – drums

Additional musicians

- Glen Benton – backing vocals on "Vomit the Soul"
- Pat O'Brien – lead guitar on live bonus track
- George "Corpsegrinder" Fisher – vocals on live bonus track

Technical personnel

- Scott Burns – production, engineering
- Eddie Shreyer – mastering
- Vincent Locke – artwork, logo
- Joe Giron – photo
- Brian Ames – graphic design

== Charts ==
Chart performance for Eaten Back to Life / Butchered at Birth
Chart (1995)	Peak position
Australian Albums (ARIA)	192
