= Torture Killer =

Finnish death metal band

- Origin: Turku, Finland
- Genres: Death metal
- Years active: 2002–present
- Labels: Dynamic Arts, Karmageddon, Metal Blade
- Members: Tuomas Karppinen; Jari Laine; Kim Torniainen; Tuomo Latvala; Pessi Haltsonen
- Past members: Chris Barnes; Matti Liuke; Taneli Hatakka; Juri Sallinen
- Website: torturekiller.com

Torture Killer is a Finnish death metal band from Turku, formed in 2002.

The band consists of five members: guitarists Jari Laine and Tuomas Karppinen, bassist Kim Torniainen, drummer Tuomo Latvala and the current vocalist Pessi Haltsonen. The band was originally a Six Feet Under cover band adopting their moniker from a Six Feet Under song, but soon began composing and performing original material in the same vein. Chris Barnes, the original singer for Cannibal Corpse and founder of Six Feet Under, officially joined Torture Killer as lead singer in November 2005 and was a part of the recording of the album Swarm!. He left the band in January 2008. Barnes was not involved with their live performances while a part of the band.

The partnership with Barnes continued after the Swarm! period with Jari Laine writing the music for three songs on the 2013 Six Feet Under album Unborn: "Incision"; "Inferno"; "Zombie Blood Curse". A fourth, unreleased Laine-penned track from the Unborn period, "Midnight In Hell", was eventually released on the 2018 digital Six Feet Under album, "Unburied".

Barnes also contributed the lyrics and vocals to the track "Written in Blood" on the 2013 Torture Killer album Phobia.

In June 2022, the band released the title track to their upcoming EP, Dead Inside, which was released on July 29.

== Members ==
=== Current ===
- Jari Laine – guitar (2002–present)
- Tuomo Latvala – drums (2002–present)
- Tuomas Karppinen – guitar (2004–present), bass (2002–2004)
- Kim Torniainen – bass (2004–present)
- Pessi "Nekrosis" Haltsonen – vocals (2011–present)

=== Former ===
- Matti Liuke – vocals (2002–2004)
- Taneli Hatakka – guitar (2002–2004)
- Chris Barnes – vocals (2005–2008)
- Juri Sallinen – vocals (2008–2011)

== Discography ==
=== Studio albums ===
- For Maggots to Devour (2003)
- Swarm! (2006)
- Sewers (2009)
- Phobia (2013)

=== EPs ===
- Torture Killer/Sotajumala (2005) (split EP w/ Sotajumala)
- I Chose Death (2012)
- Dead Inside (2022)
