= Nightmares of the Decomposed =

Studio album by Six Feet Under
- Released: October 2, 2020
- Recorded: 2020
- Studio: Criteria Studios, Miami, Florida (among others)
- Genre: Death metal
- Length: 43:30
- Label: Metal Blade

Six Feet Under chronology
Torment (2017)	Nightmares of the Decomposed (2020)	Killing for Revenge (2024)

Nightmares of the Decomposed is the thirteenth studio album by American death metal band Six Feet Under, released on October 2, 2020, by Metal Blade Records. It is the first album to feature ex-Cannibal Corpse guitarist Jack Owen and guitarist Ray Suhy.

== Reception ==
Professional ratings
Review scores
Source	Rating
Metal Hammer	3.5/5 stars
Distorted Sound	8/10
Metal Injection	6/10
Metal Storm	5/10
All About the Rock	3.5/10

The album received mixed to negative reviews, which criticize the album's production and songwriting. Chris Barnes's vocal performance on the album was heavily criticized, with the performance being described by All About the Rock as "lacking intensity and punch, to say they are lethargic and fatigued would be generous".

Cannibal Corpse bassist Alex Webster spoke positively of the album's instrumentation. He was quoted as follows: "Jack's got a really distinct writing style, and he's got a great groove. But, yeah, there's some cool grooves on there. And the rest of the band too. I really like Jeff Hughell's bass playing. Marco's a killer drummer. So, yeah, it's a cool band. And it sounds really good, the music."

== Track listing ==
All lyrics are written by Chris Barnes; all music is composed by Six Feet Under

No.	Title	Length
1.	"Amputator"	3:42
2.	"Zodiac"	2:53
3.	"The Rotting"	3:15
4.	"Death Will Follow"	2:51
5.	"Migraine"	4:20
6.	"The Noose"	4:29
7.	"Blood of the Zombie"	3:21
8.	"Self Imposed Death Sentence"	3:02
9.	"Dead Girls Don't Scream"	3:15
10.	"Drink Blood Get High"	4:25
11.	"Labyrinth of Insanity"	4:19
12.	"Without Your Life"	3:38
Total length:		43:30

== Personnel ==
Credits are adapted from the album's liner notes.

Six Feet Under

- Chris Barnes – vocals
- Ray Suhy – guitar
- Jack Owen – guitar
- Jeff Hughell – bass
- Marco Pitruzzella – drums

Miscellaneous staff

- Chris Barnes – production
- Chris Carrol – mixing, producing, mastering
- Chaz Najjar – mastering
- Jack Owen – songwriting
- Luke Hunter – artwork

== Charts ==
Chart (2020)	Peak position
German Albums (Offizielle Top 100)	35
Swiss Albums (Schweizer Hitparade)	72
