= Commandment (album) =

Studio album by Six Feet Under
- Released: April 17, 2007
- Genre: Death metal
- Length: 34:26
- Label: Metal Blade
- Producer: Chris Barnes & Erik Rutan

Six Feet Under chronology
13 (2005)	Commandment (2007)	Death Rituals (2008)

Professional ratings
Review scores
Source	Rating
About.com	3.5/5 stars

Commandment is the seventh studio album by American death metal band Six Feet Under. It was released April 17, 2007, on Metal Blade Records. Music videos were released for "Ghosts of the Undead" and "Doomsday". "Doomsday" was premiered on Headbangers Ball on November 10.

== Track listing ==
No.	Title	Length
1.	"Doomsday"	3:48
2.	"Thou Shall Kill"	3:07
3.	"Zombie Executioner"	2:52
4.	"The Edge of the Hatchet"	3:55
5.	"Bled to Death"	3:17
6.	"Resurrection of the Rotten"	2:55
7.	"As the Blade Turns"	3:33
8.	"The Evil Eye"	3:26
9.	"In a Vacant Grave"	3:35
10.	"Ghosts of the Undead"	3:58
Total length:		34:26

== Personnel ==
Six Feet Under

- Chris Barnes – vocals
- Steve Swanson – guitars
- Terry Butler – bass
- Greg Gall – drums

Production

- Produced by Chris Barnes
- Recorded by Chris Carroll
- Engineered by Erik Rutan, Chris Carroll and Javier Valverde
- Mixed and mastered by Erik Rutan at Mana Recording Studios

Artwork

- Photography by Joe Giron
- Cover art by Meran Karanitant
