= Maximum Violence =

Studio album by Six Feet Under
- Released: July 13, 1999
- Genre: Death metal
- Length: 37:13
- Label: Metal Blade Records
- Producer: Brian Slagel

Six Feet Under chronology
Warpath (1997)	Maximum Violence (1999)	Graveyard Classics (2000)

Professional ratings
Review scores
Source	Rating
Allmusic	link

Maximum Violence is the third album by American death metal band Six Feet Under. The album goes back to Chris Barnes' roots in Cannibal Corpse with violent themes/lyrics. It was also the first Six Feet Under album to feature Steve Swanson on guitars and the first to be recorded in C Standard tuning (CFBbEbGC), which they've used ever since except for select occasions.

== Style ==
Steve Huey of AllMusic described the sound as "basically simple riffs alternat[ing] between slow and fast tempos, with ridiculously over-the-top vocals spewing tales of death, dismemberment, and other variations on gore and splatter themes."

== Reception ==
Steve Huey of AllMusic wrote: "The main problem with the record is its lack of variety, in both style and subject matter -- one gets the impression that any riff or lyric could be moved from one song to another with no noticeable difference in the overall effect. Still, if you're a fan of this particular style of death metal, Maximum Violence does deliver the goods."

== Track listing ==
All lyrics are written by Chris Barnes.

No.	Title	Length
1.	"Feasting on the Blood of the Insane"	4:32
2.	"Bonesaw"	3:08
3.	"Victim of the Paranoid"	3:06
4.	"Short Cut to Hell"	3:12
5.	"No Warning Shot"	3:05
6.	"War Machine" (Kiss cover)	4:27
7.	"Mass Murder Rampage"	3:10
8.	"Brainwashed"	2:43
9.	"Torture Killer"	2:43
10.	"This Graveyard Earth"	3:27
11.	"Hacked to Pieces"	3:40
Total length:		37:13

Reissue bonus tracks
No.	Title	Length
12.	"Wrathchild" (Iron Maiden cover)	2:52
13.	"Jailbreak" (Thin Lizzy cover)	4:08
14.	"War is Coming" (Live)	3:15

== Personnel ==
Six Feet Under

- Chris Barnes - vocals
- Steve Swanson - guitars
- Terry Butler - bass
- Greg Gall - drums

Additional musicians

- Paul Booth - Backing vocals on "Feasting on the Blood of the Insane" and "Bonesaw"
- Chris Carroll - Backing vocals on "Bonesaw"

Production

- Produced by Brian Slagel
- Engineered by Chris Carroll, Kieran Wagner and Luly Deya
- Mixed by Brian Slagel and Chris Carroll
- Mastered by Brad Vance

Artwork

- Cover art by Paul Booth
- Graphics by Brian Ames
- Photography by Joe Giron

== Trivia ==
- "Torture Killer" inspired the band Torture Killer.
- The album cover art was illustrated by tattoo artist Paul Booth.
