= Jailbreak (Thin Lizzy song) =

1976 single by Thin Lizzy

- UK single sleeve featuring (L–R): Robertson, Gorham, Lynott and Downey

Single by Thin Lizzy

from the album Jailbreak
- B-side: "Running Back"
- Released: 6 August 1976 (UK)
- Studio: Ramport, London
- Genre: Hard rock
- Length: 4:01
- Label: Vertigo
- Songwriter: Phil Lynott
- Producer: John Alcock

Thin Lizzy singles chronology
| "The Boys Are Back in Town" (1976) | "Jailbreak" (1976) | "Cowboy Song" (1976) |

"Jailbreak" is a song by Thin Lizzy that originally appeared as the title track on their 1976 album of the same name. Along with "The Boys Are Back in Town", it is one of their most popular songs, played frequently on classic rock radio.

The song is typical of the band's music, with the dual lead guitar harmony and Brian Robertson's use of the wah-wah pedal. Phil Lynott's lyrics about a prison break are the typical personification of the "tough guys", also seen in "The Boys Are Back in Town" and the regular concert closer and fan favourite "The Rocker". An alternate version of the song appeared on the bonus disc of the 2011 remastered deluxe edition of the Jailbreak album, featuring a short spoken introduction and additional guitar parts throughout.

== Charts ==
| Chart (1976) | Peak position |
|---|---|
| Australian Singles (Kent Music Report) | 83 |
| UK Singles (Official Charts) | 31 |

== Use in media ==
In December 2008, the song was named the 73rd best hard rock song of all time by VH1.

== Cover versions ==
"Jailbreak"

Song by Anthrax

from the album Anthems
- Released: 1 March 2013
- Genre: Hard rock
- Length: 4:06
- Label: Megaforce
- Songwriter: Phil Lynott
- Producers: Anthrax, Jay Ruston, Rob Caggiano

- The Minnesota-based glam metal band Slave Raider covered the song on their second album, What Do You Know About Rock 'N Roll?, in 1988.
- Master covered the song on their album Collection of Souls in 1993.
- A live cover of the song by Jon Bon Jovi was also used as the b-side to "Queen of New Orleans" in 1997.
- Fu Manchu covered the song as their contribution to a split 7-inch with Fatso Jetson in 1998. It was added to Godzilla's/Eatin' Dust re-issue in 2019.
- American death metal band Six Feet Under covered the song on their Maximum Violence album in 1999.
- Blue Öyster Cult covered the song live (featuring guitarist Al Pitrelli) in 1999.
- Supersuckers performed it on their 2004 live album Live at The Magic Bag, Ferndale, MI
- Gary Moore played the song in the 2005 festival One Night in Dublin which was later released in 2006.
- Dropkick Murphys recorded it for their 2007 album The Meanest of Times, as a bonus track.
- "Jailbreak" is sampled heavily in the 2008 Girl Talk song "Don't Stop."
- Grave Digger released cover on their EP Ballads of a Hangman in 2009.
- Anthrax covered the song on their 2013 EP Anthems.
- Europe covered the song with Scott Gorham as a special guest during Europe's 30th anniversary concert at Sweden Rock Festival in 2013, a concert which was released on DVD and Blu-ray.

== Personnel ==
- Phil Lynott – bass guitar, vocals, acoustic guitar
- Scott Gorham – lead and rhythm guitars
- Brian Robertson – lead and rhythm guitars
- Brian Downey – drums, percussion
