= Crypt of the Devil =

Studio album by Six Feet Under
- Released: May 5, 2015
- Studio: Blaze of Torment Studios, Richmond, VA, and London Bridge Studio, Shoreline, WA
- Genre: Death metal
- Length: 37:00
- Label: Metal Blade
- Producer: Chris Barnes, Cannabis Corpse

Six Feet Under chronology
Unborn (2013)	Crypt of the Devil (2015)	Torment (2017)

Crypt of the Devil is the eleventh studio album by the American death metal band Six Feet Under. It was released on May 5, 2015, on Metal Blade Records. The album features the members of Cannabis Corpse as a studio lineup instead of Six Feet Under's official lineup, with Phil "Landphil" Hall on rhythm guitar and bass, Josh "Hallhammer" Hall on drums and Brandon Ellis on lead guitar, who would end up joining The Black Dahlia Murder.

It's also the first album to feature current guitarist Ray Suhy, who has a guest solo on "Open Coffin Orgy".

== Track listing ==
All lyrics written by Chris Barnes. All music written by Phil Hall.

No.	Title	Length
1.	"Gruesome"	3:07
2.	"Open Coffin Orgy"	4:23
3.	"Broken Bottle Rape"	3:03
4.	"Break the Cross in Half"	3:36
5.	"Lost Remains"	3:26
6.	"Slit Wrists"	3:55
7.	"Stab"	3:53
8.	"The Night Bleeds"	4:10
9.	"Compulsion to Brutalize"	3:18
10.	"Eternal in Darkness"	4:13
Total length:		37:00

== Charts ==
Chart (2015)	Peak position
US Billboard 200	161
US Top Heatseekers	13
US Independent Albums	32
Germany Media Control Charts	42

== Personnel ==
=== Six Feet Under ===
- Chris Barnes – vocals

=== Cannabis Corpse ===
- Brandon Ellis – lead guitar
- Phil "Landphil" Hall – bass, guitar
- Josh "Hallhammer" Hall – drums
- Ray Suhy – guitar solo on "Open Coffin Orgy"

=== Additional musicians ===
- Rebecca Scammon – guitar solo on "Break the Cross in Half"

=== Miscellaneous staff ===
- Brian Armes – graphic design
- Rob Caldwell – mixing
- Alan Douches – mastering
- Mike Hrubovcak – cover art
- Carson Lehman – vocal engineering
