= Alive and Dead =

EP by Six Feet Under
- Released: October 29, 1996
- Genre: Death 'n' roll
- Length: 23:17
- Label: Metal Blade Records

Six Feet Under chronology
Haunted (1995)	Alive and Dead (1996)	Warpath (1997)

Alive and Dead is American death metal band Six Feet Under's first EP, released October 29, 1996. The EP compiles a handful of live songs culled from Six Feet Under's debut album, Haunted (1995), and features three new studio tracks, including a cover of Judas Priest's "Grinder."

== Track listing ==
No.	Title	Length
1.	"Insect"	2:59
2.	"Drowning"	3:02
3.	"Grinder" (Judas Priest cover)	4:02
4.	"Suffering in Ecstasy" (Live Prattland, Switzerland on 7/12/96)	2:34
5.	"Human Target" (Live Prattland, Switzerland on 7/12/96)	3:10
6.	"Lycanthropy" (Live Prattland, Switzerland on 7/12/96)	4:30
7.	"Beneath a Black Sky" (Live Hengelo, Holland on 6/21/96)	3:00
Total length:		23:17

== Personnel ==
Six Feet Under

- Chris Barnes - vocals
- Allen West - guitars
- Terry Butler - bass
- Greg Gall - drums

Production

- Produced by Brian Slagel and Bill Metoyer
- Engineered by Bill Metoyer and Chris Carroll
- Mixed by Brian Slagel and Bill Metoyer
- Mastered by Eddy Schreyer at Oasis Mastering

Artwork

- Cover art and design by Bryan Ames
