= Six Feet Under (band) =

American death metal band

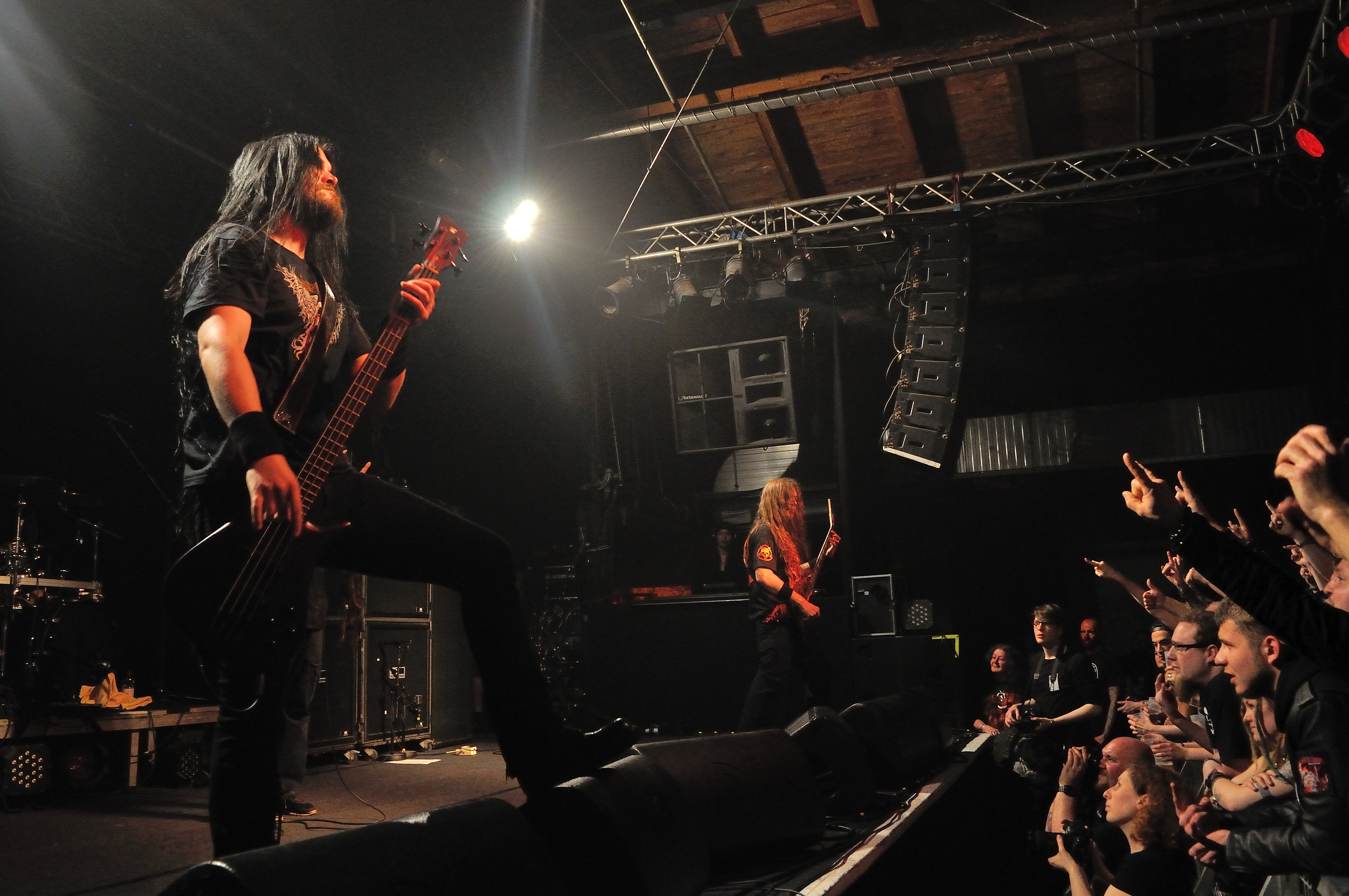
- Performing in 2015 in Berlin, Germany

Background information
- Also known as: S.F.U; 6.F.U
- Origin: Tampa, Florida, U.S.
- Genres: Death metal; death 'n' roll
- Works: Six Feet Under discography
- Years active: 1993–present
- Label: Metal Blade
- Spinoff of: Cannibal Corpse, Obituary
- Members: Chris Barnes; Jeff Hughell; Marco Pitruzzella; Ray Suhy; Jack Owen
- Past members: Terry Butler; Greg Gall; Allen West; Rob Arnold; Kevin Talley; Ola Englund; Steve Swanson
- Website: metalblade.com/sixfeetunder

Six Feet Under, also called S.F.U. and 6.F.U, is an American death metal band from Tampa, Florida, formed in 1993.

The band is currently composed of founding vocalist Chris Barnes, bassist Jeff Hughell, drummer Marco Pitruzzella, and guitarists Ray Suhy and Jack Owen. It was originally a side project formed by Barnes with guitarist Allen West of Obituary, but became a full-time commitment after Barnes was dismissed from Cannibal Corpse in 1995. Six Feet Under has released 15 albums, and is listed by Nielsen Soundscan as the fourth-best-selling death metal act in the U.S.

== History ==
=== Formation, Haunted, and Warpath (1993–1997) ===
After Barnes and West joined forces, they recruited Terry Butler, who knew West from his involvement with Death and Massacre, and Greg Gall, Terry Butler's brother-in-law. Six Feet Under first played in 1993 at clubs, performing mostly cover songs. The band began writing original material in the middle of 1994. Because Barnes was already signed to Metal Blade Records with Cannibal Corpse, Six Feet Under signed to this label and became a side project.

Their first album, Haunted, was released on September 26, 1995. Haunted was produced by Brian Slagel from Metal Blade Records and Scott Burns, who produced all of Cannibal Corpse's albums up to that point. By this point, Chris Barnes had made Six Feet Under his main priority. In 1995, in the process of recording the album Created to Kill, he was fired by Cannibal Corpse because he chose to go on a European tour with Six Feet Under instead of recording vocals for "Created To Kill" and was replaced by Monstrosity's, George "Corpsegrinder" Fisher.

Six Feet Under's next release was the Alive and Dead EP on October 29, 1996. A dual studio/live EP, it contains three studio recordings ("Insect", "Drowning", and a Judas Priest cover, "Grinder") and four tracks from Haunted performed live. The band released their second studio album, Warpath, on September 9, 1997, and would incorporate blends of death metal and death n roll. It would also be the last album to feature Allen West, who would depart shortly after the album's release.

=== Allen West's departure, Maximum Violence and Graveyard Classics (1998–2000) ===
In 1998, Allen West left to rejoin Obituary and was replaced by Steve Swanson. This is the only lineup change that the band had until January 2011. Combined with Barnes' departure from Cannibal Corpse, the arrival of Swanson helped turn Six Feet Under from a mere side-project to a band in its own right.

July 13, 1999 saw the release of Six Feet Under's third studio album, Maximum Violence. The band also recorded a death-metal retooling of the Kiss song "War Machine", which would be featured on the album's tracklist. There were also covers of the Iron Maiden song "Wrathchild" and the Thin Lizzy song "Jailbreak."

During the summer of 2000, Six Feet Under participated in the Vans Warped Tour, a festival that, at the time, usually featured punk rock bands.

Further pursuing their interest in cover songs, Six Feet Under released an album entirely of covers, Graveyard Classics, on October 24, 2000. The songs were given death metal and death n roll makeovers in regards to the timbre of the vocals and instruments, but the original riffs and rhythms of the songs were left intact. Songs include Black Sabbath's "Sweet Leaf", Deep Purple's "Smoke on the Water", and Jimi Hendrix's "Purple Haze".

=== True Carnage and Bringer of Blood (2001–2003) ===
The group's fourth studio album, True Carnage on August 7, 2001, was also their first recording to feature guest artists: Ice-T raps while Barnes roars on "One Bullet Left", and Karyn Crisis joins Barnes for "Sick and Twisted". True Carnage peaked on the Billboard Heatseeker's charts at number 18.

Six Feet Under undertook a lengthy bout of American tours, commencing in the summer of 2002, with supporters Skinless and Sworn Enemy. Their June 14 performance was recorded for a DVD and live album release, Double Dead Redux. September 2002 saw the band touring with Hatebreed. Around Christmas 2002, they participated in some European festivals with bands such as Kataklysm and Dying Fetus.

The band next released Bringer of Blood on September 23, 2003. In addition to his trademark guttural vocals, Barnes also began using higher pitched pig squeal vocals on this release.

=== Graveyard Classics 2, 13, and A Decade in the Grave (2004–2006) ===
Graveyard Classics 2 came out on October 19, 2004. This cover album focused solely on the 1980 AC/DC album Back in Black. AllMusic reviewer Wade Kergan remarked that the death metal-makeover on these forefather songs "are equal parts menace and kitsch... Six Feet Under are obviously having a blast as they rip through them."

Six Feet Under released their sixth studio album on March 22, 2005, entitled 13. While writing the lyrics, Chris Barnes reportedly entered "a vision" from smoking large quantities of marijuana and meditating.

Metal Blade Records issued A Decade in the Grave on October 28, 2005, a five-disc box set. The first two discs are 'best-of' material, the third is a rarities collection, the fourth disc is from one of the band's first concerts back in 1995, and the final disc is a live DVD from 2005.

In November 2005, Chris Barnes joined the Finnish death metal band Torture Killer as lead vocalist for a side project. His new bandmates saw this as a huge compliment, having started out as a Six Feet Under and Obituary cover band. Barnes sung vocals on their 2006 studio album Swarm!.

=== Commandment, Death Rituals, and Graveyard Classics 3 (2007–2010) ===
Six Feet Under toured for the majority of 2006 before hitting the studios to record their next album, Commandment, which was released on April 17, 2007. The album works within the band's formula. According to music critic Chad Bowar, the album has "catchy death metal songs... [that are] crushingly heavy, but also have a great groove to them."

Six Feet Under played Metalfest 2007 tour alongside openers Finntroll, Belphegor, and Nile, their most heavily promoted tour to date. A music video for "Doomsday" aired on MTV2's Headbangers Ball, starting on November 10 of that year.

On December 24, 2007, Six Feet Under announced on their website that they would go to the studio in early 2008 to record a new album. The album, titled Death Rituals, was released on Metal Blade Records on November 11, 2008, in the US, and November 17, 2008, in the UK.

As announced on January 31, 2008, Chris Barnes officially parted ways with Torture Killer, to be replaced by Juri Sallinen. Drummer Greg Gall was currently writing and recording material with a new band called Exitsect, along with guitarist Sam Williams (Denial Fiend, Down by Law), bassist Frank Watkins (Obituary, Gorgoroth), guitarist Joe Kiser (Murder-Suicide Pact, Slap Of Reality) and vocalist Paul Pavlovich (Assück).

Graveyard Classics 3 was released on January 19, 2010.

=== Undead and Unborn (2011–2013) ===
In early 2011, Terry Butler left to join fellow death metal band Obituary. Drummer Greg Gall had also left.

In November 2011, Rob Arnold and Matt Devries posted statements saying they have departed from Chimaira to play in Six Feet Under full-time. However, in 2012, Matt Devries left the band to join Fear Factory, replacing longtime bassist Byron Stroud. The vacant position was subsequently filled by ex-Brain Drill 7-string bassist, Jeff Hughell.

The band's ninth studio album Undead was released on May 22, 2012. It was also announced on the same day that Rob Arnold would be replaced by Swedish guitarist Ola Englund of bands Feared and Scarpoint. They played at Wacken Open Air in August 2012.

The band released their tenth album Unborn on March 19, 2013.

According to a recent interview on March 21, 2013, Barnes is already writing material for the band's next album.

In 2013, guitarist Ola Englund and drummer Kevin Talley departed the band. Marco Pitruzzella took over on drums.

=== Crypt of the Devil and Graveyard Classics IV: The Number of the Priest (2014–2016) ===
On May 5, 2015, Six Feet Under released their eleventh studio album, Crypt of the Devil. On this release Chris Barnes incorporated Phil Hall, Josh Hall and Brandon Ellis from the band Cannabis Corpse for the studio line up.

In April 2015, Jeff Hughell left the Hatefest tour in Europe and Victor Brandt of Entombed filled in as a temporary bassist.

The band released their fourth cover album Graveyard Classics IV: The Number of the Priest on May 27, 2016, with Ray Suhy on guitar and bass and Josh Hall on drums, both from Cannabis Corpse, appearing on the album.

In 2016 longtime guitarist Steve Swanson left the band and was replaced by Cannabis Corpse member Ray Suhy.

=== Torment, Unburied, Nightmares of the Decomposed, Killing for Revenge, and Next to Die (2017–present) ===
On January 10, 2017, the band announced their twelfth studio album, Torment, which was released by Metal Blade Records on February 24. The album marked the debut of drummer Marco Pitruzzella with the addition of Jeff Hughell who recorded guitar and bass for the album. Torment was received poorly by fans and critics alike, citing lazy songwriting and poor production. On February 28, former Cannibal Corpse and Deicide guitarist Jack Owen joined the band.

The band released a digital-only EP on July 6, 2018, titled Unburied, consisting of previously unreleased material from the recording sessions of their prior four albums. That same year, Chris announced that the band was writing material for their 13th album. The album title, Nightmares of the Decomposed, was revealed on April 21 and was released on October 2, 2020.

Six Feet Under's fourteenth studio album, Killing for Revenge, was released on May 10, 2024. In early 2025, Six Feet Under co-headlined a US tour with Nile. The band is currently working on a new album for a tentative 2026 release. They are scheduled to tour North America in July and August with Kataklysm and Wormhole.

On March 11, 2026, the band announced their fifteenth album, Next to Die, which was released on April 24. They also released the lead single from the album, "Unmistakable Smell of Death". On April 6, the band released the album's second single, "Mutilated Corpse in the Woods".

== Musical style ==
Six Feet Under has been described as death metal and death 'n' roll. According to AllMusic, "[Six Feet Under's] sonic trademark offers filthy, plodding, straight-ahead grooves and crunchy blastbeats along with controversial lyrics from founder and vocalist Chris Barnes; the latter continually revolve around themes of graphic violence, gore, and death, exemplified to an extreme degree."

== Members ==
Current members

- Chris Barnes − vocals (1993−present)
- Jeff Hughell − bass (2012−present), guitars (2016−2017, studio)
- Marco Pitruzzella − drums (2013−present)
- Ray Suhy − guitars (2015−present)
- Jack Owen − guitars (2017−present)

Former members

- Terry Butler − bass (1993−2011)
- Greg Gall − drums (1993−2011)
- Allen West − guitars (1993–1998)
- Steve Swanson − guitars (1998−2016)
- Kevin Talley − drums (2011–2013)
- Rob Arnold − guitars, bass (2011–2012)
- Ola Englund − guitars (2012–2013)

Session members

- Brandon Ellis − guitars (2014−2015)
- Phil Hall − guitars, bass (2014−2015)
- Josh Hall − drums (2014−2015)

Touring musicians

- Jeff Golden − bass (2016, 2019, 2025-present)
- Ruston Grosse − drums (2026)

Former touring musicians

- Matt DeVries − bass (2011−2012)
- Victor Brandt − bass (2015)

Timeline

== Discography ==
Studio albums

- Haunted (1995)
- Warpath (1997)
- Maximum Violence (1999)
- True Carnage (2001)
- Bringer of Blood (2003)
- 13 (2005)
- Commandment (2007)
- Death Rituals (2008)
- Undead (2012)
- Unborn (2013)
- Crypt of the Devil (2015)
- Torment (2017)
- Nightmares of the Decomposed (2020)
- Killing for Revenge (2024)
- Next to Die (2026)
