= Graveyard Classics 2 =

Studio album (cover of Back in Black by AC/DC) by Six Feet Under
- Released: October 19, 2004
- Genre: Death 'n' roll
- Length: 42:04
- Label: Metal Blade

Six Feet Under chronology
Bringer Of Blood (2003)	Graveyard Classics 2 (2004)	A Decade In The Grave (2005)

Professional ratings
Review scores
Source	Rating
Allmusic	2.5/5 stars

Graveyard Classics 2 is the second cover album by Six Feet Under. It is an album cover version of AC/DC's 1980 album Back in Black.

== Track listing ==
All songs by Brian Johnson, Angus Young and Malcolm Young.

No.	Title	Length
1.	"Hells Bells"	5:11
2.	"Shoot to Thrill"	5:17
3.	"What Do You Do for Money Honey"	3:36
4.	"Given the Dog a Bone"	3:32
5.	"Let Me Put My Love into You"	4:14
6.	"Back in Black"	4:24
7.	"You Shook Me All Night Long"	3:30
8.	"Have a Drink on Me"	3:58
9.	"Shake a Leg"	4:03
10.	"Rock and Roll Ain't Noise Pollution"	4:19
Total length:		42:04

== Personnel ==
Six Feet Under

- Chris Barnes - vocals
- Steve Swanson – guitars
- Terry Butler – bass
- Greg Gall – drums

Production

- Produced by Chris Barnes
- Engineered and mixed by Chris Caroll
