= Killing for Revenge =

Studio album by Six Feet Under
- Released: May 10, 2024
- Recorded: 2024
- Studio: Badlands Recording, Denver, Colorado
- Genre: Death metal
- Length: 46:44
- Label: Metal Blade

Six Feet Under chronology
Nightmares of the Decomposed (2020)	Killing for Revenge (2024)	Next to Die (2026)

Killing for Revenge is the fourteenth studio album by American death metal band Six Feet Under, released on May 10, 2024, by Metal Blade Records.

== Background and recording ==
The album was recorded in Badlands Recording, Denver, Colorado. In an interview with New Noise Magazine, Chris Barnes stated that he wrote the lyrics to the album collaboratively with Jack Owen. Unplanned, the lyrical themes ended up being centred around violence and revenge, leading to the album title.

== Reception ==
Professional ratings
Review scores
Source	Rating
MetalSucks	2.5/5
Metal Forces	4/10
New Noise	5/5 stars
Distorted Sound	3/10
Lambgoat	4/10
Loud Flash	55%
RAMzine	3/5 stars

The album received generally mixed reviews upon release, with critics noting the improvement in Chris Barnes' vocals, with some criticising the songwriting and production quality. New Noise Magazine gave the album a 5 star rating, describing the album as "crushing", stating "Chris Barnes completely shatters the soul with his guttural growls".

== Track listing ==
All music is composed by Six Feet Under

No.	Title	Length
1.	"Know-Nothing Ingrate"	2:22
2.	"Accomplice to Evil Deeds"	2:18
3.	"Ascension"	4:30
4.	"When the Moon Goes Down in Blood"	3:46
5.	"Hostility Against Mankind"	3:55
6.	"Compulsive"	3:33
7.	"Fit of Carnage"	3:29
8.	"Neanderthal"	4:54
9.	"Judgement Day"	3:34
10.	"Bestial Savagery"	3:51
11.	"Mass Casualty Murdercide"	2:49
12.	"Spoils of War"	3:46
13.	"Hair of the Dog" (Nazareth cover)	3:57
Total length:		46:44

== Personnel ==
Credits are adapted from the album's liner notes.

Six Feet Under

- Chris Barnes – vocals, lyrics (tracks 2–11)
- Ray Suhy – guitar
- Jack Owen – guitar, lyrics (tracks 1–3, 5–12)
- Jeff Hughell – bass
- Marco Pitruzzella – drums

Guest/Session

- Jason Suecof - guitars (lead), track 8

Miscellaneous staff

- Brian Slagel – executive producer
- Brian Ames - layout
- Chaz Najjar – mixing, mastering
- Jack Owen – songwriting, producer
- Vince Locke – artwork

== Charts ==
Chart (2015)	Peak position
Austria Ö3 Austria Top 75	58
