= True Carnage =

Studio album by Six Feet Under
- Released: August 7, 2001
- Studio: Hit Factory Criteria (Miami)
- Genre: Death metal; death 'n' roll
- Length: 34:18
- Label: Metal Blade Records
- Producer: Brian Slagel

Six Feet Under chronology
Graveyard Classics (2000)	True Carnage (2001)	Bringer of Blood (2003)

True Carnage is the fourth album by American death metal band Six Feet Under. The album contains fan favourites such as "The Day the Dead Walked", "One Bullet Left" and "Sick and Twisted". It's also the only album in Six Feet Under's discography to feature 7 string guitars and is the lowest tuned album, to A Standard (ADGCFAD).

Martin Popoff of Lollipop Magazine wrote that "Brian Slagel’s production is both power-packed and warmly rumbling, and the band respond with a coterie of riffs that offer both variety and drinkability."

== Track listing ==
No.	Title	Length
1.	"Impulse to Disembowel"	3:11
2.	"The Day the Dead Walked"	2:15
3.	"It Never Dies"	2:41
4.	"The Murderers"	2:40
5.	"Waiting for Decay"	2:41
6.	"One Bullet Left" (featuring Ice-T)	3:31
7.	"Knife, Gun, Axe"	3:56
8.	"Snakes"	2:44
9.	"Sick and Twisted" (featuring Karyn Crisis)	3:51
10.	"Cadaver Mutilator"	2:34
11.	"Necrosociety"	4:10
Total length:		34:18

== Personnel ==
Six Feet Under

- Chris Barnes - vocals
- Steve Swanson - guitars
- Terry Butler - bass
- Greg Gall - drums

Guest musicians

- Ice-T - guest vocals on "One Bullet Left"
- Karyn Crisis - guest vocals on "Sick and Twisted"

Production

- Produced by Brian Slagel
- Engineered by Chris Carroll, Kieran Wagner, Marc Lee and Dave Hyman
- Engineered drums by Donald Tardy
- Recorded and mixed by Dave Schiffman at The Hit Factory Criteria Miami
- Mastered by Eddy Schreyer at Oasis Mastering

Artwork

- Cover art and layout by Paul Booth
