= 13 (Six Feet Under album) =

Studio album by Six Feet Under
- Released: March 22, 2005
- Recorded: 2004
- Genre: Death metal
- Length: 35:55
- Label: Metal Blade
- Producer: Chris Barnes

Six Feet Under chronology
A Decade In The Grave (2005)	13 (2005)	Commandment (2007)

Professional ratings
Review scores
Source	Rating
Allmusic	3/5 stars
Blabbermouth	(6.5/10)

13 is the sixth studio album by American death metal band Six Feet Under. The album was released in 2005 on Metal Blade Records.

== Track listing ==
No.	Title	Length
1.	"Decomposition of the Human Race"	3:42
2.	"Somewhere in the Darkness"	3:53
3.	"Rest in Pieces"	3:08
4.	"Wormfood"	3:45
5.	"13"	3:07
6.	"Shadow of the Reaper"	3:38
7.	"Deathklaat"	2:35
8.	"The Poison Hand"	2:57
9.	"This Suicide"	2:21
10.	"The Art of Headhunting"	3:33
11.	"Stump"	3:11
Total length:		35:55

Digipack also includes "Live San Francisco 2002" on CD2.
No.	Title	Length
1.	"The Day the Dead Walked"	2:20
2.	"The Murderers"	2:42
3.	"Waiting for Decay"	2:55
4.	"Impulse to Disembowel"	3:29
5.	"Feasting on the Blood of the Insane"	4:49
6.	"No Warning Shot"	3:22
7.	"Silent Violence"	3:26
8.	"The Enemy Inside"	4:06
9.	"Victim of the Paranoid"	3:37
10.	"Journey into Darkness"	2:15
11.	"Revenge of the Zombie"	2:50
12.	"Manipulation"	2:49
13.	"Torn to the Bone"	2:53
14.	"4:20"	5:28
15.	"Bonesaw"	3:17
16.	"Hacked to Pieces"	4:03

== Personnel ==
Six Feet Under

- Chris Barnes – vocals
- Steve Swanson – guitars
- Terry Butler – bass
- Greg Gall – drums

Production

- Produced by Chris Barnes
- Engineered by Chris Carroll, Patrick Magee and Ryan Yanero
- Mixed by Chris Carroll

Artwork

- Photography by Joe Giron
- Graphic design, layout and cover art by Meran Karanitant
