= Unborn (album) =

Studio album by Six Feet Under
- Released: March 19, 2013
- Recorded: 2012−2013
- Genre: Death metal
- Length: 36:01
- Label: Metal Blade
- Producer: Chris Barnes, Six Feet Under

Six Feet Under chronology
Undead (2012)	Unborn (2013)	Crypt of the Devil (2015)

Professional ratings
Review scores
Source	Rating
About.com	4.5/5 stars
Decibel Magazine	5/10 stars

Unborn is the tenth studio album by American death metal band Six Feet Under. The album was released on March 19, 2013.

Unborn features writing credits from guitarist Jari Laine of Torture Killer and features guest guitarist Ben Savage of Whitechapel. It is Six Feet Under's first album to feature bassist Jeff Hughell, the only one to feature guitarist Ola Englund and the last to feature guitarist Steve Swanson, guitarist Rob Arnold and drummer Kevin Talley. Chris Barnes' nephew Ryley Dipaola performed drums on the vinyl-only bonus track, "Illusions".

== Track listing ==
All lyrics written by Chris Barnes.

No.	Title	Music	Length
1.	"Neuro Osmosis"	Ben Savage	3:10
2.	"Prophecy"	Ola Englund	3:19
3.	"Zombie Blood Curse"	Jari Laine	4:08
4.	"Decapitate"	Ben Savage	2:50
5.	"Incision"	Jari Laine	2:48
6.	"Fragment"	Ben Savage	2:55
7.	"Alive to Kill You"	Steve Swanson	3:17
8.	"The Sinister Craving"	Ben Savage	2:16
9.	"Inferno"	Jari Laine	2:53
10.	"Psychosis"	Rob Arnold	3:47
11.	"The Curse of the Ancients"	Ola Englund	4:37
Total length:			36:01

== Personnel ==
Six Feet Under

- Chris Barnes − vocals
- Steve Swanson − guitar
- Ola Englund − guitar
- Jeff Hughell − bass
- Kevin Talley − drums

Additional musicians

- Rob Arnold − guitar on "Inferno" & "Psychosis"
- Ben Savage – guitar on "Neuro Osmosis","Decapitate","Fragment" & "The Sinister Craving"
- Ryley Dipaola – guitar & drums (vinyl bonus track "Illusions")

Production

- Produced by Six Feet Under
- Drums recorded by Eyal Levi, Orlando Villasenor and Mark Lewis at Audiohammer Studios
- Bass recorded by Zack Ohren at Castle Ultimate Studios
- Guitars recorded by Brandon Cagle
- Vocals recorded by Chaz Najjar
- Mixed & mastered by Chris "Zeuss" Harris at Planet Z Studios

Artwork

- Cover art by Dusty Peterson
- Layout by Bryan Ames
