= Haunted (Six Feet Under album) =

Studio album by Six Feet Under
- Released: September 26, 1995
- Genre: Death metal
- Length: 38:37
- Label: Metal Blade
- Producer: Brian Slagel, Scott Burns and Six Feet Under

Six Feet Under chronology
Haunted (1995)	Alive and Dead (1996)

Haunted is the debut album by American death metal band Six Feet Under. It was released via Metal Blade Records in 1995, just before Chris Barnes' departure from Cannibal Corpse.

The picture used for the album art is from the cover of the 1990 film The Haunting of Morella.

== Tracklist ==
All tracks are written by Chris Barnes and Allen West

No.	Title	Length
1.	"The Enemy Inside"	4:17
2.	"Silent Violence"	3:33
3.	"Lycanthropy"	4:41
4.	"Still Alive"	4:04
5.	"Beneath a Black Sky"	2:50
6.	"Human Target"	3:30
7.	"Remains of You"	3:22
8.	"Suffering in Ecstasy"	2:44
9.	"Tomorrow's Victim"	3:34
10.	"Torn to the Bone"	2:46
11.	"Haunted"	3:10
Total length:		38:37

== Personnel ==
Six Feet Under

- Chris Barnes – vocals
- Allen West – guitars
- Terry Butler – bass
- Greg Gall – drums

Production

- Produced by Scott Burns and Brian Slagel
- Mixed and engineered by Scott Burns
- Mastered by Eddy Schreyer at Future Disc

Artwork

- Band photo by Chris Coxwell
- Photography by Ann-Marie Blood
- Design and computer imaging by Bryan Ames
- Cover art by Jim Warren

== Reception ==
Professional ratings
Review scores
Source	Rating
AllMusic	4/5 stars

The album's lyrics have been described as "thought provoking." Chris Barnes' vocals have been described as "bowel-shuddering roars."
