= Bringer of Blood =

Studio album by Six Feet Under
- Released: September 23, 2003
- Recorded: March 30 − April 30, 2003
- Studio: Morrisound Studios, Tampa, Florida
- Genre: Death metal
- Length: 42:31
- Label: Metal Blade
- Producer: Chris Barnes

Six Feet Under chronology
True Carnage (2001)	Bringer of Blood (2003)	Graveyard Classics II (2004)

Professional ratings
Review scores
Source	Rating
Allmusic	2.5/5 stars

Bringer of Blood is the fifth studio album by Florida death metal band Six Feet Under. The album achieved a peak position of number 22 on Top Heatseekers for two weeks and number 20 on Independent Albums. It's also the first Six Feet Under album to be self-produced by Chris Barnes.

The German limited edition digipack CD in slipcase comes with a bonus DVD titled "The Making of Bringer of Blood" and two bonus tracks. (See Bringer des Blutes, and Unknown) A music video was made for the song "Amerika the Brutal".

== Track listing ==
All songs by Six Feet Under.

No.	Title	Length
1.	"Sick in the Head"	4:11
2.	"Amerika the Brutal"	3:01
3.	"My Hatred"	4:22
4.	"Murdered in the Basement"	2:19
5.	"When Skin Turns Blue"	3:27
6.	"Bringer of Blood"	2:54
7.	"Ugly"	2:58
8.	"Braindead"	3:44
9.	"Blind and Gagged"	3:09
10.	"Claustrophobic"	2:50
11.	"Escape from the Grave" (ends at 3:57; hidden track "White Widow" begins at 8:09)	9:36
Total length:		42:31

Reissue
No.	Title	Length
12.	"Bringer des Blutes" (Bonus German version of Bringer of Blood)	2:55
13.	"White Widow"	1:22

== Personnel ==
Six Feet Under

- Chris Barnes – vocals
- Steve Swanson – guitars
- Terry Butler – bass
- Greg Gall – drums

Production

- Produced by Chris Barnes
- Engineered by Chris Carroll
- Mixed by Chris Barnes, Chris Carroll and Brian Slagel
- Mastered by Brad Vance

Artwork

- Artwork by David Aronson
- Graphics by Brian Ames
- Photography by Joe Giron

== See also ==
- Six Feet Under
- Chris Barnes
