= Warpath (Six Feet Under album) =

Studio album by Six Feet Under
- Released: September 9, 1997
- Genre: Death metal, death n roll
- Length: 41:25
- Label: Metal Blade Records
- Producer: Brian Slagel

Six Feet Under chronology
Alive and Dead (1996)	Warpath (1997)	Maximum Violence (1999)

Warpath is the second studio album by American death metal band Six Feet Under. Tracks on this album include "Death or Glory", which is a cover of a song originally done by Holocaust, and "4:20", a song four minutes and twenty seconds in length which, according to the liner notes, was recorded at 4:20 PM on April 20, 1997. It is the last album to feature founding guitarist Allen West.

== Style ==
Chris Barnes' growls on the album have been likened to Godzilla. The guitar riffs of Allen West have been described as "snail-paced."

== Critical reception ==
Professional ratings
Review scores
Source	Rating
AllMusic	4/5 stars
Rock Hard	10/10

In 2005, Warpath was ranked number 334 in Rock Hard magazine's book The 500 Greatest Rock & Metal Albums of All Time.

Jason Birchmeier of AllMusic said, "the simplicity of the riffs and their slow pace may just as well inspire criticism as it does celebration, given the fact that most death metal bands pride themselves on velocity."

== Track listing ==
All songs written by Chris Barnes and Allen West, except "Death or Glory" (Holocaust cover).

No.	Title	Length
1.	"War Is Coming"	3:15
2.	"Nonexistence"	3:34
3.	"A Journey into Darkness"	2:17
4.	"Animal Instinct"	4:49
5.	"Death or Glory"	2:52
6.	"Burning Blood"	3:58
7.	"Manipulation"	2:51
8.	"4:20"	4:20
9.	"Revenge of the Zombie"	2:50
10.	"As I Die"	3:54
11.	"Night Visions"	3:07
12.	"Caged and Disgraced"	3:34
Total length:		41:25

== Personnel ==
Six Feet Under

- Chris Barnes – vocals
- Allen West – guitars
- Terry Butler – bass
- Greg Gall – drums

Production

- Produced by Brian Slagel
- Engineered by Bill Metoyer and Mitchell Howell
- Mixed by Brian Slagel at Morrisound Studios
- Mastered by Eddy Schreyer at Oasis Mastering

Artwork

- Artwork and logo by Chris Barnes
- Graphics by Bryan Ames
- Photography by Tim Hubbard
