= Death Rituals =

Studio album by Six Feet Under
- Released: November 11, 2008
- Recorded: May–September 2008 at Morrisound Studios, Tampa, Florida
- Genre: Death metal
- Length: 49:10
- Label: Metal Blade
- Producer: Chris Barnes

Six Feet Under chronology
Commandment (2007)	Death Rituals (2008)	Graveyard Classics 3 (2010)

Professional ratings
Review scores
Source	Rating
About.com	3.5/5 stars
AllMusic	3/5 stars
Blabbermouth.net	7/10 stars

Death Rituals is the eighth studio album by American death metal band Six Feet Under. It was released on November 11, 2008, through Metal Blade Records. It is also available in a limited digipak edition with three live bonus tracks.

On October 6, 2008, the song "Shot in the Head" was posted at Brave Words & Bloody Knuckles as part of their "Knuckle Tracks" online player. The song was removed on October 12, 2008.

Another song titled "Seed Of Filth" was available for streaming on the Metal Blade Records MySpace page from October 21, 2008. The song was also released as the album's first single. A video was shot on October 31, 2008, at Gasoline Alley in Largo, Florida.

This was the last album of original material to feature founding bassist Terry Butler and drummer Greg Gall. It is also their longest album to date, clocking in at just under 50 minutes.

== Recording and production ==
The recording process of the album began in May 2008 at the Morrisound Studios in Tampa, Florida with Chris Carroll.

"It's great to be back in the studio and we feel really psyched to lay these new songs down. They are some of the best stuff we have come up with, and can't wait for all of our fans to hear the new stuff!!"

— Chris Barnes

The album has so far proved slightly more popular amongst fans than Commandment. Kerrang also gave the album a rare '5K' rating.

== Track listing ==
No.	Title	Length
1.	"Death by Machete"	3:45
2.	"Involuntary Movement of Dead Flesh"	3:28
3.	"None Will Escape"	3:24
4.	"Eulogy for the Undead"	4:17
5.	"Seed of Filth"	4:58
6.	"Bastard" (Mötley Crüe cover)	3:25
7.	"Into the Crematorium"	3:42
8.	"Shot in the Head"	5:02
9.	"Killed in Your Sleep"	4:37
10.	"Crossroads to Armageddon"	2:07
11.	"Ten Deadly Plagues"	5:11
12.	"Crossing the River Styx"	1:15
13.	"Murder Addiction"	3:57
Total length:		49:10

Digipak edition bonus tracks
No.	Title	Length
14.	"Victim of the Paranoid" (Live)
15.	"Revenge of the Zombie" (Live)
16.	"Human Target" (Live)

== Personnel ==
Six Feet Under

- Chris Barnes – vocals
- Steve Swanson – guitars
- Terry Butler – bass
- Greg Gall – drums

Session musicians

- Iggy Pop – voice message on "Shot in the Head"

Production

- Produced by Chris Barnes
- Mixed by Chris Carroll, Toby Wright, James Musshorn, and Ian Blanch
- Tracked drums by Bill Metoyer
- Engineered by Alex Graupera, Sean Burnett, and Jason Blackerby
- Mastered by Alan Douches

Artwork

- Graphic design, cover artwork, and layout by Meran Karanitant
- Photography by Christian Girstmair
