= Chris Barnes (musician) =

American death metal vocalist (born 1967)

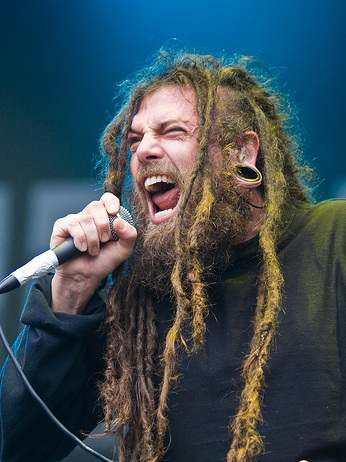
- Barnes in 2009

Background information
- Born: December 29, 1967 (age 58); Buffalo, New York, U.S.
- Genres: Death metal; death 'n' roll
- Occupations: Vocalist; songwriter; record producer
- Years active: 1986–present
- Member of: Six Feet Under
- Formerly of: Cannibal Corpse; Torture Killer

Chris Barnes (born December 29, 1967) is an American death metal vocalist, lyricist and producer who currently serves as the frontman of Six Feet Under. Artistically, he is noted for his low guttural vocals and explicitly violent lyrics.

Barnes was the co-founder and original lead vocalist and lyricist of Cannibal Corpse, staying with the band from 1988 to 1995 and recording four studio albums, including Tomb of the Mutilated (1992). He later founded the Florida death metal band Six Feet Under, for whom he also provides lead vocals and songwriting. In addition, he has also appeared on Torture Killer's second album Swarm! Barnes designed the original Cannibal Corpse logo, the Six Feet Under logo and the artwork for the band's 1997 album Warpath.

Barnes is considered to be among the most influential extreme metal vocalists of all time. His vocal style on early Cannibal Corpse releases is frequently emulated by practitioners of the slam and brutal death metal subgenres.

== Early life and education ==
Barnes began smoking marijuana at an early age. His father grew and sold the drug, and he recalled feeling like his "world opened up" upon smoking it for the first time, smoking roach clips lifted from his father's ash trays. He recalled feeling lucky growing up in a progressive household where his dad grew and sold cannabis, and he said "I remember the original Acapulco Gold strains, and Panama Red, the real Red, that were eradicated."

Barnes first met bandmate Paul Mazurkiewicz when the former moved to the neighborhood with his mother. According to Barnes, the two were not friends at first. Barnes recalled being struck in the groin by Mazurkeiwicz during an altercation between the two while playing street football. The two began smoking marijuana and listening to heavy metal together soon thereafter.

Barnes graduated high school in 1986. He found employment at a warehouse after entering the workforce. A friend of his during this time had drug problems, and he claims to have spent time in underprivileged neighborhoods to see how people lived there. According to Barnes in the book Precious Metal: "I put myself in weird situations just to get something out of it."

== Musical career ==
=== Cannibal Corpse ===
Barnes started his career at the age of 19. His first band was a death/thrash band called Tirant Sin, which was formed in 1986 in his hometown of Buffalo, New York. Other members of Tirant Sin included Paul Mazurkiewicz (drums), Bob Rusay, Cam V and Joe Morelli (guitars) and Rich Ziegler (bass guitar). In 1986, Barnes left Tirant Sin to join another New York-based death/thrash metal band named Leviathan that recorded the four-track demo "Legions of the Undead" in 1987, re-released on the 2005 Six Feet Under box set A Decade in the Grave.

Tirant Sin recorded three demos, all privately released: "Desecration of the Graves" in February 1987, "Chaotic Destruction" in fall 1987 with Dennis John on vocals, and "Mutant Supremacy" in 1988. Barnes appeared only on the third demo, when he re-joined Tirant Sin in January 1988.

After Tirant Sin, Barnes co-founded Cannibal Corpse. Barnes wrote all of the lyrics on the albums Butchered at Birth, Tomb of the Mutilated, and The Bleeding and wrote the lyrics on Eaten Back to Life with the rest of the band helping. The band relocated to Tampa, Florida in 1995. Barnes stated in a 2025 interview that the move was ratified without his knowledge, and he was not given a say in the decision.

Barnes became notorious for his explicitly violent lyrics. He professed to being interested in horror, gore, and serial killings.

Barnes was fired from Cannibal Corpse in 1995 during the recording sessions for Vile due to creative and personal differences with the rest of the band. He attributed his leave to being ridiculed by the others, as well as personal differences that could not be worked out. His final vocal recordings with the band were for the "Created to Kill" sessions which were later re-recorded by his replacement George Fisher for the Vile album. The "Created to Kill" demo featuring Barnes was eventually released as part of the 15 Year Killing Spree box set released in 2003. Barnes later commented in 2008 that being fired was "pretty memorable but in a good way", as he was previously not able to write the way he wanted.

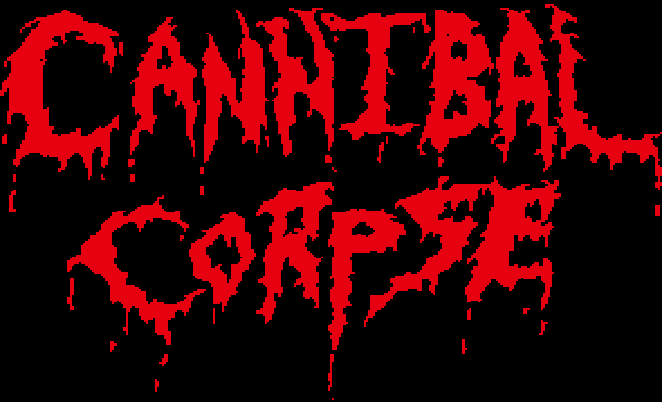
Barnes designed the original Cannibal Corpse logo, which was used until 1995.

=== Six Feet Under ===
Barnes' departure from Cannibal Corpse allowed him to devote his full attention to the band Six Feet Under, which had been his side project since 1993. The group initially featured members from Obituary. The group's first album Haunted was released in 1995. The group's second album Warpath was released in 1997. The group's third album Maximum Violence was released in 1999. The group's fourth album Graveyard Classics was released in 2000. They released True Carnage in 2001. They released Double Dead in 2002. Bringer of Blood was released in 2003. In 2005, Six Feet Under released 13, their sixth full-length album, produced by Barnes. In the same year, Six Feet Under released A Decade in the Grave, a box set highlighting the previous ten years of Six Feet Under.

Six Feet Under released the album Commandment on April 17, 2007.

On November 11, 2008, Six Feet Under released another album, Death Rituals. It saw the band returning to Morrisound Studios in Tampa, Florida, with Chris Carroll producing and mixing by Toby Wright (Slayer, Korn, In Flames, Fear Factory, etc.) and the return of old friend Bill Metoyer, who recorded the band's album Warpath, who helped out with recording of the drums.

In November 2011, Rob Arnold and Matt DeVries posted statements saying they had left Chimaira to play in Six Feet Under full-time. However, in 2012, DeVries moved on to Fear Factory, replacing longtime bass guitarist Byron Stroud. The vacant position was subsequently filled by the ex-Brain Drill 7-string bass guitarist, Jeff Hughell.

The band's ninth studio album, Undead, was released on May 22, 2012. Rob Arnold was later replaced by Ola Englund. The band stated that Arnold would remain a central writing partner and collaborator on future Six Feet Under releases.

Six Feet Under's tenth album Unborn was released on March 19, 2013, and their eleventh record Crypt of the Devil was released May 5, 2015. Nightmares of the Decomposed followed in 2020. Killing for Revenge followed in 2024.

On March 11, 2026, the band announced their fifteenth album, Next to Die, set for release on April 24. They also released the lead single from the album, "Unmistakable Smell of Death". This was followed on April 6 by the release of the second single, "Mutilated Corpse In The Woods".

== Artistry ==
=== Vocal styles ===
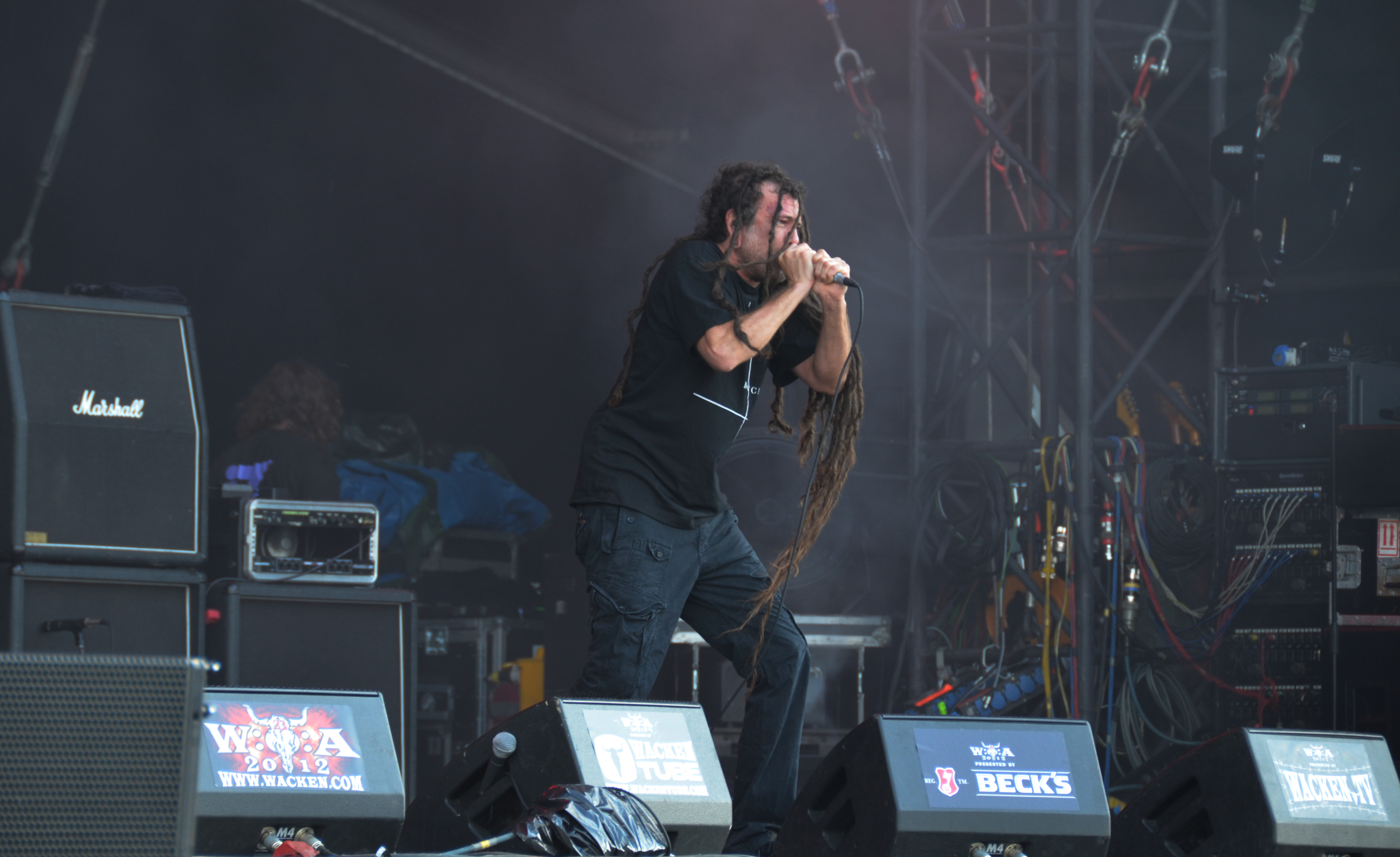
Barnes with Six Feet Under at Wacken Open Air 2012

Will Hodgkinson of The Times said that Barnes "took metal vocals from the scary to the ridiculous," and his tone has been favorably described as "hideous." On early Cannibal Corpse releases, he employed a thrash metal vocal style, which Alex Webster called "a different type of death metal singing," and compared it to the likes of Kreator and The Accused. By the band's second album Butchered at Birth, his vocals were drastically lower. Barnes has stated that he developed his guttural vocal style as an attempt to blend into the music, or "become another instrument", as the band composed increasingly darker and more aggressive songs. Many within the death metal scene believe Barnes to be among the first to employ the deeper guttural style in their growls, along with Chuck Schuldiner.

Though his vocals on Butchered and Tomb of the Mutilated were characterized as an indecipherable "gurgle," beginning with The Bleeding, publications noted an increase in clarity in his enunciation. He recalled feeling like he wanted to enunciate more clearly on The Bleeding because the music was more clearly pronounced. At the time, he wanted to prove to himself that he could still do heavy singing, but he also wanted people to understand his lyrics and storylines, which were important to him. Following his tenure with Cannibal Corpse, Barnes became widely known for his "eee" squeal on Six Feet Under releases, which would become his trademark. According to Will Hodgkinson of The Times, Barnes' squeal "brings to mind pigs in slaughterhouses awaiting their fate."

Although his vocal performances on later Six Feet Under releases have been called "a shell of his Corpse glory," Barnes has defended the evolution in vocal styles throughout his career as simply due to stylistic choice and personal preference. Rather than sticking to one style on every album, he prefers to adjust his vocals to fit the nuances of each song and explore new approaches. His gutturals started when hearing aspects of the riffs such as the syncopation, and he wanted his vocals to be "melted together" with the music. He compared his vocal changes to an actor, loved by a fan for a particular role, who changes their technique or feeling in their next role. According to Barnes, the way he writes his vocals comes from the work presented to him, and the difference in vocal sound on each album is intentional.

=== Lyrics ===
Chris Barnes wrote plenty of entry-level slasher stuff like "Meat Hook Sodomy", but also entered truly nauseating territory with "Addicted To Vaginal Skin" and "Entrails Ripped From A Virgin's Cunt". The personification of the victims as female made the songs even more uneasy listening, naturally enough: what was even worse was when children became lyrical targets in the song "Necropedophile". This hadn't been done before, and the subject is still too much for most sane people. [...] Grim stuff, depending on how seriously you take it.

— Joel McIver of The Quietus (March 13, 2012)

Publications have called Barnes a "deranged lyrical genius," and Dark Angel drummer Gene Hoglan has credited Barnes as one of the "progenitors of the gore style." Graham Hartmann of Loudwire said, "lyrically, he was a deranged, murderous savage with a vivid imagination for extinguishing life, possessing an unquenchable bloodlust." Barnes' lyrics generally follow a fictional, narrative format, heavily drawing influence from horror fiction and true crime. On his lyrical content on the first four Cannibal Corpse albums, he said: "It wasn't meaningless jargon written down to fast music", as he always took pride in writing storylines.

Barnes assessed his emotional approach to writing lyrics that pertain to the topic of death. He described people forcing themselves to not think of death because "it's the most horrifying experience in life" and it makes them do more with life. On two or three people who asked if his lyrics were metaphors, he said "I find this to be about lifestyle, more than it is about death." He said he writes from the standpoint of sitting in the darkness by oneself alone at night, thinking about what the last moment of being alive is like.

According to Barnes, he did not write for shock value, as he felt that shock alone did not work, but instead wrote to evoke emotions like fear. He explained that he felt that it was exciting, interesting and matched the band's extreme music. "Entrails Ripped From a Virgin's Cunt" from Tomb of the Mutilated is considered one of his more extreme lyrical pieces, with Metal Hammer calling the line "mutilated with a machete" one of the song's "more upbeat, uplifting moments."

Barnes said the controversy surrounding his lyrics on early Cannibal Corpse releases nearly got him shot and killed before a 1994 concert in Los Angeles. He recalled gang members storming the band's tour bus, one of whom had just gotten out of San Quentin and had a .38 caliber stuffed into his belt lining. The gang member said "We're gonna kill you if you keep writing about this stuff", and Barnes tried to talk to him calmly and said "Hey, I respect your opinion" before their tour manager got the gang members off the bus.

== Impact ==
=== Legacy and influence ===
Barnes is recognized by some as "one of the first real guttural death metal vocalists." In 2024, Will Hodgkinson of The Times named Barnes as one of the best voices in heavy metal, and noted that there exist "entire YouTube compilations dedicated to [his] signature “eee” squeal." Previously in 2015, Joe Davita of Loudwire joked: "We never claimed that Chris Barnes was a well-adjusted man." Barnes himself expressed pride in everything he did, and he thought the first Cannibal Corpse records he was involved with "will continue to be thought of as one of the purest moments of death metal history".

=== Cannibal Corpse reunion discussions ===
In response to questions from fans regarding a possible reunion between Barnes and Cannibal Corpse in 2006, Alex Webster dismissed the idea, expressing a lack of desire from any members to do anything with Barnes again. That same year, he said: "It's nothing against him, but we prefer to move forward rather than live in the past." In 2013, he said "Doing songs where Chris was onstage with us and George wasn't would be too much" and noted that Fisher had been the singer for about 18 years by that point.

In 2013, Webster said that although he and Barnes had been cordial when the two have encountered each other at festivals, Cannibal Corpse would also not likely participate in a tour with Six Feet Under either, saying "you do your thing, we'll do ours." Barnes himself commented in 2017 that he had no animosity towards them, nor did it seem they had any to him, but he speculated that they thought both of them touring together would be too confusing. However, in 2024, Jack Owen stated his belief that Barnes would be capable of cordiality towards George Fisher should the two bands ever tour together. Early in 2025, Barnes recalled that he had invited Webster to play guest bass on Six Feet Under's renditions of "Hammer Smashed Face" and "Stripped Raped and Strangled" during the band's US tour that year, but Webster declined. Barnes said: "We knew he wasn't going to do it, but I told him 'those songs are so important to us all, I thought you might want to.' But I don't know what grudge they're holding against me, but they just don't like me, so it's okay."

== Views ==
Barnes is a proponent of marijuana legalization. In a 2012 interview, he said "I believe [cannabis] was placed here on earth by a higher power, or another being, or an alien being, or something that has a plan for us." He pointed to the benefits of marijuana and the importance of the cannabinoidal system, while he found alcohol and tobacco to be deadly and unnecessary despite those being legal and "shoved down our throats".

Barnes has openly expressed his belief in the supernatural and life after death. He told Noisecreep in 2012 about communicating with the dead and seeing things relating to spirituality and the afterlife, and he said "that is brought out in what I write because I believe it to be fact and truthful, about the soul, the spirit. And the ugly things I see in life remind me about all the beautiful things that we forget about and how precious and short those things are to our experience."

Barnes has been openly critical about the current state of modern death metal, going as far to say he "despises" what the genre has become. This was met with backlash from some in the death metal scene. At a Cannibal Corpse concert in Reading, Pennsylvania, the crowd was heard chanting "fuck Chris Barnes" for nearly 20 seconds, to which George Fisher responded: "You said it, not me." However, Six Feet Under bandmate Jack Owen stated in a 2024 interview that Barnes has since adopted a more amicable stance on the genre's development. It was erroneously reported in 2022 that Barnes wrote "every death metal singer sucks except for me" in a Facebook post. In actuality, this was posted by a troll account.

Barnes has called some of the survivors of the 2018 Parkland school shooting "crisis actors" and the coronavirus a "false flag".

== Feuds ==
=== Seth Putnam ===
Anal Cunt vocalist Seth Putnam claimed that he heckled Barnes during a Six Feet Under set, which resulted in Barnes cutting the set short. An altercation between the two ensued; ultimately, Six Feet Under's roadies ganged up on Putnam while Barnes fled to his tour bus. Putnam released the song "Chris Barnes Is a Pussy" as retaliation to the incident.

Putnam is quoted by the staff of BrooklynVegan as saying he would have liked to meet Barnes and Hatebreed frontman Jamey Jasta "so [he] can beat the living shit out of both of their little pussy asses."

Despite the feud, Putnam was a fan of Six Feet Under's music and stated that "Murdered in the Basement" was his favorite song of theirs.

=== Cattle Decapitation ===
On November 7, 2012, while on tour with Metal Blade labelmates Cattle Decapitation on the Autumn Apocalypse Tour, Barnes reportedly "sucker punched" Cattle Decapitation frontman Travis Ryan during a verbal altercation, resulting in Cattle Decapitation dropping off the tour. Ryan stated that Barnes had been making unsavory remarks about Cattle Decapitation onstage the night prior, and that he punched him mid-sentence when confronted about it. Travis said that Barnes performed a "Rocky dance" and retreated after punching him. Travis took to Facebook after the incident, where he called Barnes a "fucking hack". In response, Barnes mocked the band's vegetarianism in a since-deleted Twitter post, where he said: "If you eat tofu you'll get you're [sic] ass kicked in a fight. #knocked out."

One day later, Barnes stated that the bands had a dispute relating to merchandise which was then settled. However, according to Barnes, Ryan had been talking badly about him amongst the crew and musicians. Barnes remarked that Ryan should "eat a veggie burger", leading to Ryan aggressively confronting him after a show, which Barnes considered fighting words. However, Barnes denied both punching Ryan and running out of the room, instead claiming he simply walked out since further violence was unnecessary after Ryan was on the floor.

In response, Ryan said they had never toured with Six Feet Under due to "horror stories" around Barnes, but agreed on the basis of no merch restrictions such as price matching or limits on designs so they could make up for a missed tour. According to Ryan, Barnes tried to impose restrictions; he was shut down with emails between booking agents asserting no restrictions, but Cattle Decapitation agreed to limit their designs to avoid drama after talking with Six Feet Under's tour manager. After Cattle Decapitation sold more merch, Barnes made comments on stage about vegetarians which Ryan found to be attacks against Cattle Decapitation, leading to an argument between the two about respect. Barnes then hit Ryan in the jaw as he was talking and left.

No charges were filed against Barnes in relation to the incident.

== Personal life ==
At some point, Barnes relocated from Florida to Seattle, Washington. He said that he heard many cool stories about when his mother lived there in the 1970s, and he always felt comfortable there while touring. He also stated that the legality of cannabis in the state strongly influenced his choice of destination.

Barnes had been widely known for his marijuana use, which he would use for meditative and artistic purposes. In a 2017 interview, he called cannabis his best friend for his entire life, and said that everything he does is with the use of "medicinal and spiritual use of Cannabis." In 2024, Barnes stated that he had quit smoking marijuana and drinking alcohol due to personal choice.

Barnes has owned several dogs throughout his life.

== Discography ==
Six Feet Under

- Haunted (1995)
- Alive and Dead (1996)
- Warpath (1997)
- Maximum Violence (1999)
- Graveyard Classics (2000)
- True Carnage (2001)
- Double Dead Redux (live) (2003)
- Bringer of Blood (2003)
- Graveyard Classics 2 (2004)
- 13 (2005)
- A Decade in the Grave (box set) (2005)
- Commandment (2007)
- Death Rituals (2008)
- Graveyard Classics 3 (2010)
- Undead (2012)
- Unborn (2013)
- Crypt of the Devil (2015)
- Graveyard Classics IV: The Number of the Priest (2016)
- Torment (2017)
- Unburied (2018)
- Nightmares of the Decomposed (2020)
- Killing for Revenge (2024)
- Next to Die (2026)

Cannibal Corpse

- Cannibal Corpse demo (1989)
- Eaten Back to Life (1990)
- Butchered at Birth (1991)
- Tomb of the Mutilated (1992)
- Hammer Smashed Face EP (1993)
- The Bleeding (1994)
- Created to Kill (Vile demo) (1995)
- 15 Year Killing Spree box set (2003)
- Centuries of Torment: The First 20 Years video (2008)

Torture Killer

- Swarm! (2006)
- Phobia (2013) Backing vocals on "Written in Blood"

IHATE

- IHATE (2014)

Cannabis Corpse

- From Wisdom to Baked (2014) Backing vocals on "Individual Pot Patterns"

Gorguts

- Considered Dead (1991) Backing vocals on "Bodily Corrupted", "Rottenatomy" & "Hematological Allergy"

Skribbal

- Black Eyed Children (2021)

Opening introduction on "The Retribution"

Incite

- Built to Destroy (2019) Backing vocals on "Poisoned by Power"
