= Undead (Six Feet Under album) =

Studio album by Six Feet Under
- Released: May 22, 2012
- Recorded: Audio Hammer Studios, 2011–2012
- Genre: Death metal
- Length: 40:13
- Label: Metal Blade
- Producer: Mark Lewis

Six Feet Under chronology
Death Rituals (2008)	Undead (2012)	Unborn (2013)

Undead is the ninth studio album by American death metal band Six Feet Under. It is their first album to feature drummer Kevin Talley and guitarist Rob Arnold, both were members of the band Chimaira before joining Six Feet Under.

== Background ==
Vocalist Chris Barnes commented of the recording: "I'm in pretty much the best head space I've been in since myself and [former guitarist] Allen West started this band in 1993. I'm super excited about the new record. It's a rejuvenation; it's a rebirth of Six Feet Under, and fans will definitely latch on to my excitement and how focused I am in the lyrics I've written… The hypocrisies of daily life, things that affect us that spawn aggression, loneliness, sadness, there's a lot of emotions going on across the record, and I guess that the dark horror that humans cause is my niche."

== Reviews ==
The album was called "the best thing SFU have recorded since Maximum Violence," in an 8/10 review by Decibel magazine. Terrorizer magazine wrote that, "Ugly riffs slip and slide amidst the primordial ooze summoned forth by Chris' guttural incantations, and the drums flail in the background like some tentacle monstrosity from beyond; this is truly an unearthly noise and glorious in its heaving absurdity."

AllMusic rated the album 3 out of 5 stars.

== Track listing ==
All lyrics written by Chris Barnes. All music written by Rob Arnold.

No.	Title	Length
1.	"Frozen at the Moment of Death"	3:42
2.	"Formaldehyde"	2:47
3.	"18 Days"	2:40
4.	"Molest Dead"	3:13
5.	"Blood on My Hands"	3:37
6.	"Missing Victims"	3:57
7.	"Reckless"	3:04
8.	"Near Death Experience"	2:56
9.	"Delayed Combustion Device"	3:07
10.	"The Scar"	3:27
11.	"Vampire Apocalypse"	3:54
12.	"The Depths of Depravity"	3:49
Total length:		40:13

== Personnel ==
Six Feet Under

- Chris Barnes - vocals
- Steve Swanson - lead guitar
- Rob Arnold - lead and rhythm guitar, bass
- Kevin Talley - drums

Production

- Produced by Mark Lewis at Audiohammer Studios
- Drum engineering by Kevin Talley and Mark Lewis
- Guitar engineering by Rob Arnold and Chaz Najjar
- Vocal engineering by Chris Barnes and Chaz Najjar
- Mixed by Eyal Levi and Jason Suecof at Audiohammer Studios
- Mastered by Alan Douches at West West Side Music

Artwork

- Cover art by Dusty Peterson
- Layout by Bryan Ames
