= Terry Butler =

American bassist

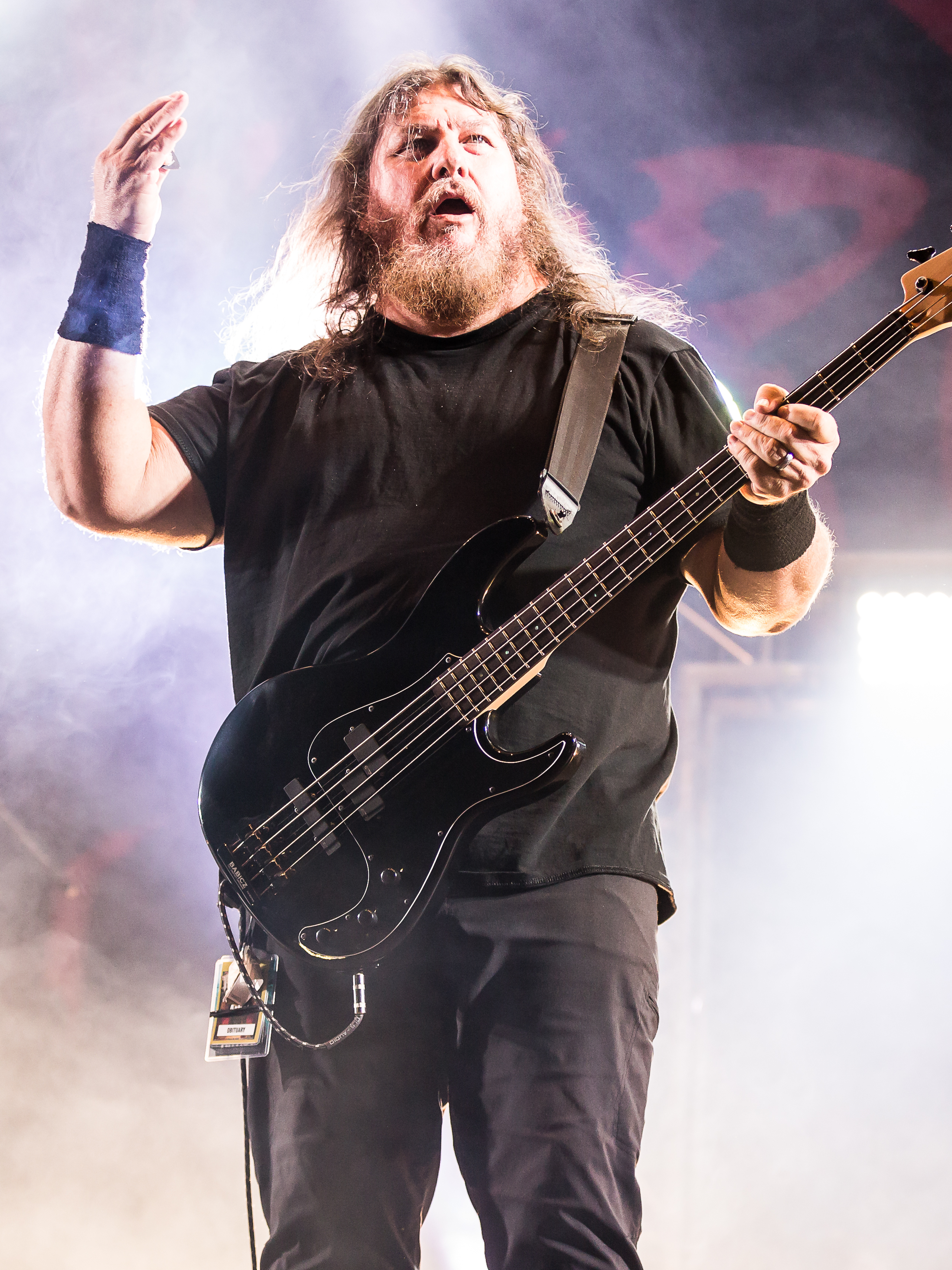
- Butler in 2023

Background information
- Born: Terrence Butler
- Origin: Tampa, Florida, U.S.
- Genres: Death metal
- Occupation: Musician
- Instrument: Bass guitar
- Years active: 1986–present
- Member of: Obituary; Inhuman Condition
- Formerly of: Death; Six Feet Under; Massacre

Terry Butler is an American musician who is currently the bassist for the death metal bands Obituary and Inhuman Condition. He was also a member of Six Feet Under, Massacre, and Death.

He is married with three children, and is brother-in-law of former Six Feet Under bandmate Greg Gall. On May 7, 2019, Butler's then 27-year-old daughter, Jona Wright, died in a single-vehicle car accident after her car came off the road and was overturned multiple times, also leaving Butler's two grandsons, ages 6 and 10 at the time, who were also in the vehicle, with minor injuries.

== Discography ==
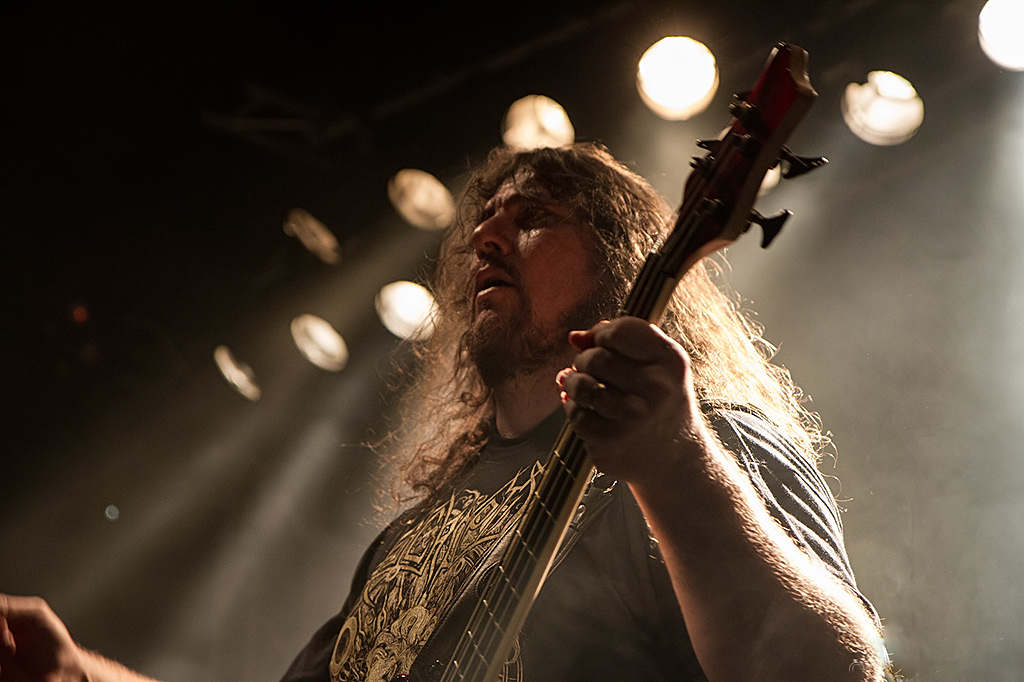
Butler with Obituary in 2012

=== Death ===
- Spiritual Healing (1990)

Though Butler is also credited on Death's 1988 release Leprosy, he did not play on the album. The bass was instead performed by sole constant member Chuck Schuldiner, with Butler joining the band after the album was completed; though Schuldiner defended Butler's inclusion on the album's credits, stating "Terry contributed to the songwriting as well".

=== Massacre ===
- From Beyond (1991)
- Inhuman Condition (1992)
- Back from Beyond (2014)

=== Six Feet Under ===
- Haunted (1995)
- Alive and Dead (1996)
- Warpath (1997)
- Maximum Violence (1999)
- Graveyard Classics (2000)
- True Carnage (2001)
- Bringer of Blood (2003)
- Graveyard Classics 2 (2004)
- 13 (2005)
- Commandment (2007)
- Death Rituals (2008)
- Graveyard Classics 3 (2010)
- Wake the Night! Live in Germany (2011)

=== Obituary ===
- Inked in Blood (2014)
- Ten Thousand Ways to Die (2016)
- Obituary (2017)
- Dying of Everything (2023)

=== Inhuman Condition ===
- Rat God (2021)
- Fearsick (2022)
- Panic Prayer (2023)
