= Steve Swanson (guitarist) =

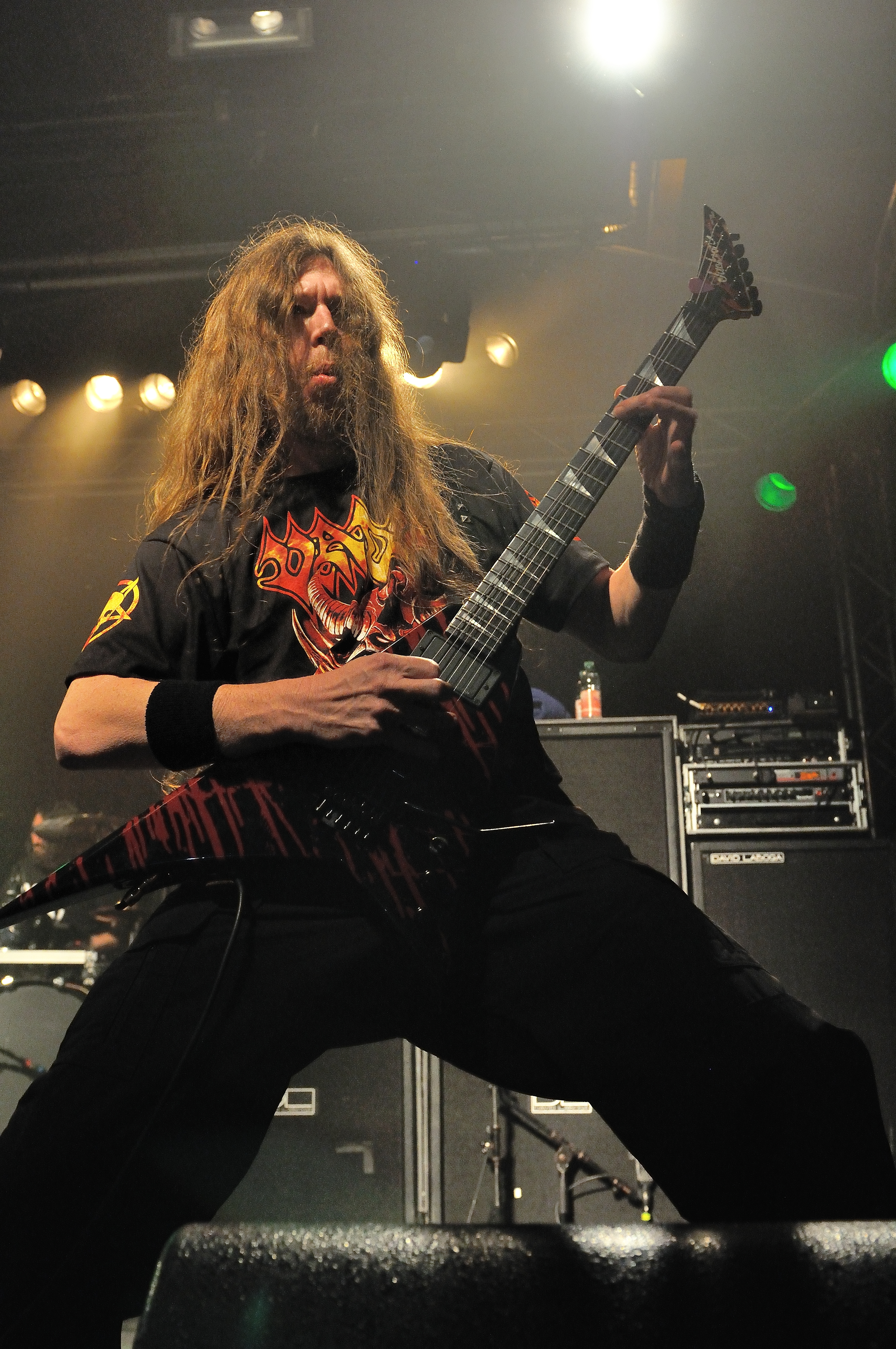
- Swanson in 2015

Background information
- Born: Tampa, Florida, U.S.
- Genres: Death metal
- Occupation: Musician
- Instrument: Guitar
- Years active: 1998–present
- Formerly of: Six Feet Under; Massacre

Steve Swanson is an American musician, best known as the former lead guitarist for the death metal band Six Feet Under. He took over guitar duties from Allen West (of Obituary), who left the band in late 1997. Before Swanson joined Six Feet Under, he was in Massacre, another Florida death metal band

He has two children.

In early December 2008, Swanson's house was broken into, and a Mesa Boogie Dual Rectifier, six guitars, a Line 6 guitar amp, and a Hewlett Packard laptop were stolen.

== Discography ==
=== Six Feet Under ===
- Maximum Violence (1999)
- Graveyard Classics (2000)
- True Carnage (2001)
- Bringer of Blood (2003)
- Graveyard Classics 2 (2004)
- 13 (2005)
- Commandment (2007)
- Death Rituals (2008)
- Graveyard Classics 3 (2010)
- Wake the Night! Live in Germany (2011)
- Undead (2012)
- Unborn (2013)
