= Global Evisceration =

Video by Cannibal Corpse
- Released: 2011
- Recorded: Live recordings: Gothic Theater in Englewood, Colorado, 3 May 2010, Sunshine Theater in Albuquerque, New Mexico, 8 May 2010
- Genre: Death metal
- Length: 168 minutes
- Label: Metal Blade
- Director: Denise Korycki
- Producer: Denise Korycki

Cannibal Corpse chronology
Centuries of Torment: The First 20 Years (2008)	Global Evisceration (2011)

Global Evisceration is the fourth video album by American death metal band Cannibal Corpse, released in 2011.

== Track listing ==
1. "Evisceration Plague"
2. "Scattered Remains, Splattered Brains"
3. "Make Them Suffer"
4. "Death Walking Terror"
5. "Devoured by Vermin"
6. "Priests of Sodom"
7. "Scalding Hail"
8. "I Will Kill You"
9. "Staring Through the Eyes of the Dead"
10. "Hammer Smashed Face"
11. "Stripped, Raped, and Strangled"

Bonus

1. "The Cryptic Stench"
2. "Disfigured"
3. "Pit of Zombies"
4. "Pounded into Dust"
5. "A Skull Full of Maggots"
6. "The Wretched Spawn"

=== Extras ===
- Prepare to Die
- The Gas Chamber
- Peregrination
- Metal Brothers
- Eaten Back to Life on the Road
- Fan Photos
- The Throne Room
- Savage Sobriquets
- Code Words and Comedy
- Rest for the Wicked
- Gifts of Gore

== Personnel ==
- George "Corpsegrinder" Fisher – vocals
- Pat O'Brien – lead guitar
- Rob Barrett – rhythm guitar
- Alex Webster – bass
- Paul Mazurkiewicz – drums
