= Vile (album) =

Studio album by Cannibal Corpse
- Released: May 21, 1996
- Recorded: January 1996
- Studios: Morrisound Recording, Tampa, Florida
- Genres: Death metal, brutal death metal
- Length: 37:40
- Labels: Metal Blade; Victor Entertainment (JPN)
- Producers: Scott Burns; Cannibal Corpse

Cannibal Corpse chronology
The Bleeding (1994)	Vile (1996)	Gallery of Suicide (1998)

Vile is the fifth studio album by American death metal band Cannibal Corpse, released on May 21, 1996, through Metal Blade Records.

Vile was recorded at Morrisound Recording in Tampa, Florida by Scott Burns. It was the band's last album to be recorded by Burns and is the last album to feature guitarist Rob Barrett until 2006's Kill. The album had a tumultuous production process, as original vocalist Chris Barnes was dismissed from the band during its recording sessions and replaced by George "Corpsegrinder" Fisher of Monstrosity. Fisher stated that he did not know for certain that he had been hired for the band until after the album had been completed. Vile became the band's first release to chart on the US Billboard 200, reaching number 151.

Musically, Vile largely abandons the groove element that defined its predecessor The Bleeding, instead opting for a style more consistent with brutal death metal. Despite this, the album's cover artwork and song titles are considered to be less extreme as on previous releases by the band. The album explores psychological horror themes in addition to graphic violence.

The album was re-released in 2006 with new liner notes and a bonus DVD (titled "Vile Live") featuring a full concert from the Vile tour, during which many songs from the album are performed.

== Background and recording ==
Vile was originally titled Created to Kill. During the album's production, vocalist Chris Barnes was dismissed from the band due to creative differences. Drummer Paul Mazurkiewicz said the band wanted to evolve lyrically and musically, but Barnes was unable to meet the band's needs and was controlling and stubborn. However, Barnes had already tracked vocals for seven songs; the 15 Year Killing Spree box set released in 2003 includes the Created to Kill EP of demo tracks with Barnes' original vocals.

The band hired Monstrosity vocalist George "Corpsegrinder" Fisher to re-record Barnes' vocal tracks. Fisher was initially extremely nervous but quickly gained control of his voice. Due to time constraints, Fisher contributed lyrics for two tracks; Webster and Mazurkiewicz, who had contributed lyrics on the band's debut album, wrote most of the lyrics for the album. Mazurkiewicz said Barnes had not allowed anyone else to contribute lyrics, but he and Webster enjoyed writing the lyrics for the album.

Lead guitarist Rob Barrett had suggested to Lee Harrison of Monstrosity that Harrison might need to perform drums on the album, as Mazurkiewicz was struggling to record the material. Ultimately, Mazurkiewicz appeared on the album.

During the Vile sessions, "The Undead Will Feast" from Eaten Back to Life was re-recorded with Fisher on vocals. This version of the song would first appear as the only bonus track on a Japanese import edition of Vile and then on the Worm Infested EP in 2003.

== Music and lyrics ==
The album is seen as a return to the brutal death metal sound of the band's previous releases with hints of technical death metal, and as a departure from the catchier groove-oriented style of The Bleeding. Both it and its followup Gallery Of Suicide and The Wretched Spawn are considered by fans as the band's most technical releases. Greg Pratt of Exclaim! said, "Vile practically mocks that album's groove and open space with an oppressive onslaught of full-on, no-nonsense, blinders-on extreme metal." Chris Krovatin of Kerrang! wrote: "Though the band’s sound had begun to enter the horrific, kinetic tone that it would champion from here on, on Vile it retains some of the insulated basement-track production of Cannibal's early releases." The album has been noted for its complex song structures.

According to Malcolm Dome of Metal Hammer, Fisher's "vocals seemed to feed off the dynamism, freshness and vitality that lit up the music." Bassist Alex Webster said Fisher was able to perform a rapid vocal delivery akin to Kreator, Dark Angel, and Tom Araya. Loudwire described his scream at the beginning of "Devoured by Vermin" as a "tortured shriek".

Vile is the band's first album to use Bb standard tuning, as opposed to Eb standard tuning on all prior releases (although a few of the album's tracks are in C# standard).

Vincent Jefferies of Allmusic noted Vile's album art and song titles, while "gruesome and extreme to the max", are "toned down" in comparison to previous releases by the band. Fisher described the album's fifth track "Bloodlands" as having more of a psychological horror theme as opposed to the usual graphic violence themes of earlier releases.

== Reception and legacy ==
Professional ratings
Review scores
Source	Rating
AllMusic	4/5 stars
Collector's Guide to Heavy Metal	6/10
Metal Hammer	2/5 stars

AllMusic wrote, "Fisher brought a vocal dynamism and character that livened up the band's six-year-old sound. Fisher's ability to match the musical intensity and rhythm of Vile's more complicated assemblages of riffs created a more sophisticated yet equally tortuous essence."

Vile was the first death metal album to appear on the Billboard 200 chart, debuting at No. 151. Cannibal Corpse drummer Paul Mazurkiewicz said, "It may have been partly due to the leg work we'd done with The Bleeding, and also because we’d matured as a band as well. But it was a great moment when Vile charted. Here was proof that people had embraced what we were doing, in bigger numbers than ever. And it was a vindication of our decision to bring in the new man." He believes Vile to be a turning point in the band's history, and possibly one of the band's most crucial releases, which the band may not have survived without.

Created to Kill was eventually released as part of the band's official boxset. According to Mazurkiewicz, virtually everyone who heard the demos understood why Barnes was fired. They released it not to embarrass him, but to keep the band's history and let people make up their own minds.

In 2020, Chris Krovatin of Kerrang! wrote, "The mixture of fast-paced numbers like 'Mummified In Barbed Wire' and uncommonly slow tracks like 'Bloodlands' confused some fans, but shows the band taking awesome risks that would pay off in their evolution. And then, there's the cover, arguably Vincent Locke's masterpiece and perhaps the greatest example of an album's art matching its title."

In 2024, Joe DiVita of Loudwire ranked Vile as the worst Cannibal Corpse album: "Building on Barnes' foundation, Corpsegrinder brought a more intelligible delivery along with unquestionably better high screams. The hype surrounding Vile wound up proving to be insurmountable and Corpse handed in a musically competent record marred by a hollow production and a lack of personality that the Barnes era had in spades."

== Track listing ==
No.	Title	Lyrics	Music	Length
1.	"Devoured by Vermin"	Webster	Rob Barrett; Alex Webster	3:13
2.	"Mummified in Barbed Wire"	Webster	Webster	3:09
3.	"Perverse Suffering"	Paul Mazurkiewicz	Jack Owen	4:14
4.	"Disfigured"	George Corpsegrinder Fisher; Webster	Webster	3:48
5.	"Bloodlands"	Webster	Webster	4:20
6.	"Puncture Wound Massacre"	Fisher; Mazurkiewicz; Webster	Webster	1:41
7.	"Relentless Beating" (instrumental)		Webster	2:14
8.	"Absolute Hatred"	Barrett	Barrett	3:05
9.	"Eaten from Inside"	Owen	Owen	3:43
10.	"Orgasm Through Torture"	Mazurkiewicz	Webster	3:41
11.	"Monolith"	Mazurkiewicz; Webster	Webster	4:24
Total length:				37:40

Bonus track
No.	Title	Lyrics	Length
12.	"The Undead Will Feast" (re-recording of song from Eaten Back to Life)	Chris Barnes: Owen; Webster	2:54

== Personnel ==
All credits for Vile are taken from the album's liner notes.

Cannibal Corpse

- George Fisher – vocals
- Alex Webster – bass
- Jack Owen – guitar
- Rob Barrett – guitar
- Paul Mazurkiewicz – drums

Production

- Scott Burns – engineer, mixing
- Mike Fuller – mastering
- Brian James – design
- Vincent Locke – artwork, illustrations
- Brian Slagel – executive producer

== 2007 Vile Live DVD track listing ==
=== February 3, 1997 ===
1. "Perverse Suffering"
2. "Stripped, Raped and Strangled"
3. "Covered with Sores"
4. "Monolith"
5. "Addicted to Vaginal Skin"
6. "Force Fed Broken Glass"
7. "Fucked with a Knife"
8. "Gutted"
9. "Bloodlands"
10. "Shredded Humans"
11. "Staring Through the Eyes of the Dead"
12. "A Skull Full of Maggots"
13. "Devoured by Vermin"
14. "Hammer Smashed Face"

=== February 4, 1997 ===
1. "Pulverized"
2. "Puncture Wound Massacre"
3. "Mummified in Barbed Wire"
4. "Orgasm Through Torture"

== Created to Kill ==
Several of the songs from the finished album were written before Barnes was fired, and were recorded in demo form with him on vocals.

These tracks were collected for disc three of the 15 Year Killing Spree box set.

Tracklist

1. "Unburied Horror" (Disfigured) – 3:28
2. "Mummified in Barbed Wire" – 3:07
3. "Gallery of the Obscene" (Orgasm Through Torture) – 3:37
4. "To Kill Myself" (Eaten from Inside) – 3:41
5. "Bloodlands" – 4:29
6. "Puncture Wound Massacre" – 1:43
7. "Devoured by Vermin" – 3:11

== Chart positions ==
Chart (1996)	Peak position
Australian Albums (ARIA)	182
US Billboard 200	151
US Heatseekers Albums (Billboard)	10
