= Vince Locke =

American comic book artist

- Born: Vincent Locke; 1966 (age 59–60) Michigan, U.S.
- Areas: Penciler, inker
- Notable works: Deadworld; A History of Violence

Vincent Locke (/lɒk/; born 1966) is an American comic book artist known for his work on Deadworld and A History of Violence and for his ultraviolent album covers for death metal band Cannibal Corpse.

== Biography ==
Locke began work in 1986 illustrating Deadworld, a zombie horror comic that soon became an underground hit.

Since then, his illustrative talents in comics have included The Sandman, American Freak, Batman, Witchcraft: Le Terreur, The Spectre, and A History of Violence, which was later made into a movie directed by David Cronenberg and starring Viggo Mortensen. He has done work for 2000 AD, including two Judge Dredd stories.

Locke has also created extremely violent watercolor paintings that have been used as album covers by American death metal band Cannibal Corpse. Despite decades of collaboration, the band has stated that they have never met Locke in person.

Locke has also provided illustrations for the "weird erotica" of dark-fantasy author Caitlín R. Kiernan, providing black and white artwork strongly reminiscent of Aubrey Beardsley's style for her collections Frog Toes and Tentacles and Tales from the Woeful Platypus, as well as for Kiernan's monthly Sirenia Digest. Recent projects have included illustrating the first issue of Polluto: The Anti-Pop Culture Journal. He is also known for providing art work for RPGs by White Wolf Publishing and Wizards of the Coast. A press release dated May 6, 2012 announced Locke's graphic novel collaboration with writer Jasmine Lyraka for the Wagnerian opera metal project Lyraka.

== Bibliography ==
Comics work includes:

- American Freak: A Tale of the Un-Men (with Dave Louapre, 5-issue limited series, Vertigo, 1994)
- A History of Violence (with John Wagner, Paradox Press, 1997)
- The Books of Faerie: Auberon's Tale (inks and finished art, Vertigo, 1998)
- Tales From the Black Museum:
  - "Feeders and Eaters" (with John Smith, in Judge Dredd Megazine #250, October 2006)
  - "The Incredible Teatime Torture Show" (with Tony Lee, in Judge Dredd Megazine #284, May 2009)
- Judge Dredd:
  - "The Sexmek Slasher" (with John Wagner, in 2000 AD #1521, January 2007)
  - "Birthday Boy" (with Pat Mills, in 2000 AD #1613-1616, November–December 2008)
- Tharg's Future Shocks: "Yggdrassil" (with Arthur Wyatt, in 2000 AD #1561, 2007)
- Tharg's 3rillers: "Colony" (with Kek-W, in 2000 AD #1880–1882, 2014)

=== Role-playing games ===
White Wolf Publishing: numerous credits

Wizards of the Coast (as interior artist):

- Pool of Radiance: Attack on Myth Drannor (Forgotten Realms) (2000)
- Living Greyhawk Gazetteer (2000)
- Wheel of Time Roleplaying Game (2001)
- Faiths and Pantheons (Forgotten Realms) (2002)
- City of the Spider Queen (Forgotten Realms) (2002)
- Underdark (Forgotten Realms) (2003)
- Unapproachable East (Forgotten Realms) (2003)
- Races of Faerûn (Forgotten Realms) (2003)
- Shining South (Forgotten Realms) (2004)
- Lost Empires of Faerûn (Forgotten Realms) (2005)

=== Music ===
With Cannibal Corpse

- Eaten Back to Life (1990) (Cover art)
- Butchered at Birth (1991) (Cover art)
- Tomb of the Mutilated (1992) (Cover art)
- The Bleeding (1994) (Cover art)
- Vile (1996) (Cover art)
- Gallery of Suicide (1998) (Cover art)
- Bloodthirst (1999) (Cover art)
- Live Cannibalism (2000) (Live album) (Artwork)
- Live Cannibalism (2000) (Live DVD) (Artwork)
- Gore Obsessed (2002) (Cover art)
- Classic Cannibal Corpse (2002) (Box set) (Cover art)
- Worm Infested (EP) (2003) (Cover art)
- The Wretched Spawn (2004) (Cover art)
- Kill (2006) (Artwork)
- Centuries of Torment: The First 20 Years (2008) (DVD) (Artwork) (Cover art)
- Evisceration Plague (2009) (Cover art)
- Global Evisceration (2011) (Live DVD) (Artwork)
- Torture (2012) (Cover art, as "Vince Locke")
- Dead Human Collection: 25 Years of Death Metal (2013) (Box set) (Cover art) (Logo) (Artwork)
- A Skeletal Domain (2014) (Cover art)
- Red Before Black (2017) (Cover art)
- Violence Unimagined (2021) (Cover art)
- Chaos Horrific (2023) (Cover art)
