= Gore Obsessed =

Studio album by Cannibal Corpse
- Released: February 26, 2002
- Studios: Sonic Ranch, Tornillo, TX, US
- Genre: Death metal
- Length: 38:15
- Label: Metal Blade
- Producers: Neil Kernon; Cannibal Corpse

Cannibal Corpse chronology
Live Cannibalism (2000)	Gore Obsessed (2002)	The Wretched Spawn (2004)

Censored cover

Professional ratings
Review scores
Source	Rating
AllMusic	4/5 stars
Collector's Guide to Heavy Metal	5/10

Gore Obsessed is the eighth studio album by American death metal band Cannibal Corpse, released on February 26, 2002 by Metal Blade Records.

The album's tempos "alternate from rat-tat-tat machine gun-style onslaughts to chugging mid-tempo mosh sections," according to AllMusic. The album features a cover of "No Remorse" by Metallica.

The Japanese version of the album includes "Compelled to Lacerate" as a live bonus track.

== Critical reception ==
Andy Hines of AllMusic gave the album four stars out of five, saying: "This is great stuff."

== Track listing ==
No.	Title	Lyrics	Music	Length
1.	"Savage Butchery"	Alex Webster	Webster; Jack Owen	1:50
2.	"Hatchet to the Head"	Paul Mazurkiewicz	Pat O'Brien	3:34
3.	"Pit of Zombies"	Webster	Webster	3:58
4.	"Dormant Bodies Bursting"	Mazurkiewicz	Owen	2:00
5.	"Compelled to Lacerate"	Webster	Webster	3:29
6.	"Drowning in Viscera"	Mazurkiewicz	O'Brien	3:36
7.	"Hung and Bled"	Webster	Webster	4:13
8.	"Sanded Faceless"	Mazurkiewicz	O'Brien	3:51
9.	"Mutation of the Cadaver"	Webster	Webster	3:09
10.	"When Death Replaces Life"	Owen; Mazurkiewicz	Owen	4:59
11.	"Grotesque"	Webster	Webster	3:42
Total length:				38:15

Limited edition bonus track
No.	Title	Writer(s)	Length
12.	"No Remorse" (Metallica cover)	Hetfield; Ulrich	6:16

== Personnel ==
Writing, performance and production credits are adapted from the album liner notes.

=== Personnel ===
Cannibal Corpse

- George "Corpsegrinder" Fisher – vocals
- Jack Owen – guitar
- Pat O'Brien – guitar
- Alex Webster – bass
- Paul Mazurkiewicz – drums

Production

- Neil Kernon – production, mixing
- Cannibal Corpse – production
- Justin Leeah – engineering
- Ramon Breton – mastering

Artwork and design

- Vincent Locke – cover art
- Alex McKnight – photography

=== Studios ===
- Sonic Ranch, Tornillo, TX, US – recording
- Oceanview Digital Mastering – mastering

== Charts ==
Chart	Peak position
German Albums (Offizielle Top 100)	71
US Independent Albums (Billboard)	11
US Heatseekers Albums (Billboard)	28
