= Bloodthirst (album) =

Studio album by Cannibal Corpse
- Released: October 19, 1999
- Studios: Village Productions, Tornillo, TX, US
- Genre: Death metal
- Length: 34:35
- Label: Metal Blade
- Producer: Colin Richardson

Cannibal Corpse chronology
| Gallery of Suicide (1998) | Bloodthirst (1999) | Live Cannibalism (2000) |

Censored cover

Bloodthirst is the seventh studio album by American death metal band Cannibal Corpse. It was released on October 19, 1999, through Metal Blade Records.

== Background ==
Bloodthirst was the band's first album to be recorded outside of Morrisound Recordings in Tampa, Florida, instead being recorded at Village Productions in Tornillo, Texas.

== Music and lyrics ==
The sound on Bloodthirst is similar to most previous releases by the band, employing "the prerequisite detuned grinding guitars [and] hyperspeed blastbeat drumming," according to Steve Huey of AllMusic. Huey stated that George Fisher sounds like his larynx is going through a garbage disposal unit on the album. The album employs some slower sections, such as on the third track "Unleashing the Bloodthirsty". The album's lyrics are centered on graphic violence and shock value topics, exploring themes such as decapitation and cannibalism.

== Reception ==
Steve Huey of Allmusic gave the album an underwhelming review, saying that while the band has tightened their songwriting, "the appeal of Bloodthirst likely rests on the listener's answer to the question "how much Cannibal Corpse do you really need?"

Professional ratings
Review scores
| Source | Rating |
|---|---|
| AllMusic | 2/5 stars |
| Collector's Guide to Heavy Metal | 8/10 |

== Track listing ==
| No. | Title | Lyrics | Music | Length |
|---|---|---|---|---|
| 1. | "Pounded into Dust" | Alex Webster | Webster | 2:17 |
| 2. | "Dead Human Collection" | Paul Mazurkiewicz | Pat O'Brien | 2:30 |
| 3. | "Unleashing the Bloodthirsty" | Webster | Webster | 3:50 |
| 4. | "The Spine Splitter" | Mazurkiewicz | Jack Owen | 3:10 |
| 5. | "Ecstacy in Decay" | Mazurkiewicz | O'Brien | 3:12 |
| 6. | "Raped by the Beast" | Mazurkiewicz | Owen | 2:34 |
| 7. | "Coffinfeeder" | Webster | Webster | 3:04 |
| 8. | "Hacksaw Decapitation" | Mazurkiewicz | O'Brien | 4:12 |
| 9. | "Blowtorch Slaughter" | Mazurkiewicz | Webster | 2:33 |
| 10. | "Sickening Metamorphosis" | Webster | Webster | 3:24 |
| 11. | "Condemned to Agony" | Webster | Webster | 3:44 |
| Total length: | | | | 34:35 |

== Credits ==
Writing, performance and production credits are adapted from the album liner notes.

=== Personnel ===
Cannibal Corpse

- George "Corpsegrinder" Fisher – vocals
- Pat O'Brien – lead guitar
- Jack Owen – rhythm guitar
- Alex Webster – bass
- Paul Mazurkiewicz – drums

Production

- Colin Richardson – production
- Justin Leeah – engineering
- Bobby Torres – studio assistant
- Eddy Schreyer – mastering

Artwork and design

- Vincent Locke – artwork
- Brian J. Ames – graphic design
- Alex McKnight – photography

=== Studios ===
- Village Productions, Tornillo, TX, US – production
- Oasis Mastering – mastering

== Charts ==
Chart performance for Bloodthirst
| Chart (1999) | Peak position |
|---|---|
| US Heatseekers Albums (Billboard) | 32 |
