= Live Cannibalism =

Live album & video by Cannibal Corpse
- Released: September 19, 2000
- Recorded: February 16, 2000 at The Rave in Milwaukee, Wisconsin, February 15, 2000 Indianapolis, Indiana
- Genre: Death metal
- Length: 65:53
- Label: Metal Blade

Cannibal Corpse chronology
Bloodthirst (1999)	Live Cannibalism (2000)	Gore Obsessed (2002)

Censored cover

Professional ratings
Review scores
Source	Rating
AllMusic	2/5 stars

Live Cannibalism is the first live album by American death metal band Cannibal Corpse, released in 2000 through Metal Blade Records. It was also released as a DVD.

== Critical reception ==
Steve Huey of AllMusic gave it two stars out of five, and wrote: "There isn't quite as much emphasis on later material as one might expect. There's nothing revelatory or unexpected here -- just a decent concert document for fans who either want to preserve the experience of the band's performances, or who can't make it to one."

== Track listing ==
No.	Title	Music	Length
1.	"Staring Through the Eyes of the Dead"	Chris Barnes, Jack Owen, Alex Webster	4:13
2.	"Blowtorch Slaughter"	Webster, Paul Mazurkiewicz	2:37
3.	"Stripped, Raped and Strangled"	Barnes, Rob Barrett, Owen, Webster	3:38
4.	"I Cum Blood"	Barnes, Owen, Bob Rusay, Webster, Mazurkiewicz	4:12
5.	"Covered with Sores"	Barnes, Owen, Rusay, Webster, Mazurkiewicz	3:43
6.	"Fucked with a Knife"	Barnes, Webster	2:26
7.	"Unleashing the Bloodthirsty"	Webster	4:12
8.	"Dead Human Collection"	Pat O'Brien, Mazurkiewicz	2:39
9.	"Gallery of Suicide"	Webster, Mazurkiewicz	4:11
10.	"Meat Hook Sodomy"	Barnes, Owen, Rusay, Webster, Mazurkiewicz	5:10
11.	"Perverse Suffering"	Owen, Mazurkiewicz	4:20
12.	"The Spine Splitter"	Owen, Mazurkiewicz	3:31
13.	"Gutted"	Barnes, Owen, Rusay, Webster, Mazurkiewicz	3:26
14.	"I Will Kill You"	Webster	2:47
15.	"Devoured By Vermin"	Barrett, Webster	3:38
16.	"Disposal of the Body"	George "Corpsegrinder" Fisher, Webster	3:41
17.	"A Skull Full of Maggots"	Barnes, Owen, Rusay, Webster, Mazurkiewicz	2:32
18.	"Hammer Smashed Face"	Barnes, Owen, Rusay, Webster, Mazurkiewicz	4:45
19.	"Sacrifice" (Sacrifice cover)	Rob Urbinati, Joe Rico, Scott Watts	3:03
20.	"Confessions" (Possessed cover)	Jeff Becerra, Mike Torrao	2:56

== Album notes ==
- Most of the album was recorded live at The Rave in Milwaukee on February 16, 2000. Tracks 3, 5, 6, 12 and 15 were recorded the day prior at The Emerson Theater in Indianapolis.

== Personnel ==
- George "Corpsegrinder" Fisher – vocals
- Pat O'Brien – lead guitar
- Jack Owen – rhythm guitar
- Alex Webster – bass
- Paul Mazurkiewicz – drums
