= Gallery of Suicide =

Studio album by Cannibal Corpse
- Released: April 21, 1998
- Studios: Morrisound Recordings, Tampa, Florida
- Genre: Death metal
- Length: 44:13
- Label: Metal Blade
- Producer: Jim Morris

Cannibal Corpse chronology
Vile (1996)	Gallery of Suicide (1998)	Bloodthirst (1999)

Professional ratings
Review scores
Source	Rating
AllMusic	2.5/5 stars
Collector's Guide to Heavy Metal	7/10

Gallery of Suicide is the sixth studio album by American death metal band Cannibal Corpse, released on April 21, 1998, through Metal Blade Records.

It is the first Cannibal Corpse album to feature former Nevermore guitarist Pat O'Brien. It is also the band's last album to be recorded at Morrisound Recordings in Tampa, where the band had recorded since 1990's Eaten Back to Life.

== Background and recording ==
Pat O'Brien had the track "Stabbed in the Throat" written in its entirety by the time of his earliest sessions with the band. George Fisher recalled working with producer Jim Morris: "I talked with him about some of the lyrics and he was dying with laughter! One time, he was laughing while I was recording – so I said, 'Dude, did I mess up?' and he said, 'No, no – how are you doing this? What the fuck are you doing? These lyrics are out of control...' There's some fast shit on there!"

== Music and lyrics ==
Gallery of Suicide has been referred to as "an hour-long symphony of cruelty." The album's guitar work has been described as "incessant" and "buzzing". Bassist Alex Webster said the addition of Pat O'Brien on lead guitar brought "that shredding firepower that we'd never had before." George Fisher said: "Pat added technique to the band that we didn't have before. We're not super-technical, but we were definitely heading in that direction." Fisher also stated his belief that Gallery is one of the most experimental releases of the band's career, expressing that the album's blast beats reminded him of black metal. He said, "It wasn't on purpose – it just turned out that way." Webster assessed: "It's one of the darkest albums we ever did: there’s dark melodies, dark lyrics... I mean, all our albums are dark, with songs about murder and so on, but there's something extra-dark about that one!" "Sentenced to Burn" has been called one of the band's "catchiest" songs by Loudwire, making use of groove.

In addition to "Blood Drenched Execution," O'Brien co-wrote "From Skin to Liquid" with Webster. Thematically, the song's title implies the topic of decomposition of a cadaver. Webster said: "It was the first really, really slow song we ever did and it also had no lyrics. [...] I feel like "From Skin to Liquid" was one of the first songs that we did that kind of showed that we were able to be heavy without using our old bag of tricks necessarily all the time. We were heavy without being fast and without having gory lyrics or any lyrics. [...] It's got a really creepy vibe to it."

== Artwork ==
The album's cover artwork was done by Vince Locke. According to Metal Hammer, the album's cover artwork "depicts a grim dungeon in which a group of characters are hanging, shooting and disembowelling themselves." George Fisher explained: "People go in there and commit suicide, and if you're unfortunate enough to be curious to see what this gallery is about, or crazy enough, you can go inside." A censored version of the album cover was also created. Alex Webster described the censored cover as "really dark and eerie-looking."

== Reception ==
Stephen Thomas Erlewine of AllMusic called the album "monotonous" and "predictable" in an underwhelming review. Drummer Paul Mazurkiewicz believes the album is underrated. Former guitarist Pat O'Brien said, "Some albums, people are gonna like, and some albums people aren't going to like as much or they're not going to like. I remember when I first joined the band, when we did Gallery of Suicide, there were a lot of people who hated it, but now a lot of people seem to like it; it's kinda weird."

== Track listing ==
No.	Title	Lyrics	Music	Vocal patterns	Length
1.	"I Will Kill You"	Alex Webster	Webster	Webster	2:47
2.	"Disposal of the Body"	Webster	Webster	Webster; George Corpsegrinder Fisher	1:54
3.	"Sentenced to Burn"	Webster	Webster	Webster; Fisher	3:06
4.	"Blood Drenched Execution"	Paul Mazurkiewicz; Fisher	Webster; Pat O'Brien	Mazurkiewicz; Fisher	2:40
5.	"Gallery of Suicide"	Mazurkiewicz	Webster; Jack Owen	Mazurkiewicz; Fisher	3:55
6.	"Dismembered and Molested"	Webster	Webster; Owen	Fisher	1:53
7.	"From Skin to Liquid" (instrumental)		Webster; O'Brien		5:30
8.	"Unite the Dead"	Webster	Webster; Owen	Webster	3:05
9.	"Stabbed in the Throat"	Mazurkiewicz	O'Brien	Mazurkiewicz	3:26
10.	"Chambers of Blood"	Webster	Webster	Webster	4:11
11.	"Headless"	Mazurkiewicz	Webster	Mazurkiewicz; Fisher	2:22
12.	"Every Bone Broken"	Mazurkiewicz	Owen	Mazurkiewicz	3:18
13.	"Centuries of Torment"	Webster	Webster	Webster; Fisher	4:04
14.	"Crushing the Despised"	Webster	Webster; Owen	Webster; Fisher	1:56
15.	"Sacrifice" (Japanese bonus track)		Sacrifice		3:03
Total length:					44:13(INT) 47:16(JP)

== Personnel ==
Credits adapted from the album liner notes.

Cannibal Corpse

- George "Corpsegrinder" Fisher – vocals
- Pat O'Brien – lead guitar
- Jack Owen – rhythm guitar
- Alex Webster – bass
- Paul Mazurkiewicz – drums

Production

- Jim Morris – production, engineering, mixing, mastering

Artwork and design

- Vincent Locke – cover art
- Brian J. Ames – design
- Al Messerschmidt – photography
- Alison Mohammed – photography

Studios

- Morrisound Recordings, Tampa, Florida – production, engineering, mixing
- Audio JJ – mastering

== Charts ==
Chart performance for Gallery of Suicide
Chart (1998)	Peak position
US Heatseekers Albums (Billboard)	22
