= The Wretched Spawn =

Studio album by Cannibal Corpse
- Released: February 24, 2004
- Recorded: October–November 2003
- Studios: Sonic Ranch, El Paso, TX
- Genre: Death metal
- Length: 44:22
- Label: Metal Blade
- Producer: Neil Kernon

Cannibal Corpse chronology
Gore Obsessed (2002)	The Wretched Spawn (2004)	Kill (2006)

Censored cover

Professional ratings
Review scores
Source	Rating
AllMusic	2.5/5 stars
Collector's Guide to Heavy Metal	7/10
Metal Storm	8.5/10
Scream Magazine	5/6 stars

The Wretched Spawn is the ninth studio album by American death metal band Cannibal Corpse. It was released on February 24, 2004 by Metal Blade Records. The cover art is by Vincent Locke. This is the last studio album to feature guitarist Jack Owen, one of the band's founding members, and up to the 2012 album Torture, the last with an album cover depicting violence and gore. The album was distributed with a making-of DVD produced by Nick Sahakian. The Wretched Spawn is Cannibal Corpse's fourth album to be named after one of the tracks on the album, after Butchered at Birth, The Bleeding and Gallery of Suicide.

== Music and lyrics ==
"For songs like "Nothing Left to Mutilate", and "Decency Defied", I looked to friends for ideas they had. "Decency [Defied]" was based on a friend who had a nightmare that her tattoos were being torn off while she was still alive. "Nothing Left to Mutilate" was based on ideas from a friend who was studying pheromones in college, and told me all about how a woman's scent drives men crazy. So if my imagination doesn't kick in, I draw from other things. "Slain" was based on the Eastwood film High Plains Drifter. And "Festering in the Crypt" is my own idea of dealing with the finality of death."- Jack Owen

Other themes explored on the album include decapitation and stoning.

With a song count of 13 and a total runtime of 44 minutes and 22 seconds, The Wretched Spawn is the longest Cannibal Corpse album, surpassing Gallery of Suicide (1998) by just ten seconds.

== Track listing ==
No.	Title	Lyrics	Music	Length
1.	"Severed Head Stoning"	Webster	O'Brien; Webster	1:45
2.	"Psychotic Precision"	Mazurkiewicz	O'Brien	2:56
3.	"Decency Defied"	Owen	Owen	2:59
4.	"Frantic Disembowelment"	Mazurkiewicz	O'Brien	2:50
5.	"The Wretched Spawn"	Webster	Webster	4:09
6.	"Cyanide Assassin"	Webster	Webster	3:11
7.	"Festering in the Crypt"	Owen	Owen	4:38
8.	"Nothing Left to Mutilate"	Owen	Owen	3:49
9.	"Blunt Force Castration"	Mazurkiewicz	O'Brien	3:27
10.	"Rotted Body Landslide"	Webster	Webster	3:24
11.	"Slain"	Owen	Owen	3:32
12.	"Bent Backwards and Broken"	Webster	Webster	2:58
13.	"They Deserve to Die"	Webster	Webster	4:44
Total length:				44:22

Bonus DVD
No.	Title	Length
1.	"The Making of The Wretched Spawn"	58:40

== Credits ==
Cannibal Corpse

- George "Corpsegrinder" Fisher – vocals
- Pat O'Brien – lead guitar
- Jack Owen – rhythm guitar
- Alex Webster – bass
- Paul Mazurkiewicz – drums

== Charts ==
Chart	Peak position
French Albums (SNEP)	136
German Albums (Offizielle Top 100)	74
US Independent Albums (Billboard)	20
US Heatseekers Albums (Billboard)	27
