= Cannibal Corpse =

American death metal band

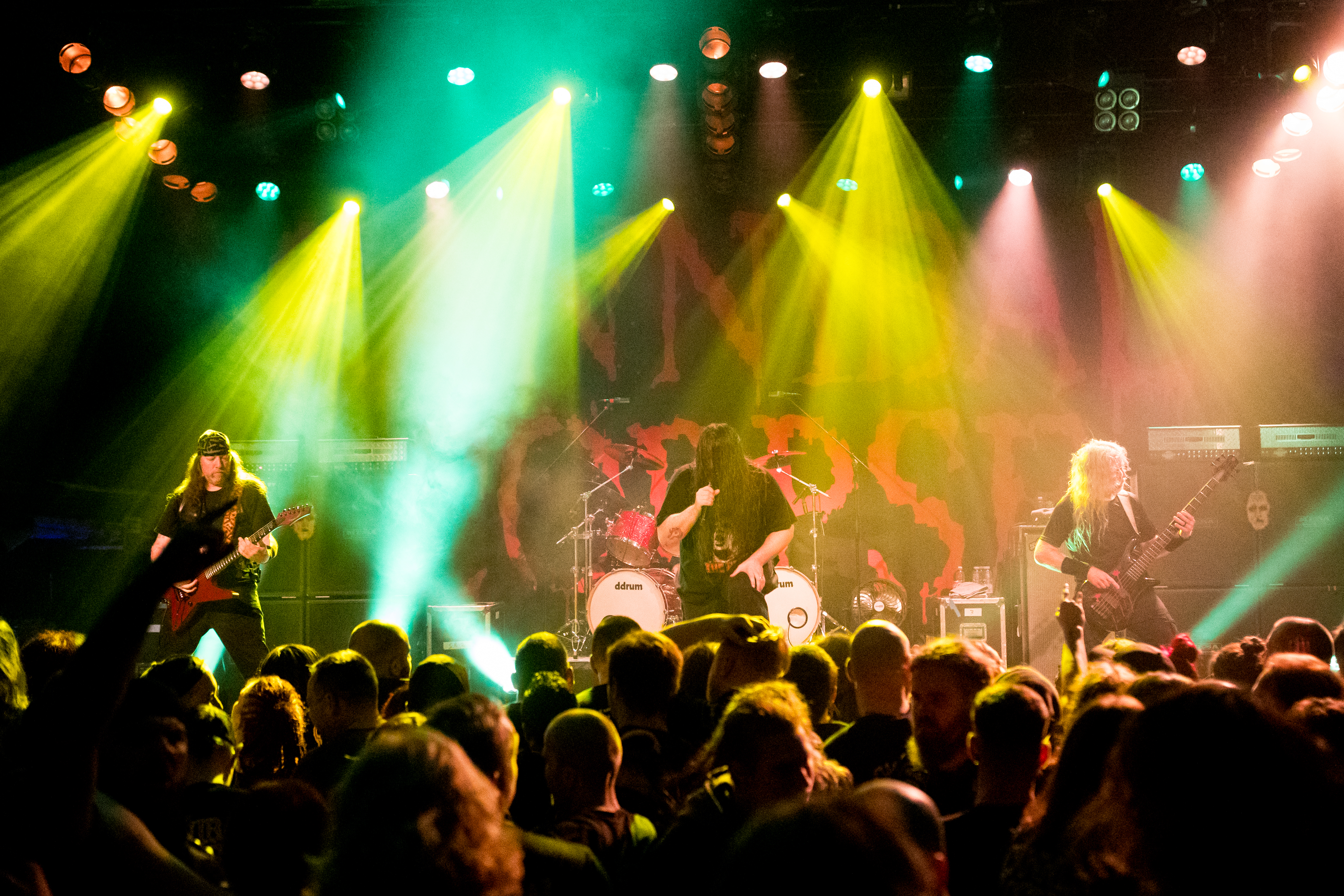
- Cannibal Corpse performing at Heidelberg, Baden-Württemberg, Germany in October 2024

Background information
- Origin: Buffalo, New York, U.S.
- Genre: Death metal
- Works: Discography
- Years active: 1988–present
- Label: Metal Blade
- Spinoffs: Six Feet Under; Voodoo Gods; Paths of Possession; Serpentine Dominion; Blotted Science; Conquering Dystopia
- Members: Paul Mazurkiewicz; Alex Webster; Rob Barrett; George Fisher; Erik Rutan
- Past members: Chris Barnes; Jack Owen; Bob Rusay; Pat O'Brien
- Website: cannibalcorpse.net

Cannibal Corpse is an American death metal band formed in Buffalo, New York, in 1988, now based in Tampa, Florida. They have been on Metal Blade Records for the entirety of their studio recording career. The band has released sixteen studio albums, two box sets, four video albums, and two live albums. The band has had little radio or television exposure throughout its existence, although a cult following began to build with the releases of their early albums, including Butchered at Birth (1991) and Tomb of the Mutilated (1992). As of 2015, they achieved worldwide sales of two million units for combined sales of all their albums.

The band initially performed a primitive form of thrash-influenced death metal on its demo and debut album Eaten Back to Life before evolving to an explicit death metal style on its sophomore effort Butchered at Birth. Typical of the death metal genre, Cannibal Corpse has consistently employed a lyrical focus on death, and especially graphic violence themes inspired by horror films throughout its career. As their career progressed, Cannibal Corpse also placed greater emphasis on hooks and technically proficient instrumentation in comparison to the raw and unstructured nature of their early recordings. While the band has deliberately maintained a consistent sound throughout its career to avoid alienating fans and the respective community, its members have been involved with various side projects within various other styles of metal.

Cannibal Corpse has seen several lineup changes throughout its run, with drummer Paul Mazurkiewicz and bassist Alex Webster being the only constant members. The band's current lineup includes Mazurkiewicz, Webster, vocalist George "Corpsegrinder" Fisher, and guitarists Rob Barrett and Erik Rutan. Cannibal Corpse has been credited as being among the most prominent and influential death metal bands of all time by most publications. The band's music is highly controversial, and the extreme nature of the band's lyrics and album covers has resulted in bans in several countries.

== History ==
=== Formation and self-titled demo (1988–1989) ===
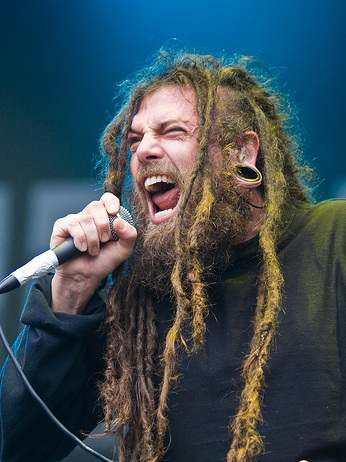
Original vocalist Chris Barnes was in the band from its formation until his dismissal in 1995. Barnes appeared on the band's first four studio albums.

Cannibal Corpse was formed in December 1988 when members from recently disbanded Buffalo-area death metal bands Beyond Death (Alex Webster and Jack Owen) and Tirant Sin (Paul Mazurkiewicz, Chris Barnes, Bob Rusay) started jamming and writing music together. Mazurkiewicz, Barnes and Rusay knew each other from high school, and met Webster and Owen while attending area shows. Webster recalled, "when we got going, there were only a few other bands that you’d really call death metal".

Bassist Alex Webster came up with the name Cannibal Corpse. The band played its first show at Buffalo's River Rock Cafe in March 1989, shortly after recording a five-song self-titled demo tape, which is now commonly known as A Skull Full of Maggots. The band's first live performance was opening for thrash metal band Dark Angel at a sold-out show in a small club. The band promoted the show by printing off thousands of posters in multiple colors, and handing them out at a Metallica concert. Afterward, the band gained traction in the Buffalo area, going as far to receive mentions by The Buffalo News. During this time, the band also opened for Bloodfeast, The Accüsed, Death and Kreator. Cannibal Corpse would also often play shows with Malevolent Creation, as the latter were local to Buffalo as well. The band signed to Metal Blade Records in July 1989. Mike Faley at Metal Blade wanted to sign the band immediately after reading the song titles in their tracklist. He heard the demo tape after having had it sent to him by the manager of the record store in which Barnes was working. Metal Blade president Brian Slagel recalled: "I thought it was really interesting and cool. Plus, 'A Skull Full of Maggots' is one of the greatest song titles ever." Mazurkiewicz called it "a dream come true" that they signed with Metal Blade after eight months of being a band.

=== Eaten Back to Life and Butchered at Birth (1990–1991) ===
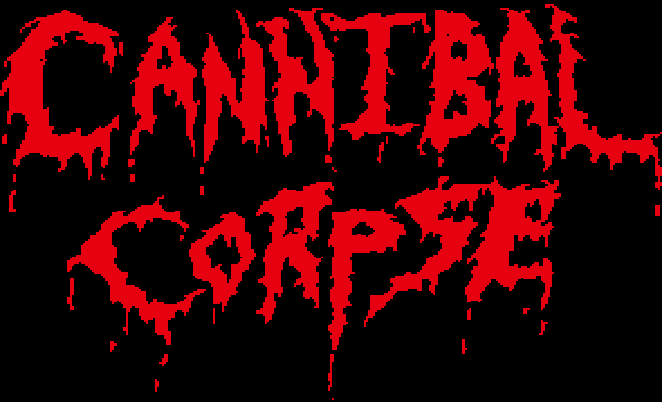
The band's original logo, which was created by original vocalist Chris Barnes. The logo was changed after Barnes' departure in 1995 to avoid litigation regarding royalties.

The band's debut album, Eaten Back to Life, was released in August 1990. The band played several local area shows to support the album. Inspired by and seeking the new commercial and recording opportunities of the then-emerging Florida death metal scene, the band relocated to Tampa. The band released its second album Butchered at Birth on July 1, 1991. Webster recalled being surprised by the crowd turnout and reaction while touring Europe in 1991 for Butchered at Birth. The band members quit their day jobs and dropped out of college during this time.

Friction arose between the band members while touring in support of Butchered at Birth. According to Webster, Barnes was managing a tour by himself for the first time, and there were uncertainties regarding how the tour's finances were being handled. The band privately dissolved and split into two separate camps during this time, and Owen claims to have been in the middle of the situation. Mazurkiewicz and Webster moved into an apartment just four doors down from the band's practice space, and composed the music to "Hammer Smashed Face" as a means to vent their frustrations with Barnes.

Cannibal Corpse soon reformed and toured Europe with Atheist and Gorguts in early 1992. That same year, the band toured with Obituary, Malevolent Creation and Agnostic Front on the Complete Control Tour. Cannibal Corpse and Malevolent Creation shared a tour bus during this tour, and the latter of which future Cannibal Corpse guitarist Rob Barrett was playing with. Barrett said: "We were like one big family, and I am pretty sure that is why I got the call to join with them the next year."

=== Tomb of the Mutilated and dismissal of Bob Rusay (1992–1993) ===
So, we get into the studio and they all say, "We want Jack to do both guitars on the album." I was like, "Fuck that! This is a band." When they had Jack do both guitar parts, the whole thing broke. It was the final straw. People need to know I wasn't able to record my own fuckin' music. Shit I wrote. They did the same thing on the Hammer Smashed Face EP. After about two weeks I got the call that I was fired. I don't think Chris had too much to say about it. It took me by surprise. I was working a club, Chris showed up, punched me in the arm, and then the next day I get a call, "We don't wanna jam with you anymore." It's like, "What? Do I have a choice here?" The way it was handled was pretty bad. I called Paul and he was frantic. Like a little girl. That's how they got rid of me. I tell people it was a mutual break-up and we weren't getting along, but now that we're talking about it I want to set the record straight.

— Original Cannibal Corpse guitarist Bob Rusay recounting his dismissal from the band in the book Precious Metal, as quoted by Chris Dick of Decibel (2008)

The band released their third album Tomb of the Mutilated on September 22, 1992, which was said to have showcased "some of the sickest album art and song titles of all time." Vincent Jeffries of AllMusic said: "the band's attention-getting tactics worked perfectly and record sales soared. Cannibal Corpse then became one of the biggest names in the death metal genre -- just as the group's discs and live performances were being banned all over the world."

In February 1993, founding guitarist Bob Rusay was fired from the group and was replaced by Malevolent Creation guitarist Rob Barrett, which the band emphasized as "definitely a professional decision and nothing personal."

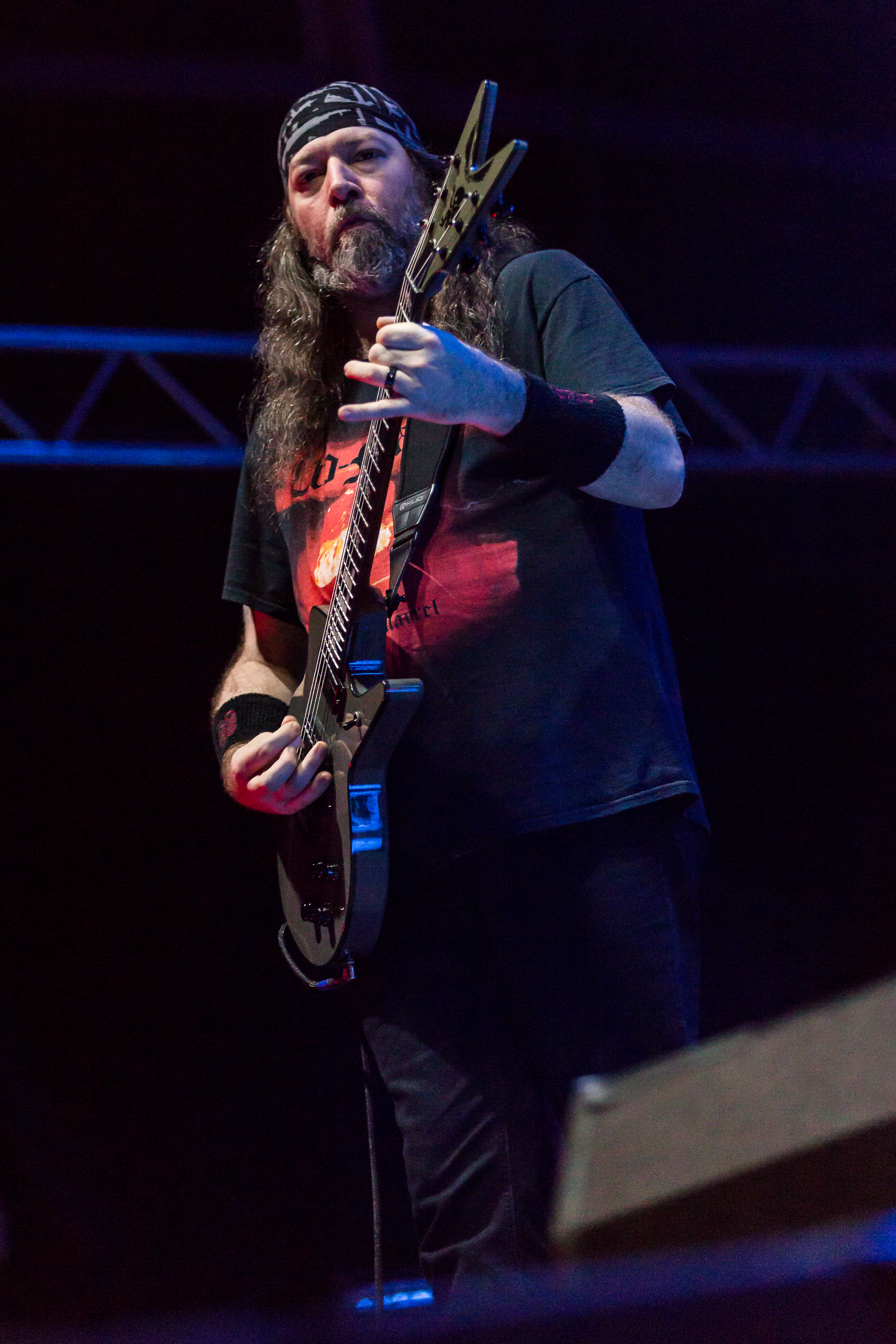
Guitarist Rob Barrett performing with Cannibal Corpse at Full Force in 2019. Barrett replaced original guitarist Bob Rusay in 1993. Barrett left the band in 1997 and was replaced by Pat O'Brien. Barrett returned to the band in 2005 to replace the band's other original guitarist Jack Owen.

The band has since stated that Rusay, whose musical background was in punk rock, was struggling to adapt to the band's increasingly technical musical approach. Owen recalled: "We tried to be professional. We were under the microscope. The budgets were getting bigger. He wasn't tight. It's not where we were at. It goes back to Butchered." Owen stated that he had outright refused to take it upon himself to deliver the news to Rusay out of fear for his own safety. According to Webster: "Bob was the tough guy in the band, for sure. He was in great physical condition and was really into martial arts. When you're young, you tend to solve your problems that way instead of talking it out. That was something to think about. He could have found us if he wanted."

The task of firing Rusay was ultimately assumed by Webster. Rusay was attending a party in celebration of the Buffalo Bills winning the Conference Championship Game when Webster phoned him to notify him of his dismissal. Webster was not a sports fan, and was unaware he had timed the actioning of the band's decision poorly. Webster recounted that Rusay hung up on him. Barnes has since stated that he and Owen did not agree with the decision to relieve Rusay of his duties, and expressed regret for having not called him afterward. However, by Webster's account, the decision to dismiss Rusay was unanimous.

The band has stated that Rusay was deeply hurt by his dismissal, and has made no effort to contact them since. Despite his dismissal from the band, Mazurkiewicz commended Rusay in the Centuries of Torment documentary, calling him "monumental". Barnes credited Rusay for having composed some of the most important songs of the band's early career. Rusay subsequently withdrew from the music scene wholesale, and has since become a golf instructor.

The band fired Rusay weeks before they were scheduled to leave for a US tour. Rusay's replacement, Rob Barrett, learned the entire setlist in two weeks prior to the tour. In an interview at Milwaukee Metalfest in 1993, Barrett said: "The kids in Europe were disappointed about [Rusay's departure], 'cause [they were like], 'What happened to Bob?! He was the brutal-est!' So I kind of had my work cut out for me, you know?"

=== Ace Ventura cameo and The Bleeding (1994) ===
Shortly following Rusay's dismissal, Cannibal Corpse had a cameo appearance in the 1994 Jim Carrey film Ace Ventura: Pet Detective, performing an abridged version of their song "Hammer Smashed Face".

The band released their fourth studio album The Bleeding on April 12, 1994. According to Paul Mazurkiewicz, “The Bleeding had begun a process of change in the band. We were developing musically, and the aim was to really take things to the next level. I believe this was obvious with the music that the four of us were coming up with at the time.”

After The Bleeding's touring cycle had concluded, Barrett convinced the rest of the band to relocate to Florida. Barnes stated in a 2025 interview that he was not given a say in this decision.

=== Dismissal of Chris Barnes and Vile (1995–1996) ===
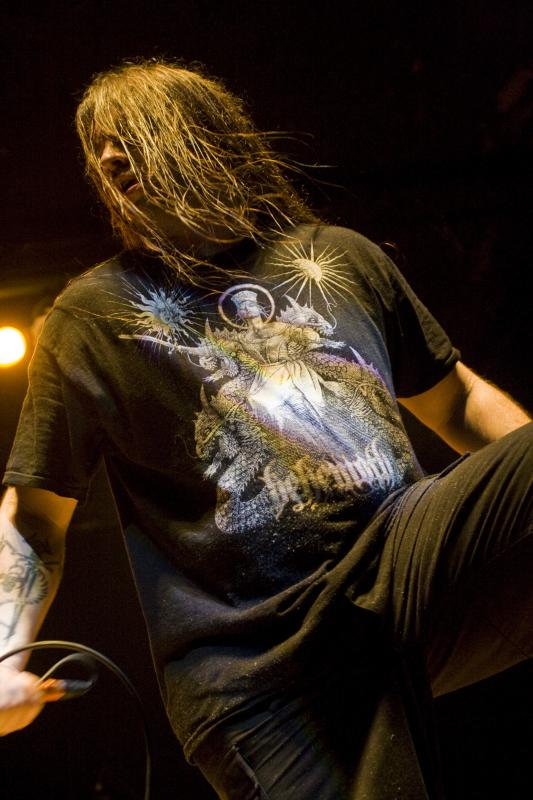
Former Monstrosity vocalist George Fisher replaced original vocalist Chris Barnes in 1995

In 1995, during recording sessions for their fifth album Vile, singer Chris Barnes was dismissed from the band while on tour with Six Feet Under, which was at the time his side project. Barnes and the rest of the band members have since stated the split was due to creative and personal differences within the group that had been mounting for years. The band members have since admitted some semblance of jealousy towards Barnes on their part, partially due to media attention regarding his vocals and lyrical content, which often eclipsed attention towards the band's instrumentation and songwriting. Barnes stated "things just kept getting weirder and weirder between us at that point," and has gone as far as to allude to a fist fight with another band member that occurred during this time. In 2025, Barnes admitted to probably being most at fault for the tension.

Barnes was replaced by Monstrosity singer George "Corpsegrinder" Fisher. According to Paul Mazurkiewicz, "George was the only person we ever considered", and Fisher not joining could have ended the band. Webster commented that people at Metal Blade made it sound like their careers were over without Barnes, and he thought "if the only good thing about our band was Chris Barnes, then we weren’t much of a band then, were we?" Mazurkiewicz said Slagel was very displeased, but the band had faith and the fans reacted positively.

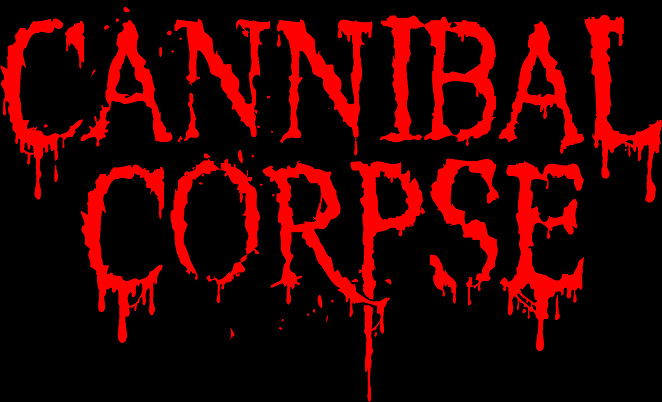
The band's current logo, in use since 1995.

Producer Scott Burns thought Barnes was irreplaceable, but recalled that the band knew Burns was not satisfied with Barnes's performance. Barret would occasionally bring up hiring Fisher and was easiest to get on board. According to Burns, the band said they "didn't care if Metal Blade dropped them. They wanted to make one record where they were as happy with the vocals as the music."

The band released their fifth album Vile in 1996. Mazurkiewicz recounted people being reluctant since they loved Barnes, but upon release, "for the most part, everybody shut up after that. As soon as we put the album out, we went out on the road, and it was 'Barnes who?' at that point."

The band toured North America with Misfits, Anthrax and Life of Agony in 1996.

Barnes went on to perform with the band Six Feet Under as his main project and later, Torture Killer. Barnes designed the original Cannibal Corpse logo, which was changed following his dismissal from the band. Mazurkiewicz clarified that while Barnes did draw the original logo, he had no legal ownership. After Barnes' firing, he started demanding royalties for CDs and merchandise which had the logo. This led to the band creating a new logo for Vile, which Mazurkiewicz found to also fit the new era for the band.

=== Gallery of Suicide, Bloodthirst and Gore Obsessed (1997–2003) ===
In February 1997, Rob Barrett left Cannibal Corpse due to musical differences and rejoined his previous bands Malevolent Creation, Solstice, and HatePlow. Pat O'Brien replaced Barrett on guitar. He had been recommended to the band by their soundperson, as well as by Steve Tucker, who had been playing with Morbid Angel at that time. Webster recalled not having to hurry to accommodate the change, as they had only written three songs by then. They continued writing and took a couple of months before hiring another guitarist. The band started recording new material in October 1997. Fisher shared a house with Mazurkiewicz and another friend during this time, where they frequently partied.

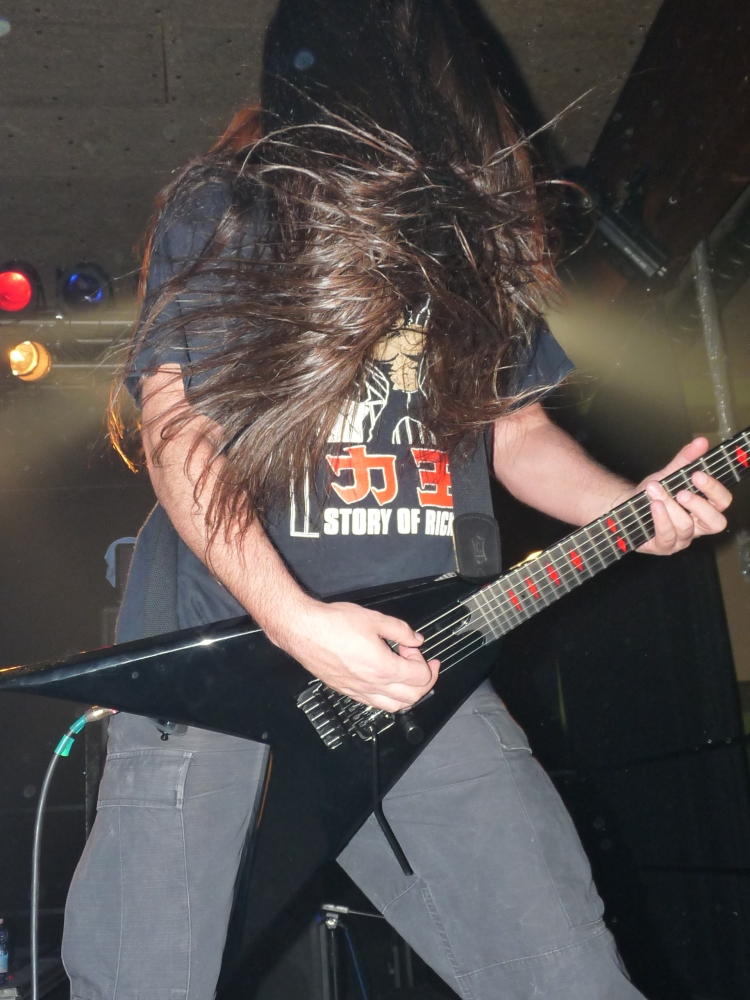
Pat O'Brien, formerly of Nevermore, replaced Rob Barrett on guitar following his departure from the band in 1997.

The band's sixth studio album, Gallery of Suicide, was released on April 21, 1998. It was O'Brien's first studio appearance with the band. The album proved popular with fans of black metal, and Cannibal Corpse would ultimately tour with Swedish bands Marduk and Dark Funeral during this time. Webster stated: "Black and death metal come from the exact same roots, from mid-80s stuff like Sodom, Kreator, Celtic Frost and Possessed, so there was no reason why they couldn’t tour together, and that worked out really well."

The band performed at Wacken Open Air in August 1999. The band's seventh studio album, Bloodthirst, was released on October 19, 1999. Steve Huey of AllMusic opined: "It's rather remarkable how little the band's sound has changed over the course of an entire decade."

The band's first live album, Live Cannibalism, was released on September 26, 2000.

The band's eighth studio album, Gore Obsessed, was released on February 26, 2002. They appeared at the Wacken Open Air music festival in August 2002.

The band toured the US during the winter of 2004 with Hypocrisy, Exhumed and Vile.

=== The Wretched Spawn, departure of Jack Owen and return of Rob Barrett (2004–2005) ===
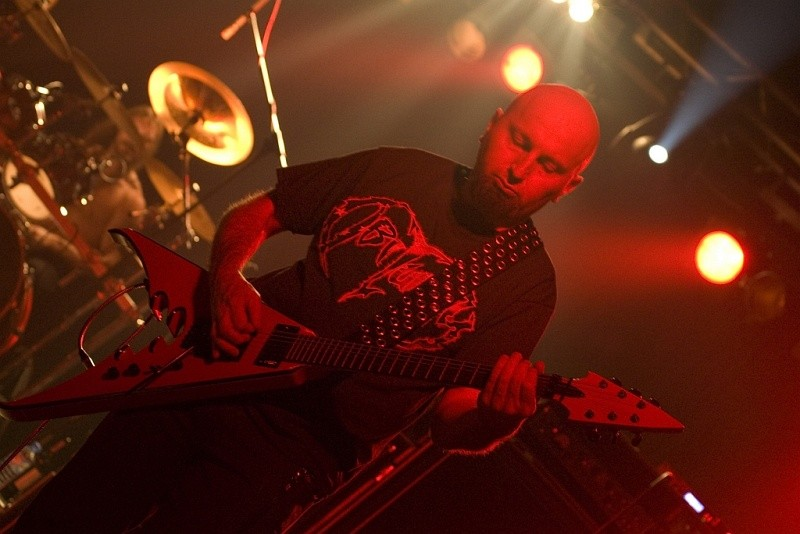
Original guitarist Jack Owen left the band in 2004, and was replaced by former guitarist Rob Barrett. Owen would go on to join Deicide and later Six Feet Under.

The band's ninth studio album The Wretched Spawn was released on February 24, 2004.

Founding guitarist Jack Owen left Cannibal Corpse in 2004 to spend more time on his second band, Adrift, and also joined Deicide in late 2004. Jeremy Turner of Origin substituted on guitar for the band's 2004 tour of Mexico in support of their album The Wretched Spawn, after being referred to the band by Erik Rutan of Hate Eternal (who would later join the band himself in 2019). The band also played Wacken Open Air and toured the US that year. Turner stated that he believes he played approximately 90 shows with the band over a six-month period. The band ultimately did not hire him as a permanent replacement for Owen due to his locality in Kansas; although Turner said that he would have been willing to relocate to join the band, the band in the long run did not feel comfortable uprooting him from his family and life. Rob Barrett re-joined the band for a concert at the Northwest Deathfest in Washington in 2005, before ultimately reassuming guitar duties permanently following several months of deliberation. Barrett's mother stated in the Centuries of Torment documentary that she discouraged his decision to leave the band in the first place.

=== Kill and Evisceration Plague (2006–2011) ===
The band's tenth studio album Kill was released on March 21, 2006, and was considered a turning point in the band's career.

The band participated in the Sounds of the Underground Tour in 2006, which also featured Behemoth and In Flames. The band also embarked on a headlining tour alongside Necrophagist and Dying Fetus in late 2006.

Cannibal Corpse played at Wacken Open Air in August 2007. Writing for the follow-up to Kill began in November 2007, as indicated in an interview with bassist Alex Webster. Evisceration Plague, Cannibal Corpse's eleventh studio album, was released on February 3, 2009, to a highly positive response from fans. They also released a live DVD in 2011 entitled Global Evisceration.

The band toured with Children of Bodom to promote the album. The band then participated in Mayhem Festival 2009 along with Marilyn Manson, Slayer, Behemoth, Job For a Cowboy and The Black Dahlia Murder. The band then toured on the Decimation Of The Nation 2 tour along with Hatebreed, Unearth, Born of Osiris and Hate Eternal. Throughout 2010, the band played various festivals in Europe such as Wacken Open Air, Full Force and Bloodstock Festival. Following these festival appearances, the band toured the US during the spring of 2010 with Norwegian black metal band 1349 and thrash metal band Skeletonwitch. The band toured the US during the fall of 2010 with Dying Fetus, Vital Remains, and Devourment.

=== Torture, A Skeletal Domain and Red Before Black (2012–2019) ===
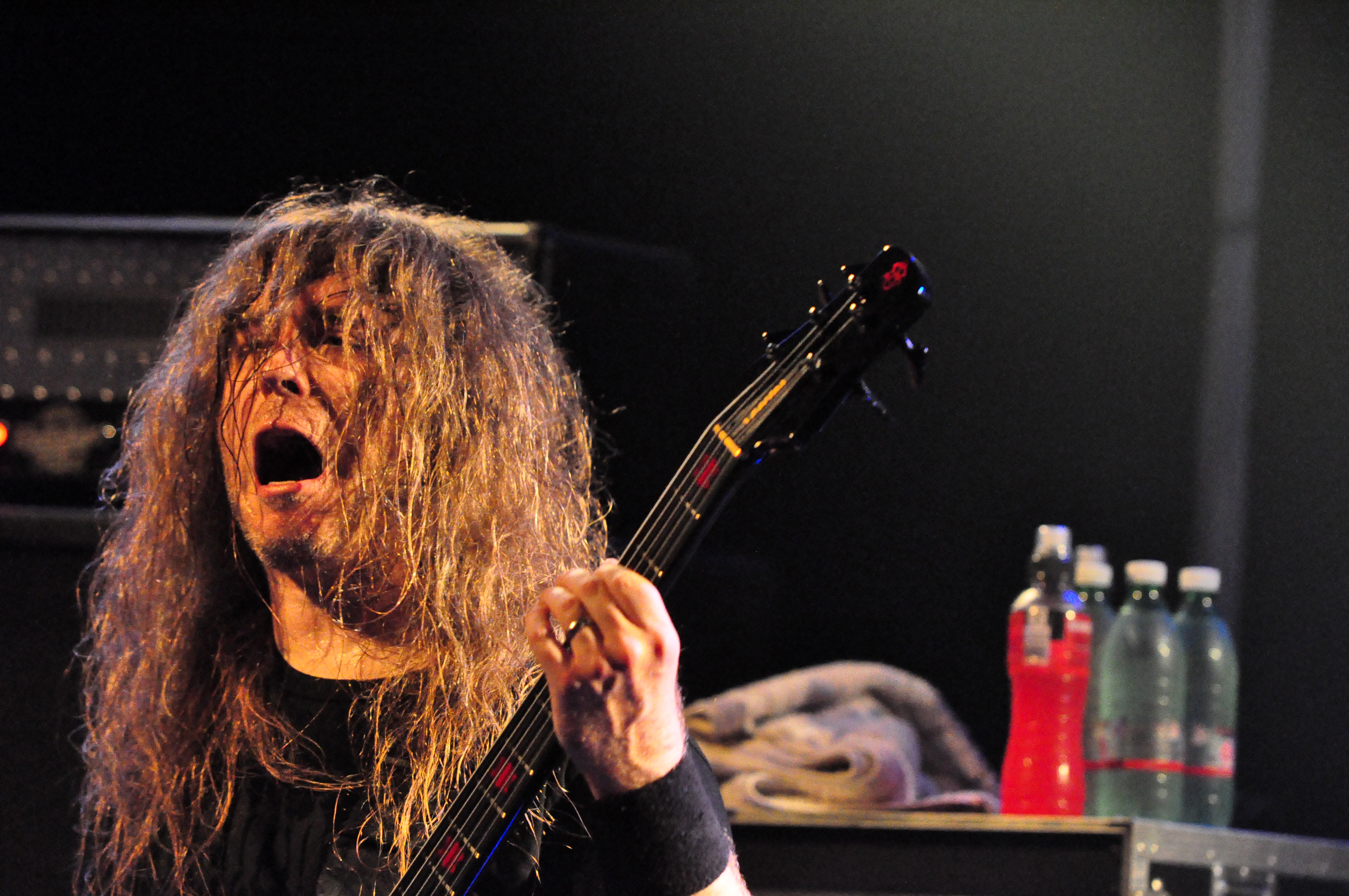
Bassist Alex Webster performing in Rostock in 2012

Cannibal Corpse released its twelfth studio album, Torture, in March 2012. Two early bands of the members reunited for one respective benefit concert each for Tony Lorenzo of the group Sons Of Azrael in January 2012. The band toured the US from late 2012 into early 2013 with Misery Index and Hour of Penance.

In February 2014, Cannibal Corpse announced that they had begun recording their thirteenth album, A Skeletal Domain, which was released on September 16. "Sadistic Embodiment" was released as a single in July. All the song titles of the forthcoming album were announced on the same day. The same month, Metal Blade announced the publication of the band's authorized biography Bible Of Butchery, written by the British author Joel McIver.

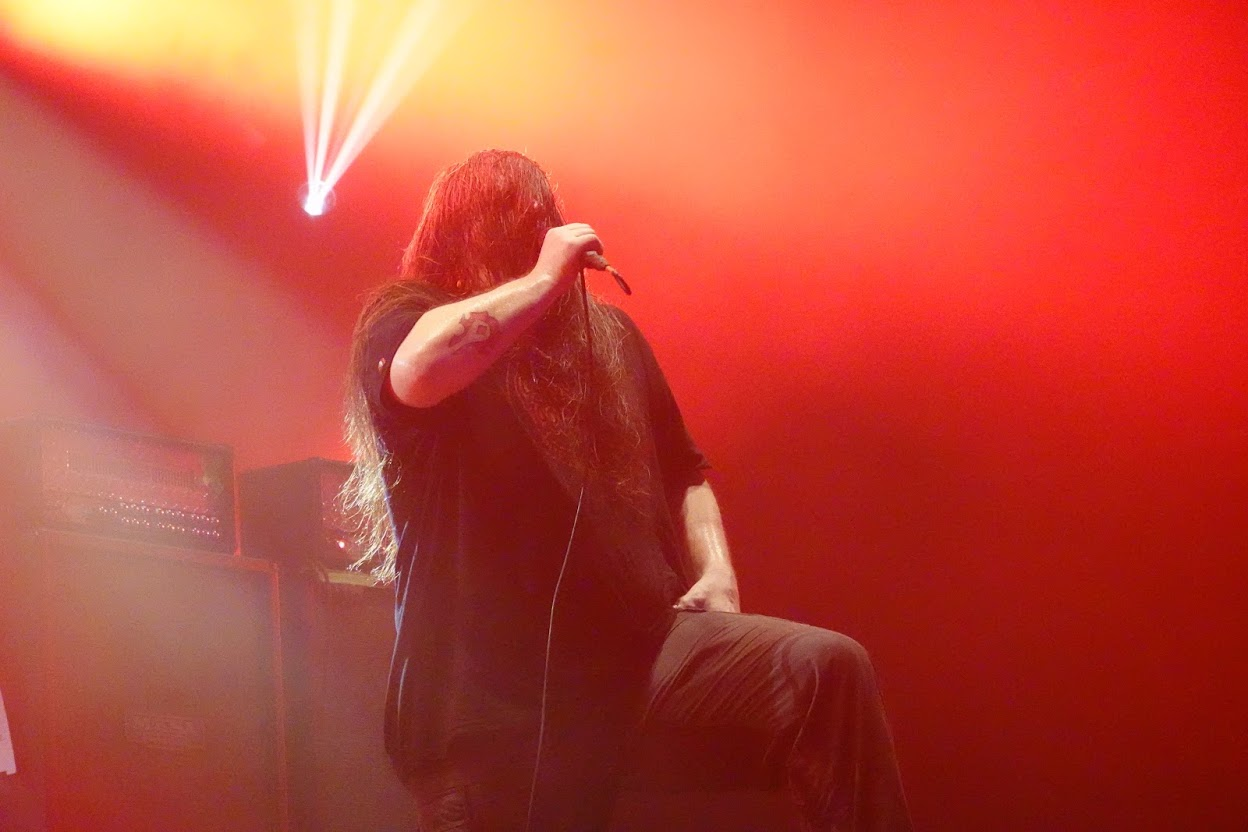
George Fisher performing at Hellfest in 2019

In an August 2016 interview, drummer Paul Mazurkiewicz stated that Cannibal Corpse would likely begin recording a new album in 2017. In September 2017, the band announced their fourteenth studio album Red Before Black, which was released on November 3.

On December 10, 2018, guitarist Pat O'Brien was arrested for assault and battery; his bail was set at $50,000. On the eve of the news of his arrest, Cannibal Corpse was announced as one of the supporting acts for Slayer's final North American tour, which would take place in the spring of 2019 and also be supported by Lamb of God and Amon Amarth. On January 18, 2019, Cannibal Corpse announced that Hate Eternal frontman and former Morbid Angel guitarist Erik Rutan would fill-in for O'Brien on their future tours. The band toured the US with Thy Art is Murder in the fall of 2019.

=== Violence Unimagined and Chaos Horrific (2020–2025) ===
Cannibal Corpse entered the studio in June 2020 to begin recording their fifteenth studio album. On February 1, 2021, the band announced that the album, Violence Unimagined, would be released on April 16. They released a music video for the song "Inhumane Harvest" from the album in February. The music video was largely inspired by the Saw movie franchise. The band also announced that live guitarist Erik Rutan has officially joined the band full-time. Cannibal Corpse received its best "first week" sales of all-time and first Top 10 on the Billboard Top Album Sales Chart with Violence Unimagined, which entered at No. 6 with 14,000 copies sold.

In early 2022, the band toured the US with Whitechapel and Revocation. In fall of 2022, the band toured the US with Dark Funeral, Immolation and Black Anvil.

By January 2023, Cannibal Corpse had begun working on their sixteenth studio album, which was listed by Revolver magazine as one of the "55 Most Anticipated Albums" of the year. The band toured Europe in the spring of 2023 with support from Ingested and Dark Funeral. On June 22, 2023, the band released a new single "Blood Blind" and announced their next record, Chaos Horrific, would be released on September 22, 2023.

In the fall of 2023, the band embarked on a co-headlining US tour with Mayhem, along with Gorguts and Blood Incantation. The band toured Europe in the fall of 2024 with Municipal Waste and Immolation. During this tour, Erik Rutan's house suffered catastrophic damage from Hurricane Helene, which forced him to leave the tour early. The band completed the tour with Barrett assuming all guitar duties.

The band toured the US with Meshuggah and Carcass during the spring of 2025. This included a performance at the Sonic Temple music festival in Columbus, Ohio in May 2025. In April, a couple made headlines after getting married during Cannibal Corpse's set on the Pittsburgh stop of this tour. Webster recalled the event later that year to the Los Angeles Times: he had met the party at a bar while eating with friends before the show. They told him about the plan, but he didn't understand because of the noise and thought it would be a marriage proposal. They learned of them getting married in the mosh pit the next day.

The band announced a headlining tour of the US for the fall of 2025 with support from Municipal Waste and Fulci. Full of Hell was later added to the tour. Rob Barrett did not participate in the tour, and was substituted by former The Black Dahlia Murder guitarist Brandon Ellis.

=== Upcoming seventeenth studio album (2026–present) ===
In March 2026, drummer Paul Mazurkiewicz confirmed that Cannibal Corpse is taking a break from live activities and will begin working on their seventeenth studio album soon.

== Artistry ==
=== Musical style and influences ===
Cannibal Corpse is a death metal band. Various publications have also classified the band as brutal death metal and old school death metal, with the band's earliest material also being described as thrash metal.

Founding guitarist Jack Owen self-described the band's first four albums: "Eaten is thrashy, Butchered is overwritten [...] Tomb is abrasive and violent, and then The Bleeding was like 'okay slow it down and concentrate." He also said: "You can hear everyone’s writing style in their own songs." Despite the increasing technical proficiency and polish on the band's studio releases throughout its career, the overall style has remained relatively unchanged according to Greg Prato of AllMusic. According to former guitarist Pat O'Brien: "There are certain areas where we're not going to be able to go where other bands have gone. But we don't want to; we're Cannibal Corpse and we're just gonna do what we do." In an interview with Invisible Oranges, Webster stated: "Unless you’re an experimental metal band by nature, people don’t really want that experimentation, I don’t think. They want us to try and out-do what we’ve done – I don’t think people want us to stand still and put out the same album again and again but I think what they want is something stylistically consistent and hopefully even a little better than the last album. When bands go too far away from their style it’s generally not well received in the metal community. Consistency is a big part of our genre." In an interview with Guitar World, he said his side projects allowed him to expand musically, but he didn't want to detract from Cannibal Corpse "being a big, heavy rhythm machine". Mazurkiewicz recalled hating when bands changed from a style he liked, and never wanting to be like that.

The members of the band were originally inspired by thrash metal bands such as Metallica, Slayer, Testament, Dark Angel, S.O.D., Sadus, Sodom, Kreator, D.R.I. and Sacrifice, and early death metal bands such as Deicide, Possessed, Autopsy, Napalm Death, Obituary, Morbid Angel and Death. Both former vocalist Chris Barnes and current vocalist George Fisher have cited late Death vocalist Chuck Schuldiner as a major influence in their development as vocalists. Jack Owen also stated that he was influenced by Bay Area thrash bands such as Exodus in the beginning, and also stated that the band was influenced by Napalm Death and Sepultura. Webster has stated that the band was fond of early black metal bands such as Venom and Bathory in its early days as well, and Owen cited Celtic Frost as an early influence. Drummer Paul Mazurkiewicz said: "Nothing inspired me other than what we were doing. We were narrow-minded in those days. If it wasn't death metal, we weren't listening to it." On Tomb of the Mutilated, the band began drawing more technical and progressive influences from Florida death metal acts such as Atheist and Cynic. On the Hammer Smashed Face EP, the band paid tribute to English heavy metal band Black Sabbath, covering the song "Zero the Hero" from their 1983 album Born Again. In addition to Black Sabbath, the members of Cannibal Corpse have cited hard rock and metal bands such as AC/DC, Accept, Deep Purple, Iron Maiden, Judas Priest, Kiss, Mercyful Fate, Motörhead, Rush and Van Halen as their influences and inspirations.

=== Instrumentation and vocals ===
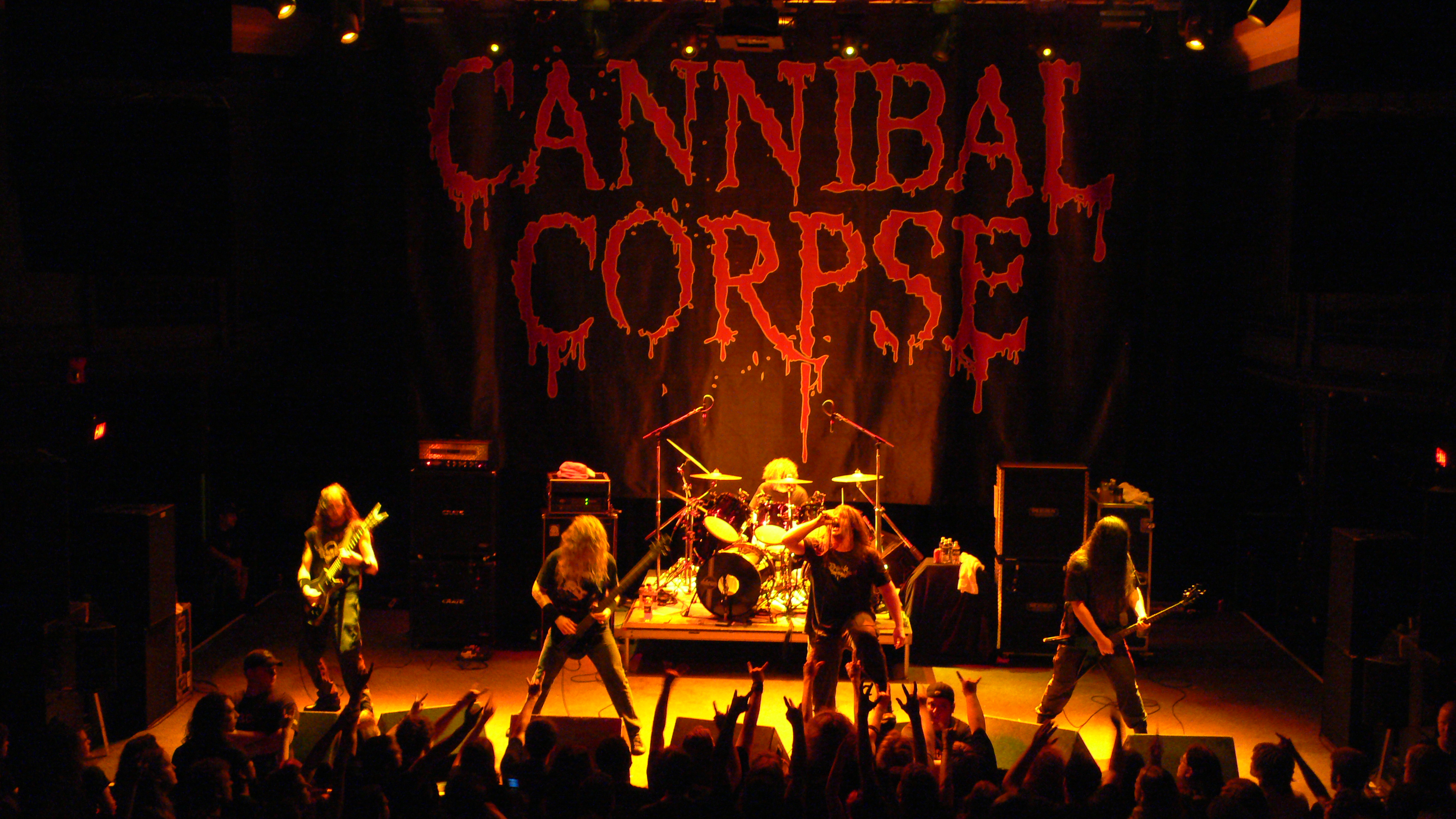
Performance in Washington, D.C. in 2007

Cannibal Corpse has been described as a "Wall of Sound", and its songwriting is described as "brutally aggressive but melodic." Guitarist Rob Barrett has stated "You can be melodic without having it sound happy or triumphant. We try to go for the more uglier sounding stuff." Many of the band's melodies make use of atonality. Guitarist Pat O'Brien said, "a lot of stuff that we have to put solos over is not in a particular key, or doesn't fit in a particular scale pattern. [...] It’s totally free, it's almost like jazz in a lot of ways, because you can get as crazy and as 'out there' as you want." He also stated the band uses scales that sound evil, such as the diminished and Hungarian minor scales. The band's early releases are recognized for their rawness, and have been described as being "live sounding." Bassist Alex Webster said: "I guess there’s little things I’d consider mistakes on [the early albums], but that captures something -- It gives them that live feel." A great deal of the band's early material was composed by original guitarist Bob Rusay, including tracks such as "Skull Full of Maggots," "Post-Mortal Ejaculaton," and "Beyond the Cemetery." His musical background was in punk rock, and his writing style was described by his bandmates as abrasive, unorthodox, and offbeat. The guitar tone on early Cannibal Corpse releases, such as Butchered at Birth, has been characterized as a "beehive-wall of white noise." The band's later releases are generally considered to be more rhythmically and melodically complex, which was partially the result of Alex Webster's desire to explore the "technical side of music," beginning with Tomb of the Mutilated. Loudwire described the band's general riffing style as "jagged". Exclaim! stated that the band's later releases take a "shreddier" approach to the guitar work.

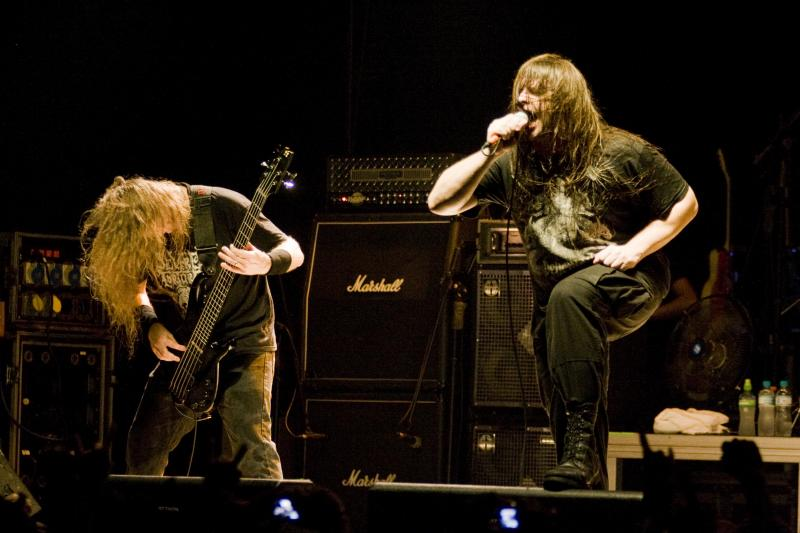
Alex Webster and George Fisher performing in São Paulo, Brazil

The band's early releases are described as "a progressively over-the-top approach to gore-themed death metal that pushed the envelope in every imaginable way, from cover art to song titles to the music itself." Early critics noted that the "grunting" death growls of original vocalist Chris Barnes were mostly unintelligible. The writing process for the band's early releases were largely collaborative efforts. However, by the time of the writing for Tomb of the Mutilated, the band members began composing more material on their own, and beginning with Vile, songwriting credits began being attributed to individual band members.

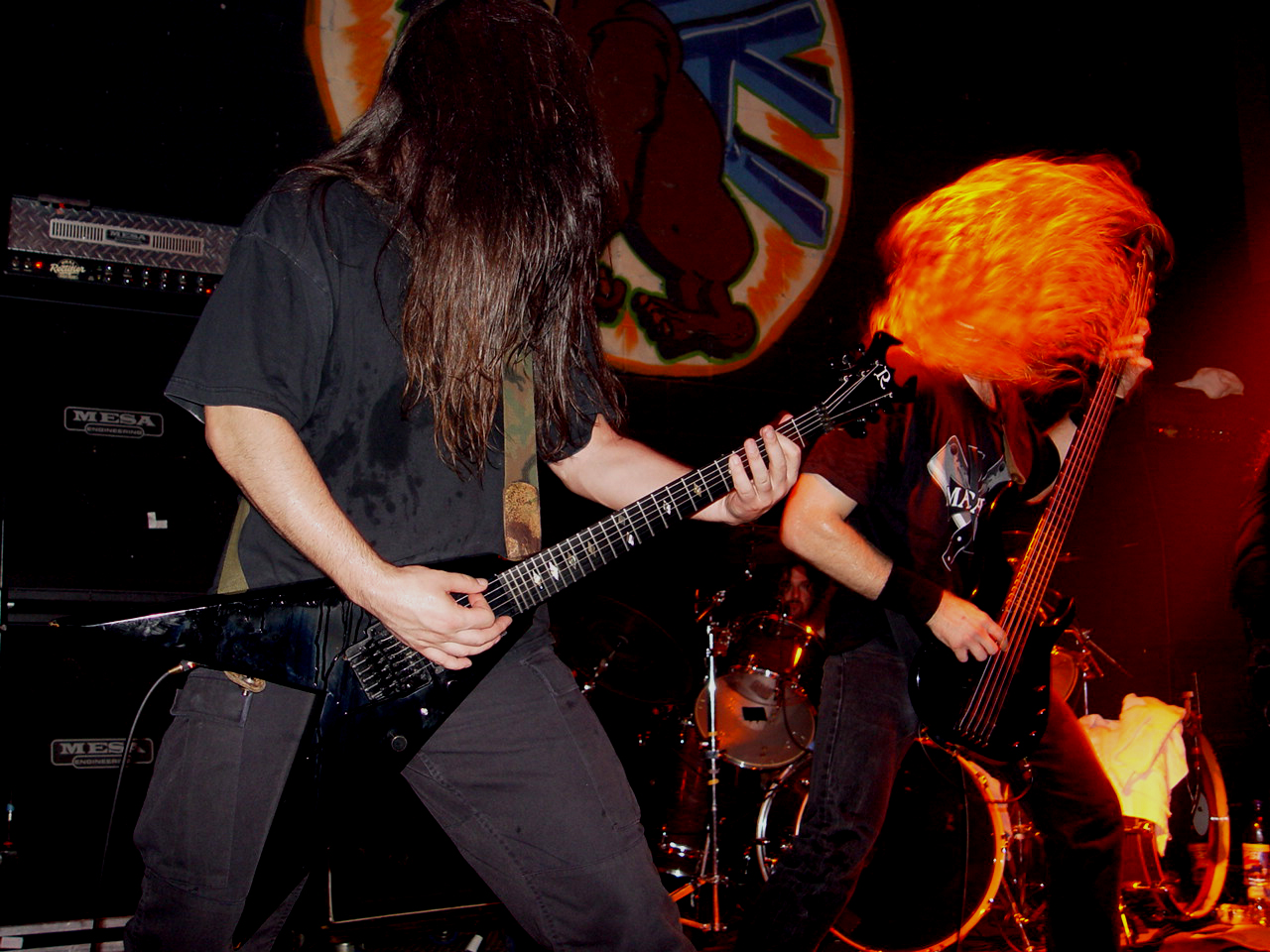
Cannibal Corpse performing in 2004

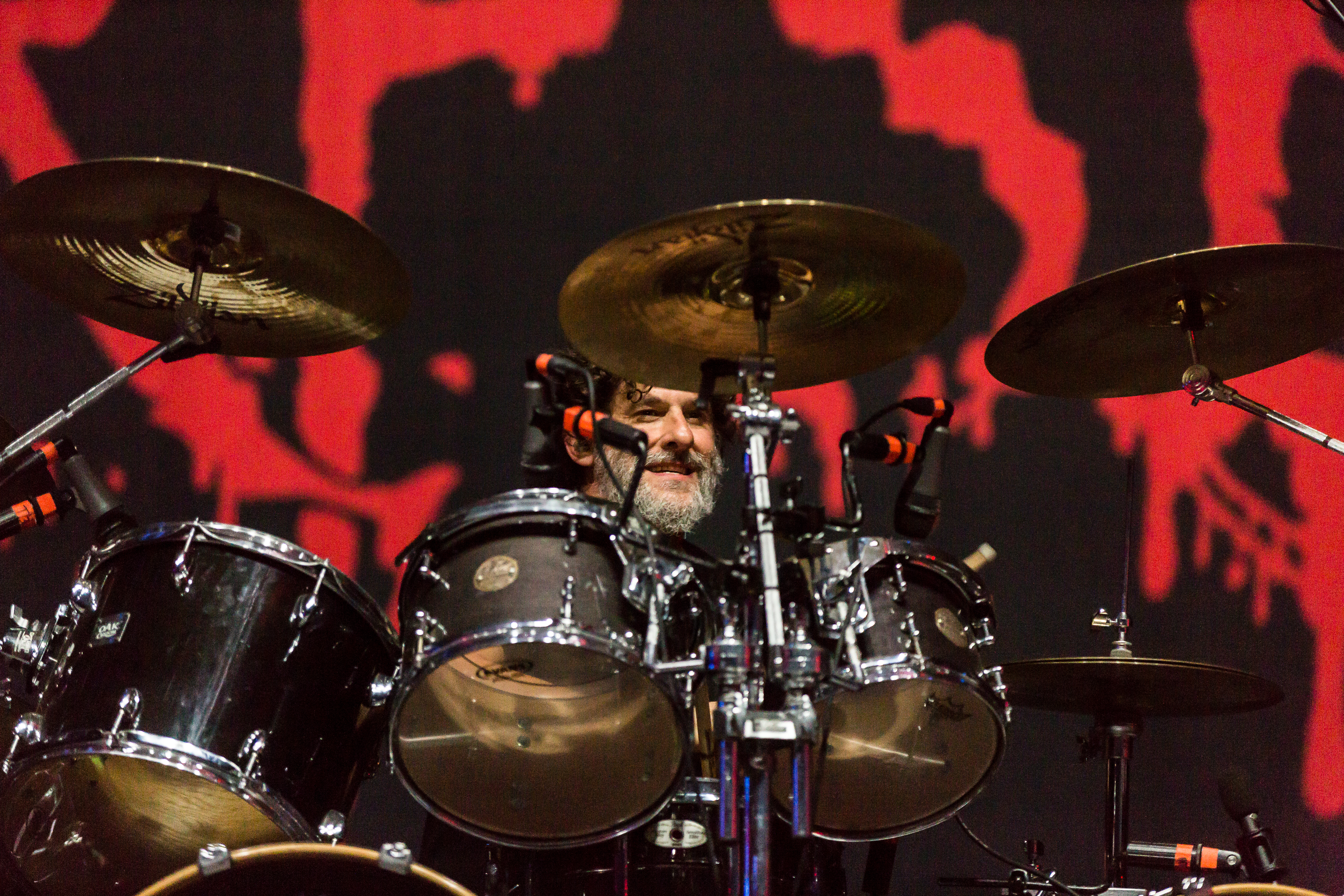
Drummer Paul Mazurkiewicz at Full Force 2019 at Ferropolis in Germany.

The band's songwriting incorporates hooks into its lyrics, and vocal cadences and guitar riffs. VICE News assessed that the band's third album, Tomb of the Mutilated "sounds like death metal as pop – the genre stripped to its basics." Webster said they wanted their songs to be catchy and memorable without sacrificing heaviness.

Chris Barnes' vocals on early Cannibal Corpse albums have been described as "indecipherable growls," while opting for a more intelligible style on The Bleeding. Barnes' vocals were generally characterized by a slower, groovier delivery style, while current vocalist George Fisher is noted for his highly intelligible, rapid-fire vocal delivery on later Cannibal Corpse releases, such as Vile and Kill.

According to Guitar World: "Webster's galloping three-finger technique unlocks speed and accuracy that other bassists can only dream of; remarkably, he achieves great attack and clarity without the need for a pick." Paul Mazurkiewicz' drumming style has been described as "tastefully sloppy".

=== Lyrical themes ===
[Barnes] was never writing any of these lyrics from the point of view that the characters in the songs were cool [...] or were people that he related to. [...] It's just interesting stuff to write about. If you have a movie with evil characters, people understand that the guy who made the movie doesn't relate to those characters. If you have a horror novel with evil characters in it – like a horror novel that features a rapist or a killer or a molester – you understand that the author doesn't relate to those characters, and isn't espousing that type of behavior. Neither are we. [...] Death metal is a type of horror music, and we’re not saying that any of the characters in our songs are people that we admire.

— Alex Webster of Cannibal Corpse,

The band's lyrics and song titles draw heavily on horror fiction, horror films and true crime. In the early years of the Florida death metal scene, the group was considered one of the most shocking and "least subtle" for its transgression of taste with its depiction of torture, murder, and mutilation, often in highly sexual, misogynistic and sadistic terms. According to Alex Webster, their gore theme came as a reaction to other Florida death metal bands being centered around antireligion. The band's lyrics have been characterized as "parading a revolting fascination with the human body," drawing comparisons to British extreme metal band Carcass, albeit "with a vividly cinematic perspective." Loudwire wrote that "it's hard to think of any other band so hyper-focused on tales of people getting killed in gruesome ways." George "Corpsegrinder" Fisher stated that the band does not sing about religion or politics, and described the band's songs as short stories that could be converted into horror films. According to Webster: "Just by watching the news you can find plenty of inspiration – and then on top of that, you've got all the great horror movies and novels out there. There's an unlimited amount of bad things happening in the world, real and imagined, so it's not too hard for us to come up with stuff." Guitarist Rob Barrett has expressed his belief that the lyrical possibilities in death metal are endless, and that limitations within the artform are nonexistent. He joked that "there's all [sorts of] new ways to talk about maming and killing and torturing."

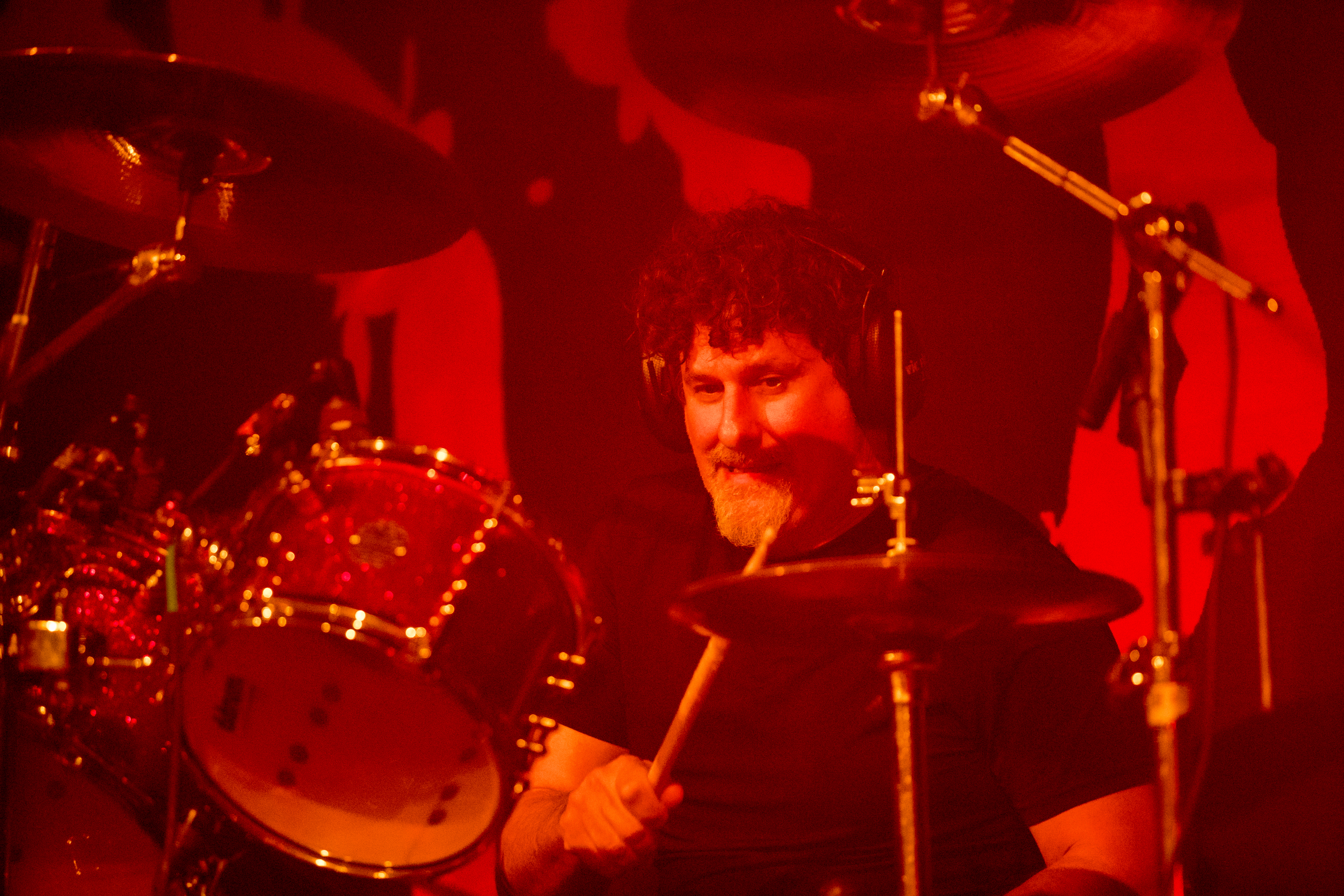
Following the dismissal of Chris Barnes, drummer Paul Mazurkiewicz assumed many duties related to composing lyrics and vocal cadences.

The lyrics written by original vocalist Chris Barnes are notorious for their extremity, being described as "ludicrously over the top" by AllMusic. Examples of macabre song titles from the band's early releases include "Entrails Ripped From a Virgin's Cunt", "Fucked With a Knife", "Addicted to Vaginal Skin", "Meat Hook Sodomy" and "Post Mortal Ejaculation". According to sociologist Natalie J. Purcell: "the lyrics of these songs contain terrifying lines describing morbid urges to slaughter and sexually exploit others, particularly the weak. Perhaps these songs are especially disturbing because they relate such tales from the perspective of the perpetrator." In his review of The Bleeding, Jason Birchmeier of AllMusic said that "it's worth noting for novices that this stuff isn't for the lighthearted and shouldn't be taken too seriously, even if songs titles like 'She Was Asking for It' perhaps go too far, even for this genre." Webster stated that the disturbing imagery and Barnes' lack of limitations were intentional to make a frightening story. Lyrical themes on later releases are considered to be more "toned down", beginning with Vile. The Quietus wrote: "Nowadays the horrors that they write about are more streamlined and precise, the equivalent of graduating from whacking a person on the head with a stick to dissecting someone with a scalpel."

The band has stated that many of their song titles are made first, with the lyrical pieces being written around them.

=== Live performances ===
Unlike other extreme metal bands, Cannibal Corpse uses no costumes, corpse paint, pyrotechnics or other stage props in their live performance, opting to simply use a large banner bearing the band's logo as their backdrop. The tracks "I Cum Blood", "Stripped, Raped and Strangled" and "Hammer Smashed Face" are almost always included in the band's live sets. When the band performs "I Cum Blood" live, Fisher usually introduces the song by saying: "This next song is about shooting blood out of your cock!" "A Skull Full of Maggots" from the band's debut album Eaten Back to Life is also a staple of the band's live sets.

Fisher employs a rapid windmill-style headbanging style, and routinely goads the crowd to attempt to keep up with him. Rob Barrett eventually stopped headbanging.

== Cultural impact and legacy ==
Alex Distefano of OC Weekly said Cannibal Corpse are "hands down, the undisputed kings of death metal." Quentin Thane Singer of Forbes said Cannibal Corpse are "by and large the face of the death metal sub-genre" and "one of metal’s most notorious and celebrated bands." Cannibal Corpse has been called "one of metal's goriest, most vile outfits." MusicRadar included the band on the site's list of the scariest bands or artists. In 2023, readers of Revolver voted Cannibal Corpse the "most brutal band of all time."

Many later death metal bands have copied the band's sound. Greg Prato of AllMusic said: "For the most part, as far as the genre of death metal goes, there is Cannibal Corpse, and there is a bunch of copycats." Bands known for emulating the band's sound during the 1990s have been dubbed "Cannibal Clones" by some publications. According to Chris Dick of Decibel: "I used to get a lot of demos back then and 9 out of 10 bands clearly had listened to Tomb of the Mutilated." Loudwire stated that the band are "almost solely responsible for the depraved lyrics that now permeate the genre." Cannibal Corpse has been cited as an influence by extreme metal and heavy metal bands of numerous subgenres, including The Black Dahlia Murder, Disgorge, Whitechapel, All Shall Perish, Suicide Silence, Carnifex, Slipknot, As I Lay Dying, All That Remains and Escape the Fate. According to Jon Weiderhorn of Loudwire, Cannibal Corpse was influential in the development of the "even more extreme" style of death metal, goregrind.

Some publications consider Cannibal Corpse to be among the greatest heavy metal bands of all time. The staff of Loudwire wrote in 2016: "When it comes to death metal, no band has been more consistent than Cannibal Corpse." Jordan Blum of Loudwire named Cannibal Corpse as one of the "Big Four" of death metal along with Death, Morbid Angel and The Black Dahlia Murder, and said the band were "perhaps the most widely memed group in [the genre]."

Cannibal Corpse has been referred to as "the AC/DC of death metal". Additionally, memes regarding the size of frontman George Fisher's neck became popular with the rise of social media.

== Controversy and censorship ==
"[The controversy] actually almost got me killed at gunpoint in 1994 before a show in East L.A. Some gang members came on the bus and told me they didn't like my lyrics. One of them had just got out of San Quentin, and he had a .38 [caliber] stuffed into his belt lining. He said, 'We're gonna kill you if you keep writing about this stuff.' I just tried to talk to him calmly and say, 'Hey, I respect your opinion,' but it was pretty scary. Luckily, we had a really good tour manager, who somehow got those guys off the bus."

— Chris Barnes interviewed by Revolver

Cannibal Corpse's lyrics, song titles, album covers and merchandise artwork frequently feature transgressive and macabre imagery, including depictions of extreme violence. Throughout their career, the band has consistently defended the violent imagery in their work as simply artistic expression that is clearly fictional. Joel McIver of The Quietus wrote: "Almost as depressing as the song themes is the regularity with which the members of Cannibal Corpse have been forced to explain that a) no, they don't take their violent lyrics seriously, b) no, they don't advise that anyone tries these things at home and c) no, they themselves are not violent or in any way generally extreme as human beings." Bassist Alex Webster said: "Most Western music is people singing from the heart — singing to a girlfriend, so a lot of people are freaked out by our songs". The band's album covers are watercolor paintings (most often done by comic book artist Vincent Locke) that draw heavily on horror fiction and horror films, and are highly controversial. At various points in the band's career, several countries, such as Germany and Russia, have banned the group from performing within their borders, or have banned the sale and display of original Cannibal Corpse album covers, which has consequently led to accompanying some of the band's albums with the original cover art with a censored, less explicit variant cover art for the same album. A practice which began with the third album, Tomb of the Mutilated (1992).

Webster recalled: "It got to the point where it entered global politics. That's something I never imagined, and I never heard [Senator] Joe Lieberman actually say these words, but he said this about us: '[Cannibal Corpse] is deplorable. They have a song about having sex with a severed head.' I wish I could have heard him say that shit. I'd love that sound bite." Vocalist George Fisher recalled being fine with people complaining on TV, as they were giving the band exposure to millions. Original vocalist Chris Barnes, who wrote the lyrics to the band's first four albums, said he wanted to write something exciting, and the controversy was more of a nuisance. According to Metal Blade Records president Brian Slagel, some local governments in Europe threatened to arrest them immediately if they played. Webster attributed their troubles to them being more visible and known than other bands who have even more gruesome lyrics than them.

The things we sing about in this band are incredibly brutal and negative -- we want everything in this band to be brutal and negative. Really. And that might sound strange to the average person, but it's what we want. You know, that's the way to make it effective death metal and to effectively capture the emotion we're going for. If you're gonna make music that sounds aggressive and hateful, then [obviously] the lyrics should also be aggressive and hateful. It makes complete sense to me. And if it's something that is about something negative, but it makes you feel good when you're done listening to it, and no one's been harmed by doing that, then there's nothing wrong with it at all. [...] I mean, we're not too surprised that people want to censor us, because most of the people who are in political offices [...] they were teenagers when Elvis was being censored for moving his hips around on Sullivan's Show. So people who grew up with that -- what are they going to think of a band that sings about eating people?!

— Alex Webster of Cannibal Corpse in the Making of the Wretched Spawn documentary

Fisher has stated that death metal is best understood as "art" and claims that far more violent art can be found at the Vatican; he expressed his belief that such depictions of violence are arguably more transgressive, as they actually happened. Fisher stated the band does not sing about religion or politics, and that the band's songs are simply fictional short stories that could be converted into horror films. Webster also defended their music as entertainment they enjoyed which was harmless.

Years ago, we had problems; we’d get a lot of people boycotting us and whatnot, but I think in the end—trust me, I’m married, I have a beautiful wife, I understand where people think we’re being insensitive to rape and things like that, we’re not being insensitive to that. I can understand how people would think that we’re glorifying it, but [same as when] movies have rape scenes in them—there are actual rapes that happen, unfortunately, in this world. We’re not condoning any of that, obviously.

— George Fisher of Cannibal Corpse, as quoted by Kim Kelly of Vice (November 3, 2017)

In response to accusations that his band's lyrics desensitize people to violence, Alex Webster argued death metal fans enjoy the music only because they know the violence depicted in its lyrics is not real. He argued "If you really saw someone get their brains bashed in right in front of you, I think it would have a pretty dramatic impact" regardless of how many movies or metal one experienced. He also noted that despite entertainment being more intense, society had improved and become more civilized over time. He also believes the violent lyrics can have positive value, saying "it's good to have anger music as a release."

George Fisher has dismissed the notion that extreme music undermines the youth, sarcastically saying: "Yeah, because we want people to get arrested and not come to our shows. We want regular jobs – great plan!” He also noted that the lyrics are not serious, and they are not about harming anybody in particular. When pressed on his personal feelings in regard to performing some of Barnes' more extreme lyrics, being the father of two daughters, he admitted he did not know if he would want to perform them if such things happened to his daughters, though he would "have to cross that bridge". He expressed understanding with the opinion that "If it’s happening with you and your daughters, you should feel that uncomfortable with everybody", and he was willing to hear people out.

=== United States ===
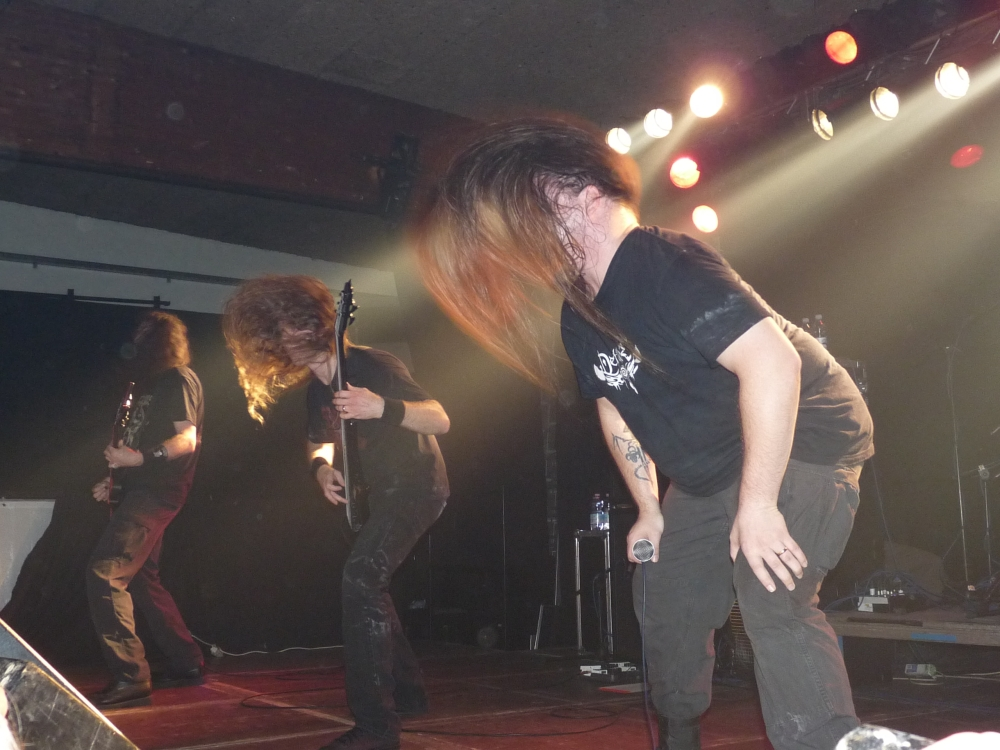
Cannibal Corpse have been subject to obscenity controversy since virtually the beginning of their career.

In May 1995, then-US Senator Bob Dole accused Cannibal Corpse—along with hip-hop acts including the Geto Boys and 2 Live Crew—of undermining the national character of the United States. A year later, the band came under fire again, this time as part of a campaign by William Bennett, Senator Joe Lieberman, then-Senator Sam Nunn, and National Congress of Black Women chair C. Delores Tucker to get major record labels—including Time Warner, Sony, Thorn-EMI, PolyGram and Bertelsmann—to "dump 20 recording groups [...] responsible for the most offensive lyrics".

=== Australia ===
As of October 23, 1996, the sale of any Cannibal Corpse audio recording then available was banned in Australia and all copies of such had been removed from music shops. At the time, the Australian Recording Industry Association and the Australian Music Retailers Association were implementing a system for identifying potentially offensive records, known as the "labelling code of practice".

All ten of Cannibal Corpse's albums, the live album Live Cannibalism, the boxed set 15 Year Killing Spree, the EP Worm Infested, and the single "Hammer Smashed Face" were re-released in Australia between 2006 and 2007, finally classified by ARIA and allowed for sale in Australia. However, they are all "restricted" and only sold to those over 18 years of age. Some are sold in "censored" and "uncensored" editions, which denotes the change of cover art. Despite this, when displayed in some stores, even the "uncensored" editions are censored manually.

After discussion of banning them from touring, Australian comedy act The Chaser did a lounge music version of their song "Rancid Amputation" on their show The Chaser's War on Everything, arguing that being able to perform the same song as lounge music on television proves that the music, and not the lyrics, is the problem.

=== Germany ===
In Germany, numerous albums have been indexed by the Federal Agency for Child and Youth Protection in the Media, which means that these albums may only be offered and sold to adults and must disappear from regular retail outlets.

- Eaten Back to Life (1990), on the index since August 1995
- Tomb of the Mutilated (1992), on the index since November 1995
- Hammer Smashed Face EP (1993), on the index since November 1995
- Worm Infested EP (2003), on the index since January 2005
- Evisceration Plague (2009), on the index since April 2010

The indexed songs may only be played in front of an adult audience and the organizer must ensure that no minors attend the event by means of an age check.

Some albums have even been confiscated by the courts and may no longer even be sold to adults.

- Butchered at Birth (1991), on the index since October 1991, confiscated since 1994
- Created to Kill (2000, a bootleg release consisting of demo recordings), on the index since August 2011, confiscated since November 2012
- Torture (2012), on the index since December 2012, confiscated since December 2013
- Vile (1996), on the index since September 2015, confiscated since July 2017

In a 2004 interview, George Fisher recalled the cause being that a schoolteacher saw one of their shirts. He said kids wanted them to play songs from their first three records but understood that they could not. He found it hypocritical that "We can't play 'Born in a Casket' but can play 'Dismembered and Molested'."

In a 2019 interview with Christa Jenal, the teacher behind the numerous banning proceedings, spoke about the band: "I have been dealing with the potential for brutalization in society for decades. In this context, I came across the band around 25 years ago because, as a teacher, I saw pupils wearing T-shirts depicting babies on grappling hooks. They were freely available on the market at the time. I've been educating people ever since. Cannibal Corpse is not the only band, but I see it as symptomatic of how far things can go when state institutions turn a blind eye.

=== Russia ===
Six of the eight planned shows from the band's 2014 Russian tour were canceled after protests from local Orthodox activists. A month before the tour, religious activist Dimitry Tsorionov said Cannibal Corpse's music was punishable under Russian law because it "incites religious division." He commented unfavorably on the lyrics, saying they promoted "death, violence, as well as various kinds of sexual perversion." The gig in Nizhny Novgorod was stopped halfway through the set, after police conducted a search for drugs at the venue. The concert in Saint Petersburg was canceled at the last minute because of unspecified "technical reasons", OMON arrived shortly after and arrested eighteen concertgoers. Cannibal Corpse members stated that Russian authorities threatened to detain the members if they performed because they did not have the correct work visas.

== Band members ==
Cannibal Corpse at Rockharz Open Air 2018

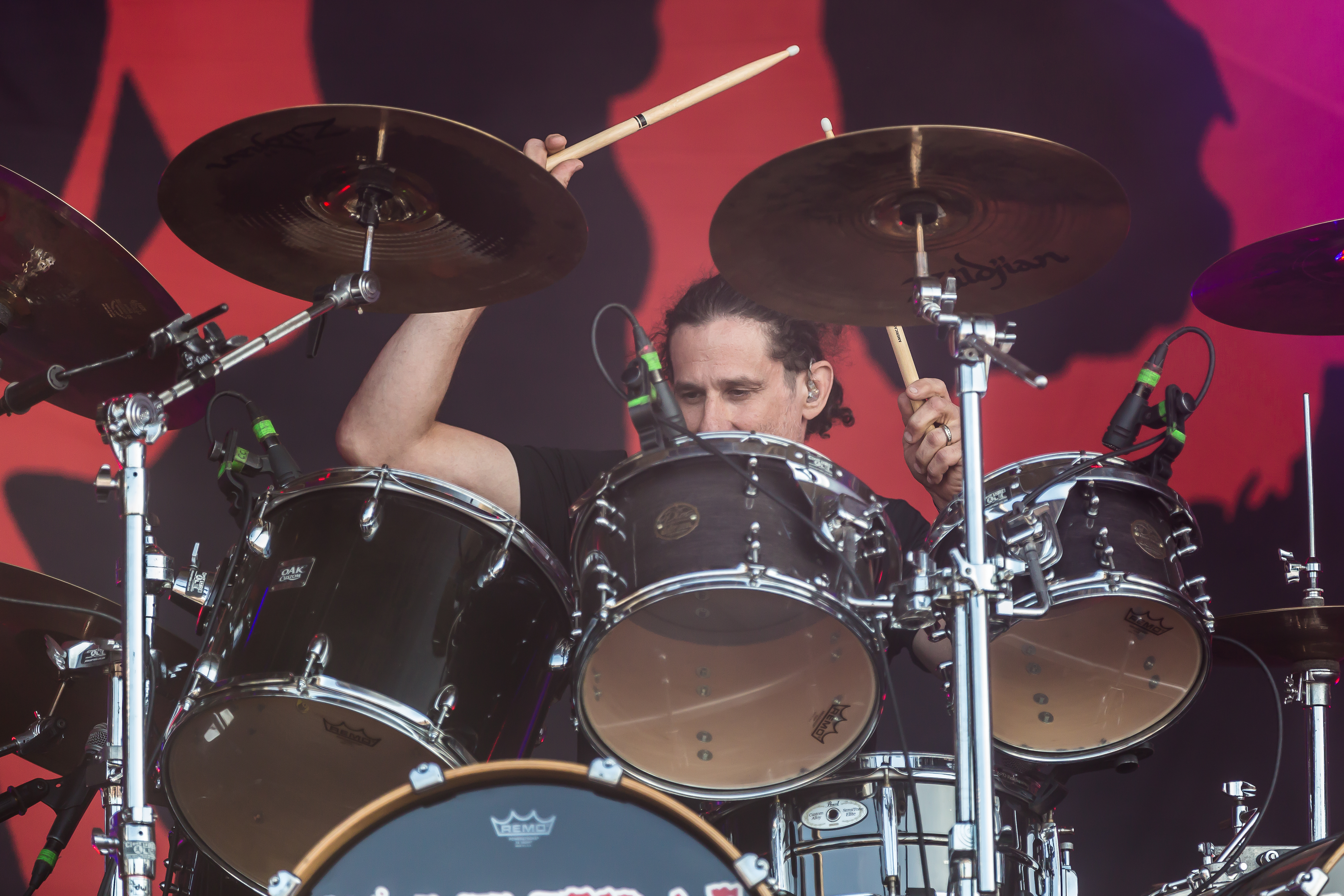
Paul Mazurkiewicz

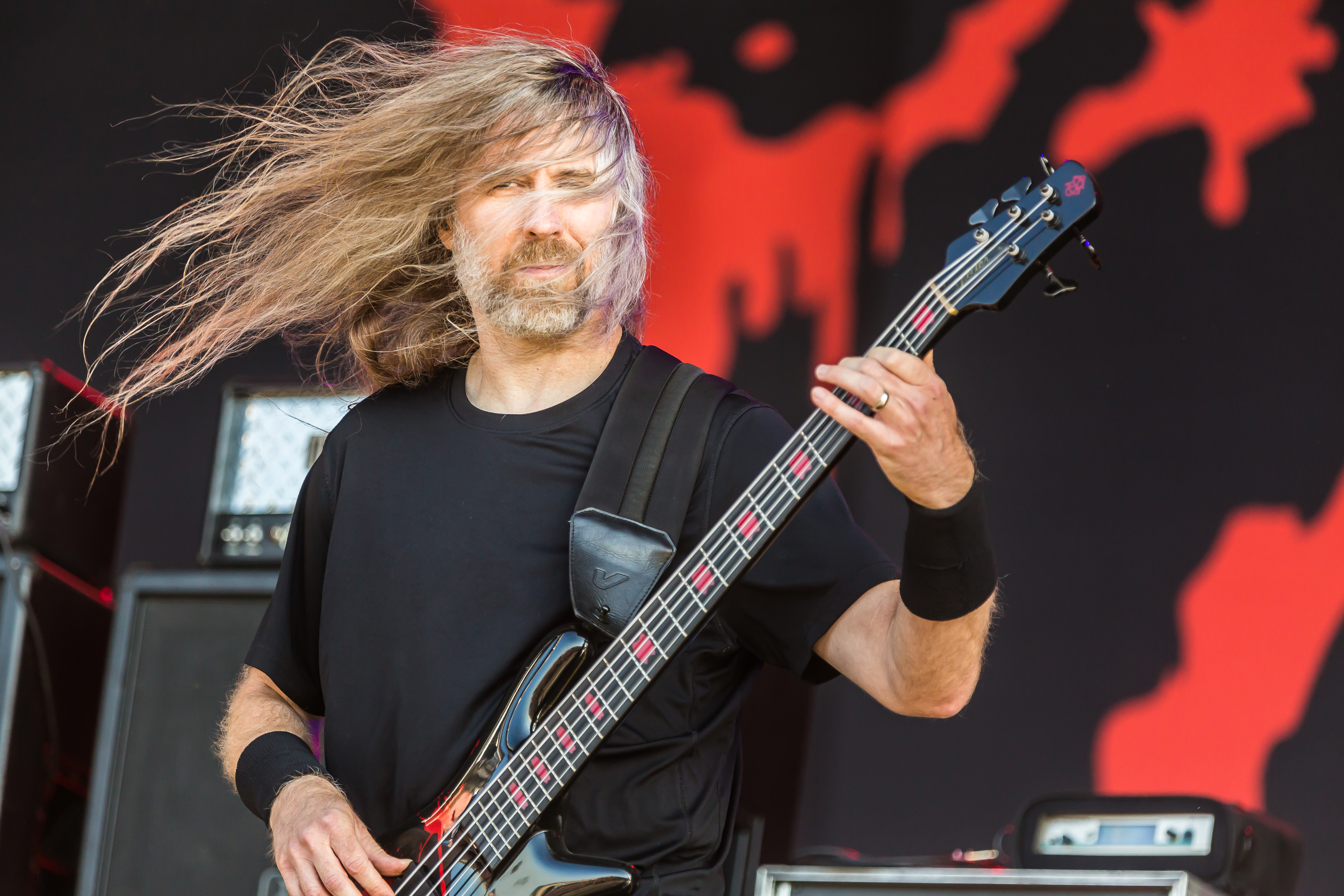
Alex Webster

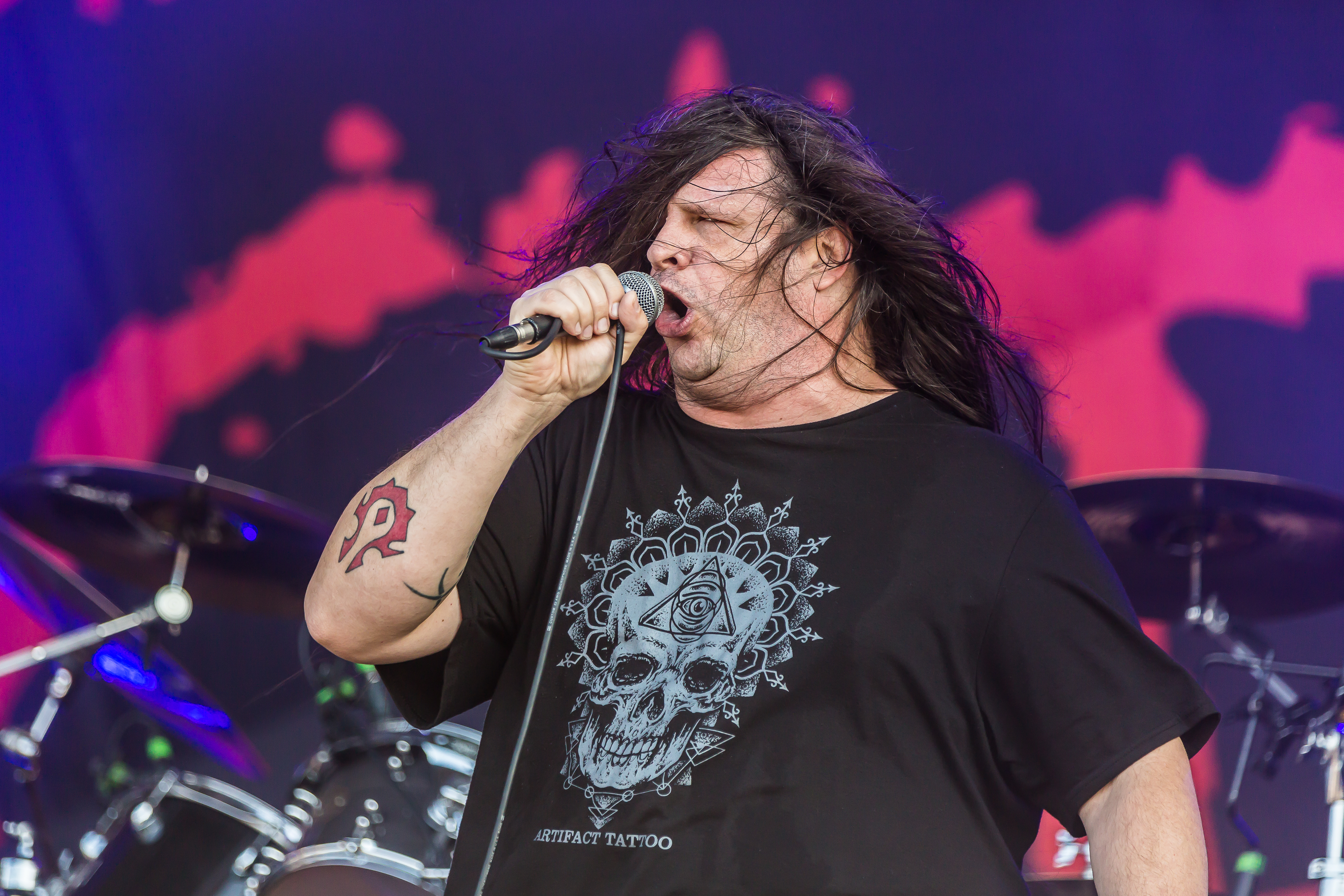
George "Corpsegrinder" Fisher

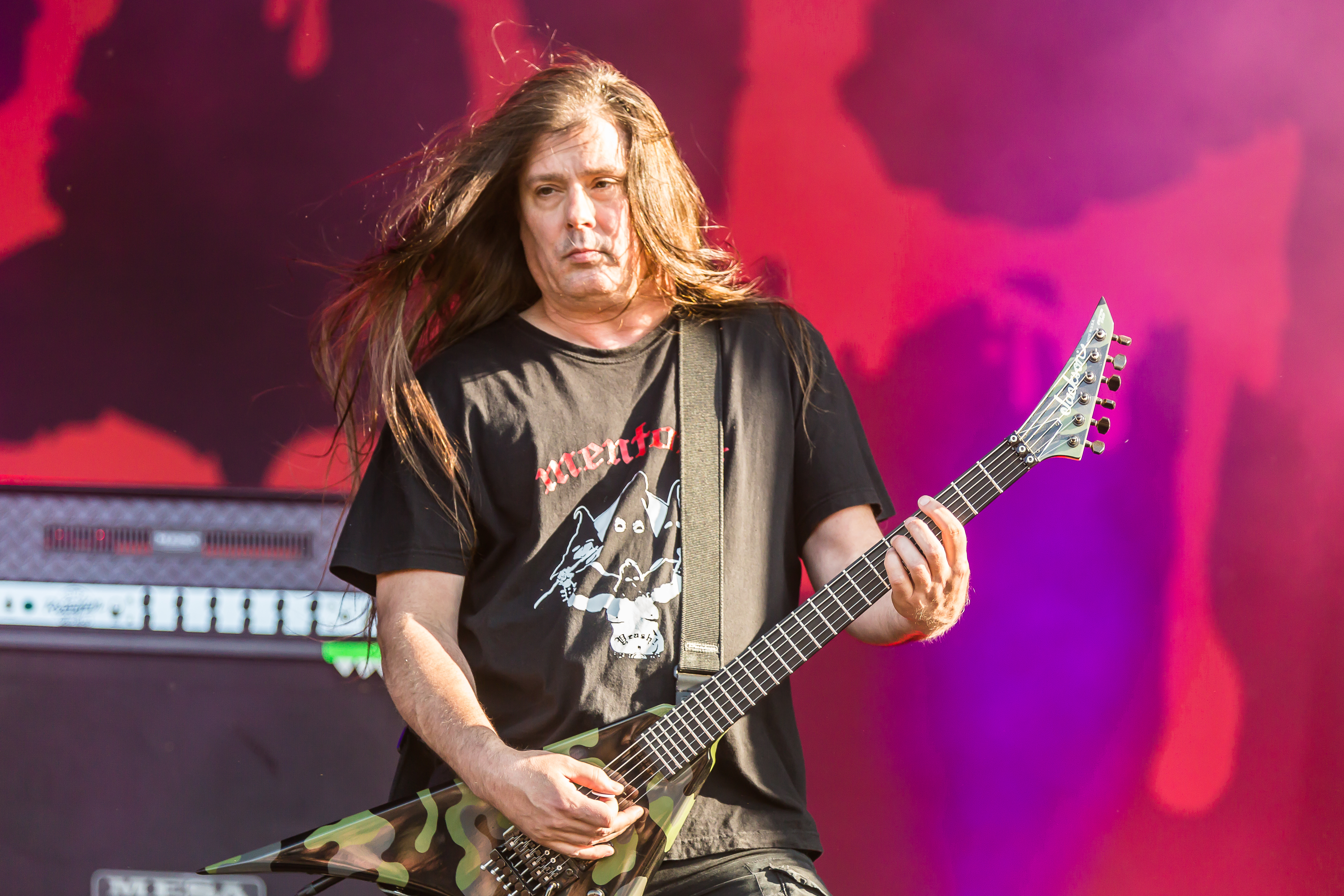
Pat O'Brien

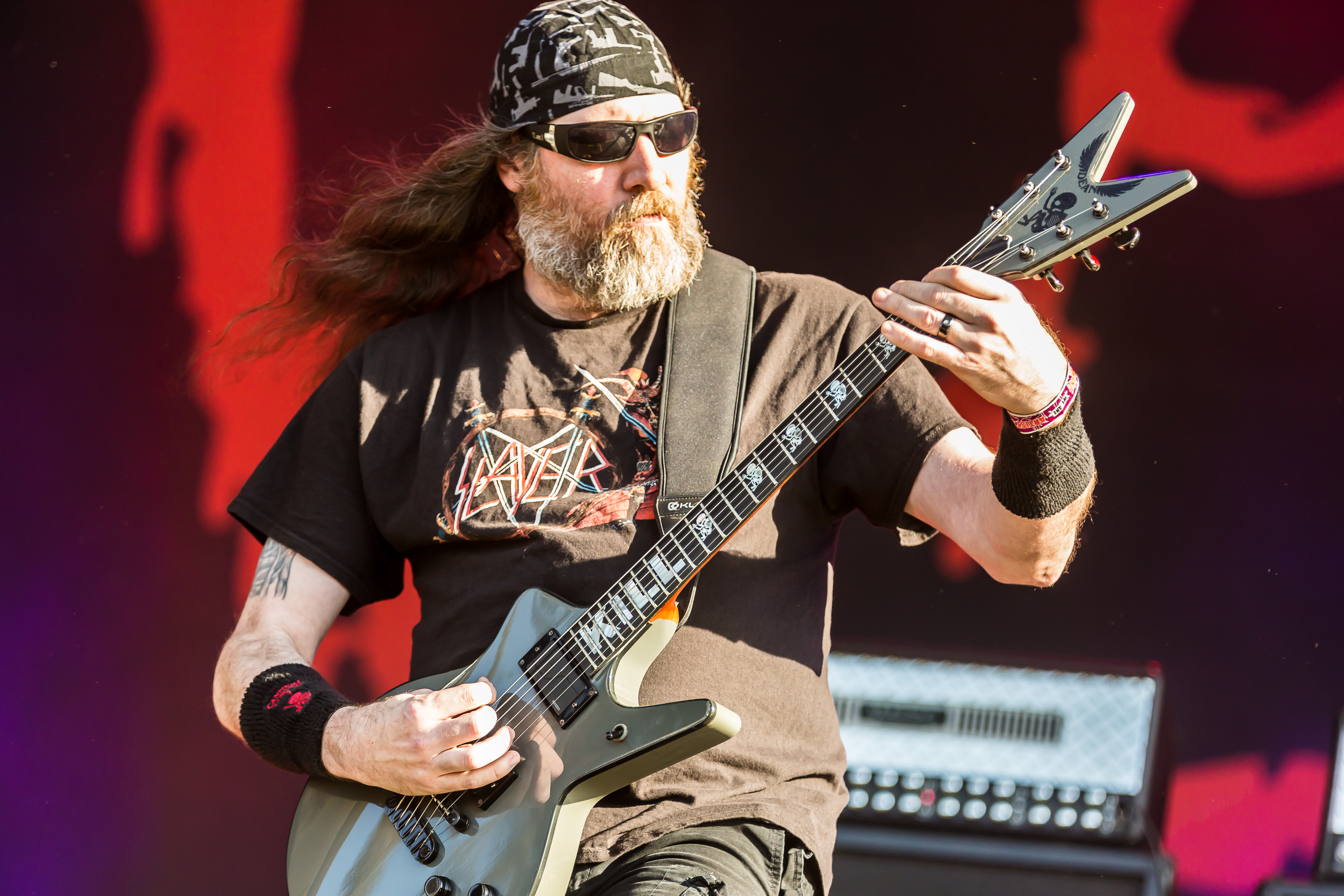
Rob Barrett

Current

- Paul Mazurkiewicz – drums (1988–present)
- Alex Webster – bass (1988–present)
- Rob Barrett – rhythm guitar (2005–present), lead guitar (1993-1997)
- George "Corpsegrinder" Fisher – lead vocals (1995–present)
- Erik Rutan – lead guitar, backing vocals (2021–present; touring 2019–2021)

Former

- Jack Owen – rhythm guitar (1988–2004)
- Chris Barnes – vocals (1988–1995)
- Bob Rusay – lead guitar (1988–1993)
- Pat O'Brien – lead guitar (1997–2021; inactive 2018–2021)

Touring

- Jeremy Turner – rhythm guitar (2004–2005)
- Brandon Ellis – rhythm guitar (2025)

Timeline

Recording timeline

Role	Album															
Role	Eaten Back to Life (1990)	Butchered at Birth (1991)	Tomb of the Mutilated (1992)	The Bleeding (1994)	Vile (1996)	Gallery of Suicide (1998)	Bloodthirst (1999)	Gore Obsessed (2002)	The Wretched Spawn (2004)	Kill (2006)	Evisceration Plague (2009)	Torture (2012)	A Skeletal Domain (2014)	Red Before Black (2017)	Violence Unimagined (2021)	Chaos Horrific (2023)
Vocals	Chris Barnes	Chris Barnes	Chris Barnes	Chris Barnes	George "Corpsegrinder" Fisher	George "Corpsegrinder" Fisher	George "Corpsegrinder" Fisher	George "Corpsegrinder" Fisher	George "Corpsegrinder" Fisher	George "Corpsegrinder" Fisher	George "Corpsegrinder" Fisher	George "Corpsegrinder" Fisher	George "Corpsegrinder" Fisher	George "Corpsegrinder" Fisher	George "Corpsegrinder" Fisher	George "Corpsegrinder" Fisher
Lead Guitar	Bob Rusay	Bob Rusay	Bob Rusay	Rob Barrett	Rob Barrett	Pat O'Brien	Pat O'Brien	Pat O'Brien	Pat O'Brien	Pat O'Brien	Pat O'Brien	Pat O'Brien	Pat O'Brien	Pat O'Brien	Erik Rutan	Erik Rutan
Rhythm Guitar	Jack Owen	Jack Owen	Jack Owen	Jack Owen	Jack Owen	Jack Owen	Jack Owen	Jack Owen	Jack Owen	Rob Barrett	Rob Barrett	Rob Barrett	Rob Barrett	Rob Barrett	Rob Barrett	Rob Barrett
Bass	Alex Webster	Alex Webster	Alex Webster	Alex Webster	Alex Webster	Alex Webster	Alex Webster	Alex Webster	Alex Webster	Alex Webster	Alex Webster	Alex Webster	Alex Webster	Alex Webster	Alex Webster	Alex Webster
Drums	Paul Mazurkiewicz	Paul Mazurkiewicz	Paul Mazurkiewicz	Paul Mazurkiewicz	Paul Mazurkiewicz	Paul Mazurkiewicz	Paul Mazurkiewicz	Paul Mazurkiewicz	Paul Mazurkiewicz	Paul Mazurkiewicz	Paul Mazurkiewicz	Paul Mazurkiewicz	Paul Mazurkiewicz	Paul Mazurkiewicz	Paul Mazurkiewicz	Paul Mazurkiewicz

== Discography ==
Studio albums

- Eaten Back to Life (1990)
- Butchered at Birth (1991)
- Tomb of the Mutilated (1992)
- The Bleeding (1994)
- Vile (1996)
- Gallery of Suicide (1998)
- Bloodthirst (1999)
- Gore Obsessed (2002)
- The Wretched Spawn (2004)
- Kill (2006)
- Evisceration Plague (2009)
- Torture (2012)
- A Skeletal Domain (2014)
- Red Before Black (2017)
- Violence Unimagined (2021)
- Chaos Horrific (2023)

== Accolades ==
Cannibal Corpse was inducted into the Buffalo Music Hall of Fame in 2013 and the Metal Hall of Fame in 2025. Their song "Hammer Smashed Face" won the "Greatest Death Metal Song" Award from Metal Hammer Germany in 2009.

== See also ==
- Cannabis Corpse
