= Kill (Cannibal Corpse album) =

Studio album by Cannibal Corpse
- Released: March 21, 2006
- Recorded: October–December 2005
- Studios: Mana Recording Studios, St. Petersburg, Florida
- Genre: Death metal
- Length: 42:10
- Label: Metal Blade
- Producer: Erik Rutan

Cannibal Corpse chronology
The Wretched Spawn (2004)	Kill (2006)	Evisceration Plague (2009)

Kill is the tenth studio album by American death metal band Cannibal Corpse, released on March 21, 2006, through Metal Blade Records. This release marks the return of guitarist Rob Barrett, who had previously played on The Bleeding and Vile. The European version of the album comes with a live DVD filmed in Strasbourg in 2004 called Hammer Smashed Laiterie. The album was produced at Mana Recording Studios by Hate Eternal and future Cannibal Corpse guitarist Erik Rutan. It is also the first album in which the band tuned down to G♯ standard.

Music videos were produced for the tracks "Make Them Suffer" and "Death Walking Terror".

In the week following its release, Kill became the second Cannibal Corpse album to make an appearance on the Billboard 200 chart, debuting at number 170. It is considered an essential album in the band's discography. The track "Make Them Suffer" has become a fan favorite, and is also considered by Loudwire to be among their greatest songs.

== Background and recording ==
Alex Webster spoke of the departure of guitarist Jack Owen and the return of guitarist Rob Barrett: "We knew that we'd be able to make a huge improvement this time around, because Jack's motivation had been on the decline for a long time. He had a few ups and downs and he did write a couple of killer songs here and there, but some of the material he was bringing to the table was becoming a lot slower, more straightforward, and quite different from what me and Pat like to do. We knew that the new album was going to be faster and more complex than anything we've done over the last couple of records, not so much by the addition of Rob, but by the absence of Jack; and then Rob's style is closer to the stuff that, say, Pat would write, or I would write. Paul also contributed a song and that turned out to be quite technical. So, you know, all those songs are pretty tough to play, as opposed to what Jack would have done. Now, like I said, we liked Jack's stuff, but we weren't concerned by his leaving, because we knew that with how he had been feeling about the band and stuff like that, when he did leave it was actually a relief in some sense. I'm not saying that to talk crap about him, because he's a great guy and a great guitar player."

== Music and lyrics ==
Called the "quintessential Cannibal Corpse" album, Kill has been described as having an "old school vibe," and was seen as a return to form for Cannibal Corpse, with a style similar to that of Vile. AllMusic said the album was like "a bloody hug from an old friend." About.com described the album's sound as "brutal, devastating death metal." The songwriting and compositions on Kill are said to be more precise and technically proficient than on previous releases. The album's basslines have been described as "thick and gooey," and the guitar work has been described as "sickeningly crunchy." The harmonies between Pat O'Brien and Rob Barrett have been called "ominous." George Fisher's vocal performance on the album employs a combination of screams and growls, which have been described as sounding "psychotic." The album contains tempo changes that have been called "tricky." The album's closing track "Infinite Misery" is an instrumental.

Lyrical themes explored on the album include death by boiling.

== Artwork ==
The album cover is notable for being one of the very few Cannibal Corpse albums to omit explicit gore imagery. Kill is the first to not fearure such. In an interview, bassist Webster explained that the decision stemmed from the band’s inability to reach a consensus for the artwork. He further noted that the group wished to encourage listeners to concentrate on the music itself rather than be influenced or distracted by a violent visual presentation. He stated "this time they wanted to do something different."

Cannibal Corpse band members recalled, "The original art that Vince [Locke] gave us was really cool, but we didn't think it would make the best cover. We decided to use it as interior art, and just have a simple band logo/album title type cover. The main focus of our band should be music anyway, so I don't think it's a big deal that the cover's not a blood soaked scene of carnage the way our others have been. This doesn't mean we won't have more bloody covers in the future though." Fisher stated "There’s no dead babies hanging, there’s no torture cover with a bunch of bodies hanging, there’s no corpse sex, none of that is there. It just says 'KILL.'"

== Reception and legacy ==
Professional ratings
Review scores
Source	Rating
About.com	4.5/5 stars
AllMusic	3.5/5 stars
Blabbermouth	8.5/10
Collector's Guide to Heavy Metal	8/10
Metal Storm	8.0/10

The album received positive reviews from critics. AllMusic gave it a 3.5 out of 5 rating, stating that "Kill doesn't break any new ground for the veteran sickos, but if it ain't broke don't fix it -- just turn it up louder", while also commenting that the songs are "13 aural assaults that will be welcomed by fans with open mouths"; About.com gave the album a 4.5 out of 5 rating.

Kill was considered a "turning point" in the band's career. Denise Falzon of Exclaim! wrote, "After releasing a series of arguably mediocre albums that lacked the vigour and intensity of their early efforts, the band were joined once again by guitarist Rob Barrett for his first record with Cannibal Corpse in ten years. Coupled with production by Hate Eternal's Erik Rutan, the results were remarkable." Greg Pratt of Exclaim! wrote, "Everything about this album was right: maybe it was the timing, maybe it was that a lot of people who got into Cannibal Corpse as 15-year-olds were just ready for a perfect, solid death metal album from Cannibal at this point. Whatever it was, the band were firing on all cylinders, crafting a perfect example of few-frills Floridian death metal with just enough technicality to shut up anyone who considers complaining."

In 2018, Kill was inducted into Decibel Magazine's Hall of Fame via a special Cannibal Corpse issue. Metal Hammer placed Kill at number 37 on its list of "The 50 best death metal albums ever", calling it the band's finest album.

In 2021, Brad Sanders of Stereogum named Kill as the best Cannibal Corpse album. He wrote: "Almost two decades in, they had finally found a producer who could make their recorded work match the intensity of their peerless live show. [...] The band lived up to their new collaborator’s high standard, delivering 13 flawless songs. The solos are as liberated and wild as the riffs are disciplined and tight, and Corpsegrinder delivers the best vocal performance of his career. 'Make Them Suffer' was even a minor MTV hit on the resurrected Headbanger’s Ball, putting Cannibal in front of a new generation of fans too young to have watched America get scandalized by Tomb Of The Mutilated. For once, the kids got the better end of the deal."

== Track listing ==
No.	Title	Lyrics	Music	Length
1.	"The Time to Kill Is Now"	Webster	Webster	2:03
2.	"Make Them Suffer"	Mazurkiewicz	O'Brien	2:50
3.	"Murder Worship"	Webster	Webster	3:56
4.	"Necrosadistic Warning"	Webster	Webster	3:28
5.	"Five Nails Through the Neck"	Webster	Webster	3:45
6.	"Purification by Fire"	Mazurkiewicz	O'Brien	2:57
7.	"Death Walking Terror"	Webster	Webster	3:31
8.	"Barbaric Bludgeonings"	Barrett	Barrett	3:42
9.	"The Discipline of Revenge"	Webster	Webster	3:39
10.	"Brain Removal Device"	Mazurkiewicz	O'Brien	3:14
11.	"Maniacal"	Webster	Webster	2:12
12.	"Submerged in Boiling Flesh"	Mazurkiewicz	Mazurkiewicz	2:52
13.	"Infinite Misery" (instrumental)		O'Brien	4:01
Total length:				42:10

Bonus DVD: Hammer Smashed Laiterie
No.	Title	Length
1.	"Shredded Humans"	5:11
2.	"Puncture Wound Massacre"	2:08
3.	"Fucked with a Knife"	3:01
4.	"Stripped, Raped, and Strangled"	4:20
5.	"Decency Defied"	4:25
6.	"Vomit the Soul"	5:57
7.	"Unleashing the Bloodthirsty"	4:32
8.	"Pounded into Dust"	3:10
9.	"The Cryptic Stench"	4:10
10.	"They Deserve to Die"	4:11
11.	"Dormant Bodies Bursting"	3:02
12.	"Gallery of Suicide"	4:51
13.	"Pit of Zombies"	5:09
14.	"The Wretched Spawn"	4:59
15.	"Devoured by Vermin"	5:27
16.	"A Skull Full of Maggots"	3:33
17.	"Hammer Smashed Face"	7:26
Total length:		75:32

== Personnel ==
Writing, performance and production credits are adapted from the album liner notes.

=== Cannibal Corpse ===
- George "Corpsegrinder" Fisher – vocals
- Pat O'Brien – lead guitar
- Rob Barrett – rhythm guitar
- Alex Webster – bass
- Paul Mazurkiewicz – drums

=== Additional musicians ===
- Erik Rutan – backing vocals on "The Time to Kill Is Now"

=== Production ===
- Erik Rutan – production, engineering, mixing
- Shawn Ohtani – additional engineering
- Alan Douches – mastering

=== Artwork and design ===
- Vincent Locke – cover art
- Brian Ames – design
- Alex Solca – photography

=== Studios ===
- Mana Recording Studios, St. Petersburg, FL, USA – recording, mixing
- West Westside Music – mastering

== Charts ==
Chart	Peak position
French Albums (SNEP)	187
German Albums (Offizielle Top 100)	59
UK Independent Albums (Official Charts)	43
UK Rock & Metal Albums (Official Charts)	36
US Billboard 200	170
US Independent Albums (Billboard)	16
US Heatseekers Albums (Billboard)	6
