= Paul Mazurkiewicz =

American drummer (born 1968)

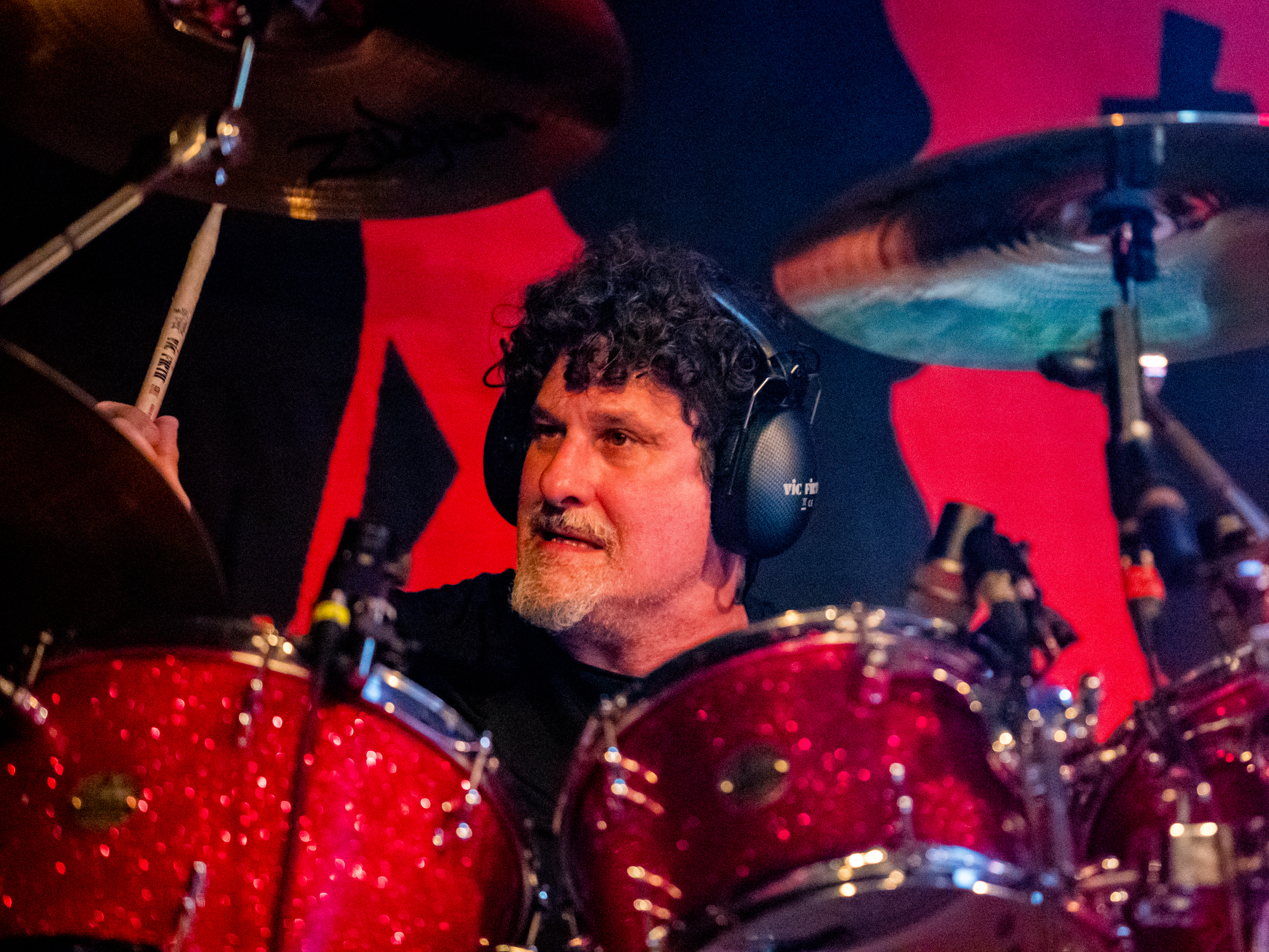
- Mazurkiewicz with Cannibal Corpse in 2024

Background information
- Born: Paul Mazurkiewicz, Jr. September 8, 1968 (age 57); Great Falls, Montana, U.S.
- Origin: Buffalo, New York, U.S.
- Genres: Death metal; thrash metal; crossover thrash
- Occupation: Musician
- Instrument: Drums
- Years active: 1987–present
- Member of: Cannibal Corpse; Umbilicus; Heaven's Gate

Paul Mazurkiewicz Jr. (/məˈzɜːrkəwɪts/ mə-ZER-kə-wits; born September 8, 1968) is an American musician best known as the drummer of the death metal band Cannibal Corpse.

== Musical career ==
Mazurkiewicz was originally inspired to play music by Kiss. His cousin was a drummer, and introduced him to the music of Van Halen and Rush. Mazurkiewicz started off playing guitar before deciding to focus on drums. He spray-painted his first drum kit black because it was “not metal enough.” Mazurkiewicz's biggest influence in his youth was Slayer drummer Dave Lombardo. He said, "Dave Lombardo is my biggest influence, of course. If it wasn't for him, I probably wouldn't be doing what I'm doing. He's the king of thrash, double bass and all that, so as a teenager, hearing him play in the mid-'80s, obviously I wasn't playing at that point yet — I [was] just starting out — so that really solidified me wanting to play the way I play today, what he was doing and still is doing." Additionally, he cited band such as Iron Maiden, Metallica, Slayer, Kreator, and Death Angel as influences during his formative years.

=== Cannibal Corpse ===
Mazurkiewicz was originally the drummer for the band Tirant Sin alongside two other future Cannibal Corpse members, Chris Barnes and Bob Rusay. The trio joined Alex Webster and Jack Owen in 1988, forming Cannibal Corpse. Mazurkiewicz, along with Webster, is one of two remaining original members of the band.

Aside from drumming, Mazurkiewicz also plays the guitar, and is the group's primary lyricist and contributes heavily to composing songs; he penned the songs "Dead Human Collection", "Frantic Disembowelment", "Monolith", "Carrion Sculpted Entity", and "Worm Infested". Beginning with Kill, he began composing entire songs by himself on guitar (excluding guitar solos).

=== Umbilicus ===
In 2022, Mazurkiewicz co-founded Umbilicus, a 1970s-style hard rock group with Deicide guitarist Taylor Nordberg.

=== Heaven's Gate ===
Mazurkiewicz plays drums in Heaven's Gate, a crossover thrash project featuring Municipal Waste vocalist Tony Foresta.

== Artistry ==
Mazurkiewicz is a self-taught drummer, and developed his craft by emulating and "making [his] own version" of the stylings of Morbid Angel's Pete Sandoval.

== Personal life ==
Mazurkiewicz divorced in 2019. He has one daughter. He became a vegetarian in 2002 and he lives with his family and animals on a farm-like property including a couple of acres of land.
