= Centuries of Torment: The First 20 Years =

Video by Cannibal Corpse
- Released: July 8, 2008
- Recorded: 1987–2007
- Genre: Death metal
- Label: Metal Blade
- Producer: Denise Korycki

Cannibal Corpse chronology
Live Cannibalism (2000)	Centuries of Torment: The First 20 Years (2008)	Global Evisceration (2011)

Professional ratings
Review scores
Source	Rating
About.com	4.5/5 stars
Blabbermouth.net	10/10 stars
Decibel	10/10 stars
PopMatters	10/10 stars

Centuries of Torment: The First 20 Years is the third video album by American death metal band Cannibal Corpse, released in 2008. It contains a three-hour documentary on the history of the band and several concert performances as extra features. It was released on July 8 in USA and July 14 in Europe. This DVD has also been certified platinum in Canada.

Scott Alisoglu described the documentary and bonus material as containing "pretty much every tidbit of information you would ever want."

== Background ==
The documentary contains not only interviews with the band members, but from musicians within the Florida death metal scene as well. Webster said:

"I guess when you look at it, [if] you're really going to talk about any death metal band that's been around for as long as us, then you're probably going to end up talking about a lot of other bands along the way. All of us have done so many shows together, we've all recorded at the same studios, and we've all been friends with each other and that sort of thing. We've influenced one another. I'm really happy that there are all these other bands featured in it and talked about because to me it makes it more interesting because I already know all the stuff about our band because I'm in the band. It's a lot of fun to see like Lee Harrison talking about some of the Florida death metal bands that recorded at Morrisound Studio and that sort of thing. Denise just did a great job and that was all her doing, putting it together that way. It's cool stuff. The whole thing is really interesting. When she told me the first disc was going to be over three hours long, just the history portion [...] she was like, 'Oh yeah, it's a little over three hours.' Wow! Is there any way to make our band interesting for over three hours [laughs]? And she did it. A lot of that is by incorporating the larger story of American death metal."

Webster said the documentary "had Barnes all over it." He continued: "We had to make sure he got involved; he’s been out of the band since 1995, but his lyrics and the creative drive that he had in the beginning really helped shape the lyrical direction that the band went in. [...] We obviously had our differences, but he did add a whole lot to the band. Out of all of the ex-members, he’s obviously the one that people talk about the most and he definitely needs to be involved when we’re doing retrospectives."

Former guitarist Bob Rusay did not appear in the documentary. In an interview with Blabbermouth, bassist Alex Webster was quoted saying:

"As far as we knew he didn't want anything to do with the band anymore, and then Decibel wound up getting him and that was right toward the end of the making of the DVD. [...] They managed to get Bob to do an interview, so we reached out to him and [the documentary's producer] Denise tried to get in contact. She left a few messages and he never responded and we heard that he's still angry with us about the whole thing and wanted to leave it all behind him so we didn't want to bother him any further. He did the interview with Decibel and I think he wanted to leave it at that."

== Disc one ==
=== 1987–1995 ===
- Intro
- Demo
- Eaten Back to Life
- Butchered at Birth
- Tomb of the Mutilated
- The Bleeding

==== 1996–2007 ====
- Vile
- Gallery of Suicide
- Bloodthirst
- Gore Obsessed
- The Wretched Spawn
- Kill

== Disc two ==
=== Cannibal Corpse performances ===
==== With Full Force 2007 (Löbnitz, Germany) ====
1. "Unleashing the Bloodthirsty"
2. "Murder Worship"
3. "Disposal of the Body"

==== Toronto 2006 ====
1. "The Time to Kill Is Now"
2. "Disfigured"
3. "Death Walking Terror"
4. "Covered With Sores"
5. "Born in a Casket"
6. "I Cum Blood"
7. "Decency Defied"
8. "Make Them Suffer"
9. "Dormant Bodies Bursting"
10. "Five Nails Through the Neck"
11. "Devoured by Vermin"
12. "Hammer Smashed Face"
13. "Stripped, Raped and Strangled"

==== Party San 2005 ====
1. "Puncture Wound Massacre"
2. "Sentenced to Burn"
3. "Fucked with a Knife"
4. "Psychotic Precision"
5. "Pulverized"
6. "Pounded into Dust"
7. "The Wretched Spawn"

==== New York 2000 ====
1. "The Spine Splitter"
2. "Dead Human Collection"

==== Jacksonville 1996 ====
1. "Mummified in Barbed Wire"

==== Nashville 1994 ====
1. "Entrails Ripped from a Virgin's Cunt"
2. "Pulverized"

==== Buffalo 1989 ====
1. "Shredded Humans"
2. "Rotting Head"

==== Music videos ====
- "Staring Through the Eyes of the Dead"
- "Devoured by Vermin"
- "Sentenced to Burn"
- "Decency Defied"
- "Death Walking Terror"
- "Make Them Suffer"
- "Stripped, Raped and Strangled" 2007 (with The Black Dahlia Murder's Trevor Strnad)

== Disc three ==
=== Bonus chunks ===
- Compelled to Illustrate
- Every Ban Broken
- Covered with Ink
- Maniacal Merch
- Relentless Touring
- Word Infested
- Sickening Metalocalypse
- Diverse Offerings
- Staring Through the Eyes of the Band
- Kill Crane

== Band line up ==
Current members

- George "Corpsegrinder" Fisher – vocals (1995–present)
- Erik Rutan – lead guitar, backing vocals (2021–present; touring 2019–2021)
- Rob Barrett – lead guitar (1993–1997); rhythm guitar (2005–present)
- Alex Webster – bass (1988–present)
- Paul Mazurkiewicz – drums (1988–present)

Past members

- Chris Barnes – vocals (1988–1995)
- Bob Rusay – lead guitar (1988–1993)
- Jack Owen – rhythm guitar (1988–2004)
- Jeremy Turner – rhythm guitar (2004–2005)
- Pat O'Brien – lead guitar (1997–2021; inactive 2018-2021)

== Specifications ==
- Studio: Metal Blade
- Aspect ratio: 4:3 Fullscreen
- Format: Best of, Box set, Color, DVD-Video, NTSC
- Audio language: English

== Certifications ==
Region	Certification	Certified units/sales
Canada (Music Canada)	Platinum	10,000^{^}
^{^} Shipments figures based on certification alone.
