= 15 Year Killing Spree =

Box set by Cannibal Corpse
- Released: November 4, 2003
- Recorded: 1989–2002
- Genre: Death metal
- Label: Metal Blade

Cannibal Corpse chronology
Worm Infested (2003)	15 Year Killing Spree (2003)	The Wretched Spawn (2004)

Professional ratings
Review scores
Source	Rating
Allmusic	4/5 stars

15 Year Killing Spree is a box set by American death metal band Cannibal Corpse.

== Overview ==
The first disc of the boxed set contains songs from the Chris Barnes era, while the second disc includes songs sung by his replacement George "Corpsegrinder" Fisher. The third disc is a collection of rarities, including the band's 1989 demo Cannibal Corpse and 1995's Created to Kill (an EP of demo tracks for their fifth album Vile with Barnes on vocals) in their entirety, as well as demo tracks for their 1998 album Gallery of Suicide and three song covers.

In addition to the three CDs and DVD which are listed below, this boxed set also contains a poster of the band. Two thousand of the posters that were shipped with the boxed set were autographed by the band. The boxed set also contains a booklet with history and commentary by the band members as well as pictures from the band's history.

15 Year Killing Spree also contains a comic book depicting the story behind one of Cannibal Corpse's most famous songs "Unleashing The Bloodthirsty" from their album Bloodthirst.

== Artwork ==
The cover art contains demons and skeletons placed in windows in a castle surrounded by a moat of blood. Observant Cannibal Corpse fans will notice that the cover art, drawn by the usual artist Vincent Locke, draws from the themes and features characters from previous Cannibal Corpse albums.

== Track listing ==
Disc one (with Chris Barnes)
No.	Title	Writer(s)	Length
1.	"Shredded Humans"	Chris Barnes; Paul Mazurkiewicz; Jack Owen; Bob Rusay; Alex Webster	5:11
2.	"Put Them to Death"	Barnes; Mazurkiewicz; Owen; Rusay; Webster	1:48
3.	"Born in a Casket"	Barnes; Mazurkiewicz; Owen; Rusay; Webster	3:19
4.	"A Skull Full of Maggots"	Barnes; Mazurkiewicz; Owen; Rusay; Webster	2:06
5.	"Gutted"	Barnes; Mazurkiewicz; Owen; Rusay; Webster	3:15
6.	"Covered with Sores"	Barnes; Mazurkiewicz; Owen; Rusay; Webster	3:17
7.	"Vomit the Soul"	Barnes; Mazurkiewicz; Owen; Rusay; Webster	4:30
8.	"Hammer Smashed Face"	Barnes; Mazurkiewicz; Owen; Rusay; Webster	4:04
9.	"Addicted to Vaginal Skin"	Barnes; Mazurkiewicz; Owen; Rusay; Webster	3:32
10.	"The Cryptic Stench"	Barnes; Mazurkiewicz; Owen; Rusay; Webster	3:58
11.	"Staring Through the Eyes of the Dead"	Barnes; Owen; Webster	3:30
12.	"Stripped, Raped and Strangled"	Barnes; Rob Barrett; Owen; Webster	3:27
13.	"The Pick-Axe Murders"	Barnes; Webster	3:03
14.	"The Bleeding"	Barnes; Owen	4:20
15.	"Zero the Hero" (Black Sabbath cover)	Geezer Butler; Ian Gillan; Tony Iommi; Bill Ward	6:35

Disc two (with George "Corpsegrinder" Fisher)
No.	Title	Writer(s)	Length
1.	"Devoured by Vermin"	Barrett; Webster	3:12
2.	"Disfigured"	George Fisher; Webster	3:49
3.	"Monolith"	Mazurkiewicz; Webster	4:25
4.	"I Will Kill You"	Webster	2:48
5.	"Sentenced to Burn"	Webster	3:07
6.	"Gallery of Suicide"	Mazurkiewicz; Owen; Webster	3:56
7.	"Dead Human Collection"	Mazurkiewicz; O'Brien	2:30
8.	"The Spine Splitter"	Mazurkiewicz; Owen	3:10
9.	"Pounded into Dust"	Webster	2:17
10.	"I Cum Blood" (live)	Barnes; Mazurkiewicz; Owen; Rusay; Webster	4:06
11.	"Fucked with a Knife" (live)	Barnes; Webster	2:27
12.	"Unleashing the Bloodthirsty" (live)	Webster	4:15
13.	"Meathook Sodomy" (live)	Barnes; Mazurkiewicz; Owen; Rusay; Webster	5:16
14.	"Savage Butchery"	Owen; Webster	1:51
15.	"Pit of Zombies"	Webster	3:59
16.	"Sanded Faceless"	Mazurkiewicz; O'Brien	3:52
17.	"Systematic Elimination"	Mazurkiewicz; O'Brien	2:52

Disc three (previously unreleased)
No.	Title	Writer(s)	Length
1.	"A Skull Full of Maggots" (1989 demo)	Barnes; Mazurkiewicz; Owen; Rusay; Webster	2:25
2.	"The Undead Will Feast" (1989 demo)	Barnes; Mazurkiewicz; Owen; Rusay; Webster	3:01
3.	"Scattered Remains, Splattered Brains" (1989 demo)	Barnes; Mazurkiewicz; Owen; Rusay; Webster	2:41
4.	"Put Them to Death" (1989 demo)	Barnes; Mazurkiewicz; Owen; Rusay; Webster	1:53
5.	"Bloody Chunks" (1989 demo)	Barnes; Mazurkiewicz; Owen; Rusay; Webster	2:26
6.	"Unburied Horror" (Created to Kill)	Barnes; Webster	3:28
7.	"Mummified in Barbed Wire" (Created to Kill)	Barnes; Webster	3:07
8.	"Gallery of the Obscene" (Created to Kill)	Barnes; Webster	3:37
9.	"To Kill Myself" (Created to Kill)	Barnes; Owen	3:41
10.	"Bloodlands" (Created to Kill)	Barnes; Webster	4:29
11.	"Puncture Wound Massacre" (Created to Kill)	Barnes; Webster	1:43
12.	"Devoured by Vermin" (Created to Kill)	Barnes; Barrett; Webster	3:11
13.	"Chambers of Blood" (Gallery of Suicide demo)	Webster	4:10
14.	"Dismembered and Molested" (Gallery of Suicide demo)	Owen; Webster	1:57
15.	"Gallery of Suicide" (Gallery of Suicide demo)	Mazurkiewicz; Webster	3:58
16.	"Unite the Dead" (Gallery of Suicide demo)	Owen; Webster	3:04
17.	"Crushing the Despised" (Gallery of Suicide demo)	Owen; Webster	1:50
18.	"Headless" (Gallery of Suicide demo)	Mazurkiewicz; Webster	2:26
19.	"Bethany Home (A Place to Die)" (The Accüsed cover)	Dana Collins; Blaine Cook; Tommy Niemeyer; Alex Sibbald	3:19
20.	"Endless Pain" (Kreator cover)	Roberto Fioretti; Mille Petrozza; Jürgen Reil	3:10
21.	"Behind Bars" (Razor cover)	Dave Carlo	2:19

Disc four (DVD)

=== First live Cannibal Corpse show 1989 ===
1. "Scattered Remains, Splattered Brains"
2. "The Undead Will Feast"
3. "Escape the Torment" (Was never recorded)
4. "Bloody Chunks"
5. "Enter at Your Own Risk" (Was never recorded)
6. "Put Them to Death"
7. "A Skull Full of Maggots"

=== "Butchered at Birth" studio footage 1991 ===
1. "Drum sessions for the track 'Covered With Sores' and bass guitar overdub for the track 'Innards Decay'"

=== "Cannibal Corpse Eats Moscow Alive" 1993 ===
1. "Shredded Humans"
2. "The Cryptic Stench"
3. "Meathook Sodomy"
4. "Edible Autopsy"
5. "I Cum Blood"
6. "Gutted"
7. "Entrails Ripped from a Virgin's Cunt"
8. "Beyond the Cemetery"
9. "A Skull Full of Maggots"

=== Live at Avalon Hollywood, Hollywood, CA 04.12.2002 (Metal Blade 20th Anniversary Party) ===
1. "From Skin to Liquid"
2. "Savage Butchery"
3. "Devoured by Vermin"
4. "Stripped, Raped and Strangled"
5. "Disposal of the Body"
6. "Pounded Into Dust"
7. "Addicted to Vaginal Skin"
8. "Meat Hook Sodomy"
9. "Pit of Zombies"
10. "Hammer Smashed Face"
