= Horrified =

Studio album by Repulsion
- Released: July 10, 1989 (Note: Horrified was originally released as a demo titled Slaughter of the Innocent (1986).)
- Recorded: June 1986
- Studio: Larry Hennessy's basement studio (Flint, Michigan)
- Genres: Grindcore; death metal
- Length: 29:04
- Labels: Necrosis; Earache
- Producers: Doug Earp; Repulsion

Repulsion chronology
Horrified (1989)	Excruciation (1991)

Horrified is the only studio album by American grindcore band Repulsion. The album was recorded for US$300 at the basement studio of engineer Larry Hennessy over the course of three to four days in June 1986. Horrified features fast songs combining elements of thrash metal, death metal and hardcore punk; blast beats, and bloody, gory lyrics inspired by horror films and comics. The album was initially released as a demo titled Slaughter of the Innocent, but failed to attract record label interest, resulting in Repulsion's disbandment in September 1986.

After circulating in tape trading circles, Horrified was given an official release with its present title and adjusted artwork through Necrosis Records, a sublabel of Earache Records owned by Bill Steer and Jeff Walker of Carcass, in July 1989. The album is widely considered a classic and highly influential grindcore album and has been credited with pioneering the goregrind subgenre; retrospective reviews acknowledge its influence whilst also describing it as an enjoyable listen. In 2009, Decibel ranked Horrified as the greatest grindcore album of all time, with Terrorizer ranking it as the second-greatest American grindcore album.

== Background ==
In 1984, Matt Olivo and Scott Carlson formed the band Tempter in Flint, Michigan. In the fall of 1984, they briefly renamed themselves Ultraviolence before settling on Genocide. The band recorded its first demo, known as Armies of the Dead, in November 1984. In the spring of 1985, following a period of lineup instabilities, Carlson and Olivo agreed to disband and merge Genocide with Chuck Schuldiner's Death. In August 1985, only weeks after they arrived in Altamonte Springs, Florida, drummer Kam Lee left Death. Unable to find a new drummer, the band attempted to work on new material. Carlson and Olivo found themselves at creative odds with Schuldiner; Carlson said that the latter wanted to take things in a more technical and guitar-oriented direction, while he and Olivo wanted to "completely thrash out". After returning to Flint, Carlson and Olivo reformed Genocide and recruited drummer Dave "Grave" Hollingshead, a punk rock drummer whom they heard about from a newspaper article about a grave robbery. Hollingshead's musical background in funk and new wave differed from those of his bandmates, who were primarily into heavy metal.

In October 1985, Genocide recorded the Violent Death demo and began playing local shows around Flint. Hollingshead initially struggled to play to the speeds Genocide wanted, leading him to play what they described as a "cheating beat"—"hitting the hi-hat every other time he was not hitting the snare". Within a few months, his drumming speed rapidly increased; Carlson said the lyrics of "The Stench of Burning Death", "Six Feet Under", and "The Lurking Fear", which were meant to be played at a slower, Slayer-esque speed, became "garbled". In January 1986, Genocide recorded The Stench of Burning Death demo at WFBE Studios with the help of guitarist Aaron Freeman, who was made a permanent member thereafter. The band attempted to shop the demo to various record labels, who responded with indifference and viewed the band as too extreme and uncommercial. According to Carlson, the demo was rejected by Combat, Metal Blade, and New Renaissance Records. In May 1986, Genocide changed their name to Repulsion, after the Roman Polanski film of the same name, due to the existence of several other bands under their former name.

== Development ==
Olivo said that 75–80% of the songs on Horrified were written while Repulsion was known as Genocide. All but eight of the album's songs are taken from the band's previous demos, and most were completed before Freeman joined the band. The intro of "The Stench of Burning Death" was taken from the chorus of an old Repulsion song titled "Crack of Doom". "Six Feet Under", "Decomposed", and "The Lurking Fear" were written during Carlson and Olivo's time with Schuldiner and Death in Florida. Carlson and Olivo were primarily responsible for the album's writing, either through the former bringing in a complete song that the latter would contribute to or both of them combining their ideas in equal measure. Freeman contributed to the writing of "Eaten Alive", "Acid Bath", "Crematorium", and "Splattered Cadavers". Carlson later described his and Olivo's organization style as a "dictatorship" that he believed was not enjoyable for Hollingshead. Although he said Repulsion "kind of ended up using [him] as a drum machine", Olivo felt Hollingshead brought in his own influences, such as with his use of downbeats when playing blast beats. Freeman highlighted Hollingshead's use of swing beats on "Slaughter of the Innocent" and "Bodily Dismemberment" as representing his experience in hardcore and funk bands.

In June 1986, Repulsion recorded Horrified, then known as Slaughter of the Innocent, at the basement studio of engineer Larry Hennessy. According to Freeman, the album was recorded in three to four days, with two days spent on drums and another two days on guitars and vocals. Carlson said the recording marked the first time Repulsion's members had to be isolated from one another, which "threw everybody off" and made the band less "tight" than they had been during rehearsals. Repulsion self-funded the album's recording due to the lack of label interest. Doug Earp, the owner of a local record store called Wyatt Earp, paid the recording costs of US$300; the band did not pay him back until the album was released. Carlson said that Repulsion had intended to release Slaughter of the Innocent as an album rather than a demo, either through their own or an established label, but were unhappy with Hennessy's recording.

Hollingshead recorded his parts in the studio's utility room with a Tama Rockstar drum kit. Olivo tracked his parts in the control room with a Vantage Flying V; Freeman also used a Gibson Flying V. Situated in a room between Hollingshead and Olivo, Carlson recorded his parts—intended as scratch tracks—with a Squier P Bass into a Boss distortion pedal connected to a DI box at the recording console, so Hollingshead could hear them while recording drums. He described the resulting sound—which William York of AllMusic called "an unholy mess of distorted sludge"—as a "happy accident". The guitars and bass tracks were re-recorded thereafter. According to Carlson, the re-recorded bass tracks were lost when Hennessy "blew over" them during the recording of guitar solo overdubs, resulting in his scratch tracks being used on the final album. (Note: Carlson's bass tracks on Horrified differ from those on the Slaughter of the Innocent demo.) Prior to recording, Carlson caught strep throat but continued to practice vocals and "didn't let [his] voice heal properly", resulting in it permanently moving to a higher register after the studio sessions.

== Composition and lyrics ==
Horrified consists of 18 songs with a running time of just under 30 minutes, with its tracks averaging around one to two minutes in length. Carlson cited Discharge as an influence on the album's length, stating that the band "needed 30 minutes, we figured—we were really into punk bands—and Discharge albums were about 30 minutes long, so we figured '18 songs'." Musically, the album has been described as both grindcore and death metal. Revolver's Eli Enis viewed the album as a "missing link between mid-Eighties American thrash and early English grindcore", while Alex DiStefano of the Phoenix New Times described it as a "hybrid" of death metal and hardcore punk. Backed by raw production, the album's songs are fast-paced and show few signs of groove and melody. They feature thrash metal riffs and blast beats, as well as "noisy whammy-bar-eruption solos" reminiscent of Slayer. Carlson's distorted bass was influenced by Motörhead, Discharge, and Venom. At the time of Horrified's recording, Hollingshead said he was listening to "death metal, anything fast—Slayer, Metallica, Sodom, [Corrosion of Conformity], D.R.I., GBH, [and] Black Flag." Alexander Santelt of Metal.de described the album's drumming as "chaotic, yet extremely driving".

J. Bennett of Terrorizer described the lyrics of Horrified as "blood soaked". DiStefano said that they tell stories of "cannibalism, rancid corpses, zombies, blood, gore, the horrors of war, and the apocalypse." Santelt writes that while the lyrics are primarily focused on "gore horror", songs such as "Slaughter of the Innocent" show elements of "socially critical hardcore". In a 2012 interview with BrooklynVegan, Carlson said that his lyrics were "a product of [his] surroundings", with some songs "conveying real fears and emotion while others are just pure exploitative fun." He drew influence from splatter films such as Dawn of the Dead and Evil Dead, horror comics like Tales from the Crypt and Twisted Tales, and the bands Crucifix and Discharge. He credited the latter with influencing the lyrics of "The Stench of Burning Death", "Slaughter of the Innocent", and "Pestilent Decay". Carlson's vocals, influenced by Cronos and Jeff Becera, were called "brutal" by Distefano and likened to a guttural, "zombie-fied version" of Slayer's Tom Araya by Enis. York called them a "mid-range sneer" that would differ from the "exaggerated Cookie Monster style of much later grindcore".

"Slaughter of the Innocent" is about the end of the world and was musically written by Carlson and Olivo with Discharge and Celtic Frost in mind. According to Carlson, "Decomposed" is the "ballad of a flesh-eating zombie". Selected as one of the album's highlights by York, "Radiation Sickness" was described by Joe DiVita of Loudwire as "a frenzied attack of clanging cymbal bashing and gnashing guitars". Decibel's Gregg Pratt described "Splattered Cadavers" as "speedgrindmayhem". The lyrics of "Festering Boils" were taken—largely unaltered—from a "rough draft" written by Carlson's friend Jim Mark. "Crematorium" was the last song written for Horrified, being completed days before recording commenced. The song's lyrics were written by Carlson, Freeman, and Dejecta vocalist Lee Williams, the latter of whom Carlson later called its "main songwriter". "Driven to Insanity" was inspired by Re-Animator and features a "victorious", galloping punk riff. "The Lurking Fear" was titled after the short story of the same name by H.P. Lovecraft, although its lyrics "have nothing to do with it", according to Carlson. "Black Breath" was inspired by the Nazgûls of J.R.R. Tolkien's The Lord of the Rings series and is the only song on Horrified to not feature a blast beat. Carlson wrote the lyrics of "Maggots in Your Coffin" after its title was suggested by Tom Puro, a friend of Repulsion.

== Release ==
Repulsion hoped the Slaughter of the Innocent demo would garner them label attention, and its subsequent failure to do so left them feeling confused and disillusioned. In July 1986, Hollingshead left Repulsion to join the Army, which Carlson attributed to him and Olivo constantly pushing him to play faster. The band recruited Tom Puro as a replacement drummer that month. By this point, Carlson felt that Repulsion had said all that they needed to with Horrified and were creatively burnt out. The band subsequently disbanded following one final performance in September 1986. At Earp's request, the Horrified lineup would reunite twice thereafter to perform at the Fallout Shelter in Flint on November 7, 1987, and January 1, 1988. In a 2016 interview with Echoes and Dust, Carlson said that Hollingshead's departure and the birth of Freeman's son shortly after the recording of Horrified resulted in "a transitional period [that] we just never recovered from", and believed at the time that the album "would just be forgotten forever" after record labels showed no immediate interest in Repulsion.

In the intervening years, Slaughter of the Innocent garnered a following in tape-trading circles from bands including Napalm Death and Carcass and "aspiring extremists" such as Nickie Andersson, Lee Dorrian, and Fenriz of Darkthrone. At the urging of Napalm Death bassist Shane Embury, who was pen pals with Freeman, Digby Pearson of Earache Records contacted Repulsion in early 1989 with an offer to release their album. Carlson said that, ironically, Earache was one of the few labels Repulsion did not send their demo to, as they had only put out two releases at the time—a reissue of The Accüsed's debut album and a flexi release by Heresy. With some funding from Pearson, Slaughter of the Innocent was remixed in March 1989 at Silver Tortoise Soundlab in Ann Arbor, Michigan, by Carlson, Freeman, and Jonas Berzanskis. Hennessy was supposed to work on the mix, but Repulsion could not contact him when it was time to do so.

Around this time, Jeff Walker and Bill Steer of Carcass expressed interest in signing Repulsion to a record label they wanted to form to exploit the Enterprise Allowance Scheme. Walker said that Pearson was afraid that—like Heresy had done in the past—Carcass was attempting to secede from Earache. Ultimately, Walker and Steer agreed to release Repulsion's album through their own Earache sublabel, Necrosis Records. Prior to its release, Carlson changed the name from Slaughter of the Innocent to Horrified, which he considered a better fit for its cover artwork. The album was released through Necrosis and Earache on July 10, 1989.

== Artwork ==
The cover of Horrified, illustrated by Carlson in the style of EC Comics, was inspired by a story in Twisted Tales about a "burned up kid who comes back from the dead on Halloween and goes trick-or-treating." Mike Grossklaus, who worked on its layout, initially drew the album's cover, which Carlson described as a "sort of psychedelic blur of a photo of a guy getting his head blown off". Earache rejected Grossklaus' cover, and Walker ended up handling the artwork uncredited. According to Carlson, Walker enlarged and painted over his illustration to depict a "rotten, green zombie", unaware of its intended representation of a "burned up kid". Phil Skarich, whom Carlson knew from a band he was in called From Beyond, drew the liner notes artwork.

Olivo, who was stationed in Germany with the Army at the time of its release, recalled that his first thought upon receiving a copy of the album was "'Goddamn, this is shitty looking!' [...] that cover is just fucking awful", although he was happy with the rest of its packaging. In a 2004 interview, Carlson criticized the cover for deviating from its intended idea and said it was "terrible and we're stuck with it cos that's what people have seen." Conversely, Freeman considered the cover to be the "better choice" in hindsight, calling it Repulsion's version of Eddie. Bennett described the cover as "iconic".

== Reception and legacy ==
Professional ratings
Review scores
Source	Rating
AllMusic	4/5 stars
Metal.de	10/10
Metal Forces	90/100
Metal Hammer	4/5

Over time, Horrified came to be seen as a landmark grindcore release, and is widely regarded by as a classic and highly influential album by the genre's fans; according to Justin M. Norton of About.com, "many consider [it] the most influential grindcore album ever". In 2009, Decibel's Andrew Bonzanelli ranked Horrified first on the magazine's list of "The Top 30 Grindcore Albums of All Time", calling it the genre's "first, and definitive" album and crediting it with "legitimizing the blast beat by employing it in bulk". Terrorizer ranked it as the second-greatest American grindcore album, stating that Repulsion was "directly and indirectly responsible for [the existence of] every other band" on their list. Horrified has also been credited with pioneering the goregrind subgenre, with Greg Pratt of Decibel describing it as the source of inspiration for "every goregrind band on the planet".

Embury and Mitch Harris both cited Horrified as a massive influence on Napalm Death, who also covered "Maggots in Your Coffin" on their 1999 covers EP Leaders Not Followers. Entombed recorded a cover of "Black Breath" for a 7" single in 1994. Anders Björler of At the Gates credited his experience listening to Horrified at the house of bandmate Tomas Lindberg with exposing him to grindcore and death metal. Brutal Truth bassist Dan Lilker said he was surprised at the speed of Repulsion when he first heard the album in demo form in the mid-1980s; vocalist Kevin Sharp considered Carlson's bass tone to be genre-defining for grindcore, comparing it to the influence of the Ramones' "riffing" on punk music and Dave Lombardo's "Reign in Blood beat" on thrash metal. Soilwork drummer Dirk Verbeuren expressed admiration for the album, which he considered a "grindcore milestone". Mortiis cited the album as an influence. Critics have also described Horrified as laying the groundwork for other bands including Cannibal Corpse, Death, and Pestilence.

Reviewing the album for Metal Hammer in 1993, James Sherry acknowledged Horrified's influence on bands such as Napalm Death and Carcass whilst describing it as a fun listen that was "as chaotic, dangerous and downright repulsive as music can get... for now." In his retrospective review for AllMusic, (Note: Although his review is undated, York states he is listening to Horrified almost 20 years after its recording in 1986.) York said that the album could still be enjoyed as a "direct blast of youthful, horror-inspired thrash/grind mayhem" without having to consider its impact or legacy. Kerrang! stated in 2019 that Horrified's "agitated pace is also what gives [the album] its charm, and for a generation of kids uninterested in a lot of extreme metal's technical obsession, the record became influential beyond anyone's wildest dreams." In 2021, Alexander Santelt of Metal.de wrote that the album "remains absolutely relevant today, both as a historical audio document and the birth of [grindcore], but also as a still incredibly entertaining, [...] primitively antisocial, yet charming and catchy blast."

== Aftermath ==
Repulsion reunited in 1990 and produced two demos and an extended play, Excrutiation (1991), through Relapse Records. The EP's success led Relapse to re-release Horrified in 1992, with new artwork and the bonus track "Black Nightmare", taken from Repulsion's Stench of Burning Death demo. In a 2004 interview, Carlson and Freeman said that the album had sold 6,000 copies through Earache and another 5,000 through Relapse. The band disbanded at the end of 1992, due to Carlson losing interest and moving out of Flint.

On February 4, 2003, Relapse reissued Horrified again with a bonus CD consisting of various demos and other recordings titled Rarities, bringing renewed attention to Repulsion. Shortly thereafter, Repulsion were then offered a headlining slot at the final Milwaukee Metalfest, leading to their reunion; the band has continued to tour and perform, primarily at festivals, since then. In 2009, Repulsion performed the album in its entirety in New York City with Pig Destroyer and Brutal Truth. The band initially reformed with its Horrified line-up; by 2013, Carlson remained its sole constant member.

To date, Horrified remains Repulsion's sole album. When asked about the possibility of recording new material in a 2012 interview with BrooklynVegan, Carlson said that if "the material and motivation ever come together, I think [Repulsion] could do something that would not tarnish our name". In the 2016 edition of Choosing Death: The Improbable History of Death Metal and Grindcore, he said that new material would have to come naturally instead of forcing it, but otherwise believed audiences would not be interested in it.

== Track listing ==
All tracks are written by Repulsion.

Standard release
No.	Title	Length
1.	"The Stench of Burning Death"	1:33
2.	"Eaten Alive"	1:38
3.	"Acid Bath"	1:30
4.	"Slaughter of the Innocent"	1:32
5.	"Decomposed"	1:21
6.	"Radiation Sickness"	2:04
7.	"Splattered Cadavers"	1:24
8.	"Festering Boils"	1:52
9.	"Pestilent Decay"	1:03
10.	"Crematorium"	1:29
11.	"Driven to Insanity"	1:39
12.	"Six Feet Under"	1:11
13.	"Bodily Dismemberment"	1:45
14.	"Repulsion"	1:44
15.	"The Lurking Fear"	1:09
16.	"Black Breath"	2:16
17.	"Maggots in Your Coffin"	1:45
18.	"Horrified"	2:04
Total length:		29:04

1992 reissue bonus track
No.	Title	Original album	Length
19.	"Black Nightmare"	Genocide WFBE Demo 1/26/86 (a.k.a. The Stench of Burning Death)	2:07
Total length:			31:11

2003 reissue Disc 2: Rarities
No.	Title	Original album	Length
1.	"Armies of the Dead"	Genocide 11/84 Rehearsal Demo (a.k.a. Armies of the Dead)	2:24
2.	"Satan's Whores"	Genocide 11/84 Rehearsal Demo (a.k.a. Armies of the Dead)	2:36
3.	"Crack of Doom"	Genocide 11/84 Rehearsal Demo (a.k.a. Armies of the Dead)	2:30
4.	"Armies of the Dead"	Genocide Violent Death Demo Autumn '85	1:43
5.	"Six Feet Under"	Genocide Violent Death Demo Autumn '85	1:33
6.	"Violent Death"	Genocide Violent Death Demo Autumn '85	1:05
7.	"The Lurking Fear"	Genocide Violent Death Demo Autumn '85	1:34
8.	"Crack of Doom"	Genocide Violent Death Demo Autumn '85	2:00
9.	"Horrified"	Genocide Violent Death Demo Autumn '85	2:32
10.	"The Stench of Burning Death"	Genocide WFBE Demo 1/26/86 (a.k.a. The Stench of Burning Death)	1:30
11.	"Decomposed"	Genocide WFBE Demo 1/26/86 (a.k.a. The Stench of Burning Death)	1:34
12.	"Slaughter of the Innocent"	Genocide WFBE Demo 1/26/86 (a.k.a. The Stench of Burning Death)	1:50
13.	"Eaten Alive"	Genocide WFBE Demo 1/26/86 (a.k.a. The Stench of Burning Death)	1:50
14.	"Six Feet Under"	Genocide WFBE Demo 1/26/86 (a.k.a. The Stench of Burning Death)	1:19
15.	"Crypt of Terror"	Genocide WFBE Demo 1/26/86 (a.k.a. The Stench of Burning Death)	1:48
16.	"The Lurking Fear"	Genocide WFBE Demo 1/26/86 (a.k.a. The Stench of Burning Death)	1:19
17.	"Festering Boils"	Genocide WFBE Demo 1/26/86 (a.k.a. The Stench of Burning Death)	1:56
18.	"Pestilent Decay"	Genocide WFBE Demo 1/26/86 (a.k.a. The Stench of Burning Death)	1:14
19.	"Black Nightmare"	Genocide WFBE Demo 1/26/86 (a.k.a. The Stench of Burning Death)	2:03
20.	"Bodily Dismemberment"	Genocide WFBE Demo 1/26/86 (a.k.a. The Stench of Burning Death)	1:55
21.	"Horrified"	Genocide WFBE Demo 1/26/86 (a.k.a. The Stench of Burning Death)	2:14
22.	"Radiation Sickness"	Genocide Live 5/14/86	2:06
23.	"Black Breath"	Genocide Live 5/14/86	2:17
24.	"Excrutiation"	Repulsion Excrutiation EP/Demo	3:31
25.	"Helga (Lost Her Head)"	Repulsion Excrutiation EP/Demo	3:25
26.	"Rebirth"	Repulsion Excrutiation EP/Demo	3:06
27.	"House of Freaks"	Repulsion Excrutiation EP/Demo	2:42
28.	"Depraved"	Repulsion 1991 Final Demos	2:59
29.	"Face of Decay"	Repulsion 1991 Final Demos	3:15
30.	"Something Dead"	Repulsion 1991 Final Demos	3:31
Total length:			65:25

== Personnel ==
Personnel adapted from liner notes.

Repulsion
- Aaron Freeman - guitar, mixing
- Matt Olivo - guitar
- Scott Carlson - bass, vocals, mixing
- Dave Hollingshead - drums
Production
- Doug Earp - production
- Repulsion - production
- Larry Hennessy - recording, engineering
- Jonas Berzanskis - mixing

Artwork

- Scott Carlson - cover illustration
- Jeff Walker - artwork (uncredited)
- Phil Skarich - inner artwork
- Mike Grossklaus - layout

== Bibliography ==
- Badin, Oliver (February 2009). "Goregrind". Terrorizer. No. 180. Dark Arts Ltd. p. 41. ISSN 1350-6978.
- Bennett, J. (April 2013). "Slaves to the Grind". Terrorizer. No. 234. Dark Arts Ltd. pp. 28–29. ISSN 1350-6978.
- Bonazelli, Andrew (March 2009). "The Top 30 Grindcore Albums of All Time". Decibel. No. 53. Red Flag Media, Inc. pp. 64–67. ISSN 1557-2137.
- Carlson, Scott (2003). Repulsion: Horrified (booklet). Relapse Records. pp. 4–7, 10–15. RR 6563-2.
- Cras, Gunter (2002). "Repulsion: Back From the Grave" (PDF). Slayer. No. 17. p. 35. Archived (PDF) from the original on October 18, 2025.
- Meacham, Anna; Stewart-Panko, Kevin; Hoare, James; Horsely, Jonathan (March 2009). "Criminal Records". Terrorizer. No. 181. Dark Arts Ltd. pp. 44–45. ISSN 1350-6978.
- Mudrian, Albert (2004). Choosing Death : The Improbable History of Death Metal & Grindcore (1st ed.). US: Feral House. ISBN 1-932595-04-X.
- Mudrian, Albert (2016). Choosing Death: The Improbable History of Death Metal & Grindcore (Revised and Expanded Edition) (2nd paperback ed.). US: Bazillion Points. ISBN 978-1-935950-16-5.
- Ramadier, Laurent (January 10, 2002). Repulsion: Horrified (booklet). Relapse Records. pp. 2–3. RR 6563-2.
- Sherry, James (January 1993). "Reviews". Metal Hammer. Vol. 8, no. 1. UK: Rock Team Publishing. p. 34. ISSN 0955-1190.
- Widener, Matthew (August 2008). "Scared to Death: The Making of Repulsion's Horrified". In Mudrian, Albert (ed.). Precious Metal: Decibel Presents the Stories Behind 25 Extreme Metal Masterpieces. Da Capo Press. pp. 73–84. ISBN 9780786749621.
- Williams, Carl (September 1989). "Albums". Metal Forces. No. 42. Force10 Publications. p. 34. OCLC 859210254.
