= Napalm Death: Thrash to Death =

- Genre: Documentary
- Directed by: Hellen Gallacher
- Starring: Bill Steer; Mick Harris; Lee Dorrian; Shane Embury
- Country of origin: United Kingdom
- Original language: English

Production
- Producers: Hellen Gallacher; Janice Clift
- Production locations: Birmingham, UK; London, UK
- Camera setup: John Adderley; Rob Pascal; Colin Waldeck; Mike Shelton; Ian Stone
- Running time: approx. 13 min.

Original release
- Network: BBC
- Release: 1989

Napalm Death: Thrash to Death is a short heavy metal music documentary aired on British channel BBC. Thrash to Death centers around grindcore pioneers Napalm Death. An interview with its four members is conducted at their hometown (Birmingham, UK), interspersed with footage from their live show at the ULU, also featured on Arena's "Heavy Metal" documentary.

The setlist of Napalm Death's ULU performance is focused on songs of their Scum (1987) and From Enslavement to Obliteration (1988) albums. Half of the songs have a slightly shorter length than their original studio counterparts. Also, they pay an impromptu homage to one of their early influences, Flint, Michigan band Repulsion, playing the first bars of "The Stench of Burning Death" as an intro to one of their songs, "Deceiver".

== Background ==
The concert footage was filmed for Heavy Metal, an edition of the BBC arts series Arena broadcast in April 1989. It was first shown on BBC Two as part of the channel's Heavy Metal Heaven night, presented by Elvira, alongside live clips of bands including Motörhead, Iron Maiden, Black Sabbath, Metallica and Megadeth. Towards the end of the programme, the four members of Napalm Death were interviewed sitting on a bed in a suburban room covered in horror film posters; bassist Shane Embury described the band's sound as "distorted bass, fast drumming and over-the-top vocals", before the film cut to the band performing "Scum".

Highlights of the set were later rebroadcast as Thrashed to Death, according to Earache Records founder Digby Pearson, and footage of "Scum" and "You Suffer" from the Arena documentary was included as bonus material on the band's 2001 Earache release The DVD.

Pearson recalled in a 2009 post on the label's Ask Earache blog:

I spent the entire gig stood next to the BBC's back cameraman and a gaggle of A-lister journalists because I had to cite the name of each song during the set, so the tapes were properly labelled and reviews were correct. It was annoying at the time because this gig was the bands biggest crowd ever, it was a defining moment and was basically a culmination of the grindcore scene's unbeleivable explosion into the Uk public's consciousness.It went from Peel to NME to BBC in 12 unreal months. The BBC is a remarkable broadcaster in that its funded by UK licence payers, which frees it up from purely commercial concerns- also part of its remit is to actively broadcast, promote and expose new UK music. Napalm Death were the hot new band at the time, plus thrash metal fans were unavoidable on the street - so what began as a documentary covering the Thrash scene became way more focused on Napalm Death, simply because the director of the documentary Helen Gallacher took a real shine to the youthful band. She was the reason that they got more screentime than say Black Sabbath. Remember also back then this was before Sky Tv, the hundreds of Digital channels didn't exist- the nation had a choice of just 4 channels to watch every night.The Arena show is highly influential, it legitmised the band as culturally relevant in the UK. The morning after it was broadcast, even taxi drivers knew what Napalm Death were all about.

== Plot summary ==
Guitarist Bill Steer then explains the musical characteristics of death metal:

It always follows minor scales rather than major scales. It is just a traditional rock thing to go from E to A to D and all of these happy-sounding chord progressions; Slayer and early bands like Sabbath and Venom, they tried to avoid them.

== Track listing ==
No.	Title	Length
1.	"Scum" (Justin Broadrick, Nicholas Bullen)	2:17
2.	"Cock-Rock Alienation" (Napalm Death)	1:16
3.	"The Kill" (Broadrick, Bullen)	0:23
4.	"Obstinate Direction" (Napalm Death)	0:54
5.	"The Stench of Burning Death (Repulsion) / Deceiver" (Napalm Death)	0:39
6.	"Control" (Broadrick, Bullen)	1:26

Tracks #1, #3, the second half of #5 ("Deceiver") and #6 are taken from Napalm Death's debut, Scum. Tracks #2 and #4 are taken from the album From Enslavement to Obliteration. The first half of track #5 ("The Stench of Burning Death") is taken from Repulsion's 1986 demo tape, Horrified.
