= Choosing Death: The Improbable History of Death Metal & Grindcore =

2004 book by Albert Mudrian

Choosing Death: The Improbable History of Death Metal and Grindcore
- Author: Albert Mudrian
- Cover artist: Dan Seagrave
- Language: English, Italian (2009), German, French, Finnish, Polish, Spanish
- Subject: Death metal and grindcore
- Genre: Music
- Publisher: Bazillion Points
- Publication place: United States
- English publication date: 2016
- Media type: Print
- Pages: 400
- ISBN: 978-1-935950-16-5
- Preceded by: Original version (published in 2004 by Feral House; now out of print)

Choosing Death: The Improbable History of Death Metal & Grindcore is a music history book by Albert Mudrian, the founding editor-in-chief of Decibel, a monthly magazine devoted to heavy metal music. The book was first published in 2004 by Feral House and details the evolution of the death metal and grindcore musical genres, from its beginnings as a small subculture exchanging compact cassettes to a genre where some artists reach million-dollar sales. A limited updated and expanded edition was published in hardcover in 2015 by Decibel Books. A further expanded and revised "death-luxe" edition was published in 2016 by Bazillion Points.

The 2016 edition includes forewords by BBC Radio 1 DJ John Peel and Repulsion founder Scott Carlson. A reviewer for Terrorizer praised Choosing Death as "the most informed and comprehensive document on death metal and grind that you will ever see".

The first Choosing Death Fest was held in Philadelphia, Pennsylvania, on April 16, 2016. The first part of the two-part festival was the Choosing Death Fest Grimposium, which included panel discussions with a variety of death metal experts and enthusiasts, and featured an advance screening of the 2016 documentary Death by Metal. The second part, a concert at Union Transfer, was headlined by Nails, and featured Misery Index, Deceased, Noisem, Horrendous, Derketa, and Taphos Nomos.

== See also ==
- Precious Metal (book)
- Louder Than Hell (book)
- Raising Hell (music history book)
