= Marissa Martinez =

American musician (born 1975)

- Born: July 13, 1975 (age 50)
- Genres: Grindcore; death metal
- Occupations: Musician; Songwriter
- Instruments: Vocals; guitar
- Years active: 1992-present
- Member of: Cretin (band)
- Formerly of: Repulsion

Marissa Martinez-Hoadley (born July 13, 1975) is an American guitarist and singer. She is the frontwoman and guitarist of the grindcore band Cretin.

Martinez publicly came out a trans woman in a July 2008 interview with Decibel.

== Early life ==
When Martinez was five years old, her father died after a night of drunk driving.

== Career ==
Martinez became interested in using extreme vocals at the age of 17. One day, she approached a skateboarding peer of hers who played drums and asked him if he wanted to jam. After the jam, Martinez formed Cretin.

== Personal life ==
Martinez began transitioning in 2007 and publicly came out in 2008. She had an ex-wife who she divorced after coming out, though she has stated that her ex-wife was very supportive of her.

== Discography ==
=== With Cretin ===
- Extreme Cretanic Grindcore (2003)
- Cretanic Grind Ambush (2004)
- Freakery (2006)
- Stranger (2014)
