= Hammer Smashed Face =

EP by Cannibal Corpse
- Released: March 23, 1993
- Recorded: January 1993 – Niagara Falls, New York
- Genre: Death metal
- Length: 26:17
- Label: Metal Blade
- Producers: Dennis Fura; Cannibal Corpse

Cannibal Corpse chronology
Tomb of the Mutilated (1992)	Hammer Smashed Face (1993)	The Bleeding (1994)

Single version
- Cover for the single version of "Hammer Smashed Face", which was originally from the album Tomb of the Mutilated (1992)

Audio
- "Hammer Smashed Face" on YouTube

Hammer Smashed Face is an EP / single by American death metal band Cannibal Corpse, released on March 23, 1993, by Metal Blade Records.

There are two versions of the release, a single version that features the title song "Hammer Smashed Face" with two covers of songs by Black Sabbath and Possessed, and the EP version which includes the three tracks of the single version along with two original Cannibal Corpse tracks.

== Artwork ==
Unlike most releases by the band, the album's artwork was not created by longtime collaborator Vincent Locke. Cannibal Corpse did not approve the album artwork that was used in the final product and do not know the name of the artist who produced it. The single version and the EP version both have different cover artwork.

== Reception ==
When asked if he had a favorite Cannibal Corpse album, singer Chris Barnes described the Hammer Smashed EP as "one of the underrated ones". Barnes also hailed the group's cover of Black Sabbath's "Zero the Hero" as "one of the greatest".

== Track listing ==
EP version
No.	Title	Length
1.	"Hammer Smashed Face"	4:04
2.	"The Exorcist" (Possessed cover)	4:37
3.	"Zero the Hero" (Black Sabbath cover)	6:35
4.	"Meat Hook Sodomy"	5:47
5.	"Shredded Humans"	5:12
Total length:		26:17

Single version
No.	Title	Length
1.	"Hammer Smashed Face"	4:04
2.	"The Exorcist" (Possessed cover)	4:37
3.	"Zero the Hero" (Black Sabbath cover)	6:35
Total length:		15:17

== Personnel ==
Cannibal Corpse

- Chris Barnes – vocals
- Bob Rusay – guitars
- Jack Owen – guitars
- Alex Webster – bass
- Paul Mazurkiewicz – drums

Production

- Scott Burns, Dennis Fura and Cannibal Corpse – production
