= Gigantic Brain =

American music project

- Origin: Virginia, U.S.
- Genres: Cybergrind, industrial, post-metal/rock ambient, experimental
- Years active: 2000–present
- Labels: Razorback, Crucificados Pelo Sistema, Grindcore Karaoke
- Members: John Brown
- Website: giganticbrain.bandcamp.com

Gigantic Brain is an American experimental music project composed of John Brown, formed in the early 2000s in Virginia. Gigantic Brain is known to be one of the original pioneers of the cybergrind subgenre of grindcore. The project's genre-defying style has changed dramatically throughout the years. Originally exhibiting a grindcore style, the group has more recently ventured into post-metal, ambient, industrial and sometimes drone.

== Biography ==
Gigantic Brain began as a one-man drum-machine powered electronic grindcore and post-metal project created by John Brown. It is noted for being vastly different from the majority of electronic grindcore bands, due to the various musical textures and very dense sound, often inspired by dark science fiction and futuristic concepts. In 2012, after a two-year hiatus from the project, Gigantic Brain became a duo with the addition of producer and multi-instrumentalist Mastin Simmons.

In 2003, Gigantic Brain released a split 10" with Umbrella on Crucificados Pelo Sistema. By the end of 2003, Gigantic Brain had recorded material for a split with Gånglîå and a full-length album, which was to be entitled Our Bovine Destroyers. Unfortunately, neither would see their own formal releases, but, in 2004, Gigantic Brain released the massive 63 track The Invasion Discography on Razorback Records, which included, amongst other material, all the tracks that were to be used on those two releases. The album received critical acclaim and was met with praise throughout the grindcore community due to the professionality of the material.

Two digital albums and a digital EP were released in 2009 (World, I Swallow 16 Red Planets, Betelgeuse, respectively), which were a departure from the cybergrind sound, instead consisting of more ambient material and minimalist electronic influences, with some tracks retaining the powerful drive drawn from the project's grindcore roots. In 2010, the album They Did This to Me was released, continuing this mixture of influences.

After a two-year hiatus from the project, Mastin Simmons was brought into the fold and there was the announcement of a new Gigantic Brain album which would feature a "heavily updated" version of their production values and style. At the time, the album was stated to be released sometime in 2013 or early 2014. On November 7, 2013, Gigantic Brain began releasing singles (Our Dam, Brunette) leading up to the release of their upcoming album, each featuring two new songs from that session. On February 19, 2016, much later than originally stated, Gigantic Brain announced the release of their new self-titled album.

At one time, all of the Gigantic Brain releases were available for free download on their MySpace website. In September 2011, the band's back catalog was re-released and is currently available to stream from Grindcore Karaoke.

== Discography ==
Studio albums

- The Invasion Discography CD / Digital Album (Razorback Records, 2004 / Grindcore Karaoke, 2011)
- I Swallow 16 Red Planets Digital Album (2009 / Grindcore Karaoke, 2011)
- World Digital Album (2009 / Grindcore Karaoke, 2011)
- They Did This to Me Digital Album (2010 / Grindcore Karaoke, 2011)
- Self-titled CD / Digital Album (2016)

Singles / EPs

- Umbrella / Gigantic Brain 10" (Crucificados Pelo Sistema, 2003)
- Gånglîå / Gigantic Brain Digital EP (cancelled)
- Betelgeuse Digital EP (2009 / Grindcore Karaoke, 2011)
- Our Dam Digital Single (2013)
- Brunette Digital Single (2013)
