= Staring Through the Eyes of the Dead =

Song by Cannibal Corpse

from the album The Bleeding
- Released: 1994
- Studio: Morrisound Recording
- Genre: Death metal
- Length: 3:30
- Label: Metal Blade Records
- Composer: Cannibal Corpse
- Lyricist: Chris Barnes
- Producer: Scott Burns

"Staring Through the Eyes of the Dead" is a song by American death metal band Cannibal Corpse, released in 1994 as the opening track from their fourth studio album The Bleeding. It is considered one of the band's classic tracks, and is a staple of their live sets.

== Composition and lyrics ==
The song is considered to be more mature and structured than the songs on Tomb of the Mutilated. Greg Pratt of Decibel said the song "established that this album was going to be just as brutal as the band’s first three but that something is different: there’s a bit of breathing room, there’s a touch of maturity (the good kind), there’s a sense of... song. Song? Song!" The song's bridge features a prominent bass guitar groove.

Loudwire said the song is about "being a guy who’s alive but everybody thinks is dead. Like Abe Vigoda!"

== Music video ==
A music video was produced for the song, which was the first in the band's career. The video aired on MTV several times. The video was featured in an episode of Beavis and Butt-Head, where one of the protagonists gives the commentary: "If these guys practiced their instruments as much as they practiced shaking their hair around, they'd be, like, pretty good, probably."
