= Tomb of the Mutilated =

Studio album by Cannibal Corpse
- Released: September 22, 1992
- Recorded: June 1–15, 1992
- Studios: Morrisound Recording, Tampa, Florida
- Genre: Death metal
- Length: 35:11
- Label: Metal Blade
- Producer: Scott Burns

Cannibal Corpse chronology
Butchered at Birth (1991)	Tomb of the Mutilated (1992)	Hammer Smashed Face (1993)

Alternate cover
- Censored version

Tomb of the Mutilated is the third studio album by American death metal band Cannibal Corpse, released on September 22, 1992, by Metal Blade Records.

The album was recorded at Morrisound Recording in Tampa, Florida by Scott Burns. It is the band's final album to feature their original lineup, as founding guitarist Bob Rusay was fired and replaced with Malevolent Creation guitarist Rob Barrett after the album's release. The band has since stated that Rusay did not perform any rhythm guitar tracks on the album at the request of Burns, and that some of the guitar leads he was permitted to record were ultimately re-recorded by Jack Owen.

Tomb of the Mutilated is notorious for its album cover artwork, which depicts a male and a female zombie engaged in cunnilingus. The artwork was created by longtime collaborator Vince Locke. The artwork's original incarnation was reportedly rejected by Metal Blade Records president Brian Slagel because it "wasn't gory enough", which resulted in the final product. A censored version of the cover artwork was also created.

The album's music is considered to be more complex and refined than its predecessors. Most of the tracks follow more linear song structures than on previous releases and repeat riffs in a way that they are considered "hooks" by some publications. Additionally, the album contains what are considered to be some of the band's most extreme lyrics of their career, exploring themes such as necrophilia, mutilation, sadism, child murder, incest, cannibalism, pedophilia and sexual violence. The album's mix, which emphasizes the bass guitar performance of Alex Webster, is also routinely noted in discussions about the album. Original frontman Chris Barnes' vocal performance, which has been characterized as sounding like a "belch", is mostly incomprehensible throughout.

The album contains some of the band's most infamous and widely-known songs. The opening track "Hammer Smashed Face" is considered to be the band's signature song, and is almost always used to close the band's live sets. The track was featured in the 1994 film Ace Ventura: Pet Detective, in which the band also made a cameo appearance. The tracks "I Cum Blood" and "Entrails Ripped from a Virgin's Cunt" are also considered classics.

Tomb of the Mutilated is now considered a landmark in the death metal genre. The album's style and sound have been widely emulated by later acts, and numerous publications have observed its influence within various subgenres of extreme metal since its release.

== Background and writing ==
The album was written in Buffalo, New York. During this time, some or all of the band's members were unemployed and were rehearsing material every day. Guitarist Jack Owen and bassist Alex Webster had a 45-minute commute from the band's practice space, and would carpool to rehearsals. The band members mostly composed the music individually, in contrast to the writing process for Butchered at Birth, which was a largely collaborative effort. Bassist Alex Webster began practicing bass fervently after returning home from touring on Butchered at Birth, and claims that "Hammer Smashed Face" was written as the result of his attempts to improve as a bassist. Chris Barnes said, "He was driven as a musician. I've never met anyone as driven as Alex when it comes to trying to learn an instrument. [...] He was always trying to outdo guys he thought were amazing."

Original guitarist Bob Rusay claims he "hit a wall" and "couldn't get inspired" during the writing process, and therefore did not contribute as many compositions to the album as he had on the band's two prior efforts. He recalled the album cycle as "stressful", and stated that by this point he and the rest of the band were not getting along.

Owen stated that some of the album's tracks took a week to write, and others took up to five. Although songwriting was not credited to individual members as with later Cannibal Corpse releases, according to Owen, Rusay composed much of "Post Mortal Ejaculation" and "Beyond the Cemetery." Owen claims to have written much of "I Cum Blood", "Addicted to Vaginal Skin", "Split Wide Open" and "Necropedophile". He said the music for "Hammer Smashed Face" was composed by Webster and Mazurkiewicz. Webster said Owen contributed one riff to "Hammer Smashed Face". According to Webster, members would write riffs outside of practice and bring them to rehearsal for them to be fleshed out. Mazurkiewicz claims he contributed to the opening riff in "I Cum Blood", which he showed to Owen, who "morphed it a little bit".

== Recording and production ==
Tomb of the Mutilated was recorded at Morrisound Recording studios in Tampa, Florida over a two-week period during February 1992. Tomb was the band's first album in which they had the budget to work longer hours in the studio with producer Scott Burns. Guitarist Jack Owen tracked all of the album's rhythm guitar sections at the request of producer Scott Burns; he had observed that the duo had radically different playing styles, and argued that a tighter sound would result from having the band's strongest rhythm guitar player track all rhythms. Rusay was a self-taught guitarist, whose playing style was described as "unorthodox" by vocalist Chris Barnes. He performed the album's guitar solos, though Burns stated in the Centuries of Torment documentary that Owen ultimately re-recorded many of these parts as well. Owen recalled in the book Precious Metal: "I think it was in the middle of tracking the album, Alex told him I was going to do the rhythm guitars. Next thing you know, Bob was back at the hotel, drinking beers and getting sunburned."

Scott Burns' production is considered to be one of the album's hallmarks, and has been described as a "wall of sound" – Webster has stated that many fans have told him that Tomb is their favorite release by the band based on the mix alone. It was the first release by the band to use the overdubbing production technique, as they did not have the budget to do so prior. According to Chris Dick of Decibel: "On Tomb, [Webster] made the following statement: 'Hey, I'm not a guitarist! I'm a bass player!'" Drummer Paul Mazurkiewicz said: "When you listen to it, he stands out. [...] Tomb of the Mutilated was his stepping-stone. He wanted to be heard." According to Owen, the bass "pokes out" in the album's mix. Mazurkiewicz also said: "We always knew that it was important to us to have the bass shine through. Alex is that kind of a bass player; we always loved the Iron Maiden approach in that way, and that's what we wanted. We always wanted the bass to be heard, more so on Tomb Of The Mutilated than any of the previous records."

Jack Owen recalled: "The main thing I remember was putting the album together—the final touches, seeing the song title 'Entrails Ripped From a Virgin's Cunt' and saying, 'Dudes, we've finally gone too far!' When we got the artwork back, which was a male zombie going down on a female zombie, it's like, 'Oh man! We've really gone too far!'"

Because the liner notes on Butchered at Birth feature quotations from American serial killer Albert Fish, he is often incorrectly credited with being the voice at the beginning of "Addicted to Vaginal Skin". However, the taped confession heard at the beginning of the song belongs to the "Genesee River Killer" Arthur Shawcross. Barnes claimed that he "snuck" the sample onto the album because it "creeped [him] out".

== Music ==
=== Songwriting and style ===
Tomb of the Mutilated has been described as a "balls-out gore metal record" that "adheres [...] stringently to the genre's formula". It has been said to have a "grinding atmosphere." The music on Tomb has been described as "jarring, alien and nearly incomprehensible", and is considered to be markedly faster and more complex than its predecessors. Alex Webster said he became interested in the "technical side of music" after being exposed to the music of Atheist and Cynic while hanging out with Greg St. John of Solstice. Pestilence and Gorguts, who the band had toured with prior, are also said to be influences present on the album.

The album has been noted for its hooks. Webster stated that the album's tracks are more "song-like" in comparison to the tracks on Butchered at Birth, which guitarist Jack Owen described as "just riff after riff." According to Webster: "When you look at some of the records that really inspired us, like Reign in Blood, they're heavy records, but they're conventionally arranged. That was how we approached Tomb. [...] There's still some weird stuff [on the album], like on 'Post-Mortal Ejaculation'. That's pretty far from being a mainstream arrangement." Decibel referred to "Hammer Smashed Face" as the "death metal equivalent" of "Stayin' Alive" by the Bee Gees. Mason Adams of Vice said the album "sounds like death metal as pop—the genre stripped to its basics."

=== Instrumentation and vocals ===
Webster said the band's increasingly technical approach to songwriting made the album's sessions the most challenging they had endured at that point, saying: "I think when you listen to the album, and compare it with the first two, you can hear the progression. [...] It was this technical push and the challenging music it created that made [the album] a fan favorite." Paul Mazurkiewicz stated that although the infamous bassline in "Hammer Smashed Face" was in his view "a little primitive", it was considered technical by the genre's standards in 1992. Loudwire said the album's songs contain "tug-of-war like tempo changes."

Invisible Oranges stated that "there's a deep guttural rhythmic quality to the album not unlike a tribal drum or an excited heartbeat". Many of the album's riffs are chugged. The band tracked the album's guitars using a Marshall Valvestate head running through a Carbon head. Former guitarist Bob Rusay described Webster's basslines on the album as "goofy".

The album has been noted for the "belching" vocal performance of Chris Barnes, which consists of largely incoherent death growls. Loudwire said his performance consists of him "slicing and dicing his words."

== Lyrics ==
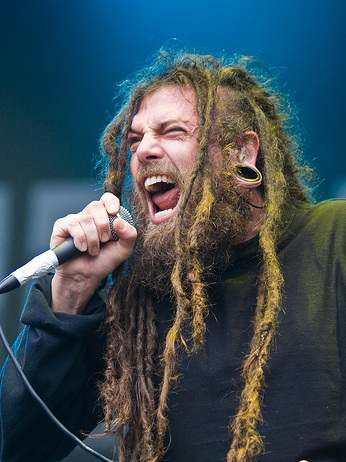
Original vocalist Chris Barnes wrote all of the album's lyrics

The album's lyrical content is considered to be some of the most extreme of the band's career, exploring themes such as necrophilia, sexual violence, blunt trauma, sadism, mutilation, insanity, dismemberment, disembowelment, exhumation, child murder, pedophilia, cannibalism, serial killing, incest and autoerotic asphyxiation. According to Invisible Oranges, "Where before the band had wallowed in a more simplistic sense of excessive violence, Cannibal Corpse came out of 1992 with something darker and scarier, a beast with a unified vision of horror from which it was impossible to look away." Metal Hammer wrote that the album is "bulging with moments of stomach-churning horror" and called its lyrical content "provocatively over-the-top". Chris Dick of Decibel recalled that the album's lyrics made him "feel ill" while reading them as a teenager, saying: "I thought if I was caught with the sleeve I'd be expelled or placed in some type of protective custody." The album's song titles have been called "despicable".

Vocalist Chris Barnes singlehandedly penned the album's lyrics, and composed them to complement the increasing extremities of the band's instrumentation; bassist Alex Webster recounted that they "placed no limits" on him throughout the process. He said: "He'd come to us with the most vile, repugnant stuff and we'd be like, ‘Sure! Why not?' We were trying to make the most extreme and aggressive music we could, so why not have the most antagonistic lyrics too?" Barnes' lyrics on the album drew influence from true crime, with which he had a fascination. He described the album's lyrics as "insanity put to music," and as "a madman's brain on tape." Barnes also stated that the intent behind his style was to "invoke thought" by horrifying readers with what he called a "twisted dichotomy," comparable to watching a horror film.

The fourth track "Split Wide Open" is about a couple who repeatedly birth children so the mother can slaughter them and the father can conduct experiments on their dead bodies, placing their genitalia in jars.

Sociologist Natalie J. Purcell assessed the album's fifth track, "Necropedophile", as "[offering] Barnes' speculation on the inner workings of the deranged mind driven to murder children and rape their dead bodies". She added: "Lyrics such as these not only touch on the physical effects of depravity, but contemplate the psychological state of a person suffering from this derangement."

The album's seventh track, "Entrails Ripped from a Virgin's Cunt", which has been called "arguably the most offensive song in the Cannibal Corpse canon", is based on a story that a former prison employee had recounted to Barnes about two inmates who were serving life sentences for kidnapping a young girl and raping and disemboweling her with a coat hanger, which Barnes was deeply disturbed by. Metal Hammer called the line "mutilated with a machete" one of the track's "more upbeat [and] uplifting" lines. Guitarist Jack Owen opined that the track was objectively mediocre, and stated that "people were [just] so floored by the song title" when the album was released.

Barnes himself was quoted saying: "For me, it's hard to lyrically or vocally decide if Butchered or Tomb is the most intense. Both are lyrically obscene."

== Artwork ==
The album's cover artwork was created by Vince Locke, and depicts a male and female zombie engaged in cunnilingus. Locke opined in the Centuries of Torment documentary that the previous two album covers were "just about the violence, [and when] you bring the sex into it, it's even more shocking." According to Chris Dick of Decibel: "The imagery is so disgusting it begs to be looked at over and over again. The detail is phenomenal." Chris Barnes relayed the concept of two zombies "eating each other out" to Locke, who has recalled that he faced challenges with perspective and with positioning the zombies' bodies while creating the piece. Metal Blade Records president Brian Slagel reportedly rejected the original incarnation of the album artwork because it was not "gory enough", so Locke added deep lacerations to the female zombie's face, neck, thighs and wrists. The original incarnation of the album art also did not feature the blue and grey tones on the zombies' skin, and the corpses were initially entirely white. Original guitarist Bob Rusay commended Slagel for pushing the band, saying in 2008: "Brian Slagel is a really good guy. He knows how to put a good product out there." Barnes said he was "affected" upon seeing the album artwork for the first time, and described it as "zombie pornography". The band's other original guitarist, Jack Owen, recalled it as the moment he realized the band had finally, "really gone too far," and believed they would not get away with it. Alex Webster said: "I was never sure if the girl was alive and enjoying it or just dead and the zombie was literally eating her." Paul Mazurkiewicz called the artwork "utter insanity".

Invisible Oranges suggested the artwork could be "a modern interpretation" of "Pocałunek" by Alfred Kubin. The site described the album artwork as "two ivory-skinned gutted lovers caught in an act of mortal cunnilingus, the ambience set with candles, a rotting severed head, and a butcher knife. The expression on the woman's face is not one of agony, terror, or mania, but of despair and lust."

The album's interior artwork features photos of the band taken in a Buffalo train station.

== Critical reception ==
Professional ratings
Review scores
Source	Rating
AllMusic	link
Collector's Guide to Heavy Metal	8/10
Rock Hard	8.5/10

Tomb of the Mutilated has received positive reviews from critics, both contemporarily and retrospectively. Heavy metal webzine Kicked in the Face praised the album's musicianship but criticized the tone of Barnes' vocals and Scott Burns' production. Metal Storm praised the album's songwriting, production and progression over its predecessor, but criticized the one-dimensional nature of the album's lyrics. Vincent Jeffries of AllMusic gave the album three stars out of five, and named "Beyond the Cemetery", "Split Wide Open" and "The Cryptic Stench" as the album's highlights.

== Legacy and impact ==
Upon its release, Tomb of the Mutilated was regarded as having altered the course of the death metal genre "forever", and is now considered by some to be one of the greatest and most influential death metal albums of all time. In 2008, Chris Dick of Decibel said: "Tomb of the Mutilated was the most grotesque, yet commercially viable death metal album ever. It made soccer moms scream and their kids wonder if sheer possession alone could lead to marathon family counseling sessions." Invisible Oranges said the album was "nothing short of a musical milestone within heavy metal as a whole." In 2017, Justin Norton of Decibel wrote that "death metal bands are still trying to create something as outwardly offensive and antisocial as the Hall of Fame-certified Tomb of the Mutilated and falling short."

Loudwire said "Tomb of the Mutilated brought Cannibal Corpse to the forefront of the genre, now fully equipped to compete with contemporaries like Morbid Angel, Death and Suffocation." Vincent Jefferies of AllMusic argued that the "powerful musical focus" of Cannibal Corpse's early albums, including Tomb of the Mutilated, have contributed to the band's longevity and lasting impact. He stated: "Learned fans have come to appreciate Tomb of the Mutilated as a solid, if not important, offering [...] Cannibal Corpse somehow managed to outlast many of their more critically accepted contemporaries due in no small part to early career efforts like [this one]."

The album's opening track "Hammer Smashed Face" is considered the band's signature song, and is considered by some to be one of the greatest death metal songs ever written. Jon Wiederhorn of Loudwire included the song in his list of "The Most Disgusting Metal Lyrics of All Time". The same publication said the song contains "one of the most stomach churning breakdowns ever recorded". In 2005, Tomb of the Mutilated was ranked number 278 in Rock Hard magazine's book of The 500 Greatest Rock & Metal Albums of All Time.

In the 2008 book Precious Metal, Chris Dick of Decibel called the album's cover artwork "legendary". He is quoted saying: "I remember a friend of mine slamming the audio cassette of Tomb on my desk in high school saying, 'Dude, this makes your Bolt Thrower sound gay.' That was my first impression of the record." Interviewed for the 2008 Centuries of Torment documentary, Trivium guitarist Corey Beaulieu claims his mother confiscated his copy of Tomb of the Mutilated when he was a teenager after reading the album's song titles. Late The Black Dahlia Murder vocalist Trevor Strnad claimed he had to shelve the album after purchasing it, recalling "me and my bowl cut and my Harry Potter glasses are not ready for this shit". Rapper Ice-T referred to the album's lyrical content as "crazy shit".

In 2009, Metal Hammer wrote that the album "summed up the Cannibal Corpse ethos brilliantly," and that it represented the death metal genre "at its twisted best; musically destructive, lyrically deranged and custom-built to delight and offend all the right people."

In 2012, "I cum blood" was referred to as the "worst pickup line ever" by Exclaim! In 2015, Loudwire named the album as the 24th best extreme metal album of all time, saying: "The band hit their stride in 1992, perfecting one of the most copied styles in the genre." In 2016, Vice said the album's "wall of sound was catchy enough to demand repeat listens."

In 2017, Loudwire named the album as one of the greatest Metal Blade Records releases, saying the band's "infamy as death metal’s supreme gore-mongers [had been] carved in stone" with its release.

In 2021, Stereogum ranked Tomb as the third-best Cannibal Corpse album, stating that "all 10,000 of its riffs are fucking perfect." He added: "The interplay between guitarists Jack Owen and Bob Rusay is the finest it ever was in their shared stint in Cannibal, with Owen's right hand bashing out rhythmic brain-benders while Rusay reaches deep in his bag for expressionistic, stabbing leads."

In 2022, a video of a security guard reacting with confusion (and laughing afterward) to George Fisher announcing "I Cum Blood" at a live performance gained popularity on social media. In 2024, Phoenix New Times included the song in its list of "The 30 most disturbing songs of all time." Staff writer Mac McCann wrote: "The song is gross. Like, disgustingly gross. Fortunately, you can't really understand a word he's saying unless you look up the lyrics. We don't recommend it."

== In popular culture ==
"Hammer Smashed Face" was featured during the band's cameo appearance in the 1994 comedy film Ace Ventura: Pet Detective starring Jim Carrey. Carrey was a fan of the band and requested they appear in the film. Guitarist Rob Barrett recalled the actor was more excited to meet the band than they were to meet him. Drummer Paul Mazurkiewicz recalls: "They took us over to the [actors'] trailers, and Jim comes over to us wearing his Ace Ventura garb, going, 'Oh my god! Cannibal Corpse! It's so great to have you guys here!' Then he starts rattling off lyrics and tells us he wants us to play 'Hammer Smashed Face.' It was insane." After the band had shot scenes for Ace Ventura, they were offered another cameo in the film Airheads, though this offer was revoked when the producer learned the band had already done a cameo for Ace Ventura. Paul Mazurkiewicz has stated that the band is frequently told by fans that they were introduced to the band (and death metal in general) through the film, adding, "if you worked out an average, it would probably be one person a day".

The song was also added as downloadable content for the Rock Band video game series. The song "I Cum Blood" is also featured in the video game Grand Theft Auto IV: The Lost and Damned.

== Track listing ==
All lyrics written by Chris Barnes. All music written by Cannibal Corpse.

No.	Title	Length
1.	"Hammer Smashed Face"	4:02
2.	"I Cum Blood"	3:40
3.	"Addicted to Vaginal Skin"	3:29
4.	"Split Wide Open"	3:01
5.	"Necropedophile"	4:05
6.	"The Cryptic Stench"	3:57
7.	"Entrails Ripped from a Virgin's Cunt"	4:14
8.	"Post Mortal Ejaculation"	3:35
9.	"Beyond the Cemetery"	4:52
Total length:		35:11

Bonus track
No.	Title	Length
10.	"I Cum Blood" (live)	4:13
Total length:		39:24

== Personnel ==
Cannibal Corpse

- Chris Barnes – vocals
- Bob Rusay – guitars
- Jack Owen – guitars
- Alex Webster – bass
- Paul Mazurkiewicz – drums

Additional musicians

- Pat O'Brien – lead guitar on live bonus track
- George "Corpsegrinder" Fisher – vocals on live bonus track

Production

- Produced, engineered and mixed by Scott Burns

== Charts ==
Chart performance for Tomb of the Mutilated
Chart (1995)	Peak position
Australian Albums (ARIA)	182

== See also ==
- Precious Metal, a 2009 music history book edited by Albert Mudrian of Decibel containing in-depth interviews regarding the recording of Tomb of the Mutilated
