= Fucked with a Knife =

Song by Cannibal Corpse

from the album The Bleeding
- Released: 1994
- Studio: Morrisound Recording
- Genre: Death metal
- Length: 2:15
- Label: Metal Blade Records
- Composer: Cannibal Corpse
- Lyricist: Chris Barnes
- Producer: Scott Burns

"Fucked with a Knife" is a song by American death metal band Cannibal Corpse, released as the second track on their fourth studio album The Bleeding. It is considered a classic in the band's early catalog.

== Composition and lyrics ==
Decibel said the song musically "ebbs and flows and races to its conclusion before you do anything else." "Fucked with a Knife" is considered to be one of the band's most extreme and offensive song titles to date. Revolver said the song title "says everything you need to know about the album." Metal Injection described the track as "sexually sanguinary".
