= Raising Hell (Wiederhorn book) =

2020 book by Jon Wiederhorn

- Editor: Jon Wiederhorn
- Language: English
- Genre: Music history
- Publisher: Diversion Books
- Publication date: January 7, 2020

Raising Hell: Backstage Tales from the Lives of Metal Legends is a music history book edited by Jon Wiederhorn of Loudwire, published by Diversion Books on January 7, 2020. The book features interviews from various heavy metal musicians from throughout the genre's history.
