= The Bleeding (album) =

Studio album by Cannibal Corpse
- Released: April 12, 1994
- Recorded: November 12 – December 3, 1993
- Studios: Morrisound Recording, Tampa, FL
- Genre: Death metal
- Length: 36:54
- Label: Metal Blade
- Producer: Scott Burns

Cannibal Corpse chronology
Tomb of the Mutilated (1992)	The Bleeding (1994)	Vile (1996)

Remastered cover (2006)

Remastered cover (2009)

The Bleeding is the fourth studio album by American death metal band Cannibal Corpse, released on April 12, 1994 through Metal Blade Records. It was recorded at Morrisound Recording in Tampa, Florida and was produced by Scott Burns.

The album's music is considered to be much more groove-oriented and "commercial" than its three predecessors, making use of linear song structures and hooks. Although the album continues the sexual violence themes present on Tomb of the Mutilated, its lyrics are considered by some to be less extreme than on previous releases, with some tracks exploring psychological horror themes. Frontman Chris Barnes' vocal performance is decidedly more enunciated, a departure from the indecipherable vocal style he had become known for on previous releases. As with Tomb, the album's production and audio mix elevate the bass performance of Alex Webster.

It is the last album featuring singer and founding member Chris Barnes and is the first album featuring guitarist Rob Barrett. According to SoundScan numbers, The Bleeding is the fifth top-selling death metal LP in the United States, amassing over 98,300 copies sold. The Bleeding is also Cannibal Corpse's most successful album to date.

The Bleeding is considered by most publications to be one of the band's finest albums, and some consider it to be one of the greatest heavy metal releases of the 1990s. "Staring Through the Eyes of the Dead" and "Stripped, Raped and Strangled" have become staples of the band’s live sets.

== Background and recording ==
Following the Tomb of the Mutilated album cycle, and original guitarist Bob Rusay's replacement with Rob Barrett, producer Scott Burns pushed the band to compose stronger material and be "right up there with the best death metal bands in the world," such as Morbid Angel and Death. The band composed and arranged the album's material during the winter in a haunted house. Barrett claims to have cowritten several of the album's tracks with Webster and Owen. The band members have stated that tensions were high between them during this time.

The album was recorded at Morrisound Recording in Tampa, Florida during the fall of 1993.

A video was made for the song "Staring Through the Eyes of the Dead". A re-mastered version of The Bleeding is available and features new cover art, a bonus track ("The Exorcist", a Possessed cover) and the music video of "Staring Through the Eyes of the Dead". This music video would later be featured in Beavis and Butt-Head.

== Music and lyrics ==
Called "the essence of Cannibal Corpse," the music on The Bleeding is generally considered to be less extreme, more mature, and more accessible than on the band's prior releases. Decibel said that the band "set to change their destiny from shock to substance."

The Bleeding is noted for its more advanced musicianship and refined approach to songwriting when compared to its predecessors, and according to Metal Hammer, it "added brains to the blood and gore". According to drummer Paul Mazurkiewicz, "This was the era where we started really refining our sound and it was the beginning of a more modern Cannibal style of writing." Justin Norton of Decibel said, "While Butchered at Birth and Tomb were cudgel strikes, The Bleeding is more a methodical surgeon’s cut." According to Barnes, "I think they were wanting to, in a way, prove themselves as well-skilled musicians." Founding guitarist Jack Owen believed The Bleeding to be "almost a commercial evolution in death metal songwriting." The album's song structures have been described as more "linear" than on the band's previous work. The album has also been called "death metal with hooks," and “Stripped, Raped, And Strangled" has been called "as close to a radio single as the band would ever write.”

Rich Hobson of Metal Hammer wrote that the addition of Rob Barrett on guitar "brought a tightness and precision to the Cannibal Corpse sound that had been conspicuous by its absence on their earlier albums". The album's lead guitar parts have been likened to Slayer. As with its predecessor, the bass guitar is extremely prominent in the album's mix. According to bassist Alex Webster, "All the songs have cool little bass things that jump out and go a little bit beyond what the guitar is doing in a particular section – for example, there’s a bunch of cool almost-solos on the bass in An Experiment In Homicide."

The album has more groove-based sections than previous releases. Decibel said: "They’re not just slamming toward the finish line like they used to: they’re playing as a unit, and they’re focused on a common goal." The slower riffs on "Return to Flesh" have drawn comparisons to fellow New York death metal band Immolation. The album still contains some "straight ahead death metal" songs in the vein of the band's earlier releases, with Decibel stating that the track "Pulverized" would not sound "out of place" on Tomb of the Mutilated. and some of the album's grooves have been described as "pure filth." The album is also noted for the more decipherable approach to vocals by Chris Barnes. According to Greg Pratt of Exclaim, the album foreshadows the style Barnes would pursue in his work with his next project, Six Feet Under. His vocals on the album have been described as "hideous." Barnes himself said in early 2025: "It just felt right to enunciate and pronounce the lyrics more clearly [on ''The Bleeding''] because I felt the music was more clearly pronounced. [...] I think that at that point in time I wanted to prove to myself that I could still sing really heavy [...] but people could understand my lyrics more, because the lyrics [and storylines] are very important to me [...] it’s an artwork to me [...] and I want my art to be heard."

In addition to the macabre and sexual violence themes present on the band's previous albums, the lyrical content on The Bleeding also explores psychological horror. In a 1994 interview with MTV, Barnes said, "I think there's many faces of horror, and you can explore the different types of horror out there."

== Reception and legacy ==
Professional ratings
Review scores
Source	Rating
Allmusic	4/5 stars
Collector's Guide to Heavy Metal	6/10

Jason Birchmeier of AllMusic called The Bleeding one of the "standout death metal albums of the mid-'90s". Chris Krovatin of Kerrang! said, "Showing a confident sense of style, an indomitable momentum, and some of the band’s most iconic and memorable songs, this record is a declaration of the Cannibal Corpse we’ve all come to know and shed blood for in the past two-plus decades." Metal Hammer named The Bleeding as one of the best metal albums of the 1990s, saying it contains "some of the most horrifyingly violent and undeniably catchy anthems in the band’s arsenal." Joe DiVita of Loudwire named The Bleeding as the best death metal album of 1994. Metal Injection included the album's second track "Fucked with a Knife" in its list of "The 10 Gnarliest Extreme Metal Lyrics", joking "maybe they got rid of Chris Barnes after The Bleeding because the band was close to going respectable. Just look at that romance".

"Staring Through the Eyes of the Dead" and "Stripped, Raped and Strangled" have become staples of the band’s live sets. Founding guitarist Jack Owen cited The Bleeding as his favorite Cannibal Corpse album. Bassist Alex Webster said, "I feel that The Bleeding was a big step forward for me as a bass player, and as a band it put us on the same level as some of the other groups we thought were a little more professional-sounding than we were. We looked up to bands like Morbid Angel and Death."

In 2013, OC Weekly said the album was "a must have for any fan of death metal or extreme metal."

In 2021, Brad Sanders of Stereogum ranked The Bleeding as the worst Cannibal Corpse album, stating his opinion that the album's lyrics and song titles had not aged well. He wrote: "The band’s [...] effort to clean up their production for a broader audience rendered Chris Barnes’ voice crystal-clear for the first time, a choice that meant their most grotesque lyrics to date were also their most legible. The tasteless lyrics weren’t the only problem with The Bleeding. The sterile production doesn’t work for Cannibal Corpse’s sound, and guitars that should sound like buzzsaws sound flat and distant. There are diehard fans who consider this the best Cannibal Corpse record. To each their own."

In 2025, Joe DiVita of Loudwire named The Bleeding as the best death metal release of 1994. He wrote: "In 1994, these gorehounds just couldn’t be matched. [...] The Bleeding possesses the perfect combination of fleet-fingered fretwork, pulsating rhythmic beatdowns and catchy songwriting that culminated in a string of Cannibal Corpse favorites."

== Track listing ==
All lyrics are written by Chris Barnes.

No.	Title	Music	Length
1.	"Staring Through the Eyes of the Dead"	Alex Webster; Jack Owen	3:30
2.	"Fucked with a Knife"	Webster	2:15
3.	"Stripped, Raped and Strangled"	Webster; Owen; Rob Barrett	3:27
4.	"Pulverized"	Webster; Owen	3:35
5.	"Return to Flesh"	Webster; Owen	4:21
6.	"The Pick-Axe Murders"	Webster	3:03
7.	"She Was Asking for It"	Webster; Owen; Barrett	4:33
8.	"The Bleeding"	Owen	4:20
9.	"Force Fed Broken Glass"	Webster; Owen; Barrett	5:02
10.	"An Experiment in Homicide"	Webster; Owen; Barrett	2:36
Total length:			36:54

Remastered version bonus track
No.	Title	Lyrics	Music	Length
11.	"The Exorcist" (Possessed cover)	Mike Torrao	Torrao	4:36

== Credits ==
Writing, performance and production credits are adapted from the album liner notes.

=== Personnel ===
==== Cannibal Corpse ====
- Chris Barnes – vocals
- Rob Barrett - guitars
- Jack Owen - guitars
- Alex Webster – bass
- Paul Mazurkiewicz – drums

==== Production ====
- Scott Burns – production, recording, engineering, mixing, mastering

==== Artwork and design ====
- Vincent Locke – cover art
- Brian Ames – design
- Frank White – photography
- Joe Giron – photography

=== Studios ===
- Morrisound Recording, Tampa, FL, USA – recording, mixing
- Fullersound – mastering

== Charts ==
Chart performance for The Bleeding
Chart (1994)	Peak position
Australian Albums (ARIA)	169
US Heatseekers Albums (Billboard)	30

== See also ==
- Florida death metal
- Morrisound Recording
