= Entrails Ripped from a Virgin's Cunt =

Song by Cannibal Corpse

from the album Tomb of the Mutilated
- Released: September 1992
- Studio: Morrisound Recording
- Genre: Death metal
- Length: 4:14
- Label: Metal Blade Records
- Composer: Alex Webster
- Lyricist: Chris Barnes
- Producer: Scott Burns

"Entrails Ripped from a Virgin's Cunt" is a song by American death metal band Cannibal Corpse, released in 1992 as the seventh track from their third studio album Tomb of the Mutilated.

Original Cannibal Corpse frontman Chris Barnes was inspired to write the song after being profoundly disturbed by a story he had heard from a former prison employee. The track is primarily recognized for the extreme vulgarity of its title and its perverse lyrical content, and is considered a classic from the band's early catalog. The music was composed by bassist Alex Webster.

It is one of the band's most controversial and infamous songs, and was publicly criticized by prominent political figures in the United States such as Bob Dole in the years following its release. The song has appeared in numerous listicles focused on controversial songs and titles, and has also been discussed outside of the realm of music journalism, receiving analysis in scholarly articles within the musicology field.

== Background and lyrics ==
Lyricist Chris Barnes explained in the 2009 music history book Precious Metal that "Entrails Ripped from a Virgin's Cunt" was inspired by a story he had heard from a former prison employee about two brothers who were serving a life sentence for kidnapping and violating a young girl with a coat hanger. Original Cannibal Corpse guitarist Jack Owen recalled thinking the band had "finally gone too far" with the song title during the album's production, and initially believed they would not "get away with it". The guitarist expressed personal disenchantment with the track despite its status as a "hit", stating the belief that fans were simply flabbergasted by the title and little else. He self-described the track and the rest of the material on Tomb of the Mutilated as "abrasive and brutal". Bassist Alex Webster stated that the song's title was the result of the band placing no limitations on Barnes during the album's writing process and telling him "you can go as gory as you want."

"Entrails Ripped from a Virgin's Cunt" is considered to be one of the most grotesque Cannibal Corpse songs, and numerous publications have made note of its title and lyrics for their sheer vulgarity. The song's lyrics bluntly describe the act of mutilating a female victim with a machete from the perspective of a sadistic killer, and according to Metal Hammer, significantly more heinous acts are additionally described by the song's narrator. The song further details other severe acts of cruelty including physical restraint, gagging, disembowelment, internal bleeding, necrophilia and rape.

Metal Hammer said the song was "provocatively over-the-top", and Yahoo Entertainment described it as "viscerally vivid". The Quietus described the song as "truly nauseating", and PopMatters called the title "jaw-dropping". The track was discussed in a 2013 scholarly paper titled "'Split Wide Open' – Cannibal Corpse and Carnographic Pleasure" written by musicologist Catherine Hoad, who described the track as "traumatizing" and as an "unavoidably carnographic experience".

== Controversy ==
Despite its status as a cult classic in Cannibal Corpse's early discography, "Entrails Ripped from a Virgin's Cunt" has received negative feedback from some conservative political entities in the United States. American politician and attorney Bob Dole openly criticized the song in 1995 while serving as a US Senator, claiming it "violated human decency", according to a report by Yahoo Entertainment. American Ideas Institute magazine The American Conservative quoted the song's chorus in an article accusing Russian fashion stylist Lotta Volkova of being "obsessed with Satanic themes, child abuse, cannibalism [and] violence", claiming she had posted a picture of herself wearing a Cannibal Corpse shirt to her Instagram page.

Discussing the track and others like it in 2012 with MetalSucks, Webster stated that while he understood why some onlookers from outside the extreme metal community found the lyrics to be problematic, he also expressed frustration towards people apparently failing to understand that the subject matter is not meant for listeners to find relatable:

"Obviously, when we sing something like 'Entrails Ripped from a Virgin's Cunt', that has nothing to do with anything any of us ever have done, or will do, or would ever want to do. Real-world violence is bad. We don't empathize with the characters in our songs. They're not people we admire. [...] But because a lot of music has people writing songs where they empathize with the lyrics very much, and the lyrics are very expressive, people assume that maybe we're like that, too. [...] So that misunderstanding is annoying, but I understand it. I'm not angry, I just get that they don't get where we're coming from. [...] I think if they looked a little deeper, they'd see where we're coming from and it wouldn't bother them."

== Legacy ==
The song has received semi-significant coverage from the music press in the years following its release, mostly appearing in listicles compiling songs with extreme or controversial titles or lyrics. It remains one of the most notorious Cannibal Corpse songs and is widely considered to be one of Chris Barnes' most extreme lyrical pieces by both critics and the band themselves. In 2013, entertainment news website WhatCulture listed the song at No. 13 on its list of the "20 Most Controversial Songs of All Time". The site said "it takes a brave band to release a song with a title such as this!" In 2019, British heavy metal music magazine Kerrang! included the song in its list of "13 Of The Most Explicit Rock and Metal Song Titles Ever". In 2021, guitarist community website Ultimate Guitar included the song in its list of the "15 Most Offensive Songs of All Time". Staff writer David Slavković wrote: "Cannibal Corpse's lyrics are deliberately gory and disgusting. That's pretty much like horror movies turned into songs. It's not like the band members would actually do this stuff or support it."
