= Repulsion (band) =

American grindcore band

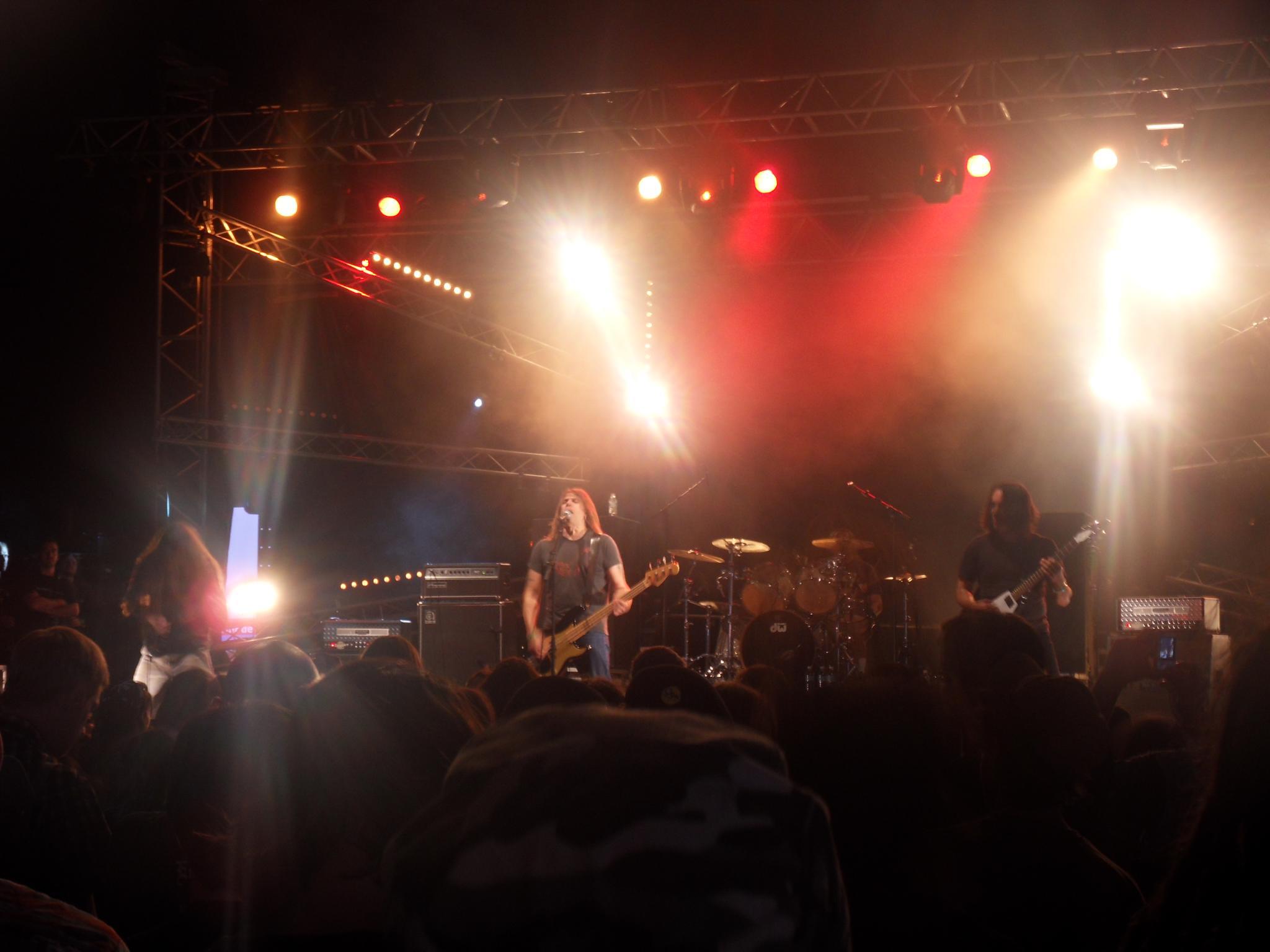
- Repulsion performing live in 2009. From left to right: Mike Beams, Scott Carlson, Col Jones, Matt Olivo.

Background information
- Also known as: Tempter (1984); Ultraviolence (1984); Genocide (1984–1986)
- Origin: Flint, Michigan, United States
- Genres: Grindcore; hardcore punk; thrash metal (early)
- Years active: 1984–1985, 1985–1988, 1990–1993, 2003–present
- Labels: Necrosis; Earache; Relapse
- Members: Scott Carlson; Matt Olivo; Chris Moore
- Past members: James Auten; Phill Hines; Aaron Freeman; Dave "Grave" Hollingshead; Col Jones; Tom "Fish" Perro; Matt Harvey; Mike Beams; Marissa Martinez

Repulsion is an American grindcore band from Flint, Michigan, founded in 1984 by Scott Carlson and Matt Olivo.

The band underwent many name changes before eventually settling on Repulsion after Carlson and Olivo left Death in the mid-1980s, recruiting Dave "Grave" Hollingshead as their drummer. The band subsequently recorded their debut album Horrified in 1986, releasing it three years later.

The band has been cited as an influence on numerous bands since its initial run, including Cannibal Corpse and Napalm Death.

== History ==
In 1984, Matt Olivo and Scott Carlson, with bassist Sean MacDonald, formed Tempter, a metal act covering Bay Area thrash metal bands, such as Slayer and Metallica. The group's sound became increasingly infused with hardcore punk when Phil Hines, of Flint hardcore punk band Dissonance, joined as a drummer. They juggled band names, first renaming themselves Ultraviolence and then Genocide before recording their first demo in 1984. In spite of their growing popularity in the underground Genocide struggled to survive and faced difficulty maintaining a consistent lineup.

In the summer of 1985, Chuck Schuldiner, of pioneering death metal act Death, invited Carlson and Olivo to Florida to complete the Death lineup. The two parties failed to settle on a uniform creative direction and the merger proved short lived. Carlson and Olivo returned to Flint that summer, determined to reform Genocide. Local punk Dave "Grave" Hollingshead was recruited as drummer, after Carlson and Olivo saw an article about Hollingshead being arrested for grave robbery.

In 1985, the reformed Genocide recorded the Violent Death demo tape, with Carlson assuming bass duties, and resumed playing live locally. In late 1985, Aaron Freeman was invited into the band as a second guitarist. With their line-up fleshed out, Genocide recorded in a studio for the first time to lay down the tracks for what was supposed to be their first album The Stench of Burning Death – it ended up being their third demo. By 1986, Repulsion's trademark style had matured; characterised by raspy shouted vocals, extremely distorted down-tuned guitars, overdriven punkish riffs, absurd rambling solos interjected as if only as an afterthought, rumbling bass lines, and machine-gun drumming.

Finally, in 1989, Repulsion's material enjoyed modest, albeit posthumous, exposure when UK grindcore pioneers Carcass distributed a Repulsion compilation titled Horrified on their own Necrosis Records label; a subsidiary of Earache Records. With interest in Repulsion rekindled, the band decided to reform in 1990. They resumed playing live with the (almost) 'classic' Repulsion lineup: Scott Carlson bass and vocals, Aaron Freeman on guitar, and Dave Grave on drums; Matt Olivo, then serving in the army, filled in as a second guitarist when possible. Repulsion recorded two self-financed demos in 1991: Rebirth, and their Final Demo, often criticised as lacking the drive and intensity of the band's earlier material. Later that year they managed to release a single on Relapse entitled Excruciation. In spite of new material the band broke up yet again in 1993. Scott Carlson went on to play in Cathedral briefly, the rest of the band departed for short-lived projects or simply returned to everyday life. Relapse re-released Horrified again in 2003, drawing attention to Repulsion once more, and prompting the band to resume live performance. Their official return to the stage took place at the Maryland Deathfest in 2004. In 2008, Repulsion opened for At the Gates on their "Suicidal Final Tour" in California, along with Darkest Hour and Municipal Waste. Since then, Repulsion has continued to perform sporadically at major extreme metal festivals worldwide, including return appearances at Maryland Deathfest (2011, 2013, 2016), as well as Hellfest (2013) and Damnation Festival (2012). In 2019, the band celebrated the 30th anniversary of Horrified with a special performance at the Decibel Metal & Beer Fest.

As of September 2026, the band is still adding dates to perform as they were added to the lineup of Maryland Deathfest for 2027.

== Musical style and influences ==
The band is usually classified as a grindcore and goregrind band. William York of AllMusic wrote, "the band's sound fell somewhere between the earlier proto-grind of Boston hardcore band Siege and the more fully developed grindcore of the early Napalm Death recordings, at least as far as the evolutionary ladder goes. They were also one of the first metal bands to use horror- and gore-oriented lyrics, thereby helping start a tradition that soon would descend to deeper and deeper depths of depravity as successive bands strove harder and harder to outdo one another."

The band plays fast, short songs usually between 1 and 2 minutes in length, often featuring thrash metal riffs and blast beats.

Lyrical themes explored by the band include torture, mutilation, dismemberment and murder.

Venom, Hellhammer, Celtic Frost, Discharge, Possessed, N.Y.C. Mayhem, Slayer, Slaughter, Exodus, and Crucifix have been repeatedly cited in interviews as major influences.

== Legacy ==
William York of AllMusic describes Repulsion's music as having "held up fairly well over the years" while at the same time calling out the relative simplicity of their songs and the primitive nature of their production.

Others have suggested Horrified as laying the groundwork for other bands, including Cannibal Corpse, Death, and Pestilence.

Shane Embury and Mitch Harris have both cited the album as a massive influence on Napalm Death, while Anders Björler of At the Gates credited the band with exposing him to grindcore and death metal. Mortiis cited Horrified as an influence.

Various bands have recorded covers of Repulsion songs, including Napalm Death, Impaled and Entombed.

Brutal Truth bassist Dan Lilker said he was surprised at the speed of the band when he first heard their demo; vocalist Kevin Sharp considered Carlson's bass tone to be genre-defining for grindcore, comparing it to the influence of the Ramones' "riffing" on punk music and Dave Lombardo's "Reign in Blood beat" on thrash metal.

Soilwork drummer Dirk Verbeuren expressed admiration for the album, which he considered a "grindcore milestone".

Fenriz of Darkthrone has a tattoo of the cover of Horrified on his arm.

== Members ==
=== Current ===
- Scott Carlson - vocals (1984-1985, 1985–1988, 1990-1993, 2003–present), bass (1985–1988, 1990-1993, 2003–present)
- Matt Olivo - guitar (1984-1985, 1985–1988, 1990-1993, 2003–present)
- Chris Moore - drums (2014–present)

=== Former ===
- James Auten - drums (1984)
- Sean MacDonald - bass (1985)
- Phill Hines - drums (1984)
- Aaron Freeman - guitar (1985-1988, 1990-1993, 2003–2005)
- Dave "Grave" Hollingshead - drums (1985-1988, 1990-1993, 2003–2005)
- Col Jones - drums (2005-2014)
- Thomas Puro- drums (1986)
- Matt Harvey - guitar (2005-2008)
- Mike Beams - guitar (2008-2011)
- Marissa Martinez - guitar (2011-2013)

== Discography ==
=== Demos ===
- Rehearsal Tape (1984)
- Stench of Burning Death (1984)
- Violent Death (1985)
- WFBE (1986)
- Slaughter of the Innocent (1986)
- Rebirth (1991)
- Final Demo (1991)

=== Single ===
- "Excruciation" (Relapse Records, 1991)

=== Album ===
- Horrified (Necrosis Records, 1989; Relapse Records, 1992, 2003; Southern Lord Records, 2006)

=== Split ===
- Relapse Singles Series Vol. 3 (Relapse Records, 2004)

== Bibliography ==
- Bennett, J. (April 2013). "Slaves to the Grind". Terrorizer. No. 234. Dark Arts Ltd. pp. 28–29. ISSN 1350-6978.
- Mudrian, Albert (2004). Choosing Death : The Improbable History of Death Metal & Grindcore (1st ed.). US: Feral House. ISBN 1-932595-04-X.
- Widener, Matthew (August 2008). "Scared to Death: The Making of Repulsion's Horrified". In Mudrian, Albert (ed.). Precious Metal: Decibel Presents the Stories Behind 25 Extreme Metal Masterpieces. Da Capo Press. pp. 73–84. ISBN 9780786749621.
