= Precious Metal (book) =

Music history book

- Editor: Albert Mudrian
- Genre: Music history
- Publisher: Da Capo Press
- Publication date: 2009

Precious Metal: Decibel Presents the Stories Behind 25 Extreme Metal Masterpieces is a music history book edited by Decibel editor-in-chief Albert Mudrian and published by Da Capo Press in 2009. It details the creation of several extreme metal albums, such as Cannibal Corpse's 1992 album Tomb of the Mutilated and Slayer's 1986 album Reign in Blood, and contains interviews from band members.
