= Grindcore =

Extreme genre of music

- Stylistic origins: Hardcore punk; crust punk; thrashcore; extreme metal; thrash metal; industrial; noise
- Cultural origins: Mid-1980s, England
- Derivative forms: Mathcore; sass; white belt grind; Brutal death metal

Fusion genres
- Deathgrind; goregrind; pornogrind

Regional scenes
- Brazil; United Kingdom

Local scenes
- Birmingham

Other topics
- Anarcho-punk; crossover thrash; D-beat; death metal; industrial metal; metalcore; powerviolence; sludge metal; speedcore

Grindcore is an extreme fusion genre of heavy metal and hardcore punk that originated in the mid-1980s, drawing inspiration from abrasive-sounding musical styles, such as thrashcore, crust punk, and industrial. Grindcore is considered a more noise-filled style of hardcore punk while using hardcore's trademark characteristics such as heavily distorted, down-tuned guitars, grinding overdriven bass, high-speed tempo, blast beats, and vocals which consist of growls, shouts and high-pitched shrieks. Early groups such as England's Napalm Death are credited with laying the groundwork for the style. It is most prevalent today in North America and Europe, with popular contributors such as Brutal Truth and Nasum. Lyrical themes range from a primary focus on social and political concerns, to gory subject matter and black humor.

A trait of grindcore is the "microsong", far shorter than average for punk or metal. Several bands have produced songs that are only seconds in length. Many bands, such as Agoraphobic Nosebleed, record simple phrases that may be rhythmically sprawled out across an instrumental lasting only a couple of bars in length.

A variety of subgenres and microgenres have subsequently emerged, often labeling bands according to traits that deviate from regular grindcore; including goregrind, focused on themes of gore (e.g. mutilation and pathology), and pornogrind, fixated on pornographic lyrical themes. Another offshoot is cybergrind which incorporates electronic music elements such as sampling and programmed drums. Although influential within hardcore punk and extreme metal, grindcore remains an underground form of music.

== Characteristics ==
There are blurry lines that separate death metal, grindcore, and thrash metal and even black metal; some bands certainly overlap these genres. What sets grindcore apart mostly is how bands push the limits known to extreme music with more intensity, speed, intensity and lyrics. Short, buzzing riffs fast enough to snap necks; guttural vocals, and blast beats underneath it all define some of grindcore's key characteristics.

— Alex Distefano of OC Weekly (March 4, 2014)

Known for being "among the noisiest, fastest and rawest kinds of metal," grindcore is influenced by crust punk, thrashcore, hardcore punk, death metal and thrash metal, as well as noise musical acts like Swans. The name derives from the fact that grind is a British term for thrash; that term was prepended to -core from hardcore. Grindcore relies on standard hardcore punk instrumentation: electric guitar, bass and drums. However, grindcore alters the usual practices of metal or rock music in regard to song structure and tone. The vocal style is "ranging from high-pitched shrieks to low, throat-shredding growls and barks." In some cases, no clear lyrics exist. Vocals may be used as merely an added sound effect, a common practice with bands such as the experimental and jazz-infused band Naked City.

A characteristic of some grindcore songs is the "microsong," lasting only a few seconds. In 2001, the Guinness Book of World Records awarded Brutal Truth the record for "Shortest Music Video" for 1994's "Collateral Damage" (the song lasts four seconds). In 2007, the video for the Napalm Death song "You Suffer" set a new "Shortest Music Video" record: 1.3 seconds. Beyond the microsong, it is characteristic of grindcore to have short songs in general; for example, Carcass' debut album Reek of Putrefaction (1988) consists of 22 tracks with an average length of 1 minute and 48 seconds. It is common for grindcore albums to be very short when compared to other genres, usually consisting of a large track list but having a total length of only 15 to 20 minutes.

Many grindcore groups experiment with tuned-down guitars and play mostly with downstrokes of the pick, power chords and heavy distortion. While the vinyl A-side of Napalm Death's debut, 1987's Scum, is set to Eb tuning, on side B, the guitars are tuned down to C. Their second album From Enslavement to Obliteration and the Mentally Murdered EP were tuned to C ♯. Harmony Corruption, their third full-length album, was tuned up to a D. Bolt Thrower went further, dropping 3½ steps down (A). The bass playing is often overdriven.

=== Blast beat ===
An example of a blast beat
A blast beat played at tempos of 124, 160, 200 and 240 bpm, respectively

The blast beat is a drum beat characteristic of grindcore in all its forms, although its usage predates the genre itself, in Adam MacGregor's definition, "the blast-beat generally comprises a repeated, sixteenth-note figure played at a very fast tempo, and divided uniformly among the kick drum, snare and ride, crash, or hi-hat cymbal." Blast beats have been described as "maniacal percussive explosions, less about rhythm per se than sheer sonic violence." Napalm Death coined the term, though this style of drumming had previously been practiced by others. Daniel Ekeroth argues that the blast beat was first performed by the Swedish group Asocial on their 1982 demo. Lärm ("Campaign For Musical Destruction") Dirty Rotten Imbeciles ("No Sense"), Stormtroopers of Death ("Milk"), Sarcófago ("Satanas"), Sepultura ("Antichrist"), and Repulsion also included the technique prior to Napalm Death's emergence.

=== Lyrical themes ===
Grindcore lyrics are typically provocative. A number of grindcore musicians are committed to political and ethical causes, generally leaning towards the far left in connection to grindcore's punk roots. For example, Napalm Death's songs address a variety of anarchist concerns, in the tradition of anarcho-punk. These themes include anti-racism, feminism, anti-militarism, and anti-capitalism. Early grindcore bands including Napalm Death, Agathocles and Carcass made animal rights one of their primary lyrical themes. Some of them, such as Cattle Decapitation and Carcass, have expressed disgust with human behavior and animal abuse, and are, in some cases, vegetarians or vegans. Carcass' work in particular is often identified as the origin of the goregrind style, which is devoted to "bodily" themes. Groups that shift their bodily focus to sexual matters, such as Gut and the Meat Shits, are sometimes referred to as pornogrind. Seth Putnam's lyrics are notorious for their black comedy, while The Locust tend toward satirical collage, indebted to William S. Burroughs' cut-up method.

== History ==
=== Precursors ===
The early grindcore scene relied on an international network of tape trading and DIY production. The most widely acknowledged precursors of the grindcore sound are Siege and Repulsion, an early death metal outfit. Siege, from Weymouth, Massachusetts, were influenced by classic American hardcore (Minor Threat, Black Flag, Void) and by British groups like Discharge, Venom, and Motörhead. Siege's goal was maximum velocity: "We would listen to the fastest punk and hardcore bands we could find and say, 'Okay, we're gonna deliberately write something that is faster than them'", drummer Robert Williams recalled. Repulsion is sometimes credited with inventing the classic grind blast beat (played at 190 bpm), as well as its distinctive bass tone. Kevin Sharp of Brutal Truth declares that "Horrified was and still is the defining core of what grind became; a perfect mix of hardcore punk with metallic gore, speed and distortion." Writer Freddy Alva credited NYC Mayhem as a notable precursor, calling them "arguably one of the fastest bands on the planet back [in the mid 1980s]".

Other groups in the British grindcore scene, such as Heresy and Unseen Terror, have emphasized the influence of American hardcore punk, including Septic Death, as well as Swedish D-beat. Sore Throat cites Discharge, Disorder, and a variety of European D-beat and thrash metal groups, including Hellhammer, and American hardcore groups, such as Poison Idea and D.R.I. Japanese hardcore, particularly GISM, is also mentioned by a number of originators of the style. Other key groups cited by current and former members of Napalm Death as formative influences include Discharge, Amebix, Throbbing Gristle, and the aforementioned Dirty Rotten Imbeciles. Post-punk, such as Killing Joke and Joy Division, was also cited as an influence on early Napalm Death.

=== British grindcore ===
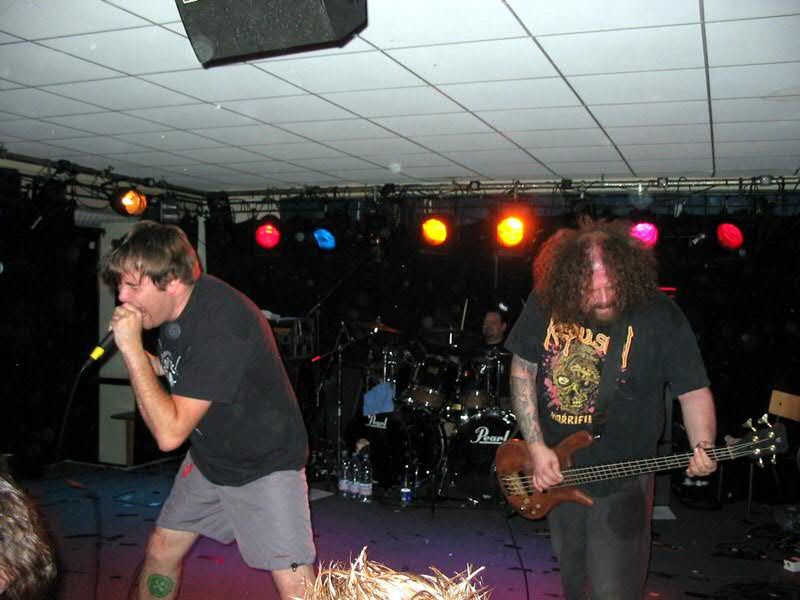
Grindcore pioneers Napalm Death in a 2007 show

External videos
- Napalm Death live in Germany, 1987, from YouTube, authorized by Earache Records.

Grindcore, as such, was developed during the mid-1980s in the United Kingdom by Napalm Death, a group who emerged from the anarcho-punk scene in Birmingham, England. While their first recordings were in the vein of Crass, they eventually became associated with crust punk, The group began to take on increasing elements of thrashcore, post-punk, and power electronics, and began describing their sound as "Siege with Celtic Frost riffs". The group also went through many changes in personnel. A major shift in style took place after Mick Harris became the group's drummer. Punk historian Ian Glasper indicates that "For several months gob-smacked audiences weren't sure whether Napalm Death were actually a serious band any longer, such was the undeniable novelty of their hyper-speed new drummer." Albert Mudrian's research suggests that the name "grindcore" was coined by Harris. When asked about coming up with the term, Harris said:

Grindcore came from "grind", which was the only word I could use to describe Swans after buying their first record in '84. Then with this new hardcore movement that started to really blossom in '85, I thought "grind" really fit because of the speed so I started to call it grindcore.

Other sources contradict Harris' claim. In a Spin magazine article written about the genre, Steven Blush declares that "the man often credited" for dubbing the style grindcore was Shane Embury, Napalm Death's bassist since 1987. Embury offers his own account of how the grindcore "sound" came to be:

As far as how this whole sound got started, we were really into Celtic Frost, Siege – which is a hardcore band from Boston – a lot of hardcore and death-metal bands, and some industrial-noise bands like the early Swans. So, we just created a mesh of all those things. It's just everything going at a hundred miles per hour, basically.

Earache Records founder Digby Pearson concurs with Embury, saying that Napalm Death "put hardcore and metal through an accelerator." Pearson, however, said that grindcore "wasn't just about the speed of [the] drums, blast beats, etc." He claimed that "it actually was coined to describe the guitars – heavy, downtuned, bleak, harsh riffing guitars [that] 'grind', so that's what the genre was described as, by the musicians who were its innovators [and] proponents."

While abrasive, grindcore achieved a measure of mainstream visibility. New Musical Express featured Napalm Death on their cover in 1988, declaring them "the fastest band in the world." As James Hoare, deputy editor of Terrorizer, writes:

It can be argued that no strand of extreme metal (with a touch of hardcore and post-punk tossed in for flavouring), has had so big an impact outside the gated community of patch-jackets and circle-pits as grindcore has in the UK. [...] the genre is a part of the British musical experience.

Napalm Death's seismic impact inspired other British grindcore groups in the 1980s, among them Extreme Noise Terror, Carcass and Sore Throat. Extreme Noise Terror, from Ipswich, formed in 1984. With the goal of becoming "the most extreme hardcore punk band of all time," the group took Mick Harris from Napalm Death in 1987. Ian Glasper describes the group as "pissed-off hateful noise with its roots somewhere between early Discharge and Disorder, with [vocalists] Dean [Jones] and Phil [Vane] pushing their trademark vocal extremity to its absolute limit." In 1991, the group collaborated with the acid house group The KLF, appearing onstage with the group at the Brit Awards in 1992. Carcass released Reek of Putrefaction in 1988, which John Peel declared his favorite album of the year despite its very poor production. The band's focus on gore and anatomical decay, lyrically and in sleeve artwork, inspired the goregrind subgenre. Sore Throat, said by Ian Glasper to have taken "perhaps the most uncompromisingly anti-music stance" were inspired by crust punk as well as industrial music. Some listeners, such as Digby Pearson, considered them to be simply an in-joke or parody of grindcore.

In the subsequent decade, two pioneers of the style became increasingly commercially viable. According to Nielsen Soundscan, Napalm Death sold 367,654 units between May 1991 and November 2003, while Carcass sold 220,374 units in the same period. The inclusion of Napalm Death's "Twist the Knife (Slowly)" on the Mortal Kombat soundtrack brought the band much greater visibility, as the compilation scored a Top 10 position in the Billboard 200 chart and went platinum in less than a year. The originators of the style have expressed some ambivalence regarding the subsequent popularity of grindcore. Pete Hurley, the guitarist of Extreme Noise Terror, declared that he had no interest in being remembered as a pioneer of this style: "grindcore was a legendarily stupid term coined by a hyperactive kid from the West Midlands, and it had nothing to do with us whatsoever. ENT were, are, and – I suspect – always will be a hardcore punk band... not a grindcore band, a stenchcore band, a trampcore band, or any other sub-sub-sub-core genre-defining term you can come up with." Lee Dorrian of Napalm Death indicated that "Unfortunately, I think the same thing happened to grindcore, if you want to call it that, as happened to punk rock – all the great original bands were just plagiarised by a billion other bands who just copied their style identically, making it no longer original and no longer extreme."

=== North American grindcore ===
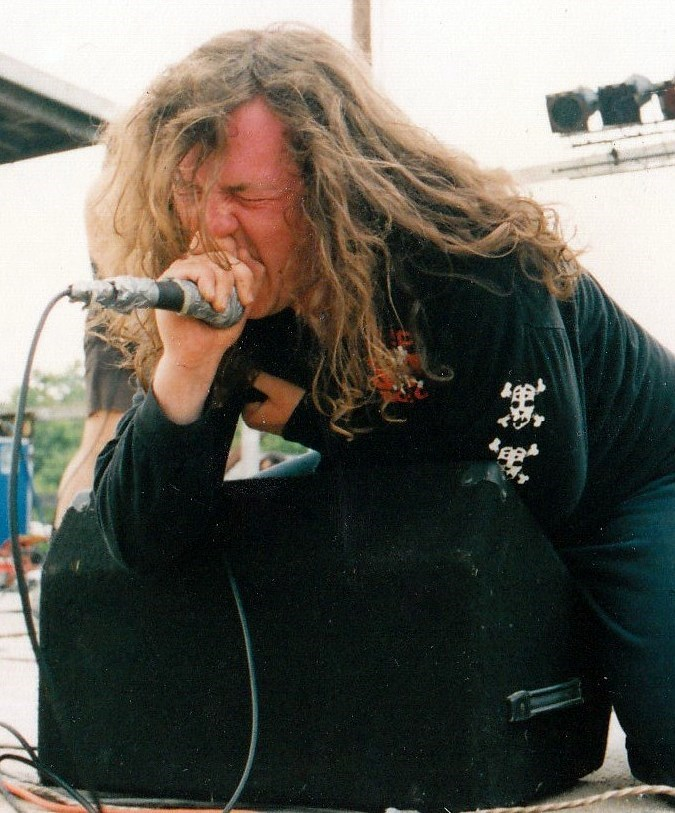
Seth Putnam of Anal Cunt at Relapse Festival, 1993

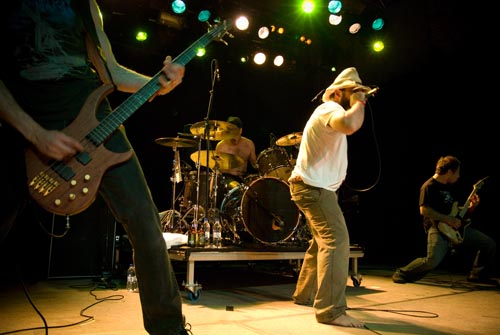
Brutal Truth live at Hole In The Sky, Bergen Metal Fest 2008

Journalist Kevin Stewart-Panko argues that the American grindcore of the 1990s borrowed from three sources: British grindcore, the American precursors, and death metal. As early Napalm Death albums were not widely distributed in the United States, American groups tended to take inspiration from later works, such as Harmony Corruption. American groups also often employ riffs taken from crossover thrash or thrash metal. Early American grind practitioners included Terrorizer and Assück. Anal Cunt, a particularly dissonant group who lacked a bass player, were also particularly influential. Their style was sometimes referred to as "noisecore" or "noisegrind", described by Giulio of Cripple Bastards as "the most anti-musical and nihilistic face of extreme music at that time." Brutal Truth was a groundbreaking group in the American scene at the beginning of the 1990s.

However, Sharp indicates that they were more inspired by the thrash metal of Dark Angel than the British groups. Discordance Axis had a more technical style of playing than many of the predecessors, and had a much more ornate visual and production style. Scott Hull is prominent in the contemporary grindcore scene, through his participation in Pig Destroyer and Agoraphobic Nosebleed. ANb's Frozen Corpse Stuffed with Dope has been described as "the Paul's Boutique of grindcore", by Village Voice critic Phil Freeman, for its "hyper-referential, impossibly dense barrage of samples, blast beats, answering machine messages, and incomprehensibly bellowed rants." Pig Destroyer is inspired by thrash metal, such as Dark Angel and Slayer, the sludge metal of the Melvins, and grindcore practiced by Brutal Truth, while Agoraphobic Nosebleed takes cues from thrashcore and powerviolence, like D.R.I. and Crossed Out.

External videos
- Pig Destroyer's "Gravedancer", from YouTube, authorized by Relapse Records.

The Locust, from San Diego, also take inspiration from powerviolence (Crossed Out, Dropdead), first-wave screamo (Angel Hair), obscure experimental rock (Art Bears, Renaldo and the Loaf), and death metal. The Locust were sometimes described as "hipster grind" because of their fan base and fashion choices. In Los Angeles, Hole also initially drew influence from grindcore in their early releases, particularly on their singles "Dicknail" and "Teenage Whore", as well as on their debut album, Pretty on the Inside (1991), all of which featured sexually provocative and violent lyrics, as well as the heavy distortion and fluctuating tempo that distinguished the genre. Frontwoman Courtney Love stated that she wanted to capture the distinguishing elements of grindcore while incorporating more pop-based melodic structure, although the band distanced themselves from the style in their later releases.

Other later prominent grindcore groups of North America include Brujeria, Soilent Green, Cephalic Carnage, Impetigo, and Circle of Dead Children. Fuck the Facts, a Canadian group, practice classic grindcore, characterized by the "metronome-precision drumming and riffing [that] abound, as well as vocal screams and growls" by AllMusic reviewer Greg Prato.

=== Continental European grindcore ===
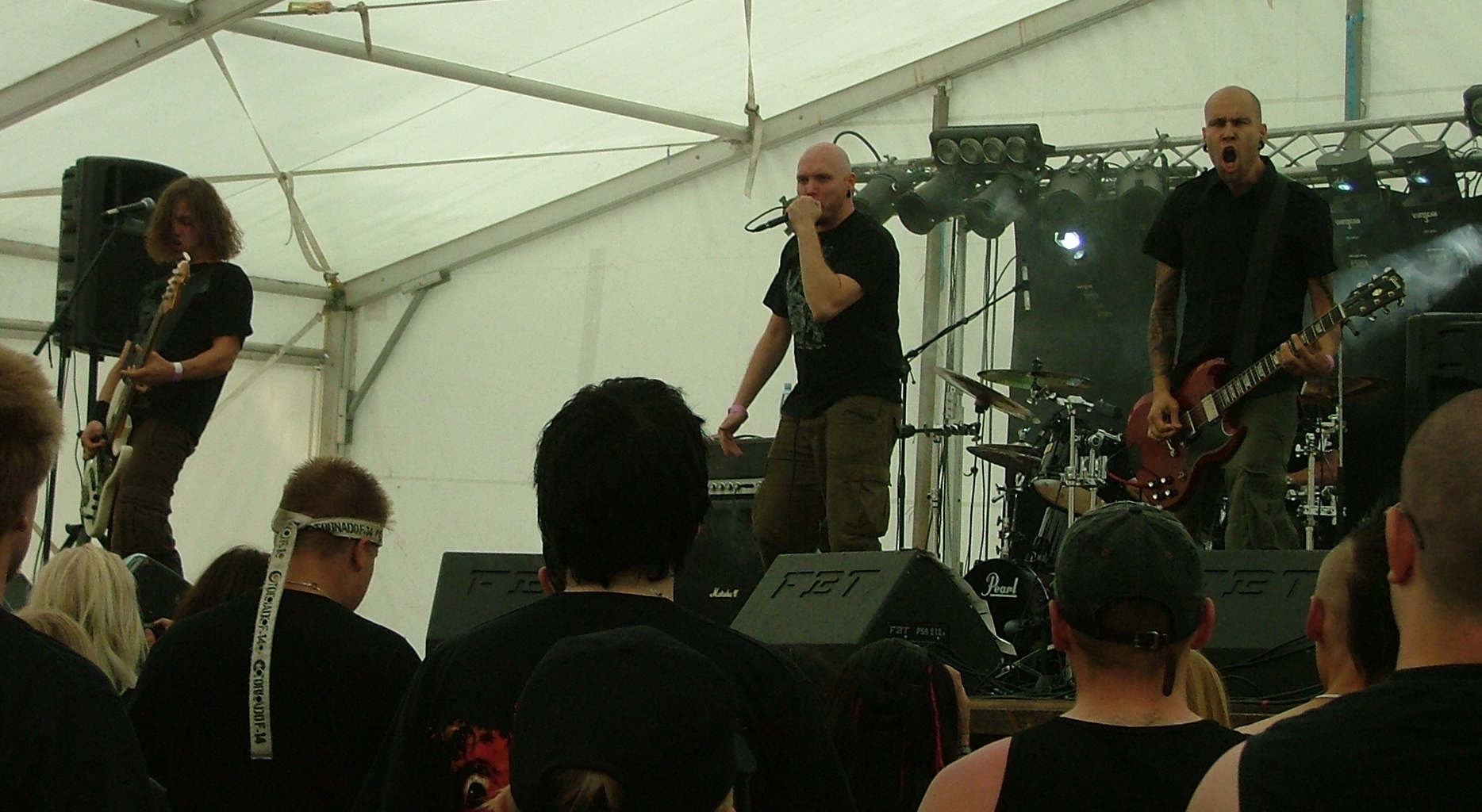
Finnish grindcore group Rotten Sound performing in Kuopio in 2008

European groups, such as Agathocles, from Belgium, Patareni, of Croatia, and Fear of God, from Switzerland, are important early practitioners of the style. Filthy Christians, who signed to Earache Records in 1989, introduced the style in Sweden, D.D.T. & Fear of Dog were pioneering grind & noise in Serbia since mid-end of '80, Extreme Smoke 57 in Slovenia at the early beginning of the '90, while Cripple Bastards established Italian grindcore. Giulio of Cripple Bastards asserts that the name itself took some time to migrate from Britain, with the style being referred to as "death-thrashcore" for a time in Europe. Nasum, who emerged from the Swedish death metal scene, became a popular group, addressing political topics from a personal perspective.

Anders Jakobson, their drummer, reported that "It was all these different types of people who enjoyed what we were doing. [...] We made grindcore a bit easier to listen to at the expense of the diehard grindcore fans who thought that we were, well, not sellouts, but not really true to the original essence of grindcore." Other Swedish groups, such as General Surgery and Regurgitate, practiced goregrind. Inhume, from the Netherlands, Rotten Sound, from Finland, and Leng Tch'e, from Belgium, were subsequent European groups who practiced grindcore with death metal inflections. In 2000s, the Belgium-based Aborted "had grown into the role of key contributors to the death-grind genres".

=== Grindcore in Asian countries ===
In 2010, Singaporean band Wormrot signed a recording contract with Earache Records.

In 2019, Filipino band Tubero signed a recording contract with Tower of Doom Records.

== Influence ==
Japanese noise rock group Boredoms have borrowed elements of grind, and toured with Brutal Truth in 1993. The Japanese grindcore group Gore Beyond Necropsy formed in 1989, and later collaborated with noise music artist Merzbow. Naked City, led by avant-garde jazz saxophonist John Zorn, performed an avant-garde form of polystylistic, grindcore-influenced punk jazz. Zorn later formed the Painkiller project with ambient dub producer Bill Laswell on bass guitar and Mick Harris on drums, which also collaborated with Justin Broadrick on some work. In addition, grindcore was one influence on the powerviolence movement within American hardcore punk, and has affected some strains of metalcore. Some musicians have also produced hybrids between grind and electronic music.

=== Powerviolence ===
Powerviolence is a raw and dissonant subgenre of hardcore punk. The style is closely related to thrashcore and similar to grindcore. While powerviolence took inspiration from Napalm Death and other early grind bands, powerviolence groups avoided elements of heavy metal. Its nascent form was pioneered in the late 1980s in the music of hardcore punk band Infest, who mixed youth crew hardcore elements with noisier, sludgier qualities of Lärm and Siege. The microgenre solidified into its most commonly recognized form in the early 1990s, with the sounds of bands such as Man Is the Bastard, Crossed Out, No Comment, Capitalist Casualties, and Manpig.

Powerviolence bands focus on speed, brevity, bizarre timing breakdowns, and constant tempo changes. Powerviolence songs are often very short; it is not uncommon for some to last less than 30 seconds. Some groups, particularly Man Is the Bastard, took influence from sludge metal and noise music. Lyrically and conceptually, powerviolence groups were very raw and underproduced, both sonically and in their packaging. Some groups (Man Is the Bastard, Azucares, Capitalist Casualties, and Dropdead) took influence from anarcho-punk and crust punk, emphasizing animal rights and anti-militarism. The Locust and Agoraphobic Nosebleed later reincorporated elements of powerviolence into grindcore.

=== Industrial and electronic influence ===
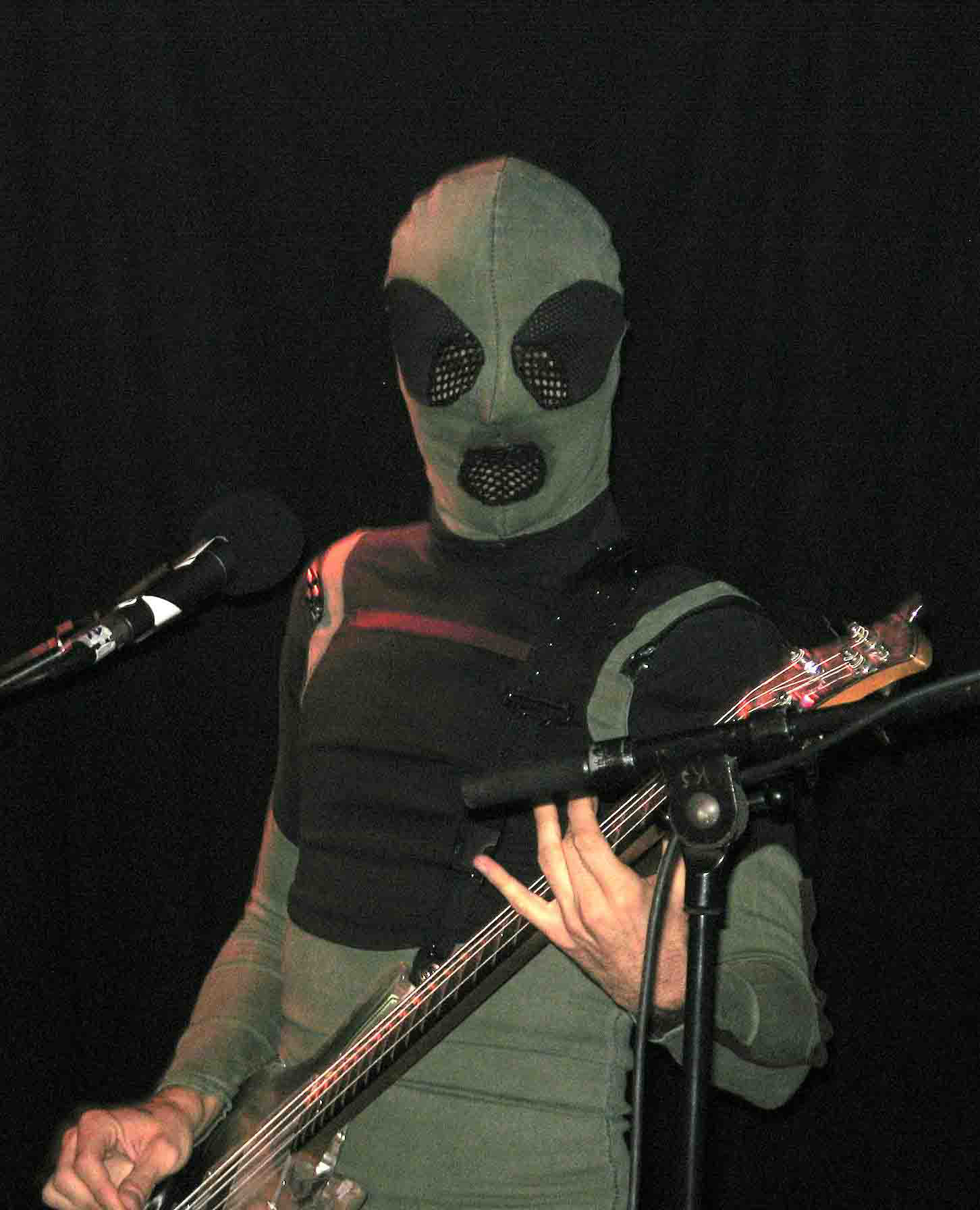
Justin Pearson of The Locust, originators of electrogrind

Among other influences, Napalm Death took impetus from the industrial music scene. Subsequently, Napalm Death's former guitarist, Justin Broadrick, went on to a career in industrial metal with Godflesh. Mick Harris, in his post-Napalm Death project, Scorn, briefly experimented with the style. Scorn also worked in the industrial hip hop and isolationist styles. Fear Factory have also cited debts to the genre. Digital hardcore is an initially German hybrid of hardcore punk and hardcore techno. Agoraphobic Nosebleed and the Locust have solicited remixes from digital hardcore producers and noise musicians. James Plotkin, Dave Witte, and Speedranch participated in the Phantomsmasher project, which melds grindcore and digital hardcore. Alec Empire collaborated with Justin Broadrick, on the first Curse of the Golden Vampire album, and with Gabe Serbian, of the Locust, live in Japan. Japanoise icon Merzbow also participated in the Empire/Serbian show.

==== Cybergrind ====
The 21st century also saw the emergence of cybergrind (also known as "electrogrind"), which borrows from electronic music. The earliest bands of the genre include Agoraphobic Nosebleed and Gigantic Brain. Other notable acts include The Berzerker and Genghis Tron. These groups built on the sound of Enemy Soil and The Locust, as well as industrial metal. The Berzerker also appropriated the distorted Roland TR-909 kick drums of gabber producers. Many later electrogrind groups were caricatured for their hipster connections.

=== Mathcore and screamo ===
In the mid-1990s, mathcore groups such as The Dillinger Escape Plan, Some Girls, and Daughters began to take inspiration from developments in grindcore. These groups also include elements of post-hardcore. In addition to mathcore, some early screamo groups, like Circle Takes the Square and Orchid, have been associated with grindcore by some commentators.

=== Crust punk ===
Crust punk had a major impact on grindcore's emergence. The first grindcore, practiced by British bands such as Napalm Death, Extreme Noise Terror and Disrupt emerged from the crust punk scene. This early style is sometimes dubbed "crustgrind".

=== Deathgrind ===
Deathgrind is a shorthand term that is used to describe bands who play a fusion of death metal and grindcore. With growing popularity of grindcore in the metal fandom, some death metal bands were noted to feature a heavy amount of grindcore influence; thus, these bands ended up becoming called "deathgrind" for short (sometimes written as death-grind or death/grind). Dan Lilker described deathgrind as "combining the technicality of death metal with the intensity of grindcore." Some examples of death metal and grindcore hybrids include Assück, Circle of Dead Children, Misery Index, Exhumed, Gorerotted and Cattle Decapitation. Assück in particular has been credited as one of the earliest deathgrind acts.

=== Blackened grindcore ===
Blackened grindcore is a fusion genre that combines elements of black metal and grindcore. Notable bands include Anaal Nathrakh and early Rotting Christ.

=== Noisegrind ===
Noisegrind (also known as grindnoise) is a microgenre that combines elements of grindcore and harsh noise. Notable bands include Holy Grinder, Sete Star Sept, Full of Hell, Fear of God, Insufferable, and early Knelt Rote.

== See also ==
- List of grindcore bands
- Napalm Death: Thrash to Death (BBC documentary)
- Animal rights and punk subculture
