= I Cum Blood =

Song by Cannibal Corpse

from the album Tomb of the Mutilated
- Released: September 1992
- Studio: Morrisound Recording
- Genre: Death metal
- Length: 3:42
- Label: Metal Blade Records
- Composers: Jack Owen, Paul Mazurkiewicz
- Lyricist: Chris Barnes
- Producer: Scott Burns

"I Cum Blood" is a song by American death metal band Cannibal Corpse. It is the second track from their third studio album Tomb of the Mutilated, released in 1992.

The track is almost always included in the band's live sets. The song is also routinely mentioned in conversations regarding the band's controversial song titles from early in their career.

== Lyrics ==
The song is noted for its extremely perverse subject matter, which explores themes including mutilation and sexual violence. Loudwire stated that "the song’s title leaves nothing to the imagination." OC Weekly called the song "disgustingly gross", and advised the listener against reading the lyrics altogether. Metal Hammer said the track contained "eye-watering horror", and arts/culture magazine Vice called the lyrics "colorful". PopMatters called the title "jaw-dropping".

== In popular culture ==
The song is featured in Grand Theft Auto IV on the Liberty City hardcore punk radio station. Phoenix New Times wrote: "I challenge you to hear the intro to this song and not immediately want to start driving at full speed into an entire sidewalk of pedestrians. The only real shame is that the song didn’t carry on when you bailed out the car to start flinging grenades at them."
