= Albert Mudrian =

Albert Mudrian (born 1975) is an author who has written and edited several music history books, including Choosing Death and Precious Metal. He is the editor-in-chief for Decibel. In 2021, he collaborated with Metal Blade Records on the 15th edition of the Metal Massacrecompilation. He stated that he and Swiss author Ian Christe had once had talks of writing a book about late Death frontman Chuck Schuldiner together in 2013, but this ultimately never came into fruition.
