= Hammer Smashed Face (song) =

Song by Cannibal Corpse

from the album Tomb of the Mutilated
- Released: 1992
- Studio: Morrisound Recording
- Genre: Death metal
- Label: Metal Blade Records
- Composers: Alex Webster, Paul Mazurkiewicz, Jack Owen
- Lyricist: Chris Barnes
- Producer: Scott Burns

"Hammer Smashed Face" is a song by American death metal band Cannibal Corpse, released in 1992 as the opening track on their third studio album Tomb of the Mutilated.

Many consider it to be the band's greatest song, as well as being among the greatest and most defining death metal songs of all time.

== Composition and lyrics ==
According to Loudersound, "The song is notorious for its pummelling and rhythmic start, where Paul’s quick yet primal drumbeats give way to a brief, bass guitar-led interlude, all before a gigantic and climactic breakdown."

The song's main riff has been called "hauntingly sinister." The song's breakdown has been called "clobbering" and "stomach churning." Revolver said the "lyrical specificity of a madman bashing a victim’s head to bits can still make even the most hardened headbanger squirm."

Drummer Paul Mazurkiewicz has commented that the lyrics to "Hammer Smashed Face" are "mild" compared to the rest of the tracks on Tomb of the Mutilated.

== Reception and legacy ==
"Hammer Smashed Face" is the band's most popular song, mainly due to a shortened version appearing in the 1994 comedy film Ace Ventura: Pet Detective. Since it is included on Tomb of the Mutilated, it was banned from Germany until June 2006, when it was played at a 2006 performance at Essen.

In 2012, Loudwire wrote: "Easily one of the best death metal songs ever written, the track tends to often overshadow the mastery heard on the rest of the album." In 2015, the same publication stated that it was the best Cannibal Corpse song. In 2023, Rolling Stone ranked the song No. 93 on their list of the 100 greatest heavy metal songs. Revolver called it "the perfect death metal song." Graham Hartmann of Loudwire called the change to half-time in the song's middle section "one of the most stomach churning breakdowns ever recorded."
