= Decibel (magazine) =

US music magazine

- December 2006 issue with Converge
- Editor-in-chief: Albert Mudrian
- Categories: Music
- Frequency: Monthly
- Publisher: Alex Mulcahy
- First issue: October 2004
- Company: Red Flag Media Inc.
- Country: United States
- Based in: Philadelphia, Pennsylvania
- Language: English
- Website: decibelmagazine.com
- ISSN: 1557-2137

Decibel is a monthly heavy metal magazine published by the Philadelphia-based Red Flag Media since September 2004. It is currently the only monthly metal music magazine published in North America. Its sections include Upfront, Features, Reviews, Guest Columns and the Decibel Hall of Fame. The magazine's tag-line is currently "Extremely Extreme" (previously "The New Noise"); the editor-in-chief is Albert Mudrian.

== History ==
Decibel was first conceived in late 2003 by journalist Albert Mudrian (born 1975), around the time he was finishing his book Choosing Death: The Improbable History of Death Metal & Grindcore (2004). Mudrian had previously written in a number of magazines published by the Philadelphia-based Red Flag Media, who he joined in 1997, and felt that there was "a market in the United States for a metal magazine that covered extreme music the way that magazines like Spin used to cover pop music and culture". Mudrian brainstormed some ideas for the magazine with former Terrorizer editor Nick Terry, whom he first contacted in 2002 to write the foreword for Choosing Death. The magazine's original title was Powertrip (after Monster Magnet's song and album); Terry pushed for naming it Sabotage (after the Beastie Boys song), though his idea was scrapped in light of the September 11 attacks. In a 2007 interview, Mudrian and writer Nick Green cited Terrorizer as an influence on Decibel's content and editorial style, although Mudrian felt that overall it drew more from his previous publications for Red Flag Media. Terry also felt that Alternative Press was "a possible deep-background influence" on the magazine and some of its writers.

Decibel was officially launched in July 2004, with its initial lineup of journalists including Terry, Aaron Burgess, Iann Robinson and Kevin Stewart-Panko. The magazine's first issue, featuring The Dillinger Escape Plan on the cover, was published on September 4, 2004, with an initial circulation of 30,000 copies. In December, the Dillinger Escape Plan's second album Miss Machine was crowned "Album of the Year" for 2004 in the magazine's first ever critics' poll.

On August 31, 2024, Decibel will hold a 20th Anniversary Show at the Brooklyn Bowl in Philadelphia, featuring Autopsy, Horrendous, Immolation, Krieg, Rid of Me, Deathevokation, Ecdysis and Crypt Sermon.

== Features ==
=== Hall of Fame ===
Each issue of Decibel features an article dubbed the Hall of Fame which pays tribute to a significant album in the history of heavy metal music. All contributing band members to the specific album must be alive at the time of interviewing. It was started in 2004 with the first ever inductee being Slayer's Reign in Blood. According to Albert Mudrian in the book Precious Metal, he conceptualized the Hall of Fame "as a nice excuse for us to revisit some of our favorite records in the magazine."

In 2009, 25 of the Hall of Fame entries were used as the basis for the book Precious Metal: Decibel Presents the Stories Behind 25 Extreme Metal Masterpieces released through Da Capo Press. The book also includes previously unreleased interview questions that were left out of the magazine articles, and a full piece on Darkthrone's Transilvanian Hunger that was never published in a magazine due to its length.

=== Flexi Series ===
In November 2010, the magazine announced the launch of the monthly Decibel Flexi Series. Beginning with the January 2011 issue (#75), the magazine now includes a limited vinyl flexi disc bound into the magazine each month available exclusively to its subscribers.

== Tour ==
Beginning in 2012, Decibel has put on an annual tour in the US and Canada. According to metal blog No Clean Singing, typically the tour is headlined by a seasoned death metal or black metal band and includes three supporting acts: a "hard-touring band with a dependable legion of fans"; a "critical darling band in search of a wider audience, one that Decibel Magazine has put a lot of page space into supporting"; and a "pit-friendly band with connections to the metal underground, one early in their career and sporting a charismatic frontman". Some dates of the tour also include local openers.

Decibel Tour 2012

- Behemoth - Watain - The Devils Blood - In Solitude

Decibel Tour 2013

- Cannibal Corpse - Napalm Death - Immolation

Rotating Openers - Magrudergrind - Cretin - Beyond Creation

Decibel Tour 2014

- Carcass - The Black Dahlia Murder - Gorguts - Noisem

Decibel 2015

- At The Gates - Converge - Pallbearer - Vallenfyre

Decibel Tour 2016

- Abbath - High On Fire - Skeletonwitch - Tribulation

Decibel Tour 2017

- Kreator - Obituary - Midnight - Horrendous

Decibel Tour 2018

- Enslaved - Wolves In The Throne Room - Myrkur - Khemmis

Decibel Tour 2019

- Cannibal Corpse (Feb 17-Mar 7) - Morbid Angel - Immolation (Mar 8-Mar 14) - Necrot - Blood Incantation

Decibel Tour 2020 (CANCELED DUE TO COVID-19)

- Mayhem - Abbath - Gatecreeper - Idle Hands

Decibel Tour 2022

- Obituary - Municipal Waste - Gatecreeper - Enforced - Spirit World

Decibel Tour 2023

- Dark Funeral - Cattle Decapitation - 200 Stab Wounds - Blackbraid

Decibel Tour 2024

- Hulder - Devil Master - Worm - Necrofier

Decibel Tour 2025

- Mayhem - Mortiis - Imperial Triumphant - New Skeletal Faces

== See also ==
- Precious Metal, a 2009 music history book written by Decibel editor-in-chief Albert Mudrian
