= Cannibal Corpse discography =

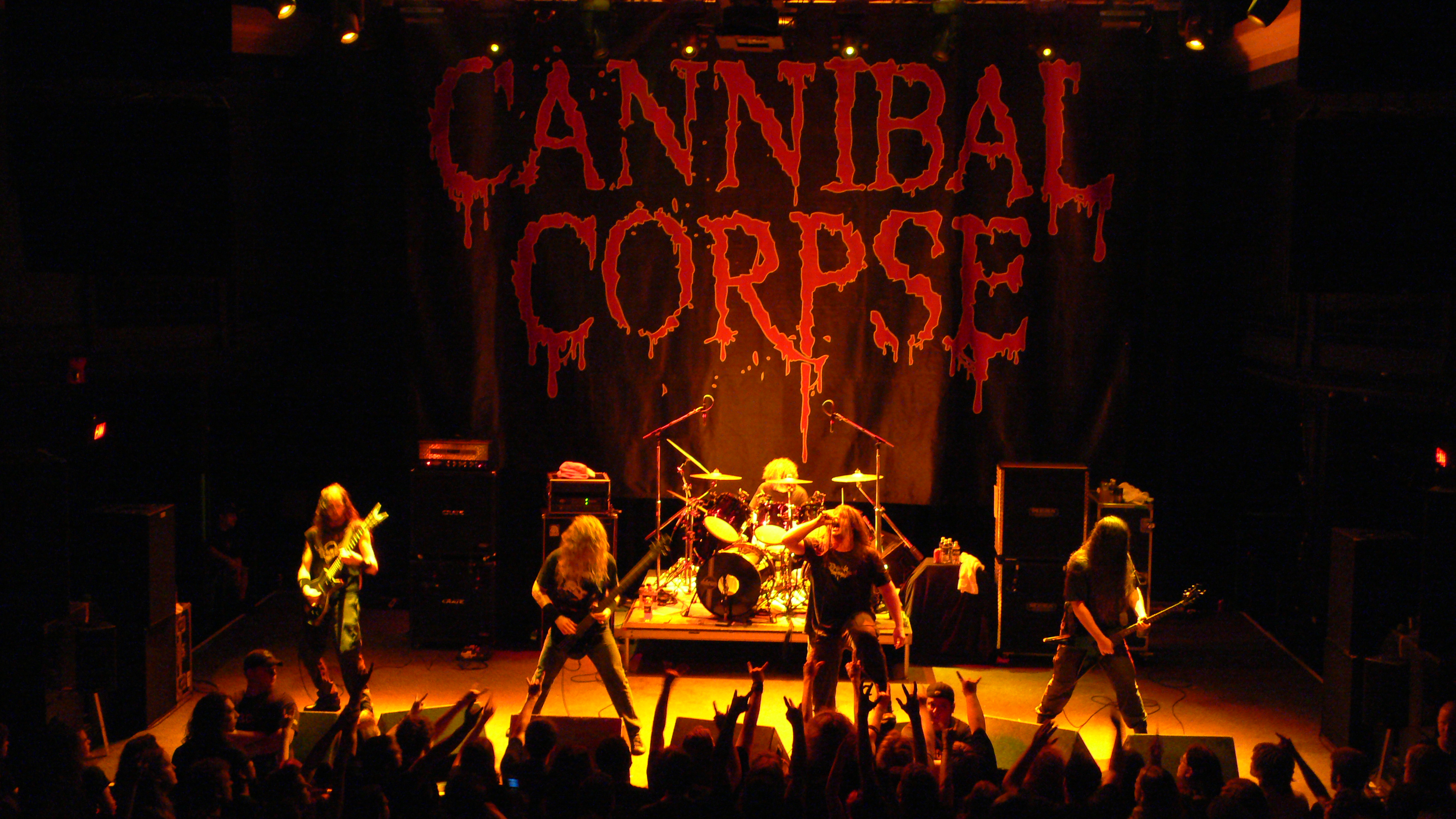
- Cannibal Corpse live at the 9:30 Club in 2007
- Studio albums: 16
- Extended plays: 2
- Live albums: 2
- Video albums: 4
- Music videos: 12
- Box sets: 1

Cannibal Corpse is a five-piece American death metal band formed in 1988 in Buffalo, New York. In 1989, their self-titled demo drew the attention of Metal Blade Records, with whom they signed a contract to record their debut album Eaten Back to Life, which was released in 1990, followed by two studio albums, 1991's Butchered at Birth, and 1992's Tomb of the Mutilated. In 1993, lead guitarist Bob Rusay was fired, and was replaced by Rob Barrett, who joined the group in time to appear with the band in Jim Carrey's film Ace Ventura: Pet Detective.

In 1994, they released The Bleeding, the debut record with Barrett, and the last album with vocalist Chris Barnes, who left the band to concentrate on his side project Six Feet Under. Then, Monstrosity vocalist George "Corpsegrinder" Fisher took over as vocalist, with whom the band released Vile in 1996, resulting as the band's first album to appear on the Billboard 200 chart, debuting at number 151. On the next album, 1998's Gallery of Suicide, Rob Barrett was replaced by Pat O'Brien. In 1999, they released Bloodthirst, followed by the group's first live album, Live Cannibalism (2000). Gore Obsessed was released in 2002, followed by the boxed set 15 Year Killing Spree, a four-disc career retrospective, that was released in 2003. The ninth album The Wretched Spawn, was released in 2004, followed by Kill in 2006, which appeared on the Billboard 200 chart at number 170.

In between The Wretched Spawn and Kill, founding guitarist Jack Owen left the band, being replaced by former Cannibal Corpse and Malevolent Creation guitarist Rob Barrett, who had played with the band from 1993 until 1997. As of 2008, their latest release is the DVD Centuries of Torment: The First 20 Years, containing a three-disc documentary with the band's history and several concert performances. In 2009, Evisceration Plague became their first release to crack the Top 100 of the Billboard 200 at number 66. Torture was released in 2012. It sold 9,600 copies in its first week, enough to enter the top 40 on the American albums chart, peaking at 38. A Skeletal Domain was released in 2014. It sold 8,800 copies in its first week and hit 32 on the Billboard 200. Red Before Black was released in 2017.

Cannibal Corpse received its best sales week yet and first top 10 on Billboard Top Album Sales as Violence Unimagined entered at No. 6 with 14,000 sold in April 2021.

== Albums ==
=== Studio albums ===
List of studio albums, with selected chart positions
Title	Album details	Peak chart positions										
Title	Album details	US	US Ind.	AUS	AUT	BEL (WA)	FIN	GER	JPN	SWI	UK	UK Rock and Metal
Eaten Back to Life	Released: August 17, 1990; Label: Metal Blade	—	—	192	—	—	—	—	—	—	—	—
Butchered at Birth	Released: July 1, 1991; Label: Metal Blade	—	—	192	—	—	—	—	—	—	—	—
Tomb of the Mutilated	Released: September 22, 1992; Label: Metal Blade	—	—	182	—	—	—	—	—	—	—	—
The Bleeding	Released: April 12, 1994; Label: Metal Blade	—	—	169	—	—	—	—	—	—	—	—
Vile	Released: May 21, 1996; Label: Metal Blade	151	—	182	—	—	—	—	—	—	—	—
Gallery of Suicide	Released: April 21, 1998; Label: Metal Blade	—	—	—	—	—	—	—	—	—	—	—
Bloodthirst	Released: October 19, 1999; Label: Metal Blade	—	—	—	—	—	—	—	—	—	—	—
Gore Obsessed	Released: February 26, 2002; Label: Metal Blade	—	11	—	—	—	—	71	—	—	—	—
The Wretched Spawn	Released: February 24, 2004; Label: Metal Blade	—	20	—	—	—	—	74	—	—	—	—
Kill	Released: March 21, 2006; Label: Metal Blade	170	16	—	—	—	—	59	—	—	—	36
Evisceration Plague	Released: February 3, 2009; Label: Metal Blade	66	6	—	41	71	25	42	—	—	—	17
Torture	Released: March 13, 2012; Label: Metal Blade	38	7	—	40	95	35	40	—	72	126	5
A Skeletal Domain	Released: September 16, 2014; Label: Metal Blade	32	5	—	28	128	26	21	129	50	165	6
Red Before Black	Released: November 3, 2017; Label: Metal Blade	95	4	—	29	70	33	16	—	29	—	8
Violence Unimagined	Released: April 16, 2021; Label: Metal Blade	45	5	28	5	101	12	6	105	7	81	4
Chaos Horrific	Released: September 22, 2023; Label: Metal Blade	142	26	120	13	—	22	6	—	10	—	1
"—" denotes a recording that did not chart or was not released in that territory.

=== Live albums ===
List of live albums, with selected details
Title	Album details
Live Cannibalism	Released: September 16, 2000; Label: Metal Blade (#3984-14303-2); Formats: CD
Global Evisceration	Released: April 5, 2011; Label: Metal Blade; Formats: CD
Torturing and Eviscerating Live	Released: April 16, 2013; Label: Metal Blade; Formats: Digital

=== Box sets ===
List of box sets, with selected details and notes
Title	Album details	Notes
15 Year Killing Spree	Released: November 4, 2003; Label: Metal Blade (#3984-14449-2); Formats: 3CD	Released as four-disc boxed set (three CDs and one DVD), celebrating the 15th anniversary

== Extended plays ==
List of extended plays, with selected details
Title	EP details
Hammer Smashed Face	Released: March 23, 1993; Label: Metal Blade (ZORRO #57); Format: CD, LP
Worm Infested	Released: July 1, 2003; Label: Metal Blade (#3984-14432-2); Format: CD, LP

== Videos ==
=== Video albums ===
List of video albums, with selected details, chart positions, sales and certifications
Title	Album details	Peak chart positions		Sales	Certifications
Title	Album details	US	SWE	Sales	Certifications
Monolith of Death Tour '96–'97	Released: November 25, 1997; Label: Metal Blade (#3984-14302-2); Formats: VHS, DVD	32	—		
Live Cannibalism	Released: September 16, 2000; Label: Metal Blade (#3984-14303-2); Formats: VHS, DVD	—	—		
Centuries of Torment: The First 20 Years	Released: July 8, 2008; Label: Metal Blade (#3984-34054-2); Formats: DVD	8	—	US: 2,100	CAN: Platinum
Global Evisceration	Released: March 15, 2011; Label: Metal Blade (#3984-34063-9); Formats: DVD	17	8	US: 900	
"—" denotes releases that did not chart or were not released in that country.

=== Music videos ===
List of music videos, with director listed
Title	Year	Director
"Staring Through the Eyes of the Dead"	1994	David Roth
"Devoured by Vermin"	1996	David Roth
"Sentenced to Burn"	1998	David Roth
"Decency Defied"	2004	Austin Rhodes
"Make Them Suffer"	2006	Dan Dobi
"Death Walking Terror"	2006	Dan Dobi
"Evisceration Plague"	2009	Dale Resteghini
"Priests of Sodom"	2010	Kevin J. Custer
"Encased in Concrete"	2012	David Brodsky
"Kill or Become"	2014	David Brodsky
"Code of the Slashers"	2017	Zev Deans
"Red Before Black"	2019	Doug Sakmann
"Inhumane Harvest"	2021	David Brodsky
"Necrogenic Resurrection"	2021	David Brodsky
"Blood Blind"	2023	David Brodsky
"Summoned for Sacrifice"	2023	David Brodsky
"Chaos Horrific"	2023	David Brodsky
"Vengeful Invasion"	2024	Zev Deans
