= Scourge of Iron =

Song by Cannibal Corpse

from the album Torture
- Released: February 6, 2012
- Genre: Death metal
- Length: 4:44
- Label: Metal Blade Records
- Composer: Alex Webster
- Lyricist: Alex Webster
- Producer: Erik Rutan

"Scourge of Iron" is a song by American death metal band Cannibal Corpse from their twelfth studio album Torture. A fan favorite from the band's middle discography, the track became a staple of the band's live sets shortly after it was released.

== Composition and lyrics ==
"Scourge of Iron" is a slower track in the band's recorded catalog. Cannibal Corpse bassist Alex Webster composed the track. He stated the belief that the song "helps to show the songwriting diversity" on the album. The song opens with what is described as a thrash metal-oriented groove, according to Guitar World. This section is performed at 172 beats per minute, according to Webster. Loudwire said the song "starts off pretty fast, but that only lasts for 10 seconds and the bloody beatdown is on!" The site described the song's rhythm section as employing a "slow-burning, menacing chug". Tom Cronin of Celestial Sanctuary wrote in an article published by Metal Hammer that the riff was the "heaviest thing [he'd] ever heard" and conferred the title of "the king of all dumb-dumb riffs" on it. He explained: "Imagine someone breaking off a piece of stalagmite from a cave floor and pulverising your face until you’re just a lifeless body in a Cannibal Corpse T-shirt with nothing but a blood puddle left where your head used to be - then you're halfway there." Kerrang! said the song "feels like a distillation of this, the band’s whole history melted down and refined into a marching, bloodthirsty rager." Blabbermouth said the song contains "loping evil".

The song's lyrics describe a person "being tortured and flayed in Hell with metal whips," according to Loudwire.
