= Boss DS-1 =

Guitar effect pedal

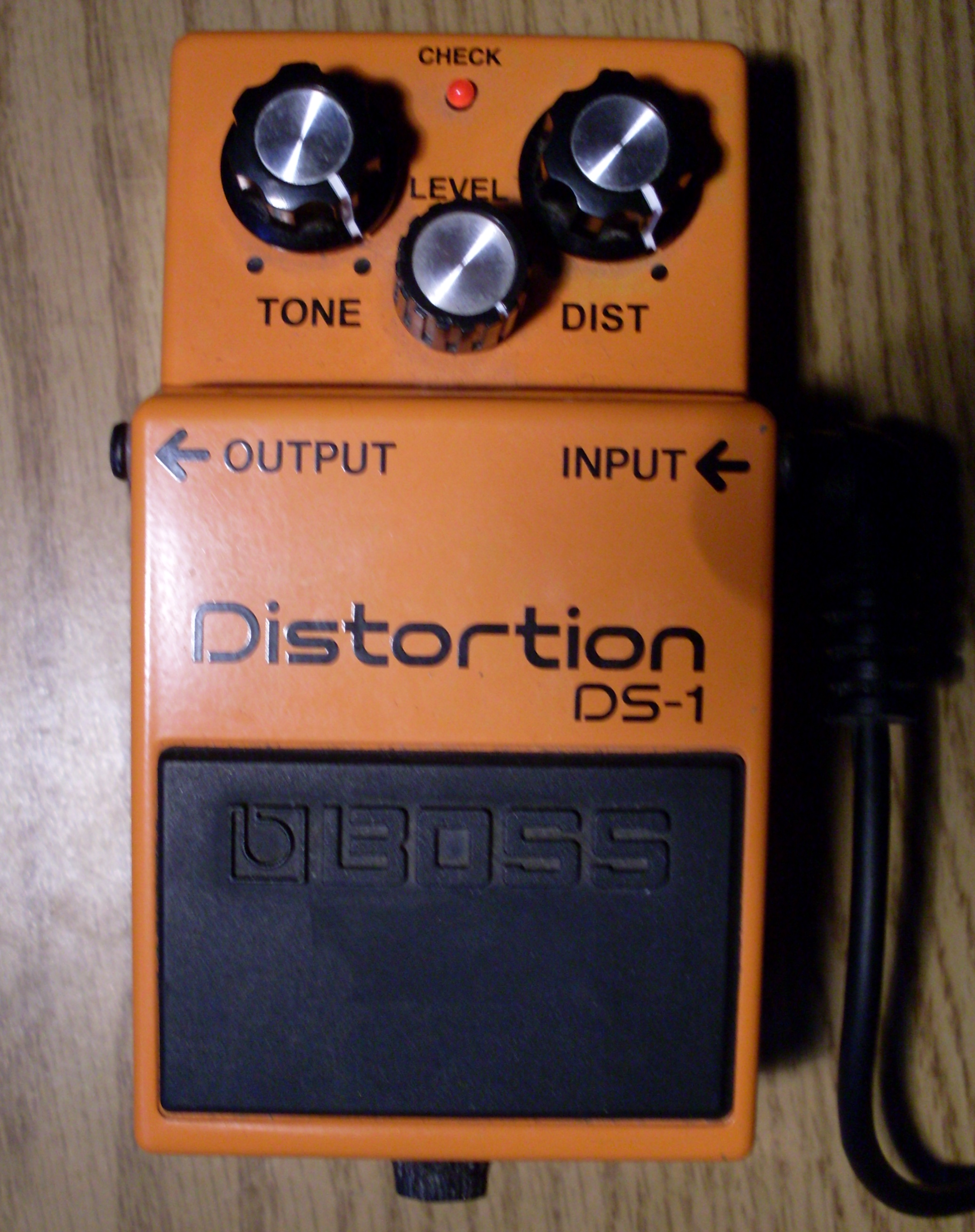
- Brand: Boss
- Manufacturer: Roland Corporation
- Dates: 1978—present

Technical specifications
- Effects type: Distortion pedal

Controls
- Pedal control: Tone, Level, Distortion

Input/output
- Inputs: mono
- Outputs: mono

The Boss DS-1 Distortion is a distortion pedal manufactured by Boss since 1978. Alongside the ProCo Rat released the same year, the DS-1 helped popularize tight, aggressive tones through the use of "hard-clipping" circuitry, a class of effects pedals that became known as distortion pedals after the DS-1. Like Boss's first soft-clipping overdrive, the OD-1, the DS-1 would serve as a template for pedals of the same type that followed.

In its history, the DS-1 has undergone several revisions and alterations in tone. After the original preamp model that Boss used became scarce, the DS-1's circuit was redesigned in 1994, introducing several issues like reduced volume and a "fizzy" or "waspy" edge. Fixing these problems spawned a community of pedal modifiers, with some major boutique effects pedal manufacturers starting out modding DS-1s. It has remained the bestselling Boss "drive" pedal since its creation.

In 1987, Boss released a follow-up, the DS-2 Turbo Distortion, which featured a "turbo" mode that added an additional gain stage and a low-midrange boost. Kurt Cobain notably used 1980s editions of the DS-1, as well as the DS-2.

== Variations ==
DS-1 – The original pedal, released in 1978.

DS-1 Gold - Very limited gold version was produced in 1998 to celebrate 6 million Boss pedals sold worldwide. It’s estimated between 4 and 6 units exist.

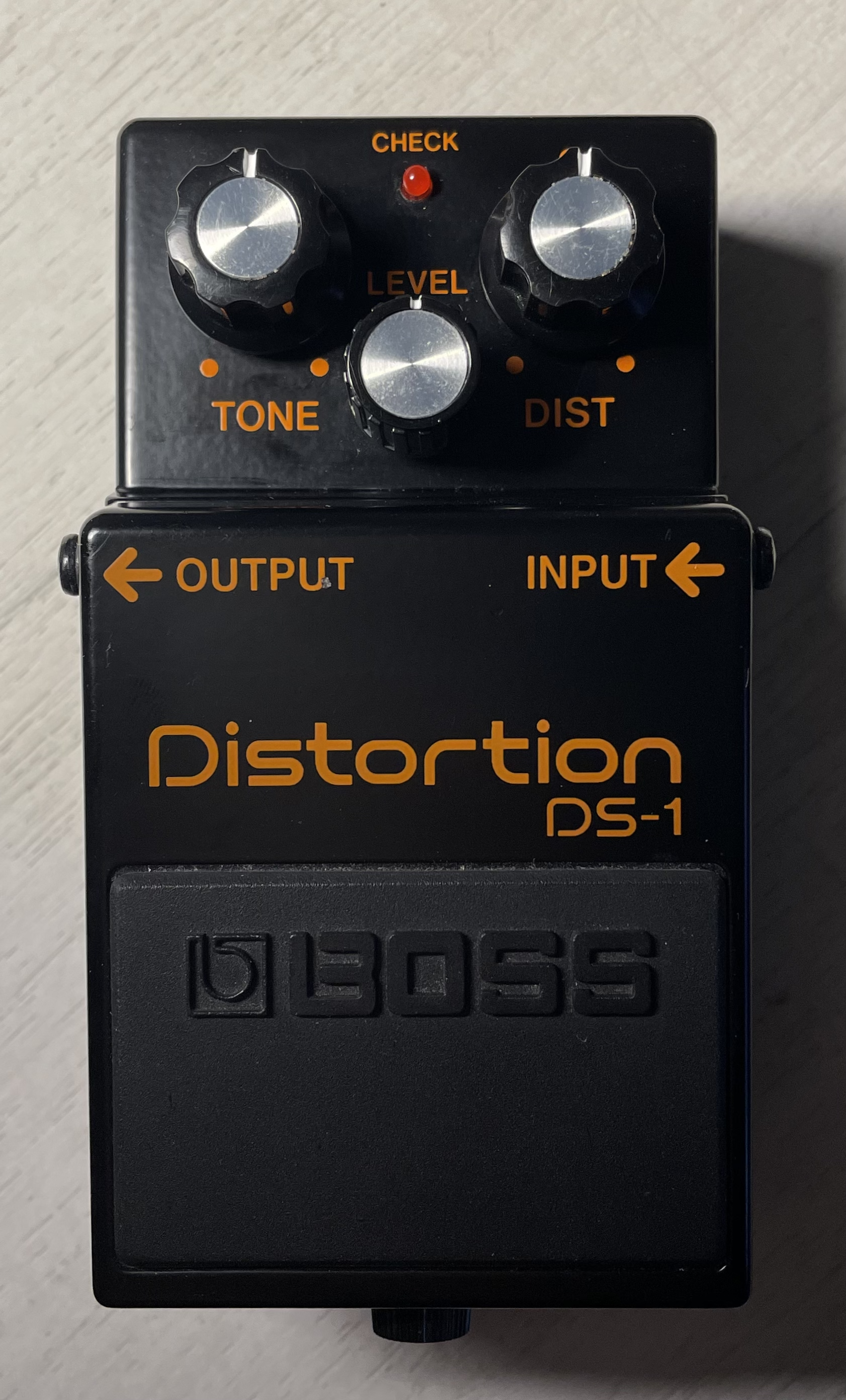
Boss DS-1 BK, limited edition pedal edition of 3000 units.

DS-1 BK – Guitar Center exclusive with orange font on a black body, released in 2016 and limited to 3,000 units.

DS-1-4A – 40th-anniversary addition with gold font on a black body, released in 2017.

DS-1W – WazaCraft version, released in 2023.

DS-1-B50A – Orange metallic paint to commemorate the company's 50th anniversary; released in 2023 and limited to 7,000 units.

DS-1 White – Guitar Center/Musician's Friend/Music & Arts exclusive metallic white with black font, released in 2024

== Circuit ==
The blueprint of the DS-1 circuit is simple, with a pair of in- and output buffers surrounding a transistor boost stage, an operational amplifier gain stage with hard clipping diodes, and a tone control.

It features the same JFET switching circuit as some other Boss effects units, allowing a simple momentary push button to reroute the signal, either bypassing the effect or engaging it. In either state, the signal will pass through the input and output buffer stage of the effect, and this is the key differentiating factor between Boss pedals and "true bypass" pedals. The buffers themselves are similar, both Common collector amplifiers with unity gain. They each feature a 2SC2240 Toshiba transistor, which is only special insofar as it is cheap and reliable.

The transistor boost stage consists of two highpass filters in series, followed by a Common emitter amplifier. This serves to remove unnecessary bass frequencies before the distortion stage, preventing the signal from accumulating muddiness as it is amplified. This stage provides a 35 dB boost to the signal, and introduces a small amount of distortion.

The operational amplifier gain stage is the most important part of the Boss DS-1 circuit, featuring the clipping diodes, Op-amps and further filters which refine and color the sound. The op-amp stage is the only part of the circuit which has undergone any real changes over the pedal's history. Originally, in 1978, the circuit was built around the Toshiba TA7136AP pre-amplifier, not an op-amp, and this gave the effect more of a warm, rich sound. In 1994, the Toshiba pre-amps were nearing the end of their stock life, and so the circuit had to be modified in order to play host to an easier to find dual op amp, the Rohm BA728N. This version is slightly quieter than the original, but is otherwise essentially the same. The Rohm op-amp was replaced in 2000 by the Mitsubishi M5223AL op-amp, which remains the centerpiece of the circuit to this day. Most of the distortion itself is handled by the silicon 1N4148 clipping diodes organized in a hard clipping arrangement, clipping any signal above 0.7v and below -0.7v. One of the popular modifications to the DS-1 consists of replacing one or both of the diodes, labeled D4 and D5, with LED or germanium diodes. Depending on the diodes, the pedal can take on many different sonic characters. A diode with a low forward voltage will make the pedal quieter but with a more saturated distortion; a diode with a high forward voltage will be louder but with less available distortion.

Last but not least, the humble "big muff pi" style tone control immediately preceding the output buffer is a fixed cutoff low-pass filter and a fixed cuttoff high-pass filter which attenuate either the low or high end, depending on the position of the potentiometer. The way the two filters are interconnected creates a notch, or scoop, around 500 Hz when the potentiometer is in the center position. The seesaw nature of the tone control leads to a -12 dB volume loss which gives the pedal an output of 350mV, which is suitable for most applications but does create issues with the DS-1 being able to achieve unity gain with higher level inputs.

== DS-2 Turbo Distortion ==
Boss DS-2

In 1987, Boss released the DS-2 Turbo Distortion as an alternative to the DS-1. The DS-2 notably featured an additional "turbo" section that included "I" and "II" modes, which could be switched between using an external remote.

While mode one is generally thought to replicate the sound of the DS-1, Guitar World noted that it was tonally different in large part due to several design changes, such as the inclusion of soft-clipping diodes in a feedback loop, as well as a JFET-based "discrete" op-amp, meaning the op-amp is composed of individual components (four JFETs) acting in the same way a single microchip would. This brought the DS-2's topology closer to that of the Boss BD-2 Blues Driver, which also uses a discrete op-amp. Mode one also did not suffer from the volume or fizzy tone issues of post-1994 DS-1s.

Mode two added a second gain stage and a lower-midrange boost that introduced a "honk" that aided solos. Kurt Cobain and John Frusciante both used the DS-2.

== See also ==
- Boss MT-2
- Boss SD-1
- List of distortion pedals
