= Boss BD-2 =

Guitar overdrive pedal made by Boss

- Brand: Boss
- Manufacturer: Roland Corporation
- Dates: 1995–present

Technical specifications
- Effects type: Overdrive pedal

Controls
- Pedal control: Level, Tone, Gain

Input/output
- Inputs: Mono
- Outputs: Mono

The BD-2 Blues Driver is an overdrive pedal made by the Boss Corporation. Boss released the BD-2 in 1995 at a time when the blues was experiencing renewed popularity thanks to players like Eric Clapton and Gary Moore. The BD-2 features a unique, preamp-style circuit design with a more neutral EQ curve than rival pedals (like the midrange-heavy Ibanez Tube Screamer), which are generally designed to push an amplifier's tubes harder rather than mimic the behavior of an amp as the BD-2 does. The BD-2 has achieved iconic status among guitarists, with its "touch sensitivity and broad sound palette" appealing to players beyond just the blues. It has remained in production since its debut.

In 2023, Boss celebrated its own 50th anniversary by releasing limited edition versions of three of their most long-running pedals: the DS-1 Distortion, SD-1 Super Overdrive, and BD-2 Blues Driver.

== History ==
Into the mid-1990s, grunge and alternative rock had led to a rapidly changing landscape for guitar tone, but the blues was nonetheless experiencing a resurgence thanks to guitarists like Eric Clapton and Gary Moore. Boss realized there was a market for a pedal that created "dynamic, expressive" tones rather than the "complete destruction" that distortion pedals of the era provided. Boss aimed for a pedal design with a flatter EQ than rivals like the Ibanez Tube Screamer and that would add gain to the signal but maintain the signal's clarity and dynamics.

Boss released its new pedal in 1995 as the Blues Driver, with the "2" in its BD-2 model name indicating the pedal belonged to Boss' second generation of compact pedals, which the company had begun making in the 1980s. The BD-2 was characterized by a clear, punchy tone, although at higher gain levels it takes on an "edgy, grinding" quality. Despite its blues-oriented name—and that mainstream interest in blues rock has waned since the pedal's release—the BD-2 has found many fans beyond the blues genre thanks to its dynamic, amp-like qualities. Guitar.com dubbed it a pedalboard "staple" among both amateur and professional guitarists. Notable fans have included Prince, Billie Joe Armstrong of Green Day, and Tom Morello of Rage Against the Machine.

In 2015, Boss released their Waza Craft version of the BD-2, the BD-2W, which features upgraded components and a toggle switch that lets users choose between a "refined" version of the pedal's standard sound and a fuller-sounding custom mode. In 2023, Boss released 50th anniversary limited edition versions of the BD-2 alongside the DS-1 and SD-1, three of their most popular pedals. 7,000 were produced of each, with metallic finishes, silver thumb screws for the battery compartment, and gold-capped knobs.

== Design ==
=== Form factor ===
The BD-2 uses Boss' characteristic compact enclosure style, with a large, hinge-mounted footswitch and a trio of controls—in this case, Level, Tone, and Gain. The case is blue with yellow lettering.

=== Circuit ===
Like many Boss drive pedals, the BD-2 is a design unique to the company rather than a modified version of an existing pedal. It uses a relatively complex circuit that mimics a tube preamp, with a fixed-value tone stack (meant to imitate a Fender combo-style amp) and a unique initial gain stage. This gain stage is composed of "discrete op-amps": instead of having a conventional op-amp microchip early in the circuit, an arrangement of two FETs followed by a bipolar transistor is used. Functionally, this works identically to an op-amp chip but feels and sounds less "sterile" and more responsive. Two such discrete op-amps are used in tandem, wired together with a dual gang potentiometer as a variable resistor. These are followed by the three-band (Fender-style) tone stack, with treble fixed at zero and mids and bass fixed at 10. This leaves the BD-2 bass-heavy, which helps contribute to the pedal sounding fuzz-like at higher gain settings since the signal has yet to be clipped. The signal is then clipped by two diodes before being fed into another discrete op-amp, which further boosts bass frequencies. High-pass and low-pass filters follow to reduce high harmonics and some bass content, while the subsequent tone control pans between additional such filters. The next stage in the circuit again boosts bass, but its diodes serve mostly to protect the op-amp from being hit too hard with a loud signal. The signal proceeds to the switching circuit and then the output buffer.

== Legacy ==
The BD-2 is a common platform for modifications, with boutique pedal makers like Robert Keeley and Josh Scott having offered popular modding services. Boss went on to collaborate with Scott on the Boss JB-2 Angry Driver, which combines the BD-2 and the Marshall-esque JHS Angry Charlie circuits into one pedal.

== See also ==
- Boss MT-2
- King of Tone
- List of distortion pedals
