= Pray for the Sentencing =

Compilation album by Solstice
- Released: June 12, 2012
- Recorded: 1992 at Morrisound Studios in Tampa, Florida; 1995 at The Studio, Miami in Miami, Florida; 2011 at The Studio, Miami in Miami, Florida
- Genres: Death metal, thrash metal, death-thrash
- Length: 104:26
- Label: Divebomb
- Producers: Solstice, Dennis Munoz

Solstice chronology
To Dust (2009)	Pray for the Sentencing (2012)	2021 (Casting the Die)

Pray for the Sentencing is a two-disc compilation album by American death/thrash band Solstice. The first CD contains remastered songs from the band's first two albums, Solstice and Pray. The second disc contains remixes of the songs from Pray by guitarist Dennis Munoz.

== Track listing ==
Tracks 1–9 are from Solstice, while tracks 10–19 are from Pray.

CD 1: Solstice (1992)/Pray (1995)
No.	Title	Length
1.	"Transmogrified"	3:45
2.	"Cleansed of Impurity"	4:01
3.	"Eternal Waking"	3:38
4.	"Survival Reaction"	3:01
5.	"S.M.D." (Carnivore cover)	2:22
6.	"Netherworld"	4:41
7.	"Plasticized"	3:25
8.	"Cataclysmic Outburst"	3:25
9.	"Aberration"	4:18
10.	"The Unseen"	3:32
11.	"Denial"	3:28
12.	"Pray"	3:27
13.	"All Life Lost"	3:42
14.	"Freedom Denied"	2:54
15.	"Closeminded Failure"	4:16
16.	"Depression"	2:58
17.	"Bleeding Unborn"	4:15
18.	"One at a Time"	3:46
19.	"Eyes See Red"	3:03
Total length:		67:55

CD 2: Pray remixed (2011)
No.	Title	Length
1.	"The Unseen" (Remix)	3:32
2.	"Denial" (Remix)	3:54
3.	"Pray" (Remix)	3:27
4.	"All Life Lost" (Remix)	3:43
5.	"Freedom Denied" (Remix)	2:52
6.	"Closeminded Failure" (Remix)	4:15
7.	"Depression" (Remix)	2:59
8.	"Bleeding Unborn" (Remix)	4:16
9.	"One at a Time" (Remix)	3:47
10.	"Eyes See Red" (Remix)	3:46
Total length:		36:31

== Personnel ==
Solstice

- Rob Barrett – vocals, guitar (tracks 1–1 to 1–9)
- Christian Rudes – vocals, guitar (tracks 1–10 to 1–19, 2–1 to 2–10)
- Dennis Munoz – guitar
- Mark Van Erp – bass (tracks 1–1 to 1–9)
- Garret Scott – bass (tracks 1–10 to 1–19, 2–1 to 2–10)
- Alex Marquez – drums

Production

- Solstice – mixing and production on Solstice and Pray
- Dennis Munoz – mixing and production on Pray remix
- Jamie King – mastering
- Kelly Ros – artwork
- Edward J. Repka – layout and design
