= Boss MT-2 =

Distortion effects pedal

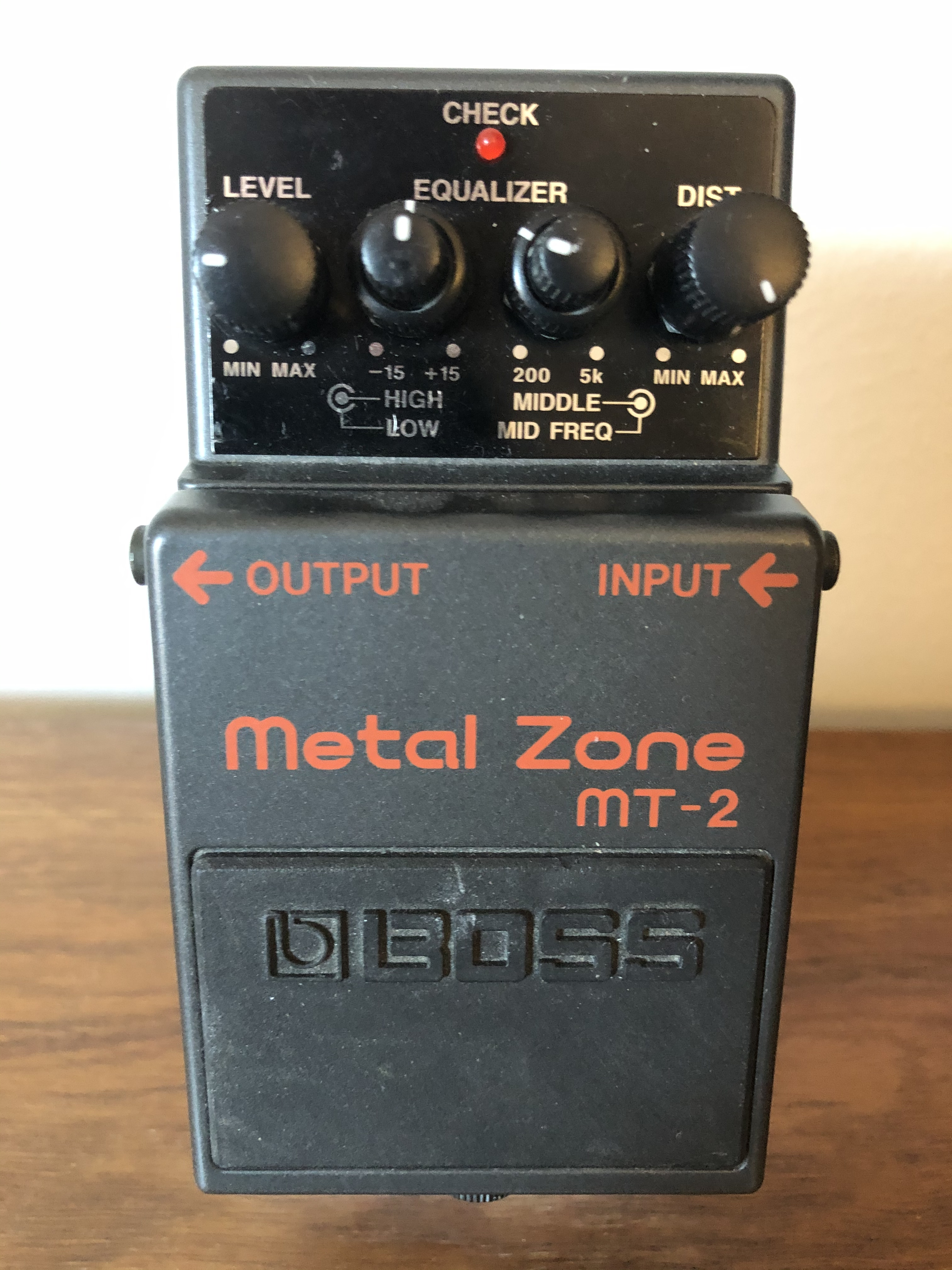
- Brand: Boss
- Manufacturer: Roland Corporation
- Dates: 1991–present

Technical specifications
- Effects type: Distortion pedal

Controls
- Pedal control: Level, High, Low, Mid, Mid Freq, Dist

Input/output
- Inputs: Mono
- Outputs: Mono

The Boss MT-2 Metal Zone is a distortion pedal released by Boss in 1991. Designed for heavy metal guitarists, the Metal Zone is characterized by its high-gain capabilities; thick, tight tone; and powerful semi-parametric EQ controls. The extreme sounds the pedal is capable of producing made it successful yet divisive upon its release. The MT-2 has sold over a million units, more than any Boss distortion or overdrive pedal except the DS-1, and has been in continuous production since its debut.

== History ==
=== Development ===
Following the discontinuation of the earlier Boss HM-2, which found a niche market in the surging death metal genre but otherwise sold poorly due in part to its limited range of usable tones, Boss sought to appeal to metal players with a more versatile pedal in the Metal Zone. Former Boss president Yoshi Ikegami noted that at the time high-gain amplifier offerings were limited and generally out of reach of non-professional players, while pro guitarists' unique tones were often dependent on how they chose to sculpt the midrange frequencies. As a result, Boss settled on a complex design for a distortion pedal, with a dual-stage gain circuit, seven filters for both pre- and post-distortion, and a uniquely powerful semi-parametric three-band EQ section that allows users to adjust which midrange frequencies to emphasize then significantly cut or boost them. Boss assigned the Metal Zone the number "2" in its model designation because, like the HM-2 before it, the Metal Zone was part of Boss' second generation of compact pedals released in the 1980s and 1990s.

=== Reception ===
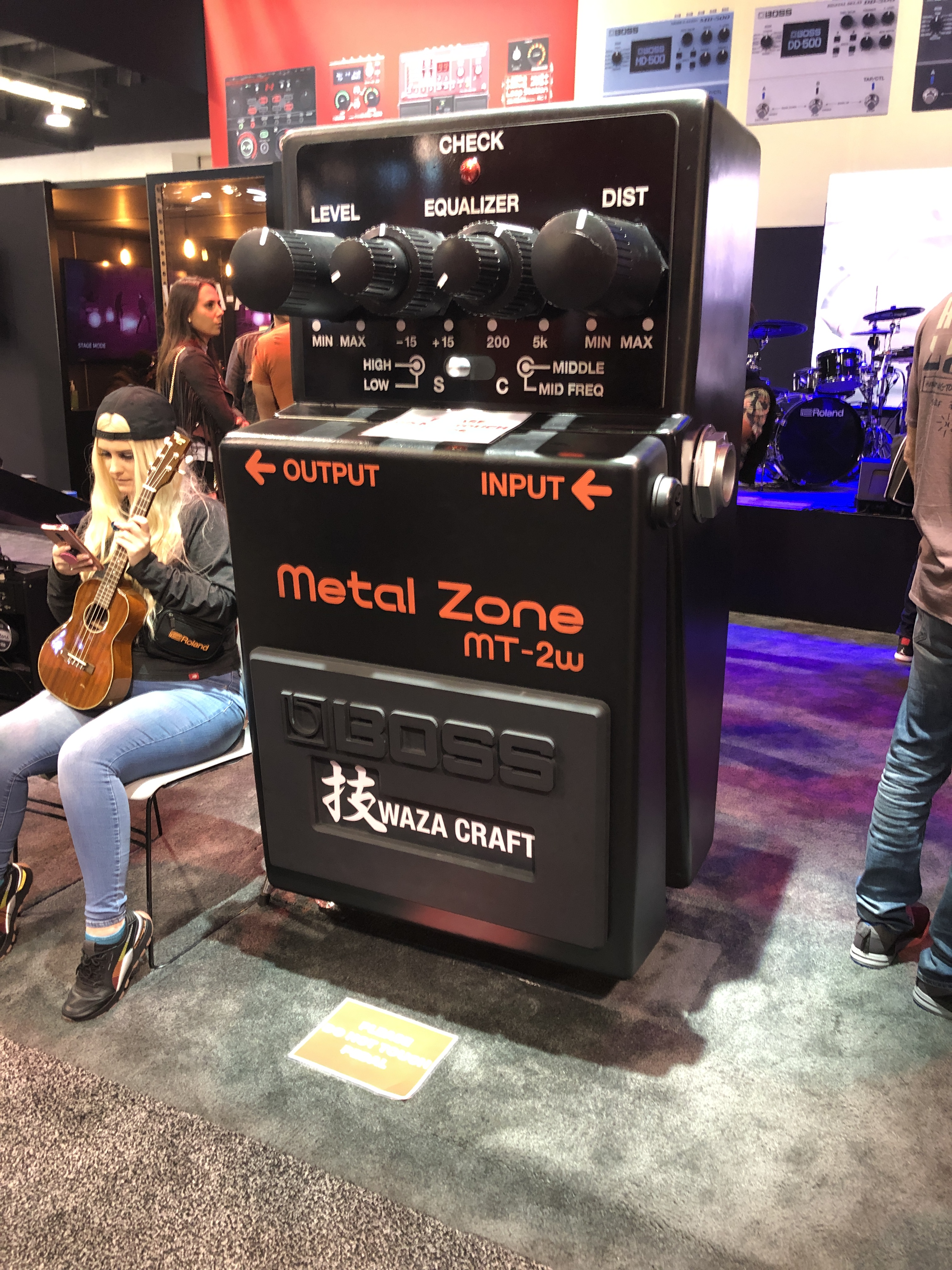
A Boss MT-2 Metal Zone display at Winter NAMM 2020.

MT-2 oscillogram

In a retrospective, Premier Guitar described the MT-2 as "literally the hottest piece of gear in the guitar world" upon its 1991 release. For its October 1992 issue, Guitar Player conducted a "shoot-out" of 29 distortion pedals and concluded the MT-2 was the standout model for metal players. Demand was so high, however, the magazine could not photograph the pedal for the article before the store that loaned it asked for it back to help fill backorders.

Despite its initial praise, popular opinion of the Metal Zone turned in subsequent decades, in part due to younger players not knowing how to get the best sounds from it, with Premier Guitar writing that "[t]he endless hordes of preteens that butchered 'Crazy Train' through a Metal Zone at their local Guitar Center probably didn't help" the pedal's reputation. Detractors often compared the Metal Zone to "buzzing bees" and lampooned it as the worst pedal ever made. Guitar World characterized the general reaction to the pedal as "inspiring or confusing." Music Radar suggested the problems guitarists had with the Metal Zone stemmed from the tone controls being too complicated and it having too much gain available, with players not realizing it was best to start with lower gain settings. Kurt Ballou expressed a similar sentiment: "Guitarists tend to turn things all the way up, but, as with most gear, that’s not typically the best way to use an MT-2."

Despite the negative reactions, the Metal Zone has found users inside the metal community and out. At the Gates and Cannibal Corpse embraced the pedal, while Nathan Weaver of Wolves in the Throne Room favorably described the MT-2 as a "fucked-up, corpse-grinding type sound." Prince notably used a Metal Zone on tour throughout the 1990s. Blues guitarist Joe Bonamassa cited the MT-2 as his favorite Boss "dirt" pedal and said, "Just because it’s called the Metal Zone, that doesn’t mean you need to run the gain all the way up." Munky of Korn likes the pedal for "lo-fi" effects.

With the release of a 30th anniversary edition, the MT-2-3A, the Metal Zone has experienced a degree of public reevaluation. Premier Guitar observed that while the dismissive clickbait titles remain, many YouTube content creators conclude their reviews with praise for the pedal. In a viral video reviewing the MT-2, Ola Englund praised the MT-2 after admitting he was unimpressed by it in the 1990s. His review also popularized using the MT-2 as a preamp into the return of an amp's effects loop.

Outside of the music industry, the MT-2 found notoriety when online conspiracy theorists repurposed the pedal's schematics to fake evidence that COVID-19 vaccines contained implanted 5G chips.

== Design ==
The Metal Zone features a dual-stage gain circuit, seven filters for both pre- and post-distortion, and a semi-parametric three-band EQ section. The high and low controls are active, with a significant 15 dB of cut or boost; the mids control has the same 15 dB of range, while paired with a separate mid frequency control. In an article on how to best use the Metal Zone, Guitar World wrote that the high control is crucial, as it acts as a shelving EQ that interacts with the pedal's other settings. Simply rolling it back removes some undesirable fizziness, but will also remove high mids and result in an overly dark tone. The mid frequency control has a wide range, from 200 Hz all the way to 5 kHz, making it functionally a global active EQ, rather than simply a mid frequency control. The mid frequency also dictates the character of the distortion. In 2021, Boss released a Waza Craft version of the MT-2, which added a Custom mode that enhanced lower mids and tightened lows for a more contemporary metal sound.

== Notable users ==
- Kurt Ballou
- Rob Barrett of Cannibal Corpse
- Matt Bigland of Dinosaur Pile-Up
- Anders Björler of At the Gates
- Joe Bonamassa
- Dino Cazares of Fear Factory
- Dan Donegan of Disturbed
- Ola Englund
- Warren Haynes of the Allman Brothers Band
- Martin Larsson of At the Gates
- Stone Mecca
- Munky of Korn
- Dave Mustaine of Megadeth
- Simon Neil of Biffy Clyro
- Craig Nicholls of the Vines
- Prince
- Nathan Weaver of Wolves in the Throne Room
- Kirk Windstein of Crowbar

== See also ==
- Boss SD-1
- List of distortion pedals
