= Solstice (death metal band) =

American death metal band

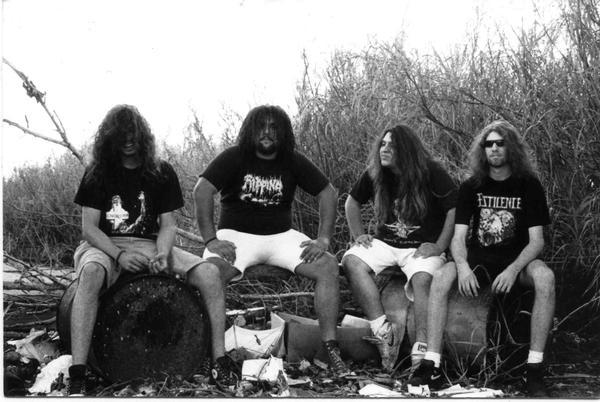

Background information
- Origin: Miami, Florida, U.S.
- Genres: Death metal; thrash metal; death-thrash
- Years active: 1990–1993, 1995–1997, 2000, 2006–present
- Members: Dennis Muñoz; Alex Marquez; Ryan Taylor; Marcel Salas
- Past members: Rob Barrett; Brian Harris; Dave Smith; Mark Van Erp; Garrett Scott; Josh Gibbs

Solstice is an American death/thrash metal band from Miami, Florida. They were formed in the 1990s by drummer Alex Marquez and guitarists Rob Barrett and Dennis Munoz. The band released two albums, Solstice (1992) and Pray (1995), both on Steamhammer Records. A third album, To Dust, was released in 2009. In 2021, the re-formed band released a new album, Casting the Die, with Danish indie label Emanzipation Productions.

== Members ==
Current members

- Dennis Muñoz – guitar (1990–present)
- Alex Marquez – drums (1990–1997, 2011–present)
- Ryan Taylor – guitar, vocals (2013–present)
- Marcel Salas – bass (2017–present)

Former members

- Rob Barrett – guitar, vocals (1990–1992)
- Brian Harris – drums
- Dave Smith – bass
- Mark Van Erp − bass
- Garrett Scott – bass
- Doug Williams – bass
- Christian Rudes – guitar, vocals
- Josh Gibbs – bass

== Discography ==
=== Studio albums ===
- Solstice (1992)
- Pray (1995)
- To Dust (2009)
- Casting the Die (2021)

=== Demos ===
- Demo 1991 (1991)

=== Compilations ===
- Pray for the Sentencing (2012)
