= Violence Unimagined =

Studio album by Cannibal Corpse
- Released: April 14, 2021
- Recorded: 2020
- Studio: Mana Recording Studios, St. Petersburg, Florida
- Genre: Death metal
- Length: 42:48
- Label: Metal Blade
- Producer: Erik Rutan

Cannibal Corpse chronology
| Red Before Black (2017) | Violence Unimagined (2021) | Chaos Horrific (2023) |

Singles from Violence Unimagined
- 1. "Inhumane Harvest" Released: February 1, 2021; 2. "Murderous Rampage" Released: March 23, 2021; 3. "Necrogenic Resurrection" Released: April 19, 2021

Alternate cover
- Alternate "Explicit" cover of Violence Unimagined

Violence Unimagined is the fifteenth studio album by American death metal band Cannibal Corpse, first released on April 14, 2021 in Japan, then on April 16 worldwide.

It is the band's first album in nearly four years since Red Before Black (2017), the longest gap between two records in Cannibal Corpse's career, and the first studio album to feature producer Erik Rutan on lead guitar, replacing Pat O'Brien in February 2021 after nearly two years of filling in for him on tour.

== Background ==
Cannibal Corpse began writing for new material in 2019, and in 2020 the group began demos for Violence Unimagined. In a new interview with Wall of Sound, drummer Paul Mazurkiewicz spoke about Erik Rutan joining the band revealing: "He's a great guy, great worker, great guitar player. He wrote some great songs and it's been a challenge to play his stuff and fun to learn somebody else's take on what Cannibal Corpse would sound like in their eyes. It's been positive all round having him for sure."

== Reception ==
Professional ratings
Aggregate scores
| Source | Rating |
|---|---|
| Metacritic | 79/100 |
Review scores
| Source | Rating |
| Angry Metal Guy | 3/5 stars |
| Blabbermouth.net | 9/10 |
| Consequence of Sound | B+ |
| Distorted Sound Magazine | 8/10 |
| Kerrang! | 4/5 stars |
| Metal Hammer | 4/5 stars |
| Metal Injection | 9/10 |
| Pitchfork | 7.3/10 |
| PopMatters | 7/10 |
| Sputnikmusic | 3.8/5 |

Violence Unimagined received positive reviews from critics. Sean McLennan of New Noise Magazine wrote, "Continuously reinventing each album around creative new ways to kill or be killed, Cannibal Corpse continue their mission to spread global devastation through the dominant beast that is Violence Unimagined. Marking the band's fifteenth release through Metal Blade Records, the upcoming terror embodies every horrendous characteristic we've come to love about this band and then some. Instrumentally unstoppable and visually indescribable, Violence Unimagined sees Cannibal Corpse entering the post-pandemic world as the colossal conquerors of death metal." Wall of Sound's Duane James praised the release (and inclusion of new guitarist Erik Rutan) giving it a 9/10 and revealing, "these icons of death metal have once again risen above and delivered a rock solid classic"

Loudwire called it one of the best metal albums of 2021.

=== Accolades ===
| Publication | Accolade | Rank |
|---|---|---|
| Consequence | Top 30 Metal & Hard Rock Albums | 24 |
| Decibel | Top 40 Albums of 2021 | 20 |
| Loudwire | The 45 Best Rock + Metal Albums of 2021 | 19 |

== Track listing ==
| No. | Title | Lyrics | Music | Length |
|---|---|---|---|---|
| 1. | "Murderous Rampage" | Mazurkiewicz | Barrett | 4:07 |
| 2. | "Necrogenic Resurrection" | Webster | Webster | 3:06 |
| 3. | "Inhumane Harvest" | Barrett | Barrett | 4:32 |
| 4. | "Condemnation Contagion" | Rutan | Rutan | 4:17 |
| 5. | "Surround, Kill, Devour" | Webster | Webster | 4:10 |
| 6. | "Ritual Annihilation" | Rutan | Rutan | 3:48 |
| 7. | "Follow the Blood" | Barrett | Barrett | 4:39 |
| 8. | "Bound and Burned" | Barrett | Barrett | 4:04 |
| 9. | "Slowly Sawn" | Webster | Webster | 3:30 |
| 10. | "Overtorture" | Rutan | Rutan | 2:28 |
| 11. | "Cerements of the Flayed" | Mazurkiewicz | Webster | 4:07 |
| Total length: | | | | 42:48 |

== Personnel ==
=== Cannibal Corpse ===
The members of Cannibal Corpse are as follows:

- George "Corpsegrinder" Fisher – lead vocals
- Erik Rutan – lead guitar, backing vocals on "Murderous Rampage"
- Rob Barrett – rhythm guitar
- Alex Webster – bass
- Paul Mazurkiewicz – drums

=== Additional personnel ===
- Vince Locke – artwork

== Charts ==
Chart performance for Violence Unimagined
| Chart (2021) | Peak position |
|---|---|
| Australian Albums (ARIA) | 28 |
| Austrian Albums (Ö3 Austria) | 5 |
| Belgian Albums (Ultratop Flanders) | 51 |
| Belgian Albums (Ultratop Wallonia) | 101 |
| Canadian Albums (Billboard) | 53 |
| Dutch Albums (Album Top 100) | 52 |
| Finnish Albums (Suomen virallinen lista) | 12 |
| French Albums (SNEP) | 132 |
| German Albums (Offizielle Top 100) | 6 |
| Italian Albums (FIMI) | 60 |
| Japanese Albums (Oricon) | 105 |
| Polish Albums (ZPAV) | 27 |
| Scottish Albums (OCC) | 9 |
| Swedish Hard Rock Albums (Sverigetopplistan) | 1 |
| Swedish Physical Albums (Sverigetopplistan) | 5 |
| Swiss Albums (Schweizer Hitparade) | 7 |
| UK Albums (OCC) | 81 |
| UK Independent Albums (OCC) | 2 |
| UK Rock & Metal Albums (OCC) | 4 |
| US Billboard 200 | 45 |
| US Independent Albums (Billboard) | 5 |
| Billboard Top Albums (Billboard) | 6 |
| US Top Hard Rock Albums (Billboard) | 3 |
| US Top Rock Albums (Billboard) | 6 |
