= Chaos Horrific =

Studio album by Cannibal Corpse
- Released: September 22, 2023
- Studios: Rutan's Mana Studio, Florida
- Genre: Death metal
- Length: 39:15
- Label: Metal Blade
- Producer: Erik Rutan

Cannibal Corpse chronology
Violence Unimagined (2021)	Chaos Horrific (2023)

Singles from Chaos Horrific
- 1. "Blood Blind" Released: June 22, 2023; 2. "Summoned for Sacrifice" Released: August 9, 2023; 3. "Chaos Horrific" Released: September 22, 2023

Chaos Horrific is the sixteenth studio album by American death metal band Cannibal Corpse, released on September 22, 2023, by Metal Blade.

== Background ==
Material for the album was written shortly after the completion of their previous studio album Violence Unimagined in 2021. Recording sessions took place in Rutan's Mana Studio in Florida and were described as "smoother than ever". The album was named by drummer Paul Mazurkiewicz, who felt it was an appropriate representation of the band. To bassist Alex Webster, the record feels like a "continuation of Violence Unimagined". Guitarist Rob Barrett opined that their songwriting skills had evolved in a way that every song "paves its own path", whether it is "straightforward", "technical" or a "mix of both". Webster added that there was no "conscious effort" to create a technical record, but if it ended up being that, it would have just been a "natural result". Erik Rutan, producing his sixth album for the band, tried to "push the envelope" and "explore new territory" this time around.

== Critical reception ==
Professional ratings
Review scores
Source	Rating
AllMusic	3.5/5 stars
Angry Metal Guy	3.5/5
Blabbermouth.net	9/10
Distorted Sound Magazine	8/10
Kerrang!	4/5
Metal.de	8/10
MetalSucks	4/5 stars
Metal Injection	8/10
Metal Storm	8/10
PopMatters	8/10
Sputnikmusic	3.7/5

Chaos Horrific was met with universal acclaim by music critics. Bree Halmstad at MetalSucks claimed the album was further proof that the band was on "top of the death metal food chain after 35 years," with an album that encapsulates a "sort of variety that keeps the listener engaged". Omne Metallum at Metal Storm thought that Chaos Horrific "breathes life into the corpse once more" and "merits any inclusion" on year-end lists and a high ranking within the band's discography alike. Metal.de's Oliver Di Iorio opined that the record was yet another "standard work" where no song really "stands out".

== Track listing ==
Chaos Horrific track listing
No.	Title	Lyrics	Music	Length
1.	"Overlords of Violence"	Webster	Webster	3:07
2.	"Frenzied Feeding"	Rutan	Rutan	3:33
3.	"Summoned for Sacrifice"	Mazurkiewicz	Barrett	4:05
4.	"Blood Blind"	Mazurkiewicz	Rutan	4:34
5.	"Vengeful Invasion"	Barrett	Barrett	4:44
6.	"Chaos Horrific"	Mazurkiewicz	Webster	3:32
7.	"Fracture and Refracture"	Webster	Webster	3:36
8.	"Pitchfork Impalement"	Mazurkiewicz	Barrett	3:16
9.	"Pestilential Rictus"	Webster	Webster	4:13
10.	"Drain You Empty"	Rutan	Rutan	4:35
Total length:				39:15

== Personnel ==
=== Cannibal Corpse ===
The members of Cannibal Corpse are as follows:

- George "Corpsegrinder" Fisher – lead vocals
- Erik Rutan – lead guitar, backing vocals
- Rob Barrett – rhythm guitar
- Alex Webster – bass
- Paul Mazurkiewicz – drums

=== Additional personnel ===
- Vince Locke – artwork

== Charts ==
Chart performance for Chaos Horrific
Chart (2023)	Peak position
Australian Albums (ARIA)	120
Australian Physical Albums (ARIA)	9
Austrian Albums (Ö3 Austria)	13
Belgian Albums (Ultratop Flanders)	111
Belgian Albums (Ultratop Wallonia)	152
Dutch Albums (Album Top 100)	97
Finnish Albums (Suomen virallinen lista)	22
French Albums (SNEP)	102
German Albums (Offizielle Top 100)	6
Polish Albums (ZPAV)	27
Scottish Albums (Official Charts)	13
Swiss Albums (Schweizer Hitparade)	10
UK Album Downloads (Official Charts)	27
UK Independent Albums (Official Charts)	8
UK Rock & Metal Albums (Official Charts)	1
US Billboard 200	142
US Independent Albums (Billboard)	26
US Top Hard Rock Albums (Billboard)	9
