= Red Before Black =

Studio album by Cannibal Corpse
- Released: November 3, 2017
- Recorded: December 2016, April–June 2017 at Mana Recording Studios
- Genre: Death metal
- Length: 46:26
- Label: Metal Blade
- Producer: Erik Rutan

Cannibal Corpse chronology
A Skeletal Domain (2014)	Red Before Black (2017)	Violence Unimagined (2021)

Singles from Red Before Black
- 1. "Code of the Slashers" Released: September 19, 2017; 2. "Red Before Black" Released: October 17, 2017; 3. "Scavenger Consuming Death" Released: November 2, 2017

Professional ratings
Review scores
Source	Rating
AllMusic	3.5/5 stars
Angry Metal Guy	3/5 stars
Blabbermouth.net	8.5/10
Exclaim!	8/10
GIGsoup	71%
MetalSucks	3.5/5 stars
Metal Hammer	3.5/5 stars
Metal Injection	9/10

Red Before Black is the fourteenth studio album by American death metal band Cannibal Corpse, released on November 3, 2017. This is the band's final album to feature guitarist Pat O'Brien before producer Erik Rutan officially replaced him in 2021.

== Background and recording ==
The band started to write the album in 2016 after the last run of touring for their previous album, A Skeletal Domain. When interviewed in 2017 drummer Paul Mazurkiewicz stated that the band never go by any specific blueprints when they start writing for an album, pointing out that this was also the case with Red Before Black. However the idea of utilizing some slower doom elements was discussed beforehand. This manifested in a couple of songs, while they mostly remained true to their death metal sound and thrash metal roots.

Mazurkiewicz came up with the album title while sleeping in the middle of the night, making him wake up. Further down the road of creating the album he said about the title "... I really pushed for it because I felt it was very strong and something very different than our previous titles. It’s simple, but effective".

After hearing the song 'Only One Will Die', penned by bassist Alex Webster, all members of the band thought it should be the first track of the album. The first song they worked on was 'Red Before Black'. It started out as an unnamed piece written by guitarist Pat O'Brien with Mazurkiewicz contributing with a title and the lyrics later.

Choosing to work with Erik Rutan as a producer again after working with Mark Lewis on the previous album was partly because of convenience, enabling the band to stay focused during the recording process, although Rutan's previous work with the band was also a deciding factor.

== Music ==
Alex Webster assessed: "Throughout our career, we've tried to improve the precision of both our musical execution and our album production, while still maintaining full-on aggression. Red Before Black continues in that direction, but might go even further on the aggressive side of things. It's definitely precise, but it has a rawness to it that goes beyond anything we've done recently."

== Track listing ==
No.	Title	Lyrics	Music	Length
1.	"Only One Will Die"	Alex Webster	Webster	3:24
2.	"Red Before Black"	Paul Mazurkiewicz	Pat O'Brien	3:12
3.	"Code of the Slashers"	Rob Barrett	Barrett	4:46
4.	"Shedding My Human Skin"	Mazurkiewicz	O'Brien	3:29
5.	"Remaimed"	Mazurkiewicz	O'Brien	4:14
6.	"Firestorm Vengeance"	Webster	Webster	3:43
7.	"Heads Shoveled Off"	Mazurkiewicz	O'Brien	3:37
8.	"Corpus Delicti"	Barrett	Barrett	3:29
9.	"Scavenger Consuming Death"	Webster	Webster	4:33
10.	"In the Midst of Ruin"	Mazurkiewicz	Barrett	3:26
11.	"Destroyed Without a Trace"	Mazurkiewicz	Barrett; Mazurkiewicz	4:01
12.	"Hideous Ichor"	Webster	Webster	4:34
Total length:				46:26

Limited edition bonus disc: Blood Covered
No.	Title	Lyrics	Music	Original artist	Length
1.	"Sacrifice"	Scott Watts; Rob Urbinati	Watts; Joe Rico	Sacrifice	3:04
2.	"Confessions"	Jeff Becerra	Mike Torrao	Possessed	2:58
3.	"No Remorse"	James Hetfield	Hetfield; Lars Ulrich	Metallica	6:16
4.	"Demon's Night"	Accept	Accept	Accept	4:17
5.	"Bethany Home (A Place to Die)"	The Accüsed	The Accüsed	The Accüsed	3:20
6.	"Endless Pain"	Mille Petrozza; Jürgen Reil	Petrozza	Kreator	3:11
7.	"Behind Bars"	Dave Carlo	Carlo	Razor	2:20

== Credits ==
Writing, performance and production credits are adapted from the album liner notes.

=== Personnel ===
==== Cannibal Corpse ====
- George "Corpsegrinder" Fisher – vocals
- Pat O'Brien – lead guitar
- Rob Barrett – rhythm guitar
- Alex Webster – bass
- Paul Mazurkiewicz – drums

==== Guest musicians ====
- Erik Rutan – backing vocals on "Only One Will Die" and guitar solo on "In the Midst of Ruin"

==== Production ====
- Erik Rutan – production, engineering, mixing
- Art Paiz – assistant engineering
- Alan Douches – mastering

==== Visual art ====
- Vince Locke – cover art
- Brian Ames – layout
- Alex Morgan – photography

=== Studios ===
- Mana Recording Studios, St. Petersburg, FL, United States – engineering, mixing
- West West Side Music, Cornwall, NY, United States – mastering

== Charts ==
Chart	Peak position
Austrian Albums (Ö3 Austria)	29
Belgian Albums (Ultratop Flanders)	116
Belgian Albums (Ultratop Wallonia)	70
Finnish Albums (Suomen virallinen lista)	33
French Albums (SNEP)	101
German Albums (Offizielle Top 100)	16
Swiss Albums (Schweizer Hitparade)	29
US Billboard 200	95
