= Torture (album) =

Studio album by Cannibal Corpse
- Released: March 13, 2012
- Recorded: 2011–2012
- Studios: Sonic Ranch Studios, Tornillo, TX, Mana Studios, St. Petersburg, FL
- Genre: Death metal
- Length: 43:51
- Label: Metal Blade
- Producer: Erik Rutan

Cannibal Corpse chronology
Evisceration Plague (2009)	Torture (2012)	A Skeletal Domain (2014)

Torture is the twelfth studio album by American death metal band Cannibal Corpse, released on March 13, 2012 by Metal Blade Records. The album was produced at Sonic Ranch Studios by Hate Eternal guitarist Erik Rutan (an ex- Morbid Angel member).

The album entered the US Billboard 200 at number 38, selling 9,600 copies its first week.

== Background and recording ==
Bassist Alex Webster said about the record: "After having spent the past seven months writing and rehearsing new material, we're very excited to finally begin recording. We've had great success working with Erik Rutan on our past two albums so we've decided to work with him again, but to keep things fresh we decided on a change of location — we're returning to Sonic Ranch studios in Texas, where we've recorded several albums in the past. We are psyched to see how this combination works out — we feel it's a pairing that could result in our best album yet."

Cannibal Corpse drummer Paul Mazurkiewicz said of the album's writing and recording process, "We've got the same method going now with writing and recording to the click, but I definitely feel a lot more comfortable working with it than I did, say, on Evisceration. I think looking back, Evisceration is a great album, but it was a lot more simplistic in what I was doing, more so than ever, with the lack of drum fills and things going on in the drum department, which I contribute mostly to getting used to that click track. This time around, everything seemed to fall into place a lot easier because of us using it in the past. I felt I really stepped up and was able to work around and play around the click more comfortably. There are some great songs, having Rob step up and write three songs, Pat writing four songs, Alex got the other five songs, it's a very diverse Cannibal Corpse record. And I think all three of them are writing the best songs they've ever written for us. So it took it to even another level, if that's possible. There's a little bit of an old school vibe to it as well, some of the riffs sound a little bit like a younger Cannibal. It's a good mix of newer and old."

It is the first Cannibal Corpse record in eight years to feature an album cover with graphic violence (the last being 2004's The Wretched Spawn). Although unlike other Cannibal Corpse covers where two would have to be illustrated - one censored and the other featuring the usual graphic violence - Torture includes a flap over the cover that depicts its graphic violence, which can only be opened once the product's plastic seal is removed. The Japanese version comes in a standard jewel box with a slip cover case to mimic the Digipak version of the uncensored international release.

== Music and lyrics ==
The material on Torture has been described as a modern take on the "classic" death metal style. According to Webster, "Even though we record to Pro Tools with a click track, I think we’ve learned how to use it in a way where everything still sounds organic. I feel like we managed to capture an old school death metal vibe. It doesn’t sound like one of those modern metal productions where everything is overly precise." According to Guitar World, "Torture is chockfull of extremely challenging technical passages, while at the same time delivering the blunt brutality of a classic death metal outfit. It’s tight as nails yet still organically loose, and somehow, always, terrifying." Paul Mazurkiewicz called the album "a good mix between Kill and Evisceration [Plague]."

Lyrically, the album has been described as "lightweight" compared to some of the band's previous releases. Themes explored on the album include disembowlment.

== Reception ==
Professional ratings
Aggregate scores
Source	Rating
Metacritic	81/100
Review scores
Source	Rating
AllMusic	4/5 stars
About.com	4/5 stars
The Austin Chronicle	4/5 stars
Blabbermouth.net	8/10
Consequence of Sound	3.5/5 stars
Metal Forces	7/10
Metal Hammer	4/5 stars
Metal Injection	8.5/10
PopMatters	8/10
Record Collector	4/5 stars

Torture received critical acclaim upon its release. Review aggregator Metacritic gave the album an 81 out of 100 based on seven reviews from professional critics.

Terrorizer gave the album a four out of five rating, noting that "Rob Barrett's vicious input and a welcome return of some manic Dark Angel riffing nevertheless makes this one a pick of the bunch, next to Kill" while also admitting "there are barely any surprises from seasoned death metal fans here".

Metal Hammer named "Scourge of Iron" number 5 on its list of "the 10 filthiest death metal riffs ever", calling it "the king of all dumb-dumb riffs".

== Track listing ==
No.	Title	Lyrics	Music	Length
1.	"Demented Aggression"	Paul Mazurkiewicz	O'Brien	3:14
2.	"Sarcophagic Frenzy"	Rob Barrett	Barrett	3:42
3.	"Scourge of Iron"	Alex Webster	Webster	4:44
4.	"Encased in Concrete"	Mazurkiewicz	Barrett	3:13
5.	"As Deep as the Knife Will Go"	Mazurkiewicz	O'Brien	3:25
6.	"Intestinal Crank"	Webster	Webster	3:54
7.	"Followed Home Then Killed"	Mazurkiewicz	O'Brien	3:36
8.	"The Strangulation Chair"	Webster	Webster	4:09
9.	"Caged... Contorted"	Barrett	Barrett	3:53
10.	"Crucifier Avenged"	Webster	Webster	3:46
11.	"Rabid"	Webster	Webster	3:04
12.	"Torn Through"	Mazurkiewicz	O'Brien	3:11
Total length:				43:51

German edition bonus tracks
No.	Title	Writer(s)	Length
13.	"Death Walking Terror" (live)	Webster	3:34
14.	"Make Them Suffer" (live)	Mazurkiewicz; O'Brien	3:08
15.	"Disfigured" (live)	George "Corpsegrinder" Fisher; Webster	3:29

== Credits ==
Cannibal Corpse

- George "Corpsegrinder" Fisher – vocals
- Pat O'Brien – lead guitar
- Rob Barrett – rhythm guitar
- Alex Webster – bass
- Paul Mazurkiewicz – drums

== Charts ==
Chart	Peak position
Austrian Albums (Ö3 Austria)	40
Belgian Albums (Ultratop Wallonia)	95
Finnish Albums (Suomen virallinen lista)	35
French Albums (SNEP)	139
German Albums (Offizielle Top 100)	40
Japanese Albums (Oricon)	23
Swedish Albums (Sverigetopplistan)	37
Swiss Albums (Schweizer Hitparade)	72
UK Independent Albums (Official Charts)	18
UK Rock & Metal Albums (Official Charts)	5
US Billboard 200	38
US Independent Albums (Billboard)	7
US Top Hard Rock Albums (Billboard)	3
US Top Rock Albums (Billboard)	12
US Indie Store Album Sales (Billboard)	4
