= Monolith of Death Tour '96–'97 =

Video by Cannibal Corpse
- Released: VHS: 1997; DVD: October 22, 2002
- Genre: Death metal
- Label: Metal Blade

Cannibal Corpse chronology
Monolith of Death Tour '96–'97 (00000001)	Live Cannibalism (2000)

Monolith of Death Tour '96–'97 is the first video album by American death metal band Cannibal Corpse. It was originally released in 1997 on VHS, but was re-released five years later on DVD in 2002. It features footage from various concerts during the Monolith of Death Tour.

== Track listing ==
1. Perverse Suffering
2. Monolith
3. Pulverized
4. Fucked With a Knife
5. Bloodlands
6. Gutted
7. A Skull Full of Maggots
8. Mummified In Barbed Wire
9. Orgasm Through Torture
10. Devoured by Vermin
11. Stripped, Raped and Strangled
12. Hammer Smashed Face

Tracks 1–4: Recorded on October 10, 1996, in Kraków, Poland
Track 5: Recorded on February 3, 1997, at Berkeley, California
Tracks 6–7: Recorded on June 4, 1996, in Montreal, Canada
Tracks 8–10: Recorded on February 2, 1997, in Hollywood, California
Tracks 11–12: Recorded on August 18, 1996, in San Francisco, California

== Special features ==
- Bonus interview footage
- Discography
- Photo gallery
- Uncensored video for "Devoured by Vermin"
