= Alex Webster =

American bassist (born 1969)

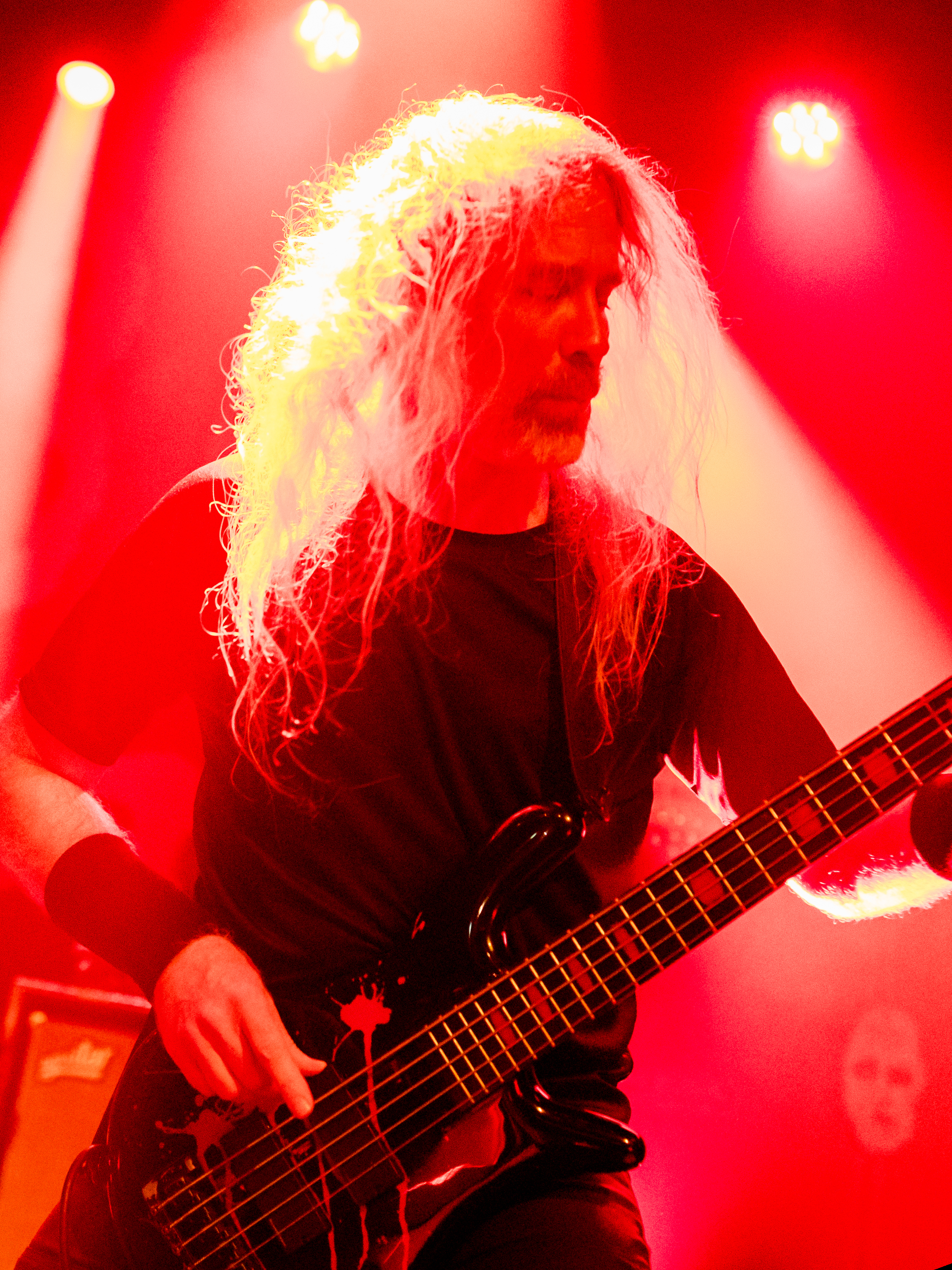
- Webster performing in 2025

Background information
- Born: October 25, 1969 (age 56); Akron, New York, U.S.
- Genres: Death metal; thrash metal; symphonic metal; progressive metal
- Occupations: Musician; songwriter
- Instrument: Bass guitar
- Years active: 1987–present
- Member of: Cannibal Corpse; Blotted Science; Conquering Dystopia
- Formerly of: Alas; Beyond Death; Hate Eternal
- Spouse: Alison Webster (m. 2001)

Alex Webster (born October 25, 1969) is an American musician who is the bassist and a co-founder of the death metal band Cannibal Corpse. He is one of two original remaining members, alongside drummer Paul Mazurkiewicz. He is also the bassist of Blotted Science and the supergroup Conquering Dystopia. Before Cannibal Corpse was formed, he was a member of Beyond Death.

== Musical career ==
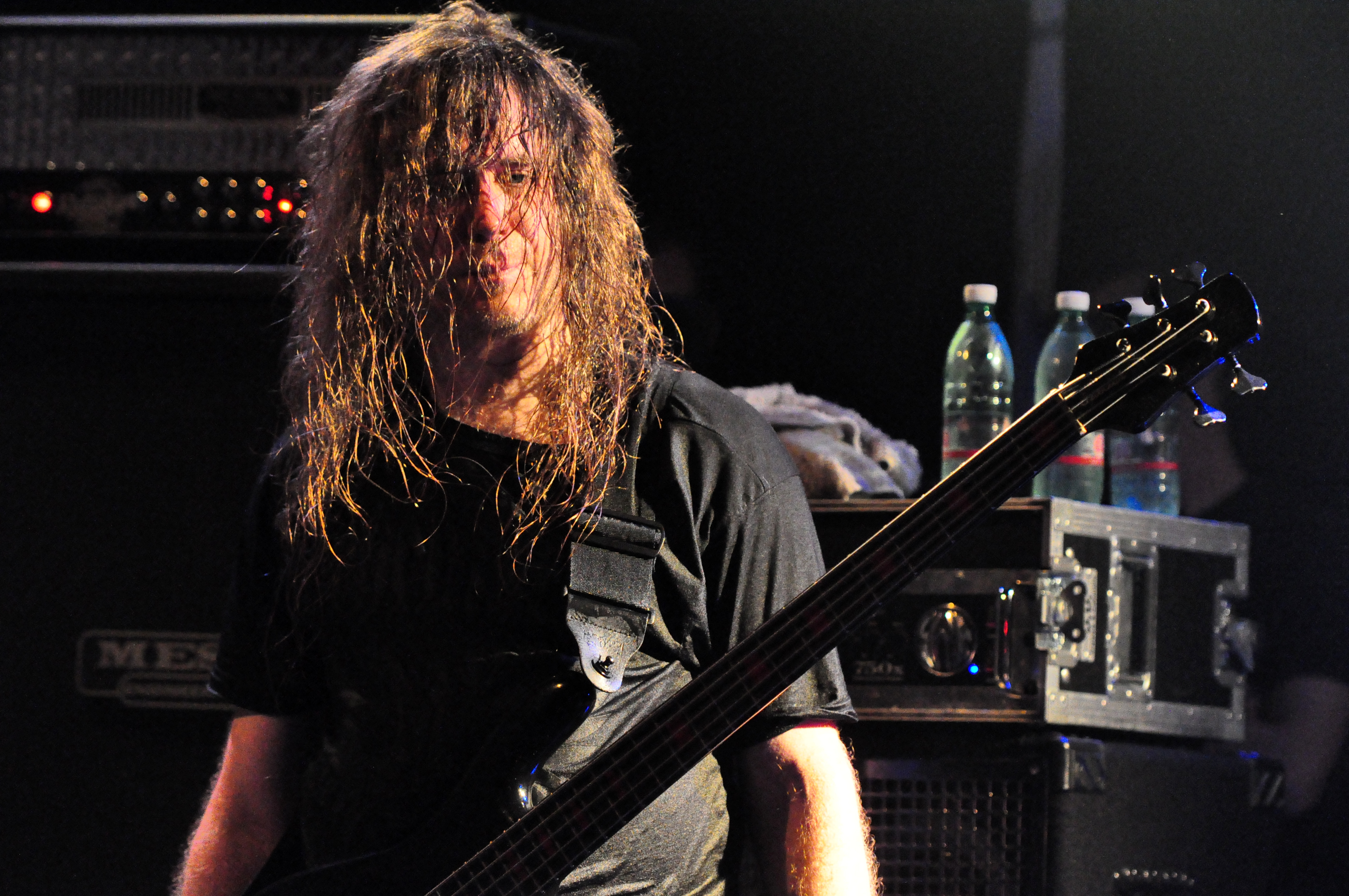
Webster in Rostock, 2012

Webster was born in Akron, New York. Webster was born into a musical family. Webster's father was partially of Scottish descent and played in a bagpipe band, performing in carnivals in various small towns. Webster's mother was a self-taught pianist. His experience performing music live was in a school talent show playing Bruce Springsteen and Bob Seger covers.

Webster was originally part of the band Beyond Death, with ex-Cannibal Corpse guitarist Jack Owen, in 1987. Both met up with Chris Barnes, Bob Rusay and Paul Mazurkiewicz, all of whom were in the band Tirant Sin. Webster was the one to come up with the band's name, Cannibal Corpse.

Webster recorded bass for Hate Eternal, Erik Rutan's death metal band.

In 2005, Alex was contacted by guitarist Ron Jarzombek about a possible collaboration which became Blotted Science, an all-instrumental extreme metal project. They released their debut album, The Machinations of Dementia, in the fall of 2007.

== Artistry ==
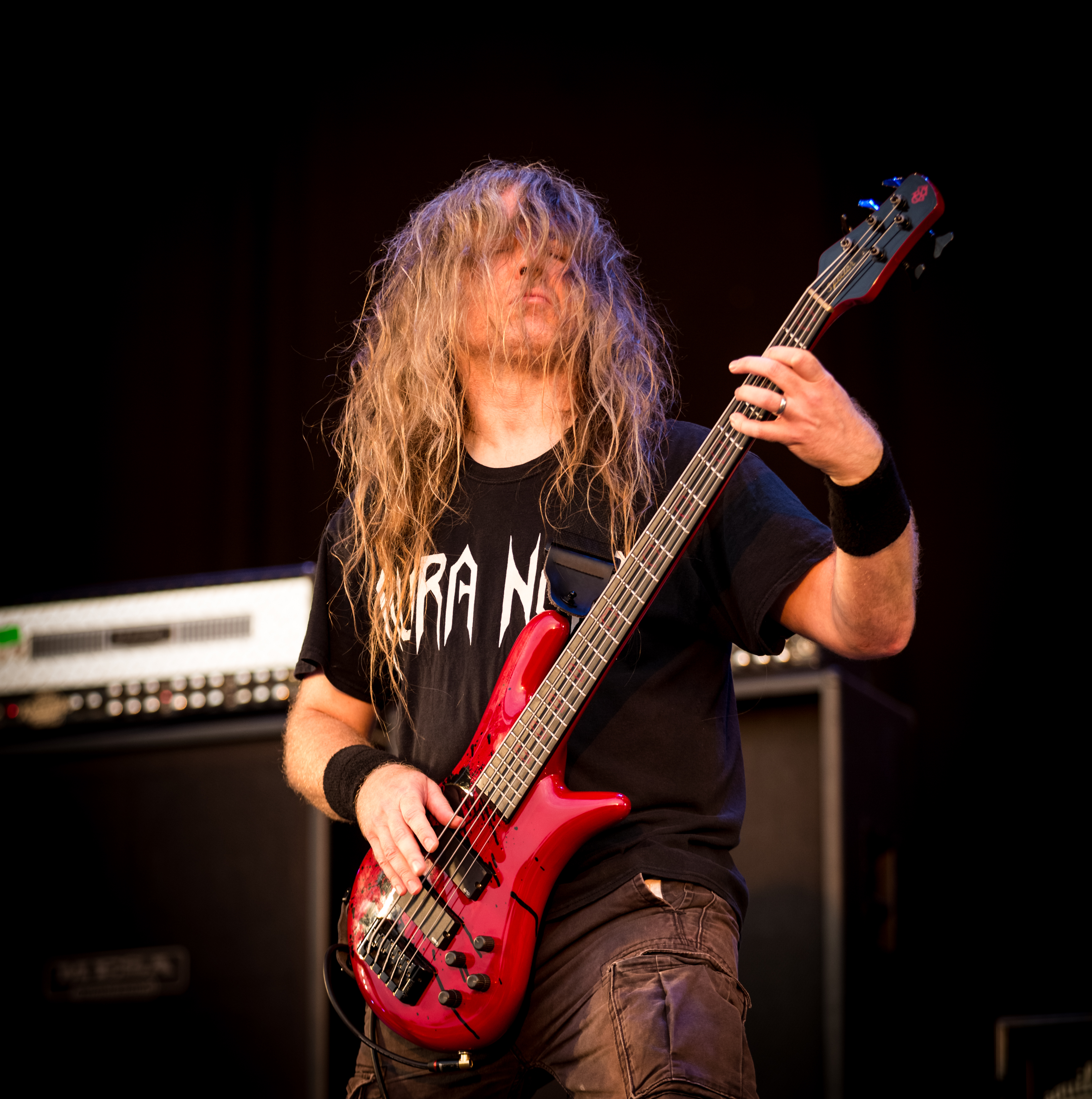
Webster performing at Wacken Open Air 2015

=== Bass playing style and lyrics ===
Webster's bass playing has been likened to "booming, sloppy spaghetti strings" by music news website MetalSucks. Unlike other extreme metal bassists, Webster does not use distortion or fuzz effects for his tone. He self-described his bass guitar sound as "a really aggressive clean tone." He plays bass with his fingers and never uses a pick.

Webster writes lyrics in Cannibal Corpse. He has utilized tools such as a thesaurus and a rhyming dictionary to assist him during the writing process. By 2014, he stopped using these tools, opting for a more organic process. He said in an interview: "I just use my own imagination, using things I guess I’ve absorbed over the years. I really try to keep it more simplistic in grammar these days. [...] I want my lyrics to be more organic and just more from words that I would use, and not words that I might not use in an everyday conversation."

=== Influences ===
Webster has cited Billy Sheehan, Geddy Lee, Cliff Burton, Steve Harris, and Steve Di Giorgio as influences on his bass playing. He has also expressed his fondness of Slayer, and that if any band could cover a Cannibal Corpse song, it would be Slayer. Webster's five all-time favorite albums are (in descending order) Accept's Restless and Wild, Morbid Angel's Altars of Madness, Metallica's Master of Puppets, Iron Maiden's Powerslave and Slayer's Reign in Blood, and, in a 2006 interview with LambGoat.com, Webster named his five favourite albums of the past five years as Spawn of Possession's Cabinet, Necrophagist's Epitaph, Aeon's Bleeding the False, Hate Eternal's I, Monarch, and Spastic Ink's Ink Compatible.

In addition to rock and heavy metal music, Webster has cited influence from classical music on his craft, such as 1812 Overture and the early work of Beethoven. He said, "that's really heavy stuff [...] you know, when those guys wanted to do heavy music, that was heavy before there were electric instruments. [...] You know, writing something heavy does not depend on electricity. One of the heaviest things out there [is] "The Planets" by Gustav Holst" [...] He wasn't letting the lack of gain or distortion get in the way of something super heavy!"

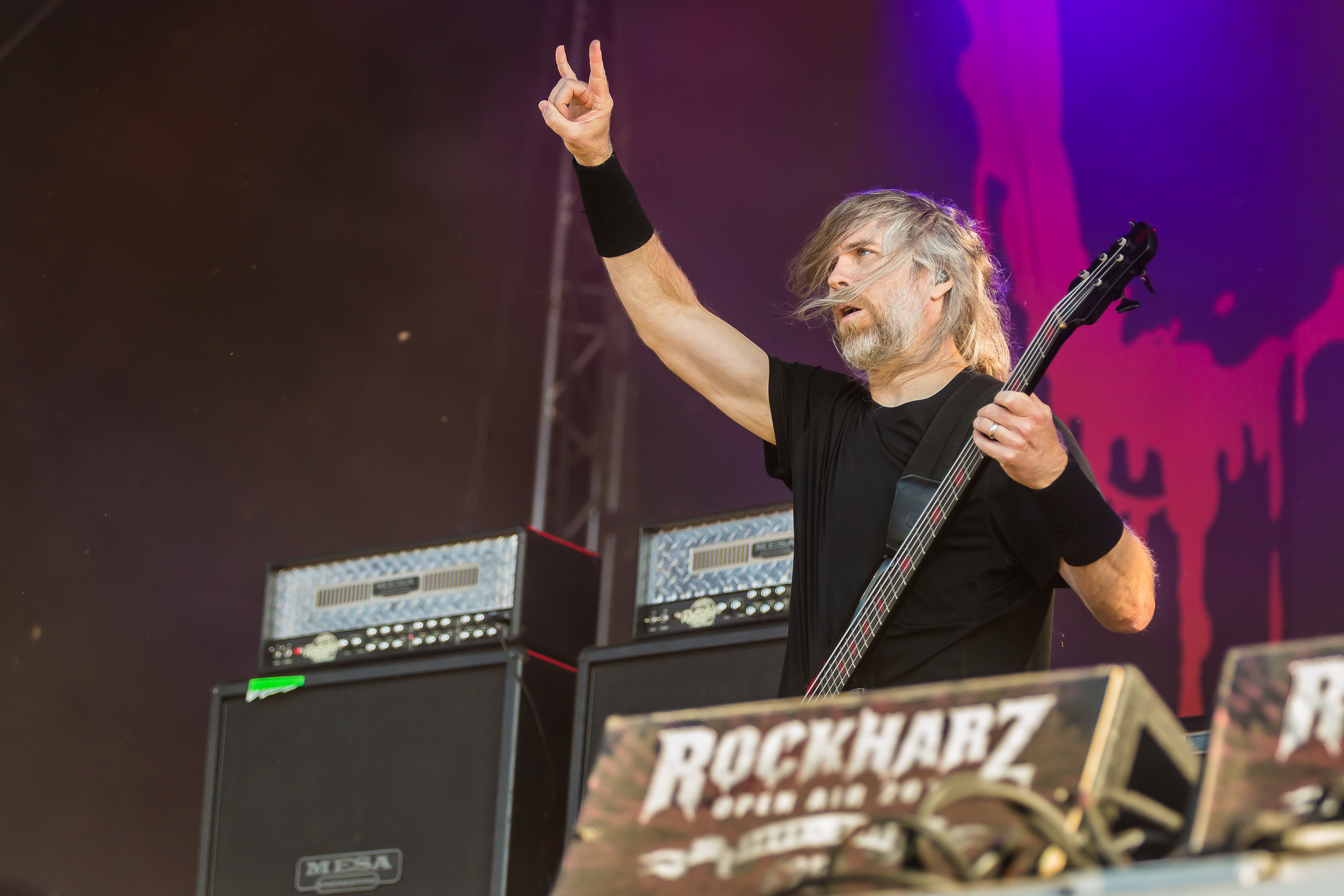
Webster performing at Rockharz Open Air 2018 in Ballenstedt, Germany.

When describing his relationship with music, he has stated "I just always liked music since I was a little kid. Music was always a soundtrack in my head to things going on in my life. I always wanted to play. I wanted to play drums when I was about three. I made a drum out of an old butter container and hit it with tinker toys. I was going to make music. Most people who are musicians didn't have to have anyone tell them to do it. I would never push music on someone, because it is something that doesn't need to be pushed. If you're going to make music, you're going to make it."

== Equipment ==
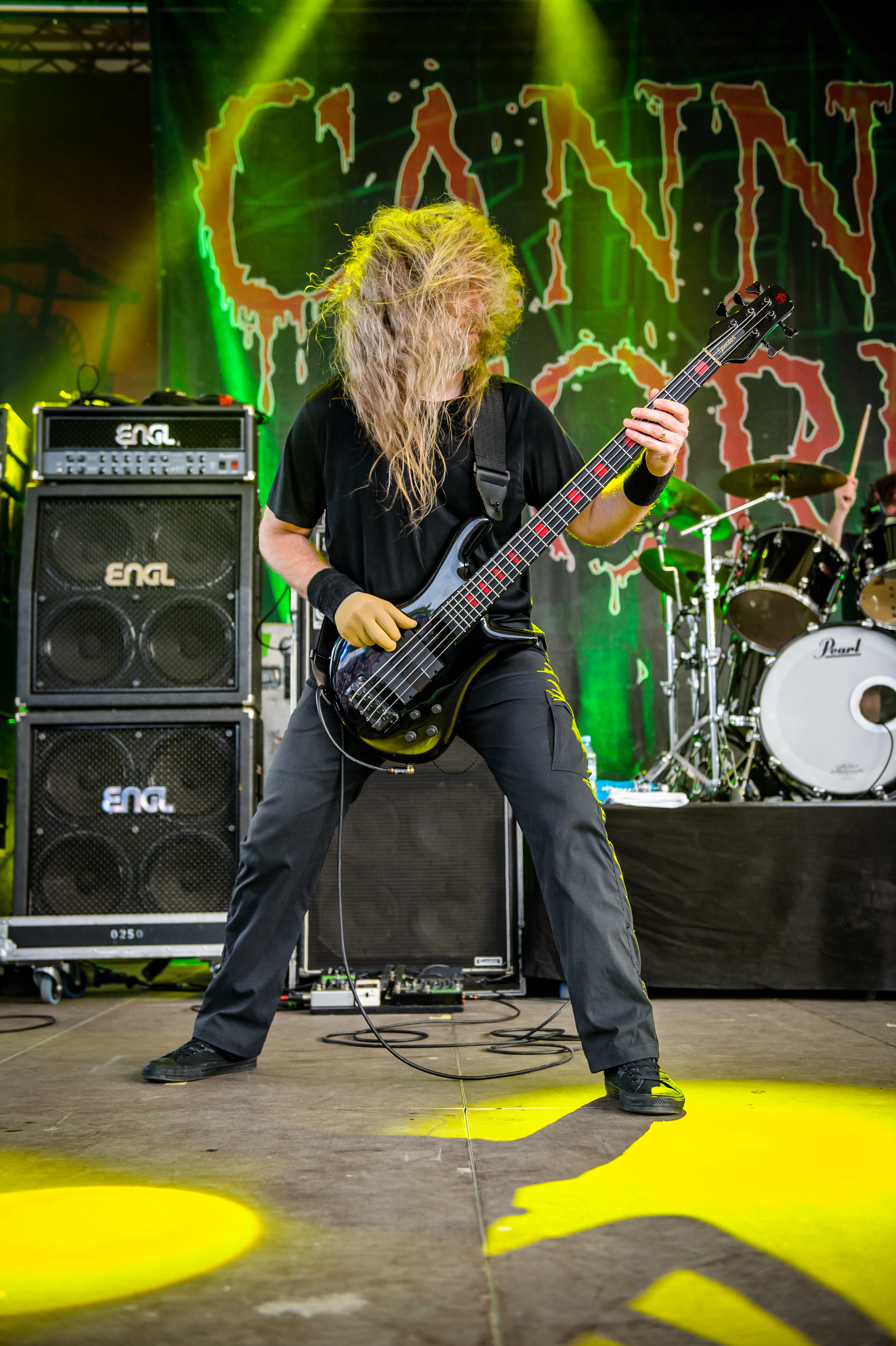
Webster performing at Gelsenkirchen RockHard Festival

Webster currently uses Spector 'Alex Webster Signature Edition' (based on Euro 5lx basses), DR Strings, and His signature Hammer Smashed Bass pickups by Seymour Duncan paired with a Darkglass Electronics tone capsule preamp wired for 18 volt operation.

On the first two Cannibal Corpse albums, Webster played a Fender Precision Bass that was purchased for him by his mother for his 19th birthday.

== Personal life and public image ==
Webster lives with his wife, Alison Webster in Oregon, U.S. He is agnostic, though he was "brought up with a fairly religious upbringing [which was] Protestant, Methodist".

Webster is known to enjoy an assortment of different physical activities, such as weightlifting, mountain biking, running and hiking. He told Decibel in 2022: "Death metal is one of the most physically demanding types of music, so for the musicians in it, they have to almost be thinking like an athlete to have longevity." Like Cannibal Corpse drummer Paul Mazurkiewicz, Webster is a vegetarian.

Aside from metal, Webster has also expressed a liking for Ohio New Wave band Devo, and, when asked what a musical guilty pleasure of his was, he replied "there's some good songs from the first No Doubt album".

He is known for his interaction with fans of the band, regularly answering questions on the band's forum. When asked about his favorite Cannibal Corpse song, Webster answered: "I don't know, it would be hard to choose one that's the "best", but one of my favorites is "From Skin to Liquid", mainly because it was so different for us. It showed we didn't necessarily have to be playing at warp drive and have gory lyrics to be heavy."

The prehistoric giant marine worm species Websteroprion armstrongi is partially named after Webster. Luke Parry, one of the scientists who described the species, said of the name, "Mats and I are both massive metalheads and think Alex Webster is a monstrously good bass player... (He) just seemed like the perfect fit for a giant worm with saw-like jaws."

== Discography ==
=== Cannibal Corpse ===
- Eaten Back to Life (1990)
- Butchered at Birth (1991)
- Tomb of the Mutilated (1992)
- The Bleeding (1994)
- Vile (1996)
- Gallery of Suicide (1998)
- Bloodthirst (1999)
- Gore Obsessed (2002)
- The Wretched Spawn (2004)
- Kill (2006)
- Evisceration Plague (2009)
- Torture (2012)
- A Skeletal Domain (2014)
- Red Before Black (2017)
- Violence Unimagined (2021)
- Chaos Horrific (2023)

=== Blotted Science ===
- The Machinations of Dementia (2007)
- The Animation of Entomology EP (2011)

=== Conquering Dystopia ===
  - Conquering Dystopia (2014)

== See also ==
- Florida death metal
