= Evisceration Plague =

Studio album by Cannibal Corpse
- Released: February 3, 2009
- Recorded: September–October, 2008
- Studios: Mana Recording Studios (St. Petersburg, Florida)
- Genre: Death metal
- Length: 38:45
- Label: Metal Blade
- Producer: Erik Rutan

Cannibal Corpse chronology
Kill (2006)	Evisceration Plague (2009)	Torture (2012)

Evisceration Plague is the eleventh studio album by American death metal band Cannibal Corpse. Released on February 3, 2009 by Metal Blade Records, the album was produced at Mana Recording Studios by Hate Eternal guitarist Erik Rutan.

The album entered the US Billboard 200 at number 66, selling 9,600 copies its first week.

== Background and recording ==
Bassist Alex Webster said about the record: In Cannibal Corpse, our goal has always been to try and make each new album we record our heaviest. That goal was a bit more challenging this time since we were extremely satisfied with our last album Kill, but we knew that by working with producer Erik Rutan at Mana Recording Studios again, we would be able to start at that same level of heaviness and take it even further... Evisceration Plague has the best guitar sound we've ever recorded, and the entire band has never played with more precision and power. In another interview with Terrorizer magazine, drummer Paul Mazurkiewicz stated his thoughts on the album saying: "I think working with Erik again has definitely brought things up a little for us. I mean all the band were involved in the writing process of this album along with Rutan and so I think this one's a tad more individual than Kill."

It was the first album in which Mazurkiewicz used a click track to record.

== Music ==
According to Greg Pratt of Exclaim!, the album continues in the style ss Kill, and contains "huge death metal songs". Drummer Paul Mazurkiewicz said, "Evisceration basically continued what we did on Kill. The only thing different is now we're refining a bit more so by incorporating a click track for the first time, writing and recording with that. We've never worked that way before. Now we're taking Kill, which I believe was a very savage and a very tight record, and now we're writing and recording to the click track, which is going to make it even more precise."

== Release and promotion ==
A video was produced for the song "Priests of Sodom". The video was released on March 25, 2010.

== Reception ==
Professional ratings
Review scores
Source	Rating
About.com	4/5 stars
AllMusic	3.5/5 stars
Blabbermouth.net	7.5/10
Exclaim!	positive
Exclaim!	positive
Metal Forces	8.5/10
Metal Storm	7.8/10
PopMatters	8/10 stars
Record Collector	4/4 stars
Sputnikmusic	4.0/5

Evisceration Plague received highly positive reviews from critics upon its release. Greg Prato of AllMusic awarded the album 3.5 stars out of 5, stating, "All the expected elements of a solid Cannibal Corpse recording are present -- metronome-like precision drumming, razor-sharp riffing, guttural growls akin to a caveman, and dark lyrics. Go ahead and take a pick of any of the tracks here ("Priests of Sodom," "To Decompose," the title track, etc.), and you're in for an intense metallic onslaught." Prato concluded that the album "shows that 11 studio releases into their career, Cannibal Corpse remain one gnarly group of metalheads."

Denise Falzon of Exclaim! also praised the album, stating that "in terms of technicality and style, Cannibal Corpse surpass expectations. With insanely fast drumming and some of the most threatening blast-beats imaginable, drummer Paul Mazurkiewicz delivers his finest performance yet. Guitarists Rob Barrett and Pat O'Brien shred through heavy riffs with supersonic speed, while bassist Alex Webster uses sporadic tempos, giving tracks like 'A Cauldron Of Hate' a menacing atmosphere. And George 'Corpsegrinder' Fisher's vocals are as merciless as ever." Falzon concluded, "Cannibal Corpse have remained consistent with their standard themes of death and mutilation, and the imagery of disembowelment continues with 'Beheading And Burning,' 'Shatter Their Bones' and the severely gruesome 'Skewered From Ear To Eye.'"

Mark Fisher of Metal Forces scored the album an 8.5/10, commenting, "There is something about the down-tuned, bent sound of the guitars as they spiral out of control, while the rhythm section holds the song together, that is entirely addictive. It’s like watching a train wreck; you just can’t pull yourself away from it." Fisher added, "The rest of the album is simply more pure brutality set to complex guitar work and groove-heavy rhythms, it’s formulaic at its core but it sets itself apart from the pack by the masterful musicianship of all involved."

== Track listing ==
No.	Title	Lyrics	Music	Length
1.	"Priests of Sodom"	Alex Webster	Webster	3:31
2.	"Scalding Hail"	Webster	Rob Barrett; Webster	1:46
3.	"To Decompose"	Paul Mazurkiewicz	Pat O'Brien	3:03
4.	"A Cauldron of Hate"	Webster	Webster	4:59
5.	"Beheading and Burning"	Webster	Webster	2:15
6.	"Evidence in the Furnace"	Webster	Webster	2:48
7.	"Carnivorous Swarm"	Mazurkiewicz	O'Brien	3:36
8.	"Evisceration Plague"	Webster	Webster	4:30
9.	"Shatter Their Bones"	Barrett	Barrett	3:35
10.	"Carrion Sculpted Entity"	Mazurkiewicz	Mazurkiewicz	2:33
11.	"Unnatural"	Webster	Webster	2:22
12.	"Skewered from Ear to Eye"	Webster	Webster	3:49
Total length:				38:45

European edition bonus track
No.	Title	Lyrics	Music	Length
13.	"Skull Fragment Armor"	Webster	Webster	2:10

== Credits ==
Writing, performance and production credits are adapted from the album liner notes.

=== Personnel ===
==== Cannibal Corpse ====
- George "Corpsegrinder" Fisher – vocals
- Pat O'Brien – lead guitar
- Rob Barrett – rhythm guitar
- Alex Webster – bass
- Paul Mazurkiewicz – drums

==== Guest musicians ====
- Erik Rutan – guitar solo on "Unnatural"

==== Production ====
- Erik Rutan – production, engineering, mixing
- Shawn Ohtani – additional engineering
- Brian Elliot – additional engineering
- Mike McCracken – studio drum assistant
- Alan Douches – mastering
- Neil Kernon – production, mixing only "Skull Fragment Armor"
- Justion Leeah – engineering only "Skull Fragment Armor"

==== Artwork and design ====
- Vincent Locke – cover art
- Brian Ames – design
- Alex Solca – photography

=== Studios ===
- Mana Recording Studios, St. Petersburg, FL, USA – recording, mixing
- West Westside Music – mastering
- Sonic Ranch, Tornillo, TX, USA – recording only "Skull Fragment Armor"

== Charts ==
Chart	Peak position
Austrian Albums (Ö3 Austria)	41
Belgian Albums (Ultratop Wallonia)	71
Finnish Albums (Suomen virallinen lista)	25
German Albums (Offizielle Top 100)	42
Japanese Albums (Oricon)	200
UK Independent Albums (Official Charts)	22
UK Rock & Metal Albums (Official Charts)	17
US Billboard 200	66
US Independent Albums (Billboard)	6
US Top Hard Rock Albums (Billboard)	7
US Top Rock Albums (Billboard)	22
US Indie Store Album Sales (Billboard)	7
