= A Skeletal Domain =

Studio album by Cannibal Corpse
- Released: September 16, 2014
- Recorded: February–May 2014
- Studios: Audiohammer Studios, Sanford, FL
- Genre: Death metal
- Length: 43:52
- Label: Metal Blade
- Producer: Mark Lewis

Cannibal Corpse chronology
Torture (2012)	A Skeletal Domain (2014)	Red Before Black (2017)

Professional ratings
Review scores
Source	Rating
AllMusic	3.5/5 stars
Angry Metal Guy	3/5 stars
Exclaim!	8/10
The Guardian	4/5 stars
Metal Forces	8/10
Metal Hammer	neutral
Metal Storm	7.9/10
Revolver	4/5
Sputnikmusic	4.0/5

A Skeletal Domain is the thirteenth studio album by American death metal band Cannibal Corpse. Released on September 16, 2014 by Metal Blade Records, the album was produced at Audiohammer Studios by Mark Lewis.

The album entered the US Billboard 200 at number 32, making it Cannibal Corpse's highest charting album on the Billboard 200 to date. 8,825 copies were sold in its first week.

== Music ==
Prior to the album's release, bassist Alex Webster commented that the album's sound was turning out to be more "dark and eerie" than the band's usual output. He also commented that while he believes fans enjoy the band's consistency, the band explores new ground on the album.

== Track listing ==
No.	Title	Lyrics	Music	Length
1.	"High Velocity Impact Spatter"	Paul Mazurkiewicz	Pat O'Brien	4:06
2.	"Sadistic Embodiment"	Mazurkiewicz	O'Brien	3:17
3.	"Kill or Become"	Rob Barrett	Barrett	3:50
4.	"A Skeletal Domain"	Mazurkiewicz	O'Brien	3:38
5.	"Headlong into Carnage"	Webster	Webster	3:01
6.	"The Murderer's Pact"	Webster	Webster	5:05
7.	"Funeral Cremation"	Mazurkiewicz	O'Brien	3:41
8.	"Icepick Lobotomy"	Barrett	Barrett	3:16
9.	"Vector of Cruelty"	Webster	Webster	3:25
10.	"Bloodstained Cement"	Webster	Webster	3:41
11.	"Asphyxiate to Resuscitate"	Mazurkiewicz	Barrett, Mazurkiewicz	3:47
12.	"Hollowed Bodies"	Mazurkiewicz	O'Brien	3:05
Total length:				43:52

"Icepick Lobotomy" is labelled as "Ice-Pick Lobotomy" in the album's liner notes.

== Credits ==
Writing, performance and production credits are adapted from the album liner notes.

=== Personnel ===
==== Cannibal Corpse ====
- George "Corpsegrinder" Fisher – vocals
- Pat O'Brien – lead guitar
- Rob Barrett – rhythm guitar
- Alex Webster – bass
- Paul Mazurkiewicz – drums

==== Production ====
- Mark Lewis – recording, production, engineering, mixing

==== Visual art ====
- Vince Locke – cover art
- Brian Ames – layout
- Alex Morgan – photography

== Charts ==
Chart (2014)	Peak position
Austrian Albums (Ö3 Austria)	28
Belgian Albums (Ultratop Wallonia)	128
Finnish Albums (Suomen virallinen lista)	26
French Albums (SNEP)	127
German Albums (Offizielle Top 100)	21
Japanese Albums (Oricon)	129
Swiss Albums (Schweizer Hitparade)	50
UK Albums (Official Charts)	165
UK Independent Albums (Official Charts)	26
UK Rock & Metal Albums (Official Charts)	6
US Billboard 200	32
US Independent Albums (Billboard)	5
US Top Hard Rock Albums (Billboard)	3
US Top Rock Albums (Billboard)	7
US Indie Store Album Sales (Billboard)	7
