= Rob Barrett =

American musician (born 1970)

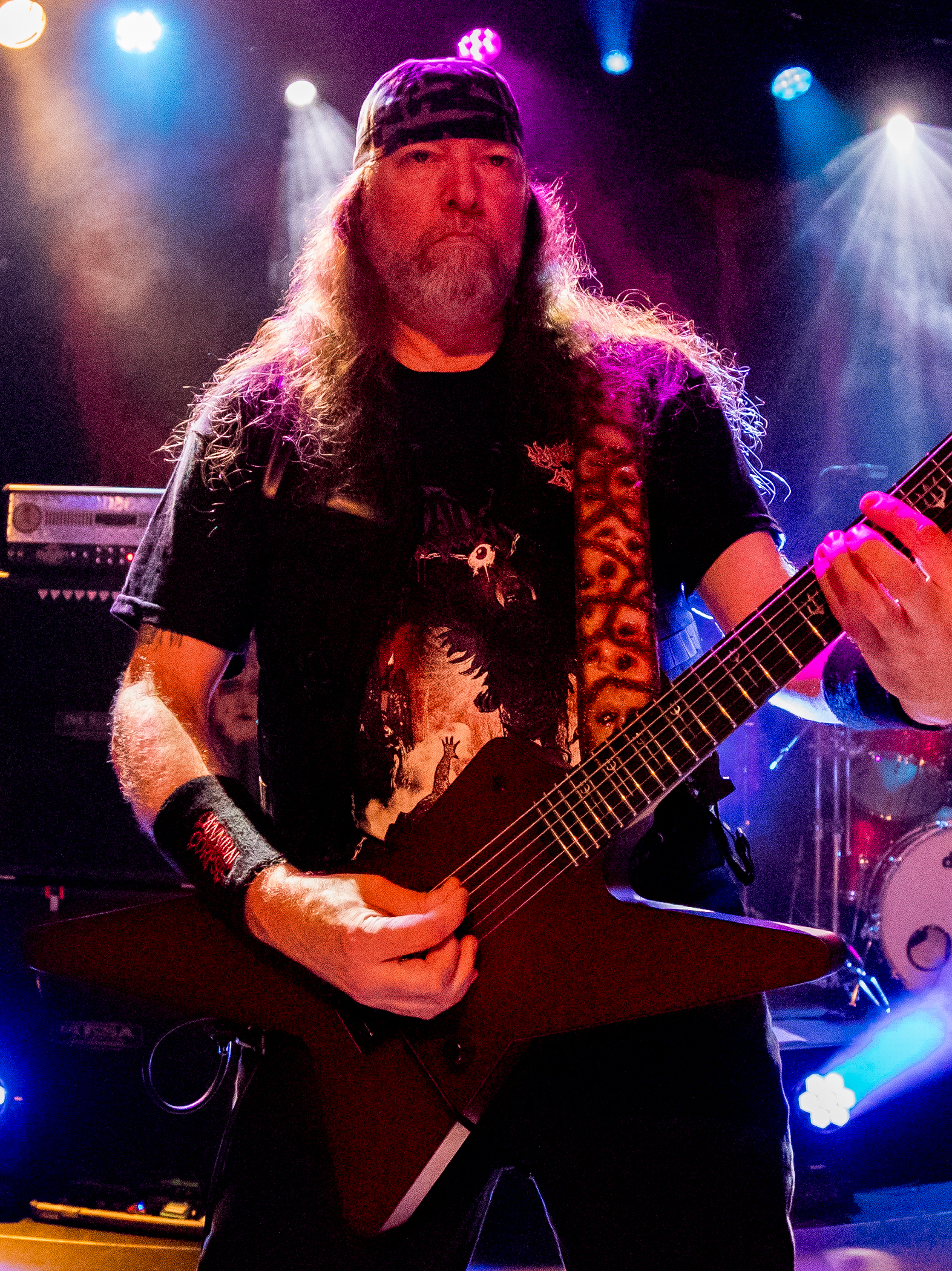
- Barrett in 2024

Background information
- Born: Robert Joseph Barrett III; January 29, 1970 (age 56); Buffalo, New York, U.S.
- Genres: Death metal; thrash metal
- Occupations: Musician; songwriter
- Instrument: Guitar
- Years active: 1990–present
- Member of: Cannibal Corpse
- Formerly of: Solstice; Malevolent Creation

Robert Joseph Barrett III (born January 29, 1970) is an American death metal musician, best known as the current rhythm guitarist for Cannibal Corpse. He played with the band from 1993 to 1997 and rejoined in 2005. He has cited Gary Moore, Malcolm Young, Randy Rhoads, Eddie Van Halen, Tony Iommi and Steve Vai, among others, as his influences. He currently resides in Nashville, Tennessee.

== Career ==
Barrett was born in Buffalo, New York. Barrett started playing guitar at age 15, and his brother’s friend sold him his first guitar for $30. It was a flying-V shape. He started his professional career in 1990 when he formed the band Solstice with drummer Alex Marquez and guitar player Dennis Muñoz. The band recorded a demo in 1991 produced by Jim Morris and signed a record deal with the German label SPV/Steamhammer. In 1992 they released their debut album entitled Solstice (the name changed to "The Sentencing" on some pressings). That same year, Barrett and Marquez decided to join Malevolent Creation after their previous drummer and second guitar player didn't show up to a rehearsal, putting Solstice on hiatus. They took part on the recording of Retribution and toured with the band.

=== Cannibal Corpse ===
In February 1993, Barrett was contacted by Alex Webster and asked to join Cannibal Corpse a few months following the release of Tomb of the Mutilated, as a guitar fill-in for Bob Rusay. Barrett had known the band prior due to their mutual locality, and from their bands sharing a van together on a previous tour. Barrett commented in a 1993 interview, "The kids in Europe were disappointed about it, 'cause [they were like], 'What happened to Bob?! He was the brutal-ist!' So I kind of had my work cut out for me, you know?" He stayed with the band for the subsequent tours and eventually became a permanent member. He recorded the 1994 album The Bleeding and the 1996 album Vile. He also made a brief cameo appearance with the band in the 1994 film Ace Ventura: Pet Detective starring Jim Carrey. In 1997, Barrett left Cannibal Corpse due to musical differences and was replaced by Pat O'Brien. Barrett rejoined Malevolent Creation in 1997, staying with the band for seven years. Barrett returned to Cannibal Corpse in 2005, replacing Jack Owen. Since then, he has been featured on the albums Kill, Evisceration Plague, Torture, A Skeletal Domain, Red Before Black, Violence Unimagined and Chaos Horrific.

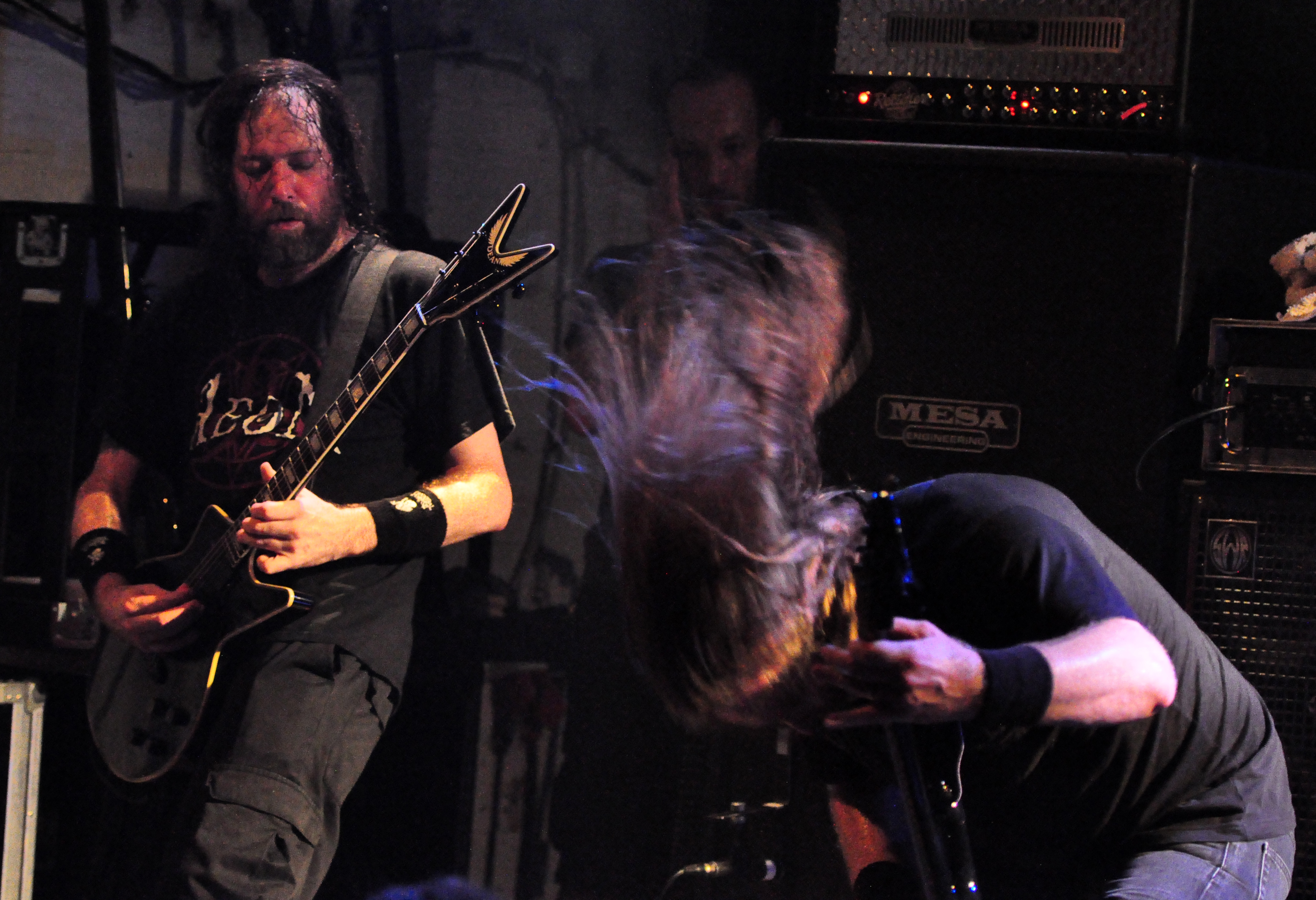
Barrett and Alex Webster

=== HatePlow ===
In late 1994 right after Malevolent Creation recorded their third album, Barrett formed the death metal band HatePlow with guitarist Phil Fasciana and late drummer "Crazy" Larry Hawke, both members of Malevolent Creation. Barrett was the original vocalist, the band eventually got Kyle Symons to join on vocals due to Barrett's commitment to Cannibal Corpse Although HatePlow was intended initially as mere a fun side-project, the trio recorded a four-song demo that enjoyed a wide spread throughout the underground trading circuit. After his departure from Cannibal Corpse Barrett extended his commitment to Malevolent Creation & HatePlow and participated in the recording of the albums Everybody Dies and The Only Law Is Survival which came out in 1998 and 2000 respectively. In 2004, he left HatePlow. The same year Barrett left, the "Moshpit Murder" compilation was released which features tracks recorded live during "The Only Law Is Survival" U.S tour with Stormtroopers Of Death in 2000, tracks from their 1996 demo, and one song from their 1999 demo that was done with a drum machine.

=== Collaborations and side-projects ===
Since the 2000s Barrett has made a few guest appearances, providing extra guitar playing for bands such as Eulogy, Hollenthon, Infernäl Mäjesty, Pro-Pain and Unearthed. In 2005 Barrett joined in on the recording of the Roadrunner United album The All-Star Sessions where he played guitar on the tracks "Annihilation by the Hands of God" and "Constitution Down".

In 2019, Rob Barrett recorded with death metal band Deicide for a tribute album for the 40th anniversary of the Dayglo Abortions titled "Fuck The World If It Can't Take a Joke". The track recorded was "Inside My Head" from their 1985 release Feed Us a Fetus.

In the mid-2000s, Barrett planned on starting a hardcore band with J.C. Dwyer on drums and Jonathan Buske on bass. It is currently unknown if a name was decided or if any recordings exist.

== Equipment ==
=== Guitars ===
Barrett is currently endorsed by Dean Guitars and uses their custom guitars, mainly Cadillac's but also V's and Z's. All of his guitars are equipped with either an EMG set or a Fishman Fluence set and are tuned to A# and G# Standard, he also tunes his guitars like the top 6 strings of a 7 string guitar. Around 2007 Dean Guitars produced a signature model in limited numbers called the Cadi-Kill. In the past Barrett used to play two Gibson Les Paul's, a Jackson Dinky, briefly a B.C. Rich Bich, a Custom ESP M-1, and a Charvel 475 that was also in Ace Ventura: Pet Detective, the Charvel featured stickers from bands such as Black Flag, Biohazard, Slapshot, Wasted Youth and Dead Kennedys. His Les Pauls are now only used for studio recording. He now uses Fishman Fluence pickups in his signature guitars.

=== Amplifiers ===
Like O'Brien, Barrett uses Mesa/Boogie amplifiers, such as the Dual Rectifier (old 2-channel version), Triple Rectifier and, more recently, Mark V. For cabinets, he uses Crate, Marshall, and Mesa/Boogie 4x12s, which are loaded with Celestion Vintage 30 speakers. Before Mesa/Boogie, Barrett used Crate and Marshall amplifiers.

=== Effects and accessories ===
Barrett runs a few pedals, namely an ISP Technologies Decimator noise gate, Boss MT-2 Metal Zone, Boss TU-2 Chromatic Tuner and a Maxon ST-9 pro+ Super tube. The units are connected with Monster cables.

== Discography ==
Solstice

- 1991: Demo
- 1992: Solstice

Malevolent Creation

- 1992: Retribution
- 1998: The Fine Art of Murder
- 2000: Envenomed
- 2002: The Will to Kill
- 2004: Warkult

Cannibal Corpse

- 1994: The Bleeding
- 1996: Vile
- 2006: Kill
- 2009: Evisceration Plague
- 2012: Torture
- 2014: A Skeletal Domain
- 2017: Red Before Black
- 2021: Violence Unimagined
- 2023: Chaos Horrific

Eulogy

- 2010: Burden of Certainty (demo)

HatePlow

- 1996: Demo
- 1998: Everybody Dies
- 2000: The Only Law Is Survival
- 2004: Moshpit Murder

=== Guest appearances ===
Hollenthon

- 2001: With Vilest of Worms to Dwell

Infernäl Mäjesty

- 2007: Demon God (EP)

Pro-Pain

- 2008: No End in Sight

Roadrunner United

- 2005: The All-Star Sessions

Unearthed

- 2007: Imposition of Faith
