= Boss SD-1 =

Guitar overdrive pedal

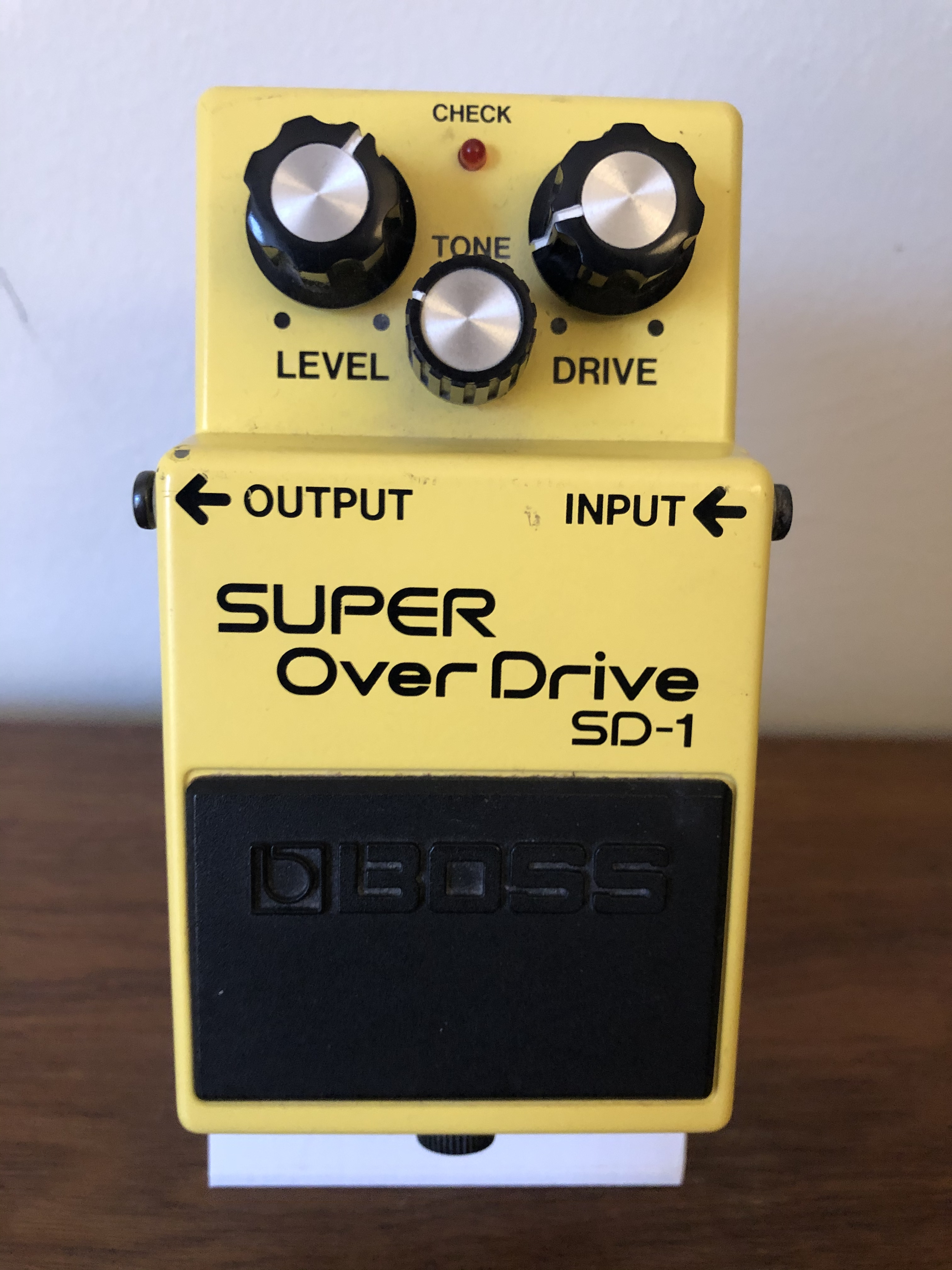
- Brand: Boss
- Manufacturer: Roland Corporation
- Dates: 1981–present

Technical specifications
- Effects type: Overdrive pedal

Controls
- Pedal control: Level, Tone, Drive

Input/output
- Inputs: Mono
- Outputs: Mono

The SD-1 Super Overdrive is the second overdrive pedal made by the Boss Corporation. Released in 1981 and produced continuously since, the SD-1 was an update to the brand's influential OD-1 Overdrive, adding a tone control and refining its predecessor's circuit for more gain and aggression in its voicing. The changes made the SD-1 especially popular within the growing hard rock and heavy metal subgenres upon its release, with guitarists frequently using it to boost already-distorted amplifiers like the Marshall JCM800. The SD-1's design has remained unchanged since its debut, and it remains a pedalboard staple among both amateur and professional players.

== History ==
Following the releases of the MXR Distortion+ and DOD Overdrive 250 Preamp, both of which combined newly-available op amps with hard-clipping diodes to create distortion, Boss sought a way to achieve a more faithful imitation of power amp distortion through a compact effects pedal of its own. Boss soon patented a unique, asymmetrical soft-clipping design and released the OD-1 Overdrive in 1977, in doing so pioneering the "overdrive" pedal market. However, like the Distortion+ and 250 Preamp before it, the OD-1 featured only level and gain controls, with no option to individually adjust the pedal's EQ behavior. The Ibanez Tube Screamer, which was inspired by the OD-1 but utilized symmetrical clipping to avoid Boss' patent, included a tone knob upon its release in 1979 and quickly became the dominant overdrive pedal on the market. In 1981, Boss released the SD-1 Super Overdrive as their direct competitor to Ibanez's pedal.

== Design ==
The SD-1 carried over the OD-1 Overdrive's compact yellow case and Boss' asymmetrical soft-clipping design, with the asymmetry creating both even and odd order harmonics for a more layered distortion. Like Boss' other compact pedals, the SD-1 has a buffered bypass and runs on a 9v battery or equivalent power supply. The SD-1's largest outward departure from its predecessor is the inclusion of a "Tone" control, in addition to controls for output volume ("Level") and gain (now labeled "Drive" compared to the OD-1's "Over Drive"). The soft-clipping circuit too came with several alterations. Most notable among them is the use of two diodes to clip the waveform's positive amplitude peak and a single diode for the negative, meaning the signal's wave peaks are clipped differently. This leads to a "slightly more harmonically interesting sound" with accentuated even-order harmonics and what is thought to be a more accurate replication of tube amp distortion, as this method of clipping better replicates a tube amp's push/pull circuit in which no two tubes are ever perfectly matched. The clipping's updated placement earlier in the circuit also introduces a "slightly jagged, granular drive tone" that helps the affected guitar tone stand out. Tonally, the SD-1 remains midrange-focused (centered around 800Hz) but has less bass roll-off than the OD-1, making for a fuller sound than the OD-1 or Tube Screamer.

In use, the SD-1 adds grit and saturation to both clean and overdriven amps with the gain control set high, while in contrast Ibanez's Tube Screamer is often used more as a boost for its volume and EQ curve with the gain set low. Adding drive with the SD-1 to an already overdriven amp became especially popular in the 1980s in the growing hard rock and heavy metal subgenres, with guitarists frequently using the SD-1 in front of amps like the Marshall JCM800 for more distortion.

== Legacy ==
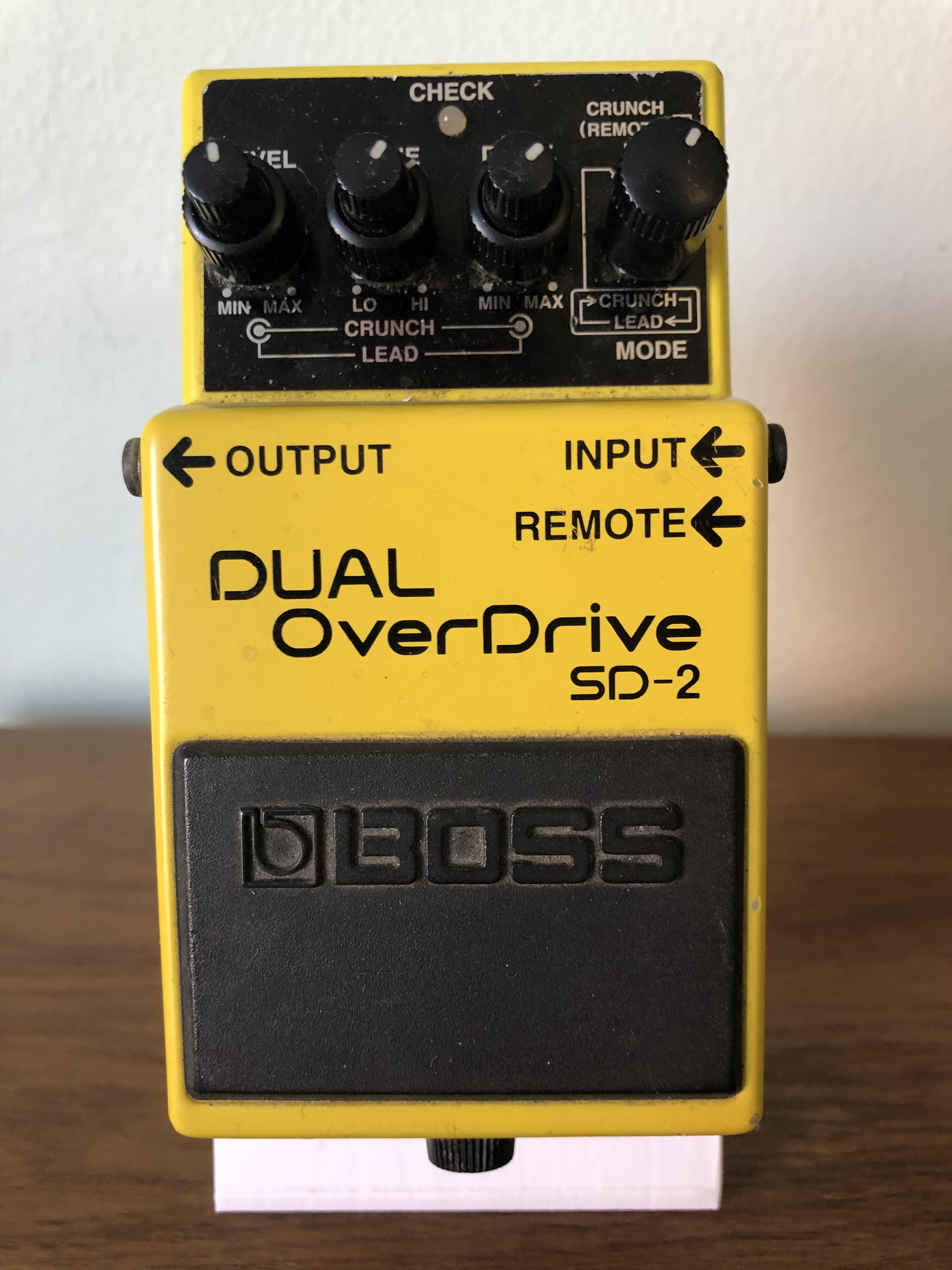
Boss SD-2 Dual Overdrive

The SD-1 is notable as a staple budget offering—frequently chosen as a guitarist's first overdrive—that is also widely popular among professional guitarists. Users include Jimmy Page, David Gilmour, Kirk Hammett, Steve Vai, Zakk Wylde, Jonny Greenwood, Josh Homme, Mark Knopfler, Prince, and the Edge. The SD-1 is often praised for its durability, low price (retailing for under $70), and overdrive character, which pairs well with a variety of amps and music genres. As a result, the SD-1 has been one of the industry's best-selling pedals for decades.

In 2014, Boss introduced a high-end "Waza Craft" edition of the pedal, the SD-1W, which features upgraded components and a custom mode that produces a smoother distortion with more sustain and fullness. This was followed in 2021 by a 40th anniversary edition of the SD-1 (with an inverted color scheme), with the original circuit having remained unchanged since its introduction. Guitar dubbed the pedal one of only a handful to ever achieve "truly iconic status."

Between 1993 and 1998, Boss produced a more complex update to the SD-1, the SD-2 Dual Overdrive. It had two channels, Crunch and Lead, and stacked Level, Tone, and Drive controls for each. The SD-2 also offered users the ability to toggle between channels using an external footswitch.

== See also ==
- Analog.Man King of Tone
- Boss BD-2
- Klon Centaur
- List of distortion pedals
