= Fury & Flames =

Studio album by Hate Eternal
- Released: February 19, 2008
- Genre: Death metal
- Length: 39:55
- Label: Metal Blade
- Producer: Erik Rutan

Hate Eternal chronology
I, Monarch (2005)	Fury & Flames (2008)	Phoenix Amongst The Ashes (2011)

Professional ratings
Review scores
Source	Rating
About.com	4.5/5 stars
AllMusic	3.5/5 stars
Lambgoat	9/10 stars

Fury & Flames is the fourth studio album by the band Hate Eternal and their debut album on Metal Blade Records. The album features the addition of new members Shaune Kelley as second guitarist and Jade Simonetto on drums, while bass guitarist Alex Webster (Cannibal Corpse, Blotted Science) returns to replace Randy Piro. Cover art by Paul Romano (Mastodon, Animosity, The Red Chord). The album has had a lot of praise for the album's heaviness and emotion. Erik Rutan, the band's frontman, says he put a lot of emotion into the album because of the death of his friend Jared Anderson who played bass for the band.

This was the first time since Ripping Corpse's Dreaming with the Dead album that Shaune Kelley and Erik Rutan played guitar on the same album.

== Track listing ==
1. "Hell Envenom" - 4:09
2. "Whom Gods May Destroy" - 3:41
3. "Para Bellum" - 4:29
4. "Bringer of Storms" - 5:18
5. "The Funerary March" - 4:15
6. "Thus Salvation" - 3:57
7. "Proclamation of the Damned" - 4:13
8. "Fury Within" - 3:33
9. "Tombeau (Le Tombeau de la Fureur et Des Flammes)" - 4:41
10. "Coronach" - 1:39

== Personnel ==
Hate Eternal

- Erik Rutan - lead guitar, vocals
- Alex Webster - bass
- Shaune Kelley - rhythm guitar
- Jade Simonetto - drums

Production

- Erik Rutan - production, mixing, engineering
- Shawn Ohtani - engineering
- Alan Douches - mastering

Artwork

- Alex McKnight - photography
- Paul Romano - artwork
