= Phoenix Amongst the Ashes =

Phoenix Amongst The Ashes

Studio album by Hate Eternal
- Released: May 10, 2011
- Genre: Death metal
- Length: 41:06
- Label: Metal Blade
- Producer: Erik Rutan

Hate Eternal chronology
Fury & Flames (2008)	Phoenix Amongst The Ashes (2011)	Infernus (2015)

Professional ratings
Review scores
Source	Rating
About.com	3.5/5 stars
AllMusic	4.5/5 stars
Angry Metal Guy	4.5/5 stars

Phoenix Amongst The Ashes is the fifth album by the band Hate Eternal, released on May 10, 2011. Frontman Erik Rutan commented that "the band has come up with one of [their] heaviest, most twisted, evil, melodic, and insane albums yet". The album was recorded in MANA Recording Studios.

== Track list ==
No.	Title	Length
1.	"Rebirth" (instrumental)	1:17
2.	"The Eternal Ruler"	3:10
3.	"Thorns of Acacia"	4:29
4.	"Haunting Abound"	5:01
5.	"The Art of Redemption"	4:42
6.	"Phoenix Amongst the Ashes"	5:42
7.	"Deathveil"	3:31
8.	"Hatesworn"	4:48
9.	"Lake Ablaze"	4:29
10.	"The Fire of Resurrection"	3:57
Total length:		41:06

== Personnel ==
- Erik Rutan - guitars, vocals
- JJ Hrubovcak - bass
- Jade Simonetto - drums
