= Jared Anderson =

Jared Anderson may refer to:

- Jared Anderson (Christian musician) (born 1979), American musician and Christian worship leader
- Jared Anderson (heavy metal musician) (1974–2006), American death metal musician
- Jared Anderson (boxer) (born 1999), American boxer
