= Dim Mak (disambiguation) =

Dim Mak may refer to:

- Dim Mak, the "Touch of Death" pressure-points attacks in Wuxia martial arts
- Dim Mak (band), an American death-metal band
- Dim Mak Records, an American recording label
