= Inevitable Collapse in the Presence of Conviction =

Studio album by Soilent Green
- Released: April 15, 2008
- Recorded: Mana Records, Florida
- Genre: Sludge metal, grindcore
- Length: 41:25
- Label: Metal Blade
- Producer: Erik Rutan

Soilent Green chronology
Confrontation (2005)	Inevitable Collapse in the Presence of Conviction (2008)

Professional ratings
Review scores
Source	Rating
AllMusic	link
Blabbermouth.net	8/10
The Collector's Guide to Heavy Metal	8/10

Inevitable Collapse in the Presence of Conviction is the fifth studio album by American extreme metal band Soilent Green, released through Metal Blade Records on April 15, 2008. It was produced by Erik Rutan of Hate Eternal.

== Track listing ==
No.	Title	Length
1.	"Mental Acupuncture"	4:08
2.	"Blessed in the Arms of Servitude"	2:15
3.	"In the Same Breath"	3:59
4.	"Antioxidant"	4:10
5.	"Lovesick"	4:01
6.	"Rock Paper Scissors"	3:13
7.	"Superstition Aimed at One's Skull"	4:00
8.	"For Lack of Perfect Words"	3:45
9.	"When All Roads Lead to Rome"	3:39
10.	"All This Good Intention Wasted in the Wake of Apathy"	4:32
11.	"A Pale Horse and the Story of the End"	3:43
Total length:		41:25

Japanese bonus track
No.	Title	Length
12.	"Legions of Death" (Exhorder cover)	4:27

- Track 10 was written in the early 1990s when Glenn Rambo was still alive and a member.

== Personnel ==
Soilent Green

- L. Ben Falgoust II – vocals
- Brian Patton – guitars
- Scott Crochet – bass
- Tommy Buckley – drums

Production

- Erik Rutan – producer, engineering, mixing
- Shawn Ohtani – engineering
- Brian Elliot – assistant engineer
