= Infernus (disambiguation) =

Infernus is a Norwegian black metal musician and founding member of Gorgoroth.

Infernus may also refer to:

- Infernus (album), an album by Hate Eternal
- Infernus, a Subskimmer-like submersible developed by students in Sweden

== See also ==
- Inferius, a type of animated corpse in the Harry Potter franchise
- Inferno (disambiguation)
