= Winter Hours =

Winter Hours may refer to:

- Winter Hours, an album by American metal band Tombs
- Winter Hours, an alternative rock band from New Jersey
