= Into the Moat =

American mathcore band

- Origin: Fort Lauderdale, Florida, U.S.
- Genres: Mathcore, metalcore, progressive death metal
- Years active: 2001–present
- Labels: Lovelost, Metal Blade
- Members: Matthew Gossman; Kit Wray; Earl Ruwell IV; Nick "The Greek" Ziros
- Past members: Johannes "Hon-Hon" Naranjo; Josh Thiel; Rob Shaffer; Steve Walbroehl; Jose Escobar; Travis LeVrier

Into the Moat is an American mathcore band from Fort Lauderdale, Florida. It achieved national acclaim when profiled in Alternative Press magazine in November 2003. The band signed with Metal Blade Records, which released both of their full-length albums, and completed four national tours during 2004 and 2005.

== History ==
The band started in 2001 as Matthew Gossman's one-man project. He played guitar, bass and drums on the first demo. In January 2002, bassist Johannes Naranjo (since departed) and Wray moved to guitar.

Within a year, the group recorded the EP Means by Which the End is Justified. Engineered by Jeremy Staska at Studio 13, Lovelost Records "discovered" the album after a song on the group's website drew their interest. With an informal agreement, Lovelost Records released the EP in May 2003. The EP and brief promotional tours led the band to signed with metal label Metal Blade, which released their first full-length album, The Design, in March 2005. It was produced at Mana Recording Studios by Erik Rutan (Hate Eternal, Morbid Angel). Rob Shaffer left the band the same year. He joined Dark Castle.

The Campaign, nearly four years in the making, was produced and mixed by Rutan at Mana Recording Studios and mastered by Alan Douches. It was released in March 2009 to positive reviews.

Into the Moat remained silent until a 2016 interview with Sheeps X Clothing where they revealed that the band was done. Metal Blade reportedly claimed that one record was left to be completed.

== Members ==
=== Current ===
- Matthew Gossman – drums
- Kit Wray – guitars
- Earl Ruwell IV – vocals
- Nick "The Greek" Ziros – bass

=== Former ===
- Johannes "Hon-Hon" Naranjo – bass
- Josh Thiel – bass (2005)
- Rob Shaffer – guitars (Dark Castle)
- Steve Walbroehl – guitars (2001–2003)
- Jose Escobar – bass (ex-Radiation4)
- Travis LeVrier – guitars (ex-Entheos, ex-Scale the Summit)

== Discography ==
Studio albums

- The Design (Metal Blade, 2005)
- The Campaign (Metal Blade, 2009)

EPs

- Means by Which the End Is Justified (Lovelost, 2003)

Demo albums

- 2-song demo (2002) (self-released)
- 3-song demo (2003) (self-released)

== Articles ==
- Bowar, C (No. 29). "Into the Moat: The Design". Outburn p 81.
- Burgess, Aaron (V. 19 No. 200, March 2005). "100 Bands You Need To Know In 2005: Into the Moat". Alternative Press p 114.
- Burgess, Aaron (V.19 No. 202, May 2005). "Into the Moat". Alternative Press p 144.
- Dick, Chris (August 2005). "Into the Moat-Review". Metal Maniacs p 60.
- Fletcher, Andrew (No. 18, 2005). "Into the Moat". Explicitly Intense p 10.
- Glasper, Ian (No. 130, April 2005). "Into the Moat: The Design". Terrorizer p 76.
- "Low Profile"(feature auth not ident) (No. 184, Nov 2003). "6 More to Watch: Into the Moat". Alternative Press p 28.
- Mick, S (April–May 2005). "Into the Moat". AMP, p 219.
- Szpirko, Andrew (No. 6, 2005). "Interview with Matt Gossman-Into the Moat". Violence magazine pp 22–23.
