= Dechristianization (disambiguation) =

Dechristianisation, de-Christianization, or dechristianize may also refer to:

- Secularization
- Anti-Christian Movement
- Decline of Christianity in the Western world
- Dechristianization of France during the French Revolution.
- Conversion of non-Islamic places of worship into mosques
- Dechristianize (album), of 2003 by U.S. death metal band Vital Remains
