= Conquering the Throne =

Studio album by Hate Eternal
- Released: November 2, 1999
- Recorded: February–May 1999
- Genre: Death metal
- Length: 32:03
- Label: Earache Records
- Producer: Erik Rutan

Hate Eternal chronology
Conquering the Throne (1999)	King of All Kings (2002)

Professional ratings
Review scores
Source	Rating
Allmusic	link

Conquering the Throne is the debut studio album by American death metal band Hate Eternal. It was released on November 2, 1999 on Wicked World Records, a subdivision of Earache Records.

The album cover is from the right portion (Hell) of Hans Memling's painting The Last Judgment. Drummer Tim Yeung made his recording debut on this album.

== Track listing ==
All songs written by Erik Rutan, except for where noted.

1. "Praise of the Almighty" – 2:38
2. "Dogma Condemned" – 3:00
3. "Catacombs" – 3:16
4. "Nailed to Obscurity" (Doug Cerrito) – 2:22
5. "By His Own Decree" – 3:25
6. "The Creed of Chaotic Divinity" – 2:58
7. "Dethroned" (Cerrito) – 2:36
8. "Sacrilege of Hate" – 2:22
9. "Spiritual Holocaust" (Cerrito) – 3:27
10. "Darkness by Oath" – 4:11
11. "Saturated in Dejection" – 3:08

== Credits ==
- Erik Rutan - guitar, lead vocals
- Jared Anderson - bass, backing vocals
- Tim Yeung - drums
- Doug Cerrito - guitar
