= Icons of Evil =

Studio album by Vital Remains
- Released: April 3, 2007
- Recorded: December 2006
- Studios: Mana Studio, in St. Petersburg, Florida
- Genre: Brutal death metal
- Length: 67:19
- Label: Century Media
- Producer: Erik Rutan

Vital Remains chronology
| Horrors of Hell (2006) | Icons of Evil (2007) |

Professional ratings
Review scores
| Source | Rating |
|---|---|
| AllMusic | 4/5 stars |
| Blabbermouth | (7.5/10) |

Icons of Evil is the sixth studio album by the American death metal band Vital Remains. It was released in April 2007. The sample in "Where is Your God Now" is taken from the Mel Gibson film The Passion of the Christ and from William Peter Blatty's The Exorcist. Icons of Evil is the last album to feature vocalist Glen Benton and guitarist Dave Suzuki.

The album cover art is actually a modified depiction from a scene in the film The Passion of the Christ where Jesus is nailed to the cross.

== Track listing ==
All tracks are written by Tony Lazaro and Dave Suzuki.

| No. | Title | Length |
|---|---|---|
| 1. | "Where Is Your God Now" | 1:54 |
| 2. | "Icons of Evil" | 7:35 |
| 3. | "Scorned" | 8:42 |
| 4. | "Born to Rape the World" | 8:11 |
| 5. | "Reborn... the Upheaval of Nihility" | 7:43 |
| 6. | "Hammer Down the Nails" | 6:12 |
| 7. | "Shrapnel Embedded Flesh" | 6:48 |
| 8. | "'Til Death" | 9:14 |
| 9. | "In Infamy" | 6:17 |
| 10. | "Disciples of Hell" (Yngwie Malmsteen cover) | 4:54 |
| Total length: | | 67:19 |

== Personnel ==
Vital Remains

- Tony Lazaro – rhythm guitar, bass
- Dave Suzuki – lead guitar, drums
- Glen Benton – vocals

Production

- Shawn Ohtani – engineer
- Erik Rutan – producer, engineer
- Alan Douches – mastering
- Kris Verwimp – artwork, cover art
