= Savage Gold =

- Album cover artwork by Thomas Hooper

Studio album by Tombs
- Released: June 10, 2014
- Recorded: November 2013 – January 2014
- Studio: Mana Recording Studios; St. Petersburg, FL
- Genre: Avant-garde metal, post-metal, black metal
- Length: 57:12
- Label: Relapse Records
- Producer: Erik Rutan

Tombs chronology
| Path of Totality (2011) | Savage Gold (2014) |

Professional ratings
Aggregate scores
| Source | Rating |
|---|---|
| Metacritic | 76/100 |
Review scores
| Source | Rating |
| About.com | 4/5 stars |
| Exclaim! | 8 |
| Metalsucks | 4/5 stars |
| Pitchfork | 8.3 |
| Punknews.org | 4/5 stars |
| Revolver | 4/5 |
| Spin | 8 |

Savage Gold is the third studio album from American metal band Tombs. It marks the groups first record to feature contributions from guitarist Garett Bussanick and bassist Ben Brand, as well as the first record to be produced by Erik Rutan.

== Writing and composition ==
Material for the record was written by principal songwriters Mike Hill and Andrew Hernandez II over the span of three years following the release of Path of Totality. Hill has characterized the material as "darker and more extreme" than Path of Totality. Hill also stated that the instrumental interactions for the record are "straightforward and a little dryer" compared to previous releases, with the intention of increasing the impact of the lyrics and music.

== Recording ==
Recording was completed by producer Erik Rutan at Mana Recording Studios. Hill described the recording process as "grueling", but effective in reaching the intended result. Rutan was said to be primarily focused on the technical aspects of recording while the band focused entirely on the creative aspects of the music.

== Release and promotion ==
The album will be released on June 10, 2014, through Relapse Records in CD, 2XLP, deluxe 2XLP, and digital download formats. The track "Edge of Darkness" was made available for streaming on April 22, 2014, and was subsequently given the "Best New Track" distinction by Pitchfork writer Grayson Currin. On May 5, 2014, the track "Deathtripper" was made available for streaming via The A.V. Club.

== Reception ==
Thus far, the album has been unanimously praised by music critics. The aggregate review site Metacritic assigned an average score of 85 out of 100 to the album based on 4 reviews, indicating "Universal Acclaim".

In a positive review, Dave Schalek of About.com named Savage Gold "their heaviest album to date." Commenting on the album's production, Pitchfork characterized the album's sound as a "...cohesive, propulsive, and definitive statement." Similarly, Joe Pelone of Punknews.org described the album as "pristine" and "decimating", concluding "It is, simply, the best Tombs record so far."

== Track listing ==
| No. | Title | Length |
|---|---|---|
| 1. | "Thanatos" | 4:25 |
| 2. | "Portraits" | 6:50 |
| 3. | "Seance" | 5:29 |
| 4. | "Echoes" | 7:56 |
| 5. | "Deathtripper" | 6:44 |
| 6. | "Edge of Darkness" | 5:28 |
| 7. | "Ashes" | 5:03 |
| 8. | "Legacy" | 4:18 |
| 9. | "Severed Lives" | 4:42 |
| 10. | "Spiral" | 6:17 |
| Total length: | | 57:12 |

== Personnel ==
Savage Gold album credits adapted from Allmusic.

Tombs

- Mike Hill – guitar, electronics, vocals
- Andrew Hernandez II – drums
- Garett Bussanick – guitar
- Ben Brand – bass, electronics

Additional personnel

- Sera Timms – guitar, vocals
- J. Bennett – guitar, vocals
- Erik Rutan – production, mixing
- Bryan – assistant engineer
- Alan Douches – mastering
- Thomas Hooper – album artwork

== Charts ==
| Chart | Peak position |
|---|---|
| Billboard Top Heatseekers | 14 |
