= Confrontation (Soilent Green album) =

Studio album by Soilent Green
- Released: July 19, 2005
- Recorded: January 2005
- Studio: Mana Recording Studios, Tampa
- Genre: Sludge metal, grindcore
- Length: 59:54
- Label: Relapse
- Producer: Erik Rutan, Soilent Green

Soilent Green chronology
A Deleted Symphony for the Beaten Down (2001)	Confrontation (2005)	Inevitable Collapse in the Presence of Conviction (2008)

Professional ratings
Review scores
Source	Rating
AllMusic	3.5/5 stars
The Collector's Guide to Heavy Metal	8/10

Confrontation is the fourth studio album from the Louisiana-based extreme metal band Soilent Green. It is the last Soilent Green album released under the Relapse Records label.

== Track listing ==
1. "Scarlet Sunrise" – 1:03
2. "Leaves of Three" – 3:13
3. "A Scream Trapped Under Water" – 5:02
4. "Forgive & Regret" – 2:15
5. "12 oz. Prophet" – 2:41
6. "Southern Spirit Suite" – 0:35
7. "Pretty Smiles & Shattered Teeth" – 4:39
8. "Liquor & Cigarettes" – 0:46
9. "Theory of Pride in Tragedy" – 5:03
10. "Fingernails on a Chalkboard" – 3:27
11. "Paper Cut" – 0:58
12. "They Lie to Hide the Truth" – 4:42
13. "Another Cheap Brand of Luck" – 0:32
14. "This Glass House of Broken Words" – 2:42
15. "A Permanent Solution to a Temporary Problem" – 21:56

== Personnel ==
- Louis Benjamin Falgoust II – vocals
- Brian Patton – lead guitar
- Tony White – rhythm guitar
- Scott Crochet – bass
- Tommy Buckley – drums
- Josh Galeos – mixing
