= King of All Kings (Hate Eternal album) =

Studio album by Hate Eternal
- Released: 16 September 2002
- Recorded: March 2002
- Genre: Death metal
- Length: 33:48
- Label: Earache Records
- Producer: Erik Rutan

Hate Eternal chronology
Conquering the Throne (1999)	King of All Kings (2002)	I, Monarch (2005)

Professional ratings
Review scores
Source	Rating
AllMusic	3/5 stars

King of All Kings is the second album by Florida death metal band Hate Eternal. It was released on September 16, 2002, by Earache Records and, like their debut, produced by the band's frontman Erik Rutan. This is the last album to feature bassist Jared Anderson.

== Style ==
King of All Kings is stylistically similar to its predecessor, Conquering the Throne. It has been classified as "extreme grind/metal." The album's style is characterized as a "messy, rhythmic cacophony of growls, blast beats, and noisy guitars." The album's lyrics are said to "[salute] all that which is evil." Derek Roddy's blast beats have been described as sounding "relentless."

== Reception and legacy ==
Revolver included King of All Kings in a list of essential albums from the Florida death metal scene. In his review of the album, Jason D. Taylor of AllMusic praised its musicianship and production, but criticized the lack of variety between its tracks. He said, "Despite its weaknesses, it is evident that Rutan and company are slowly striding forth with their own signature sound, and now that Hate Eternal is Erik Rutan's main focus, one should expect even more grandiose grindcore on future releases."

== Track listing ==
All songs by Erik Rutan except when noted.

1. "Our Beckoning" – 0:49
2. "King of All Kings" – 2:49 (Rutan, Anderson)
3. "The Obscure Terror" – 3:53
4. "Servants of the Gods" – 2:56
5. "Beyond Redemption" – 3:08 (Rutan, Anderson)
6. "Born by Fire" – 3:43 (Rutan, Anderson)
7. "Chants in Declaration" – 4:05
8. "Rising Legions of Black" – 3:24 (Rutan, Anderson)
9. "In Spirit (The Power of Mana)" – 4:31
10. "Powers That Be" – 4:30

== Personnel ==
- Erik Rutan - guitars, lead vocals
- Jared Anderson - bass, backing vocals
- Derek Roddy - drums
