= Sewn Mouth Secrets =

Studio album by Soilent Green
- Released: October 6, 1998
- Recorded: May 22 – June 1, 1998
- Genre: Sludge metal, grindcore
- Length: 45:46
- Label: Relapse; Hydra Head (vinyl)
- Producer: Keith Falgout, Soilent Green

Soilent Green chronology
Pussysoul (1995)	Sewn Mouth Secrets (1998)	A Deleted Symphony for the Beaten Down (2001)

Professional ratings
Review scores
Source	Rating
AllMusic	4.5/5 stars
Collector's Guide to Heavy Metal	8/10
Kerrang!	3/5 stars

Sewn Mouth Secrets is the second studio album from American extreme metal band Soilent Green. It was released on October 6, 1998.

== History ==
Sewn Mouth Secrets was Soilent Green's first full-length album to be released on Relapse Records. They had already worked with the label for their previous EP A String of Lies. It was recorded in 1998, on May 22 through June 1; it was produced by Keith Falgout and Soilent Green. It was mixed during the June 20 and 21 of the same year at Festival Studios by Keith Falgout and the band. It was mastered by Dave Shirk at Sonorous Mastering, Inc., in Tempe, Arizona. The album was finally released on October 6, 1998. Scott Hull remastered the album at Visceral Sound for a compilation with the EP A String of Lies which was released on October 11, 2005.

The album was generally well received. It was given a 4.5 out of 5 by William York of AllMusic, who called it "the band's strongest effort to date." It made Rolling Stone call Soilent Green one of the "ten most important hard and heavy bands right now" and was 18th on Terrorizer's top albums of 1998.

== Music and artwork ==
The record features Soilent Green's mixture of grindcore and sludge metal. According to William York from AllMusic, "each song is a nonstop sequence of constantly morphing riffs and assaultive, split-personality vocals, leaving listeners little chance to catch their breaths." Throughout, frontman Ben Falgoust alternates between black metal screams; a hardcore-derived, semi-barking voice; spoken word passages; and death growls. According to York, "his varied vocals, together with his sadistic lyrics, make for a frightening and intense presence." During the album the band uses Southern-flavored rock grooves, blast beats, moments very complex musically and Black Sabbath-inspired riffs. There are a few quiet moments, like the intros on "Build Fear" and "Her Unsober Ways."

Although not credited, Phil Anselmo provided backing vocals on the album. He is given thanks in the liner notes.

The cover of the album is based on a picture by Alfons Mucha.

== Track listing ==
All songs by Soilent Green. (Note: The album's liner notes don't show the actual authorship of any of the tracks.)

1. "It Was Just an Accident" – 4:12
2. "So Hatred" – 3:48
3. "Build Fear" – 2:48
4. "Looking Through Nails" – 3:03
5. "Breed in Weakness" – 4:13
6. "Cold-Steel Kiss" – 3:37
7. "Openless" – 0:26
8. "Her Unsober Ways" – 4:03
9. "Sewn Mouth Secrets" – 5:24
10. "Walk a Year in My Mind" – 5:10
11. "Gagged Whore" – 4:23
12. "Emptiness Found" – 3:42
13. "Sticks and Stones" – 0:53

== Personnel ==
- Louis Benjamin Falgoust II – vocals
- Brian Patton – lead guitar
- Donovan Punch – rhythm guitar
- Scott Williams – bass
- Tommy Buckley – drums
- Keith Falgout – producer, mixer
- Dave Shirk – mastering
