= Forever Underground =

Studio album by Vital Remains
- Released: March 25, 1997
- Genre: Death metal
- Length: 42:37
- Label: Osmose Productions
- Producers: Vital Remains & Rudy D'Agostino

Vital Remains chronology
Into Cold Darkness (1995)	Forever Underground (1997)	Dawn of the Apocalypse (2000)

Professional ratings
Review scores
Source	Rating
Allmusic	3/5 stars

Forever Underground is the third album by the US death metal band Vital Remains. It was released in 1997 by Osmose Productions. The first album to feature guitarist Dave Suzuki and the only one to feature bassist Joe Lewis on vocals. The original 1997 vinyl pressing of this album is extremely rare, as only about 1000 copies were made.

== Track listing ==
- All Songs Written By Vital Remains, except where noted.

No.	Title	Music	Length
1.	"Forever Underground"		9:17
2.	"Battle Ground"		6:49
3.	"I Am God"		9:37
4.	"Farewell to the Messiah"	Lazaro	1:30
5.	"Eastern Journey"		7:17
6.	"Divine in Fire"		8:11
Total length:			42:37

== Personnel ==
- Joseph "Joe" Lewis - vocals, bass
- Tony Lazaro - rhythm guitar
- Dave Suzuki - lead guitar, drums
