= Pussysoul =

Studio album by Soilent Green
- Released: February 14, 1995
- Recorded: 1994
- Genres: Grindcore, sludge metal
- Length: 47:20
- Label: Dwell
- Producer: Soilent Green

Soilent Green chronology
Pussysoul (1995)	Sewn Mouth Secrets (1998)

Professional ratings
Review scores
Source	Rating
AllMusic	3/5 stars

Pussysoul is the debut studio album by American extreme metal band Soilent Green. It is the band's first and last album released through Los Angeles based record label Dwell Records. In 2005 Pussysoul was re-mastered and reissued through Dwell Records.

== Track listing ==
1. "Thirteen Days a Weak" – 4:37
2. "Slapfuck" – 3:31
3. "Falling from a 65 Story Building" – 3:27
4. "Lips as So of Blood" – 4:03
5. "The Wrong of Way" – 3:55
6. "Needlescrape" – 6:04
7. "Zebra Zombies" – 3:04
8. "Keep Crawling" – 5:05
9. "Twitch of an Eye" – 4:09
10. "Golfers Just Love Punishment" – 5:02
11. "Love None" – 0:51
12. "Branding of Thieves" – 3:28

== Personnel ==
- Ben Falgoust II – vocals
- Brian Patton – lead guitar
- Donovan Punch – rhythm guitar
- Scott Williams – bass
- Tommy Buckley – drums
