= Fear Is the Weapon =

Fear Is The Weapon

Compilation album by Tombs
- Released: November 2, 2010
- Genre: Avant-garde metal, post-metal, black metal
- Length: 58:09
- Label: Relapse Records CD (RR7122)
- Producer: Mike Hill

Tombs chronology
Winter Hours (2009)	Fear Is The Weapon (2010)	Path of Totality (2011)

Professional ratings
Review scores
Source	Rating
Punknews.org	3.5/5 stars

Fear Is The Weapon is a compilation album from American metal band Tombs. The compilation includes tracks off of their self-titled EP, split EP, and demos from the Winter Hour sessions. It was released through Relapse Records on November 2, 2010, in CD and digital download formats. The CD release was limited to 1,000 copies.

== Track listing ==
No.	Title	Length
1.	"Fountain of the World 666"	2:53
2.	"Course of Empire"	4:41
3.	"Cavaire"	3:54
4.	"Marina"	2:16
5.	"Monuments"	2:39
6.	"Darker Than Your Nights"	5:17
7.	"Hallways of the Always"	3:15
8.	"Cypress"	7:10
9.	"Gods of Love and Suicide"	3:16
10.	"Cheval Noir"	2:26
11.	"Gossamer (demo version)"	4:47
12.	"Merrimack (demo version)"	3:46
13.	"Beneath the Toxic Jungle (demo version)"	5:34
14.	"Filled With Secrets (demo version)"	6:15
Total length:		58:09

== Personnel ==
Tombs

- Mike Hill - guitars, vocals
- Dominic Seita - bass (tracks 1–7)
- Carson Daniel James - bass (tracks 8–14)
- Justin Ennis - drums

Additional musicians

- Josh Graham - guitar on Marina
- April Goettle - vocals on Chevel Nor

Production

- Mike Hill - audio mixing, production
- Graham Goldman - mastering

Art

- Ryan Begley - album artwork
- Jacob Speis - addition album artwork, layout
