= A Deleted Symphony for the Beaten Down =

Studio album by Soilent Green
- Released: September 18, 2001
- Recorded: Balance Studios in Mandeville, Louisiana
- Genre: Sludge metal, grindcore
- Length: 33:28
- Label: Relapse
- Producer: Dave Fortman, Soilent Green

Soilent Green chronology
Sewn Mouth Secrets (1998)	A Deleted Symphony for the Beaten Down (2001)	Confrontation (2005)

Professional ratings
Review scores
Source	Rating
AllMusic	4.5/5 stars
Rock Hard	8.5/10 stars
Chronicles of Chaos	7.5/10 stars

A Deleted Symphony for the Beaten Down is the third full-length album by the New Orleans-based extreme metal band Soilent Green, released on September 18, 2001, through Relapse Records. The original title of this album was The Devil Wears a Lamb's Skin.

== Track listing ==
No.	Title	Length
1.	"Hand Me Downs"	2:16
2.	"A Grown Man"	3:01
3.	"Swallowhole"	5:48
4.	"Afterthought of a Genius"	3:40
5.	"An Addicts' Lover"	2:06
6.	"Later Days"	3:32
7.	"Clockwork of Innocence"	2:53
8.	"Daydreaming the Color of Blood"	3:00
9.	"Last One in the Noose"	3:29
10.	"She Cheated on You Twice"	3:43
Total length:		33:28

Japanese edition bonus track
No.	Title	Length
11.	"Begin Struggle"

== Personnel ==
Soilent Green

- Louis Benjamin Falgoust II – vocals
- Brian Patton – lead guitar
- Ben Stout – rhythm guitar
- Scott Williams – bass
- Tommy Buckley – drums

Production

- Dave Shirk – mastering
- Dave Fortman – producer, recording, mixing
- Paul Romano – design
- Bill Sienkiewicz – cover art
- Brian Patton – design elements
- Matthew Jacobson – executive producer
