= The Campaign (Into the Moat album) =

Studio album by Into the Moat
- Released: March 17, 2009
- Recorded: June – July 2008 at Mana Studios in St. Petersburg, Florida
- Genre: Mathcore, metalcore, technical death metal
- Length: 42:07
- Label: Metal Blade
- Producer: Erik Rutan

Into the Moat chronology
The Design (2005)	The Campaign (2009)

Professional ratings
Review scores
Source	Rating
AllMusic	3.5/5 stars
MetalSucks	3.5/5 stars

The Campaign is the second studio album by American mathcore/deathcore band Into the Moat. It was released on March 17, 2009, by Metal Blade Records.

== Critical reception ==
Exclaim! wrote that Into the Moat "include a few jazzy interludes in The Campaign that provide a nice contrast to the album's general chaotic sound of technical death metal."

== Track listing ==
1. The Last Century - 5:23
2. From 1,000 Meters... - 3:24
3. Advocate vs. Activist - 7:06
4. The Fuhrer - 5:54
5. Grunt - 4:07
6. Law of Conservation - 5:57
7. The Siege of Orleans - 2:20
8. The Hermit - 7:59

== Personnel ==
- Matt Gossman – drums
- Shawn Ohtani – engineer
- Erik Rutan – producer, engineer, mixing
- Earl Ruwell – vocals
- Adam Santucci – photography
- Ben Slutsky – photography
- Brett Slutsky – layout design
- Nick Ziros – bass guitar
- Kit Wray – guitar
