= Dave Suzuki =

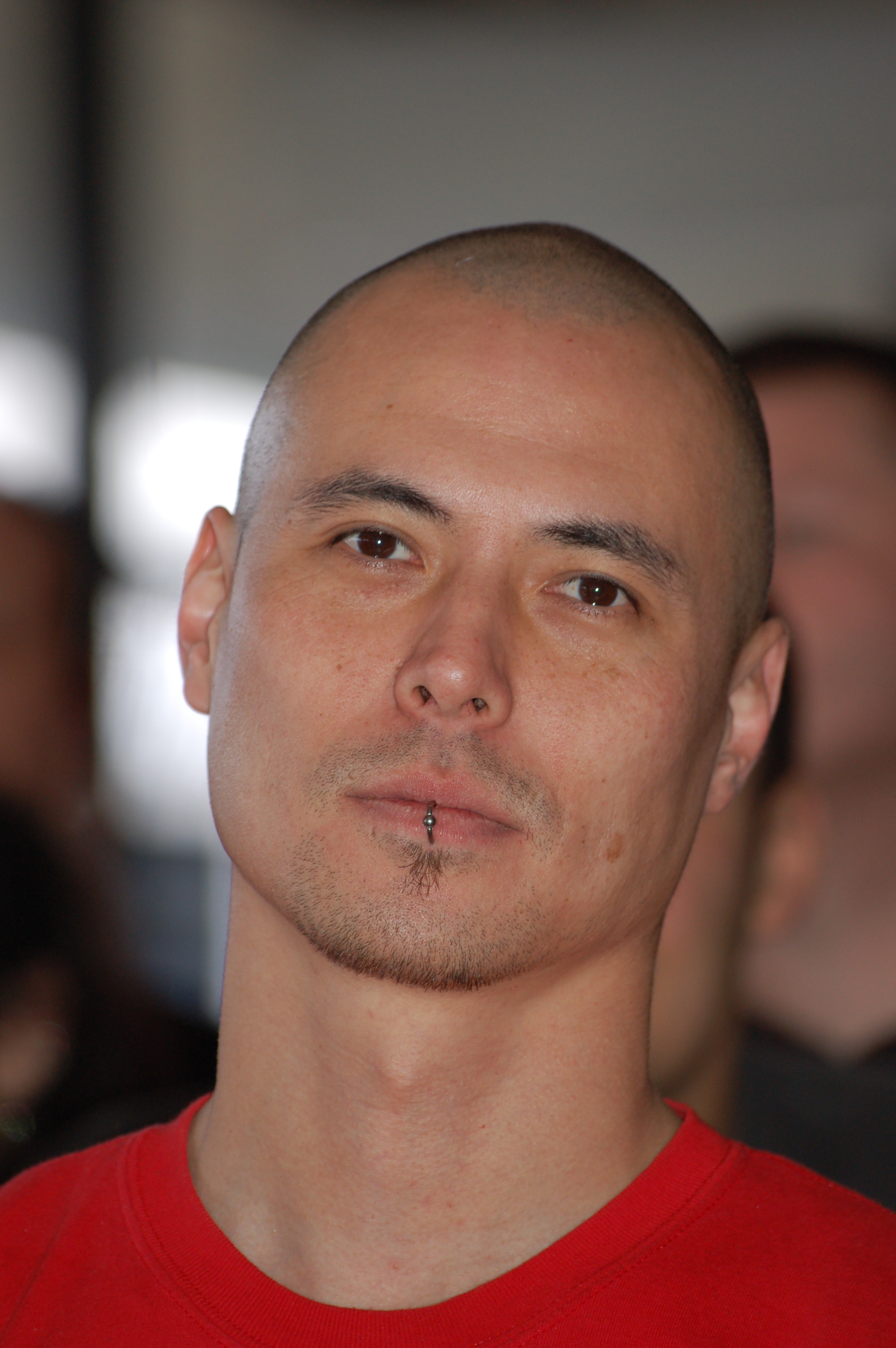
- Suzuki in 2007

Background information
- Born: February 8, 1972 (age 54)
- Genres: Death metal, doom metal
- Occupations: Musician, songwriter
- Instruments: Guitar, bass, drums, percussion, vocals, synthesizer
- Years active: 1991-present
- Label: Century Media

David Suzuki (born February 8, 1972) is an American death metal multi-instrumentalist from Las Vegas, Nevada. He is best known for his work as the guitarist, lyricist, bassist, and drummer for Vital Remains from 1995 to 2007 and as a touring guitarist with Deicide from 2004 to 2005. Since 2011, he has been the guitarist and vocalist for the doom/death metal band Churchburn.

His work can be heard on Vital Remains's Forever Underground (1997), Dawn of the Apocalypse (2000), Dechristianize (2003), and Icons of Evil (2007). Vital Remains's live DVD, Evil Death Live (2007), filmed at 'Metalmania Festival' in Katowice, Poland, includes an interview with Suzuki.

== Discography ==
Vital Remains

- Forever Underground (1997)
- Dawn of the Apocalypse (2000)
- Dechristianize (2003)
- Icons of Evil (2007)
- Evil Death Live (2007) (Live DVD)

Deicide

- When London Burns (2006) (Live DVD)

Churchburn

- The Awaiting Coffins (2014)
- None Shall Live... The Hymns of Misery (2018)
