= The Design (album) =

Studio album by Into the Moat
- Released: March 8, 2005
- Recorded: October 2004 at Mana Studios in Tampa, Florida
- Genres: Mathcore, metalcore, progressive death metal
- Length: 32:54
- Label: Metal Blade
- Producer: Erik Rutan

Into the Moat chronology
Means by Which the End Is Justified (2003)	The Design (2005)	The Campaign (2009)

Professional ratings
Review scores
Source	Rating
AllMusic	3/5 stars
Blabbermouth	7/10 stars
Lambgoat	8/10 stars

The Design is the first studio album by American mathcore/metalcore band Into the Moat. It was released in March 8, 2005 by Metal Blade Records.

== Track listing ==
1. "Century II" - 1:54
2. "Empty Shell" - 3:40
3. "Dead Before I Stray" - 2:41
4. "Guardian" - 3:01
5. "The Inexorable" - 3:12
6. "Fortitudine" - 2:49
7. "Beyond Treachery" - 5:04
8. "None Shall Pass" - 3:09
9. "Prologue..." - 7:24

== Personnel ==
- Matt Gossman – drums
- Earl Ruwell – vocals
- Kit Wray – guitar
- Robert Shaffer – guitar
- Joshua Thiel – bass guitar
- Kevin Lovelost – album layout
- Erik Rutan – producer, engineer, mixing
- Shawn Ohtani – engineer
- Alan Douches – master
