= Dim Mak (band) =

American death metal band

- Origin: New Jersey, U.S.
- Genre: Death metal
- Years active: 1999–present
- Label: Dies Irae records
- Spinoff of: Ripping Corpse
- Members: Joey Capizzi, Shaune Kelley, John Longstreth, Scot Hornick
- Past members: Scott Ruth, Brandon Thomas

Dim Mak is an American death metal band from New Jersey, United States. The band was formed by guitarist Shaune Kelley, vocalist Scott Ruth, and drummer Brandon Thomas, formerly members of Ripping Corpse. Thomas left the band sometime after the release of Intercepting Fist to later join The Dying Light.

The band's lyrical and thematic inspirations include martial arts, Bruce Lee, human rage and violence, Lovecraft's Cthulhu Mythos, battles, etc.

== Albums ==
- Enter the Dragon (1999) - Dies Irae Records
- Intercepting Fist (2002) - Olympic Records/Mighty Music
- Knives of Ice (2006) - Willowtip Records
- The Emergence of Reptilian Altars (2011) - Willowtip Records

== Current lineup ==
- Shaune Kelley (ex-Hate Eternal, ex-Ripping Corpse) - guitars
- Joey Capizzi (ex-Cattlepress, ex-The Dying Light) - vocals
- John Longstreth (Origin) - drums
- Scot Hornick - bass
