= Infernus (album) =

Studio album by Hate Eternal
- Released: August 21, 2015
- Recorded: September 2014 – January 2015
- Studio: Mana Recording Studios St. Petersburg, Florida
- Genre: Death metal
- Length: 45:45
- Label: Season of Mist
- Producer: Erik Rutan

Hate Eternal chronology
Phoenix Amongst the Ashes (2011)	Infernus (2015)	Upon Desolate Sands (2018)

Infernus is the sixth album by the American death metal band Hate Eternal, released on August 21, 2015. It is the second album to feature bassist J.J. Hrubovcak, and the only album to feature drummer Chason Westmoreland from Burning the Masses before his departure due to "family matters" and also their first album to be released by Season of Mist.

== Track listing ==
No.	Title	Lyrics	Music	Length
1.	"Locust Swarm"	Rutan	Rutan, Hrubovcak	3:44
2.	"The Stygian Deep"	Rutan	Rutan	4:32
3.	"Pathogenic Apathy"	Hrubovcak	Hrubovcak, Rutan	4:54
4.	"La Tempestad"	Rutan	Rutan, Hrubovcak	3:56
5.	"Infernus"	Rutan	Rutan	6:27
6.	"The Chosen One"	Rutan	Rutan, Hrubovcak	3:23
7.	"Zealot, Crusader of War"	Rutan	Hrubovcak, Rutan	4:39
8.	"Order of the Arcane Scripture"	Hrubovcak	Rutan, Hrubovcak	4:23
9.	"Chaos Theory"	instrumental	Rutan, Hrubovcak	3:45
10.	"O' Majestic Being, Hear My Call"	Rutan	Rutan	5:55
Total length:				45:45

== Personnel ==
Hate Eternal

- Erik Rutan – guitars, vocals
- JJ Hrubovcak – bass
- Chason Westmoreland – drums

Production

- Edward Linsmier – photography
- Erik Rutan – recording, mixing, producer, engineering
- Eliran Kantor – artwork
- J.J. Hrubovcak – additional engineering
- Jarrett Pritchard – drum technician
- Alan Douches – mastering
