= Let Us Pray =

Studio album by Vital Remains
- Released: August 21, 1992
- Recorded: December, 1991 at Fat Trax Studios, Pawtucket, Rhode Island
- Genre: Death metal
- Length: 56:13
- Label: Peaceville Records
- Producer: Vital Remains, Tony Ricci

Vital Remains chronology
Let Us Pray (1992)	Into Cold Darkness (1995)

Let Us Pray is the debut album by the American death metal band Vital Remains. It was released by Deaf Records/Peaceville Records in 1992. It is the only album to feature Ace Alonzo on drums.

== Track listing ==
- All songs written and arranged by Vital Remains.

No.	Title	Length
1.	"War in Paradise"	7:44
2.	"Of Pure Unholiness"	6:39
3.	"Ceremony of the Seventh Circle"	6:58
4.	"Uncultivated Grave"	7:01
5.	"Malevolent Invocation"	4:10
6.	"Isolated Magick"	5:13
7.	"Cult of the Dead"	7:09
8.	"Frozen Terror"	5:47
9.	"Amulet of the Conquering" (bonus track)	5:32
Total length:		56:13

== Personnel ==
- Jeff Gruslin - vocals
- Tony Lazaro - rhythm guitar
- Paul Flynn - lead guitar
- Joseph "Joe" Lewis - bass
- Ace Alonzo - drums
