= Alas (American band) =

US musical group

- Origin: Tampa, Florida
- Genres: Symphonic metal Progressive metal
- Years active: 1996 -
- Label: Karmageddon Media
- Members: Martina Hornbacher; Scot Hornick; Erik Rutan; Howard Davis
- Past members: Alex Webster; Clayton Gore; Jason Morgan

Alas are an operatic progressive metal band from Tampa, Florida, U.S.

== History ==
Alas was formed and led by Death metal pioneer Morbid Angel ex-guitarist Erik Rutan. They also featured well known Cannibal Corpse bassist Alex Webster. They released an album called Absolute Purity in 2001.

=== Band members ===
==== Current members ====
- Martina Astner - vocals
- Howard Davis - drums, percussion
- Scot Hornick - bass guitar
- Erik Rutan - guitars

==== Past members ====
- Tracey Beant - vocals
- Clayton Gore - drums, percussion
- Jason Morgan - guitars
- Alex Webster - bass guitar

== Discography ==
=== Demos ===
- Engulfed in Grief (1996)
- Engulfed in Grief / Promo '97 (1997)

=== Albums ===
- Absolute Purity (2001)
