= Dawn of the Apocalypse =

Studio album by Vital Remains
- Released: March 25, 2000
- Genre: Death metal
- Length: 58:39
- Label: Osmose Productions

Vital Remains chronology
Forever Underground (1997)	Dawn of the Apocalypse (2000)	Dechristianize (2003)

Professional ratings
Review scores
Source	Rating
Chronicles of Chaos	10/10
Rock Hard	8/10

Dawn of the Apocalypse is the fourth full-length album by the American death metal band Vital Remains. It was produced by Joe Moody and Vital Remains. It is the only album to feature vocalist Thorn and the last to feature bassist Joe Lewis.

== Track listing ==
No.	Title	Length
1.	"Intro"	0:49
2.	"Black Magick Curse"	8:46
3.	"Dawn of the Apocalypse"	8:47
4.	"Sanctity in Blasphemous Ruin"	8:39
5.	"Came No Ray of Light"	0:53
6.	"Flag of Victory"	9:10
7.	"Behold the Throne of Chaos"	8:47
8.	"The Night Has a Thousand Eyes"	3:43
9.	"Societe des Luciferiens"	9:05
Total length:		58:39

== Personnel ==
- Thorn – vocals, keyboards, programming, samples
- Tony Lazaro – rhythm guitar
- Joe Lewis – bass guitar
- Dave Suzuki – drums, lead guitar, keyboards
