= Into Cold Darkness =

Studio album by Vital Remains
- Released: March 25, 1995
- Recorded: 1994 at Fat Trax Studios, Pawtucket, Rhode Island
- Genre: Death metal
- Length: 36:25
- Label: Peaceville Records

Vital Remains chronology
Let Us Pray (1992)	Into Cold Darkness (1995)	Forever Underground (1997)

Into Cold Darkness is the second album by Vital Remains. It was released in 1995 by Peaceville Records, and re-issued in 2003 with two bonus tracks as a digipak. The last to feature lead guitarist Paul Flynn and vocalist Jeff Gruslin and the only album to feature drummer Rick Corbett.

== Track listing ==
No.	Title	Length
1.	"Immortal Crusade"	8:56
2.	"Under the Moon's Fog"	6:45
3.	"Crown of the Black Hearts"	3:40
4.	"Scrolls of a Millennium Past"	5:18
5.	"Into Cold Darkness"	3:51
6.	"Descent into Hell"	4:02
7.	"Angels of Blasphemy"	3:53
Total length:		36:25

Digipak Version
No.	Title	Length
8.	"Dethroned Emperor" (Celtic Frost cover, bonus track)	4:44
9.	"Countess Bathory" (Venom cover, bonus track)	3:42
Total length:		44:51

== Personnel ==
- Paul Flynn – lead guitar
- Tony Lazaro – rhythm guitar
- Jeff Gruslin – vocals
- Joe Lewis – bass
- Rick Corbett – drums
