= I, Monarch =

Studio album by Hate Eternal
- Released: June 28, 2005
- Genre: Death metal
- Length: 42:32
- Label: Earache Records
- Producer: Erik Rutan

Hate Eternal chronology
King of All Kings (2002)	I, Monarch (2005)	Fury and Flames (2008)

I, Monarch is the third studio album by Florida death metal band Hate Eternal. It was released June 28, 2005, on Earache Records.

Professional ratings
Review scores
Source	Rating
Allmusic	4/5 stars
Kerrang!	5/5 stars
Zero Tolerance	4/5
Metal Hammer	8/10
Stylus	B
Exclaim!	Favorable
Rock Sound	9/10
New York Press	Favorable

== Track listing ==
All tracks are written by Erik Rutan except where noted.

No.	Title	Lyrics	Length
1.	"Two Demons"		3:55
2.	"Behold Judas"	Rutan; Randy Piro	4:21
3.	"The Victorious Reign"		3:38
4.	"To Know Our Enemies"		4:15
5.	"I, Monarch"		4:37
6.	"Path to the Eternal Gods"	Rutan; Derek Roddy	3:28
7.	"The Plague of Humanity"		4:02
8.	"It Is Our Will"	Rutan; Roddy	4:41
9.	"Sons of Darkness"	Rutan; Piro	4:56
10.	"Faceless One"	Instrumental	4:39

== Personnel ==
Hate Eternal

- Erik Rutan - guitars, vocals
- Derek Roddy - drums
- Randy Piro - bass

Artwork

- Paul Romano - art direction, artwork & design
