= Derek Roddy =

American drummer (born 1972)

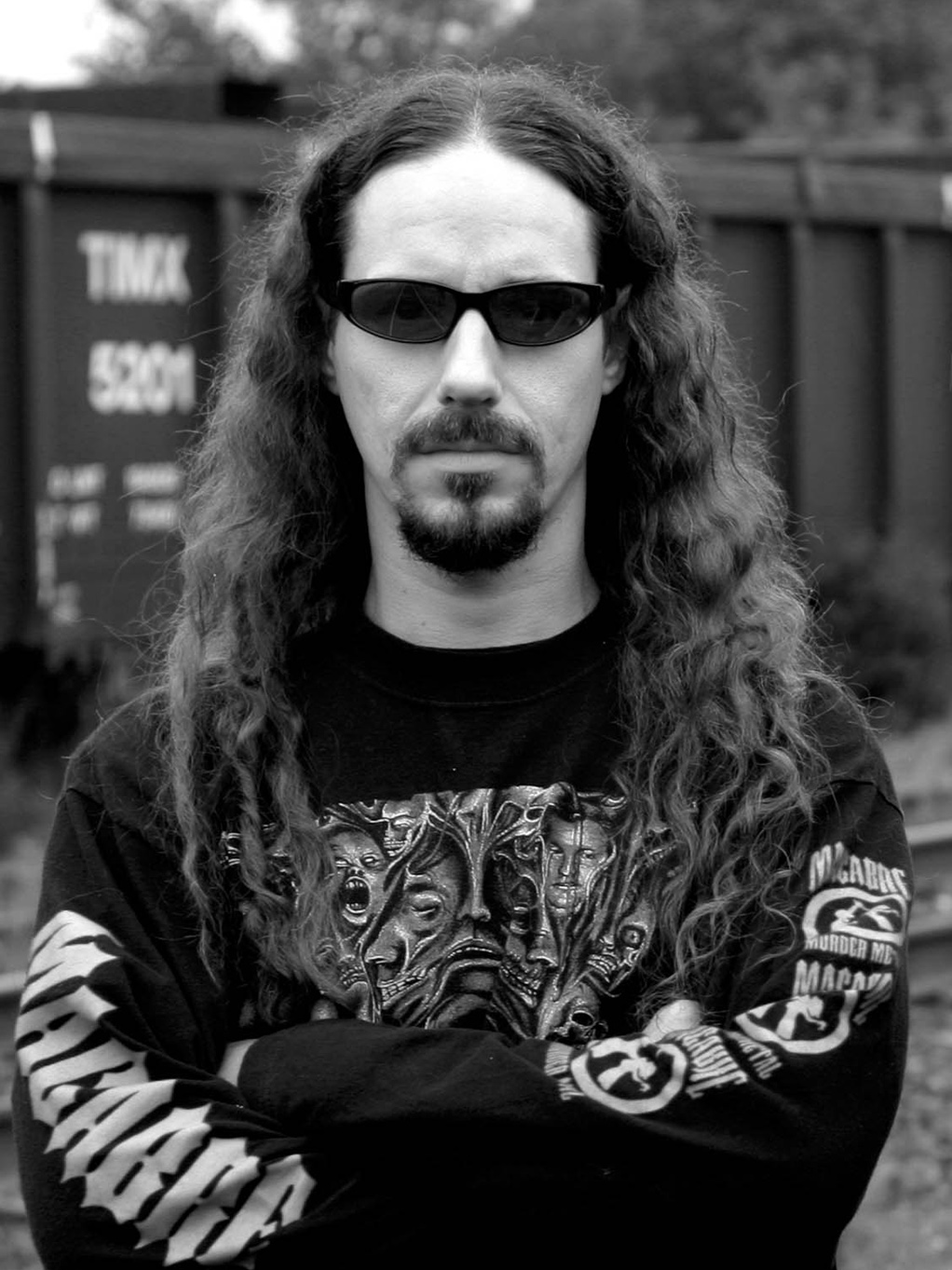
- Roddy in 2003

Background information
- Also known as: "One Take"
- Born: August 28, 1972 (age 53); Myrtle Beach, South Carolina, U.S.
- Genres: Death metal, technical death metal, noise rock, post-hardcore, black metal, progressive metal, instrumental rock, melodic death metal
- Occupation: Musician
- Instruments: Drums, guitar
- Years active: 1997–present

Derek Roddy (born August 28, 1972) is an American drummer originally from Myrtle Beach, South Carolina. His ability to record entire drum tracks in one or two takes earned him the nickname "One Take".

Derek has gained a reputation worldwide as an extreme metal drummer. Though he may be known as the second drummer of Hate Eternal, he has also played and recorded with Nile, Malevolent Creation, Divine Empire, Council of the Fallen (where he played guitar), Today Is the Day, Traumedy and Aurora Borealis.

On March 28, 2006, Roddy announced his departure from Hate Eternal. In February 2006, Roddy was briefly named as the drummer for Blotted Science, but was unable to record due to conflicting schedules. Lamb of God drummer Chris Adler had also been considered for the project.

Around 2007, Roddy started an instrumental band called Serpents Rise, which almost immediately grabbed the attention of drummers around the world. Serpents Rise is often referred to by fans as having an obscure sound for their bizarre guitar parts and incorporation of various percussion instruments. In 2010 Roddy was one out of seven drummers who auditioned to replace Mike Portnoy as the drummer for Dream Theater.

== Discography ==
=== With Aurora Borealis ===
- Praise the Archaic Light's Embrace (1998)
- Northern Lights (2000)
- Northern Lights: DieHard Release (2001)

=== With Council of the Fallen ===
- Demo (1999)
- Revealing Damnation (2002)

=== With Creature ===
- Demo (1997)

=== With Deboning Method ===
- Demo (1992)
- Cold Demo (1993)

=== With Divine Empire ===
- Redemption (1998)

=== With Gothic Outcasts ===
- Sights Unseen (1997)

=== With Hate Eternal ===
- King of All Kings (September 16, 2002)
- I, Monarch (June 27, 2005)

=== With Malevolent Creation ===
- In Cold Blood (1997)

=== With Nile ===
- Black Seeds of Vengeance (September 5, 2000)

=== With Today Is the Day ===
- Axis of Eden (2007)

=== Various artists ===
- Drum Nation Vol. 3 (2006)
- Visionaries of the Macabre: Vol.1 (1998)
- Worldwide Metal Inquisition (1998)

=== With Serpents Rise ===
- Serpents Rise (2010)
- Serpents Rise 2 (2012)
- Serpents Rise III (2014)

== Gear ==
Derek is a full endorser of DW drums and hardware, Meinl cymbals, Remo drumheads, Vater drumsticks, and Axis pedals. Derek was a former endorser of Sonor drums prior to his switch to DW. Before signing on with Meinl, Derek also used Paiste and then Sabian cymbals. He also used Aquarian drumheads in the past.

- Drums: DW Collector's Series Maple: Natural to Regal Burst over Ivory Ebony Exotic
  - 20" x 15" Kick Drum (x2)
  - 10" x 8" Tom
  - 12" x 8" Tom
  - 8" x 8" Tom
  - 14" x 14" Floor Tom
  - 16" x 16" Floor Tom
  - 10" x 5" Snare
  - 13" x 5" Snare
  - 14" x 6.5" Collector's Bronze Snare (knurled finish)
- Cymbals: Meinl
  - 8" Soundcaster Custom Splash
  - 10" Soundcaster Custom Splash
  - 20" Mb20 Rock China
  - 13" Byzance Brilliant Serpents Hi-hats
  - 16" Soundcaster Custom Medium Crash
  - 17" Soundcaster Custom Medium Crash
  - 12" Generation X Filter China
  - 10" Generation X Filter China
  - 18" Mb20 Rock China
  - 21" Byzance Brilliant Serpents Ride
  - 18" Soundcaster Custom Medium Crash
  - 8" Generation X FX Hi-hats
- Drumheads: Remo
- Drumsticks: Vater
  - Derek Roddy Signature: Derek's model is in between a 5A and 5B in the grip. The stick features a really quick taper to a small acorn tip for warm, but defined cymbal tones. A great stick for a variety of musical applications.
- Pedals: Axis
  - A21 Derek Roddy Signature pedals
  - E-kit Triggers
  - Axis Wrecking Ball Beaters
