= Path of Totality =

- Album cover artwork by Thomas Hooper

Studio album by Tombs
- Released: June 7, 2011
- Recorded: Elmwood Recording, Dallas, TX; January 2011
- Genres: Avant-garde metal, post-metal, black metal
- Length: 57:31
- Labels: Relapse Records CD, LP (RR7158)
- Producer: Tombs

Tombs chronology
| Fear Is The Weapon (2010) | Path of Totality (2011) | Savage Gold (2014) |

Professional ratings
Review scores
| Source | Rating |
|---|---|
| AllMusic | 4/5 stars |
| Blistering | 8/10 stars |
| Blogcritics | (favorable) |
| Metal Injection | 9.1/10 |
| The Quietus | (favorable) |

Path of Totality is the second full-length studio album from American metal band Tombs. It was released on June 7, 2011 through Relapse Records in CD, LP and digital download formats. It is the group's first album to be recorded by John Congleton.

According to Mike Hill, the album title is a reference to the channel of darkness, or shadow, that is cast upon the earth in the moment when the moon obscures the sun during a solar eclipse. Concerning the lyrics, Mike Hill commented: "The lyrics are less personal, in that they have nothing to do with my personal experiences or any kind of internal narrative. The new record deals more with reflections on death, endings and the sort of existential cynicism that can easily creep into your consciousness living in a world where there seems be an incredible level of detachment."

Decibel Magazine ranked Path of Totality number one in their Top 40 Extreme Albums of 2011 list.

== Track listing ==
| No. | Title | Length |
|---|---|---|
| 1. | "Black Hole of Summer" | 5:22 |
| 2. | "To Cross the Land" | 5:53 |
| 3. | "Constellations" | 2:39 |
| 4. | "Bloodletters" | 4:31 |
| 5. | "Path of Totality" | 4:51 |
| 6. | "Vermillion" | 4:58 |
| 7. | "Passageways" | 3:31 |
| 8. | "Silent World" | 4:24 |
| 9. | "Cold Dark Eyes" | 6:46 |
| 10. | "Black Heaven" | 5:09 |
| 11. | "Red Shadows" | 4:48 |
| 12. | "Angel of Destruction" | 3:44 |
| Total length: | | 57:31 |

== Personnel ==
Path of Totality album personnel adapted from the CD liner notes

Tombs

- Mike Hill – vocals, guitar
- Carson Daniel James – bass
- Andrew Hernandez II – drums, percussion

Additional musicians

- Bryant Clifford Meyer – synthesizer, keyboard on "Black Hole of Summer", "Angel of Destruction" & "Black Heaven"
- The Champ Morgan – back up vocals on "Vermillion", "Path of Totality" & "Angel of Destruction"

Production

- Alan Douches – mastering
- John Congleton – mixing, recording

Art

- Thomas Hooper and Mike Hill – concept and layout
- Thomas Hooper – art and illustration
- Jacob Speis – design
