= Tombs (band) =

American heavy metal band

- Origin: Brooklyn, New York, U.S.
- Genres: Experimental metal, black metal, post-metal
- Years active: 2007–present
- Labels: Season of Mist, Relapse, Level Plane, Blackbox, Metal Blade, Redefining Darkness Records
- Members: Mike Hill; Justin Spaeth; Drew Murphy; Dan Higgins
- Past members: Dan Howard; Carson Daniel James; Justin Ennis; Dominic Seita; Andrew Hernandez; Fade Kainer; Ben Brand; Evan Void; Matt Medeiros; Todd Stern
- Website: tombscult.com

Tombs is an American heavy metal band from Brooklyn, New York, formed in 2007. Thus far, the group has released six full-length records: Winter Hours, Path of Totality, Savage Gold, The Grand Annihilation, Under Sullen Skies and Feral Darkness.

== History ==
The group was founded by guitarist/vocalist Mike Hill, bassist Domic Seita and drummer Justin Ennis in 2007. In 2009, the group released their first full-length album, Winter Hours, through Relapse Records. In 2011, Tombs released their second full-length album, Path of Totality. Path of Totality was met with critical acclaim. A song titled "Ashes" was featured in the Decibel Magazine October 2012 issue as a part of its Flexi Series. On August 29, 2012, a cover of David Bowie's song "Heroes" was made available for streaming on Ghettoblaster. Tracking for their third record, Savage Gold, began on November 11, 2013, with producer Erik Rutan at Mana Recording Studios in Florida. Hammer Fight guitarist Todd Sterns and bassist and lead singer Drew Murphy joined the group in 2019.

== Musical style and influences ==
The band's sound has been described as multiple metal styles which include black metal, post-metal, and experimental metal. Frontman Mike Hill has likened the group's sound to being more black metal-inspired. Hill has named bands such as Neurosis, Swans, Joy Division, Darkthrone, Black Flag, Deathspell Omega, Leviathan, and Bauhaus, among others, as being influential to the group's sound.

== Band members ==
=== Current ===
- Mike Hill – lead vocals, rhythm guitar, synths (2007–present)
- Justin Spaeth – drums, synths, additional guitars (2018–present)
- Drew Murphy – bass, backing vocals (2018–present)
- Dan Higgins – lead guitar (2025–present)

=== Former ===
- Andrew Hernandez – drums (2009–2014)
- Dan Howard – guitars (2012)
- Carson Daniel James – bass (2009–2012)
- Justin Ennis – drums (2007–2009)
- Domenic Seita – bass (2007–2008)
- Garett Bussanick – lead guitar (2013)
- Ben Brand – bass, backing vocals (2013–2017)
- Evan Void – lead guitar, backing vocals (2014–2018)
- Fade Kainer – keyboards, backing vocals (2014–2018)
- Charlie Schmid – drums (2014–2018)
- Matt Medeiros – lead guitar (2018–2022)
- Todd Stern – lead guitar (2022–2025)

== Discography ==
=== Studio albums ===
- 2009: Winter Hours (Relapse Records)
- 2011: Path of Totality (Relapse Records)
- 2014: Savage Gold (Relapse Records)
- 2017: The Grand Annihilation (Metal Blade Records)
- 2020: Under Sullen Skies (Season of Mist)
- 2025: Feral Darkness (Redefining Darkness Records)

=== Compilations ===
- 2010: Fear Is the Weapon

=== Extended plays ===
- 2007: Tombs
- 2008: Tombs/Planks (split EP with Planks)
- 2016: All Empires Fall
- 2020: Monarchy of Shadows
- 2022: Ex Oblivion
