= Horrors of Hell =

Compilation album by Vital Remains
- Released: 2006
- Genre: Brutal death metal
- Label: Century Media

Vital Remains chronology
Dechristianize (2003)	Horrors of Hell (2006)	Icons of Evil (2007)

Professional ratings
Review scores
Source	Rating
Allmusic	link

Horrors of Hell is a compilation album by the American death metal band Vital Remains, consisting of early demo recordings. It was released in 2006 by Century Media. All tracks are remastered, and the album is limited to 5000 copies.

== Track listing ==
1. "Of Pure Unholyness" – 6:16
2. "Frozen Terror" – 5:32
3. "Human Sacrifice" – 4:56
4. "Resurrected" – 6:33
5. "Fallen Angels" – 4:05
6. "Excruciating Pain" – 3:41
7. "Nocturnal Blasphemy" – 5:09
8. "Vital Remains" – 5:08
9. "Smoldering Burial" – 2:59
10. "Morbid Death" – 2:38
11. "Reduced To Ashes" – 2:50
12. "More Brains" – 2:58
13. "Slaughter Shack" – 4:37

Tracks 1–2 from the "Black Mass" 7" (1991)
Tracks 3–7 from the Excruciating Pain demo (1990)
Tracks 8–13 from the Reduced to Ashes demo (1989)

== Personnel ==
- Tony Lazaro - guitar
- Jeff Gruslin - vocals (8–13)
- Paul Flynn - lead guitar
- Tom Supkow - bass (8–13)
- Chris Dupont - drums (8–13)
- Joe Lewis - bass, vocals (1–7)
