= Dechristianize (album) =

Studio album by Vital Remains
- Released: August 22, 2003
- Recorded: April 29 – May 11, 2002
- Studio: Morrisound Recording
- Genre: Brutal death metal
- Length: 60:40
- Label: Century Media
- Producer: Vital Remains

Vital Remains chronology
Dawn of the Apocalypse (2000)	Dechristianize (2003)	Horrors of Hell (2006)

Professional ratings
Review scores
Source	Rating
AllMusic	2.5/5 stars

Dechristianize is the fifth album by American death metal band Vital Remains. It was released on August 22, 2003. The lyrics deal with the Dechristianization of France during the French Revolution. The intro - "Let the Killing Begin" - features a section of Carl Orff's "O Fortuna" and voices from the film The Greatest Story Ever Told. This album was the first to feature Deicide vocalist Glen Benton, and is generally considered to be the band's breakthrough album.

== Track listing ==
All songs by Tony Lazaro and Dave Suzuki.

No.	Title	Length
1.	"Let the Killing Begin"	1:59
2.	"Dechristianize"	8:56
3.	"Infidel"	6:17
4.	"Devoured Elysium"	5:44
5.	"Savior to None... Failure for All..."	6:37
6.	"Unleashed Hell"	5:58
7.	"Rush of Deliverance"	7:07
8.	"At War with God"	7:55
9.	"Entwined by Vengeance"	10:00
Total length:		60:40

== Personnel ==
Vital Remains

- Glen Benton - vocals
- Tony Lazaro - rhythm guitar
- Dave Suzuki - lead guitar, bass guitar, drums

Production

- Mark Prator - Mixing, Engineer
- Aaron Caillier - Engineer
- Robert Pemberton - Remixing, Engineer
- Todd Jessop - Engineer
- Roger Lian - Mastering
- Jaromír "Deather" Bezruč - Cover Art
- Joe Rooney - Photos
