= Soilent Green =

American extreme metal band

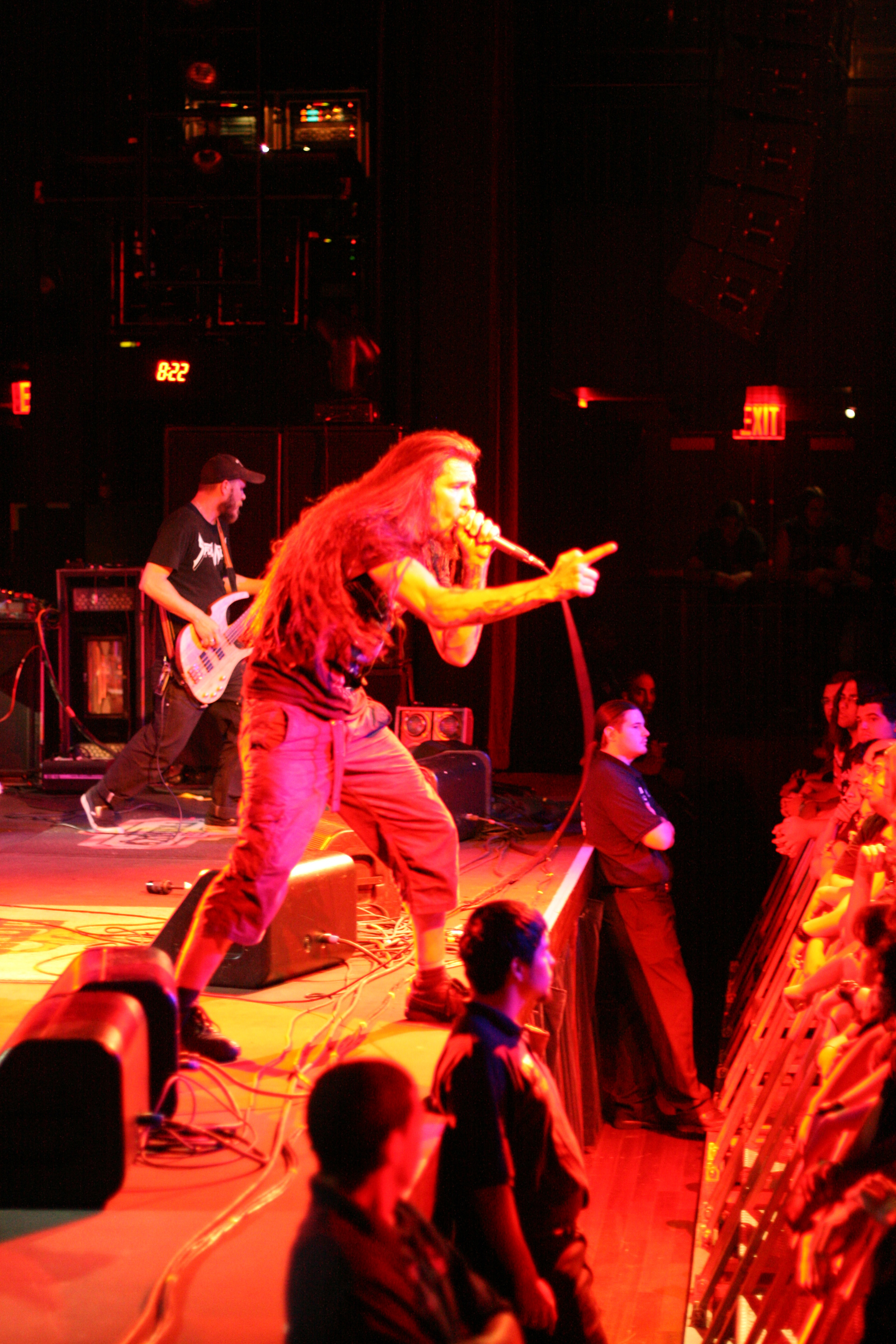
- Soilent Green performing in 2008

Background information
- Origin: New Orleans, Louisiana, U.S.
- Genres: Sludge metal; death metal; grindcore
- Years active: 1988–present
- Labels: Dwell; Relapse; Metal Blade; Housecore
- Members: Donovan Punch; Tommy Buckley; Brian Patton; Ben Falgoust; Scott Crochet
- Past members: Donovan Punch; Glenn Rambo; Marcel Trenchard; Scott Williams; Ben Stout; Tony White; Gregg Harney

Soilent Green is an American grindcore/sludge metal band formed in 1988 in Chalmette/Metairie on the suburbs of New Orleans, Louisiana.

== History ==
Soilent Green was founded in 1988. Although active from the late 1980s, the band underwent several lineup changes in its early years, and its output was slowed in part by guitarist Brian Patton’s involvement with Eyehategod. Bassist Scott Williams joined the band in 1992, followed by vocalist Ben Falgoust in 1993. This lineup released the band’s debut album, Pussysoul, through Dwell Records in 1995.

The following four albums were released by Relapse Records, until they signed with Metal Blade Records for their 2008 album, Inevitable Collapse in the Presence of Conviction.

On April 26, 2004, bassist Scott Williams was killed in a murder–suicide by his partner. In September 2005, former singer Glenn Rambo was killed in Hurricane Katrina.

== Musical style ==
Soilent Green's musical style is characterized as a mixture of grindcore with sludge and blues-heavy southern rock. Rock Hard initially saw the band as an intersection of Eyehategod, Crowbar and Anal Cunt with occasional borrowings from death metal, but on the next album the group's sound focused on grindcore, which the band combined with influences from sludge and technical death metal, and coined the term "sludgegrind" for Soilent Green's 2008 album. Michael Edele of laut.de described the band's style as a "contradictory mixture of hardcore, sludge, grindcore and southern rock".

The band's 1990s and early-2000s albums are regarded as trendsetting for the grindcore genre; a Rolling Stone article listed Soilent Green as one of the "ten most important hard and heavy bands" of the hour in the late 1990s.

== In popular culture ==
In 2009, Soilent Green was featured on the first episode of season four on the Adult Swim show Squidbillies, entitled "Lerm". They performed the main title theme in a cowpunk/sludge style.

== Members ==
=== Current ===
- Tommy Buckley – drums (1988–present)
- Brian Patton – guitar (1988–present)
- Ben Falgoust – vocals (1993–present)
- Scott Crochet – bass (2003–present)
- Donovan Punch – guitar (1988-1999 2026-present)

=== Former ===
- Glenn Rambo – vocals (1988–1992; died 2005)
- Marcel Trenchard – bass (1988–1992)
- Scott Williams – bass (1992–2002; died 2004)
- Ben Stout – guitar (2000–2001)
- Tony White – guitar (2003–2005)
- Gregg Harney – guitar (2005–2007)

== Discography ==
=== Studio albums ===
Release date	Title	Label
1995	Pussysoul	Dwell Records
1998	Sewn Mouth Secrets	Relapse Records
2001	A Deleted Symphony for the Beaten Down	Relapse Records
2005	Confrontation	Relapse Records
2008	Inevitable Collapse in the Presence of Conviction	Metal Blade Records

=== EPs ===
Release date	Title	Label
1998	String of Lies	Relapse Records
