= Vital Remains =

American death metal band

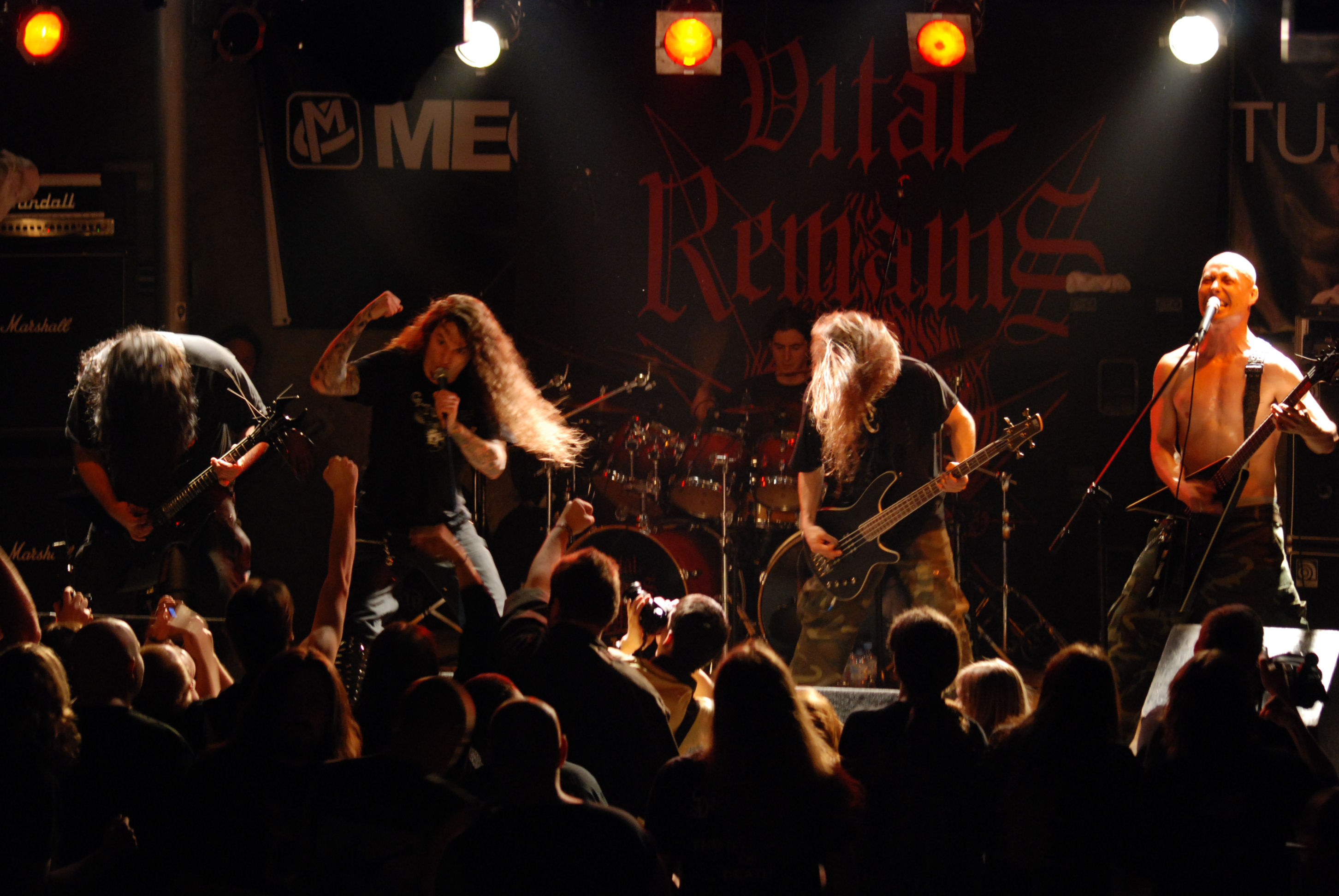
- Vital Remains during concert in MegaClub, Katowice, Poland 2007. From left to right: Tony Lazaro, Damien Boynton, Antonio Donadeo, Brian Hobbie, Dave Suzuki

Background information
- Origin: Providence, Rhode Island, U.S.
- Genre: Death metal
- Years active: 1988–present
- Label: Century Media
- Members: Tony Lazaro; Gaeton Collier; Chris Dovas; Caio Kehyayan; Scott Eames
- Past members: Paul Flynn; Tom Supkow; Chris Dupont; Jeff Gruslin; Ace Alonzo; Joseph "Joe" Lewis; Rick Corbett; Dave Suzuki; Glen Benton; "Thorn"

Vital Remains is an American death metal band from Providence, Rhode Island, formed in 1988. (Note: According to an interview with former bassist/vocalist Joe Lewis, Vital Remains started in 1988 as a blackened death metal band and stated that the band formed "when Tony and Jeff got into a fight with some other musicians at a local metal gig and it turned out that the guys they were going to fight were Paul Flynn and his friends.. and instead of beating each other to a pulp they decided to create a band together as Vital Remains.. and the rest is history!") They have released six studio albums.

== History ==
=== Formation and early years ===
Guitarist Paul Flynn formed Vital Remains in 1988. Vital Remains' first line-up included Paul Flynn on lead guitar, Butch Machado on rhythm guitar, vocalist Mike Flynn, bassist Tom Supkow and drummer Chris Dupont. Mike Flynn is credited with coining the band's name. Paul soon revamped the band with musicians that fit his vision, and added Tony Lazaro and vocalist Jeff Gruslin to the line-up. Lazaro and Flynn shared the song writing duties, and released a pair of demos (1989's Reduced to Ashes and 1990's Excruciating Pain). The band secured a contract with French label Thrash Records, and released the single "The Black Mass" in 1991. Shortly after the release, the band signed to Peaceville's subsidiary label, Deaf Records. Vital Remains released Let Us Pray in 1992, as well as Into Cold Darkness in 1995. However, the band requested contract dissolution with Deaf Records, citing poor distribution, and a lack of promotion.

=== Suzuki joining, Forever Underground, departure of old members and Dawn of the Apocalypse ===
In 1996, Dave Suzuki joined the band, initially playing drums. Suzuki eventually contributed guitar work, as the band worked on their next album. In mid 1997, Vital Remains signed a two-album deal with Osmose Records. Paul Flynn left the band in 1996 (citing family obligations), alongside vocalist Jeff Gruslin. The band released Forever Underground in 1997. Bassist Joe Lewis did vocals for the album, at the same time, Lazaro and Suzuki recorded the bass parts. Chris Ross from Cape Cod joined the band as the vocalist and Metal Maniacs said "that no band on the planet put on a headbanging show of satanic fury than Vital Remains." The band released Dawn of the Apocalypse in 2000, which featured vocalist Thorn. The album debuted a new, heavier style. Joe Lewis left the band same year and Thorn was fired in 2001. Jake Raymond became the band's new vocalist in 2001, but left later same year.

=== Glen Benton era and Dave Suzuki's departure ===
In 2003, Glen Benton, vocalist/bassist of Deicide joined Vital Remains as a session vocalist for Vital Remains' fifth album, Dechristianize. According to one interview, Lazaro was working as a guitar tech on tour for Deicide and had tried to get Benton to do a feature on a song years before. It didn't work out, but they later managed to get Glen to do all the vocals on Dechristianize. The album received critical acclaim, and the band toured in-between Deicide's touring schedule. The band followed up with Icons of Evil in 2007, which also featured Glen Benton as a session vocalist and continued the same musical style as Dechristianize. Vital Remains also released their first live DVD, Evil-Death-Live, through Polish label Metal Mind Productions. Dave Suzuki left the band, shortly after the release of Icons of Evil.

=== Recent activity, vocalists' deaths and Tony Lazaro's health problems ===
Vital Remains toured extensively for several years following the release of Icons of Evil, experiencing many lineup changes throughout the years. The only permanent member besides Tony Lazaro is bassist Gator Collier since 2008. In several interviews between 2012 and 2014, Tony claimed that the band had "two albums worth of material."

In late 2014 and early 2015, the band added drummer James Payne (ex Hour of Penance), and Toronto-based Dean Arnold (of Primal Frost) as lead guitarist. Vital Remains toured South America, Europe and the United States in 2015. In November 2015, a Sanford Florida police officer was fired for singing "Let the Killing Begin" with the band, while he was on duty and in uniform. A video posted on YouTube shows Officer Andrew Ricks - in full uniform - making 'devil's horns' gesture and roaring the title words to the song.

Three of the band's former vocalists died between 2017 and 2018. On July 4, 2017, Chris Ross was fatally shot by his brother-in-law, James Ball. On November 2, 2017, Scott Wiley was reported dead with no cause of death revealed, followed by Jake Raymond on June 25, 2018.

On September 2, 2019, Brian Werner announced his decision to leave Vital Remains via his social media channels. The announcement was confirmed by the band on their Facebook and also opened an audition call for a live vocalist to join the band in their upcoming U.S. winter tour, and also stated their intention to finish and release their long-awaited seventh studio album in 2020; as of June 2025, however, the album has not been released.

On October 31, 2019, the band announced on their Facebook that Scott Eames would be the band's new lead vocalist for their 30th anniversary tour.

In April 2020, Tony Lazaro had an emergency surgery for brain tumor. Afterwards he spent another 3 months in the hospital with another multiple surgeries. The tumor caused partial loss of vision and inability to perform on stage. Unable to work, Tony was forced to sell some of his musical equipment and in December 2022, his wife Natasha Rody organized a fundraiser to cover the medical costs of his treatment on GoFundMe.

== Style ==
Vital Remains earlier work had minor use of keyboards and ambient noise. After Forever Underground, they removed those elements for a purely death metal approach. Elements of their music that distinguish them in their genre are the use of acoustic Spanish-style solos and their construction of very long songs, which is uncommon in the majority of death metal music. Many of the songs on more recent releases approach eight or nine minutes in length. With the addition of Dave Suzuki to the band, the lead guitar work took a much more prominent place within song structure. He also chose to employ a neoclassical style of soloing.

== Band members ==
=== Current members ===
- Tony Lazaro – rhythm guitar (1988–present)
- Gaeton "Gator" Collier – bass, backing vocals (2008–present)
- Scott Eames – lead vocals (2019–present)
- Chris Dovas - drums (2018–present)
- Caio Kehyayan - lead guitar (2019–present)

=== Former members ===
- Paul Flynn – lead guitar (1988–1996)
- Tom Supkow – bass (1988–1989)
- Chris Dupont – drums (1988–1990)
- Jeff Gruslin – lead vocals (1988–1995)
- Ace Alonzo – drums (1990–1994)
- Joseph "Joe" Lewis – bass (1990–2000), lead vocals (1996–1999)
- Rick Corbett – drums (1994–1995)
- Dave Suzuki – lead guitar, drums, backing vocals (1997–2007), bass (2000–2007)
- "Thorn" – lead vocals (1999)
- Glen Benton – lead vocals (2003–2008)

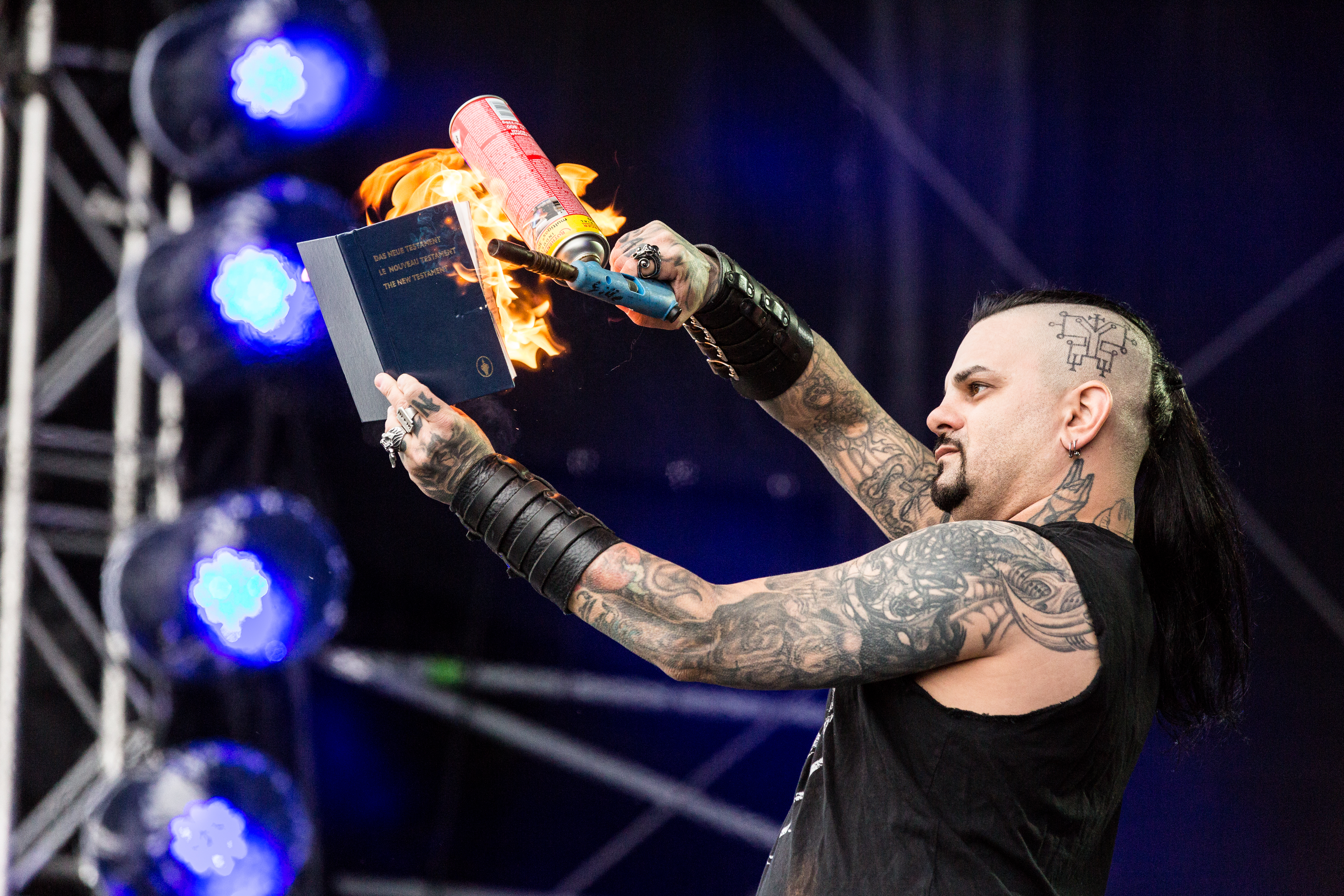
Brian Werner burning a bible, Party.San 2017

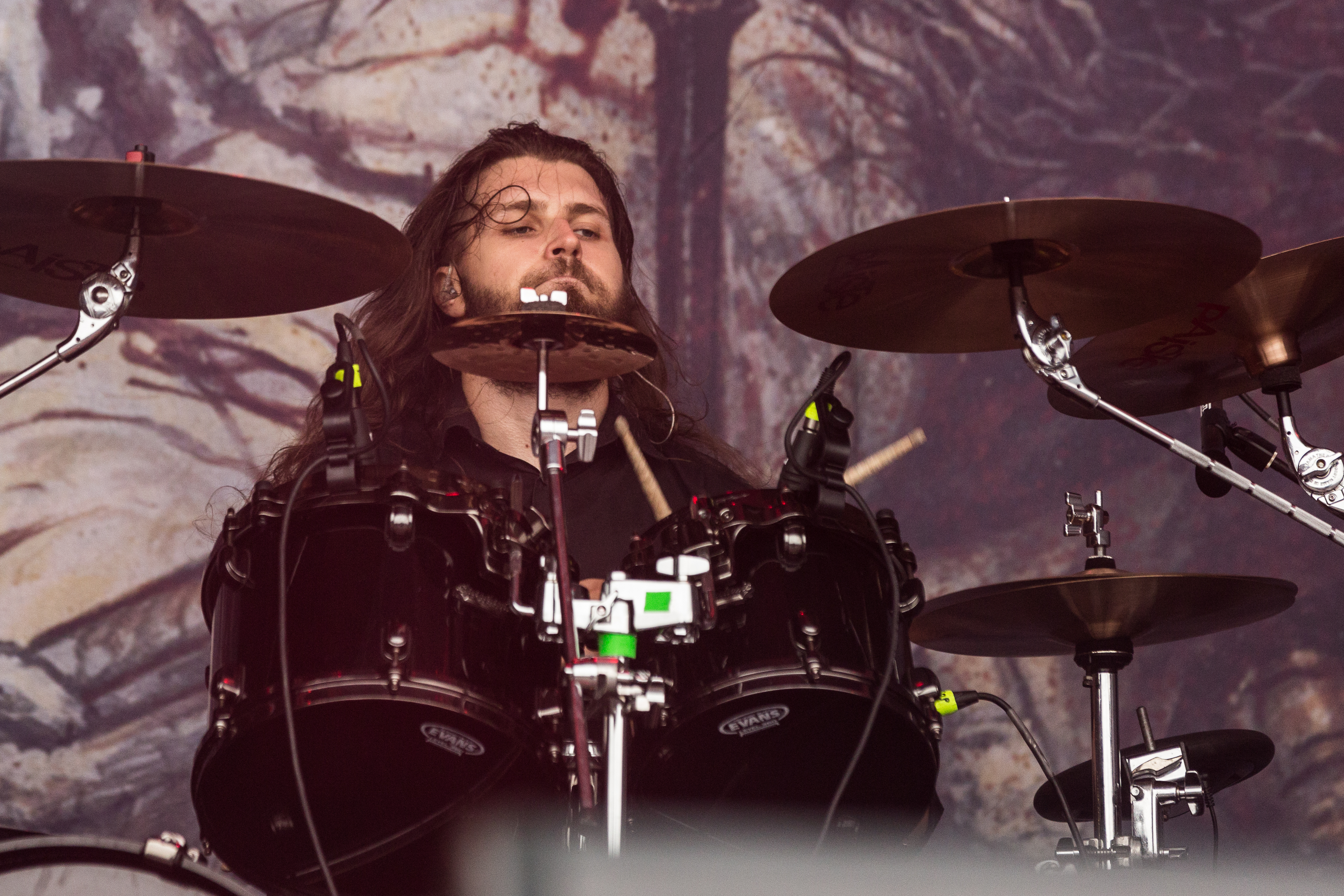
Live drummer Eugene Ryabchenko, Party.San 2017

=== Former live members ===
- Chris Ross – lead vocals (1997; died 2017)
- Aaron Weinstein – lead guitar (1998)
- Jake Raymond – lead vocals (1999, died 2018)
- Bobby Wheeler – lead vocals (2000)
- Kyle Severn – drums (2000)
- Taylor Fishman – guitars (2008–2009)
- Ron Greene – bass (2000, 2005)
- Kelly Conlon – bass (2000–2001)
- Derek Boyer – bass (2003)
- Tim Yeung – drums (2003–2007, 2009)
- Istvan Lendvay – bass (2004)
- Marco "Lord Doomus" Pitruzzella – drums (2005–2006)
- Anthony Geremia – lead vocals (2006–2007)
- Damien Boynton – lead vocals (2007–2008)
- Rodrigo "Jugulator" Raquio – vocals (2010)
- Brian Hobbie – bass (2007–2008)
- Antonio Donadeo – drums (2007–2008)
- Keshava Doane – drums (2008–2009)
- Alberto Allende – drums (2011–2012)
- Jack Blackburn – drums (2012–2014)
- Dean Arnold – lead guitar (2015–2019)
- Aaron Homma – lead guitar (2013–2014)
- Eugene Ryabchenko – drums (2016–2017)
- Scott Wily – lead vocals (2008–2011; died 2017)
- John Hate – lead guitar (2010–2011)
- Brian Weber – lead guitar (2011–2013)
- Eddy Hoffman – drums (2009–2011)
- James Payne – drums (2014–2016)
- Brian Werner – vocals (2012–2019)

== Discography ==
=== Studio albums ===
- Let Us Pray (1992)
- Into Cold Darkness (1995)
- Forever Underground (1997)
- Dawn of the Apocalypse (2000)
- Dechristianize (2003)
- Icons of Evil (2007)

=== Video albums ===
- Evil Death Live (2007)

=== EPs ===
- The Black Mass (1991)

=== Compilation albums ===
- Horrors of Hell (2006)

=== Demos ===
- Reduced to Ashes (1989)
- Excruciating Pain (1990)
