= Erik Rutan =

American musician and record producer

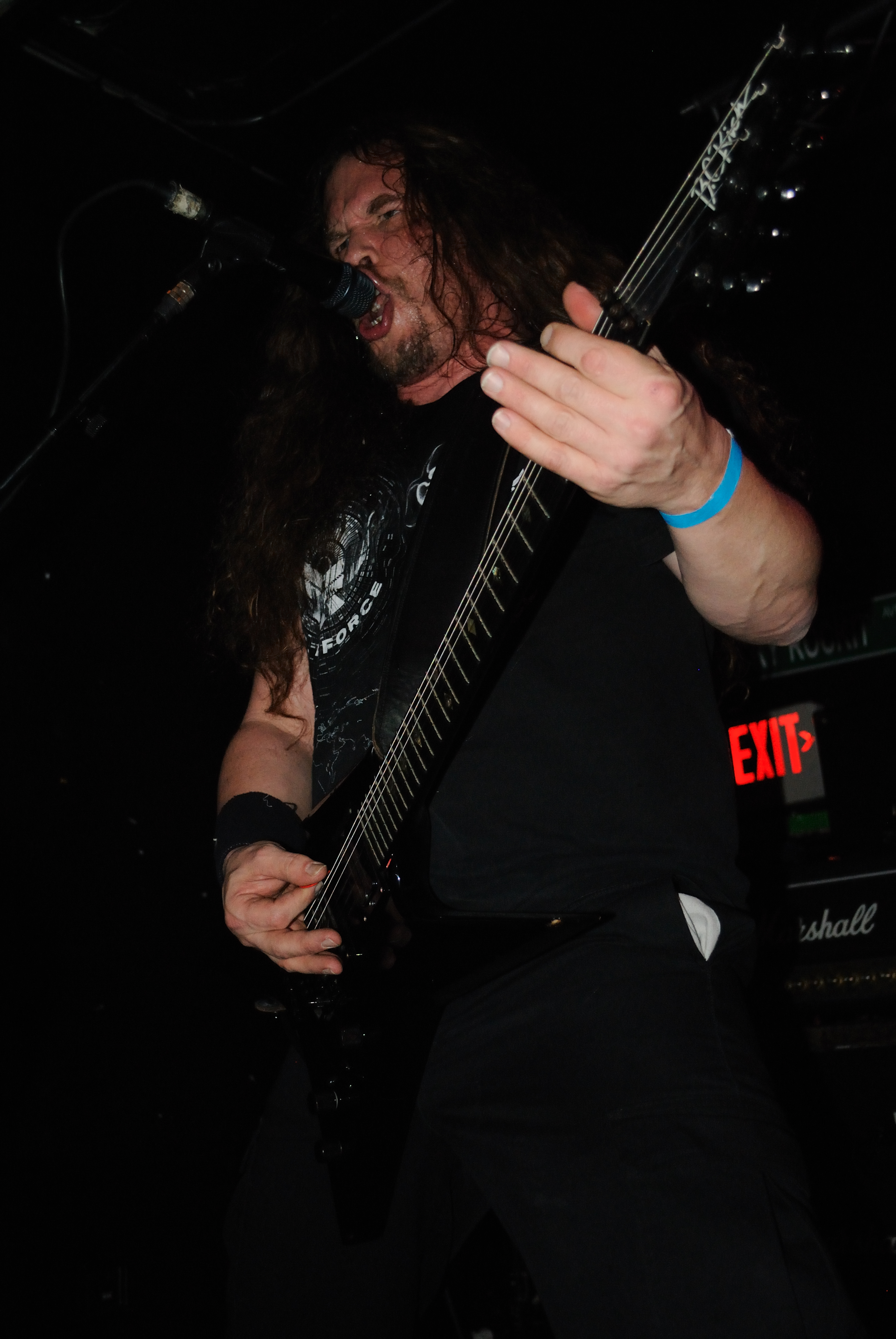
- Rutan performing in 2012

Background information
- Born: June 10, 1971 (age 55); New Jersey, U.S.
- Genres: Death metal; thrash metal; progressive metal; symphonic metal
- Occupations: Musician; record producer; songwriter
- Instruments: Guitar; vocals
- Member of: Hate Eternal; Cannibal Corpse; Alas
- Formerly of: Morbid Angel; Ripping Corpse

Erik Rutan (born June 10, 1971) is an American death metal musician and record producer. He is the guitarist and lead vocalist of death metal band Hate Eternal, as well as the lead guitarist for Cannibal Corpse. Rutan has also played with Morbid Angel and Ripping Corpse. In addition, Rutan owns and operates Mana Recording Studios in Florida.

Axl Rosenberg of MetalSucks described Rutan's production style as sounding "cold, steely, and uninviting," and called it "the aural equivalent of the desaturated colors of modern torture porn flicks."

== Early life ==
Rutan was born in New Jersey.

== Career ==
=== Ripping Corpse ===
Rutan started his music career with Ripping Corpse, recording one album titled Dreaming with the Dead released in 1991.

=== Morbid Angel ===
Rutan left Ripping Corpse in 1993 to join Morbid Angel, recording Domination (1995) before leaving in 1996 to found his own band, Hate Eternal. He returned to Morbid Angel to record 2000's Gateways to Annihilation before leaving again to concentrate on Hate Eternal. He rejoined the band once more for the band's 2006 summer tour of Europe, which featured the band's Domination lineup. The tour included a stop at the Wacken Open Air festival.

=== Hate Eternal ===
Hate Eternal released their debut album Conquering the Throne in 1999, followed by King of All Kings in 2002 and I, Monarch in 2005.

=== Cannibal Corpse ===
On January 18, 2019, it was announced that Rutan would fill in for Pat O'Brien of Cannibal Corpse for the remainder of their winter and spring tour dates. Rutan was later made the permanent lead guitarist of the band on February 2, 2021 and appears on their fifteenth studio album Violence Unimagined.

=== Other projects ===
Rutan has had a number of side projects that highlight different aspects of his playing. For example, he formed the group Alas with former Therion vocalist Martina Astner, releasing the progressive metal album Absolute Purity in 2001. Rutan was also a guest vocalist on the track "Bone Crown" on Annotations of an Autopsy's second full-length album, II: The Reign of Darkness.

== Equipment ==
Erik is a long time player of B.C. Rich guitars and has played various Ironbirds and V's with Dimarzio, EMG, Seymour Duncan, and (more recently) Fishman pickups. He has also played Ibanez guitars, mostly during his latter days with Morbid Angel and the early Hate Eternal days. During his time with Ripping Corpse, he played a Yamaha superstrat guitar (most likely an RGX model). For Morbid Angel, he used a Gibson Explorer outfitted with a Floyd Rose bridge and an Ibanez Universe guitar given to him by Trey Azagthoth. Recently, B.C. Rich created an Erik Rutan custom 7-string Ironbird with Fishman Fluence pickups and this is now his main guitar for Cannibal Corpse. Erik uses various amps from various companies including Marshall, ENGL, and Mesa Boogie.

In 2021 Rutan got an endorsement with B.C. Rich, he now has his own signature 7 String Ironbird.

== Personal life ==
Rutan engages in yoga stretches and meditation prior to performing live.

In 2002, Rutan contracted a foodborne illness from escherichia coli after eating what he believed was a "bad steak" from a truck stop in North Carolina while en route to Portland. In the music history book Raising Hell, he recounted having severe diarrhea and passing out from dehydration. This led to him having to go to the hospital, cancel the show, and be on a special diet for a month.

In 2024, Rutan lost 90% of everything he owned due to Hurricane Helene and Hurricane Milton, which required him to leave a European tour with Cannibal Corpse early.

As documented by Granville Guitars, two of his retired custom shop BC Rich Ironbirds, as well as his Gibson Explorer and his Ibanez Universe from his days with Morbid Angel have been restored to playing condition.

== Production discography ==
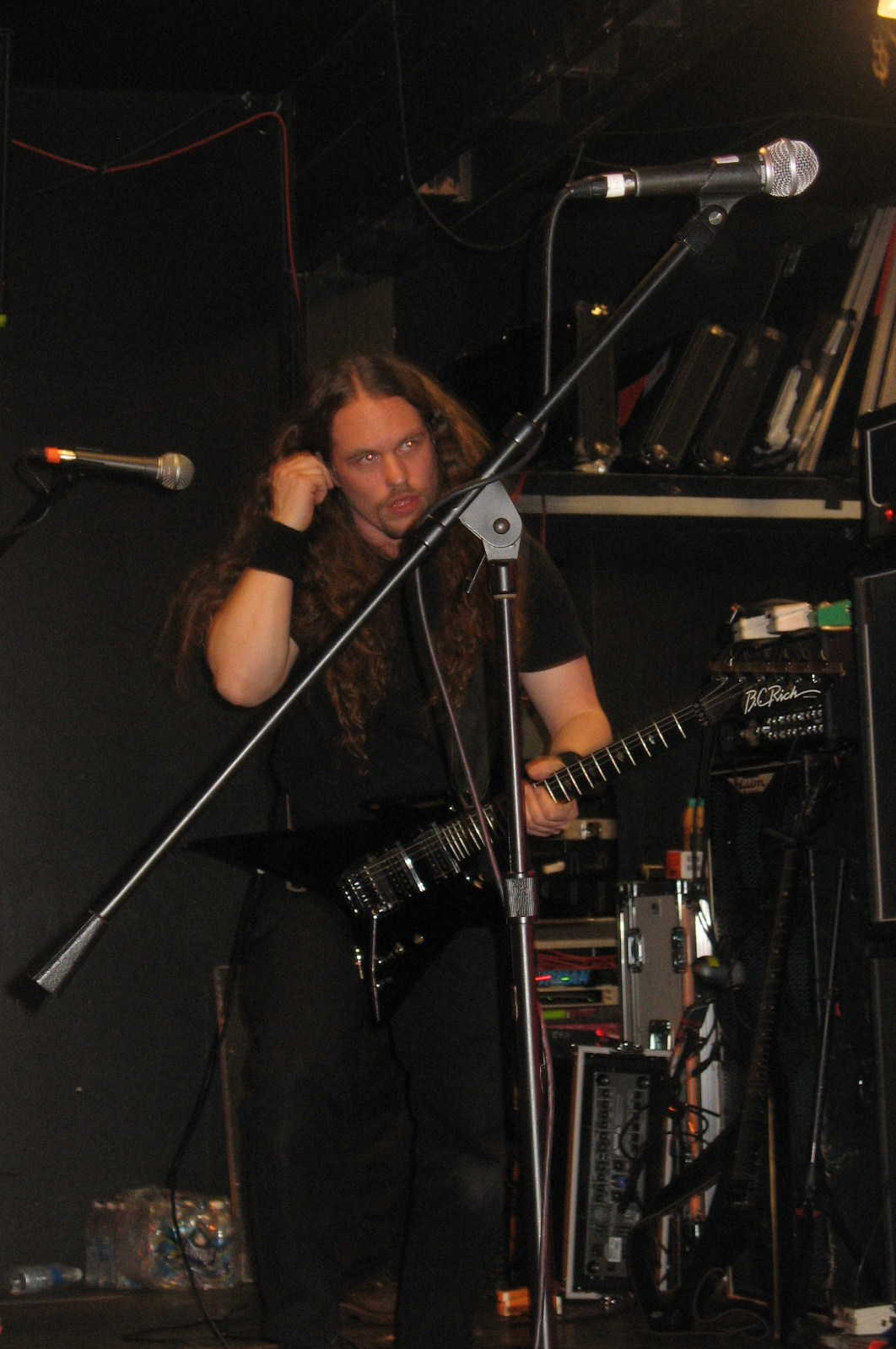
Rutan in 2008

Rutan has produced the following albums:

- Belphegor: Conjuring the Dead
- Cannibal Corpse: Kill, Evisceration Plague, Torture, Red Before Black, Violence Unimagined, Chaos Horrific
- Madball: Empire
- Agnostic Front: My Life My Way
- Six Feet Under: Commandment
- Annotations of an Autopsy: II: The Reign of Darkness
- Morbid Angel: Illud Divinum Insanus (drum production), Kingdoms Disdained
- Soilent Green: Inevitable Collapse in the Presence of Conviction, Confrontation
- Through the Eyes of the Dead: Malice
- Goatwhore: A Haunting Curse, Carving Out The Eyes of God, Blood for the Master, Constricting Rage of the Merciless
- Vital Remains: Icons of Evil
- Malevolent Creation: Invidious Dominion (co-producer)
- Nile: Those Whom the Gods Detest (drum production)
- Krisiun: Conquerors of Armageddon, Forged in Fury
- Pessimist: Slaughtering The Faithful
- Internal Suffering: Internal Suffering, Awakening of the Rebel
- Premonitions of War: Left In Kowloon
- Aeon: Path of Fire (mixing)
- In Battle: Welcome to the Battlefield
- The Absence: From Your Grave
- Pathology: Legacy of the Ancients
- Avulsed: Gorespattered Suicide
- Into the Moat: The Design, The Campaign (album)
- Torture Killer: Swarm! (mixing)
- Pain Principle: Waiting For The Flies
- Covenance: Ravaging The Pristine
- Ophiolatry: Anti-Evangelistic Process
- Devourment: Conceived in Sewage
- The Mountain Goats: All Eternals Deck (four songs)
- Masacre: Total Death
- Tombs: Savage Gold
- Ephel Duath: Hemmed By Light, Shaped By Darkness, On Death and Cosmos
- Rivers of Nihil: The Conscious Seed of Light
