= Jared Anderson (heavy metal musician) =

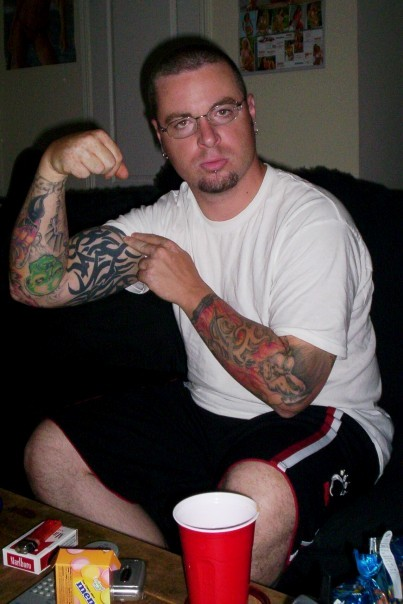

Background information
- Born: December 28, 1974
- Died: October 14, 2006 (aged 31) Covington, Kentucky, U.S.
- Genres: Death metal
- Occupation: Musician
- Instruments: Vocals, bass, guitar
- Formerly of: Morbid Angel; Hate Eternal

Jared W. Anderson (December 28, 1974 – October 14, 2006) was an American death metal musician best known as the bassist and vocalist of Morbid Angel from 2001 to 2002 and Hate Eternal from 1998 to 2003.

Jared Anderson formed his first band, Internecine, in December, 1997 at the age of 22, and saw his six-year career interrupted in 2003 when he was forced to leave Hate Eternal as a result of struggles with substance abuse. He co-wrote all of the songs for Internecine with Shannon Purdon and released two demos, one in 1993 and another in 1997. The Book of Lambs was released in 2001.

Jared Anderson died in his sleep of an unspecified cause in 2006. Shortly before his death, he had started a new project called As One... with Steve Tucker, also a former member of Morbid Angel. His last recording was a guest appearance in The Allknowing's cover of Motörhead's "Ace of Spades" which, since 2007, has been freely accessible online.

The 2008 Hate Eternal album, Fury & Flames, was dedicated to Jared Anderson's memory.

== Discography ==
- 1999 - Hate Eternal - Conquering the Throne (bass, vocals)
- 2001 - Internecine - The Book of Lambs (bass, guitars, vocals)
- 2002 - Hate Eternal - King of All Kings (bass, vocals)
