= Winter Hours (album) =

- Album cover artwork by Thomas Hooper

Studio album by Tombs
- Released: February 17, 2009
- Genre: Avant-garde metal, post-metal, black metal
- Length: 37:03
- Label: Relapse Records CD, LP (RR7021)
- Producer: Mike Hill

Tombs chronology
Winter Hours (2009)	Fear Is the Weapon (2010)

Professional ratings
Review scores
Source	Rating
Allmusic	3.5/5 stars
Exclaim!	(favorable)
Pitchfork	7.1
Sputnikmusic	4/5 stars

Winter Hours is the debut full-length studio album from American metal band Tombs, released on February 17, 2009, through Relapse Records in CD, LP and digital download formats.

== Track listing ==
No.	Title	Length
1.	"Gosssamer"	5:33
2.	"Golden Eyes"	3:00
3.	"Beneath the Toxic Jungle"	4:32
4.	"The Great Silence"	4:31
5.	"Story of a Room"	2:06
6.	"The Divide"	3:37
7.	"Merrimack"	3:56
8.	"Filled with Secrets"	5:24
9.	"Seven Stars the Angel of Death"	3:35
10.	"Old Dominion"	1:31
Total length:		37:03

== Personnel ==
Tombs

- Mike Hill – vocals, guitar
- Carson Daniel James – bass
- Justin Ennis – drums

Production

- Mike Hill – production
- Alan Douches – mastering
- Ian Whalen – audio engineering, mixing
- John Chambers – engineering

Art

- Thomas Hooper – album artwork
