= Ripping Corpse =

American death metal band

- Origin: Red Bank, New Jersey, U.S.
- Genres: Death metal; thrash metal
- Years active: 1987–1995
- Labels: Kraze/Maze America; Under One Flag
- Past members: Scott Ruth; Shaune Kelley; Dave Bizzigotti; Brandon Thomas; Scott Hornick; Erik Rutan

Ripping Corpse was a death metal band formed in 1987 in Red Bank, New Jersey by singer Scott Ruth, guitarist Shaune Kelley, and drummer Brandon Thomas.

They recorded the demos Death Warmed Over in 1987, Splattered Remains in 1988, and Glorious Depravity in 1990, and one full-length studio album, Dreaming with the Dead in 1991.

== History ==
Ripping Corpse released the album Dreaming with the Dead (1991), and three demos. Members included singer Scott Ruth, guitarist Shaune Kelley, and drummer Brandon Thomas. They added future Morbid Angel guitarist Erik Rutan, who went on to form Hate Eternal. They also added Scott Hornick.

Rutan left Ripping Corpse to join Morbid Angel around 1993, and recorded Domination. Later that year, Hornick left the band to attend Boston's Berklee College of Music in Massachusetts. The remaining members split-up and later formed Dim Mak.

The band took its name from the second song on Kreator's second album, Pleasure to Kill. The band's lyrics typically were horror-themed.

== Discography ==
- Death Warmed Over, Independent, 1987 (demo)
- Splattered Remains, Independent, 1988 (demo)
- Glorious Depravity, Independent, 1990 (demo)
- Dreaming with the Dead, Kraze/Maze America, 1991 (LP)
- Industry, Independent, 1992 (demo)

== Personnel ==
- Scott Ruth: vocals
- Shaune Kelley: guitars
- Erik Rutan: guitars
- Scott Hornick: bass
- Brandon Thomas: drums
