= Hate Eternal =

American death metal band

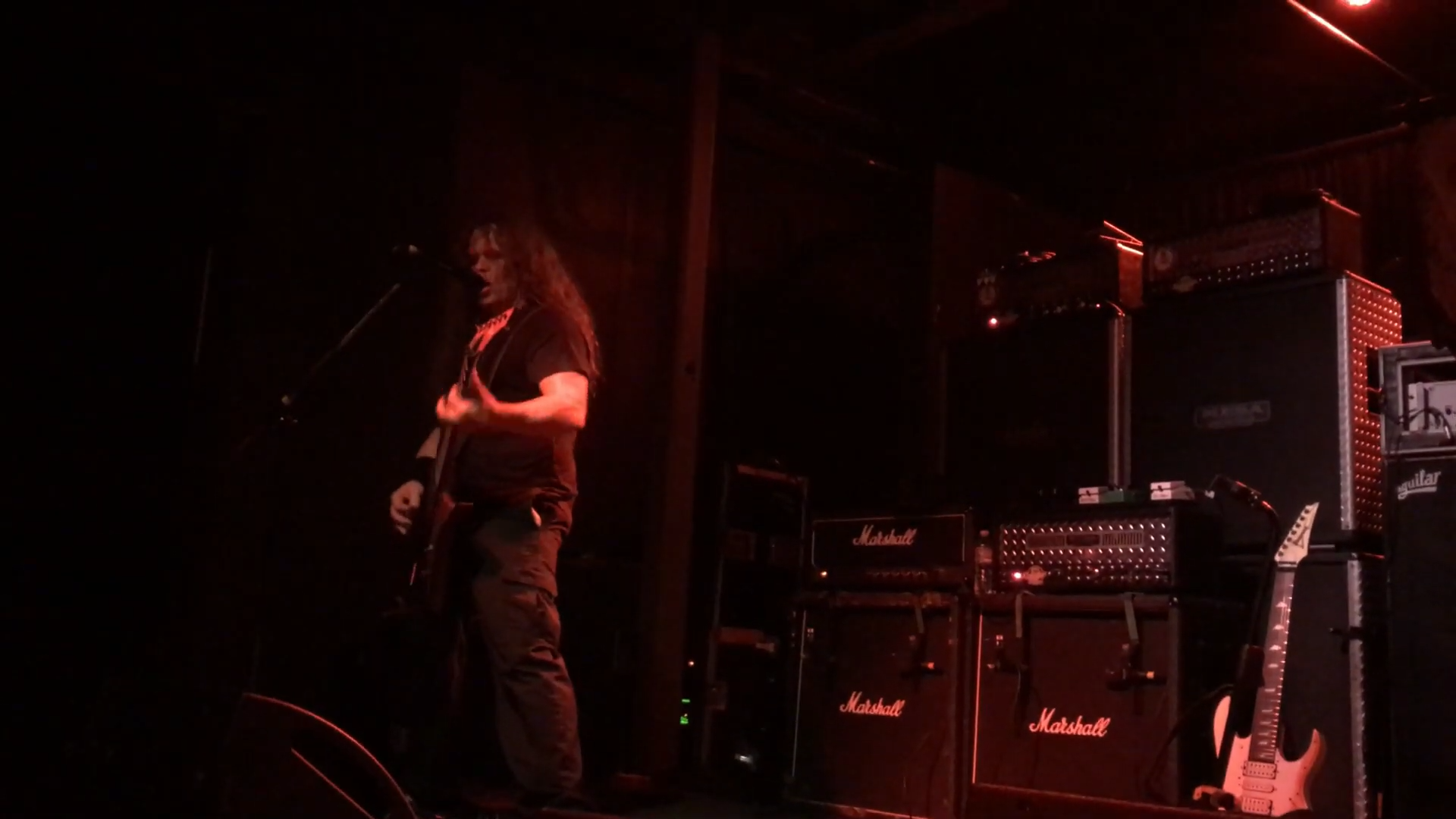
- Vocalist/guitarist Erik Rutan in 2018

Background information
- Origin: St. Petersburg, Florida, U.S.
- Genre: Death metal
- Years active: 1997–present
- Labels: Earache, Metal Blade, Season of Mist
- Members: Erik Rutan; J.J. Hrubovcak; John Longstreth
- Past members: Tim Yeung; Jared Anderson; Doug Cerrito; Derek Roddy; Randy Piro; Eric Hersemann; Jade Simonetto; Shaune Kelley; Chason Westmoreland; Hannes Grossmann
- Website: hateeternal.net

Hate Eternal is a Florida death metal band from St. Petersburg, Florida. The band currently consists of founding guitarist/vocalist Erik Rutan, bassist J.J. Hrubovcak and drummer John Longstreth. To date, Hate Eternal has released seven studio albums: Conquering the Throne (1999), King of All Kings (2002), I, Monarch (2005), Fury & Flames (2008), Phoenix Amongst the Ashes (2011), Infernus (2015), and Upon Desolate Sands (2018). All albums were produced by Rutan.

== History ==
Hate Eternal was formed in St. Petersburg, Florida in 1997. The original lineup included lead guitarist and lead vocalist Erik Rutan, bassist and backing vocalist Jared Anderson, drummer Tim Yeung, and rhythm guitarist Doug Cerrito. The name came from a Ripping Corpse demo song.

In 2000, drummer Derek Roddy replaced Tim Yeung and toured for Conquering the Throne. In 2002, the band recorded their second album, King of All Kings, as a trio with Rutan, Anderson and Roddy. That summer, Rutan left Morbid Angel, stating that he wished to devote more time to Hate Eternal.

International touring to promote King of All Kings followed, including a video on MTV2 program Headbanger's Ball for the single "Powers That Be". Anderson left the group due to a drug problem. South Florida musician Randy Piro filled in for Anderson. After their last tour for the album in December 2003, the group began work on new material.

Hate Eternal began work on the follow-up to King of All Kings, I, Monarch, in 2004. Recording began in the fall, and the album was released on June 28, 2005. Hailed by critics and fans, the album added percussion elements to their sound while retaining the speed and brutality of the genre.

After a difficult US tour over the summer of 2005 and a number of business problems, the group canceled their European tour, scheduled for the fall. After spending much of the winter dealing with internal differences and personal situations, Roddy announced his departure from Hate Eternal in late March 2006.

With pending tour obligations, Rutan and Piro recruited drummer Kevin Talley for US appearances in the Spring, and Reno Killerich for the group's rescheduled European run. On July 26, 2007, Rutan announced Jade Simonetto as the band's new permanent drummer.

A music video for the song "Bringer of Storms" was shot overnight January 16, 2008, by David Brodsky. Earlier in the day, the band was in a minor traffic accident that disabled their van. Securing a rental and rushing to New York to play their first show with the new lineup, Hate Eternal arrived at BB King's just as the headlining act, The Black Dahlia Murder, were leaving the stage. Still wearing their jackets, Hate Eternal went onstage and performed five songs to the remaining crowd. Having completed that leg of the journey, they drove into Brooklyn to shoot with Brodsky. Once the shoot concluded, at approximately 7am, the band had not slept in 48 hours, yet rejoined the tour. The video aired on MTV2's Headbanger's Ball in February 2008. In 2008, the band recruited bassist J.J. Hrubovcak.

The band released their fifth album, Phoenix Amongst the Ashes, in 2011. Rutan commented that "we have come up with one of [our] heaviest, most twisted, evil, melodic, and insane albums yet".

In October 2014, Hate Eternal signed to Season of Mist. In 2014, the band recruited drummer Chason Westmoreland.

In the spring of 2015, Hate Eternal toured North America with Deicide and Entombed A.D. The band left the tour early after Rutan injured his hand falling down a flight of stairs. Rutan recalled, "It was a bloody massacre and my hand blew up to five times its normal size. Glen from Deicide asked somebody to get some ice. I was hoping, 'Ahh, it will heal in a day or two.' It took three months to fully heal." He required physical therapy following the incident.

The band's sixth album, Infernus, was released on August 21, 2015.

Westmoreland left the band in October 2015 due to "family matters". Drummer Hannes Grossmann was brought in for the band's North American tour.

The band released its seventh studio album, Upon Desolate Sands, on October 26, 2018.

Rutan has stated that the band intends to release a follow-up album but admitted that his obligations with Cannibal Corpse and Mana Recording remain his priority for the time being.

== Band members ==
Hate Eternal performing in Rochester, New York in 2018

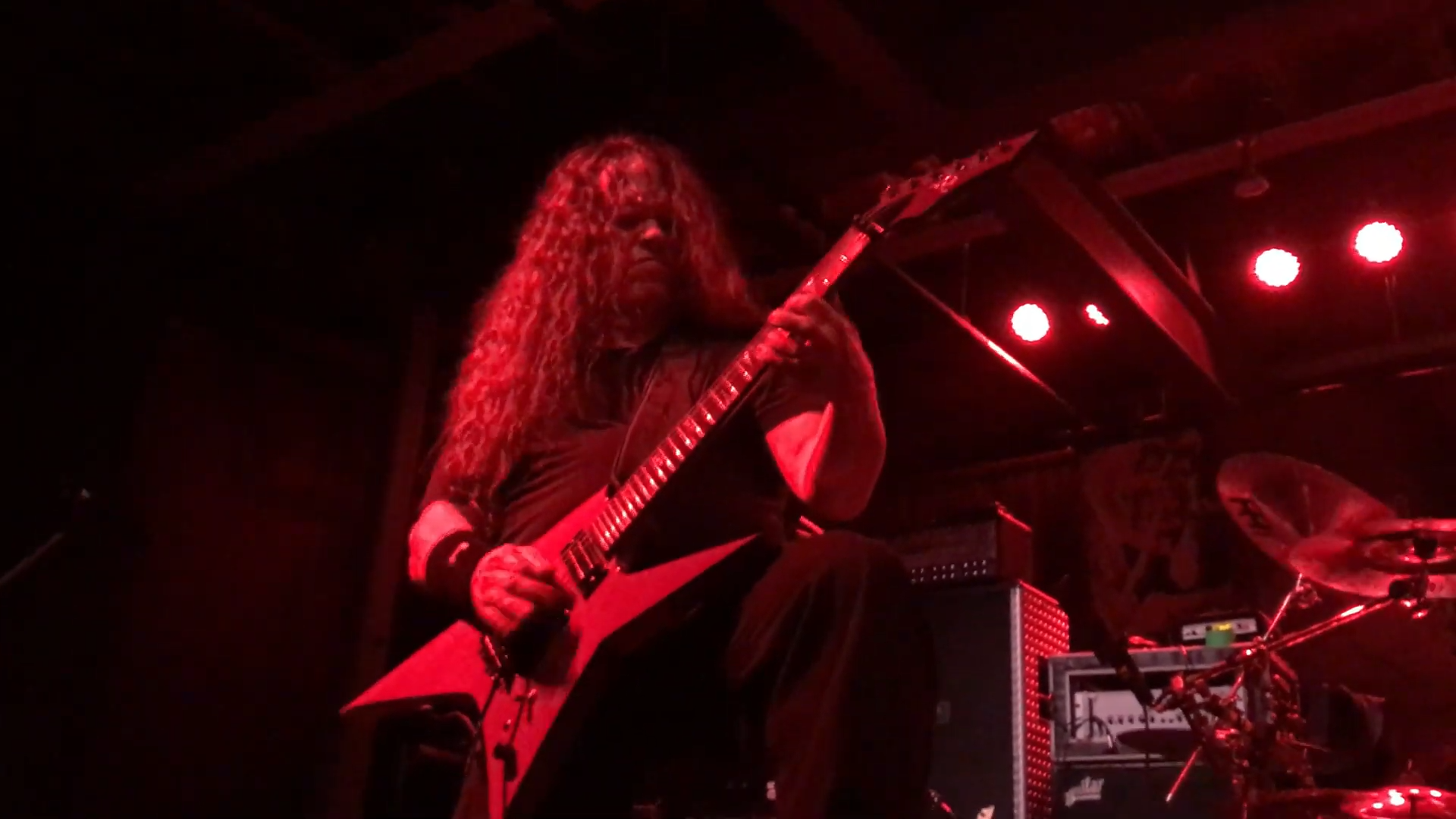
Erik Rutan

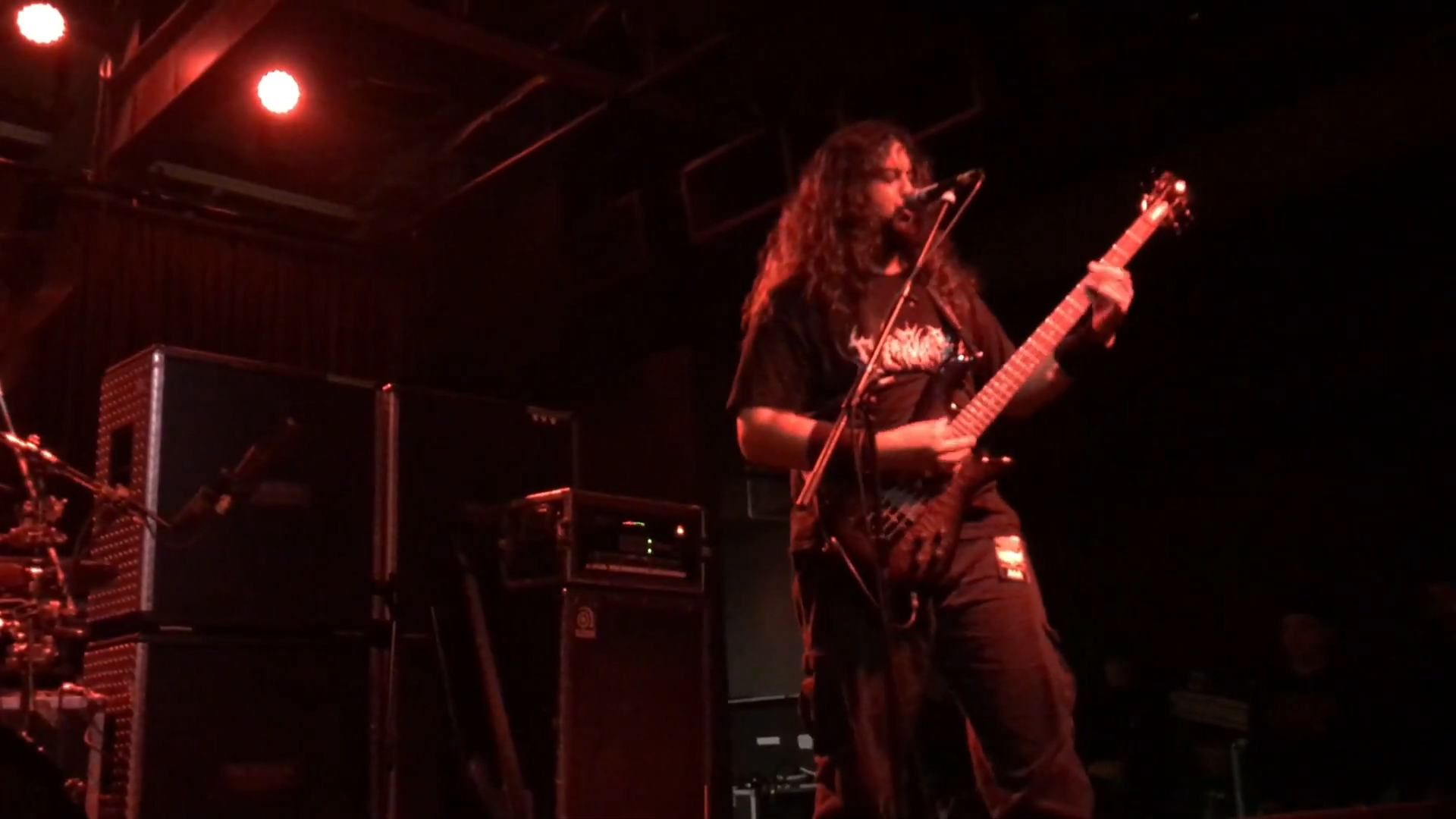
Art Paiz

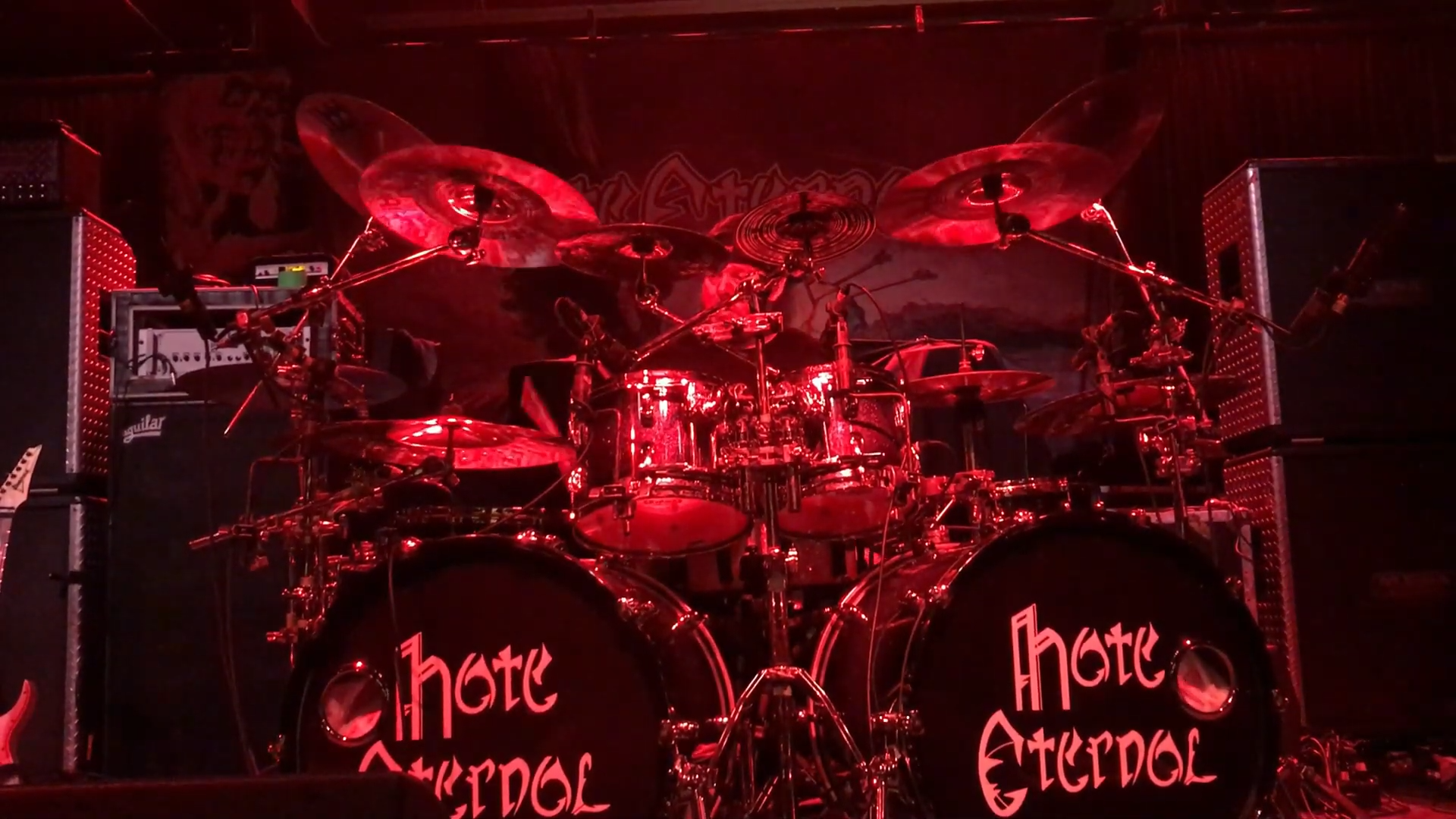
John Longstreth

Current members

- Erik Rutan – lead guitar, lead vocals (1997–present); rhythm guitar (1997–1999, 2000–2005, 2006–2007, 2008–present)
- J.J. Hrubovcak – bass, backing vocals (2008–present)
- John Longstreth – drums (2021–present, live 2018–2021)

Former members

- Tim Yeung – drums (1997–2000)
- Doug Cerrito – rhythm guitar (1999–2000)
- Jared Anderson – bass, backing vocals (1998–2003; died 2006)
- Derek Roddy – drums (2000–2006)
- Eric Hersemann – rhythm guitar (2005–2006)
- Randy Piro – bass, backing vocals (2003–2007)
- Shaune Kelley – rhythm guitar, backing vocals (2007–2009)
- Jade Simonetto – drums (2007–2013)
- Chason Westmoreland – drums (2014–2015)
- Hannes Grossmann – drums (2015–2018)

Live members

- Reno Kiilerich – drums (2006)
- Kevin Talley – drums (2006)
- Makoto Mizoguchi – bass (2008)
- Adam Jarvis – drums (2013)
- Art Paiz – bass, backing vocals (2016–present)

Session members

- Alex Webster – bass (1997, 2008)

== Discography ==
=== Studio albums ===
Title	Album details	Peak chart positions		Sales
Title	Album details	US Heat	US Ind	Sales
Conquering the Throne	Released: November 2, 1999; Label: Earache Records; Formats: CD, LP, CS, digital download	—	—	
King of All Kings	Released: September 17, 2002; Label: Earache Records; Formats: CD, LP, digital download	—	—	
I, Monarch	Released: June 28, 2005; Label: Earache Records; Formats: CD, LP, CD+DVD, digital download	—	—	
Fury & Flames	Released: February 19, 2008; Label: Metal Blade Records; Formats: CD, LP, digital download	20	49	US: 2,300+
Phoenix Amongst the Ashes	Released: May 10, 2011; Label: Metal Blade Records; Formats: CD, LP, digital download	18	—	US: 3,200+
Infernus	Released: August 21, 2015; Label: Season of Mist; Formats: CD, LP, digital download	9	36	
Upon Desolate Sands	Released: October 26, 2018; Label: Season of Mist; Formats: CD, LP, Cassette Tape, Digital download			
"—" denotes a recording that did not chart or was not released in that territory.

=== Live albums ===
Title	Album details
Live in London	Released: December 10, 2010; Label: Earache Records; Formats: digital download

=== Video albums ===
Title	Album details
The Perilous Fight	Released: October 16, 2006; Label: Earache Records; Formats: DVD

=== Music videos ===
Title	Year	Directed	Album
"Powers That Be"	2002	—	King Of All Kings
"I, Monarch"	2005	Shane Drake	I, Monarch
"The Victorious Reign"	2005	Shane Drake	I, Monarch
"Bringer of Storms"	2008	David Brodsky	Fury And Flames
"Lake Ablaze"	2011	David Brodsky	Phoenix Amongst The Ashes
