= List of Cynic band members =

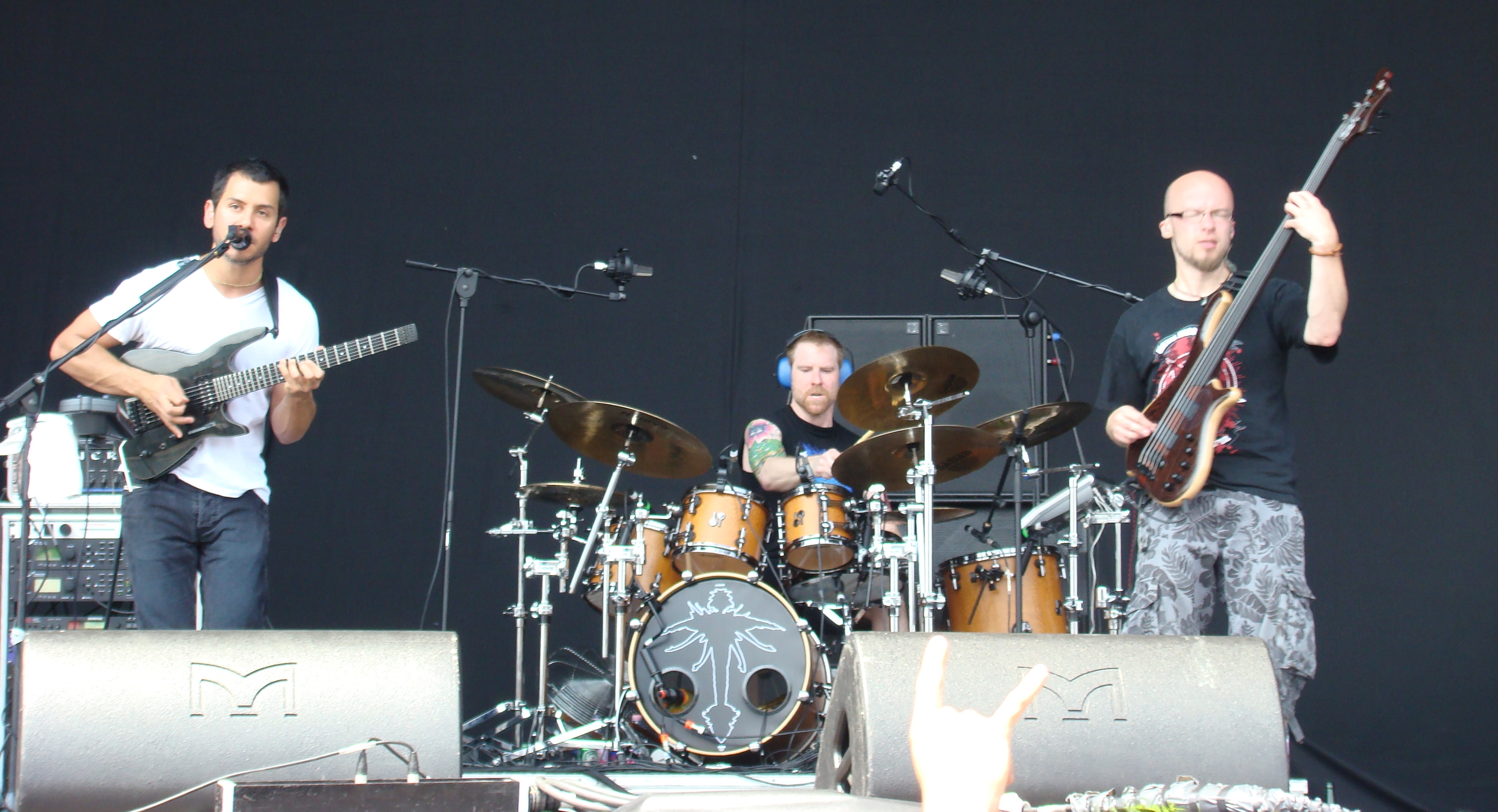
Cynic performing live in 2009.

Cynic is an American progressive metal band from Miami, Florida. Formed in 1987, the group originally consisted of vocalist Esteban "Steve" Rincon, guitarists Paul Masvidal and Russell Mofsky, bassist Mark van Erp, and drummer Sean Reinert. As of May 2025, the group's current lineup features Masvidal on guitar and vocals, Brandon Giffin on bass (from 2011 to 2014, and since 2022), guitarist Mike Gilbert (since 2024) and drummer Michel Bélanger (since 2025).

== History ==
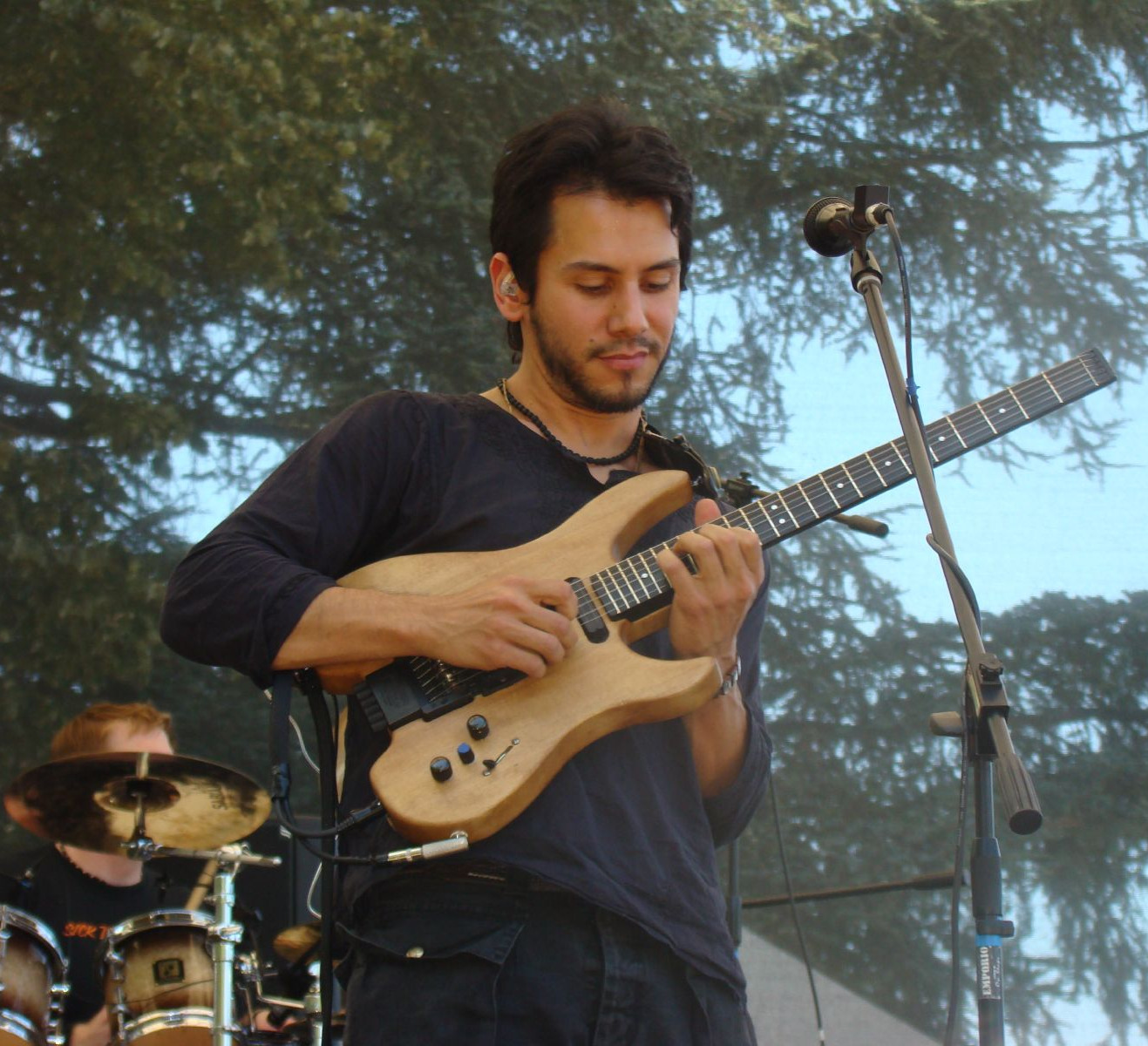
Guitarist Paul Masvidal, the band's only constant member, took over vocal duties after the band's first demo in 1988.

=== 1987–1994 ===
Cynic was formed in November 1987 by guitarist Paul Masvidal and drummer Sean Reinert, who had previously worked together in a band called Seaweed. The original lineup also included vocalist Esteban "Steve" Rincon, second guitarist Russell Mofsky and bassist Mark van Erp. Rincon and Mofsky left after just a few months, with Jack Kelly brought in on vocals for the band's first demo during early 1988. Shortly after the demo's release, Kelly left and Masvidal took over vocal duties, with Jason Gobel brought in as second guitarist. The new lineup recorded a second demo, Reflections of a Dying World, before van Erp was replaced by Tony Choy a few months later.

In 1991, Cynic signed with Roadrunner Records and began writing for their full-length debut album. Recording was delayed due to Masvidal and Reinert working with the band Death, then by Hurricane Andrew which destroyed Gobel's home and the band's rehearsal space. By the time the band regrouped in early 1993, Sean Malone had replaced Choy, who had chosen to focus on working with Atheist. Gobel also claimed that Choy "wanted to do things differently". After the release of Focus in September 1993, Cynic played a run of shows in Europe with stand-in bassist Chris Kringel, as Malone was unavailable due to teaching commitments, although he did return for North American shows the next year. Tony Teegarden also performed at the 1993 shows, contributing harsh vocals and keyboards, with Dana Cosley taking over for the 1994 shows.

Cynic disbanded after the last show of the Focus tour in July 1994, with Masvidal, Gobel, Kringel and Reinert briefly continuing to work together under the name Portal. This band's only release, a self-titled demo from 1995, was later reissued in 2012 under the Cynic name as a compilation entitled The Portal Tapes.

=== 2006–2015 ===
In September 2006, it was announced that Cynic had reformed for a string of 2007 festival appearances, with mainstays Paul Masvidal and Sean Reinert joined by former touring members Chris Kringel and Tony Teegarden, plus new guitarist Santiago Dobles. By the following March, Dobles had been dismissed from the band, which commented that "due to the commitment required for the reunion, it was mutually agreed that another guitar player would be better suited". Former member Jason Gobel was invited to rejoin, but had to turn down the offer due to "family and work commitments". Dobles was replaced in April by David "Mavis" Senescu. In June, the band announced Teegarden's departure due to financial reasons, with his harsh vocals covered by backing tracks.

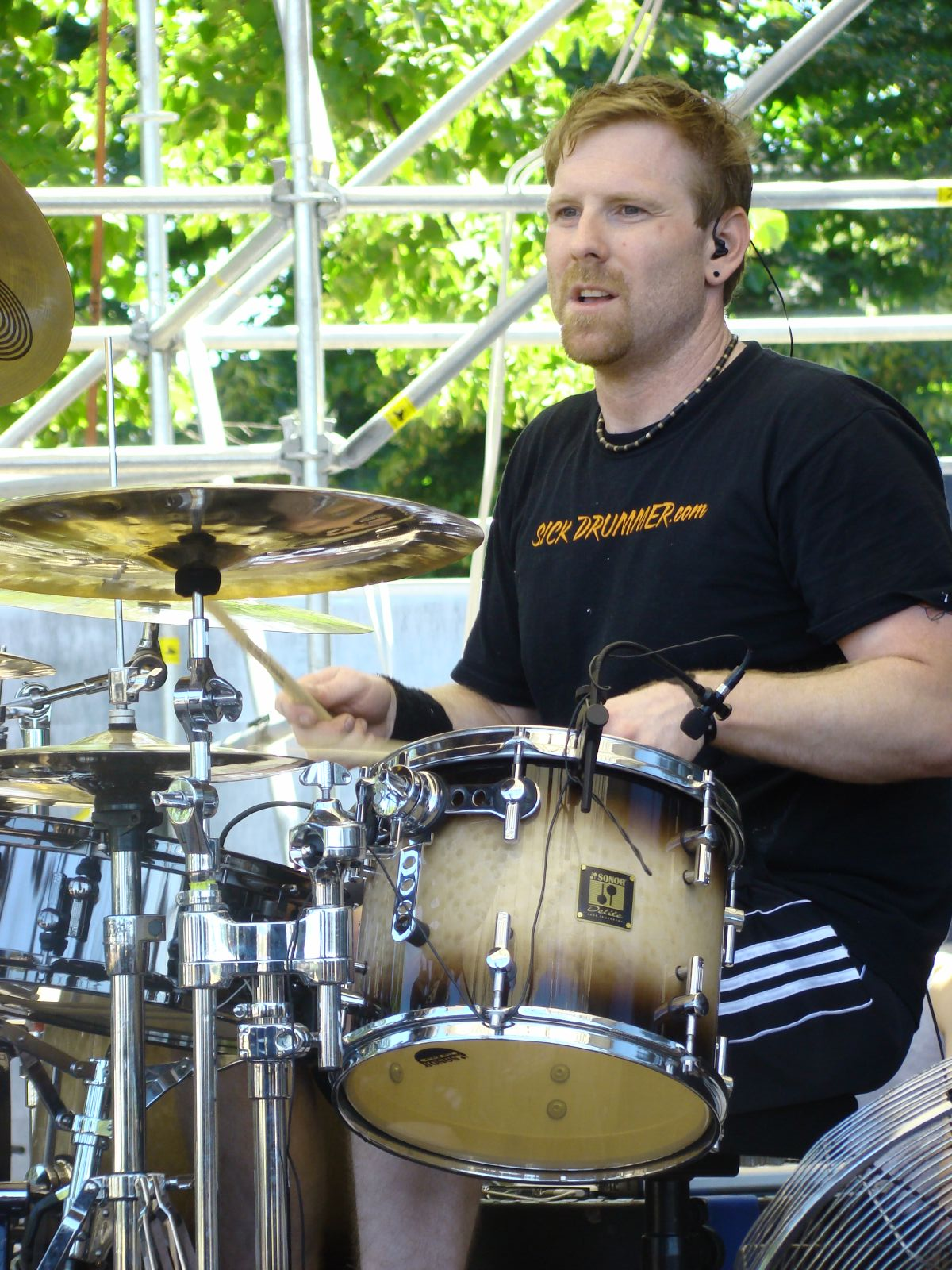
Founding drummer Sean Reinert returned when Cynic reformed in 2006, until 2015.

In early 2008, Cynic announced a new record deal with Season of Mist, as well as the return of Sean Malone on bass and the addition of Tymon Kruidenier on guitar and harsh vocals. Malone was only able to commit to recording, however, so Robin Zielhorst took over for subsequent touring after the release of Traced in Air. This new lineup released the EP Re-Traced in 2010, before the band parted ways with Kruidenier and Zielhorst that December due to the "logistical challenges of maintaining a band that is half based in the Netherlands and the other half in the United States". Masvidal and Reinert recorded Carbon-Based Anatomy in the summer of 2011 with Malone on bass.

Kruidenier and Zielhorst were replaced in Cynic's touring lineup by Max Phelps and Brandon Giffin, respectively, who were announced in October 2011. The studio lineup of Masvidal, Reinert and Malone started recording a third album in late 2012, which was released as Kindly Bent to Free Us in February 2014. Following the album's release, Malone returned to playing live with Cynic for the first time in 20 years, starting at Graspop Metal Meeting in June 2014. The following September, Reinert claimed that Cynic had broken up again, citing "artistic and personal differences". Masvidal quickly responded by assuring that the band would continue "one way or another".

=== Since 2015 ===
A week after Sean Reinert claimed that Cynic had broken up, Paul Masvidal and Sean Malone enlisted Matt Lynch to take over on drums starting with a festival performance in October 2015. The band remained relatively inactive for the next two years, before Masvidal and Reinert "reached a settlement" in December 2017 which allowed the former to continue using the band's name without the latter. The following month, the band released its first song without Reinert, "Humanoid". Reinert died a couple of years later, in January 2020. Less than a year later, in December 2020, Malone also died. In September 2021, the band released a recording of "Integral" featuring the bassist.

In November 2021, Cynic released its fourth album Ascension Codes, which featured Masdival and Lynch alongside session keyboardist Dave Mackay (in place of a bassist). The band returned to performing live in January 2023, with Masvidal and Lynch joined by returning guitarist Max Phelps and bassist Brandon Giffin, plus new keyboardist Zeke Kaplan. Mike Gilbert replaced Phelps in January 2024. For a tour that March, Obscura frontman Steffen Kummerer also joined the band, providing harsh vocals. Lynch also left Cynic after ten years in May 2025, with Michel Bélanger of Gorguts taking his place.

== Members ==
=== Current ===
Image	Name	Years active	Instruments	Release contributions
	Paul Masvidal	1987–1994; 2006–present	guitar; keyboards; guitar synthesizer; lead vocals (since mid-1988)	all Cynic releases
	Brandon Giffin	2011–2014 (touring only); 2022–present	bass	Audiotree from Nothing (2024)
	Mike Gilbert	2024–present	guitar	none to date
	Michel Bélanger	2025–present	drums	none to date

=== Former ===
Image	Name	Years active	Instruments	Release contributions
	Sean Reinert	1987–1994; 2006–2015; (died 2020)	drums; percussion; keyboards	all Cynic releases from the 1988 demo to Kindly Bent to Free Us (2014)
	Mark van Erp	1987–1989	bass	1988 demo; Reflections of a Dying World (1989)
	Esteban "Steve" Rincon	1987–1988	vocals	none
	Russell Mofsky	1987–1988	guitar	none
	Jack Kelly	1988	vocals	1988 demo
	Jason Gobel	1988–1994	guitar; keyboards; guitar synthesizer	Reflections of a Dying World (1989); 1990 demo; 1991 demo; Focus (1993)
	Tony Choy	1989–1993	bass	1990 demo; 1991 demo
	Sean Malone	1993–1994; 2008–2020 (session only until summer 2014); (died 2020)	bass; Chapman stick	all Cynic releases from Focus (1993) to "Integral" (2021), except Re-Traced (2010)
	Chris Kringel	1993 (touring); 2006–2008	bass	none (features on The Portal Tapes, recorded by Portal in 1994/1995 and later re-released under the Cynic name in 2012)
	Tony Teegarden	1993 (touring); 2006–2007	keyboards; harsh vocals	Focus (1993); "Humanoid" (2018)
	Santiago Dobles	2006–2007	guitar	none
	David "Mavis" Senescu	2007–2008	guitar; keyboards; guitar synthesizers	none
	Tymon Kruidenier	2008–2010	guitar; keyboards; guitar synthesizers; harsh vocals	Traced in Air (2008); Re-Traced (2010)
	Robin Zielhorst	2008–2010	bass	Re-Traced (2010)
	Max Phelps	2011–2015 (touring only); 2022–2024	guitar; harsh vocals	Audiotree from Nothing (2024)
	Matt Lynch	2015–2025	drums; percussion	"Humanoid" (2018); Ascension Codes (2021); Audiotree from Nothing (2024)
	Zeke Kaplan	2022–2024	keyboards	none

=== Touring ===
Image	Name	Years active	Instruments	Details
	Dana Cosley	1994	keyboards; harsh vocals	Cosley took over from Tony Teegarden on keyboards and vocals for the 1994 Focus North American tour.
	Steffen Kummerer	2024	harsh vocals	Kummerer joined Cynic's touring lineup for a string of Focus 30th anniversary European shows in March 2024.

== Lineups ==
Period	Members	Releases
November 1987–early 1988	Steve Rincon — vocals; Paul Masvidal — guitar; Russell Mofsky — guitar; Mark van Erp — bass; Sean Reinert — drums	none
Early–mid 1988	Jack Kelly — vocals; Paul Masvidal — guitar; Mark van Erp — bass; Sean Reinert — drums	untitled 1988 demo
Mid 1988–early 1989	Paul Masvidal — vocals, guitar; Jason Gobel — guitar; Mark van Erp — bass; Sean Reinert — drums	Reflections of a Dying World (1989)
Early 1989–early 1993	Paul Masvidal — vocals, guitar; Jason Gobel — guitar; Tony Choy — bass; Sean Reinert — drums	untitled 1990 demo; untitled 1991 demo
Early–fall 1993	Paul Masvidal — vocals, guitar, keyboards; Jason Gobel — guitar, keyboards; Sean Malone — bass, Chapman stick; Sean Reinert — drums, percussion, keyboards	Focus (1993)
Fall/late 1993	Paul Masvidal — vocals, guitar, keyboards; Jason Gobel — guitar, keyboards; Chris Kringel — bass (touring stand-in); Sean Reinert — drums, percussion, keyboards; Tony Teegarden — keyboards, vocals (touring)	none
Spring/summer 1994	Paul Masvidal — vocals, guitar, keyboards; Jason Gobel — guitar, keyboards; Sean Malone — bass, Chapman stick; Sean Reinert — drums, percussion, keyboards; Dana Cosley — keyboards, vocals (touring)	none
Band inactive fall 1994–summer 2006
September 2006–March 2007	Paul Masvidal — lead vocals, guitar, keyboards; Santiago Dobles — guitar; Chris Kringel — bass; Sean Reinert — drums, percussion, keyboards; Tony Teegarden — keyboards, vocals	none
April–June 2007	Paul Masvidal — lead vocals, guitar, keyboards; Mavis Senescu — guitar, keyboards; Chris Kringel — bass; Sean Reinert — drums, percussion, keyboards; Tony Teegarden — keyboards, vocals	none
June 2007–early 2008	Paul Masvidal — lead vocals, guitar, keyboards; Mavis Senescu — guitar, keyboards; Chris Kringel — bass; Sean Reinert — drums, percussion, keyboards	none
Early–summer 2008	Paul Masvidal — lead vocals, guitar, keyboards; Tymon Kruidenier — guitar, keyboards, vocals; Sean Malone — bass, Chapman stick (session); Sean Reinert — drums, percussion, keyboards	Traced in Air (2008)
Summer 2008–December 2010	Paul Masvidal — lead vocals, guitar, keyboards; Tymon Kruidenier — guitar, keyboards, vocals; Robin Zielhorst — bass; Sean Reinert — drums, percussion, keyboards	Re-Traced (2010)
Summer 2011	Paul Masvidal — vocals, guitar, keyboards; Sean Malone — bass, Chapman stick (session); Sean Reinert — drums, percussion, keyboards	Carbon-Based Anatomy (2011)
October 2011–early 2014	Paul Masvidal — vocals, guitar, keyboards; Max Phelps — guitar, harsh vocals (touring); Sean Malone — bass, Chapman stick (session); Brandon Giffin — bass (touring); Sean Reinert — drums, percussion, keyboards	Kindly Bent to Free Us (2014)
Summer 2014–September 2015	Paul Masvidal — vocals, guitar, keyboards; Max Phelps — guitar, harsh vocals (touring); Sean Malone — bass, Chapman stick; Sean Reinert — drums, percussion, keyboards	none
September 2015–December 2020	Paul Masvidal — vocals, guitar, keyboards; Sean Malone — bass, Chapman stick; Matt Lynch — drums, percussion	"Humanoid" (2018); "Integral" (2021)
December 2020–November 2022	Paul Masvidal — vocals, guitar, keyboards; Matt Lynch — drums, percussion	Ascension Codes (2021)
November 2022–January 2024	Paul Masvidal — vocals, guitar, keyboards; Max Phelps — guitar, harsh vocals; Brandon Giffin — bass; Matt Lynch — drums, percussion; Zeke Kaplan — keyboards	Audiotree from Nothing (2024) (does not feature Zeke Kaplan)
January 2024–May 2025	Paul Masvidal — vocals, guitar, keyboards; Mike Gilbert — guitar; Brandon Giffin — bass; Matt Lynch — drums, percussion	none
March 2024 (temporary touring lineup)	Paul Masvidal — vocals, guitar, keyboards; Mike Gilbert — guitar; Brandon Giffin — bass; Matt Lynch — drums, percussion; Steffen Kummerer — harsh vocals (touring)	none
May 2025–present	Paul Masvidal — vocals, guitar, keyboards; Mike Gilbert — guitar; Brandon Giffin — bass; Michel Bélanger — drums, percussion	none to date
