= Cortlandt (album) =

Studio album by Sean Malone
- Released: 1996
- Genres: Jazz Fusion, Progressive rock
- Length: 71:39
- Label: AudioImage
- Producer: Scott Burns

Cortlandt is a jazz fusion album by American musician Sean Malone. It was released in 1996.

== Track listing ==
=== Original release ===
1. Controversy (4:16)
2. Splinter (3:21)
3. Fisher's Gambit (5:17)
4. Hand Full of Earth (6:20)
5. Giant Steps (2:55) (John Coltrane)
6. At Taliesin (4:09)
7. Big Sky Wanting (6:00) (Sean Reinert, Trey Gunn & Sean Malone)
8. The Big Idea (6:15)
9. Sinfonia (Hidden Track) (33:06) a.k.a. Three-Part Invention in D minor
  - Contains approximately 30 minutes of silence, then Bach's Sinfonia number 4 in D minor

=== Re-release ===
1. Controversy (4:16)
2. Splinter (3:21)
3. Fisher's Gambit (5:17)
4. Hand Full of Earth (6:20)
5. Sinfonia a.k.a. Three-Part Invention in D minor (J.S.Bach)
6. Giant Steps (2:55) (John Coltrane)
7. At Taliesin (4:09)
8. Big Sky Wanting (6:00) (Sean Reinert, Trey Gunn & Sean Malone)
9. The Big Idea (6:15)
10. Unquity Road (3:42) (Pat Metheny)
  - Originally released as a bonus track on the Japanese version of the self-titled Gordian Knot album.

All songs composed by Sean Malone, except 5,6,8,10.

Artwork by Tim Spear (website)

Cortlandt was recorded in Tampa and Taos.

== Personnel ==
- Sean Malone - bass guitar (1,2,4,6,8,9,10), chapman stick (3,5,7,8,9), loops (7,9), programming (1,2,3,4,6,8)
- Trey Gunn - warr guitar (8)
- Reeves Gabrels - guitars (7)
- Bob Bunin - guitars (1,4,6,9)
- Geoff Caputo - guitars (2), vocals (9)
- Glenn Snelwar - mandolins (?)
- Sean Reinert - drums (1,2,3,4,6,10), percussion & programming (8)
- Adam Levy - guitar (10)
- Dave Wehner - vocals (9)
- John Wesley - vocals (9)
- Kathi Randall - vocals (9)
- Mike Dornberger - vocals (9)
- Rick Dill - vocals (9)
- Ricky Wilcox - vocals (9)

== Trivia ==
- "Fisher's Gambit" is reworked and renamed "Fischer's Gambit" on Gordian Knot's second album Emergent.
