= Paul Masvidal =

American musician (born 1971)

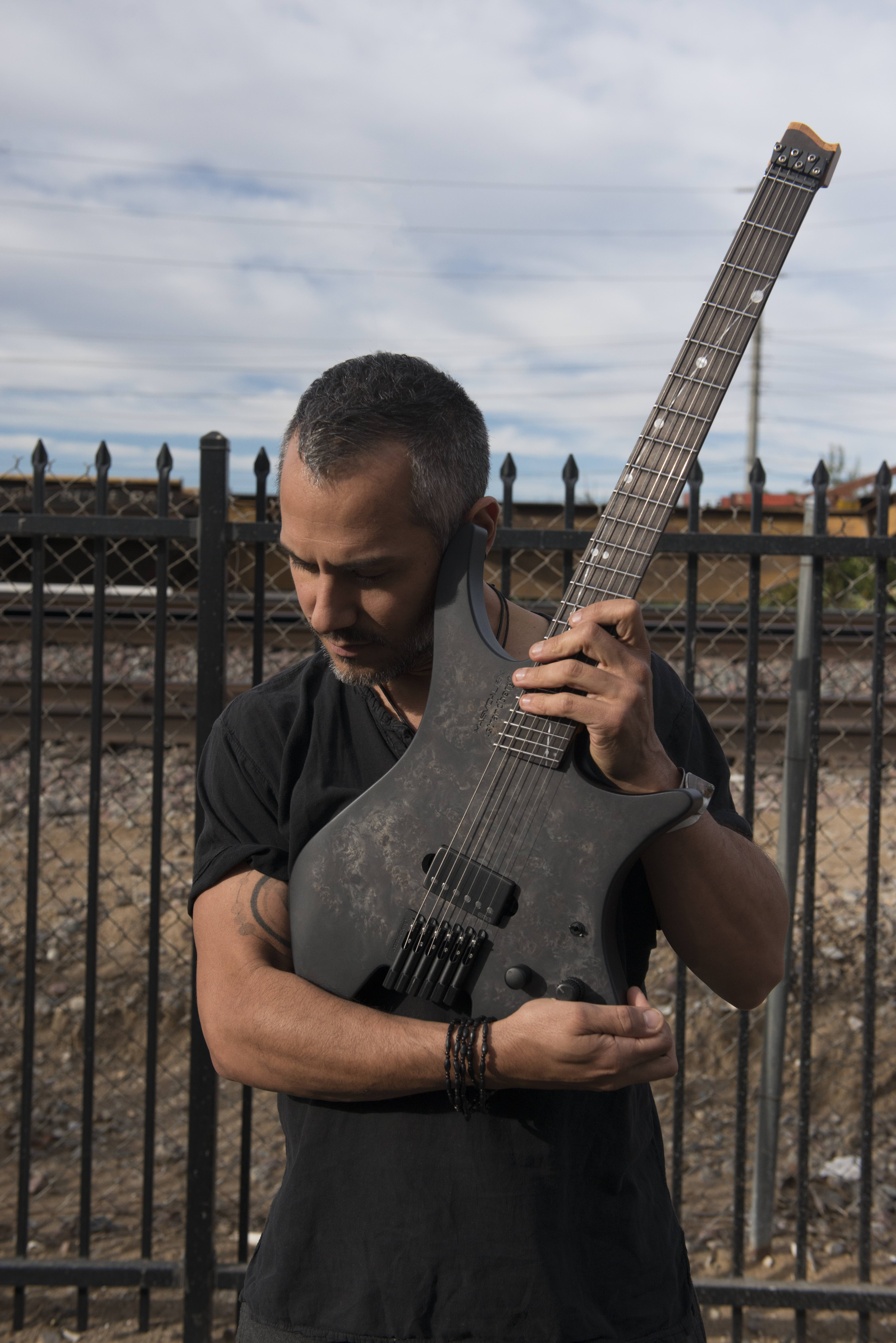
- Masvidal in 2020

Background information
- Born: Paul Albert Masvidal; January 20, 1971 (age 55); San Juan, Puerto Rico
- Origin: Miami, Florida, U.S.
- Genres: Progressive metal; extreme metal; alternative rock; ambient; new age; experimental; death metal
- Occupations: Musician; songwriter
- Instruments: Guitar; vocals
- Years active: 1987–present
- Member of: Cynic, Æon Spoke
- Formerly of: Death
- Website: masvidalien.com

Paul Albert Masvidal (born January 20, 1971) is an American musician, best known as the guitarist, singer and a founding member of the progressive metal band Cynic. He has remained a continual member in Cynic for nearly three decades and has developed numerous other projects including Æon Spoke, Onward with Love, and Masvidal (a solo project). Masvidal was ranked in Loudwire's 66 Best Hard Rock + Metal Guitarists of All Time and 50 Best Metal Songwriters of All Time.

== Early life and education ==
Paul Masvidal was born in San Juan, Puerto Rico to Cuban-American civic and business leader Raúl Masvidal.

Masvidal's early years were spent in the Miami area where he studied classical guitar with Carlos Molina, and in college, with jazz musician, Dave Weissbrot who inspired his love of jazz, Steinberger guitars, and introduced him to Buddhist philosophy. Masvidal developed an interest in mysticism and esoteric topics from a young age, becoming an initiate to Kriya Yoga in his late teens and eventually a practitioner of Buddhist meditation by his late 20s. Masvidal met drummer Sean Reinert in 1984 at Gulliver Academy in Miami, where the duo began making music the day they met, eventually forming the pre-Cynic groups, Crypha and Seaweed.

== Career ==
=== Pre-Cynic, Crypha and Seaweed (1984–1986) ===
While still at school, Masvidal had formed Crypha along with Sean Reinert. The duo later teamed up with their classmates Reid Hansen and Rod Segal to form Seaweed. The band eventually recorded a song called The Seaweed Creature, that was based upon a little doodle Reid would play on an acoustic guitar. In an interview with Hungarian heavy metal magazine Rattle Inc., Segal mentioned:

"The band was never meant to be a long term thing. It was four friends messing around... Sean and Paul had bigger ideas by then and went off to music school."

Masvidal and Reinert eventually disbanded Seaweed and went on to form Cynic.

=== Cynic (1987–1995, first hiatus) ===
Masvidal co-founded Cynic with drummer Sean Reinert around November 1987 and released four demos from 1988 to 1991 that circulated in the underground tape trading community. Masvidal developed a reputation in the South Florida music scene for his musicianship and attention began to grow quickly around the band. In 1989, while still in high school, Masvidal toured Mexico as a replacement guitarist for the band Death, but declined an invitation to permanently join the band to remain committed to Cynic. This had many journalists curious at the time, since Death were emerging as an influential and popular act, but Masvidal persevered with Cynic. However, Masvidal returned to the Death fold replacing guitarist James Murphy for tour dates on the international Spiritual Healing tour in 1990. In 1991, Masvidal and fellow Cynic member Reinert were recruited by Death to record the "groundbreaking" Human. In 2017, Rolling Stone magazine placed the album as the 70th greatest metal albums of all time. Human was Death's bestselling album, and was ranked number 82 on the October 2006 issue of Guitar World magazine's list of the greatest 100 guitar albums of all time. Masvidal toured extensively for Human, in addition to appearing in the music video for "Lack of Comprehension", which debuted on MTV's Headbangers Ball. After fulfilling their obligations with Death, both Masvidal and Reinert returned to Cynic in 1992.

In 2013, Masvidal joined forces with other original members of the Death Human line up and toured worldwide in honor of Chuck Schuldiner's legacy with the group DTA (Death to All). 1993 saw the release of the "progressive landmark" album, Focus on Roadrunner Records. Focus was listed in Rock Hard magazine's book as one of The 500 Greatest Rock & Metal Albums of All Time. Loudwire writer Graham Hartmann named Focus the ninth best debut metal album of all time. Roadrunner released a reissue of Focus in 2004 as a special collector's edition due to high demand. Cynic took a 12-year hiatus in 1995 after recording "The Portal Tapes" demos. Masvidal moved to Los Angeles in the fall of 1996, upon being offered a full scholarship at Musicians Institute, where he also began work as a session musician and composer for network TV and film.

=== Æon Spoke (1999–present) ===
During Cynic's hiatus, Masvidal founded Æon Spoke, whose ethereal indie rock was heralded as "beautiful, exquisite [and] destined for greatness" by Janice Long, BBC Radio. In 2004, the band received airplay on BBC Radio 2 and XFM for the single "Silence". The following year, the track "Emmanuel" appeared in the indie breakout film What the Bleep Do We Know!? Æon Spoke songs have also appeared on the Warner Bros. television series Smallville, One Tree Hill and the motion picture Cry Wolf. Their self-titled debut LP was released in 2007 on SPV Records.

"Masvidal creates an air of loss, longing and bereavement which is unparalleled in the field. Even in the alternative rock scene, where such voices are replete, his stands above in its emotional impact. Couple this with layered, acoustic guitars, haunting, rusty synths where needed and drumming which ties the whole thing into a neat, digestible package and you get Aeon Spoke. It's a powerful, yet oddly simple at times, side project which channels the melancholy and estrangement that had always laced Cynic's main body of work." – Karlo Doroc, Heavy Blog is Heavy

=== Cynic (reunion 2006–2014) ===
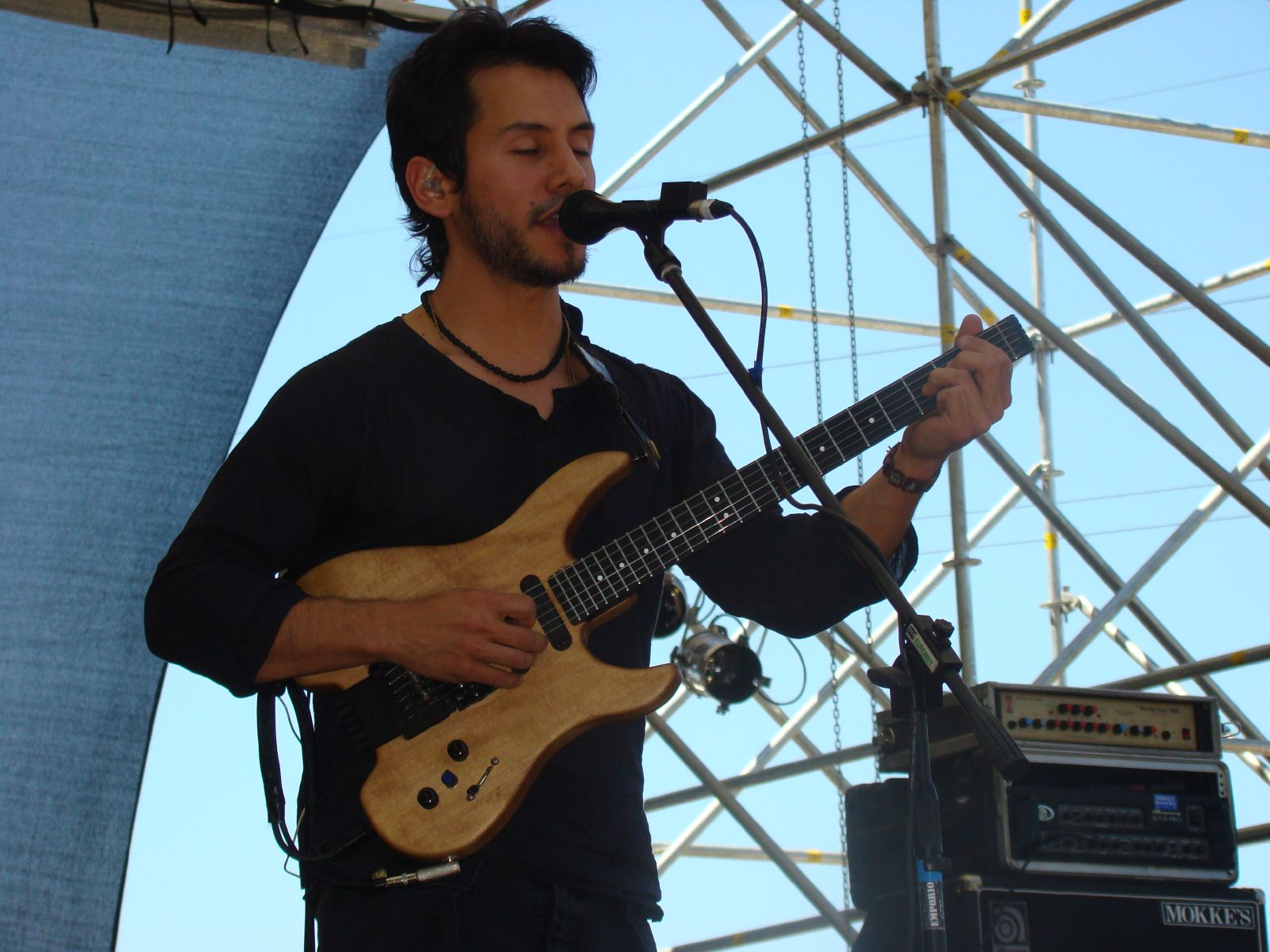
Masvidal performing in 2007

Cynic reunited in 2008 to record Traced in Air, their comeback opus. In his review, New York Times music critic Ben Ratliff wrote that Cynic "should be understood not so much alongside any metal bands but along with the radical harmonic progressives in the last 45 years of pop and jazz: composers like Milton Nascimento, the Beach Boys or Pat Metheny." Huffington Post described it as "A Modern Classic."

In 2010 and 2011 Cynic released two conceptual records: Re-Traced (2010), featuring re-interpretations of several Traced in Air tracks, and Carbon-Based Anatomy (2011). Rolling Stone music critic Hank Shteamer raved in his review of Carbon-Based Anatomy: "The title track is a perfectly paced stunner...Cynic sounds fully liberated, not just from their metal past but from any aesthetic concern other than assembling a great song." The album's opening track "Amidst The Coals" features artist, Amy Correia singing an adaptation of an Amazonian Icaro, inspired by Masvidal's work with the South American entheogenic brew, Ayahuasca.

Cynic's third full-length album, Kindly Bent to Free Us, released in 2014, was hailed by Malcome Dome of Prog magazine as "an album that transcends all the limitations of genre and era... There are few albums which can claim such a remarkable hold." The album rose to No. 4 on Billboard's Heatseekers chart in February 2014 and was No. 1 on CMJ's Loud Rock Chart the following month.

"Kindly Bent to Free Us [is] an album that, while most definitely in the realm of prog rock, has the kind of open, unpretentious air that makes Rush such an easy-to-love band." – AllMusic.com

"The alchemy of front man Paul Masvidal (vocals, guitars & keyboards) combined with rhythmaniac Sean Reinert (drums) and the technically divine Sean Malone (bass), make Cynic one of the finest Prog Rock bands to have ever of landed on Planet Earth" – burningfist.co.uk

=== Onward with Love (2015–present) ===
In 2015, Masvidal ventured into the performing-arts world with masked duo Onward with Love (OwL), a musical collaboration with acclaimed singer-songwriter Amy Correia. The pair's singular points of view make for an intriguing synthesis of Eastern-influenced philosophy, symbolist poetry, American blues, jazz and experimental rock. OwL has performed in concert venues, hospices and art galleries around greater Los Angeles. In 2015, OwL unveiled a video for the song "Kali In My Arms", which was featured in the HBO TV series and film, Looking. The duo officially released the song digitally in 2019 have plans to release a full-length record by 2021.

=== Television and film composing (1990s, 2013–2019) ===
Masvidal also writes and performs music for television and motion pictures. His credits include main title (composer credit) on an Emmy nominated NBC teen series show Operation Junkyard, short films The Yellow Umbrella, A Bride in Black, assistant to Ben Vaughn and session musician for Carsey Warner network sitcoms That '70s Show and 3rd Rock from the Sun in the 1990s. In 2013 Masvidal founded composing collective Still Motion Music which scored music for numerous TV series on H2, National Geographic, Bravo, ABC and PBS. Masvidal also has a library of songs regularly performed on network and cable television. Music writer Jeff Wagner, in his book Mean Deviation: Four Decades of Progressive Heavy Metal, stated that "any viewer of 3rd Rock from the Sun, That '70s Show, The Price Is Right, Queer as Folk, and any number of random television programs has probably stumbled across Cynic's core members without even knowing it." In 2015, Masvidal produced a children's album for actor Jim Carrey titled How Roland Rolls.

In 2016, Masvidal, along with collaborator Amy Correia, composed the musical score for the award-winning feature film The Tiger Hunter, featuring lead actor Danny Pudi. The film was released in over 60 cities nationwide, won the grand jury prize for narrative feature at the Los Angeles Asian Pacific Film Festival, and garnered effusively positive reviews from The New York Times, Los Angeles Times, and more. In 2017, Correia and Masvidal scored the main title to CW Networks, game show "Save To Win".

In 2019, the duo composed end title song for the feature film The Deported which made the official selection at the prestigious New York Latin Film Festival and the Beverly Hills Film Festival.

=== Cynic (2015–present) ===
In January 2018, Cynic released a digital single, titled "Humanoid". The song featured new drummer, Matt Lynch with longtime bassist and collaborator, Sean Malone. "Humanoid" marked the first new music from the progressive pioneers since the band's 2014 album Kindly Bent to Free Us. The artwork features a detail from the painting "Ayahuasca Dream" by Robert Venosa, Cynic's longtime collaborator and celebrated artist who died in 2011.

"Venosa and Masvidal recognized each other as fellow artists in the pursuit of authentic, spirit-based artistic expression in sound and imagery." – Martina Hoffman, painter and Venosa's wife, from the book ...And Justice for Art, Stories About Heavy Metal Album Covers by Ramon Martos

=== Masvidal (2019–present) ===
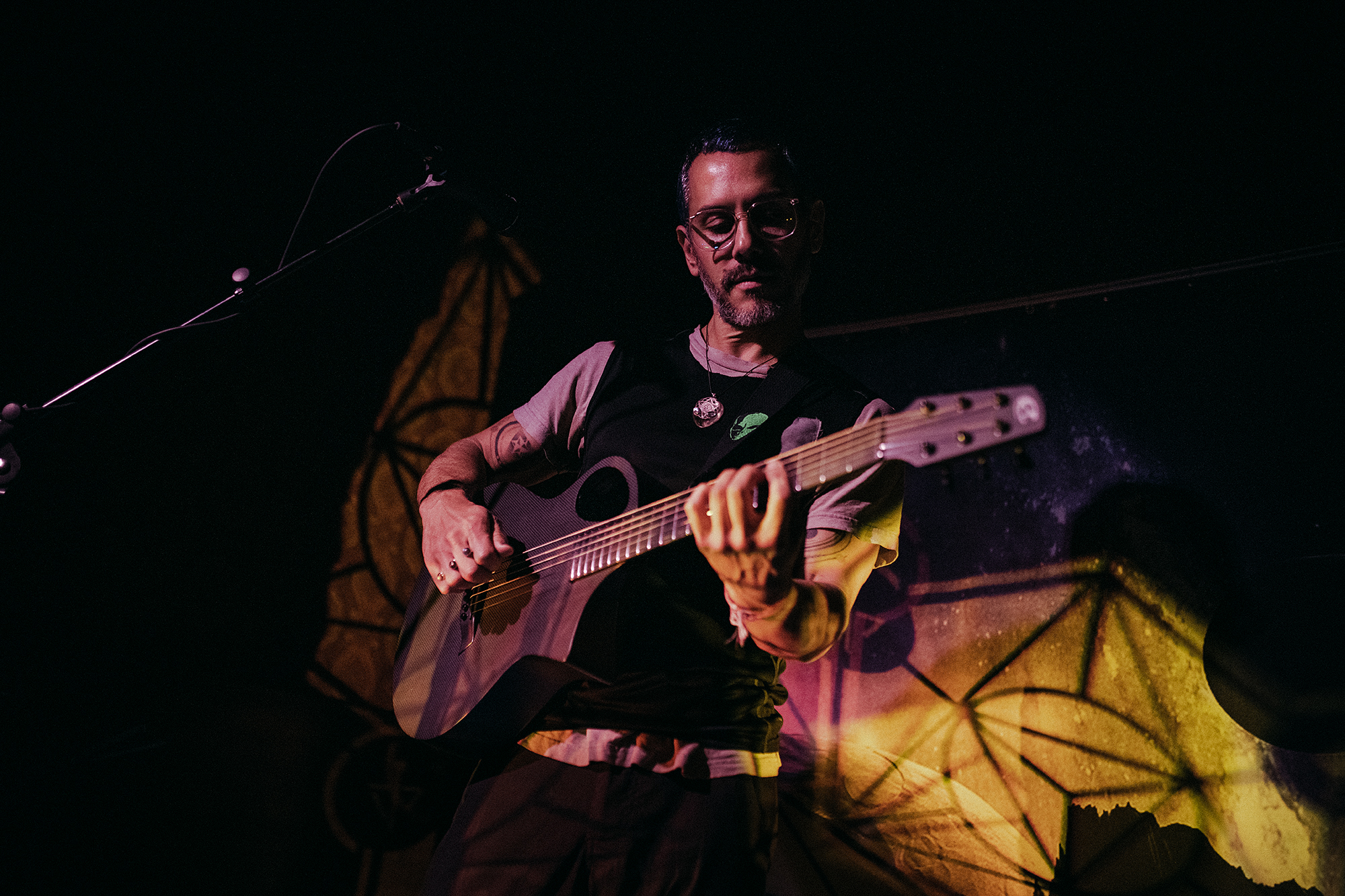
Masvidal performing

In 2019 and 2020 Masvidal ventured into releasing work as a solo artist under the name 'Masvidal' releasing three conceptual albums titled Mythical Human Vessel. The artwork for the three albums was designed by visual artists Igraine Grey and Jonatan Martinez aka Greymar.

Produced by three-time Grammy winner Warren Riker (Lauryn Hill, Fugees, Santana). Drawing on influences from musicians John Lennon, Brian Eno and Elliott Smith to visual artists – Mark Rothko, Cai Guo-Qiang, Hilma af Klint, the songs embrace concise forms and catchy melodies in spite of their often painful subject matters of loss, depression, and heartache. In Masvidal's view, "pain is not something to be feared but embraced as inevitable and, ultimately, a doorway." Billboard described the work Mythical Human Vessel, finds Masvidal at his most vulnerable, often with just a guitar and vocals, while experimenting with brain entrainment, a series of pulsing sounds that are said to lead to enhanced neural perception and memory."

Consequence of Sound premiered the launch of music video for the song "Nebula". Other press related to MHV: Human / Vessel

Ben Ratliff of the New York Times referred to Masvidal's "philosophic lyrics", stating that he is "a musician who can expand his own sense of calm into an aggressive, extravagant art".

=== Lockdown Diaries (2020–present) ===
After the death of Cynic drummer, Sean Reinert, Masvidal revived Cynic with fresh material during the ongoing COVID-19 outbreak in the United States on his social media channel.

On November 26, 2021, Cynic released a new album titled Ascension Codes. It was elected by Metal Hammer as the 3rd best progressive metal album of 2021.

== Influences ==
Masvidal's influences are quite diverse, as described in an interview with Metal-Fi.com

"I grew up playing classical guitar and listened to American folk and Cuban music as a kid growing up in Miami. Eventually I was exposed to jazz and world music which turned my world upside down in terms of harmonic and rhythmic complexity and developing a melodic language. The standards alone have always been a huge part of my interest in writing deceptively complex songs and of course Bach, as a composer is probably still my biggest influence. My older brother turned me on to classic rock bands like Led Zeppelin, Sabbath and Pink Floyd, which eventually led to me exploring heavier stuff like Metallica and Slayer. The Beatles have always been big for me, especially the later records. Certain guitarists like Pat Metheny and Ben Monder opened up new vistas and even classic jazz guys like Charlie Christian and Wes Montgomery blow my mind every time I listen to them. For me, inspiration is everywhere and always a reflection of where I'm at as an artist..."

In another interview with TheGearPage.net, Masvidal spoke about his influences from classical music, jazz, ambient and experimental music:

"I've always been greatly inspired by composers like Bach, Ravel and Jazz pianists, Keith Jarrett and Bill Evans, and Glen Gould who's [sic] Bach Goldberg Variations are some of my all time favorite things to listen to. There's also horn players like Charlie Parker, Coltrane, and Eric Dolphy. Pablo Casals, Cello Suites is one of my great joys, Brian Eno's ambient music speaks to me on multiple levels, and Ravi Shankar's records especially his experimental electronic records ...the list could go on!"

In the same interview with TheGearPage.net, Masvidal spoke about his inspirations for playing the guitars:

"My earliest (guitar) inspirations were Andres Segovia, John Williams, Django Reinhardt. Jimmy Page, Alex Lifeson and much of early Rush's catalog, Andy Summers with the Police and their early records, Steve Howe, Randy Rhoads, Eddie Van Halen, and Steve Lukather. Then came players Alan Holdsworth, John Mclaughlin with Mahavishnu Orchestra. Some of John's solo records like 'My Goals Beyond' were huge for me, Robert Fripp and The League of Crafty Guitarists, King Crimson's Discipline record is one of my all time faves... Jason Becker' s Perpetual Burn, TJ Helmerich, Steve Vai, Warren Cuccurullo (Missing Persons, Duran Duran), Eric Johnson, Scott Henderson (Tribal Tech), Guthrie Govan, Kevin Shields (My Bloody Valentine)..."

== Personal life ==
As an inventor, Masvidal filed a successful patent (Vidatak EZ Board US Patent No. 6,422,875) in 1999 (which was approved in 2002), involving a device to assist voice-disabled individuals.

In May 2014, the Los Angeles Times did a front cover story on Masvidal's coming out as a homosexual along with fellow Cynic member Sean Reinert. For gay pride month June 2017, Masvidal talked to Billboard about his experiences as a gay man in the rock and metal community:

"We were always outsiders as a metal band, not only sonically with our influences coming at it from a totally different direction, but we never wore the masculine badge as being tough guys or any of that. We oftentimes wore very colorful clothes, so we were just a little more eccentric and kind of outside the box..."

In an interview for Tricycle magazine, Masvidal elaborated on the origins of Cynic's name, Buddhism and his creative process.

Masvidal has been a vegetarian since 1989.

Masvidal began work with his brother, Maheshananda, an established and influential teacher of Yoga and Ayurveda in 2018, offering Ayurvedic and CBD-based products with company More Life Market.

Masvidal has most recently entered into the creation of physical objects, developing Orgonite related devices and sacred geometric amulets. His interest in cosmology, consciousness, extra-terrestrials, UFOs, crop circles and their connection to his spiritual interests have become integral to his work as an artist.

== Gear ==
Masvidal has owned and used many different types of guitars, amplifiers, amp modellers and effects over his career. He has also frequently modified his guitars, usually changing the pickups and adding additional electronics.

During his early career, Masvidal was closely associated with Steinberger guitars. One model, a hand-painted swirl finish GM4T, was used by him in his early session work with metal bands, as well as during his time in Death and the early period of Cynic. He used a black GM4T and a ZT3 while touring in support of Cynic's 2008 album Traced in Air.

Masvidal used a Gibson SG and a Martin acoustic with Æon Spoke, radically departing from the headless Steinberger instruments people had associated with him in the past.

In 2013, Masvidal began playing Strandberg Guitars. He lent his name to a line of signature Masvidalien instruments. These guitars were based on Strandberg's Boden and Varberg shapes, with various customisations to Masvidal's requests.

Masvidal switched to playing and endorsing Kiesel Guitars in 2024. He exclusively plays models from Kiesel's line of headless guitars, including the Lightspeed electric guitar and the Zeus acoustic guitar. Strandberg Guitars founder Ola Strandberg wished him well on his new endorsement.

Masvidal has also used the Composite Acoustics Cargo, typically for his solo work.

Masvidal talked in detail about his gear in an interview with online publication Gear Gods.

Guitars

- Carvin CL450
- Casio MG-500
- Steinberger GR4R (customized with a Bare Knuckle Pickups Miracle Man pickup in the bridge position, two Bare Knuckle Pickups Trilogy Suite single coils in the middle and neck position and an internal Roland midi pickup.)
- Steinberger GM4T
- Steinberger ZT3
- Strandberg Masvidal BodenOS (customized with Dunable Direwolf pickups)
- Strandberg Masvidalien Cosmo headless 6-string guitar
- Strandberg Masvidalien headless 6-string guitar
- Gibson SG
- Gibson V2
- Kiesel Lightspeed
- Kiesel Zeus
- Martin 000-C16GT
- Martin D-28
- Composite Acoustics Cargo

Effects

- Meris effects pedals
- Pro Tone Paul Masvidal Signature Chorus
- Roland GM-70 Guitar synthesizer
- Yamaha TX81Z
- Rocktron Intellifex

Amplification

- Fractal Audio Axe FX Ultra
- Fractal Audio Axe FX II
- Neural DSP Archetype plugins
- Positive Grid Bias FX
- ADA MP-1 preamp with ADA midi controller
- Digitech and Rane equalizers

== Discography ==
=== Æon Spoke ===
- Above the Buried Cry (2004)
- Æon Spoke (2007)

=== Cynic ===
- Focus (1993)
- Traced in Air (2008)
- Re-Traced (2010)
- Carbon-Based Anatomy (2011)
- The Portal Tapes (2012)
- Kindly Bent to Free Us (2014)
- Uroboric Forms – The Complete Demo Recordings (2017)
- Humanoid (Single) (2018)
- Traced in Air Remixed (2019)
- Ascension Codes (2021)

=== Death ===
- Human (1991)

=== Portal ===
- The Portal Tapes (2012) - original demo tape recorded 1995/1996

=== Solo ===
- Mythical (2019)
- Human (2019)
- Vessel (2020)

=== Guest / session ===
- Master – On The Seventh Day God Created... Master (1991) (guitars)
- Terri Nunn (Berlin) (1997) – co-wrote songs for an unreleased solo album
- Gordian Knot − Emergent (2003)
- Amy Correia – Lakeville (2004) (guitar & keyboards on "Stranded", electric piano on "Beautifull/Ugly", "Love is")
- Exivious – Exivious (2009) (guitar solo on "Embrace The Unknown")
- Devin Townsend Project – Deconstruction (2010) (vocals on "Sumeria")
- Aaron Freeman – Marvelous Clouds (2012) (Acoustic guitar)
- Chris Schlarb – Psychic Temple II (2013) (Acoustic Guitar on "Solo in Place", Electric Guitar on "No Tsurai")
- Persefone – AATHMA (2017) (vocals on Living Waves)
- Neil Grant – Location Persuader (2017) (Guitars & vocals on "Throw me out there!")
- Contrarian (band) – To Perceive Is to Suffer (2017) (vocals on "At Fate's Hands")
- Dr. Stephane Pigeon (2019) – Mythical Human Vessel's Isochronic Tones, Transdimensional Traveler 'myNoise' player
- BRVMAK – In Nomine Patris (2019) (vocals on "Omnipotence")
- Moon Destroys – Maiden Voyage (2020) (vocals on "Stormbringer")
