= Masvidal =

Masvidal is a surname of Catalan origin. Notable people with the surname include:

- Paul Masvidal (born 1971), American guitarist, songwriter, and producer
- Jorge Masvidal (born 1984), American mixed martial artist
