= Focus (Cynic album) =

Studio album by Cynic
- Released: September 14, 1993
- Recorded: 1993
- Studio: Morrisound Recording
- Genres: Progressive metal; technical death metal; avant-garde metal; jazz fusion
- Length: 35:57
- Label: Roadrunner
- Producers: Scott Burns, Cynic

Cynic chronology
Focus (1993)	Traced in Air (2008)

Focus is the debut studio album by American metal band Cynic, released September 14, 1993, through Roadrunner Records. A remastered version of the album was released in 2004.

== Background and release ==
The album was recorded at Morrisound Recording in Tampa, Florida and was produced by Scott Burns.

For the album's cover art, Masvidal chose the 1974 painting "Angelic Manifestation" by surrealist artist Robert Venosa. He traveled to meet Venosa in person and later recalled, “I encountered someone who was incredibly kind and humble. He immediately put me at ease. We spoke for hours and explored what the music meant to say in terms of a visual context. He helped me to understand the relationship between the visual and auditory medium’s and how they would become one and the same if all was aligned.” He also chose a Venosa painting for the band's follow-up album Traced in Air.

In 2004 Roadrunner Records released a remastered version of Focus, which contained the original eight tracks and six bonus tracks. Three of these were remixes by John Hiler, while the three other songs are taken from the members' post-Cynic project Portal's eponymous demo. Portal featured almost the same lineup as Cynic. Sean Malone was replaced by Chris Kringel and a fifth member, Aruna Abrams, joined on vocals and keyboards. All Cynic songs were written by Cynic; all Portal songs were written by Portal. The remixed tracks feature the same lineup as the original release.

On August 1, 2022, it was announced that Masvidal and Warren Riker had completed a remix and remaster of Focus, which was released the following year on June 9, 2023, to celebrate the album's 30th anniversary.

== Composition ==
=== Instrumentation ===
Focus takes an experimental approach to death metal, combining the genre with other influences, namely jazz fusion.

The guitar parts of Masvidal and Jason Gobel intertwine, which Masvidal compared to guitar duos such as Television's Tom Verlaine and Richard Lloyd, or Robert Fripp and Adrian Belew from King Crimson.

Masvidal and Gobel use very similar gear throughout the record. Both play a Steinberger brand electric guitar equipped with a Roland MIDI pickup and Yamaha TX81Z guitar synth, and both used ADA amplification. Most of the synthesized sounds on the album are generated with these guitar synthesizers, not keyboards (the sole exception being the outro to How Could I). The Steinberger guitars also feature a tremolo system which bends each string an equal amount, allowing the bending of full chord shapes in tune. A demonstration of this is heard in the very first guitar chord of "I'm But a Wave to...".

Sean Malone plays a Kubicki fretless bass nearly throughout the album. The fretless bass has a soft attack and a round, warm sound rather atypical to heavy metal, which usually prefers the punchier attack of fretted bass. On some parts on Focus Malone plays a 12-string Chapman Stick instead.

Sean Reinert's drum style meshes together elements from both heavy metal and jazz. He uses accents, fills and varied dynamics to keep the songs rhythmically vivid. He occasionally plays a 16th-note double bass drum beat to emphasize certain parts of songs, but does not play blast beat on the album. However; a "skank" beat is played near the end of Uroboric Forms. In addition to an acoustic drum kit, he also uses electronic drums on some songs.

=== Vocals and lyrics ===
The album features a hoarse, guttural, growling vocal style, provided by keyboardist Tony Teegarden. Lead singer Paul Masvidal said he was in danger of losing his voice at the time and thus did not perform the harsh vocals himself. As a result, Masvidal recorded his own vocals using a vocoder, giving his voice a synthesized, robotic quality.

The lyrics, written by Masvidal, are poetic, philosophically and spiritually laden texts that take on subjects such as perceiving the world as whole, distinguishing reality and illusion, concentration and meditation. Many of the songs incorporate themes, titles or excerpts from other works: "Veil of Maya" takes its title from a George William Russell poem of the same name, while "Sentiment" quotes a prayer from Whispers from Eternity by Paramahansa Yogananda. Many influences from oriental mysticism and religions as well as some New Age themes are present. The whole lyrical perspective is positive, humane and humble, all rather atypical qualities within the realm of death metal.

== Reception ==
Professional ratings
Review scores
Source	Rating
AllMusic	link
Collector's Guide to Heavy Metal	6/10
Kerrang!	3/5 stars
Metal.de	10/10
Metal Rules	5/5
Metal Storm	9.7/10 link
Rock Hard	9/10

Although Cynic were associated with the Florida death metal scene, Focus represented a significant departure musically from Death's Human and the early Cynic demo-tapes. It was therefore a hard album to market. Cynic found themselves touring to promote the album with brutal death metal band Cannibal Corpse and predictably received a mixed reception from their fans. When asked in an interview about the success of the 2007 reunion tour, Masvidal said "it was just really disorienting to hear a sea of 10,000 people singing ‘Veil of Maya’." He recalled a bottle getting thrown at his head the last time they played the song, while they were touring with Cannibal Corpse in Texas. This negative reaction from within the metal scene was part of the reason Cynic broke up in 1994.

Loudwire writer Graham Hartmann named Focus the ninth best debut metal album, and in 2024 the website elected it as one of the 11 best progressive metal debut albums. In 2005 the album was placed number 496 in Rock Hard magazine's book The 500 Greatest Rock & Metal Albums of All Time.

In the 2004 Focus reissue liner notes, Ula Gehret, a music journalist, owner of Clandestine Music, and Century Media Europe manager, wrote that there were no tracks where a main influence or point of plagiarism could be found. They found this unique for debut albums, and only pointed out Black Sabbath and Frank Zappa as groundbreaking bands where the same could be said for originality.

In the foreword from the Focus bass transcription book, Jeff Wagner, the author of Mean Deviation: Four Decades of Progressive Heavy Metal and co-host of the podcast Radical Research – Adventures in Exceptional Musick, wrote "Despite it feeling completely of its time in 1993, if you listen to Focus now, it’s difficult to tell which era it was recorded in. It has no hallmarks of any particular time, drawing, as it does, from things going all the way back to jazz’s ‘60s renaissance, while feeling like music being beamed to Earth by some distant future race. At whatever present point you’re in, it holds up there too."

In 2009, Chris Dick of Decibel Magazine called Focus "the most significant progressive death metal (by association) record of all time" and inducted it into their Hall of Fame.

On the 20th anniversary of the album in 2013, the BazillionPoints.com blog presented an extract of Jeff Wagner's book Mean Deviation: Four Decades of Progressive Metal which said Focus "aged extremely well" and stood alongside albums such as ...And Justice For All, Human, and Images and Words.

In 2019, Focus was featured in Issue #173 of OffYourRadar.com, where Darryl Wright referred to it as "unlike anything you've ever heard" with "complex arrangements usually reserved for snooty experimental jazz clubs" They also noted that many later bands would incorporate its elements. Jeremy Shatan wrote "There is so much that could go wrong on this Cynic album that its artistic success is a thrilling high-wire act". He compared Sean Malone's jazz fusion bass to Jamaaladeen Tacuma’s work for Ornette Coleman; and the robotic vocals to the “Lord’s Prayer” section of Pink Floyd’s “Sheep.” He also noted the melodic sections of layered guitars and synthesizers which created "a sense of yearning."

On September 14, 2023, Focus celebrated its 30th anniversary. In anticipation, blogger Into the Wells praised its experimental stance and its fusion of death metal with genres such as jazz.

In 2025, it was ranked by Loudwire as the 8th best progressive metal album of the 1990s.

=== Influence on other artists ===
Atheist had previously fused death metal with jazz. Cynic itself has had a notable influence on some later bands. Echoes of Cynic's approach can be heard in the music of many later death metal bands such as Martyr, Aletheian, Decrepit Birth, Behold... the Arctopus, as well as some progressive metal bands such as Meshuggah, Spiral Architect, Sceptic, Between the Buried and Me and Continuo Renacer.

Deathcore/metalcore band Veil of Maya and progressive metal band Textures were each named after a track from this album. Focus has been cited as an influence by The Dillinger Escape Plan, Scale the Summit, Obscura and Scott Carstairs of Fallujah.

In 2023, on the eve of the 30th anniversary of the album, Sandre the Giant from the Killchain blogzine wrote that "Some of metal’s most forward thinking and progressive bands over the last 30 years owe their existence to Cynic", such as Meshuggah, Dillinger Escape Plan, Decrepit Birth, and Mastodon.

== Track listing ==
All tracks are written by Paul Masvidal, Jason Gobel, Sean Malone and Sean Reinert, except where noted.

No.	Title	Length
1.	"Veil of Maya"	5:23
2.	"Celestial Voyage"	3:40
3.	"The Eagle Nature"	3:30
4.	"Sentiment"	4:23
5.	"I'm But a Wave to..."	5:30
6.	"Uroboric Forms"	3:32
7.	"Textures" (instrumental)	4:42
8.	"How Could I"	5:29
Total length:		35:57

2004 re-mastered bonus tracks
No.	Title	Writer(s)	Length
9.	"Veil of Maya (2004 Remix)"		5:22
10.	"I'm But a Wave to... (2004 Remix)"		5:21
11.	"How Could I (2004 Remix)"		6:20
12.	"Cosmos"	Masvidal, Gobel, Reinert, Aruna Abrams, Chris Kringel	4:21
13.	"The Circle's Gone"	Masvidal, Gobel, Reinert, Abrams, Kringel	5:20
14.	"Endless Endeavors"	Masvidal, Gobel, Reinert, Abrams, Kringel	9:56

== Personnel ==
Focus album personnel adapted from the CD liner notes of the 2004 remaster.

Cynic

- Paul Masvidal – vocals, guitar, guitar synth
- Jason Gobel – guitar, guitar synth
- Sean Malone – bass, Chapman Stick
- Sean Reinert – drums, keyboards
- Tony Teegarden - death growls

Additional personnel

- Sonia Otey – additional vocals
- Steve Gruden – additional vocals
- Aruna Abrams – keyboards, vocals (tracks 12–14; 2004 remaster)
- Chris Kringel – bass (tracks 12–14; 2004 remaster)

Technical personnel

- Cynic – production
- Scott Burns – production, engineering, mixing
- Robert Venosa – artwork

Technical personnel (2004 remaster)

- Tom Burleigh – production
- Paul Masvidal – production
- Sean Reinert – production
- Kevin Bartley – mastering (tracks 1–8)
- Mark Chalecki – mastering (tracks 9–14)
- John Hiler – remixing (tracks 9–11)
- Portal – production (tracks 12–14)
- Scott Burns – production, mixing (tracks 12–14)
