= Carbon-Based Anatomy =

EP by Cynic
- Released: November 11, 2011
- Recorded: 2011
- Genre: Progressive rock; jazz fusion; alternative metal
- Length: 23:01
- Label: Season of Mist
- Producer: Paul Masvidal, Sean Reinert

Cynic chronology
| Re-Traced (2010) | Carbon-Based Anatomy (2011) | Kindly Bent to Free Us (2014) |

Professional ratings
Review scores
| Source | Rating |
|---|---|
| Allmusic | 3/5 stars |
| Metal Injection | 8.5/10 stars |
| MetalSucks | 4/5 stars |
| PowerLine | 4/5 stars |

Carbon-Based Anatomy is an EP by the progressive rock/metal band Cynic. It was released through Season of Mist on November 11, 2011.

== History ==
Carbon-Based Anatomy EP is composed of six previously unheard tracks. However, the song "Carbon-Based Anatomy" is a reinterpretation of an older unreleased Æon Spoke single, "Homosapien". This was also done on Cynic's LP, Traced in Air, as the track "Integral Birth" was an interpretation of Æon Spoke's "When Sunrise Skirts the Moor." The artwork was done by Robert Venosa, the artist who was responsible for all previous Cynic artworks. Venosa died shortly before the release of Carbon-Based Anatomy.

Three of six tracks are short, ambient-oriented pieces ("Amidst the Coals", "Bija!", and "Hieroglyph"), and represent an unprecedented musical direction for Cynic. Since the two previous hired musicians, Tymon Kruidenier and Robin Zielhorst, were let go by Masvidal and Reinert, all guitar parts for this EP were recorded by Paul Masvidal. Bass parts were composed and recorded by Sean Malone, who had recorded on every Cynic release until his passing in 2020, with the exception of 2010's Re-Traced.

== Track listing ==
| No. | Title | Length |
|---|---|---|
| 1. | "Amidst the Coals" | 2:11 |
| 2. | "Carbon-Based Anatomy" | 6:24 |
| 3. | "Bija!" | 2:27 |
| 4. | "Box Up My Bones" | 5:32 |
| 5. | "Elves Beam Out" | 3:59 |
| 6. | "Hieroglyph" | 2:28 |
| Total length: | | 23:01 |

== Personnel ==
Cynic

- Paul Masvidal – vocals, guitar, guitar synth
- Sean Reinert – drums, keyboards
- Sean Malone – fretless bass

Guest Musicians

- Amy Correia – female vocals

Production

- John Hiler – mixing, engineering
- Josh Newell - engineering
- Maor Appelbaum – mastering engineer
- Eric Greif – legal
- Robert Venosa – artwork
