= Æon Spoke (album) =

Studio album by Æon Spoke
- Released: April 2007
- Genre: Alternative rock, post-rock
- Length: 45:01
- Label: SPV GmbH

Æon Spoke chronology
| Above the Buried Cry (2004) | Æon Spoke (2007) |

Professional ratings
Review scores
| Source | Rating |
|---|---|
| MusicOMH | 3/5 stars |

Æon Spoke is the second studio album by American band Æon Spoke, led by Paul Masvidal and Sean Reinert.

== Track listing ==
All tracks are written by Æon Spoke.

| No. | Title | Length |
|---|---|---|
| 1. | "Cavalry of Woe" | 4:14 |
| 2. | "No Answers" | 3:37 |
| 3. | "Sand and Foam" | 3:19 |
| 4. | "Nothing" | 5:22 |
| 5. | "The Fisher Tale" | 5:24 |
| 6. | "Emmanuel" | 4:31 |
| 7. | "Grace" | 4:58 |
| 8. | "Pablo (At the Park)" | 5:10 |
| 9. | "Yellowman" | 3:45 |
| 10. | "Silence" | 4:41 |
| Total length: | | 45:01 |

== Personnel ==
- Paul Masvidal – vocals, guitar
- Sean Reinert – drums, percussion, keyboards & backing vocals
- Evo – guitar

Guest musicians:

- Chris Tristram – bass
- R. Walt Vincent – bass, background vocals, keys
- Evan Slamka – background vocals
- Paul Hepker – keys
