= Kindly Bent to Free Us =

Studio album by Cynic
- Released: February 18, 2014
- Recorded: December 2012 – May 2013
- Studio: Perfect Sound Studio in Los Angeles
- Genre: Progressive rock; progressive metal
- Length: 41:51
- Label: Season of Mist
- Producer: Paul Masvidal, Sean Reinert, Sean Malone

Cynic chronology
Carbon-Based Anatomy (2011)	Kindly Bent to Free Us (2014)	Ascension Codes (2021)

Singles from Kindly Bent to Free Us
- 1. "Kindly Bent to Free Us" Released: December 13, 2013

Professional ratings
Aggregate scores
Source	Rating
Metacritic	66/100
Review scores
Source	Rating
AllMusic	4/5 stars
Exclaim!	8/10
MetalSucks	4/5 stars
Loudwire	4/5 stars
Pitchfork Media	4/10
Popmatters	7/10 discs
Revolver	4/5 stars
Sputnikmusic	2.5/5

Kindly Bent to Free Us is the third studio album by the progressive metal band Cynic. It was released on February 18, 2014, and is the final Cynic album with Sean Reinert, who left the band in September 2015 and died on January 24, 2020, as well as the final Cynic album with Sean Malone, who died on December 9, 2020.

== History ==
The album was talked about in more detail during the writings sessions in February 2012. Masvidal told the Irish magazine Molten:

It's almost like, I don't know how to explain it, but if I had to put it in a box it's more sci-fi, futuristic and alien but at the same time very song-driven. It's kind of like, to me, coming into CYNIC's body more. It feels very modern and at the same time it just feels really cool. I'm big in the space. It's definitely new. It's not like anything we've done before. It's a new color, a new space. I think people will really take note of even the guitar stuff. I'm really shifting gears, I'm trying things in a different way and the way stuff is played. It's a new space for CYNIC, for sure. It definitely sounds like us, except completely new.

— Paul Masvidal

"It's a bold new sound for Cynic and marks a gigantic leap in the band's progression. We've had a lot of time to let this material develop and gestate, and it finally feels ready to be unleashed on the world. I've been in trio mode with Malone and Masvidal flushing out a zillion and one details, and couldn't be happier about what's happening with these songs. They are truly alive!"

— Sean Reinert

The album was made available for streaming on February 6, 2014.

== Track listing ==
All music written by Cynic (Paul Masvidal, Sean Reinert, and Sean Malone)

No.	Title	Length
1.	"True Hallucination Speak"	6:03
2.	"The Lion's Roar"	4:34
3.	"Kindly Bent to Free Us"	6:27
4.	"Infinite Shapes"	4:57
5.	"Moon Heart Sun Head"	5:21
6.	"Gitanjali"	3:58
7.	"Holy Fallout"	6:35
8.	"Endlessly Bountiful"	3:56
Total length:		41:51

Deluxe CD book exclusive bonus track
No.	Title	Length
9.	"Earth Is My Witness"	4:32
Total length:		46:23

== Personnel ==
=== Musicians ===
- Paul Masvidal – vocals, guitars, keyboards
- Sean Malone – fretless bass, Chapman stick
- Sean Reinert – drums

=== Technical staff ===
- Jason Donaghy – engineering
- R. Walt Vincent – mixing
- Maor Appelbaum – mastering
- Robert Venosa – artwork
