= Sean Reinert =

American drummer (1971–2020)

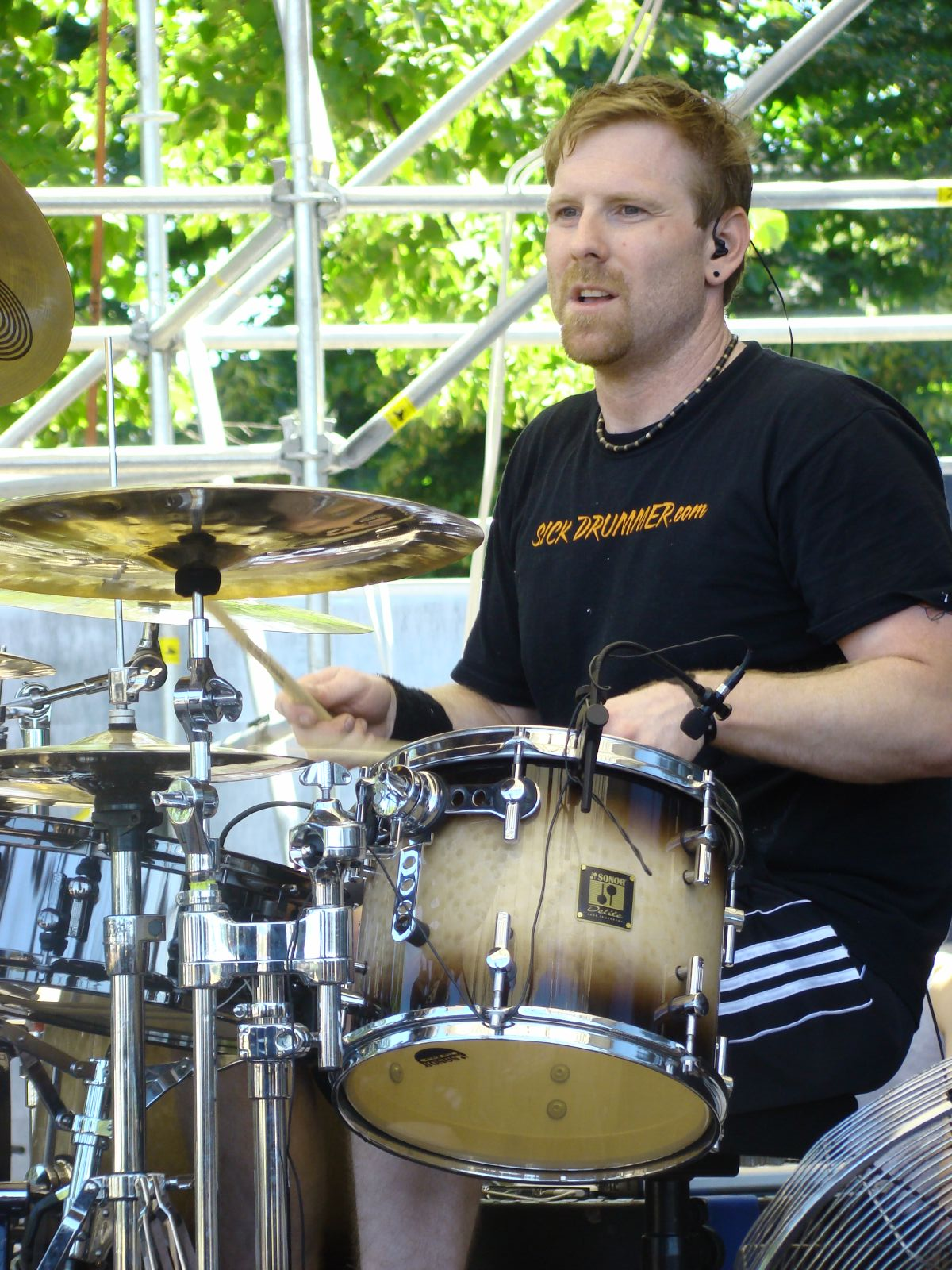
- Reinert in 2007

Background information
- Born: Sean Landon Reinert; May 27, 1971; Florida, U.S.
- Died: January 24, 2020 (aged 48)
- Cause of death: Aortic rupture
- Genres: Progressive metal; technical death metal; jazz fusion
- Occupation: Drummer
- Instrument: Drums
- Years active: 1987–2020
- Labels: Roadrunner; Season of Mist
- Formerly of: Cynic, Æon Spoke, Death, Gordian Knot, Aghora, Perfect Beings
- Spouse: Thomas Snyder
- Website: seanreinert.com

Sean Landon Reinert (May 27, 1971 – January 24, 2020) was an American musician. He was the drummer for the rock band Æon Spoke, the drummer for Death metal band Death and the drummer and cofounder of the progressive metal band Cynic along with Paul Masvidal until leaving the band in September 2015. He was also a member of projects such as Gordian Knot, Aghora, and Perfect Beings.

== Early life and education ==
Sean Reinert was born on May 27, 1971, in Florida. In his early years, he studied piano and French horn before switching to drums. In 1984, he met guitarist Paul Masvidal at Gulliver Academy in Miami, with whom he formed early school bands such as Crypha and Seaweed.

At age fifteen, he enrolled at the New World School of the Arts, where he studied piano, sight-singing, ear training, and music theory. He subsequently attended Miami-Dade Community College and earned a bachelor's degree in Music Composition and Theory from the Frost School of Music at the University of Miami, where he studied under percussionist Harry Hawthorne. He later studied orchestration with Steven Scott Smalley in Los Angeles.

== Career ==
=== Cynic and initial breakup (1987–1994) ===
Cynic was founded in November 1987 by Reinert and Masvidal. Between 1988 and 1991, they recorded four demo tapes: '88 Demo (1988), Reflections of a Dying World (1989), '90 Demo (1990), and Demo 1991 (1991). This material was later released in 2017 on the compilation album Uroboric Forms: The Complete Demo Recordings.

In 1991, Chuck Schuldiner recruited Reinert and Masvidal to join Death for their fourth studio album. Reinert took part in recording sessions at Morrisound Recording in Tampa, Florida, alongside bassist Steve Di Giorgio and producer Scott Burns. The album, titled Human, was released in October 1991. Reinert participated in the subsequent European tour between late 1991 and early 1992. During this tour, financial disputes led to a promoter withholding the band's equipment in the United Kingdom for six months. Following the tour's conclusion, Reinert and Masvidal decided to leave Death to focus exclusively on Cynic.

After signing with Roadrunner Records, Cynic consisted of Reinert, Masvidal, guitarist Jason Gobel, bassist Sean Malone, and vocalist Tony Teegarden. The recording of their debut album was delayed due to the destruction caused by Hurricane Andrew in August 1992, which destroyed their rehearsal space and Gobel's home. The album, Focus, was released on September 14, 1993. The band disbanded in the fall of 1994 following a performance at the Dynamo Open Air festival.

=== Side projects (1995–2006) ===
Following the dissolution of Cynic, Reinert, Masvidal, and Gobel formed the band Portal with Aruna Abrams, recording a demo in 1995 (released in 2012 as The Portal Tapes under the Cynic name). Reinert relocated to California, where he worked as a session musician and composed for television shows and films.

In 1996, he performed on Sean Malone's solo album, Cortlandt. Between 1999 and 2003, he was a member of the instrumental project Gordian Knot alongside Malone, playing on the albums Gordian Knot (1999) and Emergent (2003). He also played on progressive metal band Aghora's self-titled debut album (1999) and their subsequent release Formless (2006). In 1999, he and Masvidal founded the alternative rock band Æon Spoke, releasing two albums: Above the Buried Cry (2005) and Æon Spoke (2007).

=== Return to Cynic and legal dispute (2006–2020) ===
In 2006, Cynic reunited and embarked on a European tour in 2007. In November 2008, they released the album Traced in Air, followed by the EPs Re-Traced (2010) and Carbon-Based Anatomy (2011), and the full-length album Kindly Bent to Free Us (2014).

In September 2015, Reinert announced the breakup of Cynic due to artistic and personal differences, leading to a legal dispute with Masvidal over the rights to the band's name. In December 2017, both parties reached a settlement in which Reinert gave full control of the band's name to Masvidal and confirmed his definitive departure. He subsequently joined the progressive rock band Perfect Beings.

== Personal life and death ==
In May 2014, in an interview with the Los Angeles Times, Reinert and Paul Masvidal publicly came out as gay. Reinert was married to Thomas Snyder.

On January 24, 2020, Reinert was found unresponsive by Snyder at their home in San Bernardino, California. After resuscitation attempts, he was transported to a local hospital, where he was pronounced dead at the age of 48. His cause of death was an aortic rupture. His wish to be an organ donor was denied under regulations of the FDA and the U.S. Department of Health and Human Services in effect at the time, which restricted donations from sexually active gay men within the previous year.

== Legacy and influences ==
Reinert cited John Bonham, Neil Peart, Alex Van Halen, Terry Bozzio, and Dave Weckl as his primary influences.

Numerous musicians have cited Reinert as an influence, including Peter Wildoer of Darkane, Brann Dailor of Mastodon, Gene Hoglan, Richard Christy, Dirk Verbeuren of Soilwork and Megadeth, Chris Pennie of The Dillinger Escape Plan and Coheed and Cambria, George Kollias of Nile, Kai Hahto of Nightwish, John Merryman of Cephalic Carnage, Daniel Moilanen of Katatonia, Elliot Hoffman of Car Bomb, Evan Sammons of Last Chance to Reason, and Mario Duplantier of Gojira.

Additionally, other artists have expressed admiration for his playing, including Mike Portnoy, Hannes Grossmann, Dan Presland of Ne Obliviscaris, Danny Walker of Intronaut, and Paul Mazurkiewicz of Cannibal Corpse.

== Discography ==
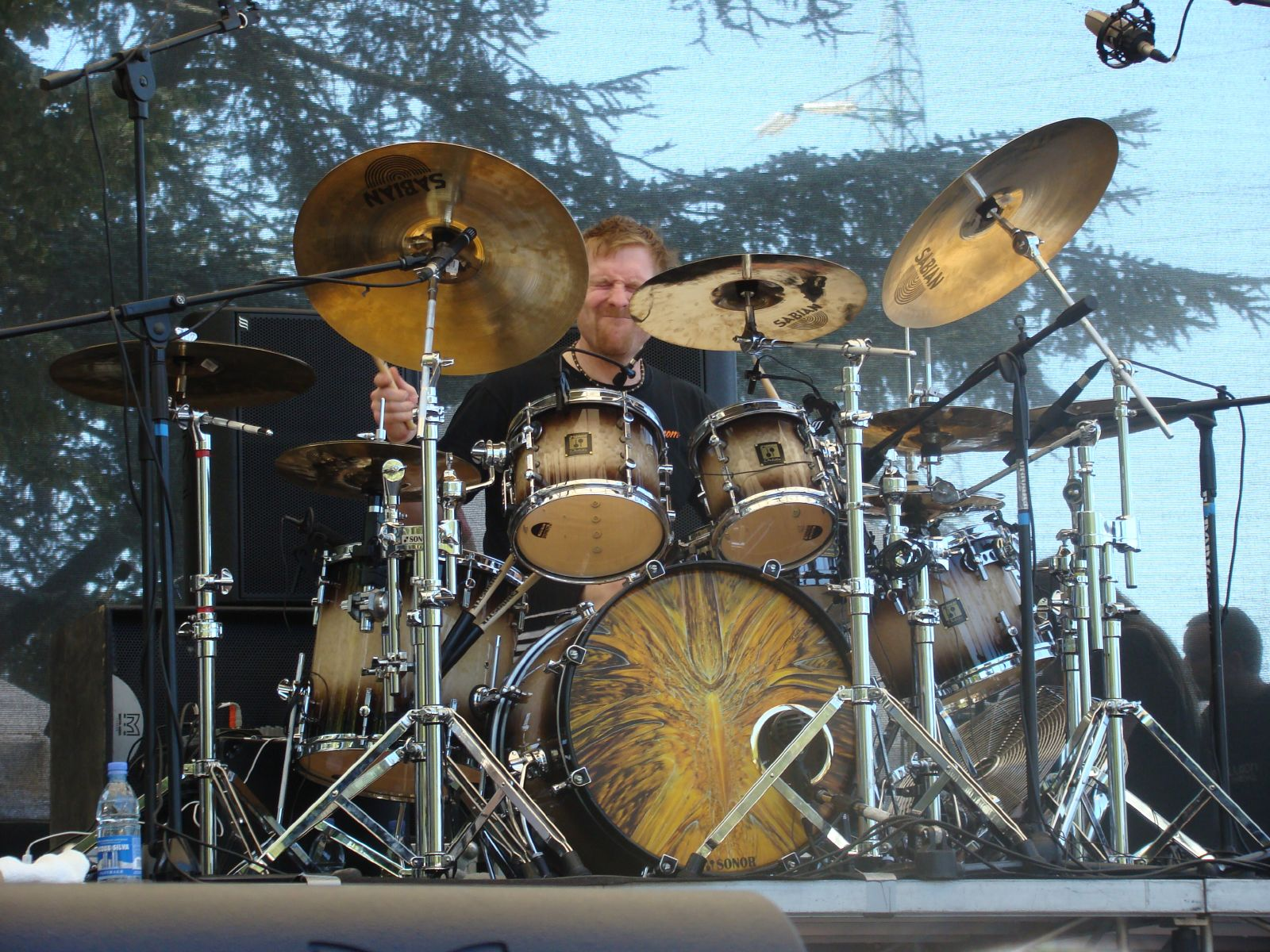
Reinert performing in 2007

Cynic

- 1988 demo (1988)
- Reflections of a Dying World demo (1989)
- 1990 demo (1990)
- 1991 demo (1991)
- Focus (1993)
- Traced in Air (2008)
- Re-Traced (2010)
- Carbon-Based Anatomy (2011)
- The Portal Tapes (2012)
- Kindly Bent to Free Us (2014)

Other

- Death − Human (1991)
- Sean Malone − Cortlandt (1996)
- Gordian Knot − Gordian Knot (1999)
- Gordian Knot − Emergent (2003)
- Aghora − Aghora (2000)
- Aghora − Formless (2006)
- Æon Spoke − Above the Buried Cry (2004)
- Æon Spoke − Æon Spoke (2007)
- Anomaly – Anomaly (1998)
- C-187 − Collision (2007)
- Levi/Werstler – Avalanche of Worms (2010)
- Sylencer – A Lethal Dose of Truth (2012) (guest drummer on "Acquiesce")
- Gruesome – Fragments of Psyche (2017) (guest drummer on title track)
- Hassan Iqbal – Of the Sky (2020)
- Amahiru – Amahiru (2020) (guest drummer on "Bringing Me Down (Alternative Version)")
- Eggshell Repair Kit – Untitled (2020)
