= Re-Traced =

EP by Cynic
- Released: May 17, 2010
- Recorded: 2009
- Genre: Progressive metal; jazz fusion
- Length: 23:08
- Label: Season of Mist
- Producer: Paul Masvidal, Sean Reinert

Cynic chronology
Traced in Air (2008)	Re-Traced (2010)	Carbon-Based Anatomy (2011)

Professional ratings
Review scores
Source	Rating
MetalSucks	(favorable)

Re-Traced is an EP by progressive metal band Cynic. It is composed of four re-interpretations of songs from their album Traced in Air, as well as one new song. It was released through Season of Mist on May 17.

== History ==
During the 2010 tour in support of Between the Buried and Me along with Scale the Summit and the Devin Townsend Project, the band performed live "an experiment". Shortly after unveiling this new work, the band announced a new EP coming soon on their MySpace blog. Tymon Kruidenier revealed in an interview the plans for the coming EP:

As most of you already know we're working on an EP. We're reinterpreting 4 songs from Traced In Air: Space, King, Evolutionary and Integral, and we will record a brand new song. There's [sic] several reasons we're doing this. We're not done yet with TiA, the album has only been out for a little over a year and we feel the songs are still fresh. Besides that we want to try different production techniques and incorporate influences from different genres we all love, but which never had a place in Cynic. So I saw someone asked how 'surprising' this EP could be? I would say: very surprising.

It was later revealed via a Youtube teaser that the EP was entitled Re-Traced.

More details were announced about the upcoming EP release on their MySpace blog. Paul Masvidal also commented on the new artwork and layout:

The artwork on the EP takes Venosa's original song paintings from the 'Traced in Air' booklet and reinterprets them by extracting the basic outlines, almost appearing as though they are etched in wood. Travis Smith helped manifest these conceptions graphically. The idea was to have the 'tracing' of the original work in tact [sic], so it almost morphs into a simple line drawing of the sculptural shapes found in Venosa's work. The end result appears like unearthed, archival etchings from an alien planet.

The EP was produced by the band with the help of Warren Riker on mixing and Maor Appelbaum on mastering.

On September 3, 2021, Cynic released a new version of "Integral" featuring the late Sean Malone on bass as a tribute, with half of the proceeds going to suicide prevention organizations To Write Love on Her Arms and The Trevor Project.

== Track listing ==
No.	Title	Length
1.	"Space" (reinterpretation of "The Space for This")	5:14
2.	"Evolutionary" (reinterpretation of "Evolutionary Sleeper")	4:25
3.	"King" (reinterpretation of "King of Those Who Know")	4:54
4.	"Integral" (reinterpretation of "Integral Birth")	3:51
5.	"Wheels Within Wheels" (previously unreleased)	4:44
Total length:		23:08

== Personnel ==
- Paul Masvidal – vocals, guitar, guitar synth
- Sean Reinert – drums, percussion
- Robin Zielhorst – bass
- Tymon Kruidenier – lead guitar
- Warren Riker - mixing
- Maor Appelbaum - mastering
