= Amy Correia =

American singer and songwriter (born 1968)

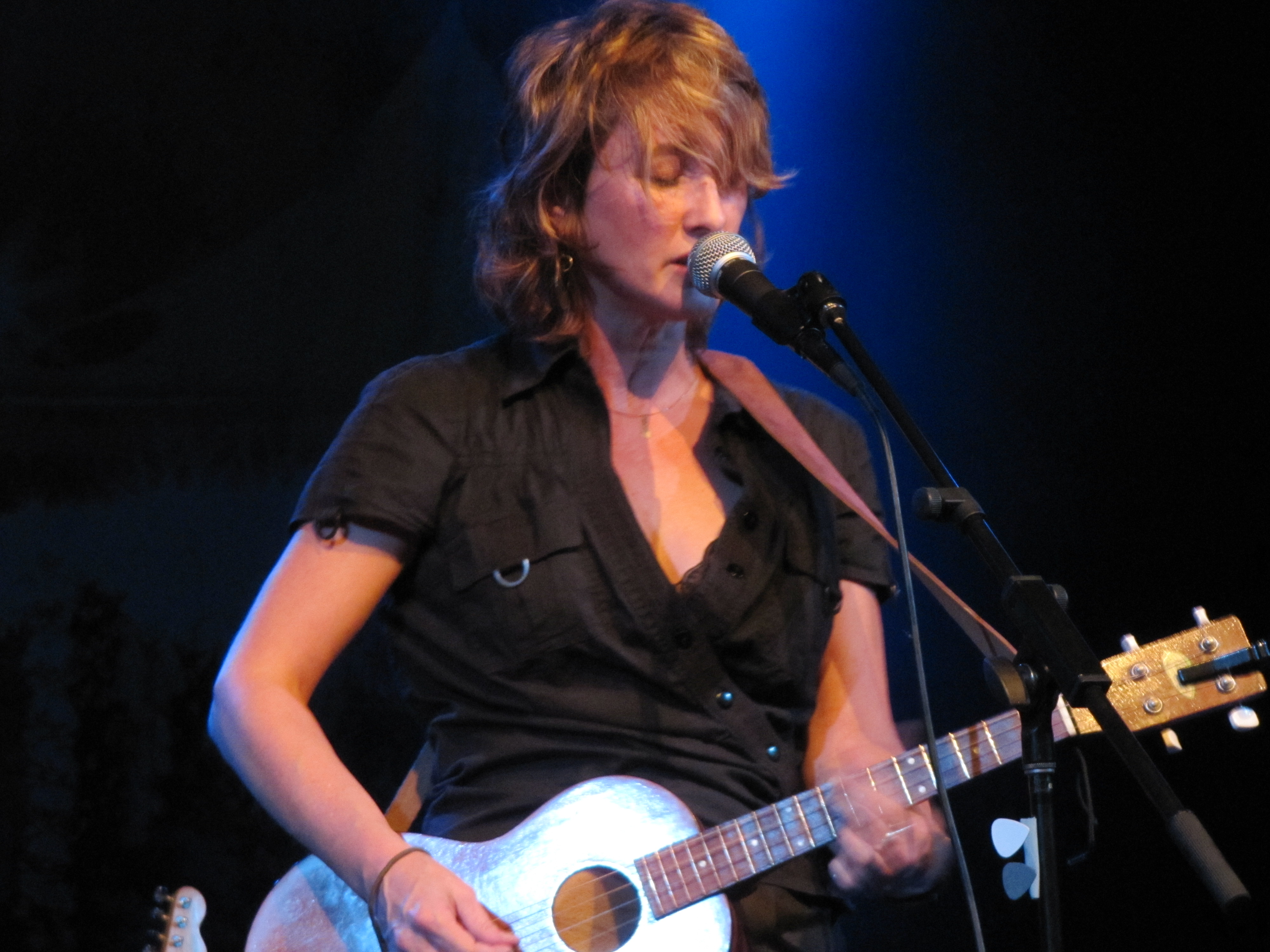
- Correia in 2010

Background information
- Born: Amy Correia
- Genres: Folk, alternative country
- Occupations: Musician, singer-songwriter
- Instruments: Guitar, vocals
- Labels: Capitol, Nettwerk
- Website: www.amycorreia.com

Amy Correia (born September 12, 1968) is an American singer and songwriter who grew up in Lakeville, Massachusetts.

== Biography ==
Correia lived in New York's Chinatown after graduating from Barnard College and Tabor Academy (Massachusetts). She worked in advertising, writing copy by day, while at night honing her songwriting and performing in clubs like Sin-é Cafe on the Lower East Side. A chance meeting with Blind Melon guitarist, Christopher Thorn, who'd stopped by the small club while on tour, led the two to make several recordings which helped Correia eventually sign with Virgin Records.

While signed to Virgin Records, Correia recorded an album of songs at Daniel Lanois' Kingsway Studios in New Orleans with Christopher Thorn producing, but the album went unfinished. Correia left Virgin with her master recordings and signed with Capitol/EMI, which released her debut "Carnival Love" in 2000. Correia recorded the album "Lakeville" with her own money. It was produced by Mark Howard, who also has produced Willie Nelson and Lucinda Williams. The Canadian label, Nettwerk, licensed and released it in 2004.

Her third album, "You Go Your Way", recorded in 2009 with producer/arranger/bassist Paul Bryan, was funded by her fans. The story was picked up by Anthony Mason for CBS News, who featured Correia as one of a growing number of artists who are looking to their fans rather than a label to fund their albums.

Correia is the recipient of three 2012 Independent Music Awards. "You Go Your Way" was named best folk/singer-songwriter album by a panel of influential artists and industry professionals. "You Go Your Way" also won the Vox Pop award, determined by fan voting, for best folk/singer-songwriter album. The single, "Love Changes Everything" won the Vox Pop award for best love song.

Correia tours throughout the U.S. and has performed with artists including Marc Cohn, Richard Thompson, John Hiatt, Freedy Johnston, Emmylou Harris, Jason Crigler, Rebecca Martin, Josh Rouse, Duncan Sheik, Norah Jones, Bonnie Raitt, Richard Julian, Jesse Harris, Ollabelle, Aimee Mann, Kenny White, Jonathan Spottiswoode, Everclear, The Dandy Warhols, Allison Moorer, Tara McLean, Kendall Payne, Shannon McNally, Charlie Musselwhite, Jon Brion, Grant Lee Phillips, Dredd Scott, Julia Fordham, Jess Klein, Kerri Powers.

On March 25, 2022, Ms. Correia released a new EP of five songs entitled 'As We Are' produced by bassist Kimon Kirk. Americana UK premiered Correia's first official video for one of the songs from this record called "The Beggar”. They wrote “It’s a powerful, emotionally connecting and effective style that works well alongside the changes in pace, the musical pauses and the moments when musical layers become more urgent. A compelling video, creatively well-thought out and well-produced, adds texture and meaning to the song.” Americana UK went on to describe ‘As We Are’ as “a reflective, introspective record, featuring well-crafted songs and thought-provoking lyrical content.”

Under the Radar Magazine' raved: "Amy Correia is an Americana poet, her plainspoken eloquence conjuring spirits of backroads overgrown with weeds and empty alleyways crowded with thickening shadows...As We Are embodies the best of Correia’s artistic abilities, serving heaps of soul without sacrificing the sophistication of its form. The effort proves both romantic and devastating, Correia’s homegrown sensibilities feeling at once familiar and elusive, her band continuing alongside her in perfect harmony. Amy Correia is a treasure of her genre, still running strong, offering glints of sunlight through the haze, finding strange beauty even in the events of loss and destitution."

== Discography ==
- 2000, Carnival Love (Capitol)
- 2004, Lakeville (Nettwerk)
- 2010, You Go Your Way (Independent release)
- 2022, As We Are (Independent release)

== Compilations and collaborations ==
- 1997, Richard Julian "Richard Julian”
- 2001, “I-10 Chronicles Vol. 2: One More for the Road” (Lead Vocalist, “Gasoline Alley/It's All Over Now”)
- 2002, "The Metropolitan Museum of Art: American Folk Music” (Composer/Arranger/Co-producer “Blind River Boy”)
- 2005, "Public Displays of Affection"(Composer/Arranger/Co-producer "Hold On")
- 2005, "She Do, She Don't" (Composer/Arranger/Co-producer "Lakeville")
- 2005, Jonathon Rice "Trouble is Real”
- 2008, "Join the Parade- Live" Marc Cohn (Featured vocalist on "Giving up the Ghost")
- 2008, "The Music of Jason Crigler" (Lead vocalist, "Bush and a Tree")
- 2008, Cynic "Traced in Air" (Seasons of Mist, 2008)
- 2011, Cynic "Carbon-Based Anatomy" (Seasons of Mist, 2011)
- 2015, Onward w Love (with Paul Masvidal from Cynic)

== Radio ==
- KCRW "Morning Becomes Eclectic" (2000)
- NPR "Mountain Stage" (2000, 2004, 2007)
- NPR/WXPN "World Café " with David Dye (2000, 2004)
- WFUV Vin Scelsa's "Idiot's Delight" (2000, 2004)
- NPR "All Songs Considered" (2004)
- NPR/WNYC "Soundcheck " (2004)
- NPR/WUMB "Wood Songs Old Time Radio Hour" (2004)

== Television ==
- 2001, "Late Night with Conan O'Brien" (NBC) – Composer/Performer, "Gin”
- 2007, "The Ellen DeGeneres Show" (NBC) – Performer, appearing with Marc Cohn
- 2007, "Good Morning America" (ABC) – Performer, appearing with Marc Cohn
- 2007, "The View" (ABC) – Performer, appearing with Marc Cohn
- 2008, "Men in Trees" (NBC) – Composer/Performer – "Daydream Car”
- 2008, "The Today Show" (NBC) – Performer, appearing with Marc Cohn

== Filmography ==
- 2000, "79 Degrees in July" (Independent) – Writer/Arranger/Co-producer, "Angels Collide" and "Glorious Bluebirds”
