= Cynic (band) =

American progressive metal band

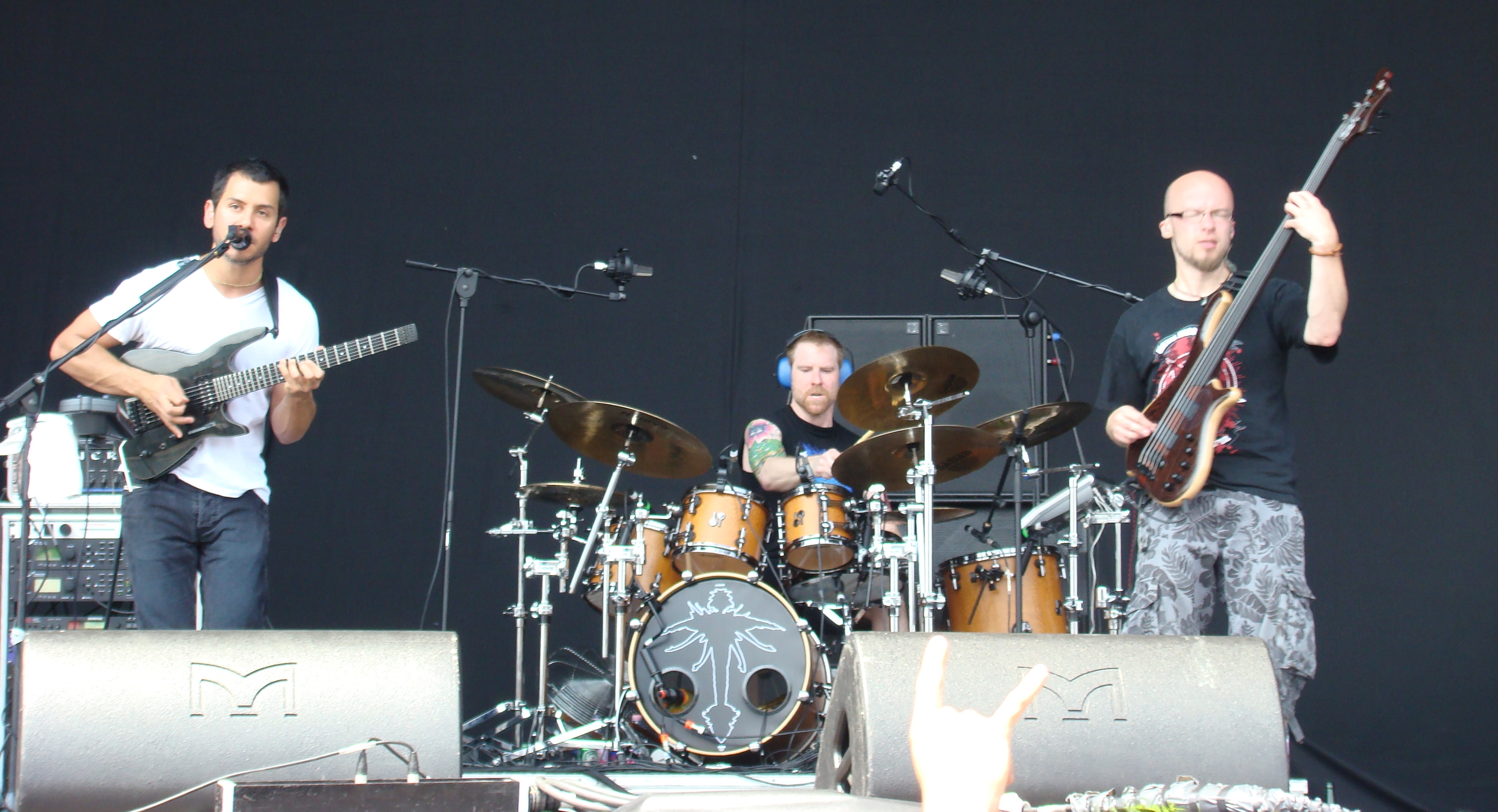
- Cynic live at Gods of Metal in 2009

Background information
- Origin: Miami, Florida, U.S.
- Genres: Progressive metal; progressive rock; jazz fusion; technical death metal
- Years active: 1987–1994; 2006–present
- Labels: Roadrunner; Season of Mist; Century Media
- Spinoffs: Æon Spoke; Gordian Knot
- Members: Paul Masvidal; Mike Gilbert; Brandon Giffin; Jake Wehn
- Past members: Sean Reinert; Sean Malone; Max Phelps; Jack Kelly; Mark Van Erp; Jason Gobel; Tony Choy; Tony Teegarden; Chris Kringel; David Senescu; Tymon Kruidenier; Matt Lynch; Robin Zielhorst; Michel Belanger
- Website: listen.cyniconline.com/bio

Cynic is an American progressive metal band formed in Miami, Florida in 1987. Paul Masvidal was originally the band's guitarist, but later took over as lead vocalist and chief songwriter. Cynic incorporates progressive rock, alternative, and metal.

Their first album, Focus, was released in 1993. Cynic disbanded in 1994, reunited in 2006, and released their second album in 2008. Traced in Air was released through French label Season of Mist, followed up by the EP Re-Traced in 2010 and the EP Carbon-Based Anatomy in 2011. Their third studio album, Kindly Bent to Free Us, was released in 2014.

In December 2017, after two years of uncertainty surrounding his involvement, founding drummer Sean Reinert confirmed his split from Cynic. Reinert later died unexpectedly, at the age of 48, in January 2020. Longtime Cynic bass player Sean Malone died at the age of 50 eleven months later. The band's fourth album, Ascension Codes, was released in December 2021.

== History ==
=== Demo era (1987–1991) ===
Guitarist and frontman Paul Masvidal and drummer Sean Reinert formed Cynic in November 1987. In 1988, the band made their first recording, the '88 Demo, with singer Jack Kelly and bassist Mark van Erp. After the demo, Masvidal took over vocals while continuing to play guitar. The band added a second guitarist, Jason Gobel. Another demo followed in 1989, Reflections of a Dying World. 1989 brought the addition of bassist Tony Choy. In 1990, the group went to the studio to record their third demo,'90 Demo. In 1991, Cynic signed with Roadrunner Records and recorded their fourth and final demo, Demo 1991.

=== Recording Focus (1991–1994) ===
Cynic did not begin recording their full-length debut album, Focus, immediately after signing a new contract with Roadrunner Records. Paul Masvidal and Sean Reinert had played on Death's 1991 album Human and were obligated to take part in the supporting European tour. During this tour, Death ran into financial trouble, which resulted in Masvidal and Reinert's gear confiscated for six months by a UK promoter. During this time, the band parted with bassist Tony Choy (who joined Atheist). Choy was replaced with Sean Malone. The band planned to record Focus in August 1992, but the day they were to begin recording, Hurricane Andrew struck Florida and destroyed Gobel's home and the band's rehearsal space, leading to months of delay. The band used this time to write new material, much of which is featured on Focus. Tony Teegarden was brought in to do the death growls, but Masvidal recorded all the vocoder vocals.

Focus was released internationally on September 14, 1993.

Cynic toured extensively worldwide throughout 1993 and 1994, including the Dynamo Open Air Festival in May 1994.

Asked in a 2012 interview on Prog-Sphere.com about Focus material, Masvidal said:

Sometimes you just burn out on material and we have toured Focus quite a bit. It does have a history and it obviously had an impact as an album, but at some point you do have to move on. With another album under our belts we'll have enough material to really give people a whole body of new material to focus on instead of the past. But I enjoy Focus and to me it does seem like a record that represented something for us that was really honest. And I think it was a solid album, so it's cool that it got some recognition.

— Paul Masvidal

=== First disbandment (1994−2006) ===
Musical and personal differences halted work on a second studio album. The group disbanded, and most of its members turned to side projects.

Gobel, Masvidal, and Reinert, with bassist Chris Kringel and vocalist/keyboardist Aruna Abrams, formed the short-lived Portal in 1994. The band featured slower tempos and few distorted guitars compared to Cynic, but still had a complex, layered sound. A total of 10 tracks were recorded as pre-production demos, which were never officially released until 2012, where it was released as The Portal Tapes under the Cynic name. Masvidal and Reinert released an album with a more recent project, the indie act Æon Spoke, on SPV Records and Kringel played with them, touring the UK in 2005. The members of Cynic loosely reunited (playing with Bill Bruford, Steve Hackett, and Jim Matheos on various tracks) on Gordian Knot's second album, Emergent.

=== Reunion (2006−2008) ===
In September 2006, Paul Masvidal announced that Cynic was reuniting to perform during spring/summer of 2007. During June/July/August 2007, they played 15 shows across Europe, predominantly at major metal/rock festivals. The setlist consisted of songs from Focus, Portal's demo, a cover of Mahavishnu Orchestra's "Meeting of the Spirits," and a new song, "Evolutionary Sleeper."

The reunion featured founding members Masvidal on guitar/vocals and Reinert on drums. Gobel, the longtime guitarist who played on Focus, could not participate due to family and work commitments, and David "Mavis" Senescu was brought aboard as a replacement. Malone, who played bass on Focus, was unavailable due to teaching and work commitments, and Chris Kringel, who played bass on the 1993 European tour, was brought in as a replacement. All death growls were handled by pre-recordings of Teegarden. All keyboards were covered by Masvidal and Senescu using guitar synths.

In early 2008, the band announced plans for a second studio album. Malone rejoined the lineup and Dutch guitarist Tymon Kruidenier of Exivious was added, the latter contributing death growls.

=== Traced in Air and Re-Traced (2008−2011) ===
Traced in Air was released internationally November 17, 2008, on Season of Mist, followed by Robin Zielhorst being added as touring bassist.

The band played at the Wacken Open Air festival. The Traced in Air tour cycle began in Autumn 2008 with direct support slots for Opeth on their European tour.

Starting in February 2009, Cynic toured North America with Meshuggah and The Faceless, and beginning April 15, 2009, Cynic toured North America in support of DragonForce.

During the 2010 tour in support of Between the Buried and Me, along with Scale the Summit and the Devin Townsend Project, the band performed live "an experiment" titled "Wheels Within Wheels." Shortly after unveiling this new work, the band announced an upcoming EP on their MySpace blog. Masvidal revealed in an interview the plans for the coming EP:

'Re-Traced' is an experiment for us – an opportunity to turn four songs from 'Traced in Air' inside out and to share something new ... In our exploration, we've created music that is part 'sci-fi prog folk,' part psychedelic rock, part minimalist restraint. These interpretations feel channeled from another galaxy ... For the most part, the tunes reference some of our favourite musical forms and in our own curious way (electronic/ambient, jazz/fusion, drum n' bass, experimental, shoegaze). There is no vocoder, no traditionally busy Cynic riffs that are some of our most signature sounds, but the music retains its song structure, integral melodic sense, harmony and lyrical inspiration.

— Paul Masvidal

Later blogs on MySpace revealed that the EP would be titled Re-Traced.

In May 2010, Cynic announced their first US headlining tour, titled "Re-Traced / Re-Focused Live". Cynic performed their debut album, Focus, in its entirety, among other tracks. The tour was co-sponsored by Decibel Magazine as its inaugural "Hall of Fame" tour series. It kicked off on July 22, 2010, in Los Angeles with Intronaut and Dysrhythmia as supporting bands. The tour ended on August 13, 2010. The final show took place in Fort Lauderdale, Florida. It was the band's first hometown performance in 16 years.

In December 2010, the band announced that bassist Robin Zielhorst and guitarist Tymon Kruidenier left Cynic for logistical and other reasons. In the same announcement, Masvidal and Reinert set the approximate release schedule for Cynic's next album, stating that "the new Cynic release should be coming in late 2011 on the Season of Mist label", and, in addition, "[t]hey are also working towards a remixed re-release of their classic recording 'Focus.'"

=== Carbon-Based Anatomy and Kindly Bent to Free Us (2011−2014) ===
Cynic's website announced that the band was working on a new album and the "first baby steps into this gigantic process are being taken right now, creating little embryos of songs that will turn into fully fledged Cynic tunes over the course of the following months."

On September 6, 2011, Cynic announced the EP Carbon-Based Anatomy would be released on November 11, 2011, in Europe, and November 15, 2011, in the United States. The artwork was designed by Robert Venosa, the artist behind the cover artworks of Focus, Traced in Air and Re-Traced, shortly before his death. All bass parts on Carbon-Based Anatomy were recorded by Sean Malone, who had previously recorded the bass parts to Focus and Traced in Air.

Paul Masvidal describes this new EP as:

...both a philosophical as well as a musical journey, one that begins in the Amazon jungle on the lips of a shamanic wisewoman (as portrayed by Amy Correia) and ends in outerspace.

On October 10, 2011, Cynic uploaded one song from the EP, titled "Carbon-Based Anatomy", and announced that Brandon Giffin and Max Phelps would play live with the band. Brandon Giffin is a former bassist for The Faceless and Max Phelps would play the second guitar and provide backing vocals. The band completed a North American and European tour in support of the EP in November and December 2011.

Commenting on a musical shift from metal elements in an interview on Prog-Sphere.com, Masvidal says:

I think every record kind of develops its own thing based on a process and I don't really know what it's gonna sound like until we're really doing it. I think Cynic was always outside the box and never a traditional metal band to begin with, so we're probably going further in a direction that'll sound more like Cynic and less than anything else familiar. Really, it's too soon to say right now – the material exists, but not as a production. They're just little songs, so – we'll see. (laughs)

— Paul Masvidal

In March 2012, Cynic released via Season of Mist an album of demos that were produced as a follow-up to Focus back in 1995, entitled The Portal Tapes.

On December 12, 2012, Cynic announced through their official website that Masvidal, Reinert and Sean Malone were entering the studio in "trio mode" to record their fifth release. They revealed the title of their third studio album and its cover on November 10, 2013, on their official Facebook page. The album, Kindly Bent to Free Us, was released on February 14, 2014.

In May 2014, Paul Masvidal and Sean Reinert publicly revealed their homosexuality, a decision that the heavy metal community widely supported.

=== Breakup rumors, new music, and deaths (2015−2021) ===
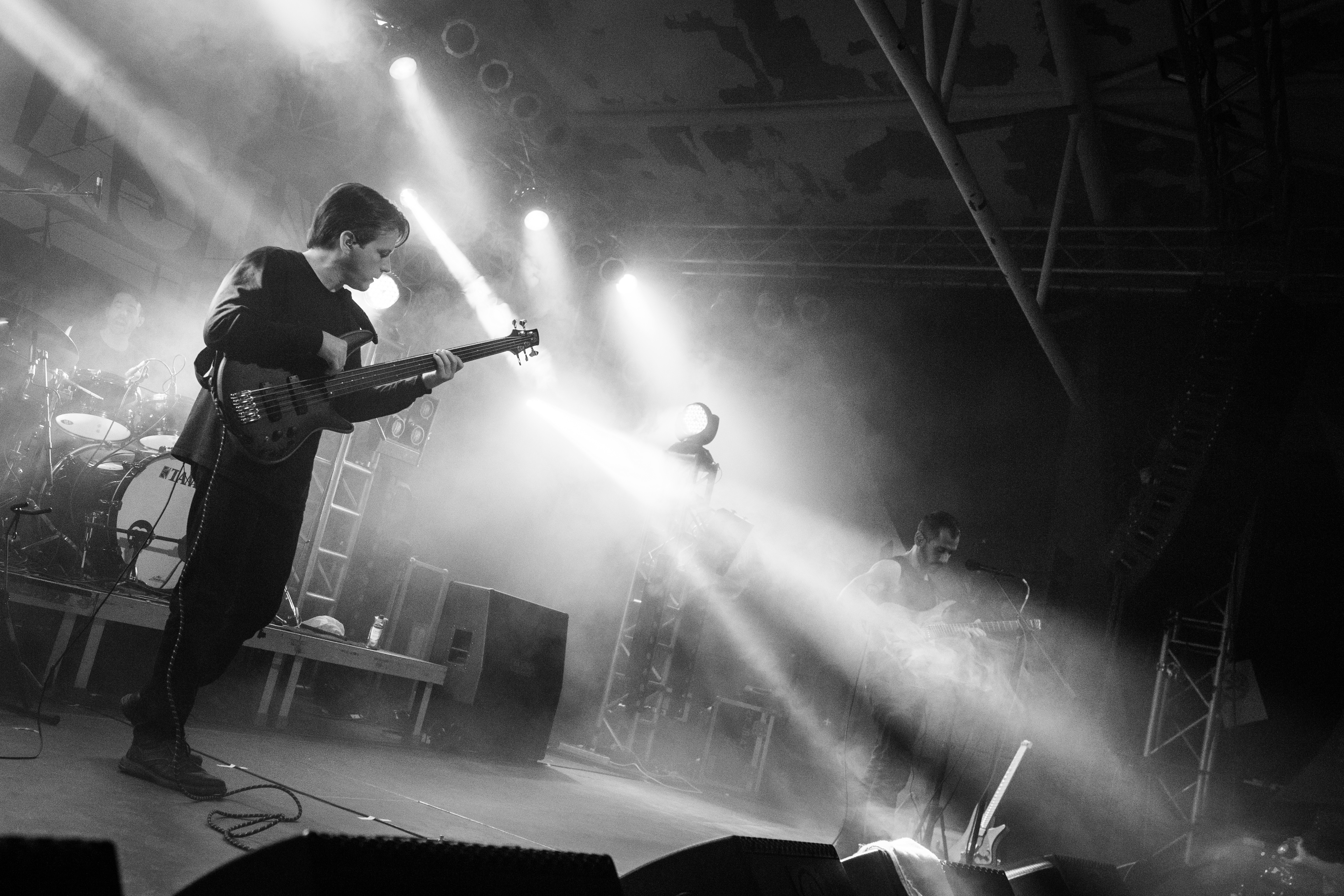
Cynic at Euroblast 2015

On September 10, 2015, Reinert announced Cynic's disbandment due to artistic and personal differences. Later that day, Masvidal claimed that there was no disbandment, and that Reinert did not consult the other bandmates on the issue. He announced that the band would continue in "one way or another." On September 18, 2015, it was confirmed that Cynic would perform without Reinert, and would recruit Trioscapes drummer Matt Lynch to fulfill a festival commitment, Germany's Euroblast Festival on October 3 as scheduled.

In 2017, Century Media released Uroboric Forms – The Complete Demo Collection 1988–1991. That December, Reinert announced his official split from Cynic, stating: "A settlement has been reached between Paul and... I am at peace with the arrangement."

On January 15, 2018, Cynic digitally released "Humanoid", their first song in four years and their first without Reinert. Loudersound listed Cynic on the 4th of July special amongst the Ten Great American Prog Rock Bands.

Reinert died on January 24, 2020. Hank Shteamer of Rolling Stone magazine wrote a tribute to Reinert shortly after his passing commemorating his contributions to Death and Cynic. Malone died on December 9, 2020. On September 3, 2021, Paul Masvidal revealed that Malone died by suicide, sharing a new version of "Integral Birth" titled "Integral", featuring a bass track recorded by Malone as tribute.

=== Ascension Codes and next album (2021−present) ===
On September 15, 2021, Cynic announced a new album titled Ascension Codes. A track from the album, "Mythical Serpents", was released. The album was released on November 26, 2021. It was elected by Metal Hammer as the 3rd best progressive metal album of 2021. The song "Mythical Serpents" was elected by Loudwire as the 9th best metal song of 2021.

On August 1, 2022, it was announced that Masvidal and Warren Riker completed a remix of Focus, with a release date to be determined.

On January 27, 2023, Cynic played their first live show in eight years at the Knitting Factory in Los Angeles. The "secret" show had the band billed as "Uroboric Forms", with the lineup consisting of Masvidal on vocals and guitar, Max Phelps on death growls and guitar, Brandon Giffin on bass, and Matt Lynch on drums and percussion. The performance was a "warm-up" show before their appearance on the 70000 Tons of Metal cruise.

In April 2023, it was announced that the new line-up of Cynic had been working on new material for their fifth studio album.

To celebrate the 30th anniversary of Focus, the album was remixed, remastered and released as ReFocus on June 9, 2023.

== Musical style ==
Dom Lawson of Metal Hammer described Cynic's music as "fervently progressive and otherworldly." The band's early recordings feature a more punk rock, thrash metal, and hardcore punk sound, but in the 1990s their sound changed towards a highly complex, experimental and extremely technical form of progressive metal, while still retaining their death metal roots. Their 1990 demo displays a hyper-technical form of death/thrash, and the following 1991 Roadrunner demo bears a notable resemblance to Death and jazz-death metal pioneers Atheist, featuring two songs from Focus in cruder, more brutal form. Many influences from jazz and jazz-rock fusion can be heard on their debut album Focus. Focus has both "growls" and "robotic" vocals, using a vocoder. The offshoot Portal later released a demo recording that continues even further in the direction of progressive space rock, refining and softening up their sound.

Cynic's 2008 album Traced in Air fused the styles and influences heard on 1993's Focus with the more progressive-oriented Portal approach. The result had Cynic put less emphasis on its extreme metal elements, with new guttural vocalist Tymon Kruidenier playing a smaller role than Tony Teegarden did on Focus. Additionally, Paul Masvidal all but abandoned his vocoder robotic vocals, opting instead for a more natural singing voice, and making limited use of a subtler effect he dubbed the "android".

Noting the band's musical progression, The New York Times proclaimed in a positive review of Traced in Air that: "Cynic should be understood not so much alongside any metal bands but along with the radical harmonic progressives in the last 45 years of pop and jazz: composers like Milton Nascimento, The Beach Boys or Pat Metheny."

== Legacy ==
In 2009, Chris Dick of Decibel Magazine inducted Cynic into the Decibel Hall of Fame. He said: "Cynic weren't emulators. The aggression was there. But the mindset contrasted vastly. In fact, more was owed to crossover heroes Ludichrist and thrash metal mavericks Voivod than to any band from the Sunshine State. They were innovators. Post-Andrew, Masvidal and company developed wider and deeper tastes, seamlessly stitching in new influences like jazz fusion, progressive rock and shoegaze to create new, imaginative shapes..."

Dom Lawson of Metal Hammer wrote, "Cynic never lost the legendary status facilitated by their first musical efforts."

== Members ==
Current members

- Paul Masvidal — guitar, keyboards, guitar synthesizer (1987–1994, 2006–present), lead vocals (1988–1994, 2006–present)
- Brandon Giffin — bass (2022–present; 2011–2014 touring)
- Mike Gilbert — guitar (2024–present)
- Jake Wehn — drums (2025–present)

Former members

- Sean Reinert — drums, percussion, keyboards (1987–1994, 2006–2015; died 2020)
- Mark van Erp — bass (1987–1989)
- Esteban "Steve" Rincon — lead vocals (1987–1988)
- Russell Mofsky — guitar (1987–1988)
- Jack Kelly — vocals (1988)
- Jason Gobel — guitar, keyboards, guitar synthesizer (1988–1994)
- Tony Choy — bass (1989–1993)
- Sean Malone — bass, Chapman stick (1993–1994, 2008–2020; died 2020)
- Chris Kringel — bass (1993; 2006–2008 touring)
- Tony Teegarden — keyboards, unclean vocals (2006–2007; 1993 touring)
- Santiago Dobles — guitar (2006–2007)
- David "Mavis" Senescu — guitar, keyboards, guitar synthesizer (2007–2008)
- Tymon Kruidenier — guitar, keyboards, guitar synthesizer, unclean vocals (2008–2010)
- Robin Zielhorst — bass (2008–2010)
- Max Phelps — guitar, unclean vocals (2011–2015; 2022–2024 touring)
- Matt Lynch — drums, percussion (2015–2025)
- Zeke Kaplan — keyboards (2022–2024)

Former touring musicians

- Dana Cosley — keyboards, unclean vocals (1994)
- Steffen Kummerer — unclean vocals (2024)
- Michel Belanger — drums (2025; substitute for Jake Wehn)

== Discography ==
Studio albums

- Focus (1993)
- Traced in Air (2008)
- Kindly Bent to Free Us (2014)
- Ascension Codes (2021)

Demo albums

- 1988 Demo (1988)
- Reflections of a Dying World (1989)
- 1990 Demo (1990)
- 1991 Demo (1991)

EPs

- Re-Traced (2010)
- Carbon-Based Anatomy (2011)

Singles

- "Humanoid" (2018)

Compilation albums

- Uroboric Forms – The Complete Demo Recordings (2017)

== Bibliography ==
- Wagner, Jeff (2010). Mean Deviation: Four Decades of Progressive Heavy Metal. Bazillion Points. ISBN 978-0-9796163-3-4.
