= Chris Kringel =

American bass player

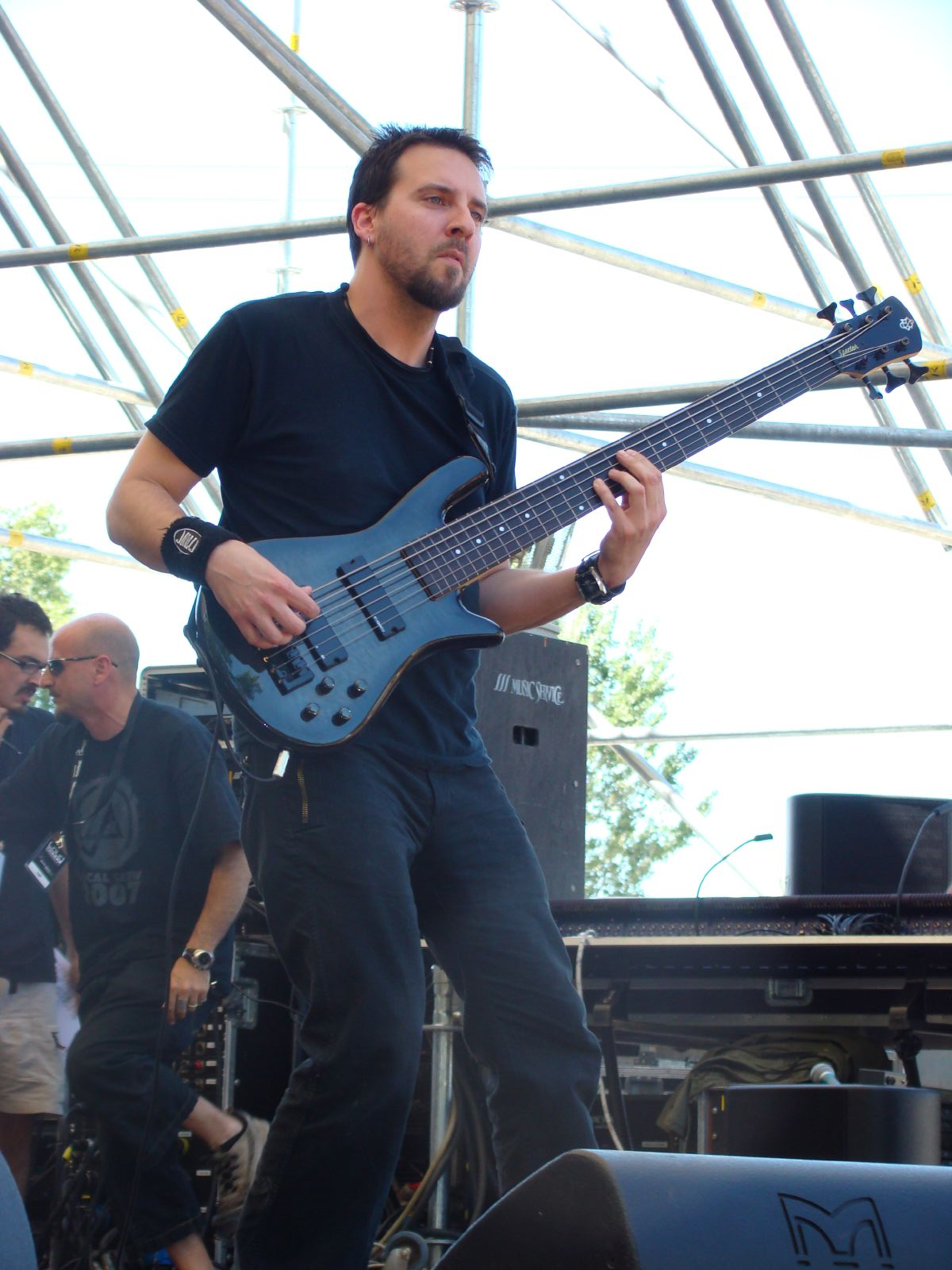

Background information
- Origin: Appleton, Wisconsin, United States
- Genres: Jazz fusion progressive rock progressive metal
- Occupation: Bass Player/Producer/Author
- Instrument: bass guitar
- Website: https://web.archive.org/web/20061004043157/http://kringelbass.com:80/

Chris Kringel is an American bass player. He is the author of several instructional books for the bass guitar. He was born in Appleton, Wisconsin and lives in Milwaukee. In 1995, he recorded Demos with the post-breakup Cynic band Portal. After a while, he was also involved in another Cynic-linked project, Æon Spoke, recording Demos2000. Playing live with Cynic when they reunited in 2007, as band's original bassist Sean Malone was unavailable for touring, Masvidal called Kringel and he performed on a number of world-wide shows from the 2007 Cynic Reunion Tour. He currently produces several Play A-Long series for Hal Leonard Publishing, does production and recording for several artists and performs in the Milwaukee area.

== Books authored ==
- Fretless Bass (Hal Leonard, 2007; ISBN 978-0-634-08053-1)
- Funk Bass (Hal Leonard, 2004; ISBN 978-0-634-06710-5)
- Play Bass Today! Songbook (Hal Leonard, 2001; ISBN 978-0-634-02849-6)
- The Bassist's Guide To Creativity (Hal Leonard, 2010; ISBN 9781423405566)
- Essential Bass Guitar Techniques (Hal Leonard, 2013; ISBN 9781480342408)
- Play Bass Today! – Level 1 (Hal Leonard, 2000; ISBN 9780634021848)
- Play Bass Today! – Level 2 (Hal Leonard, 2001; ISBN 9780634028489)
- 100 Blues Lesson (Hal Leonard, 2014; ISBN 9781480397460)
- 100 Funk/R&B Lessons(Hal Leonard, 2014; ISBN 9781480398450)

== Discography ==
- Portal – Demo (1995)
- Æon Spoke – Above The Buried Cry (2007)
- Fibonacci Sequence – Numerology (2010)
- Fibonacci Sequence – We Three Kings (2010)
- Inda Eaton – Why The Desert (2000)
- Chris Kringel/Del Bennett – I Said (2009)
