= Traced in Air =

Studio album by Cynic
- Released: November 25, 2008
- Recorded: 2008
- Studio: Broken Wave Studios, Los Angeles
- Genre: Progressive metal; progressive death metal; jazz fusion
- Length: 34:17
- Label: Season of Mist
- Producer: Paul Masvidal, Warren Riker

Cynic chronology
Focus (1993)	Traced in Air (2008)	Re-Traced (2010)

Professional ratings
Review scores
Source	Rating
About.com	4/5 stars
Allmusic	3.5/5 stars
Blabbermouth.net	9/10
Collector's Guide to Heavy Metal	8/10
Sputnikmusic	5.0/5
Terrorizer Magazine	9.5/10

Traced in Air is the second studio album by the progressive metal band Cynic. It is the first album since their 1993 debut Focus.

== History ==
Cynic disbanded during the fall of 1994 while working on a new album. On January 17, 2008, Cynic resumed musical activity and Paul Masvidal said he wanted to complete the project after the Reunion Tour. It was originally believed that Cynic would be working with Jason Suecof of Capharnaum fame. However, Warren Riker (Down's producer) was working with the band. Tymon Kruidenier was then announced as a hired replacement for guitarist David Senescu. Kruidenier also handled the death growls for the album.

On July 19, 2008, Cynic announced through YouTube that the album's name is Traced in Air. The release date for Traced in Air was pushed back to November 17, 2008 in Europe, and November 25, 2008 in North America. All album artwork was designed by Robert Venosa. A remixed version of the album, Traced in Air Remixed, was released on September 27, 2019. The remix was produced by Adam "Nolly" Getgood, and featured new bass tracks from Sean Malone. The growled vocals of Kruidenier were also mostly removed from the remixed version.

== Style ==
In 2008, drummer Sean Reinert gave an update on the second studio album and its musical style in an interview with Metal Hammer saying:

Yeah we got tons and tons of stuff lying around man from '94 [1994] to the present day man, it's gonna be great. Everyone can expect something stylistically the same as Focus but more upbeat, energetic and most important of all, pretty god damn brutal! I mean we're gonna mix in Bullacake by Niche Dexplicit into one of our songs but will be using real scary riffs and solos and more savage growling as well as Paul's robotic vocals and keyboarding. Basically all the shit which was there on Focus is all gonna be there with this new one too. But with some new things bundled in and a bit more brutal. It's gonna be good

— Sean Reinert

Paul Masvidal announced in 2008 in an interview with Kerrang! magazine that the band were including two unreleased songs from when the band were working on the album in 1994, into the album.

In July 2008, Blabbermouth revealed Masvidal had this to say on the album:

We've been on an amazing journey discovering this new music and soon it will be yours. Expect the unexpected. The album is an intensely concentrated mosaic of internal and external energies, from the deepest peace to the purest aggression. There's an acquired taste that comes with a record of this density, but once your ears wrap themselves around the language at work, everything falls into place and suddenly you'll feel a sudden urge to sing, scream or maybe even cry. The album has a beginning, middle and end. The story will reveal itself after numerous listens and then you may not want to let go. Besides Reinert and I, Tymon brought some new life force and magic to the record with fierce growling and poetic guitar sensibilities. Malone also did a fine job with the low end, grooving away with Reinert in a pocket land from hell!

— Paul Masvidal

In 2008, Loudwire magazine ranked Traced In Air as #2 in the 10 Best Metal Albums of 2008. The first track and the last track of this album juxtapose each other by being exact opposites, both different philosophies of time. Nunc fluens, Latin for "flowing now," is the belief in time and the flow of it through an eternity, never beginning nor stopping. Nunc stans, Latin for "abiding now", is the belief that time itself doesn't exist, and that any distinctions between now, before and the future have either fallen away or don't exist.

In 2018, Decibel Magazine ranked Traced In Air as #4 in the Top Ten Metal Reunion Albums.

In 2019, Dominik Böhmer of the blog EverythingIsNoise.net wrote:

"Where would we be without Cynic? Where would Cynic be without Traced In Air? I don’t want to imagine that world. 2008’s LP by the crown princes of progressive metal set the high watermark for progressive metal in the new millennium, one that has arguably still not been surpassed."

Wil Lewellyn of Treblezine.com listed Traced In Air amongst the 10 Essential Sci-Fi Metal Albums:

"The album is sonically heavier than Focus, but no less overt in its prominent jazz influence, with tracks like “Evolutionary Sleeper” showing they could defy time and be the band from the past and a band from the future at the same time." – Wil Lewellyn

== Track listing ==
No.	Title	Length
1.	"Nunc Fluens"	2:56
2.	"The Space for This"	5:46
3.	"Evolutionary Sleeper"	3:35
4.	"Integral Birth"	3:53
5.	"The Unknown Guest"	4:13
6.	"Adam's Murmur"	3:29
7.	"King of Those Who Know"	6:09
8.	"Nunc Stans"	4:13
Total length:		34:17

== Personnel ==
- Paul Masvidal – vocals, guitar, guitar synth
- Sean Reinert – drums, percussion
- Sean Malone – bass, Chapman Stick
- Tymon Kruidenier – guitar, death growls
- Amy Correia – background vocals
