= Sean Malone =

American musician (1970–2020)

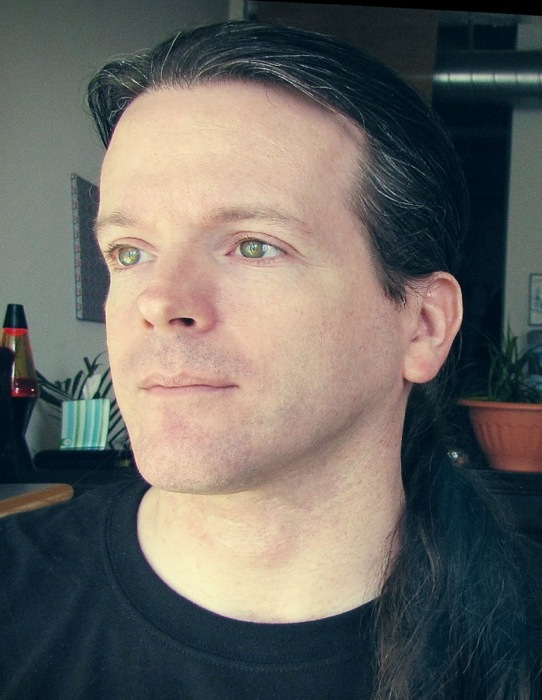
- Malone in 2013

Background information
- Born: April 12, 1970; Delran Township, New Jersey, U.S.
- Died: December 7, 2020 (aged 50) Largo, Florida, U.S.
- Genres: Progressive metal; jazz; rock; progressive rock, instrumental rock; jazz fusion
- Instruments: Bass guitar, Chapman Stick, piano, keyboards, guitar
- Labels: Roadrunner, AudioImage, Sensory, Season of Mist
- Formerly of: Cynic, Gordian Knot, Aghora, Cygnus, Gary Willis, Mike Portnoy, Paul Gilbert, Steven Wilson, John Wesley Multi-Color House

Sean Malone (April 12, 1970 – December 7, 2020) was an American musician who played primarily fretless bass guitar and Chapman Stick. He was most famous for his work with progressive metal band Cynic, in which he developed a strong partnership with the drummer Sean Reinert; both played on several records together outside of Cynic. Malone also did a number of session jobs for various bands and musicians.

== Career ==
=== Music ===
Early in his career, Malone played as a session member for groups ranging from latin jazz and bossa nova to British pop music. He started in 1988 with the Florida-based Pop-Rock group Multi-Color House, and contributed Bass and Chapman Stick (as well as songwriting) to their self-titled debut in 1990. His first high-level experience in metal music was in 1993 with the progressive metal band Cynic from Florida. Malone became Cynic's bassist quite unexpectedly; the band had a scheduled recording of their debut album, Focus in a studio in which Malone was working as an assistant engineer, and session musician. The band had suddenly parted ways with Darren McFarland (who also had a brief stint with Atheist), and hired Malone to play bass on their soon-to-be-recorded LP. Malone proved to have ideal musical chemistry with the group, and ended up touring for Focus in 1993.

After the band's first split, Malone continued to work as a session bassist, performing on over fifty records. He has also authored four books, "Music Theory for Bassists", "Dictionary Of Bass Grooves", "Rock Bass", and "A Portrait of Jaco: The Solos Collection" (a book of transcriptions of Jaco Pastorius' bass solos) for the Hal Leonard Corporation. In the academic field, Malone has papers on theory and music cognition published and given presentations at conferences such as the Society for Music Theory, The International Conference of Music and Gesture, and The Glenn Gould Conference, and has taught at the University of Central Missouri and Carnegie Mellon University as assistant professor of music theory.

Malone made one album under his own name, Cortlandt, which was released in 1996 and reissued in 2007. He also assembled and recorded the Gordian Knot debut, Gordian Knot, released in 1999. The album has contributions from Trey Gunn (King Crimson), Ron Jarzombek (Watchtower, Spastic Ink, Blotted Science) and John Myung (Dream Theater). A second Gordian Knot album, Emergent, included performances from Bill Bruford (Yes, King Crimson), Jim Matheos (Fates Warning), and Steve Hackett (Genesis, GTR), as well as Cynic members Sean Reinert, Paul Masvidal and Jason Gobel.

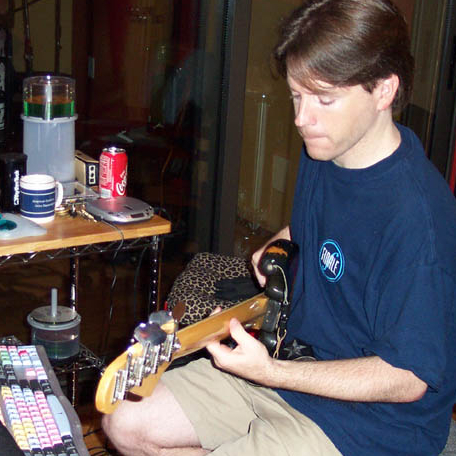
Malone performing

He re-joined Cynic with Reinert and Masvidal in May 2008 and recorded on their comeback album titled Traced in Air, which received very high critical acclaim. The album was released 14 years after the release of their previous and highly successful Focus. However, he did not tour with the band because of his university teaching priorities. In September 2011, Cynic confirmed that Malone has recorded on their EP titled Carbon-Based Anatomy. On December 12, 2012, Cynic announced that the band has entered the studio in a trio mode with Malone to record the new album, Kindly Bent to Free Us.

In Vancouver on July 6, 2014, Malone performed live on stage with Cynic for the first time in 20 years since the Focus era.

=== Other ventures ===
Malone took a scholarly approach to the subject of pencils, and spent years documenting the cultural significance of the Eberhard Faber Blackwing 602 pencil. He also travelled around the US and Germany, interviewing both Eberhard Faber IV (head of Eberhard Faber in the US) and the late Count Anton von Faber-Castell (head of Faber-Castell in Germany). He was known in pencil circles as the creator of both Blackwing Pages and the "Contrapuntalism" blog.

Malone was interviewed on camera for the 2015 documentary film No. 2: The Story of the Pencil. He mentioned completing almost 300 pages of a pencil book, though he doubted the commercial viability.

Malone was a Glenn Gould scholar. He restored and archived the Canadian Broadcasting Corporation Glenn Gould video recordings and documented his research about him. He published the article "Glenn Gould and the Nature of Competition" in Glenn Gould Magazine.

== Death ==
On December 9, 2020, Paul Masvidal announced that Malone had died. On September 3, 2021, Masvidal publicly announced that Malone died by suicide on December 7, 2020. He subsequently released a new version of "Integral" featuring a bass track recorded by Malone as a tribute, with half of the proceeds going to suicide prevention organizations To Write Love on Her Arms and The Trevor Project.

== Discography ==
=== Cynic ===
- Focus (1993)
- Traced in Air (2008)
- Carbon-Based Anatomy (2011)
- Kindly Bent to Free Us (2014)
- Humanoid (2018)

=== Solo & Gordian Knot ===
- Cortlandt (1996)
- Gordian Knot – Gordian Knot (1999)
- Gordian Knot – Emergent (2003)

=== Other ===
- John Wesley – "Under The Red And White Sky" (1994)
- John Wesley – "The Closing Of The Pale Blue Eyes" (1995)
- Anomaly – Anomaly (1998)
- Aghora – Aghora (2000)
- OSI – Office of Strategic Influence (2003)
- John Wesley – A Way You'll Never be... (2016)

=== As a guest ===
- Roadrunner United – The All Star Sessions (fretless bass on "Dawn Of a Golden Age")
- Spastic Ink – Ink Compatible (fretless bass on "In Memory Of...")
- Spiral Architect – A Sceptic's Universe (grand stick on "Occam's Razor")
- Clockwork – Surface Tension (grand stick on "East of Knowing")

=== Partial discography and other work ===
- Cygnus & The Sea Monsters – One Night in Chicago
- John Wesley – Under the Red and White Sky (1994)
- John Wesley – The Closing of the Pale Blue Eyes (1995)
- James LaBrie – Prime Cuts
- Freak Neil Inc. – Characters (2005)
- After the Storm – A Benefit for the Survivors of Hurricane Katrina
- Sensory Records Sampler CD: "Singularity" from Gordian Knot
- Tappistry Volume 2 Compilation – ToeTappin' Records "Redemption's Way" with Greg Howard
- Open Mic Volume 1 Compilation – Thoroughbred Music "Madman"
- Bass Talk Volume 5 Compilation – HotWire Records (Germany) "Deep Blue"
- Working Man, A Tribute to Rush – Magna Carta Records
- Tappistry: Volume 1, Compilation ToeTappin' Records
- Jim Studnicki: The Second Day
- Guitars That Rule the World Compilation: "Explosion"
- Curtis Bell: The ABC's of Song
- Southeastern Music Conference Compilation: Todd Grubbs "French Toast"
- Randy Goodgame: Randall Goodgame – Red Fish Records
- Notes From the Underground: Guitar World Magazine
- Lance Rowland: Prince, Poet, Prisoner
- Guitar Magazine Compilation CD: "Size 5 Lightning Boots"
- Curtis Bell: Sojourner – Independent
- Robert Wegmann: Red Hair – Fumiko Records
- Tim Mullally: Mountain Hike (independent)
- Todd Grubbs: Combination – Appollon International (Japan)
- Steel Tears: Palma Negra R&R Records
- Southeastern Music Conference Compilation, Steel Tears
- Smashmouth: Seed (independent)
- Robert Wegmann: The Wild Party – Fumiko Records
- groovediggers: groovediggers (independent)
- Steel Tears: Steel Tears – R&R Records
