= Gordian Knot (band) =

American progressive metal band

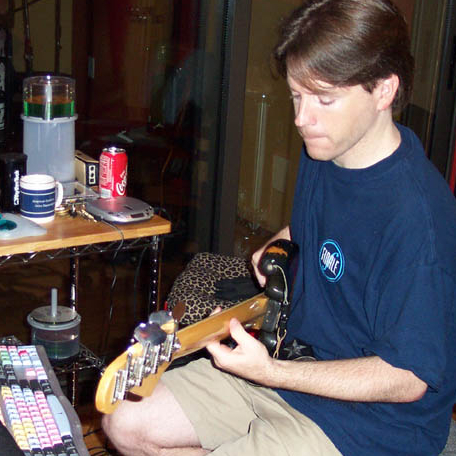
- Sean Malone of Gordian Knot

Background information
- Origin: United States
- Genres: Progressive metal
- Years active: 1998–2020
- Past members: Sean Malone

Gordian Knot was an American progressive metal project directed by bass guitarist Sean Malone. Two albums were released, which included contributions from the likes of Steve Hackett of Genesis, Bill Bruford of Yes and King Crimson, Ron Jarzombek of Watchtower and Spastic Ink, as well as Jim Matheos of Fates Warning, several of Malone's former bandmates from Cynic, and John Myung of Dream Theater. Malone died in 2020, putting an end to the project.

== Discography ==
- Gordian Knot (1999)
- Emergent (2003)
