= Robert Venosa =

American artist

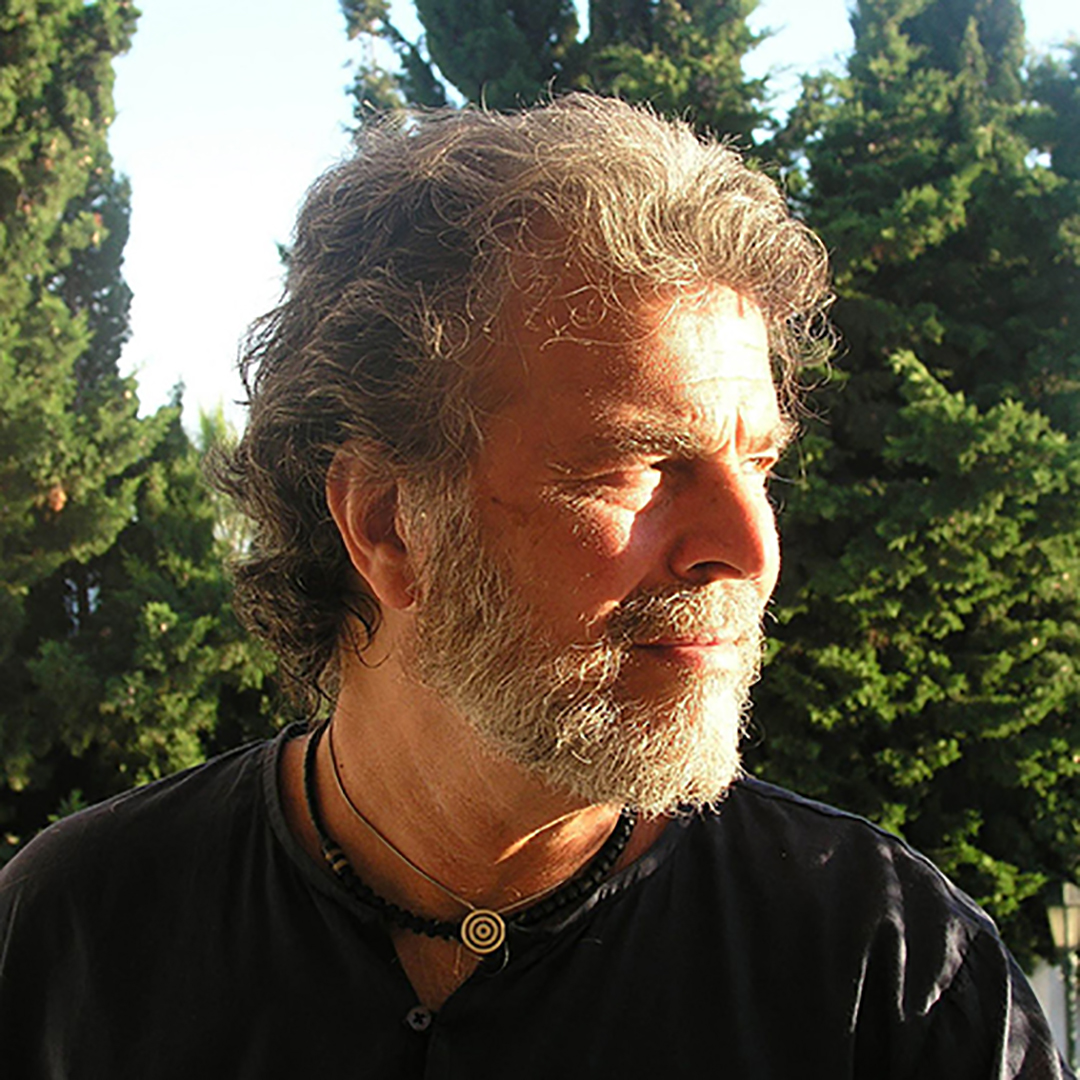
Robert Venosa

Robert Venosa (January 21, 1936 - August 9, 2011) was an American painter of fantastic realist and visionary paintings.

Venosa's work has been exhibited worldwide. Venosa also contributed film design (pre-sketches and conceptual design) for the movie Dune, Fire in the Sky, and the IMAX movie Race for Atlantis. His work has been featured in numerous publications - most notably OMNI magazine - and on a number of CD covers, including those of Santana, Kitaro and Cynic.

== Life and works ==
Venosa first studied under the painter Mati Klarwein in New York. Later, he moved to Europe and studied with one of the founders of the Vienna School of Fantastic Realism (German: Wiener Schule des Phantastischen Realismus), Ernst Fuchs in Vienna.

From these masters, he learned variations of a venerated painting technique developed in the mid-1400s, called the Misch Technique (Mischtechnik, after Max Doerner's 1921 book The Materials of the Artist and Their Use in Painting: With Notes on the Techniques of the Old Masters) which involves underpainting in water-soluble tempera with transparent oil paint glazes.

While living in Vienna, Venosa met his second wife, the Austrian painter Jutta Venosa (born Cwik), with whom he had three children: Marcus, Celene, and Christan. They moved to the coastal village of Cadaques, Spain, where he lived for seventeen years and befriended the surrealist painter Salvador Dalí. He later introduced H. R. Giger to Dalí.

In 1981 Robert Venosa met his third wife, the German painter, Martina Hoffmann. During their 30-year relationship they traveled the globe and taught their painting technique at such learning centers as Esalen, Omega, Naropa Institutes and the CIIS in the us as well as Skyros Institute in Greece and private workshops on Isla S'Arenella in Cadaques Spain as well as Boulder, Colorado. Et al.. Following the same processes as the classic Misch Technique, Venosa adapted by using oil and/or (casein versus egg tempera) underpainting.

Venosa died on August 9, 2011, after suffering from cancer for eight years.

== See also ==
- Society for the Art of Imagination
- Fantastic Realism School of art

== Related museums galleries collections ==
- Fantastic Art Centre
- Temporary Galerie in H.R. Giger Museum

== Bibliography ==
- 1978 - Robert Venosa: Manas Manna (Big "O" Publishing) ISBN 0-905664-02-7
- 1991 - Robert Venosa: Noospheres (Pomegranate Communications Inc, US) ISBN 0-87654-817-6
- 1999 - Robert Venosa: Illuminatus (with Terence McKenna, Ernst Fuchs, H. R. Giger, and Mati Klarwein) (Craftsman House) ISBN 90-5703-272-4
- 2006 - True Visions (Erik Davis and Pablo Echaurren) (Betty Books) ISBN 88-902372-0-1
- 2007 - Metamorphosis (beinArt) ISBN 978-0-9803231-0-8
