= List of Obscura band members =

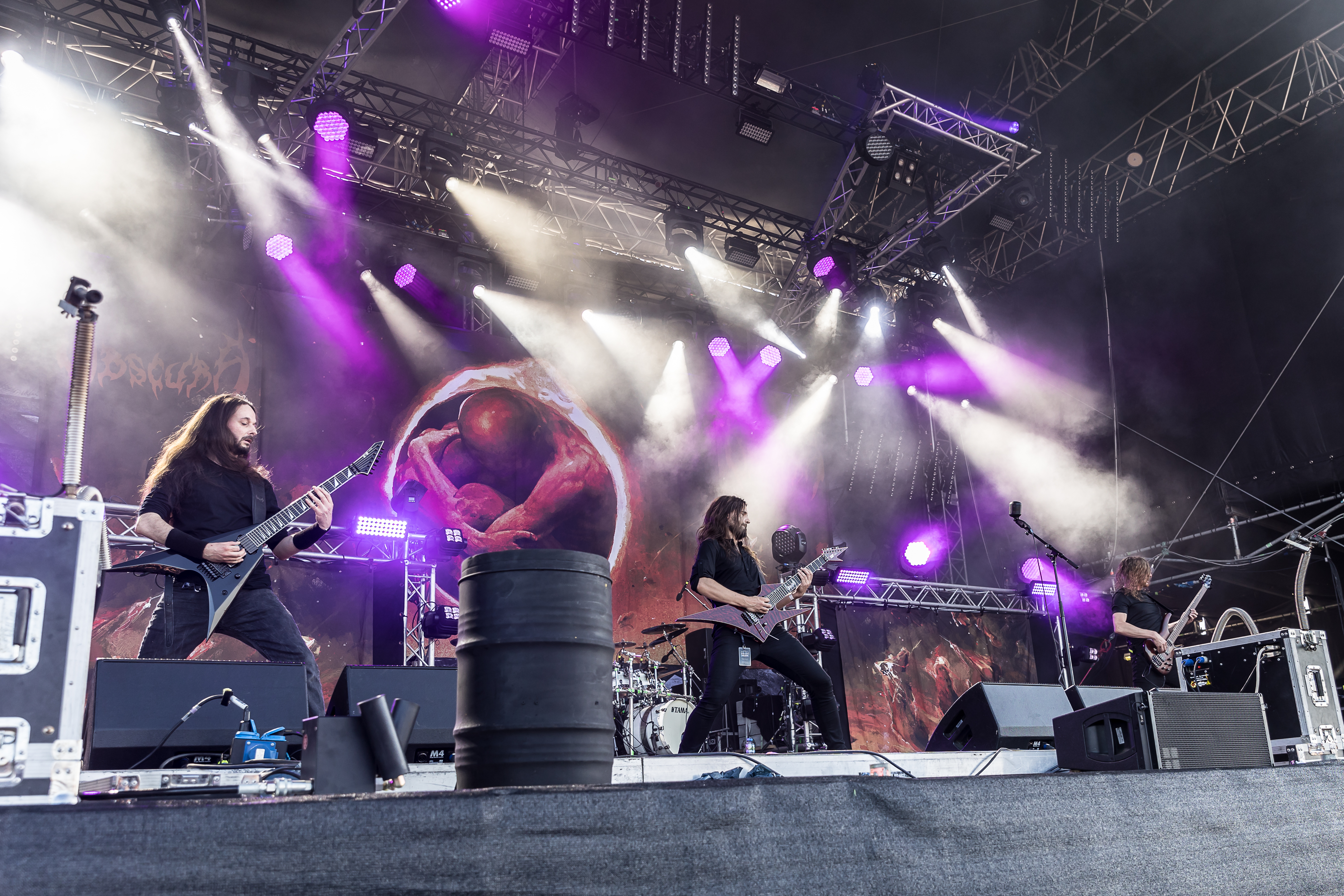
Obscura performing live in 2024.

Obscura are a German technical death metal band from Landshut. Formed in 2002, the group were initially known as Illegimitation and featured guitarist and bandleader Steffen Kummerer, vocalist and bassist Martin Ketzer, second guitarist Armin Seitz, and drummer Jonas Baumgartl. The group's current lineup includes 2024 additions Kevin Olasz (guitar), Robin Zielhorst (bass) and James Stewart (drums), although their touring lineup in 2025 has featured guitarist Vince Wilquin, bassist Hugo Doyon-Karout and drummer Clément Denys.

== History ==
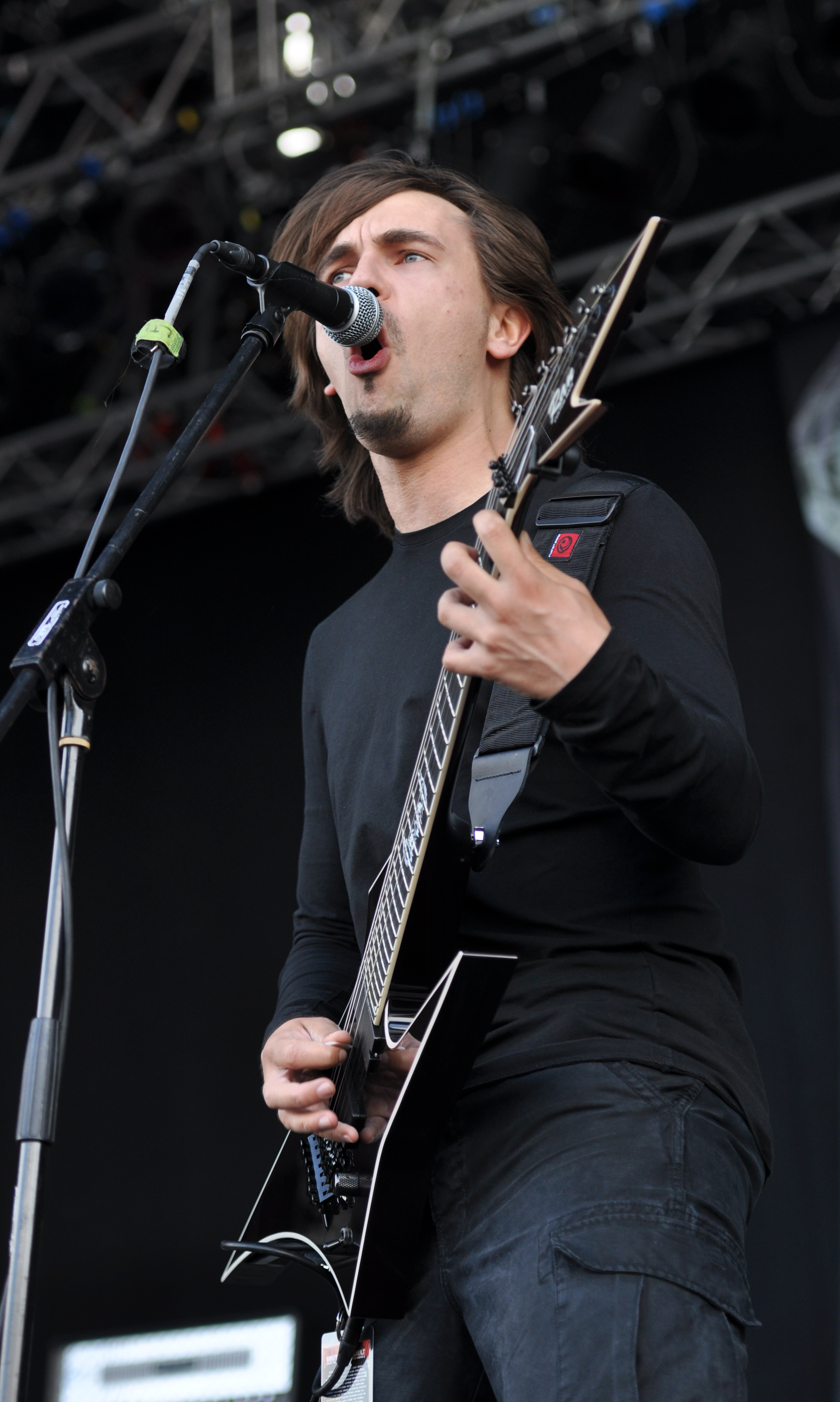
Steffen Kummerer has been the leader of Obscura since its formation in 2002.

=== 2002–2007 ===
16-year-old Steffen Kummerer formed Illegimitation in 2002, just "a few months after" buying his first guitar. The original lineup included Kummerer and Armin Seitz on guitars, Martin Ketzer on bass and vocals, and Jonas Baumgartl on drums and cello. The band recorded a self-titled demo in November 2003. Ketzer left in early 2004 due to the band's "manic rehearsing schedule", with Seitz following "a few weeks later" to focus on his education. Kummerer subsequently took over vocals and wrote the material for Retribution with Baumgartl ahead of recording in the summer. For the group's only show during this period, Ernst "Azmo" Wurdak was enlisted to play bass live.

Recording for Retribution took place in August 2004. Kummerer tried to enlist former Pestilence bassist Jeroen Paul Thesseling to play bass on the album, but due to scheduling conflicts was forced to record them himself. The band's name was changed to Obscura during the album's recording. After a brief hiatus while Kummerer focused on his recently formed second band Thulcandra, the band self-released Retribution in 2005, by which time guitarist Markus Lempsch and bassist Jonas Fischer had joined the lineup. Touring continued throughout 2006, before Lempsch announced his departure in January 2007 due to "scheduling conflicts and other obligations". By April, he had been replaced by Johannes Rennig. For a tour in September that year, Matthias "Seraph" Landes of Dark Fortress temporarily filled in for the temporarily unavailable Baumgartl.

=== 2007–2014 ===
After the September 2007 tour, Baumgartl left Obscura permanently, alongside bassist Jonas Fischer, with former Necrophagist drummer Hannes Grossmann taking over on drums. In December, it was announced that Jeroen Paul Thesseling had replaced Fischer as Obscura's bassist. In January 2008, guitarist Johannes Rennig was replaced by Christian Münzner, a former bandmate of Grossmann in Necrophagist.

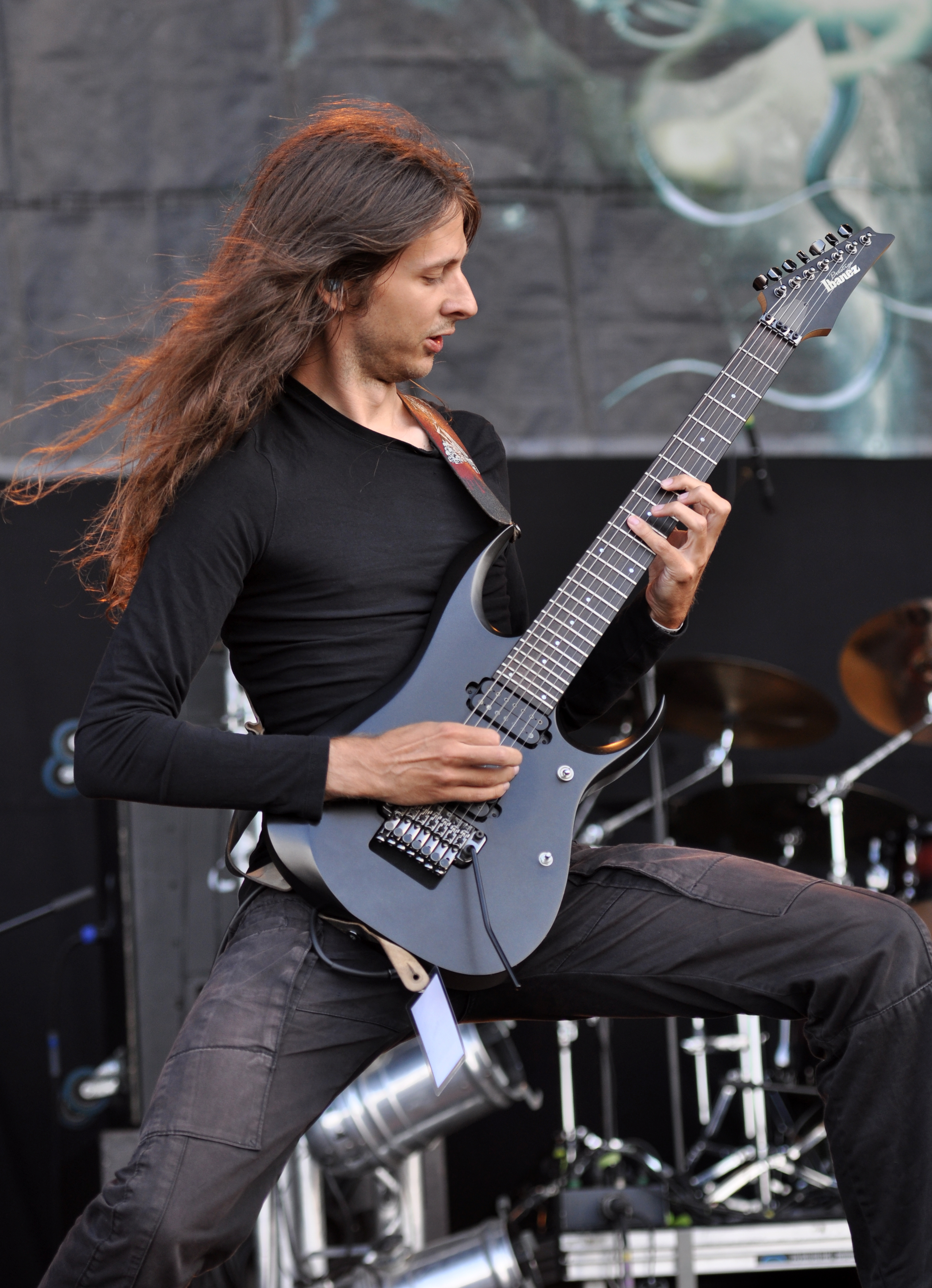
Christian Münzner was Obscura's second guitarist between 2008 and 2014, then again from 2020 to 2024.

With the new lineup of Kummerer, Münzner, Thesseling and Grossmann, Obscura signed with Relapse Records and released their second album Cosmogenesis in February 2009. For a European tour in October that year, Thesseling was replaced at most shows by Jacob Schmidt of Defeated Sanity. After rejoining Pestilence, Thesseling was also unavailable for a Japanese tour in June 2010, with prolific bassist Steve Di Giorgio filling in for him. The official lineup released Omnivium in March 2011, with Schmidt returning for shows around the same time in place of Thesseling. By July, Thesseling had officially left Obscura, citing "repetitive conflicting schedules". When Kummerer later claimed that the band had fired the bassist in January, Thesseling responded that he had been unable to tour consistently due to financial difficulties, leading to him quitting in April.

Linus Klausenitzer, who had filled in for Thesseling during recent tour dates, officially took over as Obscura's full-time bassist in September 2011. The new lineup made just three demo recordings featured on the 2012 Illegimitation compilation, before both Münzner and Grossmann left the band in July 2014 — the guitarist explained that his departure was mainly "to devote the biggest part of the time that I have to work on my own music and visions", while the drummer noted that "In the last two years it just became more and more obvious that the musical chemistry between band founder Steffen and me just wasn't right anymore", assuring that "It's not a personal issue, it's a musical one".

=== 2014–2024 ===
Obscura announced the replacements for Christian Münzner and Hannes Grossmann as Tom Geldschläger and Sebastian Lanser, respectively, in September 2014. The new lineup released Akróasis in February 2016. Prior to the album's release, the band unveiled Rafael Trujillo as their new guitarist in November 2015, following Geldschläger's departure in July. The new lineup issued the band's fifth album Diluvium in July 2018. During a tour towards the end of the year, Steffen Kummerer was unavailable for three shows after his passport and luggage were stolen, so members of support bands Beyond Creation (Simon Girard and Kevin Chartré), Exist (Max Phelps and Alex Weber) and Inferi (Stevie Boiser) stood in for the vocalist. In April 2020, Kummerer announced the dismissal of Trujillo, Klausenitzer and Lanser due to "musical differences".

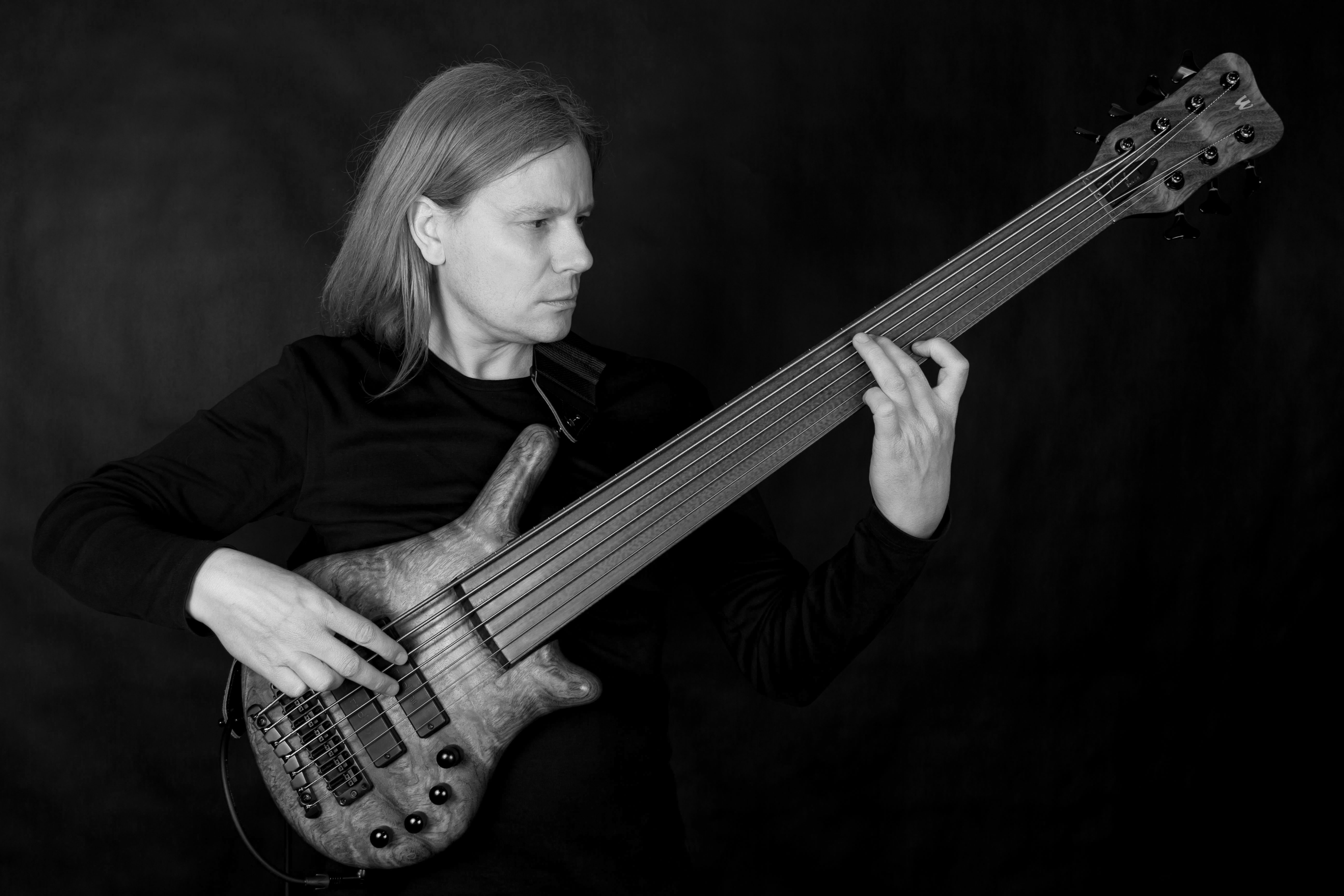
2007–2011 bassist Jeroen Paul Thesseling rejoined Obscura from 2020 to 2022.

Replacements for the departed band members were announced over the following month — a week after news of the change, bassist Jeroen Paul Thesseling returned to the band; in mid-May, David Diepold took over on drums; and at the end of the month, former guitarist Christian Münzner also rejoined the group. The new lineup released A Valediction on Nuclear Blast Records in November 2021. For shows early the next year in North America, Thesseling and Diepold were unavailable due to "visa issues", with Alex Weber and Gabe Seeber performing in their places. The regular members returned for European shows later in the year, but Thesseling had officially left by the end of the year. Weber and Seeber continued performing with Obscura during 2023 and 2024. A few shows in the summer of 2024 featured Ype Terwisscha van Scheltinga on bass.

=== Since 2024 ===
In August 2024, Christian Münzner announced his second departure from Obscura, which he credited to "creative differences". The next month, a new lineup of the band featuring guitarist Kevin Olasz, bassist Robin Zielhorst and drummer James Stewart was announced. A new album, A Sonication, was released in February 2025. Touring for the album has featured a lineup of Kummerer alongside guitarist Vince Wilquin, bassist Hugo Doyon-Karout and drummer Clément Denys in February. Since February 2025 the touring lineup features guitarist Vince Wilquin, bassist Robin Zielhorst and drummer Clément Denys along Steffen Kummerer.

== Members ==
=== Current ===
Image	Name	Years active	Instruments	Release contributions
	Steffen Kummerer	2002–present	rhythm guitar; vocals (since 2004); lead guitar (2004); bass (2004)	all Obscura releases
	Kevin Olasz	2024–present	lead guitar	A Sonication (2025)
	James Stewart	2024–present	drums	A Sonication (2025)
	Robin Zielhorst	2024–present	bass	A Sonication (2025)

=== Former ===
Image	Name	Years active	Instruments	Release contributions
	Jonas Baumgartl	2002–2007	drums; cello	Illegimitation demo (2003); Retribution (2005); Illegimitation (2012); Diluvium (2018) — guest appearance on one track
	Martin Ketzer	2002–2004	bass; lead vocals	Illegimitation demo (2003)
	Armin Seitz	2002–2004	lead guitar	Illegimitation demo (2003)
	Jonas Fischer	2005–2007	bass	Retribution reissue (2010) – two bonus tracks; Illegimitation (2012) – 2006 Cosmogenesis pre-production demos only
	Markus Lempsch	2005–2007	guitar; backing vocals	Retribution reissue (2010) – two bonus tracks; Illegimitation (2012) – 2006 Cosmogenesis pre-production demos only
	Johannes Rennig	2007–2008	lead guitar	none
	Hannes Grossmann	2007–2014	drums	Cosmogenesis (2009); Omnivium (2011); Illegimitation (2012) – 2011 Woodshed Studio Sessions only
	Jeroen Paul Thesseling	2007–2011; 2020–2022	bass	Cosmogenesis (2009); Omnivium (2011); A Valediction (2021)
	Christian Münzner	2008–2014; 2020–2024	lead guitar	Cosmogenesis (2009); Omnivium (2011); Illegimitation (2012) – 2011 Woodshed Studio Sessions only; A Valediction (2021); A Celebration I: Live in North America (2023)
	Linus Klausenitzer	2011–2020	bass	Illegimitation (2012) – 2011 Woodshed Studio Sessions only; Akróasis (2016); Diluvium (2018)
	Sebastian Lanser	2014–2020	drums	Akróasis (2016); Diluvium (2018)
	Tom Geldschläger	2014–2015	lead guitar	Akróasis (2016)
	Rafael Trujillo	2015–2020	lead guitar	Diluvium (2018)
	David Diepold	2020–2024	drums	A Valediction (2021); A Celebration I: Live in North America (2023)

=== Touring ===
Image	Name	Years active	Instruments	Details
	Ernst "Azmo" Wurdak	2004	bass	Following the departure of Martin Ketzer, Wurdak filled in for the band's show at Walpurgis Metal Days IV.
	Matthias "Seraph" Landes	2007	drums	Landes filled in for Jonas Baumgartl, who was unavailable, for a European tour in September 2007.
	Jacob Schmidt	2009; 2011	bass	Schmidt filled in for regular bassist Jeroen Paul Thesseling at shows in October 2009 and early 2011.
	Steve Di Giorgio	2010	bass	Di Giorgio filled in for Thesseling, who was touring with Pestilence, for a Japanese tour in June 2010.
	Alex Rüdinger	2015	drums	Rüdinger was set to fill in for the injured Sebastian Lanser on a summer 2015 tour, but the band pulled out.
	Alex Weber	2018; 2022; 2023–2024	bass	Weber substituted for regular bassist Thesseling at shows between 2022 and 2024.
	Gabe Seeber	2022–2024	drums	Seeber filled in for regular drummer David Diepold during several tours during 2022, 2023 and 2024.
	Ype Terwisscha van Scheltinga	2024	bass	van Scheltinga took over from Robin Zielhorst, playing bass at the band's three festival performances in August 2024.
	Vince Wilquin	2025	lead guitar	Wilquin and Denys have been touring with Obscura since early 2025 to promote A Sonication. Hugo Doyon-Karout stepped in for a European tour in February 2025 only.
	Hugo Doyon-Karout	2025	bass	Wilquin and Denys have been touring with Obscura since early 2025 to promote A Sonication. Hugo Doyon-Karout stepped in for a European tour in February 2025 only.
	Clément Denys	2025	drums	Wilquin and Denys have been touring with Obscura since early 2025 to promote A Sonication. Hugo Doyon-Karout stepped in for a European tour in February 2025 only.

== Lineups ==
Period	Members	Releases
2002–early 2004 (as Illegimitation)	Steffen Kummerer — rhythm guitar, backing vocals; Jonas Baumgartl — drums, cello; Martin Ketzer — bass, vocals; Armin Seitz — lead guitar	Illegimitation demo (2003)
April/May 2004 (as Illegimitation)	Steffen Kummerer — rhythm guitar; Jonas Baumgartl — drums, cello; Martin Ketzer — vocals; Armin Seitz — lead guitar; Ernst "Azmo" Wurdak — bass (touring)	none
Summer 2004	Steffen Kummerer — guitars, vocals, bass; Jonas Baumgartl — drums, cello; Stephan Bergbauer — guitars	Retribution (2005)
2005–January 2007	Steffen Kummerer — lead vocals, rhythm guitar; Jonas Baumgartl — drums, cello; Markus Lempsch — lead guitar, backing vocals; Jonas Fischer — bass	Retribution reissue (2010) — two bonus tracks; Illegimitation (2012) — three tracks only
April–September 2007	Steffen Kummerer — vocals, rhythm guitar; Jonas Baumgartl — drums, cello; Jonas Fischer — bass; Johannes Rennig — lead guitar	none
September 2007	Steffen Kummerer — vocals, rhythm guitar; Johannes Rennig — lead guitar; Matthias "Seraph" Landes — drums (touring)	none
October–December 2007	Steffen Kummerer — vocals, rhythm guitar; Johannes Rennig — lead guitar; Hannes Grossmann — drums	none
December 2007–January 2008	Steffen Kummerer — vocals, rhythm guitar; Johannes Rennig — lead guitar; Hannes Grossmann — drums; Jeroen Paul Thesseling — bass	none
January 2008–July 2011	Steffen Kummerer — vocals, rhythm guitar; Hannes Grossmann — drums; Jeroen Paul Thesseling — bass; Christian Münzner — lead guitar	Cosmogenesis (2009); Omnivium (2011)
September 2011–July 2014	Steffen Kummerer — vocals, rhythm guitar; Hannes Grossmann — drums; Christian Münzner — lead guitar; Linus Klausenitzer — bass	Illegimitation (2012) — three tracks only
September 2014–July 2015	Steffen Kummerer — vocals, rhythm guitar; Linus Klausenitzer — bass; Sebastian Lanser — drums; Tom Geldschläger — lead guitar	Akróasis (2016)
November 2015–April 2020	Steffen Kummerer — vocals, rhythm guitar; Linus Klausenitzer — bass; Sebastian Lanser — drums; Rafael Trujillo — lead guitar	Diluvium (2018)
May 2020–late 2022	Steffen Kummerer — vocals, rhythm guitar; Jeroen Paul Thesseling — bass; Christian Münzner — lead guitar; David Diepold — drums	A Valediction (2021); A Celebration I: Live in North America (2023) — select tracks
2023–2024	Steffen Kummerer — vocals, rhythm guitar; Christian Münzner — lead guitar; Alex Weber — bass (touring); Gabe Seeber — drums (touring)	A Celebration I: Live in North America (2023) — select tracks
August 2024	Steffen Kummerer — vocals, rhythm guitar; Kevin Olasz — lead guitar; James Stewart — drums; Ype Terwisscha van Scheltinga — bass (touring)	none
September 2024– present	Steffen Kummerer — vocals, rhythm guitar; Kevin Olasz — lead guitar; James Stewart — drums; Robin Zielhorst — bass	A Sonication (2025)
