= Epitaph (Necrophagist album) =

Studio album by Necrophagist
- Released: 3 August 2004
- Recorded: "The Depth of Torment", Baden-Baden (guitars); "The Iguana Studios", March-Hugstetten (drums, vocals); "Aexxys-Art", Schwandorf (bass)
- Genre: Technical death metal
- Length: 32:56
- Label: Relapse
- Producer: Muhammed Suiçmez

Necrophagist chronology
Onset of Putrefaction (1999)	Epitaph (2004)

Professional ratings
Review scores
Source	Rating
Allmusic	4/5 stars
PopMatters	(favorable)
Ultimate Guitar	9.4 stars on a 10 point scale
Metal Storm	10/10 stars

Epitaph is the second and final studio album by German death metal band Necrophagist released by Relapse Records on August 3, 2004. Unlike on Onset of Putrefaction, guitarist and vocalist Muhammed Suiçmez recorded the album alongside a full band instead of recording it by himself. Though mostly uncredited, guitarist Christian Münzner, who later left the band and joined Obscura, claimed he wrote at least half of the lead guitar parts as well as several basslines on the album.

== Background and recording ==
Writing for the album began in 2002, with Muhammed Suiçmez composing the tracks initially in Power Tab Editor, and eventually in Guitar Pro; newcomer lead guitarist Christian Münzner composing some of the solos ("the solo in Stabwound, 2nd one in Stillborn, the ones in Epitaph and Seven, the 2 trade offs with Muhammed in Only Ash and the first solo in Symbiotic"), half of the track "Symbiotic in Theory" and a portion of the basslines, for which he took influence from Greg Howe.

Recording took place in three locations simultaneously: Hannes Grossmann recorded his drum tracks in Studio Iguana in March with Christoph Brandes, Stephan Fimmers recorded his bass in his own home studio in Schwandorf, while Münzner and Suiçmez recorded guitars in a makeshift studio in a school's basement in Baden-Baden; scheduling forced Münzner to drop out from recording rhythm guitars on three tracks, which were fully played by Suiçmez. As Suiçmez wanted to emphasize the compositional quality of the songs, the band relied heavily on punch-ins to get the accuracy they wanted.

== Music ==
The album makes use of neoclassical guitar playing. The genres are technical death metal and brutal death metal.

== Impact ==
In 2013, the staff of Loudwire included the main riff from "Stabwound" in their list of "the 10 Best Metal Riffs of the 2000s", calling the track the "posterchild" for brutal death metal. He further wrote: "Necrophagist weren't the first techdeath band on the scene, but legions of guitar players have followed suit aping the style laid down here."

== Track listing ==
All songs written by Muhammed Suiçmez except where noted.

No.	Title	Length
1.	"Stabwound"	2:48
2.	"The Stillborn One"	4:24
3.	"Ignominious & Pale"	4:01
4.	"Diminished to B"	4:59
5.	"Epitaph"	4:15
6.	"Only Ash Remains"	4:11
7.	"Seven"	3:44
8.	"Symbiotic in Theory" (Münzner, Suiçmez)	4:35
Total length:		32:56

== Personnel ==
Necrophagist

- Muhammed Suiçmez – vocals, lead and rhythm guitars
- Christian Münzner – lead guitar
- Stephan Fimmers – bass guitar
- Hannes Grossmann – drums

Additional personnel

- Christoph Brandes – drum and vocal recording
- Bob Katz – mastering
