= Diluvium (album) =

Studio album by Obscura
- Released: 13 July 2018
- Recorded: October – November 2017
- Studio: Various: Woodshed Studios (Landshut, Germany); Lanser Studio (Salzburg, Austria)
- Genres: Technical death metal; progressive metal
- Length: 51:32
- Label: Relapse
- Producers: V. Santura; Obscura

Obscura chronology
Akróasis (2016)	Diluvium (2018)	A Valediction (2021)

Singles from Diluvium
- 1. "Diluvium" Released: 8 May 2018; 2. "Emergent Evolution" Released: 13 June 2018; 3. "Ethereal Skies" Released: 2 July 2018; 4. "Mortification of the Vulgar Sun" Released: 13 July 2018

Professional ratings
Review scores
Source	Rating
Decibel	8/10 stars
Exclaim!	8/10
Metal Hammer	4/5 stars
Metal Injection	7/10
MetalSucks	4.5/5 stars
NME	4/5 stars
Ultimate Guitar Archive	7/10

Diluvium is the fifth studio album by German technical death metal band Obscura, released on 13 July 2018 via Relapse. Diluvium is also marked as the last album of the band's four-album concept series, along with Cosmogenesis (2009), Omnivium (2011) and Akróasis (2016).

== Track listing ==
All lyrics are written by Steffen Kummerer.

No.	Title	Music	Length
1.	"Clandestine Stars"	Trujillo; Klausenitzer; Lanser	3:38
2.	"Emergent Evolution"	Kummerer	4:52
3.	"Diluvium"	Trujillo; Lanser	5:02
4.	"Mortification of the Vulgar Sun"	Trujillo; Klausenitzer; Lanser	6:09
5.	"Ethereal Skies"	Trujillo; Lanser	5:18
6.	"Convergence"	Kummerer	4:04
7.	"Ekpyrosis"	Kummerer; Trujillo; Klausenitzer; Lanser	5:23
8.	"The Seventh Aeon"	Kummerer	5:17
9.	"The Conjuration"	Kummerer; Klausenitzer	5:33
10.	"An Epilogue to Infinity"	Trujillo; Klausenitzer; Lanser	6:16
Total length:			51:32

CD & digital Bonus Track
No.	Title	Music	Length
11.	"A Last Farewell" (instrumental)	Klausenitzer	2:26
Total length:			53:58

== Personnel ==
Obscura

- Steffen Kummerer – vocals, rhythm guitar
- Rafael Trujillo – lead guitar, string arrangements (track 5)
- Linus Klausenitzer – bass
- Sebastian Lanser – drums

Additional musicians

- Jonas Baumgartl – cello (track 5)
- Ulf Klausenitzer – violin (track 5)
- V. Santura – string arrangements (track 5)

Production and design

- V. Santura – production, engineering, mixing, mastering
- Obscura – production, music arrangement
- Norwin Palme – assistant engineering (drums)
- Orion Landau – artwork
- Christian Weiss – photography
- Sylvia Makris – photography

== Charts ==
Chart (2018)	Peak position
US Heatseekers Albums (Billboard)	3
US Independent Albums (Billboard)	18
US Indie Store Album Sales (Billboard)	24
German Albums (Offizielle Top 100)	58
Swiss Albums (Schweizer Hitparade)	93
