= Kaoteon =

Dutch band

- Kaoteon members (Anthony Kaoteon)

Background information
- Origin: Beirut, Lebanon
- Genres: Black metal, death metal, blackened death metal
- Years active: 1998–present
- Labels: Unsung Heroes Records; Osmose Productions; Believe
- Members: Anthony Kaoteon (guitarist/composer)
- Website: www.instagram.com/kaoteon

Kaoteon is an extreme metal band from Lebanon, who changed their base due to migration to Dubai, and currently based in the Netherlands, officially formed in 1998 by Anthony Kaoteon.

== Biography ==
Kaoteon is an extreme metal band with origins in Lebanon. The band aims to amplify humanitarian international law with themes of Justice, Equality and Feedom. Kaoteon was formed in war torn Beirut as a one-man band in 1998 by Anthony Kaoteon under the name Chaotaeon (from the merger of "chaotic" and "aeon"). They changed their name after an incident with the authorities in which they got arrested. The police thought that "Chaotaeon" was the translation of "devils" from Arabic. The members were detained for days during a heavy investigation which led to false accusations that the band is Satanic.

Kaoteon released Damnatio Memoriae on 23 February 2018 that featured Frederick Widigs on drums (Marduk) and Linus Klausenitzer on bass (Obscura). On 11 June, Kaoteon were awarded the "Global Metal" award at the 2018 Metal Hammer Golden Gods Awards. Shortly after, Anthony started working on a follow-up album that was released on 17 January 2020 featuring Adrian Erlandsson on drums (At the Gates) and Linus Klausenitzer on bass (Obscura). Kaoteon's composer 'Anthony' released "Neither God Nor Master" which was named as the best album of the year 2022 in several charts, followed by Death Trap in 2024 that features the Map of Gaza on the artwork specifically highlighting the Genocide taking place in Palestine.

Kaoteon is an extreme metal band with origins in Lebanon, founded in war-torn Beirut in 1998 by Anthony Kaoteon under the name Chaotaeon (a fusion of “chaotic” and aeon). The band changed its name after an arrest incident in which police mistakenly believed “Chaotaeon” meant “devils” in Arabic; members were detained and falsely accused of Satanism. Kaoteon gained international attention with Damnatio Memoriae (2018), featuring Frederick Widigs on drums (Marduk) and Linus Klausenitzer on bass (Obscura), and received the Global Metal Award at the 2018 Metal Hammer Golden Gods Awards. A self-titled follow-up (2020) included Adrian Erlandsson on drums (At the Gates) and Klausenitzer again on bass.

After Walid Wolflust’s departure in 2020, Anthony continued Kaoteon as a solo project in the Netherlands, deepening its political and philosophical edge. In 2022 he released Neither God Nor Master, widely acclaimed as one of the year’s best metal albums for its anarchic rejection of divine and political authority.

The 2024 EP Death Trap extended that vision, featuring Gaza on its cover art as a direct reflection on the humanitarian catastrophe in Palestine, consolidating Kaoteon’s reputation for turning lived experience, social defiance, and regional consciousness into uncompromising extreme metal.

== Discography ==
Studio albums

- Provenance of Hatred – 2003 by Unsung Heroes Records (USA), Extreminal Records (Turkey) and Ketzer Records (Russia) on CD and by Diabolical Masquerade (Netherlands) as a tape
- Veni Vidi Vomui – 2011 by Osmose Productions
- Damnatio Memoriae – 2018
- Kaoteon – 2020
- Neither God Nor Master – 2022
- Death Trap EP – 2024

Singles

- "Anthem of the Dead" – 2008
- "The Hunt for Life" – 2022

== Awards ==
- "Global Metal" award by Metal Hammer Golden Gods Awards 2018

== Members ==
=== Current members ===
- Anthony Kaoteon – guitarist/composer/founder (bass on demos and Veni Vidi Vomui) (1998–present)

=== Former members ===
- Walid WolfLust – all vocals/lyrics (2001–2020)
- Ziad Alam – drums (2006–2014)
- Riad Hajjar – drums (2003–2004)
- Sami Khawam – bass (2001–2002)
- Bernard Moussalli – guitars (2001)
- Roger Moussalli – drums (2001)
- Georges Daou – guitars (2000)

=== Session members ===
- Terry Stooker – vocals on Neither God Nor Master (2022)
- Adrian Erlandsson – drums on Kaoteon (2020) and Neither God Nor Master (2022)
- Linus Klausenitzer – bass on Damnatio Memoriae (2018), Kaoteon (2020) and The Hunt For Life (2022)
- Fredrik Widigs – drums on Damnatio Memoriae (2018)
