= A Sonication =

Studio album by Obscura
- Released: 7 February 2025
- Recorded: 2024
- Studio: Studio Fredman
- Genres: Progressive death metal; technical death metal
- Length: 39:06
- Label: Nuclear Blast
- Producers: Fredrik Nordström, Steffen Kummerer

Obscura chronology
| A Valediction (2021) | A Sonication (2025) |

Singles from A Sonication
- 1. "Silver Linings" Released: 20 November 2024; 2. "Evenfall" Released: 8 January 2025

Professional ratings
Review scores
| Source | Rating |
|---|---|
| Blabbermouth.net | 8/10 |
| Metal Storm | 7.2/10 |
| Metal Underground.com | 4.5/5 |
| New Noise Magazine | 3/5 |

A Sonication is the seventh studio album by German technical death metal band Obscura. It was released by the music label Nuclear Blast on 7 February 2025.

== Background ==
The album was written and recorded in Studio Fredman in Gothenburg, Sweden, and produced by Fredrik Nordström and Steffen Kummerer. Music videos for the tracks "Evenfall", "Silver Linings", "In Solitude", "The Sun Eater", and "The Prolonging" have been released.

== Touring ==
The band confirmed a 23-date European headlining tour with support bands Rings Of Saturn and Gorod to embark in February 2025. In April and May 2025, Obscura headlined the annual North American festival tour called “Shred Fest”, supported by US American groups Atheist, Origin, Decrepit Birth and French progressive act Fractal Universe. With 34 concerts, the trek covered the United States and Canada extensively. In June the band announced the third leg of their “A Sonication World Tour” to cover Eastern and Southern Europe in September and October 2025. Support bands have been confirmed with Greek thrash band Suicidal Angels, Italian death metal group Hideous Divinity and veteran Italian progressive death/thrash act Sadist. In October the band announced their return to Japan with a 5 dates long tour called "The Sun Eater", as part of their world tour. Supporting acts are US American progressive death metal band Fallujah, and French modern metal act Dvrk. In December the band announced their return to the United States with the "Stardust" tour, lasting 23 concerts, and being part of the ongoing "A Sonication World Tour", supported by US American groups Allegaeon, and Cognitive, as well as Dutch sci-fi thrash metal band Cryptosis. Obscura has been confirmed for Europes biggest heavy metal festival Hellfest, located in France, and Asias largest rock and metal fest Hammersonic Fest, located in Indonesia. In January 2026, the band announced a four week long Asian tour named "The Sun Eater // Asia 2026", to cover India, Japan, China, South Korea, Armenia, Georgia, Thailand, Singapore, Vietnam, Indonesia, Taiwan, Mongolia and the United Arab Emirates. Supports are French modern metal band Dvrk, and for selected Japanese dates US progressive metal band Fallujah. On January 20th, the band announced an 11-date lasting tour in Australia and New Zealand, headlining the annual touring festival Shred Fest featuring support acts Fallujah, Ashen and Anoxia.

== Track listing ==
All tracks are written by Steffen Kummerer.

A Sonication track listing
| No. | Title | Length |
|---|---|---|
| 1. | "Silver Linings" | 4:41 |
| 2. | "Evenfall" | 5:27 |
| 3. | "In Solitude" | 3:48 |
| 4. | "The Prolonging" | 2:08 |
| 5. | "Beyond the Seventh Sun" (Instrumental) | 4:49 |
| 6. | "Stardust" | 6:32 |
| 7. | "The Sun Eater" | 4:09 |
| 8. | "A Sonication" | 7:32 |

== Personnel ==
Obscura

- Steffen Kummerer – vocals, rhythm guitar
- Kevin Olasz – lead guitar
- Robin Zielhorst – bass
- James Stewart – drums

Guests

- Sami Yli-Sirniö – guitar solo (track 8)
- Christian Münzner – songwriting (tracks 4 & 7, uncredited)

Additional personnel

- Fredrik Nordström – production
- Eliran Kantor – artwork
- Grzegorz Gołębiowski – photography
