= Christian Münzner =

German guitarist (born 1981)

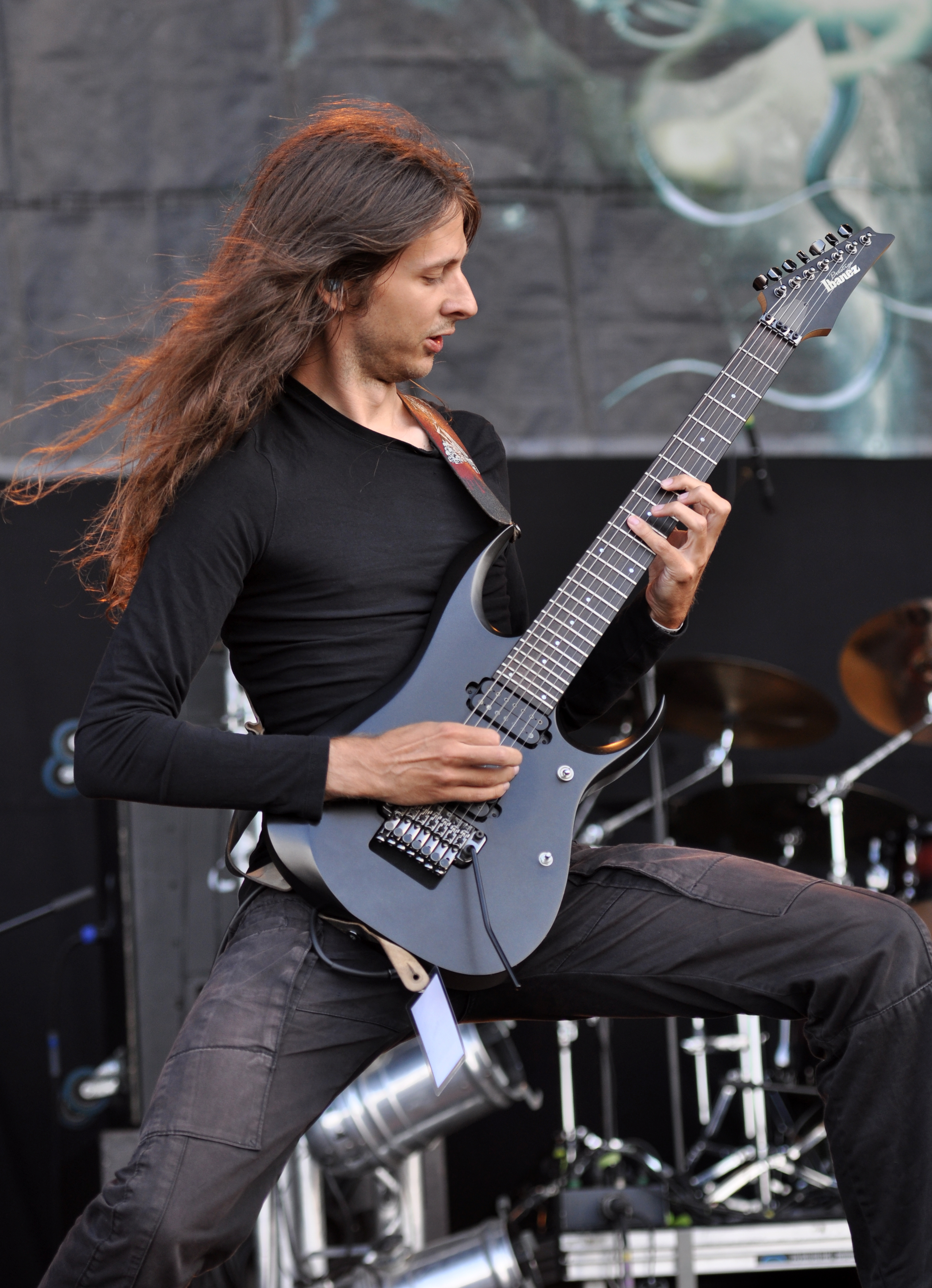
- Münzner performing in 2013

Background information
- Born: 21 August 1981 (age 45)
- Origin: Germany
- Genres: Death metal, technical death metal, progressive metal, thrash metal, power metal, neoclassical metal
- Instrument: Guitar
- Member of: Retromorphosis, Eternity's End
- Formerly of: Necrophagist, Obscura, Defeated Sanity, Spawn of Possession, Alkaloid, Paradox

Christian Münzner (born 21 August 1981) is a German guitarist who played for the bands Obscura and Alkaloid. He is also known for playing for the technical death metal band Necrophagist from 2002 until 2006, appearing on their 2004 release Epitaph. As well as Necrophagist, Münzner played in Defeated Sanity from 1999 to 2002 and Obscura from 2008 to 2014, after which he left to co-found the extreme progressive metal supergroup Alkaloid. He rejoined Obscura in 2020 and left again in 2024. At the end of 2024, he joined Eschaton.

In addition to being a prolific solo artist who has released three solo albums, Münzner is also a member of Ron Jarzombek's musical venture Terrestrial Exiled and was featured on Hannes Grossmann's solo album. Since 2011 he has focal dystonia in his left hand.

Münzner is known for drawing huge influences from classical music, particularly Johann Sebastian Bach.

== Early life ==
Münzner began playing guitar aged 11, began playing his first live shows when he was just 12, and soon thereafter was introduced to the work of Yngwie Malmsteen, Steve Vai, Dream Theater, and Paul Gilbert. After seeing Gilbert perform, he developed a habit of practicing rigorously for 6–8 hours a day. In 2001 he attended the Munich Guitar Institute and studied with Wolfgang Zenk and Uli Wiedenhorn, before graduating in 2002.

== Influences and style ==
His playing style is largely based on neo-classical scales, such as diminished, phrygian, harmonic minor. He cites many neoclassical guitar players as major influences, such as Tony MacAlpine, Jason Becker who inspired his sweep picking technique, Marty Friedman, Yngwie Malmsteen, Vinnie Moore, and John Petrucci, who also inspired his alternate picking technique.

In regards to guitar technique, he says:

"Phrasing is what makes the big difference between just mindless noodling and a great guitar solo in my opinion. Think more about which notes you play and when you play them, and then just use your chops to play the notes you wanna play. Don't think now I sweep, now I pick, now I tap, etc. Think of musical phrases and use speed to add intensity. Intensity is essential for good music in general to me."

He wrote half the leads on Necrophagist's Epitaph, although he believes that "his phrasing wasn't as good as now as I tended to overplay".

He's also a fan of symmetric and exotic scales, and he openly endorses using his knowledge of music theory when writing: "It helps me a lot to see and navigate through the fret-board a lot faster. [...] I think knowing all the theory also made me learn every other aspect of guitar a lot faster."

== Music ==
=== Necrophagist ===
Münzner joined Necrophagist in 2002, and wrote the solos to the Epitaph album, including songs like "Stabwound" and the title track. The album garnered critical acclaim amongst fans and critics alike for the complexity of the music and its substantive neoclassical influences. Münzner's tenure at Necrophagist lasted only four years, and in 2006 he left the band. However, he later stated that there was a lot of tension within the band, "which sucked out the fun of guitar playing", which prompted him to leave. In regards to his relationship with Muhammed and the contribution he made to the record, Münzner states:

"I know nothing about what this guy is up to. Last time I spoke to him was more than 5 and a half years ago. We met briefly at a festival where both Necro and Obscura played 2 years ago, but we didn't speak apart from a brief hello. We didn't really part ways on the best terms... It kinda pisses me off though that so many people think that he wrote my leads on Epitaph, which is just bullshit."

After leaving the band, Necrophagist announced that Münzner's departure was due to scheduling conflicts.

=== Obscura ===
Shortly after leaving Necrophagist, Münzner joined Steffen Kummerer, Jeroen Paul Thesseling and Hannes Grossmann in Obscura, recording his first album with them, Cosmogenesis, in 2009. Two years later, he recorded the third Obscura record, Omnivium, in 2011. Throughout his tenure, the band played more than 200 live shows. Münzner stated that a large reason for his departure from Necrophagist and eagerness to join Obscura was because of the freedom afforded to him by this band, particularly Steffen Kummerer who welcomed his contributions.

When writing for Obscura, Münzner stated that his main contributions were not so much in terms of songwriting, but generating riffs and solos for the band, which were then arranged by Grossmann. Apart from the song "Universe Momentum", Münzner said that he had not written any songs on his own, but relied on writing riffs and solos which were then organized into songs.

He appeared in the music video for the single "Anticosmic Overload".

During his time with Obscura, Münzner began developing focal dystonia, which prohibited some of his playing and made touring exhaustive. Citing Obscura's extreme technicality and touring as a hindrance to this disease, Münzner decided to leave the band prior to the release of their fourth record.

"My decision to step down from my position as the lead guitar player in Obscura after more than 6 years was not an easy one, but even though it may come unexpected for the majority of fans...I am still dealing with a neurologic condition in my fretting hand called Focal Dystonia, which almost took the ability to play guitar away from me completely by late 2011/early 2012. Even though I regained most of my chops by now through re-training and Botox therapy, the condition is still there and I have to be very careful not to relapse and undo my progress by putting too much strain on my hand, which is why touring several months on an album cycle with material that brings me to the edge of my technical ability every night is not an option for me anymore in the near future."

Münzner rejoined Obscura in 2020, released A Valediction with them and left once more in 2024, citing "creative differences when it came to the next album".

=== Alkaloid ===
After leaving Obscura, Münzner joined Morean, Danny Tunker, Linus Klausenitzer and Hannes Grossmann as the third guitarist, forming the progressive metal supergroup Alkaloid in 2014, and wrote two songs for their debut album, The Malkuth Grimoire. Münzner left the band in 2024.

== Focal dystonia ==
After recording the Obscura album Omnivium in 2011, Münzner was diagnosed with focal dystonia. Despite having had this disorder for several years throughout his career, physicians couldn't characterize the disease. Münzner describes the disorder as impairing the coordination between both his index and middle fingers, making the technical demands of his music impossible, forcing him to change his fingering and technique.

"Since the index finger is mostly on the strings when playing guitar, my middle finger cramps back into the hand and I can't use it, and the most simple trill functions between the first 2 fingers became impossible and un-doable for me. This is why I now tap a lot more with more fingers of my right hand and I use more slides with the index finger and the pinky...I still live in constant fear that it starts affecting other fingers...I have to reduce my performance and practice amount to a healthy degree"

Despite the disease, Münzner still wrote music and toured with Obscura until his departure from the band.

== Equipment ==
Guitars

- Ibanez RGT6EXFX
- Ibanez JEM77BFP
- Ibanez XPT707 seven string
- Ibanez JEM77V
- Ibanez RGD2127Z-ISH 7 string
- Ibanez RGA7 7 string

Amplifiers

- ENGL E 530 preamp
- ENGL 840/50 poweramp

Guitar picks

- Dunlop Jazz III

Effects

- TC Electronic G Major multi-effects unit
- Fractal Audio Axe FX II

== Discography ==
- Defeated Sanity – Promo (2000)
- Defeated Sanity – Talk Evolution/The Parasite (2001)
- Necrophagist – Epitaph (2004)
- Obscura – Cosmogenesis (2009)
- Terrestrial Exiled – Duodecimal Levorotation Single (2011)
- Obscura – Omnivium (2011)
- Timewarp (solo album) (2011)
- Spawn of Possession – Incurso (2012)
- Paradox – Tales of the Weird (2012)
- Beyond The Wall of Sleep (solo album) (2014)
- Alkaloid – The Malkuth Grimoire (2015)
- Eternity's End – The Fire Within (2016)
- Alkaloid – Liquid Anatomy (2018)
- Eternity's End – Unyielding (2019)
- Path of the Hero (solo album) (2020)
- Obscura – A Valediction (2021)
- Eternity's End – Embers of War (2021)
- Alkaloid – Numen (2023)
- Retromorphosis - Psalmus Mortis (2025)
- Eschaton - Techtalitarion (2025)
- Fayence Dream – Repose of the Soul (2025)
- Eternity’s End - TITANBLOOD (2026)
