= Hannes Grossmann =

German drummer (born 1982)

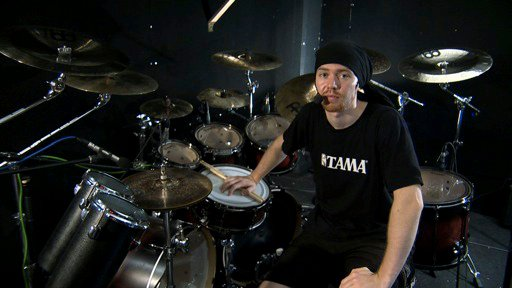
- Grossmann in 2010

Background information
- Born: 8 September 1982 (age 44); Bayreuth, Germany
- Genres: Technical death metal, death metal, progressive metal
- Occupations: Musician, songwriter, drum instructor
- Instruments: Drums, percussion, guitar, piano
- Years active: 2003–present
- Label: Season of Mist
- Member of: Triptykon, Alkaloid
- Formerly of: Necrophagist, Obscura, Hate Eternal, Blotted Science
- Website: www.hannesgrossmann.com

Hannes Grossmann (born 8 September 1982) is a German drummer who plays for the German progressive band Alkaloid. He was also the drummer during Necrophagist's Epitaph era and played with Obscura.

== Biography ==
=== Early life ===
Hannes Grossmann was born on 8 September 1982 in Bayreuth. He started playing the piano at the age of 8 and later moved on to what was to be his main instrument, the drum kit, at age 10. He lives in Nuremberg.

=== Professional career ===
In 2003 Hannes Grossmann began to play drums in the technical death metal band Necrophagist and later recorded drums for the album Epitaph in 2004 which features complex polyrhythmic drumming and blastbeats of up to 240 bpm. Hannes stated in an interview on onlinedrummer.com that the drum lines were the ones previously programmed by Necrophagist frontman Muhammed Suicmez, which he played in (almost) exactly the same way, which was exactly one of the reasons Hannes left Necrophagist later on.

Hannes left Necrophagist in 2007 to join the band Obscura, along with his Necrophagist bandmate, Christian Muenzner, and Dutch bass player Jeroen Paul Thesseling, that has previously played in Pestilence. In 2008, Obscura were signed by Relapse Records and have gone on to release the album Cosmogenesis which was met with very positive reactions and cracked the US Newcomer Billboard. On September 28, 2010, Hannes joined the instrumental metal band Blotted Science, which features Ron Jarzombek (Spastic Ink) and Alex Webster (Cannibal Corpse). With them, he has recorded on The Animation of Entomology EP, which was released in 2011. He is also a member of Ron Jarzombek's latest musical venture Terrestrial Exiled with bandmate and countryman Christian Muenzner as well as Spastic Ink bassist Pete Perez. He was also involved in recording Christian Muenzner's solo album, Timewarp, which also features Steve Di Giorgio. To complete the list of his 2011 releases, he has recorded Obscura's third LP, Omnivium, that was, once again, met very positively by the fans and critics alike.

Hannes also teaches online drum lessons, which include personally customized lessons as well as stock drum video workshops that focus on Metal drumming.

In 2014, he released his first solo album, The Radial Covenant, which features a plethora of guest musicians including Christian Muenzner, Jeff Loomis, Ron Jarzombek, Morean and Per Nilsson. In 2018 Grossmann joined Thomas Gabriel Fischer's band Triptykon, replacing Norman Lonhard.

== Equipment ==
Hannes Grossmann endorses Meinl cymbals and Tama Drums.

== Discography ==
- Necrophagist - Onset of Putrefaction (additional drum programming on 2004 re-release)
- Necrophagist - Epitaph (2004)
- Shapeshift - Freak-EP (2009)
- Obscura - Cosmogenesis (2009)
- Obscura - Omnivium (2011)
- Christian Muenzner - Timewarp (2011)
- Terrestrial Exiled – Duodecimal Leverotation (2011)
- Blotted Science - The Animation of Entomology (2011)
- Obscura - Illegimitation (2012)
- Hannes Grossmann - The Radial Covenant (2014)
- Christian Muenzner - Beyond The Wall Of Sleep (2014)
- Asurim - Deus-Ex Novus (2014)
- Thy Darkened Shade - Liber Lvcifer I: Khem Sedjet (2014)
- Alkaloid - The Malkuth Grimoire (2015)
- Terminus Est - Harbinger-Single (2015)
- Gladius Sky - Ex Metallo (2015)
- A Loathing Requiem - Constellation of Flies (2015)
- Eternity's End - The Fire Within (2016)
- Hannes Grossmann - The Crypts Of Sleep (2016)
- The Fractured Dimension - Galaxy Mechanics (2016)
- Howling Sycamore - Howling Sycamore (2018)
- Alkaloid - Liquid Anatomy (2018)
- Yass-Waddah - Lights in the Murk (2018)
- Hate Eternal - Upon Desolate Sands (2018)
- Eternity's End - Unyielding (2018)
- Lelahell - Alif (2018)
- The Fractured Dimension - On the Precipice of Many Infinities
- Hannes Grossmann - Apophenia (2019)
- Gomorrah - Gomorrah (2019)
- Intruder Inc. - Deviation Formula (2019)
- Triptykon - Requiem (Live at Roadburn 2019) (2020)
- Hannes Grossmann - To Where the Light Retreats (2021)
- Freedom Of Fear - Carpathia (2022)
- Alkaloid - Numen (2023)
- Linus Klausenitzer - Tulpa (2023)
- Hannes Grossmann - Echoes of Eternity (EP) (2024)
- Fayence Dream - Repose of the Soul (2025)
- Sombretour - To any World beyond the Tomb (2025)

== Videography ==
- (2011) Progressive Concepts for the Modern Metal Drummer (2 DVD-Set)
