= Defeated Sanity =

German technical/brutal death metal band

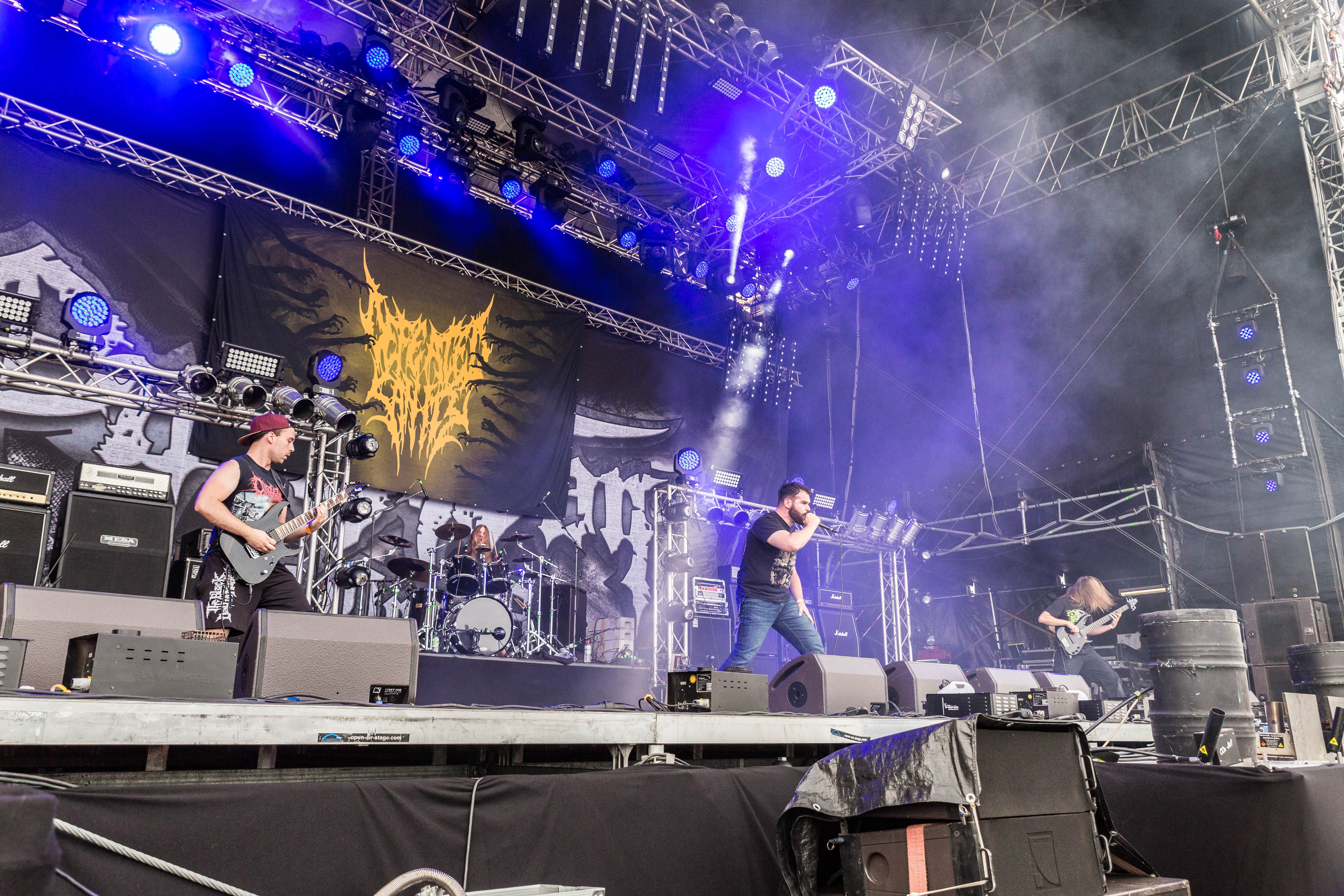
- Performing at 2019's Party.San Open Air

Background information
- Origin: Dachsbach, Bavaria, Germany
- Genres: Brutal death metal, progressive death metal, technical death metal
- Years active: 1993–present
- Labels: Grindethic, Willowtip, Seasons Of Mist
- Members: Lille Gruber; Jacob Schmidt; Josh Welshman; Vaughn Stoffey
- Past members: A.J. Magana; Jonas Gruber; Robert Colnik; Tino Köhler; Christian Münzner; Markus Keller; Wolfgang Teske; Jens Staschel; Christian Kühn; Konstantin Lühring

Defeated Sanity is a German technical death metal band from Dachsbach, Bavaria that guitarist Wolfgang Teske and his son, drummer Lille Gruber, formed in 1993. The group's lineup currently consists of Gruber (drums), Jacob Schmidt (bass guitar), Josh Welshman (vocals), and Vaughn Stoffey (guitar). The band is known for their brutal, abrasive and intricate style of death metal, while maintaining almost jazz fusion-style influences. Defeated Sanity's genre has been categorized as progressive death metal.

To date, the band has released seven studio albums: Prelude to the Tragedy (Grindethic Records, 2004), Psalms of the Moribund (Grindethic, 2007), Chapters of Repugnance (Willowtip Records, 2010), Passages into Deformity (Willowtip, 2013), Disposal of the Dead / Dharmata (Willowtip, 2016), The Sanguinary Impetus (Willowtip, 2020), and Chronicles of Lunacy (Season of Mist, 2024). The group released numerous promos, demos, and splits. Influenced by bands such as Cannibal Corpse and Suffocation, their music is inspired by American extreme metal.

== History ==
Guitarist Wolfgang Teske and his son, drummer Lille Gruber, founded Defeated Sanity in Dachsbach, Germany, in 1993. Initially, it was a side project that Gruber described as "[just] my dad and I jamming." Teske had performed as a jazz rock drummer in the 1970s with bands including Aera. In 1996, bassist Jonas Gruber and vocalist Robert Colnik joined the band as session musicians. This line-up recorded the first two demos, Devoured by the Black in the same year, followed by Withdrawn from Beauty in 1998. After a line-up change, Defeated Sanity recruited guitarist Christian Münzner and bassist Tino Köhler. Colnik departed the band shortly after recording a demo in 2000. He was replaced with Markus Keller, who re-recorded a track from the demo; the track was included on the split with Poppy Seed Grinder, released through the Czech label Grodhaisn in 2001. Later that year, Münzner left to join Necrophagist. Defeated Sanity released a 7-inch split EP with Brazilian death metal band Imperious Malevolence through Merciless Records in 2003.

=== Prelude to the Tragedy ===
In 2004, Defeated Sanity signed with UK label Grindethic Records to release their full-length debut. The album was recorded at Soundforge Studios in Rhauderfehn, Germany. The band produced the record and Andreas Hilbert engineered and mastered it. Prelude to the Tragedy was released in November that same year. The album received mixed reviews. Diabolical Conquest said, "Prelude to the Tragedy is a gleaming chrome harpoon of immaculate technical death metal, deftly interweaving cryptic riff-tangles with convolutional percussive violence to surprisingly comprehensible and utterly enjoyable results. Drum work, relentless in its complexity, enhances both the progressive and barbaric elements of the tracks, nailing ambitious patterns to them with satisfying snare punch, lucid cymbals and expert fills." Negative criticism of the album dwelled on the higher technical style of their music. Lords of Metal said, "This is only interesting for the real die-hard trash (not thrash!) lovers, and mathematicians, of course." To promote the album, the band toured during 2005, appearing at Rotterdam Deathfest (an extreme metal festival in The Netherlands), along with bands such as Suffocation, Visceral Bleeding, and Vomit Remnants.

=== Psalms of the Moribund and Chapters of Repugnance ===
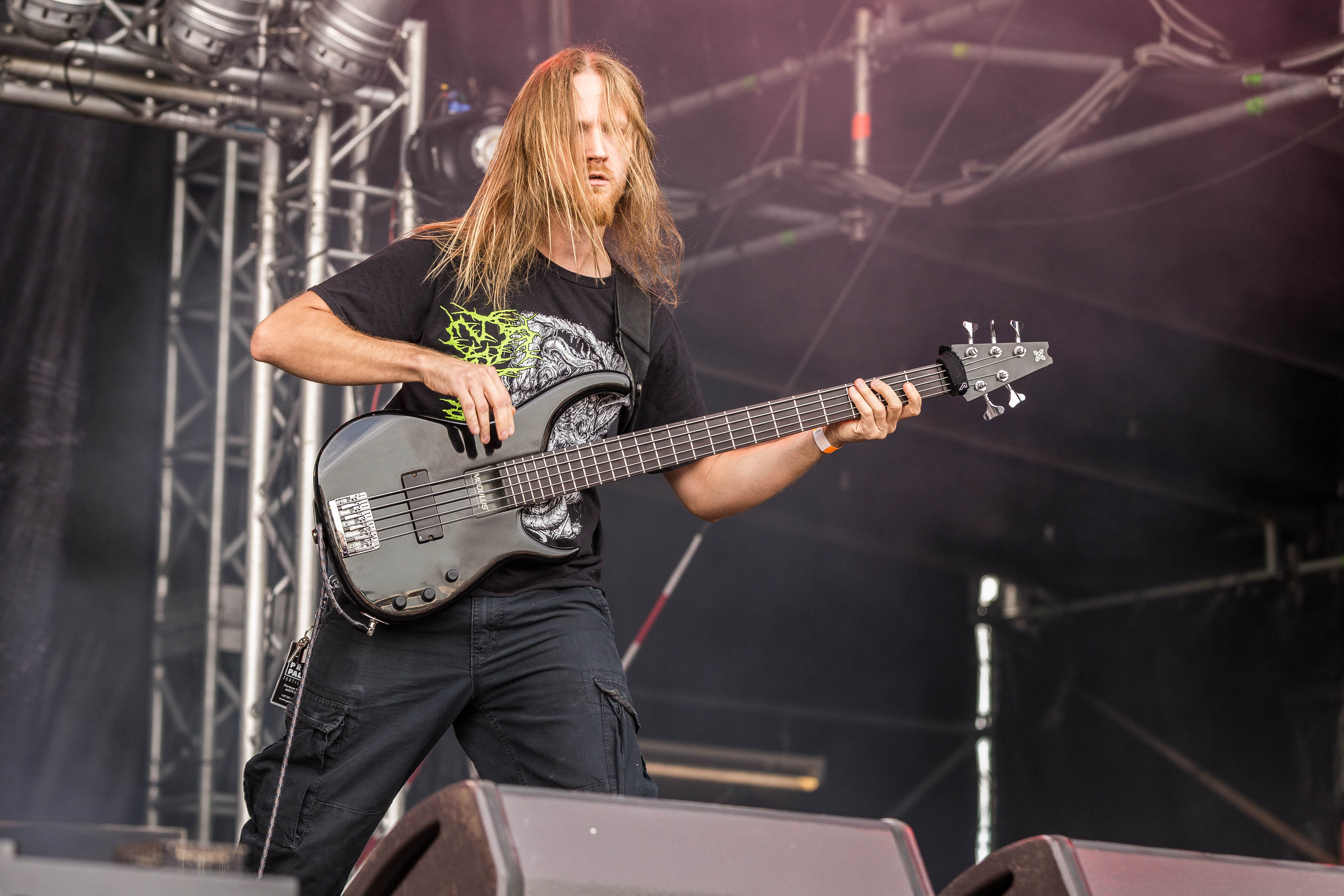
Bassist Jacob Schmidt joined the band in 2005.

Defeated Sanity underwent further line-up changes. Jens Staschel joined on vocals, Christian Kuehn on guitar, and Jacob Schmidt filling in on bass. In August 2006, the band recorded their second studio album at Soundlodge Studios. It was produced and engineered by Jörg Ukenand, and mastered by Robbert Kok of Disavowed. In the meantime, Gruber played drums for Austrian blackened death metal band Belphegor on their North American tour with Unleashed and Krisiun. Psalms of the Moribund was released through Grindethic Records in March 2007. Like its predecessor, the album received mixed reviews. Erik Thomas of webzine Teeth of the Divine said, "With ultra-deep, almost grindcore styled burps layered over complex yet savage riffs, Defeated Sanity, unlike some of their US peers, do manage to throw in some nice grooves and lurches amid the blasting carnage, hence the Suffocation and Devourment comparisons, but otherwise, Psalms of the Moribund is a pretty breakneck assault of squealing, pinch harmonics and ravenous blast beats." Chronicles of Chaos reviewer Kostas Sarampalis criticized Jens Staschel's vocal style, stating, "The constant low guttural growling is completely unintelligible, used more like a (very blunt) instrument rather than a means to convey lyrics."

The band played at Maryland Deathfest at the Sonar in Baltimore, Maryland in May 2008, with Anaal Nathrakh and Monstrosity. In July 2008, Staschel and Teske left the band in quick succession. After searching for almost a year, Defeated Sanity brought in vocalist A.J. Magana from Disgorge, who recorded the vocals on the band's third full-length album, Chapters of Repugnance, released through Willowtip Records on 4 May 2010. The album was recorded at Soundforge Studios in Berlin. According to Cosmo Lee of Decibel magazine, Chapters of Repugnance is the first album cover on Willowtip that the printer has refused to print. "It's a so-bad-it's-good Hieronymus Bosch-esque depiction of hell in which everyone is nude and bald." Founding member Wolfgang Teske died from complications involving his cancer on September 12, 2010, little over two years after he departed the band.

Beginning in late 2015, Defeated Sanity headlined a U.S. tour, performing their first concert shows in the United States since 2008.

=== Disposal of the Dead / Dharmata ===
Before the summer of 2016, Defeated Sanity confirmed work on a new release, which was a two-part full-length album with one side titled Disposal of the Dead and the other titled Dharmata. These two parts represent two EPs compiled onto a full-length, with each part carrying a sound unique to it. Disposal of the Dead represented the primal side of the band, while Dharmata was an homage to the old-school progressive death metal style of bands such as Atheist and Cynic. Dharmata prominently features vocals from Max Phelps of Baltimore progressive death metal band Exist, and formerly Cynic as well as Death DTA.

In late 2016, the band recruited American vocalist Josh Welshman to replace Lühring, who departed the following year. Prior to officially joining, Welshman provided vocals on the band's two US tours, the Obscene Extreme festival as well as other shows in Europe and Indonesia. In 2018, the band participated in the lineup for the American death metal festival Las Vegas Death Fest.

=== The Sanguinary Impetus ===
In May 2020, Defeated Sanity announced that their sixth album would be titled The Sanguinary Impetus, slated for a July release. Following Kühn's departure, Gruber performed all guitars on the album in addition to drums. Metal Injection called The Sanguinary Impetus "freakishly chaotic, frequently unnerving, and stupefyingly complex."

=== Chronicles of Lunacy ===
On 13 August 2024, the band announced their seventh album, Chronicles of Lunacy, would be released on 22 November, and revealed the first single from the album, "The Odour of Sanctity".

== Style and influences ==
Although the band is of German origin, their music is based on the American style of death metal. Drummer Lille Gruber explained, "Blues and rock music was developed in the U.S., that means it all goes back to this country. The roots are there and I think the best musicians will always be there." When asked about the difference in terms of sound and direction between Psalms of the Moribund and Prelude to the Tragedy, Gruber stated, "We got our own style on Psalms to the Moribund where Prelude to the Tragedy had very obvious hints of the bands we idolized. Psalms of the Moribund splits into two extremes, it went more chunky, brutal, thick and deep, but at the same time that math-approach and the technicality went up a lot!"

Defeated Sanity's main influences are the early work of Cannibal Corpse, Immolation, and Suffocation. Gruber also cited newer bands like Disgorge and Devourment as a source of inspiration. Defeated Sanity's lyrics are influenced by the Tennessee band Brodequin. Gruber described Brodequin’s lyrics as "dark and brutal", which fit with Defeated Sanity's gore imagery and said that it’s an “awesome concept”.

On Defeated Sanity's 2016 album Disposal of the Dead / Dharmata, the group perform two separate styles on the two EP-length halves of the album, with the band describing it as "a split with ourselves". Disposal of the Dead features their signature brutal and technical style while Dharmata is "an homage to old school progressive death metal" reminiscent of bands such as Death and early Pestilence. Jazz influence is prevalent as well.

== Members ==
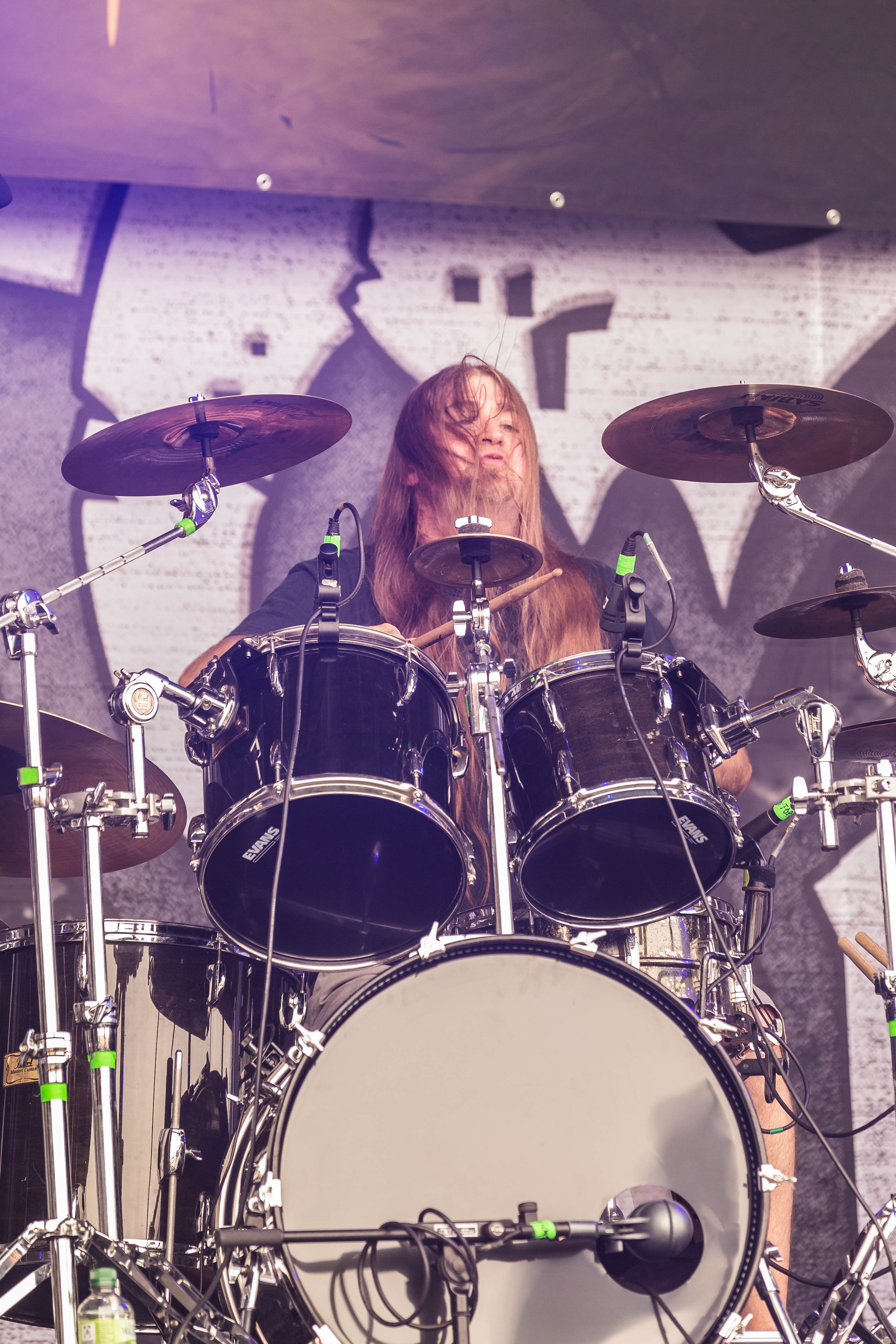
Drummer Lille Gruber is the group's main composer/songwriter, a position he has maintained since forming the band with his father Wolfgang Teske in 1993.

=== Current ===
- Lille Gruber – drums (1993–present), guitars (2019–2022; studio)
- Jacob Schmidt – bass (2005–present)
- Josh Welshman – vocals (2016–present; touring member 2015–2016)
- Vaughn Stoffey – guitar (2023–present; touring member 2022–2023)

Former live/touring members

- Justin Sakogawa – guitar (2019–2022)
- Kevin Heiderich – guitar (2015–2016, 2019)
- Max Phelps – vocals (2015–2017)
- Andy Tseung – vocals (2015)
- Tom Geldschläger – guitar (2016)
- Alex Weber – bass (2017)

=== Former ===
- Konstantin Lühring – vocals (2011–2015)
- A.J. Magana - vocals (2009–2011; touring member 2015)
- Jens Staschel – vocals (2004–2008)
- Markus Keller – vocals (2000–2004)
- Robert Colnik – vocals (1998–2000)
- Wolfgang Teske – guitar (1993–2008; died 2010)
- Christian Müenzner - guitar (1999–2002)
- Christian Kühn – guitar (2005–2019)
- Tino Köhler – bass (1998–2005)
- Jonas Gruber – bass (1996–1998)

== Discography ==
=== Studio albums ===
- Prelude to the Tragedy (2004)
- Psalms of the Moribund (2007)
- Chapters of Repugnance (2010)
- Passages into Deformity (2013)
- Disposal of the Dead / Dharmata (2016)
- The Sanguinary Impetus (2020)
- Chronicles of Lunacy (2024)

=== Demos/EP ===
- Devoured by the Black (1996)
- Defeated (1997)
- Withdrawn from Beauty (1998)
- Prelude to the Tragedy EP (2004)
- Promo 2000 (2000)
- Promo 2005 (2005)
- Promo 2007 (2008)

=== Split albums ===
- Talk Evolution / The Parasite (split with Poppy Seed Grinder) (2002)
- Live in Germany (split with Imperious Malevolence) (2003)
- Cerebric Turmoil / Defeated Sanity (2008)
- Unleashing the Seed of Parricide (4-way split with Venomed, Splattered Orgasm and Moonfog) (2010)

=== Compilations ===
- Collected Demolition (2010)
