= A Valediction =

Studio album by Obscura
- Released: 19 November 2021
- Studio: Studio Fredman
- Genres: Progressive death metal; technical death metal
- Length: 51:35
- Label: Nuclear Blast
- Producer: Fredrik Nordström

Obscura chronology
Diluvium (2018)	A Valediction (2021)	A Sonication (2025)

Singles from A Valediction
- 1. "Solaris" Released: 2021; 2. "A Valediction" Released: 2021; 3. "Devoured Usurper" Released: 2021; 4. "When Stars Collide" Released: 2021

A Valediction is the sixth studio album by German technical death metal band Obscura. It was released by the music label Nuclear Blast on 19 November 2021.

== Background ==
The album was written and recorded separately by the band members during the COVID-19 pandemic. The recordings were then sent to Studio Fredman in Gothenburg, Sweden. The vocals and acoustic guitar parts were recorded there and the final album was mixed and mastered by Fredrik Nordström.

Music videos were released for the tracks "Solaris", "A Valediction", "Devoured Usurper", "When Stars Collide", "The Neuromancer" and "Heritage".

== Reception ==
Professional ratings
Review scores
Source	Rating
Metal Injection	9.5/10
Metal Storm	8.2/10

Kevin Stewart-Panko of Metal Injection wrote "As far as technical death metal goes, A Valediction will receive deserved glowing praise from fans and heaps of critical brown nosing from those in the know." Sean Mclennan of New Noise stated the album "contains a collection of the band's most vibrant and emotive material heard on record."

== Track listing ==
All lyrics are written by Steffen Kummerer.

A Valediction track listing
No.	Title	Music	Length
1.	"Forsaken"	Münzner; Kummerer	7:16
2.	"Solaris"	Münzner; Kummerer	3:41
3.	"A Valediction"	Münzner; Kummerer	3:27
4.	"When Stars Collide"	Münzner	5:08
5.	"In Unity"	Münzner; Kummerer	4:48
6.	"Devoured Usurper"	Münzner	5:30
7.	"The Beyond"	Münzner	3:49
8.	"Orbital Elements II" (Instrumental)	Münzner; Kummerer; Thesseling	4:01
9.	"The Neuromancer"	Münzner	4:41
10.	"In Adversity"	Münzner	4:09
11.	"Heritage"	Kummerer	5:01

== Personnel ==
Obscura

- Steffen Kummerer – vocals, rhythm guitar
- Christian Münzner – lead guitar
- Jeroen Paul Thesseling – bass
- David Diepold – drums

Additional personnel

- Fredrik Nordström – production, mixing, mastering
- Mathias Garmusch, Robert Kukla, Yuma van Eekelen – additional engineering
- Björn Strid – vocals (track 4)
- Eliran Kantor – artwork
- Vincent Grundke – photography

== Charts ==
Chart performance for A Valediction
Chart (2021)	Peak position
German Albums (Offizielle Top 100)	93
Swiss Albums (Schweizer Hitparade)	69
