= Akróasis =

Studio album by Obscura
- Released: February 5, 2016
- Recorded: May 11 – June 25, 2015
- Genres: Technical death metal, progressive metal
- Length: 54:05
- Label: Relapse
- Producers: Obscura and V. Santura

Obscura chronology
Omnivium (2011)	Akróasis (2016)	Diluvium (2018)

Professional ratings
Review scores
Source	Rating
Exclaim!	8/10
Metal Hammer	4/5 stars
Metal Injection	7/10
MetalSucks	3.5/5 stars
Revolver	4/5

Akróasis (stylized as "Akrǿasis" on the cover) is the fourth studio album by German technical death metal band Obscura. It was released on February 5, 2016 through Relapse Records. A music video was released for the album's title track on November 19, 2015. A second music video for the song "Ten Sepiroth" was released through VEVO, MTV & VH-1 on June 20, 2016.

== Track listing ==
All lyrics are written by Steffen Kummerer.

No.	Title	Music	Length
1.	"Sermon of the Seven Suns"	Kummerer	7:12
2.	"The Monist"	Linus Klausenitzer	4:56
3.	"Akróasis"	Kummerer; Tom Geldschläger	4:24
4.	"Ten Sepiroth"	Klausenitzer	5:08
5.	"Ode to the Sun"	Kummerer	5:04
6.	"Fractal Dimension"	Kummerer	6:14
7.	"Perpetual Infinity"	Klausenitzer	5:52
8.	"Weltseele"	Klausenitzer; Tom Geldschläger	15:15
Total length:			54:05

CD edition bonus track
No.	Title	Music	Length
9.	"The Origin of Primal Expression"	Kummerer	3:56
Total length:			58:01

Vinyl edition bonus track
No.	Title	Music	Length
10.	"Melos"	Geldschläger	3:09
Total length:			61:10

== Personnel ==
Obscura

- Steffen Kummerer – vocals, rhythm guitar
- Tom Geldschläger – lead guitar
- Linus Klausenitzer – bass
- Sebastian Lanser – drums

Additional personnel

- V. Santura – production, engineering, mixing, mastering
- Dejan Djukovic, Jan Vacik, Thies Neu – engineering
- Maria Bullok, Monika Bullok – additional vocals on "Ode to the Sun"
- Matthias Preisinger – violin, viola, and orchestral arrangement on "Weltseele"
- Jupp Wegener – cello on "Weltseele"
- Phillipp Rohmer – double bass on "Weltseele"
- Orion Landau – artwork

== Charts ==
Akroasis landed at number five on the Top Heatseekers album chart, which lists the best-selling albums by new and developing artists, defined as those who have never appeared in the top 100 of The Billboard 200. Loudwire awarded Akroasis as "Best Metal Song of 2016". Whatculture awarded "The Monist" as "Best Heavy Metal Song of 2016". The Metalist awarded "Akroasis" as "Best Release of 2016".

Chart (2016)	Peak position
Belgian Albums (Ultratop Flanders)	181
US Heatseekers Albums (Billboard)	5
US Independent Albums (Billboard)	20
US Top Rock Albums (Billboard)	34
