= Linus Klausenitzer =

German bassist

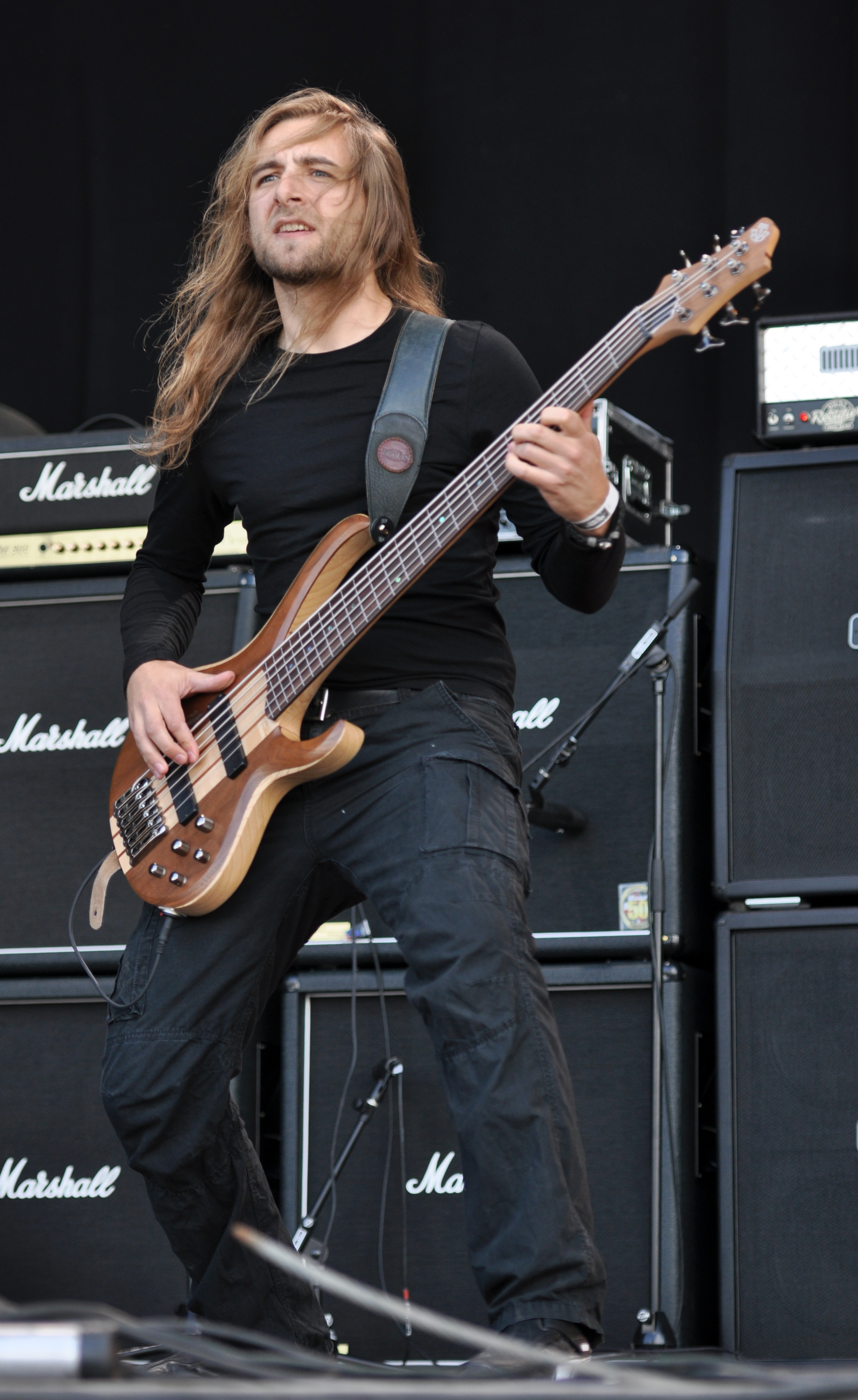
- Klausenitzer performing in 2013

Background information
- Genres: Technical death metal, progressive metal
- Instrument: Bass guitar
- Labels: Season of Mist
- Member of: Alkaloid, Eternity's End, Fallacy, Ilusen's Fallacy, Noneuclid, Obsidious, Beyond the Black
- Website: linus-klausenitzer.com

Linus Klausenitzer is a German bassist, best known for being a former bassist for the technical death metal band Obscura. He also plays bass in a German/Dutch progressive death metal band Noneuclid, as well as progressive death metal project Alkaloid along with former members of both Obscura and Noneuclid.

== Biography ==
At age 19, Klausenitzer attended the Music College in Regensburg, and afterwards made a degree at Hamburg Music and Art University. After finishing studies, he did a lot of session work in different genres, and in the meantime, was in a number of different German bands, Fall of Serenity being the most well-known one. He was also a member of Noneuclid, a German/Dutch progressive death metal band. He first joined Obscura as a touring bassist in 2011 and not shortly afterwards, Klausenitzer was announced as the band's new bassist. With them, he has recorded two albums—2016's Akróasis and 2018's Diluvium.

In 2014, Klausenitzer takes part in the brand new band called Alkaloid. The band's first album, The Malkuth Grimoire, released in 2015.

In April 2020, Klausenitzer, as well as his bandmates Rafael Trujillo and Sebastian Lanser, left Obscura due to musical differences and founded a new band named Obsidious.

In 2021, Klausenitzer appeared as live bassist for the German metal band Beyond the Black and played also on their "ORIGINS - The Online Acoustic Experience" live-stream concert.

== Discography ==
- Obscura - Illegimitation (compilation) (2012)
- Hannes Grossmann - The Radial Covenant (2014)
- Noneuclid - Metatheosis (2014)
- Asurim - Deus-Ex Novus (2014, session)
- Christian Muenzner - Beyond the Wall of Sleep (2014)
- Alkaloid - The Malkuth Grimoire (2015)
- Obscura - Akróasis (2016)
- The Ritual Aura – Tæther (2016, guest on track 6)
- Eternity's End - The Fire Within (2016)
- Hannes Grossmann - The Crypts of Sleep (2016)
- Fountainhead - Reverse Engineering (2016)
- Ilusen's Fallacy - The Ilusen's Fallacy (2016)
- Alkaloid - Liquid Anatomy (2018)
- Obscura - Diluvium (2018)
- Enblood - Cast To Exile (2018, guest on track 2)
- Kaoteon - Damnatio Memoriae (2018, session)
- Nepřítel - II (2019, session)
- Hannes Grossmann - Apophenia (2019)
- Death Tribe - Beyond Pain and Pleasure: A Desert Experiment (2019, session)
- Shaped In Dreams - Echoes of Eldren Deeds (2019, session)
- Hasan Iqbal - Of the Sky (2020, session)
- Christian Muenzner - Path Of The Hero (2020)
- Kaoteon - Kaoteon (2018, session)
- Hannes Grossmann - To Where The Light Retreats (2021)
- Vriess - Vriess (2021, session)
- Death Tribe - Beyond the Red Light District: A Canal Experiment (2021, session)
- Eternity's End - Embers of War (2021)
- Infinite Shapes - Singles (2020-2022, session)
- Obsidious - Iconic (2022)
- Alkaloid - Numen (2023)
- Linus Klausenitzer - Tulpa (2023, solo album)
