= Cosmogenesis (album) =

Studio album by Obscura
- Released: 17 February 2009
- Recorded: 2008
- Studios: Woodshed Studios, Landshut
- Genres: Technical death metal, progressive death metal
- Length: 50:15
- Label: Relapse
- Producers: Obscura, V. Santura

Obscura chronology
Retribution (2006)	Cosmogenesis (2009)	Omnivium (2011)

Professional ratings
Review scores
Source	Rating
AllMusic	3.5/5 stars
Blabbermouth.net	9/10
Hearwax Media	6.5/10 stars
Storm Bringer	4/5 stars

Cosmogenesis is the second studio album by German technical death metal band Obscura. It was released on 17 February 2009 by Relapse Records. The album debuted at No. 71 on the Top Heatseekers chart.

A music video was released for the song "Anticosmic Overload". The songs "Desolate Spheres" and "Centric Flow" are based on the poem "The Dance of Shiva".

Cosmogenesis was awarded "Best Death Metal Album of the year 2009" by Loudwire.

== Track listing ==
All lyrics are written by Steffen Kummerer.

No.	Title	Music	Length
1.	"The Anticosmic Overload"	Kummerer; Hannes Grossmann	4:17
2.	"Choir of Spirits"	Grossmann	5:31
3.	"Universe Momentum"	Christian Münzner	4:34
4.	"Incarnated"	Kummerer	4:53
5.	"Orbital Elements" (instrumental)	Kummerer; Grossmann; Jeroen Paul Thesseling	5:22
6.	"Desolate Spheres"	Kummerer; Grossmann; Münzner	4:02
7.	"Infinite Rotation"	Grossmann	4:49
8.	"Noospheres"	Kummerer; Grossmann	5:05
9.	"Cosmogenesis"	Kummerer; Grossmann; Münzner; Thesseling	4:15
10.	"Centric Flow"	Grossmann	7:26
Total length:			50:15

== Credits ==
Writing, performance and production credits are adapted from the album liner notes.

=== Personnel ===
Obscura

- Steffen Kummerer – vocals, rhythm guitar
- Christian Münzner – lead guitar
- Jeroen Paul Thesseling – fretless bass
- Hannes Grossmann – drums

Guest musicians

- Victor Bullok a.k.a. V. Santura (Dark Fortress, Triptykon) – backing vocals on "Universe Momentum," "Desolate Spheres," "Noospheres," "Centric Flow"

Additional musicians

- Tymon Kruidenier (ex-Cynic) – second guitar solo on "Choir of Spirits"
- Ron Jarzombek – guitar solo on "Cosmogenesis"

Production

- Obscura – production
- Victor Bullok – production, recording, mixing, mastering

Artwork and design

- Orion Landau – design
- Norudos – photography
