= Omnivium =

Studio album by Obscura
- Released: 29 March 2011
- Recorded: June–October 2010
- Studios: Woodshed Studios, Landshut, Germany
- Genres: Technical death metal, progressive death metal
- Length: 54:15
- Label: Relapse
- Producers: Obscura, Victor Bullok

Obscura chronology
Cosmogenesis (2009)	Omnivium (2011)	Akróasis (2016)

Professional ratings
Review scores
Source	Rating
Exclaim!	favorable
PopMatters	8/10 stars
Revolver	4/5

Omnivium is the third studio album by German technical death metal band Obscura, and the second album of Obscura's four album concept. The album was recorded at Woodshed Studio in southern Germany with engineer Victor Bullok (also known as Vic Santura). It was released by Relapse Records on 29 March 2011.

The album is based on Friedrich Schelling's Clara: or On Nature's Connection to the Spirit World (1810).

Obscura released the track "Septuagint" to the public on 19 January 2011. The second song from Omnivium, "Vortex Omnivium", was released to the public on 24 February 2011. The limited edition album included a bonus track, a cover of Cacophony's "Concerto", an embroidered Obscura patch, a guitar pick, and an album cover sticker.

Omnivium debuted at No. 11 on the USA's Top Heatseekers chart, and at No. 14 on Germany's Media Control Newcomer chart., furthermore, within the first week the album sold 2,000 copies in the US.

== Track listing ==
All lyrics are written by Steffen Kummerer.

No.	Title	Music	Length
1.	"Septuagint"	Kummerer; Christian Münzner; Hannes Grossmann	7:18
2.	"Vortex Omnivium"	Münzner; Grossmann	4:14
3.	"Ocean Gateways"	Kummerer; Grossmann	5:56
4.	"Euclidean Elements"	Grossmann	4:51
5.	"Prismal Dawn"	Kummerer; Grossmann; Jeroen Paul Thesseling	6:21
6.	"Celestial Spheres"	Grossmann	5:28
7.	"Velocity"	Kummerer; Grossmann	6:04
8.	"A Transcendental Serenade"	Kummerer; Münzner; Grossmann; Thesseling	6:13
9.	"Aevum"	Grossmann; Thesseling	7:51
Total length:			54:15

Limited Edition bonus track
No.	Title	Music	Length
10.	"Concerto" (Cacophony cover)	Marty Friedman; Jason Becker	4:42
Total length:			58:57

== Credits ==
Writing, performance and production credits are adapted from the album liner notes.

=== Personnel ===
Obscura

- Steffen Kummerer – vocals, rhythm guitar
- Christian Münzner – lead guitar
- Jeroen Paul Thesseling – bass
- Hannes Grossmann – drums

Guest musicians

- Tommy Talamanca – first guitar solo on "Euclidean Elements"
- Morean – guitar solo on "Velocity"

Production

- Obscura – production, recording, mixing, mastering
- V. Santura (Dark Fortress, Triptykon) – production, recording, mixing, mastering

Artwork and design

- Orion Landau – design
- Christian Weiss – photography

== Charts ==
Chart	Peak position
US Heatseekers Albums (Billboard)	11
