= Steffen Kummerer =

German guitarist and vocalist

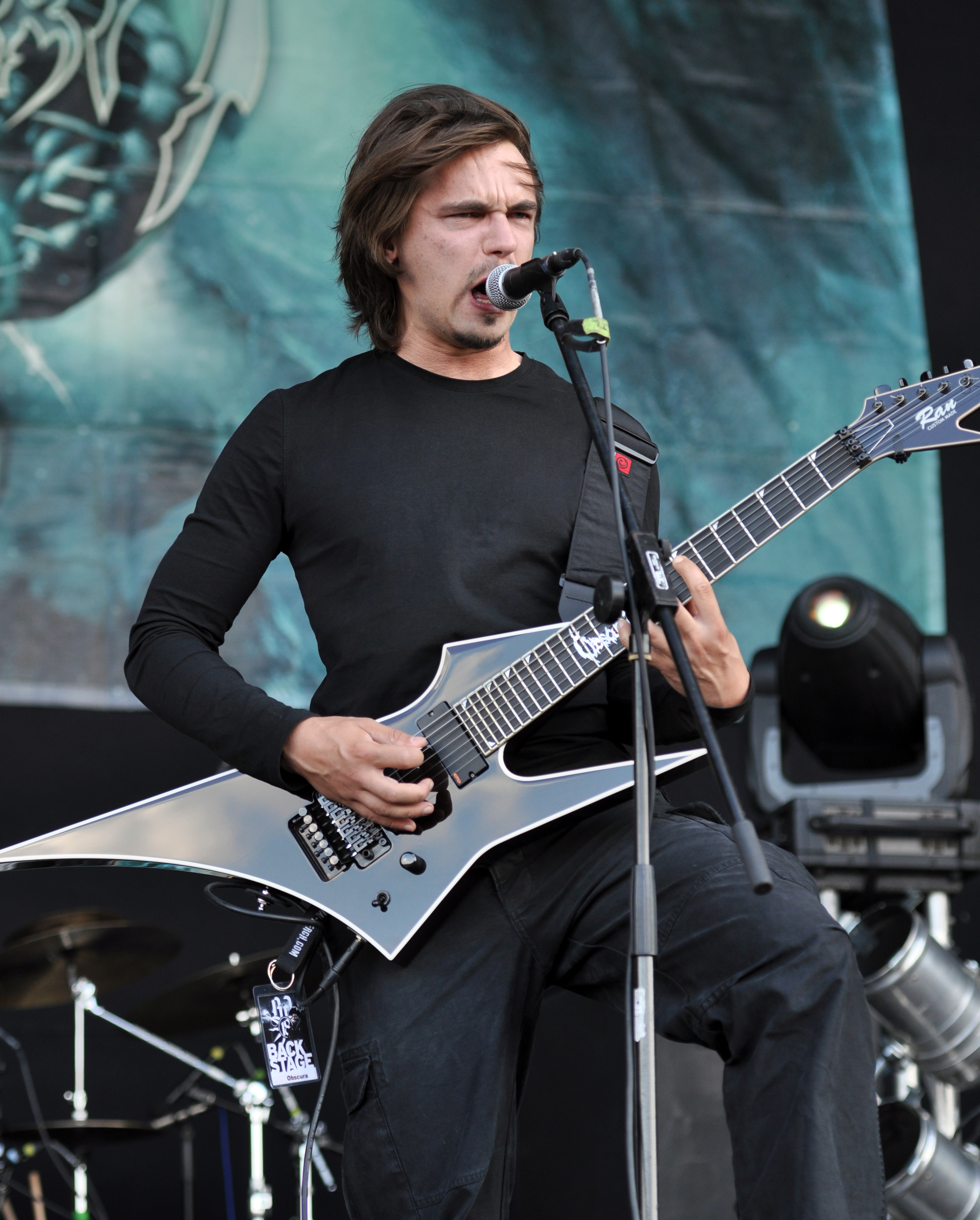
- Kummerer in 2013

Background information
- Born: 1 June 1985 (age 41); Karl-Marx-Stadt, East Germany
- Genres: Technical death metal; death metal; black metal; progressive metal
- Occupations: musician; songwriter; producer
- Instruments: Vocals; guitar; bass; drums
- Years active: 2002–present
- Labels: Nuclear Blast; Relapse Records; Napalm Records
- Member of: Obscura, Thulcandra
- Website: steffenkummerer.com

Steffen Kummerer (born 1 June 1985) is a German guitarist and vocalist. He is the leader, main songwriter, vocalist, and guitarist of the technical death metal band Obscura, as well as the black metal band Thulcandra. Since 2012, he has been a member of the official tribute band Death to All. Kummerer's Ran custom guitar shape have become a signature shape unique to him and his band Obscura.

== Biography ==
=== Early life and education ===
Steffen Kummerer was born in Chemnitz (Karl-Marx-Stadt then) on 1 June 1985. He started playing piano at the age of nine and received a scholarship for gifted musicians one year later. Kummerer studied singing solo, in a choir, and performing solo pieces and Piano four hands at the boarding school of world-known Regensburger Domspatzen, the world's oldest choir in Regensburg. Under the guidance of Georg Ratzinger and Roland Büchner, Kummerer achieved a broad understanding of music theory and performing concerts. At the age of 16, he learned to play guitar and founded the death metal band Obscura in late 2002.

=== Career ===
In 2002, Kummerer begun to study electric guitar and founded the death metal band Obscura. The band released six full-length records with world-wide chart entries through American-based label Relapse Records, before the band signed to the world's biggest heavy metal label, Nuclear Blast Records, in 2019. Respected by press and fans alike, Obscura became one of the most popular bands in their genre.

In 2003, Kummerer created the black metal band Thulcandra which released four full-length albums through Austrian major label Napalm Records. Supporting their albums, the band performed multiple tours in Europe and reached a cult status in the genre black metal.

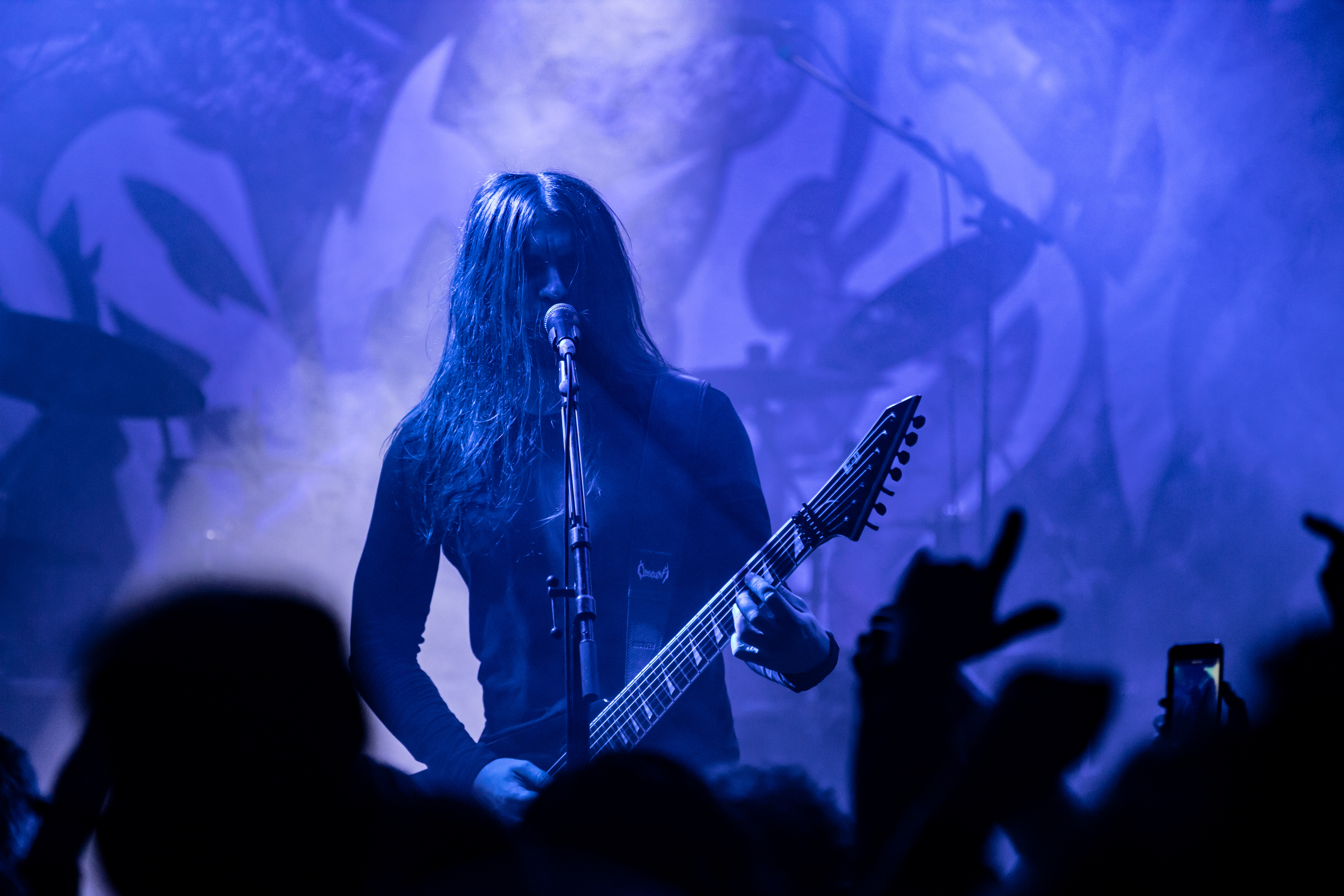
Kummerer performing in 2020

In 2012, Kummerer became a member of "Death to All", the official tribute act to American death metal pioneers Death, to replace their original singer and guitarist, Chuck Schuldiner. With "Death to All", Kummerer toured in Europe, Central and South America alongside former members Steve DiGiorgio (Testament, Sadus), Gene Hoglan (Dark Angel, Strapping Young Lad, Devin Townsend, Fear Factory, Dethklok and Testament), Paul Masvidal (Cynic), Sean Reinert (Cynic) and Bobby Koelble. In 2015, Kummerer received a Metal Hammer Award in Berlin as representative to the late Chuck Schuldiner, who died in 2001.

In 2017, a collaboration with Panzerballett under direction of Jan Zehrfeld featuring Mike Keneally (Frank Zappa, Joe Satriani), Jen Majura (Evanescence) and Mattias IA Eklundh was released.

Kummerer produced various music videos "Anticosmic Overload", "Akroasis", "Ten Sepiroth", graphic concepts, books and stage productions for various artists. In 2018, he starred in several music productions, such as "Mortification of the Vulgar Sun", "Diluvium" and "Emergent Evolution".

== Equipment ==
Kummerer endorses ESP Guitars, ENGL amplification, Steinberg, Ernie Ball, Sennheiser, Richter Straps, Presonus, EMG Pickups, Jericho Gehäuse, Scott Dixon, Arobas software, Celestion speakers & TC Electronic. Between 2003 and 2017, he has played RAN custom built guitars exclusively in both 6-string and 7-string versions with the iconic Obscura shape.

=== 2003–2017 Ran Guitars ===
- RAN SK signature 6-string guitar (2003) with EMG 81 pickup
- RAN SK signature 7-string guitar (2010) with EMG 707 pickup
- RAN SK signature 7-string guitar (2011) with EMG 81-7 pickup

=== since 2017 ESP Guitars ===
- ESP Japan Custom SK 7-string guitar (2026)
- ESP Japan Custom SK 7-string guitar (2020)
- ESP Japan Custom MII 7-string guitar (2017)
- ESP Japan EII Horizon 7-string guitar (2017)
- ESP Japan EII Arrow 7-string guitar (2017)
- ESP Japan EII Flying-V 6-string guitar (2017)
- ESP Japan EII Eclipse 6-string guitar (2013)

== Discography ==
=== Obscura ===
- Illegimitation (Demo) - (2003)
- Retribution - (2006)
- Cosmogenesis - (2009)
- Omnivium - (2011)
- Illegimitation (Compilation) - (2012)
- Akróasis - (2016)
- Diluvium - (2018)
- A Valediction - (2021)
- A Celebration I - Live in North America (Live album) - (2023)
- A Sonication - (2025)

=== Thulcandra ===
- Perishness Around Us - (2004)
- Fallen Angel's Dominion - (2010)
- Under a Frozen Sun - (2011)
- Ascension Lost - (2015)
- A Dying Wish - (2021)
- The Great Shadow EP - (2021)
- Hail The Abyss - (2023)
- Black Sun Aeon EP - (2023)
- Live Demise - (2024)

=== Guest/session appearances ===
- guest vocals on Persefone (Andorra) Metanoia - (2022)
- guest vocals on Panzerballett (Germany) X-Mas Death Jazz - (2017)
- guest solo on Stortregn (Switzerland) Singularity - (2016)
- guest solo on Mynded (Germany) Nuclear Downfall - (2015)
- guest solo on Wraithcult (Germany) Gestalt - (2013)
- guest solo on Over Your Threshold (Germany) Facticity - (2012)
- guest vocals on Pequod (Germany) Forgotten - (2011)
- guest vocals on Hokum (Germany) The Creation of Pain (2011)
- guest solo on Disdained (Serbia) The Last Opus EP - (2010)

=== Live/session appearances ===
- bass, Black Horizons (Germany) - (2003-2004)
- guitar, Festering Saliva (Germany) - (2005-2006)
- guitar, Helfahrt (Germany) - (2006-2007)
- vocals & guitar, Death (USA) - (2012 - present)
- bass, Secrets of the Moon (Germany) - (2016)
- vocals, Cynic (USA) - (2024)
- bass, Sacramentum (Sweden) - (2025)

=== Books ===
- Obscura - Cosmogenesis - Official Tablature Book (2010)
- Obscura - Omnivium - Official Tablature Book (2012)
- Obscura - Guitar Anthology - Official Tablature Book (2015)
- Death - Best of 1987 - 1998, Official Tablature Book (2015)
- Obscura - Akróasis - Official Tablature Book (2016)
- Obscura - Diluvium - Official Tablature Book (2018)
- Obscura - A Valediction - Official Tablature Book (2021)
- Thulcandra -The Essentials of Thulcandra - Official Tablature Book (2023)
- Thulcandra - Fallen Angel‘s Dominion, The Complete Guitar and Bass Transcription (2024)
- Thulcandra - Under A Frozen Sun, The Complete Guitar and Bass Transcription (2024)
- Obscura - A Sonication - Official Guitar & Bass Tablature Book (2025)
- Thulcandra - A Dying Wish, The Complete Guitar and Bass Transcription (2026)

=== Videography ===
- Anticosmic Overload - Official Music Video (2009)
- Akróasis - Official Music Video (2015)
- Ten Sepiroth - Official Music Video (2016)
- Diluvium - Official Music Video (2018)
- Mortification of the Vulgar Sun - Official Music Video (2018)
- Emergent Evolution - Official Music Video (2019)
- Solaris - Official Music Video (2021)
- A Valediction - Official Music Video (2021)
- Funeral Pyre - Official Music Video (2021)
- Nocturnal Heresy - Official Music Video (2021)
- Devoured Usurper - Official Music Video (2021)
- When Stars Collide - Official Music Video (2021)
- A Dying Wish - Official Music Video (2021)
- The Neuromancer - Official Music Video (2022)
- Heritage - Official Music Video (2022)
- As I Walk Through The Gateway - Official Music Video (2023)
- Hail The Abyss - Official Music Video (2023)
- Silver Linings - Official Music Video (2024)
- Evenfall - Official Music Video (2025)
- In Solitude - Official Music Video (2025)
- Stardust - Official Music Video (2026)
- The Sun Eater - Official Music Video (2026)
