= Obscura (band) =

German technical death metal band

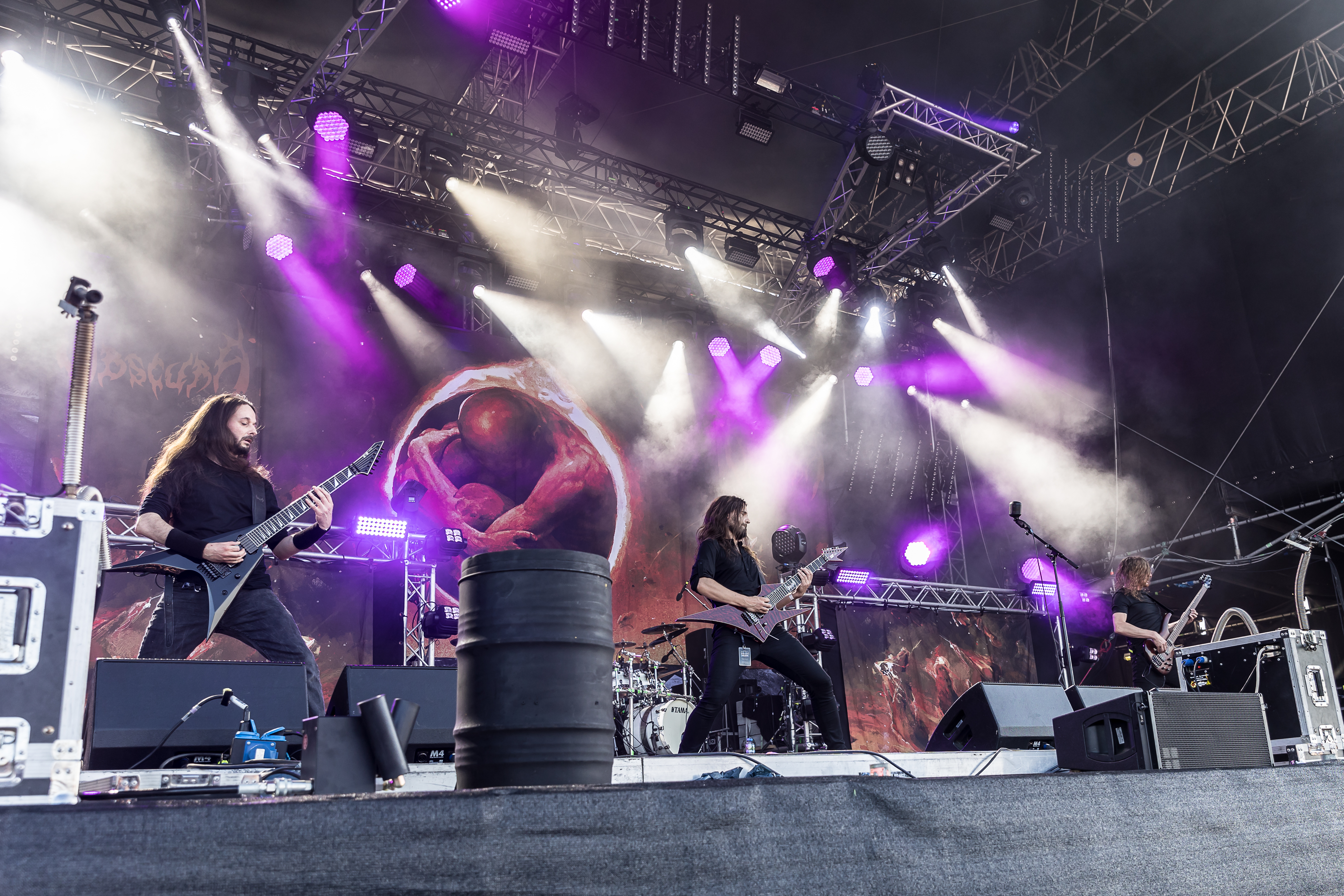
- Performing in 2024

Background information
- Also known as: Illegimitation
- Origin: Landshut, Germany
- Genres: Technical death metal; progressive metal
- Works: Discography
- Years active: 2002–present
- Labels: Relapse Records; Voice of the Soul Records; Nuclear Blast
- Spinoffs: Thulcandra
- Members: Steffen Kummerer; Kevin Olasz; James Stewart; Robin Zielhorst
- Past members: See former members here
- Website: realmofobscura.com

Obscura is a German technical death metal band from Landshut, founded by guitarist and vocalist Steffen Kummerer in 2002. The band has released seven studio albums, a compilation album, and seventeen music videos since its formation. Their latest album, A Sonication, was released in February 2025.

== History ==
=== Formation and Illegimitation (2002–2003) ===
Guitarist Steffen Kummerer, drummer Jonas Baumgartl, guitarist Armin Seitz, and bassist/vocalist Martin Ketzer formed Obscura in late 2002 as Illegimitation. Performing local shows, the band booked a concept tour in Bavaria called "Blasting Bavaria Tour" in 2003, followed by editions in 2004, 2005 and 2007. The band recorded their first and only self-titled demo in November 2003 with producer V.Santura (Triptykon, Pestilence, Dark Fortress). The four-song demo received positive feedback within southern Germany and took root in underground circles. In early 2004, Ketzer and Seitz left the band. Second guitarist Stephan Bergbauer joined to record their debut album in Summer 2004.

=== Retribution (2004–2007) ===
The band entered Mastersound Studios in Fellbach, Germany with producer Alexander Krull of Atrocity and Leaves' Eyes, who pushed the band within a three-week recording session. During the recording, the band was renamed after the Gorguts album Obscura. Finished in August 2004, Obscura self-released Retribution on 7 July 2005 and started work on a follow-up the same year. With guitarist Markus Lempsch and bassist Jonas Fischer, the band re-released Retribution on their own label and toured Europe with Suffocation in 2006. Performing at Brutal Assault Festival in Czech Republic, Mountains of Death Festival in Switzerland, and Up From the Ground Festival in Germany, Obscura gained a following in central Europe. In 2007, Obscura performed in several festivals in Europe, followed by their first headlining tour in Southern and Eastern Europe with Agonize. The tour started in Athens, Greece and contained 22 shows in Croatia, Serbia, Bosnia, Macedonia, Hungary, Slovakia, Germany and France. Lempsch and Baumgartl left the band in early 2007, and Obscura performed as a three piece with session drummer Matthias Landes of Dark Fortress and Noneuclid. Guitarist Johannes Rennig (Profanity) joined Obscura in October 2007. In November 2007, drummer Hannes Grossmann (ex-Necrophagist) and fretless bassist Jeroen Paul Thesseling (ex-Pestilence) became new permanent members, followed by guitarist Christian Münzner (ex-Necrophagist) in February 2008 to replace Johannes Rennig.

=== Cosmogenesis (2008–2010) ===
In September 2008, Obscura signed with Relapse Records and released its second full-length album, Cosmogenesis, in early 2009. The album sold around 900 copies in the US in its first week and debuted at number 71 on the Top New Artist Albums chart. The band started their first-ever North American tour as part of the Cosmogenesis Worldtour in April 2009 alongside Cannibal Corpse. Within one year, the band played more than 160 shows all over the world as support for Atheist, the Black Dahlia Murder and Cannibal Corpse. Their first headliner US tour followed, supported by Abysmal Dawn. Obscura toured Japan as support for Nile and Triptykon in 2010. On 16 February 2010, Obscura reissued their debut album, Retribution, remastered and repackaged with three bonus tracks. Obscura's official guitar tablature book for Cosmogenesis was released on 5 January. Metal Storm listed Cosmogenesis as one of the 100 most important death metal albums.

=== Omnivium (2011–2013) ===
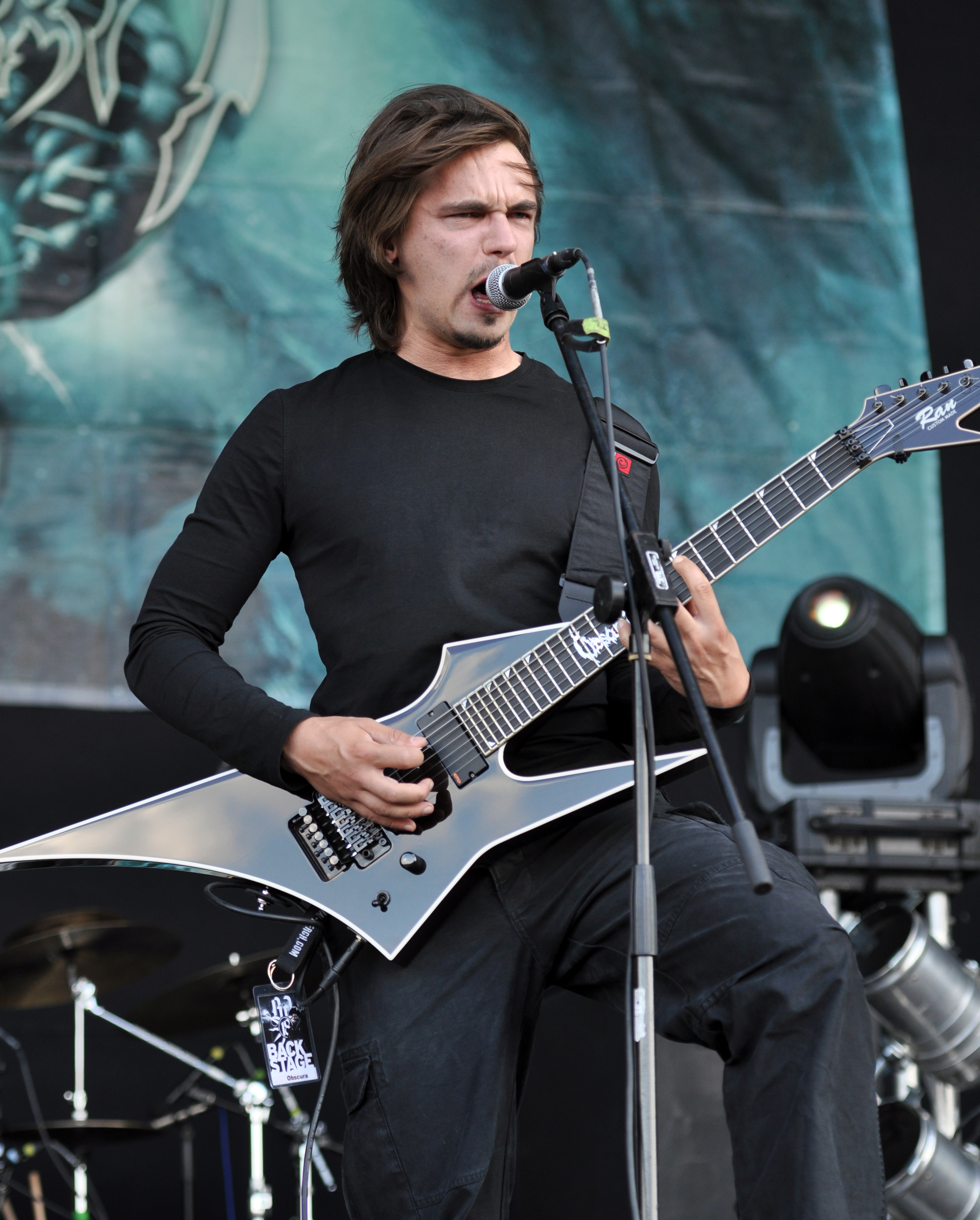
Founder and frontman Steffen Kummerer with his seven-string signature Ran guitar

Obscura released Omnivium on 29 March 2011. The record was written over two years, with members writing and e-mailing each other songs. The lyrics dealt with religion and evolution, with Kummerer influence by Friedrich Schelling's "On Nature's Connection to the Spirit World" The album earned positive feedback around the world and entered US and German charts, selling 2,000 within the first week of release in the US. It debuted at number 11 on the USA's Top Heatseekers chart, and at number 14 on Germany's Media Control Newcomer chart.

The album's artwork follows a specific color scheme as part of a four-album concept sequence. Orion Landau, who published the artwork for the last two albums, developed Kummerer's ideas for the cover art.

Thesseling left the band due to scheduling conflicts between Obscura and Pestilence. Thesseling cited economic reasons as the motive for rejoining Pestilence.

Thesseling was replaced with Linus Klausenitzer of progressive death metal band Noneuclid, announcement in September 2011. Obscura started the 164 concert-long Omnivium Worldtour in their hometown of Landshut, Germany, followed by a full European tour alongside Hate Eternal, Beneath the Massacre and Defiled. They played a five-week tour supporting Children of Bodom and Devin Townsend within North America. On 10 August, the band announced their first southeast Asian headlining tour, performing in Thailand, Indonesia, Singapore, and the United Arab Emirates. In November and December the same year, a North American headlining tour followed, supported by Abysmal Dawn and Last Chance to Reason. In March–April 2012, the band headlined a European run with support by Spawn of Possession, Gorod and Exivious. To promote Omnivium, the band played a headlining tour in Japan alongside Beneath the Massacre and Defiled in June 2012. In 2013, Obscura toured Europe alongside Death, with most of the shows sold-out and Kummerer performing Death songs every evening.

In late 2011, Obscura started a crowdfunding scheme to pay for the release of a combination of their first demo, demos from the Cosmogenesis pre-production sessions, and three cover songs from the bands Death, Atheist and Cynic. Within 60 days, fans donated $14,600, almost five times their financial target.

To celebrate their tenth anniversary, the band played a special show on 15 December 2012, in Landshut, Germany, with support from Dark Fortress and Hokum. The show featured a reunion of the early members who recorded the first demo, Illegimitation. This show closed the Omnivium World Tour. In March 2013, Obscura toured Europe supported by Aeon, Deadborn, and Over Your Threshold.

=== Akróasis (2014–2017) ===
In 2014, guitarist Christian Münzner left the band due to creative differences and his inability to tour as a result of focal dystonia muscle spasms. Hannes Grossmann left at the same time, citing his interest in forming a separate band. Obscura hired guitarist Tom Geldschläger and fusion drummer Sebastian Lanser of German jazz metal group Panzerballett. Obscura was scheduled to tour the US with the new line-up as a part of the 2015 Summer Slaughter Tour, but despite early applications for visas, they were unable to perform. Prior to releasing the band's fourth record, Akroasis, Obscura announced Munich Guitar Institute graduate Rafael Trujillo as their permanent lead guitarist, replacing Geldschläger, who was fired during the album production as of July 2015.

Obscura embarked on the "Akroasis World Tour" in Rome, Italy at 30 March alongside Death DTA. A Summer tour visiting major festivals such as Graspop Metal Meeting, Hammersonic Festival, Metaldays and many more followed in July and August. On 20 June, Obscura announced their headlining European tour supported by Revocation, Beyond Creation and Rivers of Nihil. Obscura then performed as part of the "Akroasis World Tour" three shows in Mexico. Being part of Sepultura's Machine Messiah Tour 2018, Obscura supported the major act on a four-week long tour in Europe and the UK. Opening acts have been the US American bands Goatwhore and Fit for an Autopsy. With many shows sold out, this tour has been the biggest run in Europe for the band up to this date. In April 2018 the band returned to Japan, supported headlining the "Akroasis Japan Tour 2018", as part of the Akroasis World Tour. Support acts have been Canadian technical death metal band Archspire, and French death metal group Xaon. Due to great demand Obscura played two shows in Tokyo.

=== Diluvium (2018–2020) ===
In January 2018, the band announced that they had completed their fifth full-length album, Diluvium, released on 13 July 2018 via Relapse. To promote the album, the band announced a major headlining tour in North America in September and October 2018 with Beyond Creation, Archspire, Inferi and Exist as support acts. In 2019, followed by the European leg with Fallujah, Allegaeon and First Fragment, Obscura went to Australia and New Zealand before returning to Japan to headline a row of tours under the banner Diluvium. Supported by Jinjer and Alarum the band grew their fanbase in both Asia and Australia to new heights. In March and April 2020 the band embarked on a European tour supported by Dutch death metal veterans God Dethroned, Thulcandra and Fractal Universe. Covering Scandinavia, southern and central Europe as well as the Baltics, the 'Diluvium Europa' Tour became one of the most successful tours for the band.

=== A Valediction (2020–2024) ===
In April 2020, Obscura announced guitarist Rafael Trujillo, bassist Linus Klausenitzer and drummer Sebastian Lanser parting ways with the band due to musical differences. Shortly after the band announced that former fretless bass player Jeroen Paul Thesseling and former guitarist Christian Münzner rejoined the band. Their sixth album A Valediction was released on 19 November 2021, on Nuclear Blast. Also in November 2021, Obscura announced a 49 date long North American tour with shows in Canada, the United States and Mexico, featuring Abysmal Dawn, Vale of Pnath and Interloper in support of the album that took place in 2022. For September and October 2022, Obscura announced a European Tour promoting "A Valediction" with support from Disillusion and Persefone. For February and March 2023, Obscura announced a North American tour alongside co-headliners Fleshgod Apocalypse, special guests Wolfheart and Thulcandra. Obscura also returned to Australia, playing a metal concert festival in Melbourne called Into the Fall, co-headlining with Gatecreeper. Obscura announced a 10-dates Latin American headlining tour, covering Argentinia, Brazil, Chile and more countries for October and November 2023. As closing show of the Latin American tour, Obscura performed alongside Gojira and Mastodon at MexicoMetal Festival, Monterrey. Additionally, a 17-date long UK and Ireland tour with Polish band Decapitated has been announced for November and December 2023. On November 7th, the band confirmed a European co-headlining tour with American progressive metal band Cynic, to be supported by Dutch thrash metal band Cryptosis. The tour under the monicker "The Focus Of A Valediction Tour" took place and wrapped up the “A Valediction World Tour” in March 2024.

=== A Sonication (2024–present) ===
In January 2025, shortly after the release of the single "Evenfall" from the band's seventh studio album A Sonication, former bassist Alex Weber publicly accused Kummerer of using melodies Weber had written, saying the departing members had received written assurance that their contributions would not be used. Max Phelps, Weber's bandmate in Exist, supported the claim, saying roughly two and a half minutes of the song were drawn from an Exist arrangement in progress. Former guitarist Christian Münzner, who had also left the band in 2024, made similar allegations about riffs and song structures elsewhere on the album, said he would explore legal options, and criticised Nuclear Blast for planning to release it. In an interview with the Brazilian magazine Roadie Crew, Kummerer dismissed the accusations as unnecessary public slander, said he had sent the finished album to the former members, and stated that there would be no official statement. A Sonication was released through Nuclear Blast on 7 February 2025, and several reviews noted the controversy surrounding it. In September 2026, the band said that since February 2026 it had filed criminal complaints in Germany against several unnamed individuals over publications and conduct dating back to 2015, which it considered defamatory or otherwise unlawful, and that it was also pursuing civil claims. The matters cited included copyright and intellectual property disputes. The band also blamed the public allegations for difficulties obtaining visas for performances in China, and said it would make no further comment while proceedings were ongoing.

In support of the album, Obscura toured Europe in February 2025 on the 23-date "Silver Linings European Tour", originally announced with support from Rings of Saturn and Gorod. Rings of Saturn later withdrew, citing immigration and tax regulations in Europe and the UK, and were replaced by Skeletal Remains. In April and May 2025, the band headlined the North American "Shred Fest 2025" tour, supported by Atheist, Origin, Decrepit Birth and Fractal Universe. The tour was announced with 26 dates across the United States and Canada and later expanded to 30. In May 2025, the band announced the third leg of the "A Sonication World Tour", 17 dates across Southern and Eastern Europe in September and October 2025. Direct support came from Italian band Sadist, with Greek thrash band Suicidal Angels and Italian death metal group Hideous Divinity appearing on selected dates. In October 2025, the band announced "The Sun Eater // Japan 2026", a five-date Japanese tour in May 2026 with American progressive death metal band Fallujah and French act Dvrk. In December 2025, the band announced "Stardust USA 2026", an 18-date United States tour in March and April 2026 with American bands Allegaeon and Cognitive and Dutch thrash metal band Cryptosis. The band was also confirmed for Hellfest 2026 in Clisson, France, where it announced it would perform A Sonication in its entirety.

In January 2026, the band expanded its Japanese dates into a four-week tour throughout May 2026, its most extensive Asian tour to date. The tour covered Thailand, Indonesia, Taiwan, Singapore, Vietnam, China, Mongolia, South Korea, Japan, India, the United Arab Emirates, Armenia and Georgia, and included an appearance at Hammersonic Festival in Jakarta. Dvrk provided support, with Fallujah also appearing on Japanese dates. Later that month, Obscura were announced as headliners of the 11-date Australian and New Zealand edition of Shred Fest in September 2026, with support from Fallujah, Ashen and Anoxia. In April 2026, the band announced an eight-date Mexican tour for October 2026 with American band Abysmal Dawn, German band Thulcandra and Mexican band Orion Rise. Later that month, Obscura announced Shred Fest 2027, a 39-date tour of Europe and the UK from January to February 2027 marking the band's 25th anniversary, with support from Pestilence, Cryptic Shift, Thus and Dvrk.

== Musical styles and lyrical themes ==
Obscura are known for playing technically and compositionally complex music, with several band members having studied music theory, audio and video production as well as performing arts.

The band’s biggest influence is the Canadian death metal band Gorguts, which Obscura named themselves after their 1998 album of the same name.

Founding member Kummerer devises the band's lyricism and imagery himself. Obscura's lyrics focus mainly on the writings of famous German philosophers. The band's second release, Cosmogenesis, presented their interest in philosophy, which Kummerer describes as being influenced by the works of Arthur Schopenhauer, and Johann Wolfgang von Goethe, with Omnivium showing a shift in interests, and being based solely on the work of German philosopher Friedrich Schelling.

In describing these lyrics, Kummerer states:

Cosmogenesis started with the beginning of our existence, the big bang theory if you want to say so, and deals with different layers and synonyms on a philosophical basis. The second, Omnivium, takes part of the evolution in many different layers such as the basic ape to human thought, religious topics, how the human individuals evolve within their existence and uses as its basic theme the novel On Nature's Connection to the Spirit World by Friedrich Schelling.

== Band members ==
Current

- Steffen Kummerer — rhythm guitar (2002–present), vocals (2004–present)
- Kevin Olasz — lead guitar (2024–present)
- James Stewart — drums (2024–present)
- Robin Zielhorst — bass (2024–present)

== Discography ==
=== Studio albums ===
- Retribution (2006)
- Cosmogenesis (2009)
- Omnivium (2011)
- Akróasis (2016)
- Diluvium (2018)
- A Valediction (2021)
- A Sonication (2025)

=== Compilations & live albums ===
- Illegimitation (2012)
- A Celebration I – Live in North America (2023)

=== Demos ===
- Illegimitation (2003)

=== Books ===
- Obscura – Cosmogenesis – Official Guitar tablature (2010)
- Obscura – Omnivium – Official Guitar tablature (2012)
- Obscura – Guitar Anthology – Official Guitar tablature (2015)
- Obscura – Akroasis – Official Guitar tablature (2016)
- Obscura – Akroasis – Official Bass tablature (2016)
- Obscura – Diluvium – Official Guitar tablature (2018)
- Obscura – Diluvium – Official Bass tablature (2018)
- Obscura – A Valediction – Official Guitar Tablature (2021)
- Obscura – A Valediction – Official Bass Tablature (2024)
- Obscura – A Sonication – Official Guitar & Bass Tablature (2025)

=== Music videos ===
- Anticosmic Overload (2009)
- Akróasis (2015)
- Ten Sepiroth (2016)
- Diluvium (2018)
- Mortification of the Vulgar Sun (2018)
- Emergent Evolution (2019)
- Solaris (2021)
- A Valediction (2021)
- Devoured Usurper (2021)
- When Stars Collide (2021)
- The Neuromancer (2022)
- Heritage (2022)
- Silver Linings (2025)
- Evenfall (2025)
- In Solitude (2025)
- Stardust (2026)
- The Sun Eater (2026)
