= Jeroen Paul Thesseling =

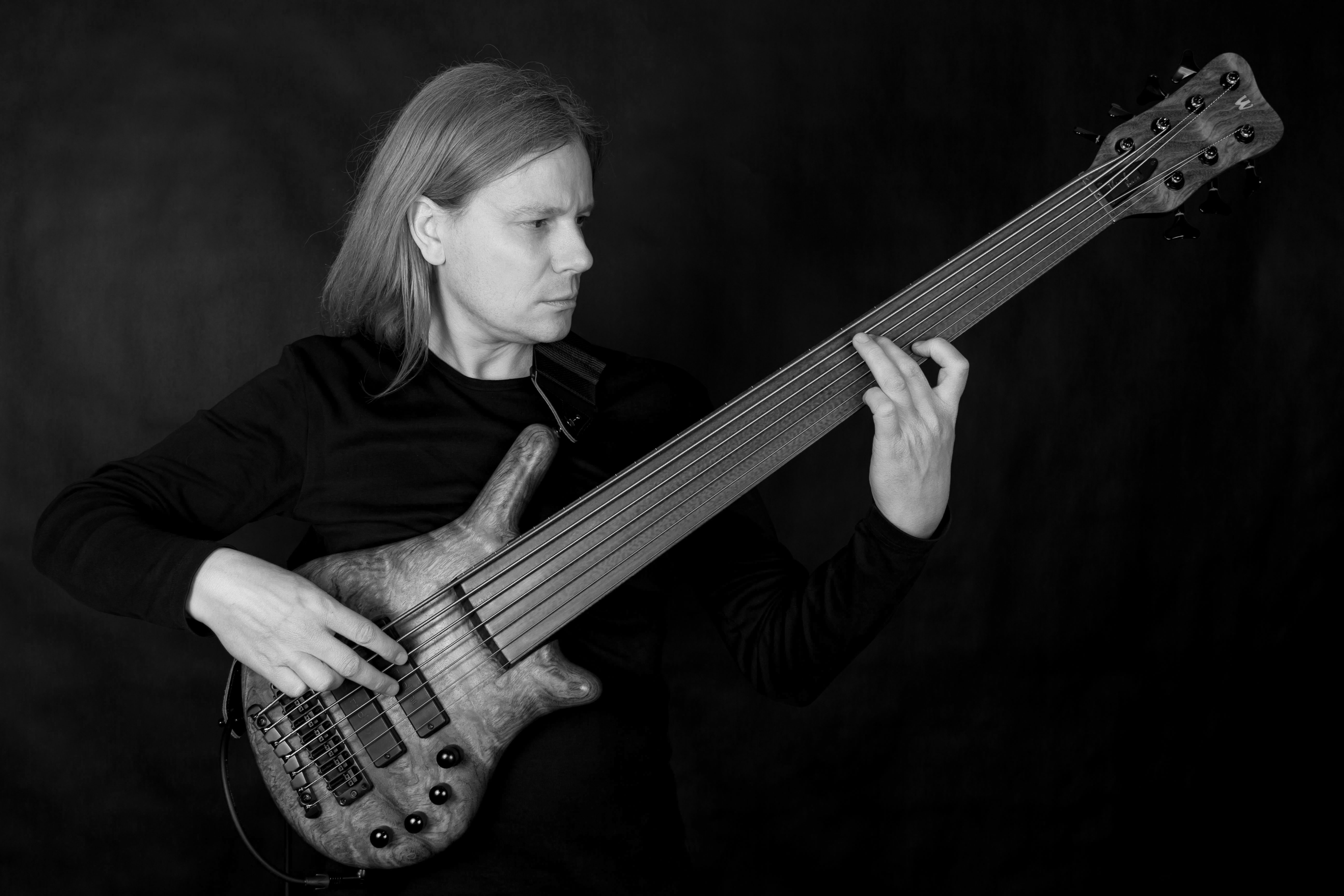
- Jeroen Paul Thesseling, 2016

Background information
- Born: 13 April 1971 (age 55)
- Genres: Technical death metal Death metal Progressive metal
- Instruments: Bass guitar (fretless bass exclusively)
- Years active: 1991–present
- Label: Roadrunner Records Relapse Records Mascot Records Hammerheart Records Agonia Records Nuclear Blast Records
- Member of: Quadvium
- Formerly of: Obscura; Pestilence
- Website: jeroenpaulthesseling.com

Jeroen Paul Thesseling (born 13 April 1971) is a Dutch musician, most famous for his work in the German technical death metal band Obscura, the Dutch progressive death metal band Pestilence and the Dutch-American metal-fusion group Quadvium.

== Biography ==
Early life

Jeroen started studying violin and followed his first lessons at the age of 7. During his youth he played with classical orchestras, ensembles and attended several classical music contests. At the age of 16 he switched to bass guitar.

Professional career

Thesseling began studying bass in 1988 at the ArtEZ School of Music in Enschede, Netherlands. Between 1992 and 1994, he was a member of Pestilence, with whom he recorded the jazz fusion-influenced album Spheres. In 1995 Jeroen started to study microtonality, which resulted in two pieces: Hafnium — study in 72-tone equal temperament (1999) — and Argon — study in 18-tone equal temperament (2000). The period following, Arabic microtonal and contemporary classical music inspired him to focus primarily on fretless bass. In 2005, he recorded his first fretless work with the studio group Ensemble Salazhar. Despite their highly acclaimed demo Colors the group never officially released recordings. Between 2007 and 2011, he collaborated with Obscura and recorded with them Cosmogenesis (2009) and Omnivium (2011). Between 2009 and 2012, he rejoined Pestilence after a 15-year break and recorded their sixth studio album Doctrine (2011). Since 2011, he has played exclusively fretless 7-string basses built by German bass luthier Warwick; they are strung with a subcontra F#-tuning (F#_{0}–B_{0}–E_{1}–A_{1}–D_{2}–G_{2}–C_{3}). In late 2014, he founded the jazz fusion group Salazh Trio featuring legendary Cuban drummer/percussionist Horacio Hernández. Their debut work Circulations was released in December 2017. In October 2019, he founded the instrumental progressive metal-fusion quartet Quadvium with fellow fretless bass player Steve Di Giorgio. From 2020 till 2022 Jeroen rejoined the German technical death metal band Obscura after a nine-year break. With them, he recorded their sixth studio album A Valediction (2021). In 2024 Quadvium finished their much anticipated recordings and released the debut studio album Tetradōm (2025) via Agonia Records. Jeroen lives in Amsterdam, the Netherlands.

== Equipment ==
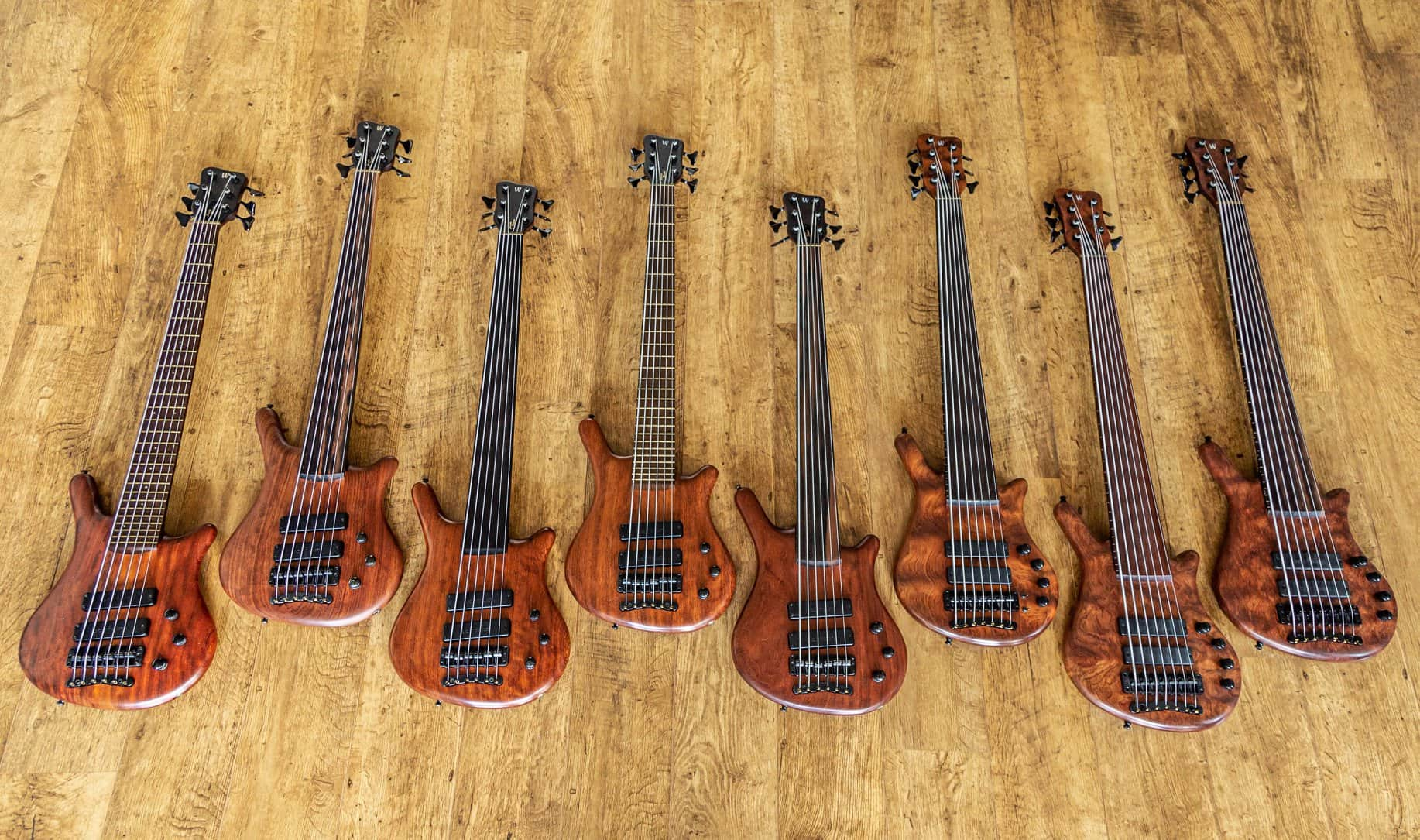
Jeroen Paul Thesseling's Warwick Thumb NT collection

Jeroen endorses Warwick basses and has played Warwick Thumb NT series exclusively since 1993. He has played several Thumb NT6 and NT7 basses, each marking different chapters of his musical career. During Pestilence's Spheres era, he played a Thumb NT6 bass. Later on, he started using fretless Thumb NT6 basses, for Obscura's Cosmogenesis and Omnivium era. In 2011, he started playing custom shop Thumb NT7 fretless basses, which are most notably heard on the recording of Pestilence's Doctrine album, Obscura's A Valediction album and Quadvium's Tetradōm album.

Warwick 7-string basses (customshop)

- Warwick Thumb NT7 fretless Ebony fingerboard (2017)
- Warwick Thumb NT7 fretless Snakewood fingerboard (2013)
- Warwick Thumb NT7 fretless Ebony fingerboard (2011)

Warwick 6-string basses

- Warwick Thumb NT6 fretless Macassar Ebony fingerboard (1993)
- Warwick Thumb NT6 fretless Ebony fingerboard (1991)
- Warwick Thumb NT6 Wenge fretboard (1991)
- Warwick Thumb NT6 fretless Asian Ebony fingerboard (1989)
- Warwick Thumb NT6 Wenge fretboard (1989)

Recording gear

- Phoenix Audio DRSQ4 MkII dual channel preamps
- Kush Audio Electra dual channel parametric equalizer

== Discography ==
Studio

- Quadvium – Tetradōm (2025, Agonia Records)
- Sadist – Firescorched (session, 2022, Agonia Records)
- Obscura – A Valediction (2021, Nuclear Blast)
- Salazh Trio – Circulations (2017, Salazh Trio)
- Obscura – Omnivium (2011, Relapse Records)
- Pestilence – Doctrine (2011, Mascot Records)
- MaYaN – Quarterpast (session, 2011, Nuclear Blast)
- Obscura – Cosmogenesis (2009, Relapse Records)
- Pestilence – Spheres (1993, Roadrunner Records)

Live

- Pestilence – Presence of the Past (2015, Marquee Records)

Compilations

- Pestilence – The Roadrunner Albums (Warner Music Group)
- Pestilence – Twisted Truth (2020, Warner Music Group)
- Pestilence – Prophetic Revelations (2018, Hammerheart Records)
- Pestilence – Reflections of the Mind (2016, Vic Records)
- Lange Frans – Levenslied (2012, TopNotch)
- Pestilence – Mind Reflections (1994, Roadrunner Records)

== Official music videos ==
- Quadvium – Adhyasa (2025)
- Quadvium – Apophis (2025)
- Quadvium – Náströnd (2025)
- Obscura – Heritage (2022)
- Obscura – The Neuromancer (2022)
- Sadist – Accabadora (2022)
- Obscura – When Stars Collide (2021)
- Obscura – Devoured Usurper (2021)
- Obscura – A Valediction (2021)
- Obscura – Solaris (2021)
- Obscura – Anticosmic Overload (2009)
- Pestilence – Mind Reflections (1993)
