= Jason Gobel =

American musician (born 1970)

- Born: September 30, 1970; Miami, Florida, U.S.
- Genres: Progressive metal Technical death metal progressive rock
- Occupation: Guitarist
- Instrument(s): Guitar, Keyboards

Jason Göbel (born September 30, 1970) is an American guitarist, best known for being a member of the progressive metal band Cynic during their original run.

With Cynic, he recorded on several of their first demos as well as on their 1993 debut album Focus.

== History ==
Gobel joined Cynic in 1988, alongside Jack Kelly, Mark Van Erp, Paul Masvidal, and Sean Reinert. He first met the band at a show where they played alongside his brother's band, who introduced them after their set. In 1989, the band released Reflections of a Dying World with Gobel on guitars, with Masvidal taking over vocal duties. The band released two other demos between the years of 1990 and 1991, before the band members received individual offers to join additional bands.

While Reinert and Masvidal had joined Death and Tony Choy had joined both Atheist and Pestilence, Gobel had joined the Florida-based death metal band Monstrosity. Gobel noted this was done with the strategy of passing the Cynic name around the scene by the individual members' reputations. The band were needing another guitarist for their album and had five songs finished, with Gobel working on three more. In 1992, the band released their debut album Imperial Doom with Gobel working alongside future Cannibal Corpse vocalist George "Corpsegrinder" Fisher and future Malevolent Creation members Jon Rubin, Mark Van Erp, and Lee Harrison.

Once Cynic received a label offer from Roadrunner Records, Gobel returned to the band alongside Masvidal and Reinert, who had recently been fired from Death with the new member bassist Sean Malone. Roadrunner released a split with Cynic as well as Pestilence and progressive thrash metal band Believer, called The Breed Beyond. The band recorded their debut album, Focus, which was put out through Roadrunner in 1993. The album is widely considered one of the greatest progressive metal albums ever, however, it did not initially go over well. The band embarked on the Focus tour with Cannibal Corpse and dissolved soon thereafter due to the lack of interest from the audience.

Following the dissolution of Cynic, Gobel formed a project with Masvidal and Reinert in an attempt to create a more commercially viable project with Portal, a lighter side project of the band Cynic. The project had backing from Atlantic Records, however, it did not release for many years due to the individual members' contract with Roadrunner. The demo came out in 1995, however the project dissolved by 1996. Gobel played with Gordian Knot, a band formed by Sean Malone, also a former Cynic member on the 2003 album, Emergent.

In 2020, Gobel returned from his musical hiatus with Eggshell Repair Kit, a project that featured Reinert and two former Traced in Air-era Cynic members guitarist Tymon Kruidenier and bassist Robin Zielhorst, who were both in Our Oceans and Exivious as well. The project debut in September 2020, following Reinert's passing. Since returning to music, Gobel began working with Santiago Dobles (ex-Pestilence, Aghora) on a project called Verdana.

== Personal life ==
He lives in Miami with his two children. When Gobel was 17, he began working as a dog trainer, assisting dogs in training for bomb detection, cadaver detection, drug detection, and several other forms of training. He worked in the field for around 10 years. He also operated as a locksmith during his time with Cynic.

== Bands ==
Current

- Verdana

Former

- Cynic (1988-1994)
- Portal (1994-1996)
- Eggshell Repair Kit (2020)

Session

- Monstrosity (1992)
- Gordian Knot (2003)
