= Ruination =

Ruination may refer to:

- Ruination (Transformers), a Transformers character
- Ruination (album), 2009 album by Job for a Cowboy
