= Genesis (Job for a Cowboy album) =

Studio album by Job for a Cowboy
- Released: May 15, 2007
- Recorded: Blue Light Audio Media in Phoenix, Arizona
- Genre: Death metal
- Length: 30:47
- Label: Metal Blade
- Producer: Cory Spotts

Job for a Cowboy chronology
Doom (2005)	Genesis (2007)	Ruination (2009)

Genesis is the debut studio album by American death metal band Job for a Cowboy. The album was released on May 15, 2007 through Metal Blade Records, it is their first concept album and is based on possible consequences of the VeriChip, along with the Book of Revelation and apocalyptic theories. It also sees Job for a Cowboy's change into a more straightforward death metal based sound with their previous release, Doom being within the deathcore genre.

Those who pre-ordered the album received signed copies in the days preceding its official release date of May 15, 2007. Genesis is the final release by Job for a Cowboy to feature founding member Ravi Bhadriraju. This album also marked the last time the band would work with drummer Elliot Sellers, who announced that he would be leaving the band immediately after recording to go back to school. He was replaced by Jon Rice for the following tour and remained with the band until October 2013.

== Lyrical themes ==
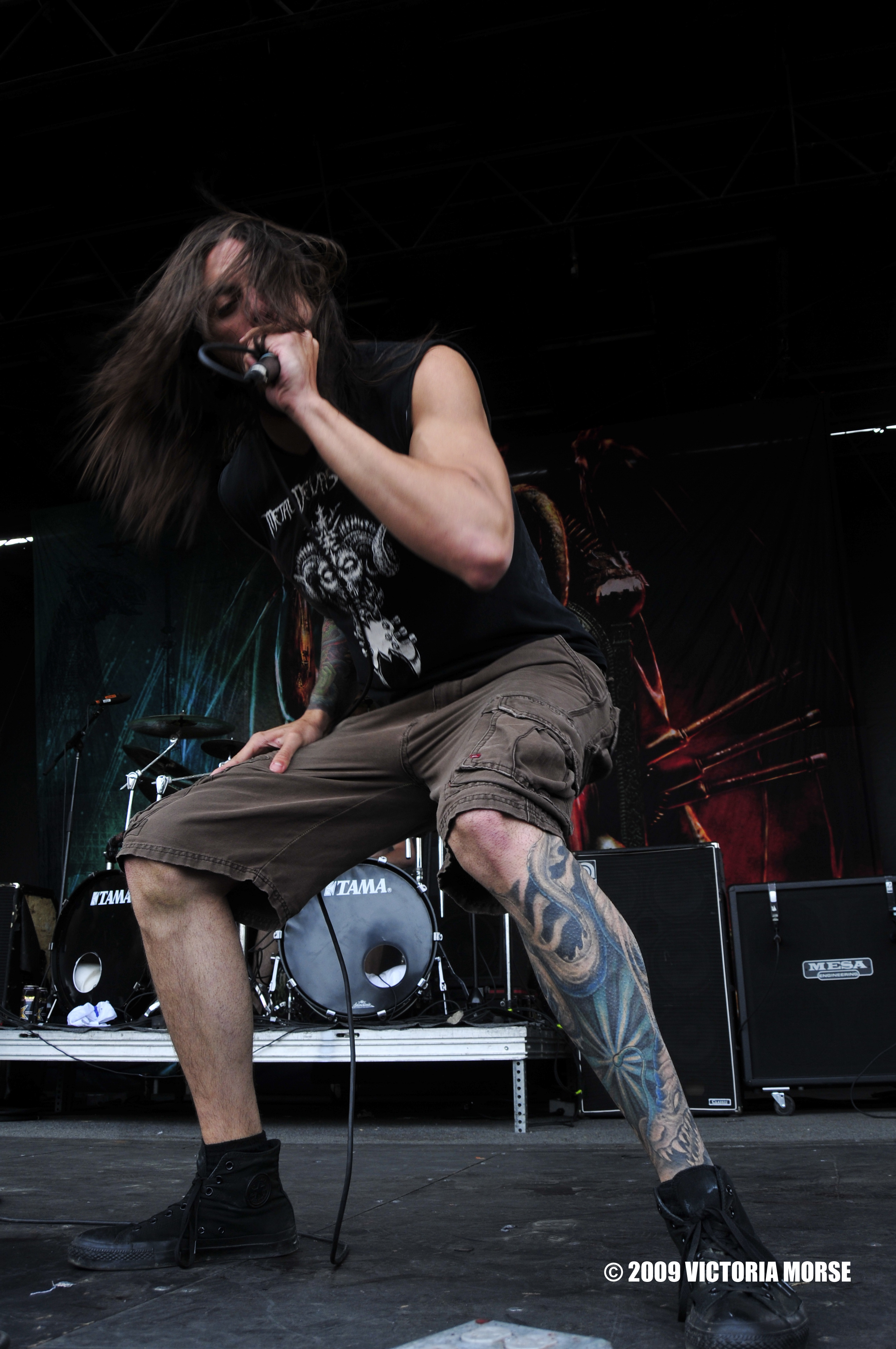
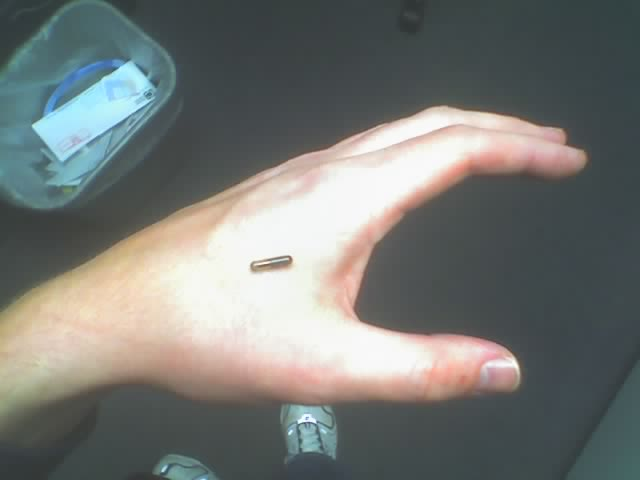
Jonny Davy (left) penned the lyrics for the album, which were heavily inspired by a brand of microchips known as VeriChips, which were designed for human implantation (right).

Genesis is a concept album in which mentions the VeriChip, an implantable microchip, that is embedded under human skin. The device has generated controversy among certain religious groups, which have become against the possible use of it, as there is a Biblical prophecy where all persons must receive the Mark of the Beast "on their right hand or on their foreheads", described in Book of Revelation 13: 16–18, to participate in economic activity under the government of the Antichrist.

Blabbermouth explained "Even though [Genesis] isn't being promoted as a concept effort, the songs clearly tell a story of technology, religion and corrupt government, and how they combine to lead to the end of civilization."

Vocalist Jonny Davy said his interest in writing an album about the VeriChip came from his realization of being an atheist at a young age and that "over time, I read up on a lot of religions and religious conspiracies and conspiracies in general. The record is actually about a biochip called the 'VeriChip' that's being implanted [into people] and used for medical identification and money currency purposes. People feel it's an invasion of privacy, and the other aspect is religious leaders have come out against it for fear that this is going to be a fulfillment of a prophecy in the Book Of Revelations." He went on to say "On the religious side, you can turn on American Christian television and they'll be talking about [the VeriChip] on their little talk shows. Religious leaders fear that the Antichrist is going to use the chip to control every man and woman in America and later the whole world."

Shortly after the release of Genesis, the band was victim to some controversy for allegedly containing an anti-Christian message found on the album, but the band members have denied these accusations.

We have nothing against Christians, though. We aren't a satanic band or anything like that. We just think it's a cool concept so we ran with it, and I'm glad we did. I'm sure there will be some Christian backlash, but what can you do about it?

— Guitarist Ravi Bhadriraju, talking about the album's themes.

== Musical style ==
Chad Bowar of About.com described the band's musical evolution, saying: "Job for a Cowboy's sound has evolved from deathcore to straight ahead death metal." Bowar also praised the guitarists Ravi Bhadriraju and Bobby Thompson, saying that both have done a "good job at creating innovative riffs and play some quick but skillful solos."

== Critical reception ==
Professional ratings
Review scores
Source	Rating
About.com	4/5 stars
AllMusic	2.5/5 stars
Blabbermouth.net	7.5/10 stars
Metal Injection	8.5/10 stars
PopMatters	5/10 stars

On the day of the release, the album debuted at number 54 on the Billboard 200 and number 4 for Independent Albums and sold nearly 13,000 copies in its first week, making Genesis the highest-charting heavy metal debut since Slipknot's self-titled record. The music video for "Embedded" was directed by Grammy Award nominated Popcore films.

The album received generally positive reviews, with many critics praising the band's musicianship and their songwriting improvement when compared to Doom. Kerrang! magazine said that Genesis is "an album that quite literally obliterates everyone else currently residing within the death and grind scenes" and "one of the year's most essential metal purchases". Scott Alisoglu of Blabbermouth.net, praised the album saying that Genesis "is a strong modern death metal release". Metal Injection heavily praised the guitar and bass riffs of Bhadriraju, Thompson and Riggs stating that the trio's "playing styles compliment [sic] each other wonderfully."

PopMatters on the other hand was indifferent in their review, and stated that the album's best redeeming feature is that it will surely "convert young metalcore fans to death metal".

The song "Embedded" is available as downloadable content for the Rock Band series.

== Track listing ==
All tracks are written by Job for a Cowboy.

No.	Title	Length
1.	"Bearing the Serpent's Lamb"	2:50
2.	"Reduced to Mere Filth"	2:58
3.	"Altered from Catechization"	4:15
4.	"Upheaval" (instrumental)	2:35
5.	"Embedded"	3:36
6.	"Strings of Hypocrisy"	2:25
7.	"Martyrdom Unsealed"	2:36
8.	"Blasphemy" (instrumental)	1:42
9.	"The Divine Falsehood"	4:24
10.	"Coalescing Prophecy"	3:26
Total length:		30:47

== Personnel ==
Job for a Cowboy

- Brent Riggs – bass guitar
- Elliott Sellers - drums
- Jonny Davy – vocals
- Bobby Thompson – guitar
- Ravi Bhadriraju – guitar

Production

- Engineering and production by Cory Spotts
- Mastering and mixed by Andy Sneap
- Artwork and layouts by Dennis Sibeijn

== Chart positions ==
Chart (2007)	Peak position
UK Independent Albums (OCC)	28
UK Rock & Metal Albums (OCC)	26
US Billboard 200	54
US Independent Albums (Billboard)	2
US Top Internet Albums (Billboard)	25
US Top Rock Albums (Billboard)	15

== Release history ==
Region	Date	Label	Format	Catalog
United States	May 15, 2007	Metal Blade Records	Compact Disc	3984-14614-2
United States	April 15, 2008	Metal Blade Records	Vinyl LP	3984-14614-1
