= Moon Healer =

Studio album by Job for a Cowboy
- Released: February 23, 2024
- Studios: Audiohammer Studios, Sanford, Florida
- Genres: Progressive death metal; technical death metal
- Length: 39:12
- Label: Metal Blade
- Producer: Jason Suecof

Job for a Cowboy chronology
Sun Eater (2014)	Moon Healer (2024)

Singles from Moon Healer
- 1. "The Agony Seeping Storm" Released: August 28, 2023

Moon Healer is the fifth studio album by American death metal band Job for a Cowboy. The album was released on February 23, 2024, through Metal Blade Records. It is the band's first album in ten years, marking the longest gap between releases in the band's history.

== Background and recording ==
The band's previous album, Sun Eater, was released on November 11, 2014.

In a 2016 interview at the NAMM Show, bassist Nick Schendzielos announced that the band was writing new music and hoped to release it sometime in 2017. However, the band would go on hiatus following 2016.

In 2019, Job for a Cowboy members Jonny Davy, Al Glassman, and Tony Sannicandro formed the deathgrind band Serpent of Gnosis with the Black Dahlia Murder bassist Max Lavelle and Deeds of Flesh drummer Darren Cesca. That same year, it was hinted that Job for a Cowboy would be returning with new music and start performing live again.

In May 2020, the band alluded to a reunion after posting a clip from the 1995 film Mortal Kombat on Twitter. Around this time, producer Jason Suecof stated that "Jonny Davy just sang me the whole new album." In June, Suecof announced that the band would begin recording new music, though the COVID-19 pandemic had slowed down production.

On January 27, 2023, it was announced that Job for a Cowboy would be performing at the Blue Ridge Rock Festival later that year in September, marking the band's first performance in seven years.

Job for a Cowboy released the song "The Agony Seeping Storm" on August 28, 2023, the band's first new song in nine years. On October 24, a second single was released, "The Forever Rot", and announced that the album would be titled Moon Healer with a release date of February 23, 2024. The album's third single, "Beyond the Chemical Doorway", was released on January 31, 2024.

== Reception ==
Professional ratings
Review scores
Source	Rating
Blabbermouth.net	8.5/10
Metal Hammer	4.5/5 stars
Metal Injection	8/10
MetalSucks	5/5 stars

Moon Healer was praised by critics upon its release. C.C. Delorean of MetalSucks awarded the album 5 out of 5 stars and stated "Simply put, Moon Healer is one of the best, most perfectly balanced technical death metal albums I've ever heard, an instant classic all but guaranteed to stay in regular rotation for quite some time." Blabbermouth writer Jay H. Gorania stated "Until now, the band's creative apex has been Sun Eater, and although at times it is too self-referential to the band's last couple of albums, Moon Healer reaches its predecessor's high-water marks in every regard."

== Track listing ==
All lyrics are written by Jonny Davy; all music is composed by Job for a Cowboy.

No.	Title	Length
1.	"Beyond the Chemical Doorway"	4:10
2.	"Etched in Oblivion"	4:14
3.	"Grinding Wheels of Ophanim"	5:52
4.	"The Sun Gave Me Ashes So I Sought Out the Moon"	4:03
5.	"Into the Crystalline Crypts"	4:21
6.	"A Sorrow-Filled Moon"	5:37
7.	"The Agony Seeping Storm"	4:11
8.	"The Forever Rot"	6:40
Total length:		39:12

== Personnel ==
Job for a Cowboy

- Jonny Davy – vocals
- Tony Sannicandro – lead guitar, guitar recording
- Al Glassman – rhythm guitar
- Nick Schendzielos – bass

Session musician

- Navene Koperweis – drums

Production

- Jason Suecof – mixing, engineering, recording
- Ermin Hamidovic – mastering, additional engineering
- Ronn Miller – additional engineering, drum technician
- Evan Sammons – additional engineering
- Tony Koehl – artwork, layout

== Charts ==
Chart (2024)	Peak position
UK Album Downloads (Official Charts)	73
UK Independent Albums (Official Charts)	43
UK Rock & Metal Albums (OCC)	17
