= Emergent (album) =

Studio album by Gordian Knot
- Released: 14 January 2003
- Studios: Wolf Studios (London); Knotwork Studios (Oregon); Beall Concert Hall (Eugene)
- Genres: Progressive metal, progressive rock
- Length: 49:48
- Label: Sensory
- Producers: Scott Burns, Sean Malone, Mark Prator

Gordian Knot chronology
Gordian Knot (1999)	Emergent (2003)

Professional ratings
Review scores
Source	Rating
Allmusic	3/5 stars
Sputnikmusic	3.8 stars on a 5 point scale

Emergent is the second (and final) album by American progressive rock band Gordian Knot, and is the only album apart from Focus to contain all original members of Cynic.

== Track listing ==
1. "Arsis" – 1:59
2. "Muttersprache" – 6:26
3. "A Shaman's Whisper" – 6:33
4. "Fischer's Gambit" – 5:43
5. "Grace" (Live) – 8:27
6. "Some Brighter Thing" – 7:34
7. "The Brook the Ocean" – 4:06
8. "Singing Deep Mountain" – 9:00
9. "Surround Me" (Japan Bonus Track) – 5:28
- All composed by Sean Malone, except 9 by Jason Göbel.
- Additional composed contributions: 3 by Glenn Snelwar; 1,2,4,6,7,8 by Bill Bruford; 1,2,4,6,7,8 by Jason Göbel; 9 by Sean Malone; 1,2,4,6,7,8,9 by Sean Reinert.

== Musicians ==
- Sean Malone (Cynic) – bass guitar (1,2,4,6,7,8,9), Chapman stick (2,3,5,8), fretless guitar (2,3,4,6,7,8), keyboards (2,3,4,6,7,8), e-bow (2,6,8), echoplex (5), loops (2,4,7), vocals (8)
- Paul Masvidal (Cynic) – guitars (3)
- Jason Göbel (ex-Cynic) – guitars (2,3,4,6,8,9)
- Jim Matheos (Fates Warning, OSI, Arch/Matheos) – acoustic guitars (4,6,8), nylon string guitar (4)
- Steve Hackett (ex-Genesis) – guitars (2,6,8)
- Bob Brunin (Aerial Surface) – guitars, fretless guitars, vocals
- Sean Reinert (ex-Cynic) – drums (3,4), v-drums (2,9)
- Bill Bruford (ex-Yes, ex-King Crimson) – drums (6,7,8), slit drum (3)
- Sonia Lynn – vocals (8)
