= Live Ruination =

EP by Job for a Cowboy
- Released: November 23, 2010
- Recorded: April 28, 2007 (tracks 2–3); June 6, 2009 (tracks 4–6)
- Venue: Worcester Palladium, Worcester, Massachusetts (tracks 2–3); First Unitarian Church, Philadelphia, Pennsylvania (tracks 4–6)
- Studio: Audiohammer Studios, Sanford, Florida (track 1)
- Genre: Death metal, deathcore
- Length: 24:22
- Label: Metal Blade

Job for a Cowboy chronology
Ruination (2009)	Live Ruination (2010)	Gloom (2011)

Live Ruination is the second EP by Job for a Cowboy. It was released on November 23, 2010, by Metal Blade Records as a digital EP on iTunes. It contains the band's live performance from a live music video shoot on June 6, 2009, at the First Unitarian Church in Philadelphia. Despite the album's title, only two songs from Ruination are on it, not including "The Matter of Splatter," which is a cover of Exhumed and a bonus track on certain versions of Ruination.

== Track listing ==
No.	Title	Writer(s)	Length
1.	"The Matter of Splatter" (Exhumed cover)	Matt Harvey, Mike Beams	3:43
2.	"Embedded"	Jonny Davy, Bobby Thompson, Ravi Bhadriraju, Brent Riggs, Elliott Sellers	3:32
3.	"Altered from Catechization"	Davy, Thompson, Bhadriraju, Riggs, Sellers	3:54
4.	"Entombment of a Machine"	Davy, Andrew Arcurio, Bhadriraju, Riggs, Sellers	4:27
5.	"Unfurling a Darkened Gospel"	Davy, Al Glassman, Bhadriraju, Riggs, Jon Rice	3:51
6.	"Regurgitated Disinformation"	Davy, Thompson, Glassman, Riggs, Rice	4:56
Total length:			24:22

Notes

- Track 1 is a b-side from Ruination
- Tracks 2 and 3 were recorded live at the 2007 New England Metal and Hardcore Festival
- Tracks 4 to 6 were recorded live at the First Unitarian Church in Philadelphia, Pennsylvania in 2009

== Personnel ==
- Jonny Davy – lead vocals
- Bobby Thompson – guitar
- Al Glassman – guitar
- Brent Riggs – bass guitar, backing vocals
- Jon Rice – drums, percussion
