= Doom (EP) =

EP by Job for a Cowboy
- Released: December 6, 2005
- Recorded: May 2005
- Studios: Blue Light Audio Media Studios in Phoenix, Arizona, U.S.
- Genre: Deathcore
- Length: 23:21
- Labels: King of the Monsters, Metal Blade
- Producer: Cory Spotts

Job for a Cowboy chronology
Demo '04 (2004)	Doom (2005)	Genesis (2007)

Doom is the debut EP by American death metal band Job for a Cowboy, released in December 2005 by King of the Monsters, an independent record label based in Scottsdale, Arizona. Doom was later reissued by Metal Blade Records in 2006 with a bonus track; "Entities". The EP is noted for being their only deathcore release, as the band would later abandon the genre in favor of a modern death metal sound. Doom is also the only release to feature guitarist Andrew Arcurio.

In 2021, Joe Smith-Engelhardt of Alternative Press included the album in his list of "30 deathcore albums from the 2000s that define the genre".

== Background ==
Doom was released on December 6, 2005 by King of the Monsters, an Arizona-based independent record label. It was then re-released by indie record label, Metal Blade Records in 2006.

The intro track "Catharsis for the Buried" features a distorted sample from the 1999 film Oxygen. A music video was created for the song "Entombment of a Machine", in which an elderly man is shown burying machines into the ground along with clips in between of the band performing in a desert-like atmosphere. It debuted as the band's first ever music video and was directed by Richie Valdez.

This is the only Job for a Cowboy release to feature their notorious "pig squeal" vocals.

== Critical reception ==
Professional ratings
Review scores
Source	Rating
Allmusic	2.5/5 stars
Tiny Mix Tapes	2/5 stars

Despite the EP's overall popularity, the release garnered generally mixed to negative reception from critics. Many of the reviewers, however, made note of the band being at the forefront of the deathcore genre, which at the time was taking off in great numbers. Allmusic reviewer Cosmo Lee stated: "Doom is competent, but trades in sounds, not songs”, referring to the fact that Job for a Cowboy had changed their musical style with their follow-up release Genesis, a purist death metal-sounding album. Lee then ended the review stating: "Almost overnight, hordes of MySpace copycats sprang up, even lifting the band's logo font. This is where it all started - or ended, depending on your perspective."

Reviewer Kobak of Tiny Mix Tapes noted that "Job for a Cowboy are incredibly talented musicians. Their songs typically go through many tempo changes, ranging from the standard cruising metal yelp to the double-bass-drum, full-on Speedy Gonzales thrash. The problem lies in their reliance on well-worn metal clichés."

The track "Knee Deep" was central to a popular YouTube video in which the track was synchronized to a clip of the SpongeBob SquarePants episode "Band Geeks". The clip features various members of the SpongeBob SquarePants cast playing instruments with "Knee Deep" overlaid to it (originally in the episode appearing as performing the song "Sweet Victory" by David Glen Eisley).

== Track listing ==
All tracks are written by Job for a Cowboy.

No.	Title	Length
1.	"Catharsis for the Buried"	0:55
2.	"Entombment of a Machine"	4:07
3.	"Relinquished"	4:49
4.	"Knee Deep"	4:30
5.	"The Rising Tide"	4:45
6.	"Suspended by the Throat"	4:15
Total length:		23:21

Reissue bonus track
No.	Title	Length
7.	"Entities"	3:58
Total length:		27:19

== Personnel ==
=== Job for a Cowboy ===
- Jonny Davy – vocals
- Ravi Bhadriraju – guitar
- Brent Riggs – bass
- Andrew Arcurio – guitar
- Elliott Sellers – drums

=== Production ===
- Cory Spotts – engineer, producer
- Cory Spotts and Andy Sneap – mixing
- Joel Lauver – mastering
