= In Dark Purity =

Studio album by Monstrosity
- Released: May 4, 1999
- Recorded: Morrisound Recording Studios, Tampa, Florida
- Genre: Death metal
- Label: Conquest Music, Inc – licensed to Olympic/Slipdisc in USA
- Producer: Monstrosity

Monstrosity chronology
| Millennium (1996) | In Dark Purity (1999) | Rise to Power (2003) |

Professional ratings
Review scores
| Source | Rating |
|---|---|
| Allmusic | 3/5 stars |

In Dark Purity is the third studio album by American death metal band Monstrosity. The first version of this album was released by German Metal Age Recordings (Turbo Rec. follow-up label). However, the label was a rip-off label and therefore Monstrosity later re-released it through The Plague Rec. as LP and CD. This album was recorded at Morrisound Recording Studio in Tampa, Florida. This is also the first album to not feature George “Corpsegrinder” Fisher on lead vocals.

== Track listing ==
| No. | Title | Writer(s) | Length |
|---|---|---|---|
| 1. | "The Hunt" | | 1:08 |
| 2. | "Destroying Divinity" | Jason Avery, Jay Fernandez, Lee Harrison | 3:26 |
| 3. | "Shapeless Domination" | Avery, Harrison | 3:29 |
| 4. | "The Angels Venom" | Avery, Fernandez, Harrison | 5:21 |
| 5. | "All Souls Consumed" | Avery, Harrison | 2:31 |
| 6. | "Dust to Dust" | Avery, Harrison | 2:40 |
| 7. | "Suffering to the Conquered" | Avery, Fernandez, Harrison | 3:37 |
| 8. | "The Eye of Judgement" | Avery, Fernandez, Harrison | 2:46 |
| 9. | "Perpetual War" | Avery, Fernandez, Harrison | 4:03 |
| 10. | "Embraced by Apathy" | Avery, Fernandez, Harrison | 2:54 |
| 11. | "Hymns of Tragedy" | Avery, Harrison | 3:28 |
| 12. | "In Dark Purity" | Avery, Harrison | 6:10 |
| 13. | "The Pillars of Drear" | Harrison | 3:43 |
| 14. | "Angel of Death" (Slayer cover) | Jeff Hanneman | 4:47 |

== Personnel ==
Monstrosity

- Jason Avery – vocals
- Tony Norman – guitars
- Jason Morgan – guitars (not credited)
- Kelly Conlon – bass
- Lee Harrison – drums

Production

- Tim Hubbard – photography
- Eric Johnson – cover art
- Monstrosity – producer
- Jim Ward Morris – engineer, digital editing
- Jose Perez – logo
