= Spiritual Apocalypse =

Studio album by Monstrosity
- Released: April 5, 2007
- Recorded: 2006–2007
- Genre: Death metal
- Length: 46:02
- Label: Metal Blade

Monstrosity chronology
Rise to Power (2003)	Spiritual Apocalypse (2007)	The Passage of Existence (2018)

Professional ratings
Review scores
Source	Rating
Sputnikmusic	4/5 stars

Spiritual Apocalypse is the fifth full-length album by Floridian death metal band Monstrosity. Critics were overwhelmingly positive. The album cover art is by David Ho.

== Track listing ==
All lyrics by Lee Harrison.

No.	Title	Music	Length
1.	"Spiritual Apocalypse"	Harrison	4:02
2.	"Firestorm" (featuring Kelly Shaefer of Atheist)	Harrison	4:48
3.	"Apostles of the Endless Night"	English	5:51
4.	"Within Divisions of Darkness"	Harrison	4:19
5.	"The Inhuman Race" (featuring Kelly Shaefer of Atheist)	Harrison, English	5:12
6.	"Remnants of Divination"	English	6:11
7.	"Illumination"		0:46
8.	"Sacred Oblivion"	English	3:00
9.	"The Bloodline Horror"	Harrison, English	6:23
10.	"Triumph in Black"	Harrison	5:30
Total length:			46:02

== Personnel ==
Monstrosity

- Mike Hrubovcak – vocals
- Mark English – guitars
- Mike Poggione – bass
- Lee Harrison – drums

Additional musicians

- Kelly Shaefer of Atheist – guest vocals
- Matt LaPorte – guitars
- Jason Suecof – ending guitar solo on "The Bloodline Horror"
- James Malone – ending guitar solo on "The Bloodline Horror"
- John Zahner – keyboards
