= George Fisher (musician) =

American death metal vocalist

George "Corpsegrinder" Fisher
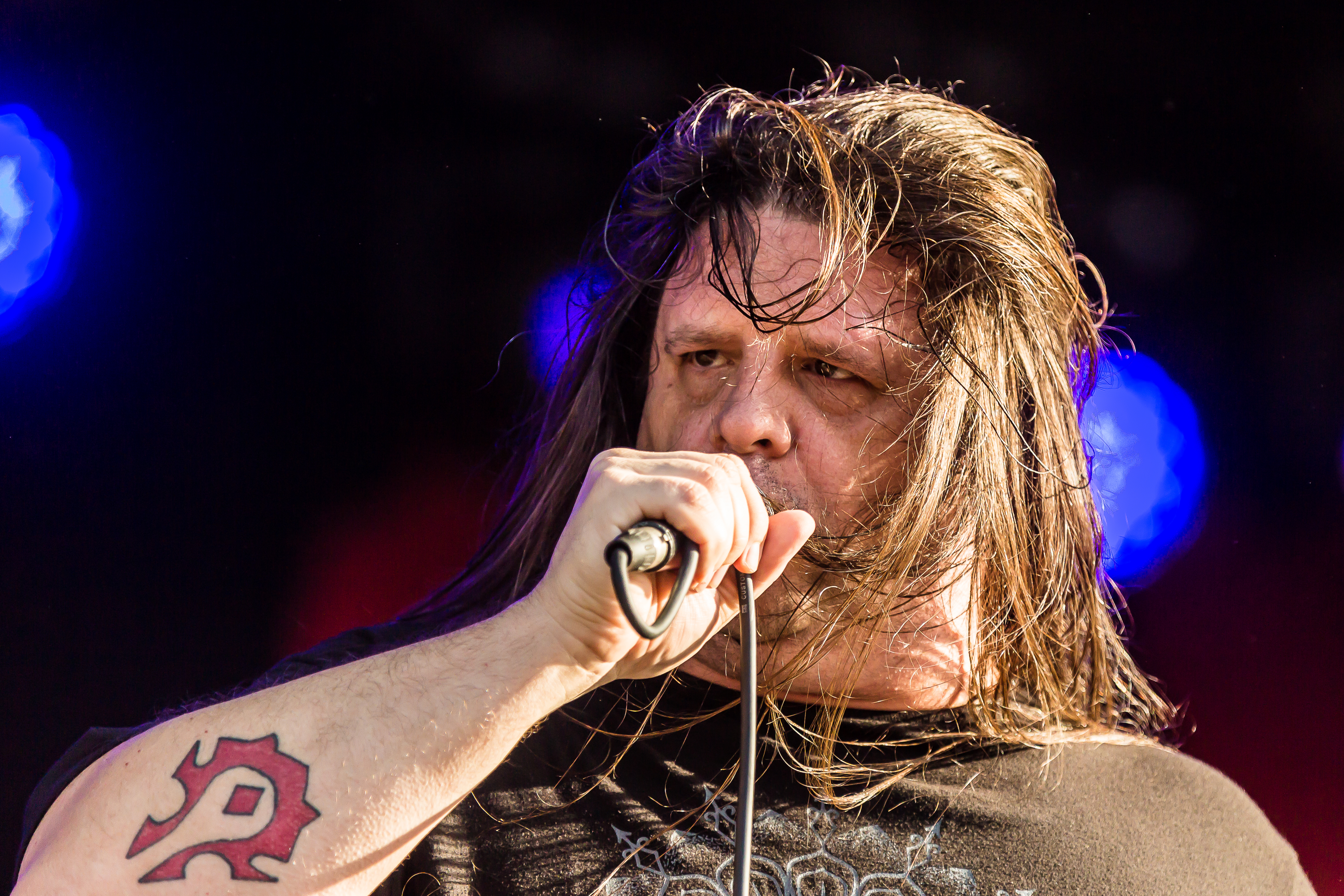
- Fisher with Cannibal Corpse in 2019

Background information
- Born: July 8, 1970 (age 56); Baltimore, Maryland, U.S.
- Genres: Death metal
- Occupations: Vocalist; songwriter
- Years active: 1988–present
- Member of: Cannibal Corpse; Paths of Possession; Serpentine Dominion; Voodoo Gods
- Formerly of: Monstrosity
- Website: thecorpsegrinder.com

George Fisher (born July 8, 1970), better known by his stage name Corpsegrinder, is an American death metal vocalist who is the lead singer of Cannibal Corpse, Paths of Possession, and the supergroup Serpentine Dominion.

Prior to Cannibal Corpse, he served as lead vocalist in the Florida death metal band Monstrosity, with which he released two albums - Imperial Doom and Millenium in 1992 and 1996, respectively. Fisher joined Cannibal Corpse midway through the recording sessions of their fifth studio album Vile, which became his first album with the band. He performed on eleven studio releases by the band since then.

Fisher is known for the size of his neck, which he has explained is due to a combination of headbanging and weightlifting when he was younger. His neck size is an internet meme. He runs a line of T-shirts that bear the slogan "Respect the Neck".

== Early life ==
Fisher was born in Baltimore, Maryland, on July 8, 1970. He developed an interest in horror fiction and comic books at an early age. He taught himself how to sing by attempting to emulate the vocal performances of his influences, such as Tom Araya of Slayer, Chuck Schuldiner of Death, Glen Benton of Deicide, John Tardy of Obituary, and Dave Vincent of Morbid Angel. He recalled, "My vocal coaches were basically all my records - any record that had the photo of the band or the lyrics on the back of the cover, I would line them up in my room." Fisher has stated that during his formative years, he was determined to learn the entirety of the lyrics to the albums and songs he was attempting to emulate. He recalled, "my friends were like, 'Man, you know all the lyrics and you sing them in time?' Even if I'm not singing them like they do. I guess it started coming around in my head, this is what I want to do."

== Career ==
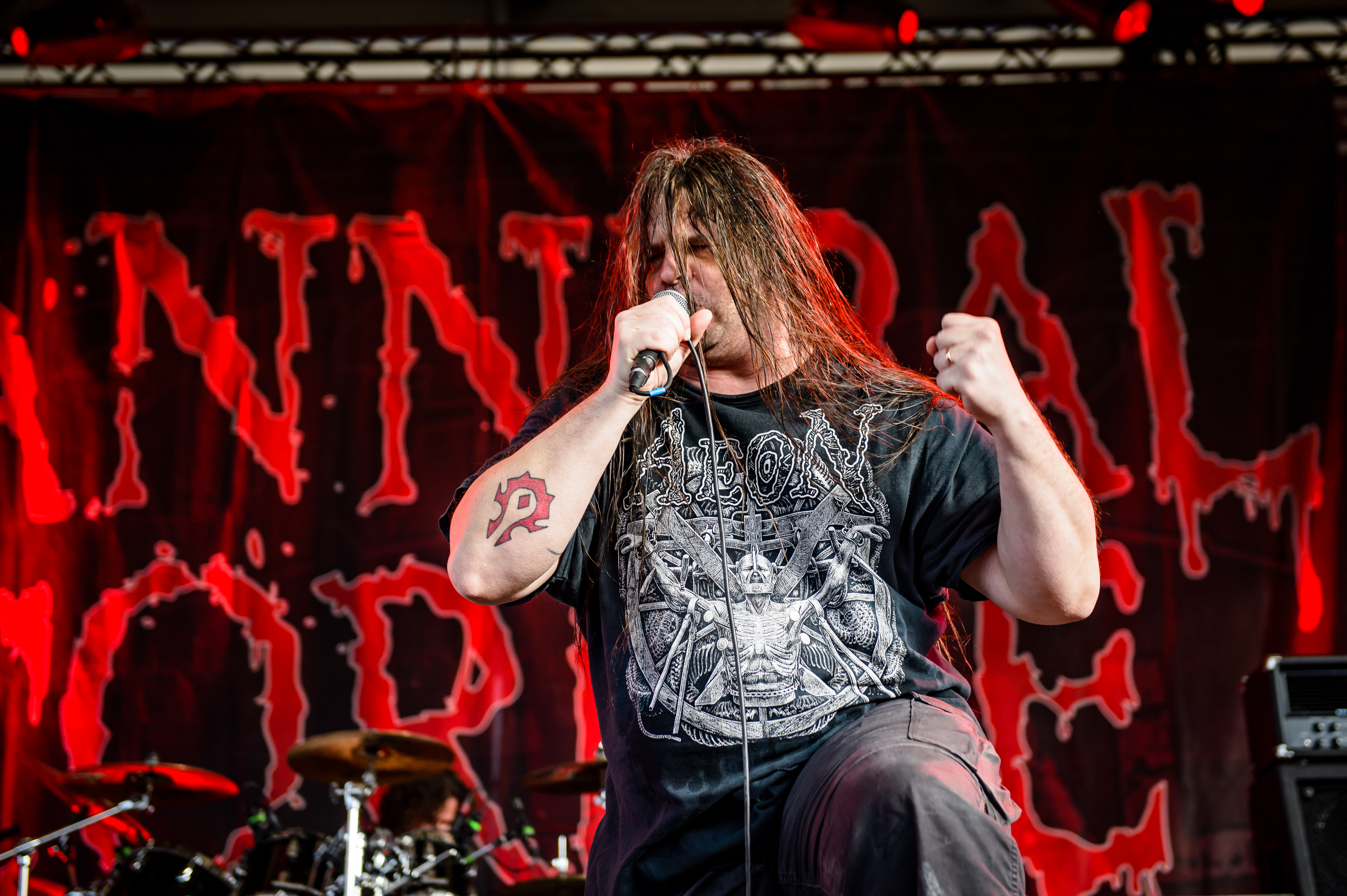
Corpsegrinder performing at Rock Hard Festival in Germany, 2016

=== Early career ===
Fisher formed his first band "Corpsegrinder" in 1988, before turning 18. The band was composed of people Fisher and a friend had met while partying in a hotel. The name "Corpsegrinder" comes from a song of the same name on Death's 1984 demo Reign of Terror, which Fisher would later adopt as his stage name. The band began playing shows in the Baltimore area during February 1988, playing Cro-Mags and Sacrifice covers. In 1991, Fisher made his first official studio appearance on Suffocation's Effigy of the Forgotten; his vocals can be heard on the songs "Mass Obliteration" and "Reincremation".

=== Monstrosity ===
Fisher received a call from Ted Hartz asking him to record vocals on a demo, after the latter had been fired from the band Exmortis. After some hesitation, Fisher decided to leave Corpsegrinder to join Hartz, feeling his bandmates in Corpsegrinder did not share his level of dedication for death metal. Fisher performed lead vocals on Monstrosity's first two studio albums, Imperial Doom and Millennium. He left the band to join Cannibal Corpse in 1995.

=== Cannibal Corpse (1995–present) ===
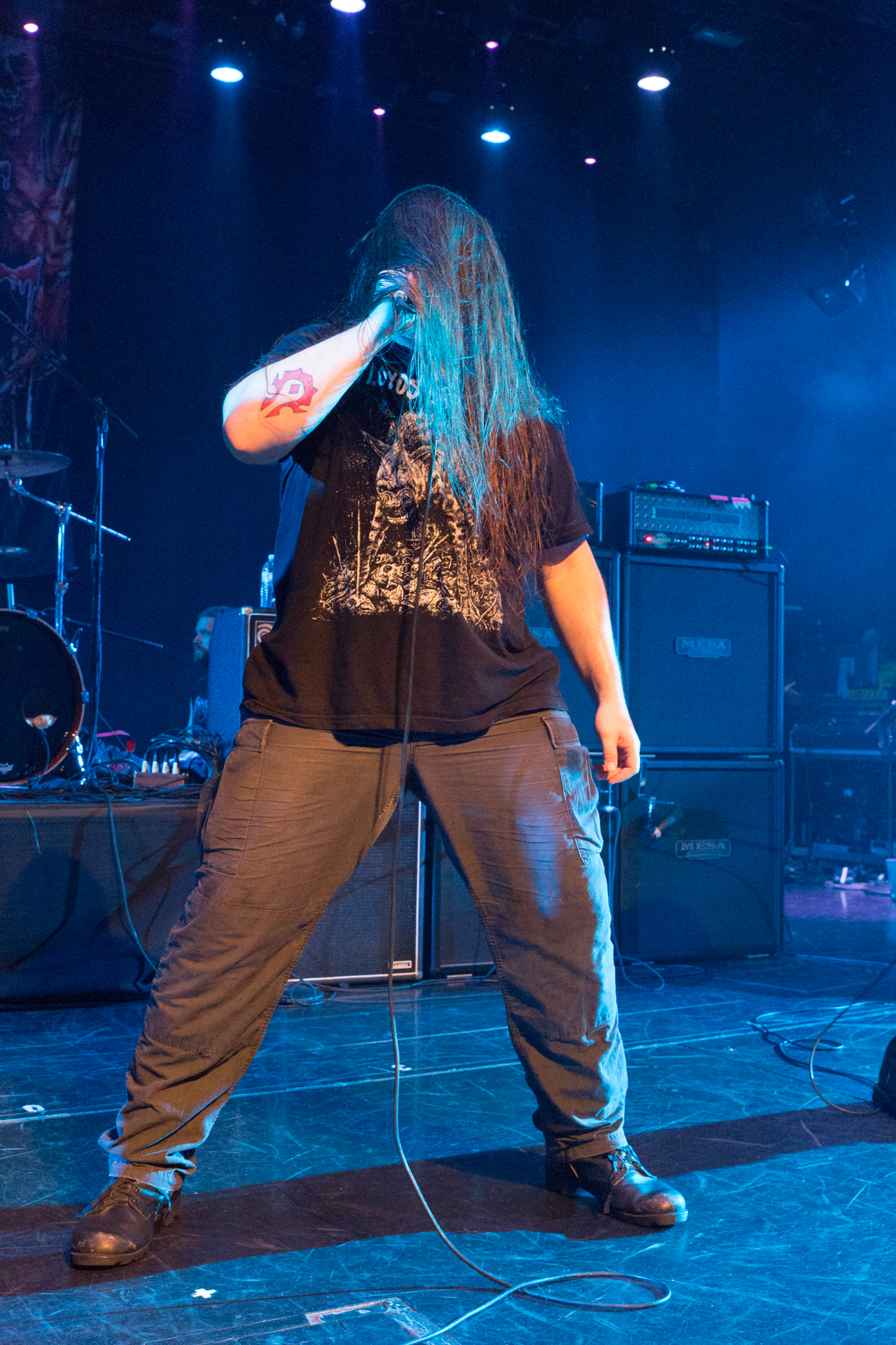
Corpsegrinder performing with Cannibal Corpse in 2015

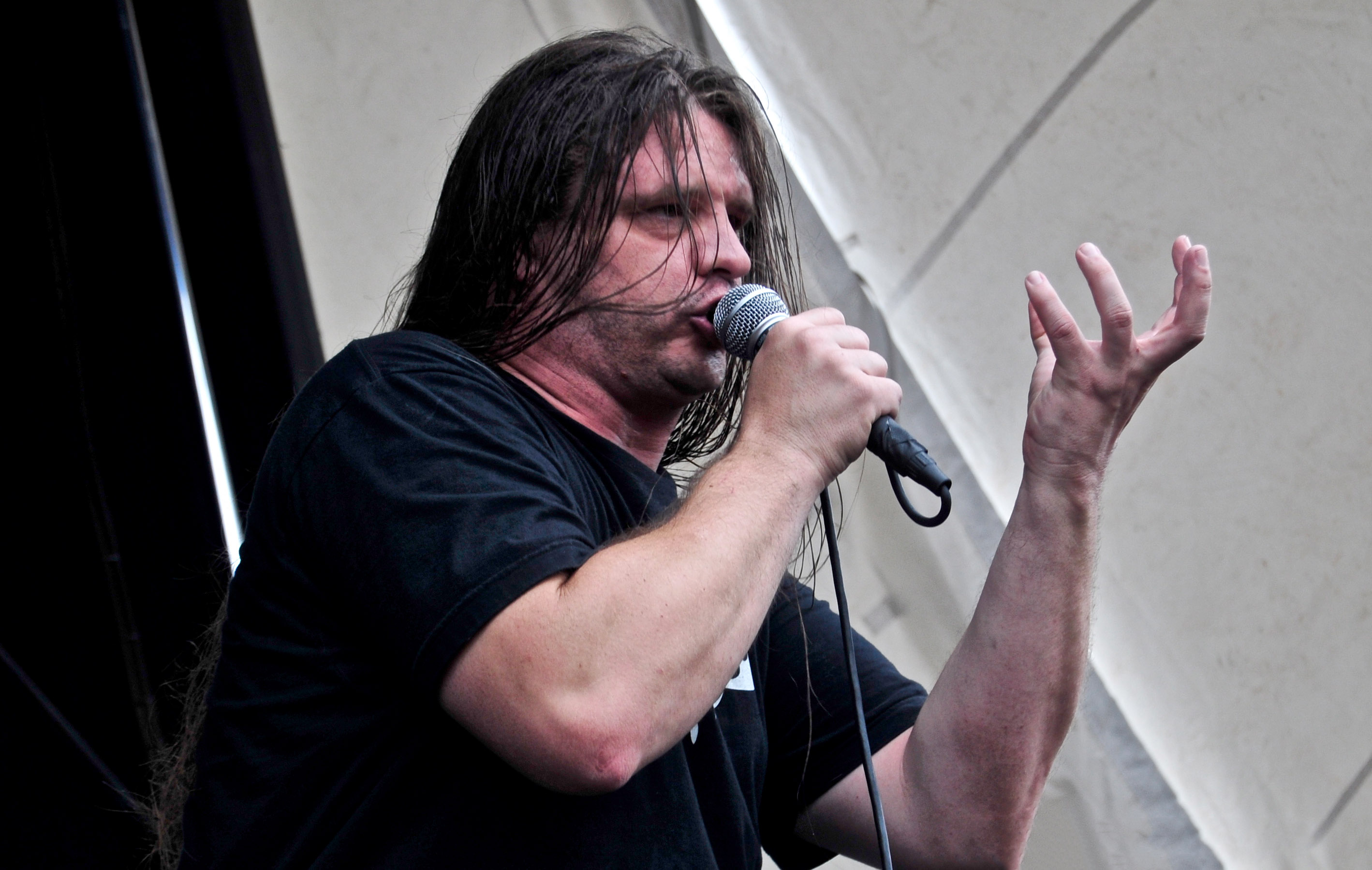
Corpsegrinder performing at Mayhem Fest in Hartford, Connecticut in 2009

Fisher initially met Chris Barnes, Alex Webster and Paul Mazurkiewicz at a Cannibal Corpse show in Washington, D.C. Fisher left Monstrosity in late 1995 and joined Cannibal Corpse, replacing Barnes on vocals in the band after Webster called Fisher and gave him the offer. Fisher reportedly screamed in excitement, which alarmed his mother. Fisher also claims he did not know he was an official member of the band until Vile was completed. Fisher said, "I knew what I could do and what I could bring to the band. It would be a different style, for sure, but I only asked for fans to give me a chance and check out the record or a live show and be open-minded. I think they did that and I am grateful, and here we are." Mazurkiewicz said, "We're very adamant in our view that you can listen back to back and you can tell who's better."

=== Corpsegrinder (2022–present) ===
Fisher released his debut solo album, Corpsegrinder, on February 25, 2022.

=== Other projects ===
Fisher has also provided guest vocals for California deathcore band Suicide Silence on the song "Control" from their fourth album, You Can't Stop Me. Fisher also performed guest vocals on Job for a Cowboy's 2014 album Sun Eater on the song "The Synthetic Sea". In 2021, Fisher performed guest vocals for Boston metalcore band Ice Nine Kills on the song "Take Your Pick" from the band's album The Silver Scream 2: Welcome to Horrorwood. Fisher did guest vocals for Shadow of Intent's song "Feeding the Meatgrinder" from their 2025 album, Imperium Delirium.

In 2009, Killswitch Engage guitarist Adam Dutkiewicz wrote songs for Fisher and asked him to perform vocals over them. This eventually led to him and Dutkiewicz forming Serpentine Dominion alongside Shannon Lucas. They released their debut self titled album in 2016.

Fisher does occasional guest appearances in the animated series Metalocalypse where he voices the Metal Masked Assassin. He was also the inspiration for the character Nathan Explosion, the lead vocalist for Dethklok, who has a similar physical appearance and performance style to Corpsegrinder.

== Artistry ==
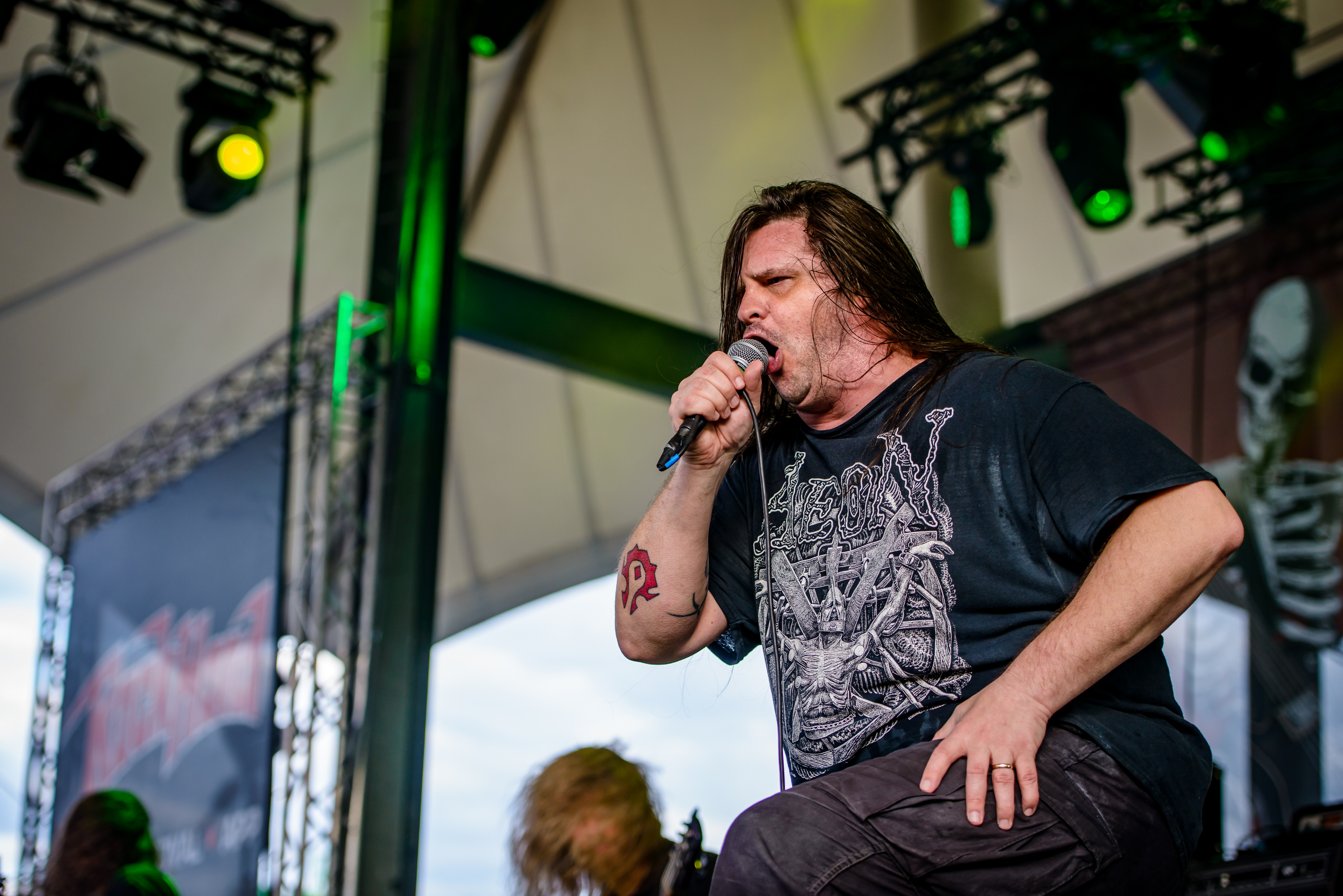
Corpsegrinder performing at Rock Hard Festival in Germany, 2016

=== Vocal style and influences ===
Fisher is known for his death growls, high shrieks and rapid-fire vocal delivery style. His vocals have been described as sounding like "[his] larynx is being put through a garbage disposal." His high screams has drawn comparisons to those of Chuck Schuldiner of Death. He is also noted for the clarity and intelligibility of his vocal delivery. According to Joseph Schafer of Decibel: "His blast-furnace bellow can’t be mistaken. Even crazier, he can deliver it at hip-hop battle speed, enunciating each foul syllable to the point where he’s also one of death metal’s most accessible singers." As an extreme metal vocalist, Fisher has stated his belief that the only feasible application of his voice within mainstream popular entertainment would possibly be voice acting for monsters in video games.

Fisher has stated that his interest in metal music started with Black Sabbath. He later moved on to other British heavy metal bands such as Iron Maiden, Judas Priest, and Saxon, and then ultimately, extreme metal acts such as Venom, Slayer, Possessed, Kreator and Celtic Frost. He said his musical tastes "just got heavier and heavier." Additionally, he is an outspoken fan of metal bands such as Death, Morbid Angel, Napalm Death, Sodom, Dark Angel, Dethklok, Motörhead, Autopsy, Deicide, Dio, Mercyful Fate, Megadeth, and Metallica. "I listen to a lot of straight edge stuff, you know, from the eighties." He is a self-professed fan of live albums, citing Judas Priest's Unleashed in the East and Iron Maiden's Live After Death among some of his favorites, along with live releases by Sodom and Deicide.

=== Live performances ===
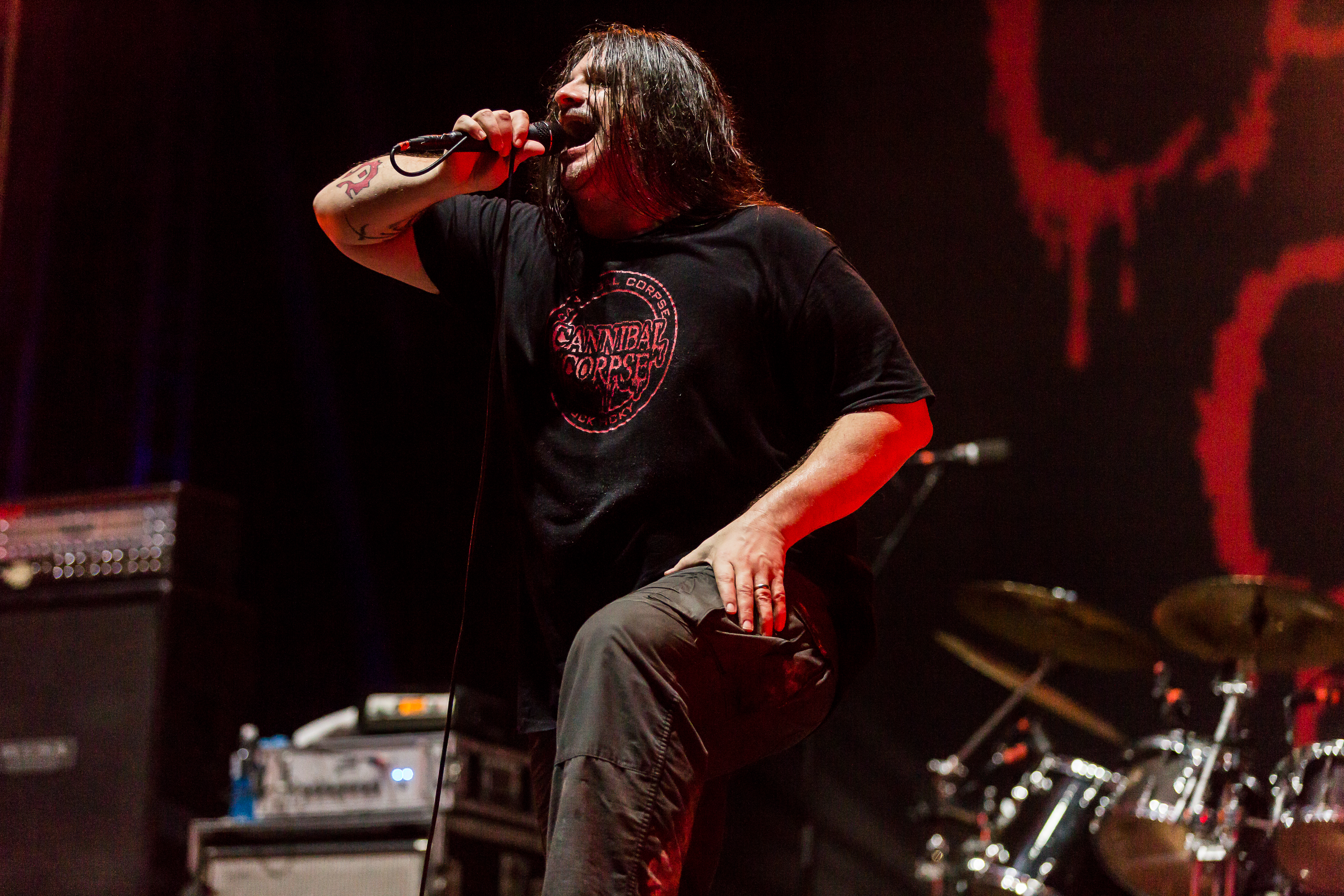
Corpsegrinder performing with Cannibal Corpse at Full Force in 2019

Fisher has been known for his aggressive tirades onstage in response to heckling from audience members, which he has stated is a part of his stage persona. He said: "The Barnes thing eventually stopped happening but then people shouted things because they want the reaction, because I've been famous for chewing people out onstage. Someone threw a quarter at me in San Diego – there's a video of that online and I hope my mother never watched it because it’s pretty crazy. I threatened to kill their dog and everybody they knew. The crowd went crazy but I think most people started to realise that I'm full of shit. I'm not some super-sick fighter guy that's going to come offstage and do some Mortal Kombat moves. I detest violence. I watch boxing and that's all good, but I'd rather never be in a physical altercation ever again. I'm not saying I'm some pacifist. If you come up and smack me in the face you're going to have a problem, but I'm not a violent person."

Fisher has stated that he does not perform warm-up exercises or soundchecks before performing live. He has also expressed his belief that vocalists who "cup the mic" are not performing what he considers "true death metal singing," as it requires less skill with diaphragm usage and breathing. He stated that he was not even aware of the technique when he was teaching himself to sing, because many of his vocal influences, such as Chuck Schuldiner, were playing guitar in addition to singing.

== Public image ==
The size of Fisher's neck has become a popular internet meme. MetalSucks said his neck is "the stuff of legends." Loudwire stated that "not even Corey Taylor’s neck would win in a fight to the death with Corpsegrinder’s esophagus." Fisher himself believes that his name is synonymous with his neck and his headbanging style. When asked by Metal Hammer if he ever grew tired of being remembered for his neck, he said: "No, it's part of me. I can't be jealous of my neck – what would I do without it? Some women who in the adult industry have their money-makers. I sing in Cannibal Corpse, and my neck's my money-maker. I spin my neck to make my money. [...] There are worse things to be remembered for. I could be remembered for being a complete asshole."

Loudwire placed Fisher at number 7 on their list of the "Top 25 Extreme Metal Vocalists", calling him "one of death metal’s most imposing frontmen from a physical and vocal perspective." In 2025, Revolver included Fisher in their list of "16 Greatest Replacement Singers in Heavy-Music History". Staff writer Eli Enis stated that "beyond his voice, the man’s giant stature, superior head-banging skills and affable sense of humor make him a great face of a band as grisly and over-the-top as Cannibal Corpse."

Fisher made an appearance at BlizzCon 2011 where he performed alongside Level 90 Elite Tauren Chieftain, a band made up of Blizzard Entertainment employees. Fisher was referenced in the game when Blizzard introduced a non-player character named "Gorge the Corpsegrinder" into the Wrath of the Lich King expansion in 2008. The character was later renamed to "Annihilator Grek'lor" in 2021, coinciding with the emergence of allegedly homophobic remarks about the Alliance faction made by Fisher in a 2007 interview. Neither Fisher or Blizzard have commented publicly on the matter.

== Personal life and views ==
Fisher was born in Baltimore, Maryland. He is married and has two daughters. Contrary to the subject matter of his music, Fisher's personal life (viewed largely through his Instagram page) has been noted to be "wholesome", showing him as a father with his children at Walt Disney World and with large plush toys; he himself has noted an affinity towards winning plush animals from claw machine games, which he then often donates to charity.

Fisher is apolitical and has never voted in an election. He said: "I never will, ‘cause I don’t trust one of ‘em. And that might be stupid on my part, but I haven’t seen anything since I’ve been born to make me believe that every single thing that they say they’re gonna do, they try to do. I mean, some of it’s just a load of [bullshit]. However, he expressed support to NFL players taking the knee. According to him: "Maybe some people wouldn’t like my opinion about things. I obviously have opinions about things happening in the world, but for the most part, I’m just not going to be an activist. I definitely believe that there are people who are wrong, and I believe that there are people who have been wronged."

Fisher is irreligious, denouncing religion as "a scam". Regarding Christianity and Jesus Christ, he was quoted saying:

"Maybe the man was real, maybe he wasn’t. But I don’t think he was waving wands, walking on water – you know – doing any of the things that they say he was. [...] The Bible was created by man – and not for man today. It was created by those people to manipulate people and used over centuries to manipulate people. That’s all it’s ever gonna do. You look at all these Catholic priests. Look what they did. You know? And you know who covered it up? The church. Lying scum. You know who Satan is? It’s those people. Satan represents all the bad in this world. It’s definitely those people. More people died in the name of religion and, of course, you can’t blame that on Jesus or God, but gimme a break. I don’t believe in none of that hullabaloo or whatever you wanna call it."

Fisher is an avid fan of the online role-playing game World of Warcraft; he has a tattoo representing the Horde, one of the factions in the game, on his right forearm and added the phrase "Fuck the Alliance" to the liner notes of the 2006 Cannibal Corpse album Kill.

Fisher has stated that he has never smoked at any point in his life.

Outside of heavy metal, Fisher has expressed appreciation for Twenty One Pilots, hip hop group N.W.A and Irish rock band the Cranberries.

Fisher is a fan of the Washington Wizards and the Denver Broncos.

== Discography ==
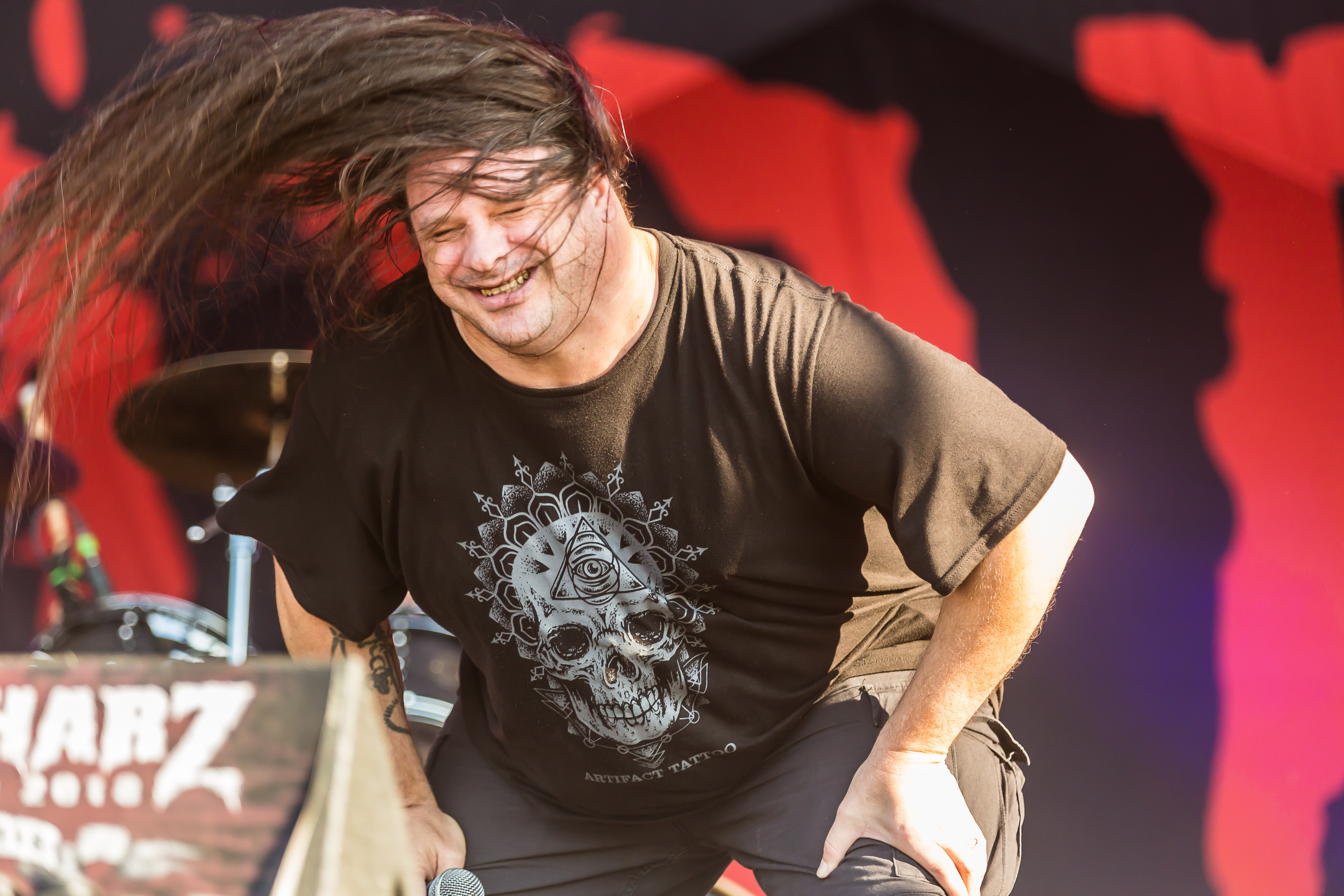
Corpsegrinder performing with Cannibal Corpse

Cannibal Corpse

- Vile (1996)
- Gallery of Suicide (1998)
- Bloodthirst (1999)
- Gore Obsessed (2002)
- The Wretched Spawn (2004)
- Kill (2006)
- Evisceration Plague (2009)
- Torture (2012)
- A Skeletal Domain (2014)
- Red Before Black (2017)
- Violence Unimagined (2021)
- Chaos Horrific (2023)

Corpsegrinder

- Corpsegrinder (2022)

Monstrosity

- Imperial Doom (1992)
- Millennium (1996)

Paths of Possession

- The Crypt of Madness (2003)
- Promises in Blood (2005)
- The End of the Hour (2007)

Voodoo Gods

- Anticipation for Blood Leveled in Darkness (2014)
- The Divinity of Blood (2020)

Serpentine Dominion

- Serpentine Dominion (2016)

Dethklok

- The Doomstar Requiem (2013) – voice of Metal Masked Assassin

Suicide Silence

- You Can't Stop Me (2014) – guest vocals on track "Control"

Job for a Cowboy

- Sun Eater (2014) – guest vocals on track "The Synthetic Sea"

Suffocation

- Effigy of the Forgotten (1991) - guest vocals on tracks "Mass Obliteration" and "Reincremation"

Ektomorf

- Aggressor (2015) - guest vocals on track "Evil by Nature"

Heaven Shall Burn

- Wanderer (2016) - guest vocals on track "Prey to God"

Transmetal

- México Bárbaro (1996) - guest vocals on tracks "México Bárbaro" and "Ceveline"

Igorrr

- Spirituality and Distortion (2020) - guest vocals on track "Parpaing"

Deeds of Flesh

- Nucleus (2020) - guest vocals on track "Ethereal Ancestors"

Dee Snider

- Leave a Scar (2021) - guest vocals on track "Time to Choose"

Ice Nine Kills

- The Silver Scream 2: Welcome to Horrorwood (2021) - guest vocals on track "Take Your Pick"

Revocation

- Netherheaven (2022) - guest vocals on track "Re-Crucified"

Terror

- Pain Into Power (2022) - guest vocals on track "Can't Help But Hate"

Body Count

- Merciless (2024) - guest vocals on track "The Purge"

Shadow of Intent

- Imperium Delirium (2025) - guest vocals on track "Feeding the Meatgrinder"
