= Sun Eater =

- Cover artwork by Tony Koehl

Studio album by Job for a Cowboy
- Released: November 11, 2014
- Studios: Audiohammer Studios, Sanford, FL, USA
- Genres: Progressive death metal; technical death metal
- Length: 46:41
- Label: Metal Blade
- Producer: Jason Suecof

Job for a Cowboy chronology
Demonocracy (2012)	Sun Eater (2014)	Moon Healer (2024)

Professional ratings
Review scores
Source	Rating
About.com	4/5 stars
Exclaim!	6/10
Metal Hammer	8/10
Metal Storm	8.5/10

Sun Eater is the fourth studio album by American death metal band Job for a Cowboy. It was released on November 11, 2014, by Metal Blade Records. The album features session musician Danny Walker on drums, and Cannibal Corpse vocalist George "Corpsegrinder" Fisher guested on the song "The Synthetic Sea".

The album entered the US Billboard 200 at number 91, selling 3,900 copies in the first week.

== Composition ==
Sun Eater has been described as the point Job for a Cowboy fully abandoned their deathcore roots, featuring a more progressive and technical death metal sound with elements of death-doom.

== Track listing ==
All tracks are written by Job for a Cowboy, except where noted.

No.	Title	Writer(s)	Length
1.	"Eating the Visions of God"		6:30
2.	"Sun of Nihility"		5:33
3.	"The Stone Cross"		3:40
4.	"The Synthetic Sea (feat. George "Corpsegrinder" Fisher)"		4:50
5.	"A Global Shift"		3:58
6.	"The Celestial Antidote"	Bobby Thompson	6:08
7.	"Encircled by Mirrors"		4:46
8.	"Buried Monuments"		4:56
9.	"Worming Nightfall"		6:20
Total length:			46:41

== Personnel ==
Credits are adapted from the album liner notes, except where noted.

Job for a Cowboy

- Jonny Davy – vocals
- Tony Sanicandro – guitar
- Al Glassman – guitar
- Nick Schendzielos – bass

Session musicians

- Danny Walker – drums

Additional musicians

- George "Corpsegrinder" Fisher – vocals on "The Synthetic Sea"
- Jason Suecof – guitar solo on "Sun of Nihility"

Production

- Jason Suecof – production, engineering, mixing
- Peter Sanicandro – production (asst)
- Ronn Miller – drum tech, engineering (asst)
- Eyal Levi – additional engineering
- John Douglass – additional engineering
- Stinky – additional engineering

Visual art

- Tony Koehl – cover art
- Brian J. Ames – layout

== Charts ==
Chart (2014)	Peak position
US Billboard 200	91
US Independent Albums (Billboard)	12
US Top Hard Rock Albums (Billboard)	6
US Top Rock Albums (Billboard)	20
