= Monstrosity (band) =

American death metal band

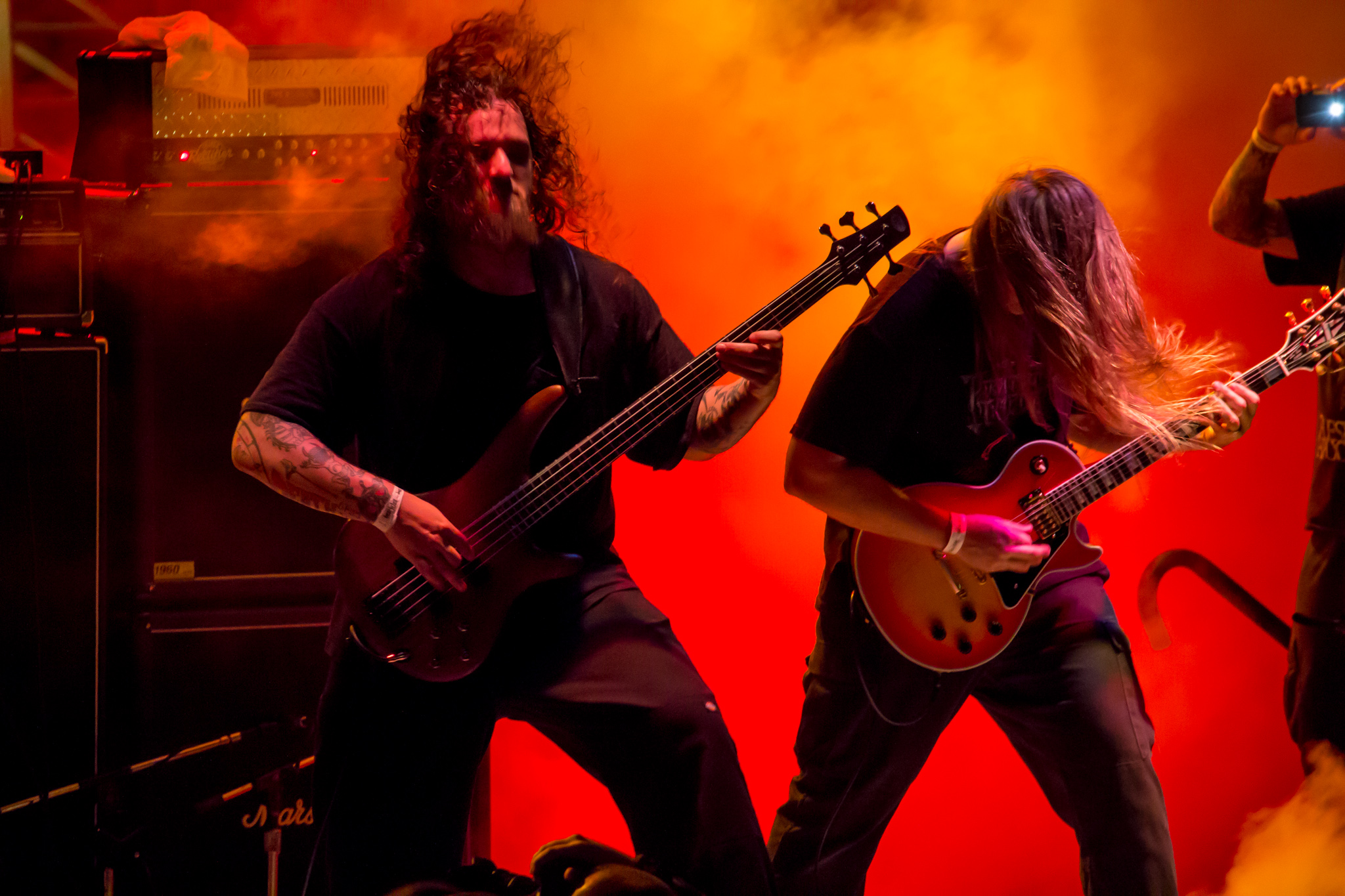
- Monstrosity performing in 2012

Background information
- Origin: Fort Lauderdale, Florida, U.S.
- Genres: Death metal, technical death metal
- Years active: 1990–present
- Labels: Nuclear Blast; Conquest
- Members: Lee Harrison; Mark Van Erp; Matt Barnes; Justin Walker; Edwin Webb
- Past members: Jon Rubin; George "Corpsegrinder" Fisher; Jason Morgan; Kelly Conlon; Jason Avery; Tony Norman; Mike Poggione; Sam Molina; Mark English; Mike Hrubovcak
- Website: monstrosity.us

Monstrosity is an American death metal band. Formed in 1990 in Fort Lauderdale, Florida as part of the larger Florida death metal scene, drummer Lee Harrison, bassist Mark Van Erp, and vocalist George "Corpsegrinder" Fisher were founding members. The group has undergone multiple lineup changes. Harrison is the only constant member. Edwin Webb is the fifth and current vocalist. Van Erp rejoined the band in 2021 after departing in 1995.

In 1995, shortly before his second album with Monstrosity was released, Fisher became the vocalist of death metal band Cannibal Corpse, and was replaced with Jason Avery.

Monstrosity has released seven studio albums, most recently Screams from Beneath the Surface (2026), following an eight-year gap. Despite a dedicated cult following, their commercial success has been limited to some albums appearing on CMJ college radio charts.

== History ==
=== Formation and Imperial Doom ===
Vocalist George "Corpsegrinder" Fisher, drummer Lee Harrison, and bassist Mark Van Erp founded Monstrosity in 1990. Harrison had just left New York death metal band Malevolent Creation, and Fisher left his band, Corpsegrinder, in his Baltimore hometown, and relocated to Florida in 1990. Jon Rubin, who had played guitar in Malevolent Creation, joined to form Monstrosity. Mark Van Erp played bass in the band Cynic, which he left to join Monstrosity. Monstrosity signed with German label Nuclear Blast.

Monstrosity played their first shows during fall 1990, when the Florida death metal scene was already established.

Jason Gobel, a member of Cynic, assisted Monstrosity in the recording of Imperial Doom, despite never being an official member. The album was released in 1992 by Nuclear Blast. To support the album, Monstrosity toured Europe as support for Pestilence.

=== Lineup changes and Millenium ===
After a number of problems with the label, Lee Harrison formed his own record label, Conquest Music, in 1996. The band released their sophomore album, Millennium, in 1996. Guitarist Jon Rubin was replaced with Jason Morgan and bassist Mark Van Erp with Kelly Conlon. Following the recording sessions for the album, Fisher left Monstrosity to replace Chris Barnes in Cannibal Corpse, and was replaced with singer Jason Avery in Monstrosity.

=== Later releases (1999-present) ===
In 1999, Monstrosity released their third studio album, In Dark Purity. The album was produced by Monstrosity and recorded at Morrisound Studios, Tampa, Florida. Conquest Music licensed the album to Olympic/Slip Disc/Century Media for better distribution in the US and licensed the album to Metal Age and then Hammerheart Records in Europe. Jason Avery sang, Lee Harrison drummed, Tony Norman played the guitar, and Kelly Conlon played bass.

By 2004, Monstrosity recorded their fourth studio album, Rise to Power, at Audio Hammer Studio, Sanford, Florida.The album was produced by Lee Harrison and co-produced by Monstrosity, and engineered by Jason Suecof. Monstrosity toured the US to support the album and were invited by the Bogotá, Colombia government to headline a musical festival in Bogotá with 85,000 people in attendance.

Avery was replaced in December 2005 with Brian Werner. Werner sang on the band's 2006 European tour and subsequent U.S. shows. In December 2006, Werner was replaced with Mike Hrubovcak (Divine Rapture, Imperial Crystalline Entombment, Vile) and guitarist Mark English joined the band.

The band released its fifth studio album, Spiritual Apocalypse, in 2008, followed by its sixth studio album eleven years later, The Passage of Existence, on September 7, 2018.

On January 21, 2026, the band announced their seventh album, Screams from Beneath the Surface, set for release on March 13. The band toured Europe with Bio Cancer, Reject The Sickness, and Deadwood in April and May of 2026.

== Band members ==
Current members

- Lee Harrison – drums (1990–present)
- Matt Barnes – rhythm guitar (2010–present)
- Justin Walker – lead guitar (2019–present)
- Mark van Erp – bass (1990–1995, 2021–present; touring 2014–2021)
- Edwin Webb – vocals (2021–present)

Former members

- Jon Rubin – guitars (1990–1994)
- George "Corpsegrinder" Fisher – vocals (1990–1996)
- Jason "Tux" Morgan – guitars (1994–1999)
- Tony Norman – lead guitar (1999–2005)
- Kelly Conlon – bass (1995–2000)
- Jason Avery – vocals (1996–2001, 2003–2005)
- Mike Poggione – bass (2001–2021)
- Sam Molina – rhythm guitar (2003–2006), vocals (2001–2003)
- Mark English – lead guitar (2006–2019)
- Mike Hrubovcak – vocals (2006–2021)

Touring members

- Pat O'Brien – lead guitar (1996–1997)
- Jay Fernandez – guitars (1998–1999)
- Bobby Earl – vocals (2001)
- Patrick Hall – guitars (2002)
- Brian Werner – vocals (2006)
- J.J. Hrubovcak – guitars (2007)
- Ben Kuzay – bass (2008)
- Andrew Guthrie – bass (2012)
- Jamie Harris – guitars (1998)
- Jamie Osburne – guitars (1998)
- Matt Moore – guitars (2009)
- Steve Bailey – guitars (2000)
- Chuck Amos – guitars (1994)
- Adam Bollenbach – guitars (1993)
- Jason Gobel – guitars (1991)

== Discography ==
=== Studio albums ===
- Imperial Doom (1992)
- Millennium (1996)
- In Dark Purity (1999)
- Rise to Power (2003)
- Spiritual Apocalypse (2007)
- The Passage of Existence (2018)
- Screams from Beneath the Surface (2026)

=== EPs and singles ===
- Burden of Evil (1991)
- Darkest Dream (1992)

=== Compilations ===
- Enslaving the Masses (2001)

=== Live albums ===
- Live Extreme Brazilian – Tour 2002 (2003)
- 10 Years of Nuclear Blast (1997)
- Stages Of Decay (2001)

=== DVDs ===
- Live Apocalypse (2012)

=== Demo albums ===
- Horror Infinity (1990)
- Slaves and Masters (1994)
