= Imperial Doom =

Studio album by Monstrosity
- Released: May 26, 1992
- Recorded: Morrisound Recording Studios, Tampa, Florida
- Genre: Death metal
- Length: 35:20
- Label: Nuclear Blast
- Producer: Jim Morris, Monstrosity

Monstrosity chronology
Imperial Doom (1992)	Millennium (1996)

Professional ratings
Review scores
Source	Rating
Metal Forces	75/100

Imperial Doom is the debut album by Florida death metal band Monstrosity. It was released on May 26, 1992, through Nuclear Blast. The album sold 40,000 copies worldwide and received excellent ratings in the press. The album was supported by a European tour, but a little later, following disagreements regarding royalties, Monstrosity left Nuclear Blast.

== Reception and legacy ==
Eduardo Rivadavia of Loudwire said in 2015: "Musically, the quintet shared Morbid Angel’s penchant for technical mastery, concentrated power, and intellectual heresy, and they probably languished in their shadow, as a result. But 1992’s Imperial Doom was a death metal humdinger in its own right, full of promising qualities that were unfortunately derailed when Monstrosity’s lineup collapsed, killing all their momentum." Joe DiVita, also writing for Loudwire, said in 2017: "This one gets a little lost among the all-time classics Florida would produce in a short timespan, but Imperial Doom still holds up as a scavenging dose of death metal for those days when the old standbys feel a little worn out."

== Track listing ==
- All lyrics by Lee Harrison. All music as noted.

No.	Title	Music	Length
1.	"Imperial Doom"	Monstrosity	4:12
2.	"Definitive Inquisition"	Harrison, Mark Van Erp	4:09
3.	"Ceremonial Void"	Monstrosity	3:59
4.	"Immense Malignancy"	Monstrosity	3:40
5.	"Vicious Mental Thirst"	Monstrosity	4:17
6.	"Burden of Evil"	Harrison, Van Erp	3:22
7.	"Horror Infinity"	Monstrosity	4:54
8.	"Final Cremation"	Monstrosity	3:22
9.	"Darkest Dream"	Monstrosity	3:09
Total length:			35:20

== Personnel ==
Monstrosity

- George "Corpsegrinder" Fisher – vocals
- Jon Rubin – guitars
- Mark Van Erp – bass
- Lee Harrison – drums

Additional personnel

- Jason Gobel – guitars

Production

- Monstrosity – production
- Jim Morris – recording, engineering, production
- Dan Seagrave – artwork
- Markus Staiger – executive production
