= Millennium (Monstrosity album) =

Studio album by Monstrosity
- Released: August 27, 1996
- Recorded: Morrisound Recording, Tampa, Florida
- Genre: Death metal
- Length: 40:14
- Label: Conquest (US); Nuclear Blast (worldwide)
- Producer: Scott Burns, Monstrosity

Monstrosity chronology
| Imperial Doom (1992) | Millennium (1996) | In Dark Purity (1999) |

Millennium is the second studio album by Florida death metal band Monstrosity, released in 1996 and produced by Scott Burns. Millennium is the band's final album to include George "Corpsegrinder" Fisher on lead vocals, as he went on to join fellow death metal band Cannibal Corpse.

The album was released on Conquest Music, Inc worldwide and licensed to Nuclear Blast for a European release. It was later licensed by Hammerheart Records (Netherlands) and re-released in the early 2000s for Europe.

The album is considered by many to be a landmark in technical death metal.

== Track listing ==
| No. | Title | Writer(s) | Length |
|---|---|---|---|
| 1. | "Fatal Millennium" | Morgan, Harrison | 4:35 |
| 2. | "Devious Instinct" | Morgan, Harrison | 4:02 |
| 3. | "Manic" | Harrison, Van Erp | 3:30 |
| 4. | "Dream Messiah" | Morgan, Harrison | 4:25 |
| 5. | "Fragments of Resolution" | Morgan, Harrison | 5:08 |
| 6. | "Manipulation Strain" | Morgan, Harrison, Van Erp | 4:02 |
| 7. | "Slaves and Masters" | Fisher, Harrison, Van Erp | 3:13 |
| 8. | "Mirrors of Reason" | Morgan, Harrison | 3:34 |
| 9. | "Stormwinds" | Harrison, Van Erp | 4:59 |
| 10. | "Seize of Change" | Rubin, Harrison | 2:46 |
| Total length: | | | 40:14 |

== Personnel ==
Monstrosity

- George "Corpsegrinder" Fisher – vocals
- Jason "Tux" Morgan – guitars
- Kelly Conlon – bass
- Lee Harrison – drums

Additional musicians

- Jason Avery – backing vocals on track 2, 4, 5 and 7

Production

- Scott Burns – mixing, producer, recording
- Keith Rose – mixing
- Scott Kieklak – mixing
