= Rise to Power (Monstrosity album) =

Studio album by Monstrosity
- Released: September 23, 2003
- Recorded: Audio Hammer Studios in Sanford, Florida
- Genre: Death metal
- Length: 47:57
- Label: Conquest
- Producers: Lee Harrison, Monstrosity

Monstrosity chronology
In Dark Purity (1999)	Rise to Power (2003)	Spiritual Apocalypse (2007)

Rise to Power is the fourth studio album by the American death metal band Monstrosity. The album was recorded at Audio Hammer studios in Sanford, Florida, with the engineer Jason Suecof and was released on September 23, 2003, by Conquest Music.

During the tour to promote Rise to Power, Monstrosity headlined the Rock al Parque festival in Bogotá, Colombia, and performed in front of 80,000 people.

== Background ==
Following an unsuccessful planned Mexican tour, which was initially scheduled for early December 2001 and rescheduled for early 2002 as a result of Sepultura's Mexican dates coinciding with the original tour, Monstrosity began to record their fourth studio album at Morrisound Studios in early 2002. However, due to the band's heavy touring schedule, the recording was delayed to April 2002.

== Critical reception ==
Professional ratings
Review scores
Source	Rating
Allmusic	2/5 stars
Chronicles of Chaos	6/10
Exclaim!	favorable
Scream Magazine	4/6 stars

John Serba of Allmusic criticized the band stating, "Lyrically tired and musically derivative, Monstrosity remains firmly rooted in the early-1990s meat-and-potatoes death metal ethic, eyes not locked on the genre's future like Nile or Absu, or on memorable songwriting." Serba also wrote that in Rise to Power, the group "still doesn't break out of the third tier of Floridian-via-New York City–style baby-eaters, stringing together a bunch of musically competent, third-generation, ripped-off Morbid Angel-via-Slayer-while-sleeping-with-Suffocation riffs, peppered with clackity-typewriter double-bass drums and vocals from Glen Benton's evil second cousin's former roommate, thrice removed." He complemented, "Monstrosity attempts to scorch already blackened, barren ground, with no lighter fluid or original ideas in its possession."

The Chronicles of Chaos webzine writer Brian Meloon gave the album a rating of 6 out of 10, stating that Rise to Power was similar to the band's previous album In Dark Purity, but that he found it rather uninspired. He observed that Monstrosity's style remained largely unchanged: "it's still a riff-heavy brand of death metal featuring both power chord-based riffs and individual note lines, harmonized guitar parts, growled vocals, fast double bass drumming and blast beats." Meloon defined Rise to Power as a "competent release but nothing special."

== Track listing ==
No.	Title	Lyrics	Music	Length
1.	"The Exordium"	Molina	Norman, Harrison	3:16
2.	"Awaiting Armageddon"	Molina, Harrison	Norman, Harrison	3:43
3.	"Wave of Annihilation"	Molina	Norman, Harrison	3:47
4.	"The Fall of Eden"		Norman	2:09
5.	"Chemical Reaction"	Molina	Norman, Harrison	4:14
6.	"A Casket for the Soul"	Avery	Harrison, Hall	4:31
7.	"Rise to Power"	Avery	Harrison	4:14
8.	"Visions of Violence"	Molina, Harrison	Norman, Harrison, Avery, Poggione	3:42
9.	"From Wrath to Ruin"	Molina, Harrison	Harrison	3:45
10.	"Abysmal Gods"	Avery	Harrison	2:29
11.	"Shadow of Obliteration"	Molina	Harrison, Norman	12:03
Total length:				47:57

== Personnel ==
Monstrosity

- Jason Avery – vocals
- Tony Norman – guitars
- Sam Molina – guitars, backing vocals on "Rise to Power"
- Mark English – guitar solo on "Rise to Power"
- Lee Harrison – drums

Production

- Scott Matthews – photography
- Kelly Milliman – photography
- Montrosity – production
- Jason Suecof – engineering, guitar solo on "A Casket for the Soul"
- Tony Norman – assistant engineering
- Lee Harrison – production, graphic design, assistant engineering
- Tom Morris – mastering
- Mike Poggione – bass
- John Snead – drum technician
- Jacek Wisniewski – cover art
