= Gloom (EP) =

EP by Job for a Cowboy
- Released: June 7, 2011
- Recorded: 2011
- Studios: Audiohammer Studios, Sanford, FL, USA
- Genre: Technical death metal
- Length: 15:27
- Label: Metal Blade
- Producer: Jason Suecof

Job for a Cowboy chronology
Live Ruination (2010)	Gloom (2011)	Demonocracy (2012)

Professional ratings
Review scores
Source	Rating
About.com	3/5 stars
Alternative Press	3.5/5 stars
AltSounds	63%
Exclaim!	favourable

Gloom is the third EP by American death metal band Job for a Cowboy. It became available digitally and physically via mail order only on June 7, 2011. The EP was limited to only 2,500 physical copies, which vocalist Jonny Davy explained, "I feel like we're the type of band where so many people simply illegally download our records in the first place. So why not have the die hards have something to get excited about to get their hands on?" This is the first studio recording to feature bassist Nick Schendzielos and guitarist Tony Sannicandro after former members Bobby Thompson and Brent Riggs departed from the band in 2010.

== Track listing ==
All tracks are written by Job for a Cowboy.

No.	Title	Length
1.	"Misery Reformatory"	3:54
2.	"Plastic Idols"	4:44
3.	"Execution Parade"	3:04
4.	"Signature of Starving Power"	3:45
Total length:		15:27

== Personnel ==
- Jon Rice – drums
- Jonny Davy – lead vocals
- Al Glassman – guitar
- Tony Sannicandro – guitar, backing vocals
- Nick Schendzielos – bass guitar

Production

- Jason Suecof – production, engineering, mixing
- Alan Douches – mastering
- Brent E. White – artwork
