= Paths of Possession =

American melodic death metal band

- Origin: United States
- Genre: Melodic death metal
- Years active: 1999–present
- Label: Metal Blade
- Members: Randy Butman; Jay Fossen; Jack Goodwin; Nick Goodyear; George "Corpsegrinder" Fisher

Paths of Possession is an American melodic death metal band featuring George "Corpsegrinder" Fisher of Cannibal Corpse in a more melodic setting, with songs that resemble early Bay Area Thrash rather than the Tampa death metal scene.

== Biography ==
Randy Butman (Silhaven), Jay Fossen, Erin "Goat" Fuller (Cryptic Winds), and Richard Brunelle (ex-Morbid Angel guitarist) formed the band in 1999 as Swollen. Paths of Possession mixes traditional heavy metal with Swedish melodic death metal influences. Paths of Possession self-released their first CD-R demo, Legacy in Ashes, in 2000.

Following the release of Legacy of Ashes, Fuller left the band to join Hell on Earth and was replaced with Brian Ridley (Cancerslug, Union Down) in 2002. Soon after, Keith Suchland, aka "Splattergod", approached Paths of Possession about releasing their next CD. It was decided that they and Dark Faith would release a split EP, with each band contributing four songs.

While working on the split, Withered Earth asked Butman to join in late 2002, which he did in January 2003, resulting in the band going on hiatus and the split being put on hold. Following the release of Withered Earths' Of Which They Bleed, the band broke up and Butman returned to Tampa and reformed Paths of Possession.

As their then-vocalist Bill Lander had relocated to New York, Butman asked George "Corpsegrinder" Fisher (vocalist of Cannibal Corpse) to sing. The new line-up recorded six songs in Ozone Studios, St. Petersburg, Florida, finishing in September 2003. The result, The Crypt of Madness, was released on Splattergod Records, limited to 1000 copies. Plans were made to release their full-length CD in late 2004 or early 2005.

After the split's release, in early 2004, Richard Brunelle was replaced with current guitarist Jack Goodwin, and drummer Brian Ridley left to rejoin Cancerslug. Nick Goodyear (Dark Faith) took over drums. Paths of Possession debuted their new lineup at the second Gathering of Lowlifes Festival on April 9, 2005, appearing with Hallow's Eve, Dark Faith, Gardy Loo, and Eviscerated Zombie Tampon.

During this time, Metal Blade Records owner Brian Slagel approached Fisher about signing Paths of Possession, which came about in 2005. Paths of Possession entered Mana Recording Studios / Razzor Media in St. Petersburg, Florida to record Promises in Blood with producer Erik Rutan (Hate Eternal, Soilent Green, Into the Moat). Once the recording was finished, Promises in Blood was sent off to West West Side in New York City to be mastered by Alan Douches, known for his work with Nile, Sepultura, Hatebreed, Clutch, Unearth, The Misfits, Mastodon, Shadows Fall, The Dillinger Escape Plan, Converge and Earth Crisis.

== Current members ==
- Randy Butman – bass
- Jay Fossen – guitars
- Jack Goodwin – guitars
- Nick Goodyear – drums
- George "Corpsegrinder" Fisher – vocals (2003–present)

=== Former members ===
- Erin Fuller – drums
- Brian Ridley – drums
- Chad – drums
- Bill – vocals
- Richard Brunelle – guitars (died 2019)

== Discography ==
- Legacy in Ashes (2002)
- The Crypt of Madness (Paths of Possession / Dark Faith split album) (2003)
- Promises in Blood (2005)
- The End of the Hour (2007)
