= Demonocracy =

Studio album by Job for a Cowboy
- Released: April 10, 2012
- Studios: Audiohammer Studios, Sanford, FL, USA
- Genre: Technical death metal
- Length: 40:29
- Label: Metal Blade
- Producer: Jason Suecof

Job for a Cowboy chronology
Gloom (2011)	Demonocracy (2012)	Sun Eater (2014)

Professional ratings
Review scores
Source	Rating
About.com	3.5/5 stars
AllMusic	3/5 stars
Alternative Press	4/5 stars
Exclaim!	undetermined
Spin	6/10

Demonocracy is the third studio album by American death metal band Job for a Cowboy. It was released on April 10, 2012. It is the band's first studio album to feature guitarist Tony Sannicandro and bassist Nick Schendzielos and the last album to feature drummer Jon Rice.

Demonocracy had first week sales of 4,900 to chart at No. 87 on the Billboard 200.

== Promotion ==
On February 21, 2012, Job for a Cowboy released the first song from the album, "Nourishment Through Bloodshed." It was released via Metal Blade Records' YouTube channel.

On March 20, Job for a Cowboy premiered the song "Black Discharge" and, on April 2, the song "Imperium Wolves."

A music video was made for the song Tarnished Gluttony. The video features a man carrying a small child to a forest, before cutting the child open with a box cutter, replacing the organs with a cephalopod, and then gently placing the child into the sea.

== Track listing ==
No.	Title	Length
1.	"Children of Deceit"	4:36
2.	"Nourishment Through Bloodshed"	3:42
3.	"Imperium Wolves"	4:48
4.	"Tongueless and Bound"	4:03
5.	"Black Discharge"	3:55
6.	"The Manipulation Stream"	4:40
7.	"The Deity Misconception"	4:05
8.	"Fearmonger"	4:18
9.	"Tarnished Gluttony"	6:15
Total length:		40:29

Limited edition bonus disc: Gloom EP
No.	Title	Length
1.	"Misery Reformatory"	3:54
2.	"Plastic Idols"	4:44
3.	"Execution Parade"	3:04
4.	"Signature of Starving Power"	3:45
Total length:		15:27

== Influences ==
In a 2012 interview with Loudwire, vocalist Jonny Davy listed both Cattle Decapitation and Misery Index as influences upon the sound of the album.

== Credits ==
Production and performance credits are adapted from the album liner notes, except where noted.

=== Personnel ===
Job for a Cowboy

- Jonny Davy – vocals
- Al Glassman – guitars
- Tony Sannicandro – guitars
- Nick Schendzielos – bass
- Jon Rice – drums

Production

- Jason Suecof – production, engineering, mixing
- Eyal Levi – engineering
- Ronn Miller – assistant engineering
- Alan Douches – mastering

Artwork and design

- Brent Elliott White – artwork
- Brian Ames – layout

Management

- Chuck Andrews – management
- Brian Slagel – A&R

=== Studios ===
- Audiohammer Studios – recording
- West Westside – mastering
- You Get What You Get Studios – pre-production

== Charts ==
Chart (2012)	Peak position
US Billboard 200	87
US Independent Albums (Billboard)	15
US Top Hard Rock Albums (Billboard)	8
US Top Rock Albums (Billboard)	30
