= Job for a Cowboy =

American death metal band

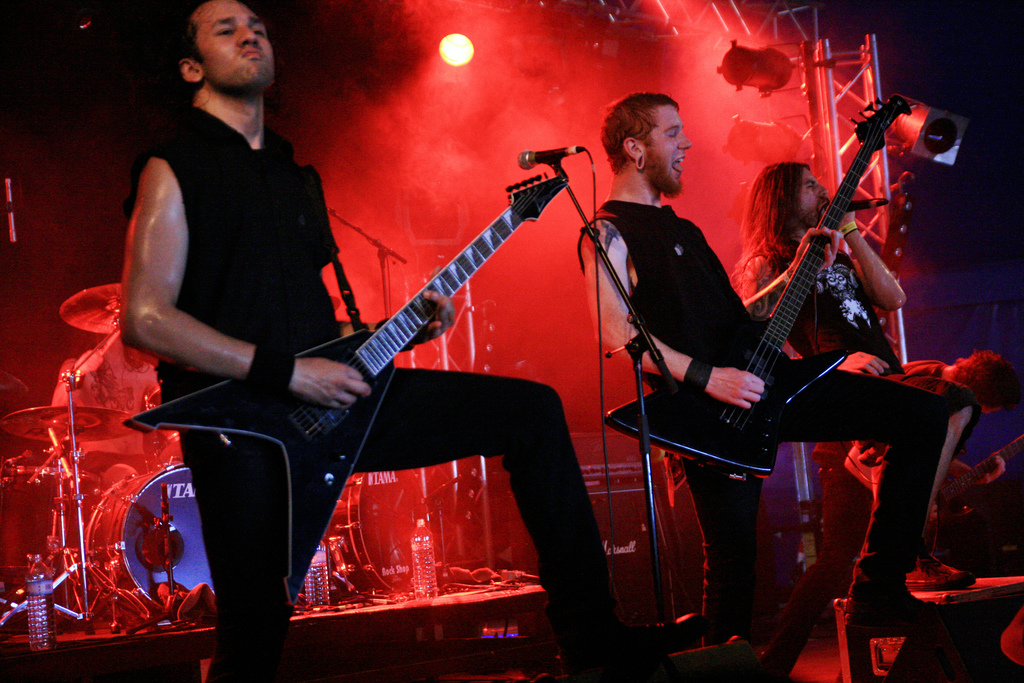
- Job for a Cowboy at Hellfest 2008

Background information
- Also known as: JFAC
- Origin: Glendale, Arizona, U.S.
- Genres: Death metal; technical death metal; progressive death metal; deathcore (early)
- Years active: 2003–present
- Labels: Metal Blade; King of the Monsters
- Spinoffs: Fleshwrought; Knights of the Abyss; Serpent of Gnosis
- Members: Jonny Davy; Al Glassman; Nick Schendzielos; Tony Sannicandro
- Past members: Ravi Bhadriraju; Andy Rysdam; Brent Riggs; Elliott Sellers; Bobby Thompson; Jon Rice; Andrew Arcurio; Chad Staples

Job for a Cowboy is an American death metal band from Glendale, Arizona. Formed in 2003, the band's debut album, Genesis, was released in 2007, peaked at No. 54 on the US Billboard 200 and sold 13,000 copies in its first week of release. The second album, 2009's Ruination, sold 10,600 copies in the United States in its first week to debut at No. 42 on the Billboard 200 chart. The band comprises vocalist Jonny Davy, guitarists Tony Sannicandro and Al Glassman and bassist Nick Schendzielos. Davy is the only remaining founding member. The band has played in international music festivals, including Sounds of the Underground, Download Festival, Mayhem Festival, Summer Slaughter, Graspop Metal Meeting, and Wacken Open Air.

Loudwire designated Job for a Cowboy as being among deathcore's "Big Four", along with Whitechapel, Thy Art is Murder and Suicide Silence.

== History ==
=== Formation and Doom EP (2003–2006) ===
Job for a Cowboy was founded in Glendale, Arizona, during December 2003 by vocalist Jonny Davy, guitarists Ravi Bhadriraju and Andrew Arcurio, bassist Chad Staples, and drummer Andy Rysdam when they were 15-16 years of age. In 2004, they created a MySpace profile, posted songs online, and began to connect with worldwide fans. In an interview, Davy regretted the band name, which stuck because "every generic metal band name [...] was taken". Later that year, Staples and Rysdam left Job for a Cowboy and were replaced with Brent Riggs and Elliott Sellers, respectively, as bassist and drummer. Traffic to the band's MySpace profile increased exponentially in late 2005 when the band released their first EP, Doom. The EP attracted the attention of Arizona independent label King of the Monsters, who distributed the disc after an initial self-released pressing. The EP release helped the band win the award for Best Metal Band at the Third Annual Arizona Ska Punk Awards Ceremony in Phoenix, Arizona.

Job for a Cowboy extensively promoted their EP, including three performances on the Sounds of the Underground tour. By the end of the year, the band obtained professional management and signed a deal with Metal Blade Records, who reissued Doom with a bonus track. During the same year, 2006, Arcurio left the band and Bobby Thompson joined. While Job for a Cowboy was writing their first full-length album, Sellers announced that he was leaving the band to go back to school immediately after recording the album. In search of a permanent drummer, the band posted a bulletin on Blabbermouth.net, which Jon "The Charn" Rice saw. He made a video of himself, posted it on YouTube, and sent the link to the band. Soon after, Rice joined the band.

=== Genesis (2007–2008) ===
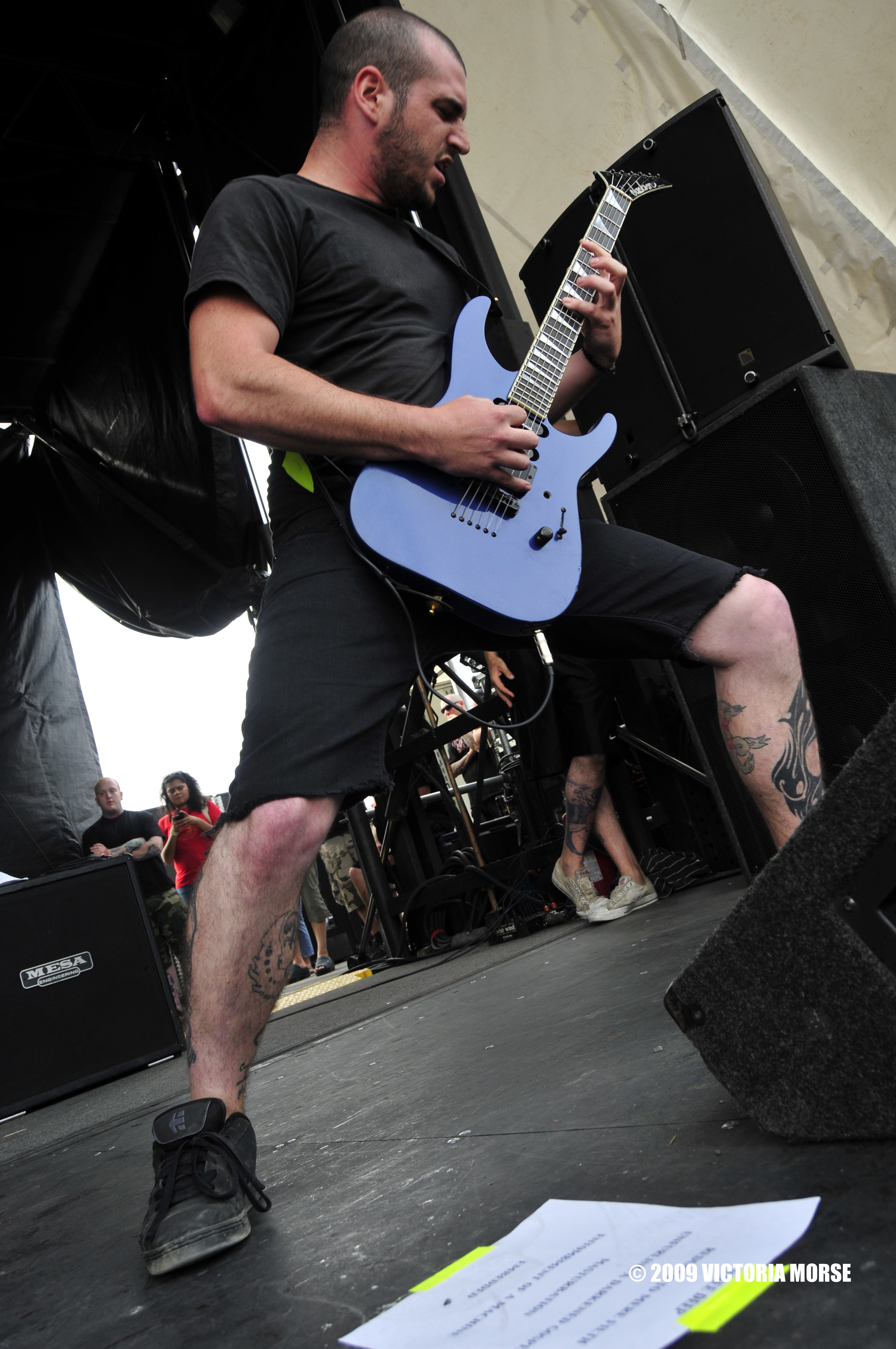
Guitarist Al Glassman, who was originally the guitarist for Despised Icon, joined Job for a Cowboy in late 2008.

In March 2007, Job for a Cowboy completed their debut full-length album, Genesis. It was recorded at Blue Light Audio Media in Phoenix, Arizona, with producer Cory Spotts. It was mixed by Sabbat guitarist Andy Sneap. Released on May 15, the album peaked at No. 54 on the Billboard 200 and sold nearly 13,000 copies in its first week, which made Genesis the highest-charting heavy metal debut since Slipknot's 1999 debut album. The album received generally positive reviews. Kerrang! magazine said, "an album that quite literally obliterates everyone else currently residing within the death and grind scenes" and "one of the year's most essential metal purchases."

In June 2007, the band performed at the Download Festival in Donington Park, England. The group played at the Sounds of the Underground festival with Amon Amarth, Chimaira, Gwar, and Shadows Fall. In October, Job for a Cowboy co-headlined the 2007 Radio Rebellion Tour with Behemoth, Gojira, and Beneath the Massacre. The band featured on the 2008 Gigantour with headliners Megadeth, Children of Bodom, In Flames, and High on Fire. They were confirmed for a number of festivals during 2008, including Wacken Open Air in Germany and a second appearance at England's Download Festival. Job for a Cowboy headlined a U.S. tour in November and December 2008 with supporting acts Hate Eternal and All Shall Perish. In 2008, Job for a Cowboy won Best Metal Band at The Arizona Ska Punk Awards again, and again the next year at the 2009 Awards Ceremony.

In late 2008, guitarist Ravi Bhadriraju left Job for a Cowboy to pursue a career in medicine. Former Despised Icon guitarist Al Glassman replaced him.

=== Ruination and Gloom (2009–2011) ===
On May 1, 2009, the band announced that they had completed their second studio album, Ruination, at AudioHammer studios in Sanford, Florida, with producer Jason Suecof. The album marked Glassman's drummer Jon "the Charn" Rice's debuts, the latter of whom had been with the band since the tour for Genesis. Ruination was released on July 7, 2009, worldwide through Metal Blade Records. The album sold around 10,600 copies in the United States in its first week of release to debut at No. 42 on the Billboard 200 chart. Job for a Cowboy participated in the second Mayhem Festival, playing on the Hot Topic stage with bands such as Cannibal Corpse and Whitechapel.

At the beginning of 2011, the band recorded an EP in February at the Audiohammer Studios in Sanford, Florida, with producer Jason Suecof. Before recording began, bassist Brent Riggs and guitarist Bobby Thompson departed the band and were replaced with Nick Schendzielos of Cephalic Carnage and Tony Sannicandro, respectively. On April 13, 2011, a video appeared on the internet of drummer Rice performing a new song in the studio. Job for a Cowboy issued the EP Gloom on June 7, 2011. It was only available for purchase through mail order and digital download.

Job for a Cowboy entered Audio Hammer Studios in September 2011 to record their next effort. The group worked with the production team of Jason Suecof, Eyal Levi of Dååth, and Ronn Miller.

=== Demonocracy and Sun Eater (2012–2016) ===
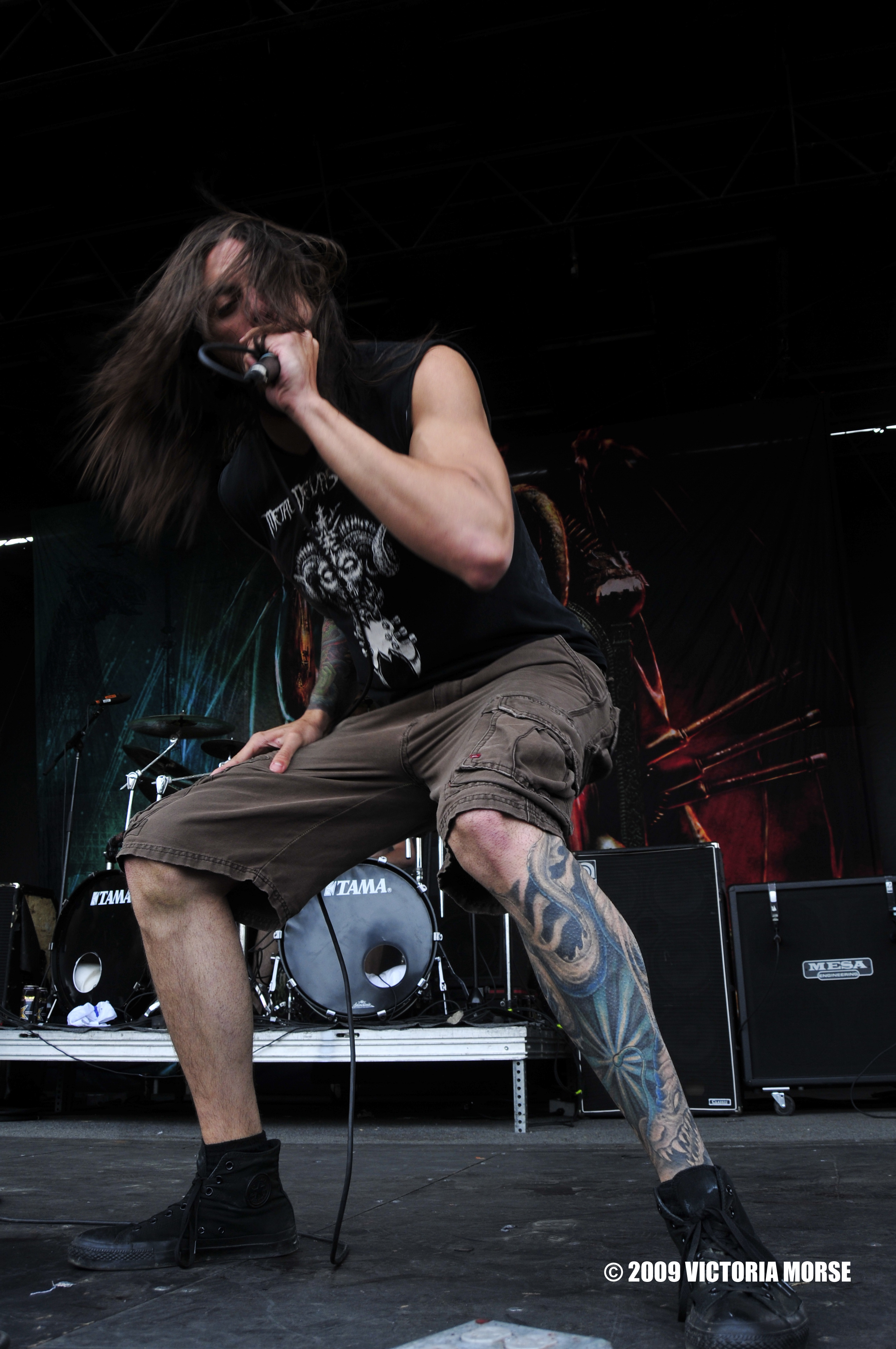
Vocalist Jonny Davy (pictured) is the only remaining original member of the band.

On February 21, 2012, Job for a Cowboy released the first single from the album Demonocracy, "Nourishment Through Bloodshed". It was released via Metal Blade Records' YouTube channel.

On March 20, Job for a Cowboy premiered the song "Black Discharge", and, on April 2, "Imperium Wolves". Demonocracy was released on April 10, 2012, and had first-week sales reaching 4,900, which charted at 87 on the Billboard 200. That summer, they were a part of the Summer Slaughter tour with acts such as Cannibal Corpse, Between the Buried and Me, and The Faceless.

On October 21, 2013, the band announced they were recording their fourth full-length album. Drummer Rice, announced, eight days after the album announcement, that he was departing the band. It was announced on February 5, 2014, that he had joined hard rock band Scorpion Child.

On September 23, 2014, the band announced upcoming album Sun Eater, released on November 11 via Metal Blade. The band released their first single from the album, "Sun of Nihility". The second single off of Sun Eater was "Eating the Visions of God".

On January 22, 2016, it was announced that Rice had rejoined the band for a one-off show.

=== Recent activities and Moon Healer (2016–present) ===
During a 2016 Interview at the NAMM Show, bassist Nick Schendzielos revealed that the band had written four new songs. He said that they hoped to release new music in late 2017 that would follow the musical direction of Sun Eater.

In 2019, frontman Jonny Davy and guitarists Alan Glassman and Tony Sannicandro formed the group Serpent of Gnosis with The Black Dahlia Murder bassist Max Lavelle and Deeds of Flesh drummer Darren Cesca.

In August 2019, it was published that Job for a Cowboy might be "plotting a legit comeback with new music (an EP) and possibly some shows", according to "sources close to the band." In May 2020, Job for a Cowboy alluded to a reunion on Twitter with a clip from the 1995 film Mortal Kombat, after which producer Jason Suecof, who has mixed and engineered three of the group's full-length albums, said, "[vocalist] Jonny Davy just sang me the whole new album". In June 2020, Suecof confirmed that the band would record new music, although production was slowed by the COVID-19 pandemic. In September 2020, the band revealed that Navene Koperweis would be the session drummer on the band's upcoming album.

On January 27, 2023, it was announced the band would perform for the first time in seven years at the Blue Ridge Rock Festival in September.

On August 28, 2023, the band released their first song in nine years, "The Agony Seeping Storm", which would be featured on the band's upcoming fifth album. On October 24, the band released a second single, "The Forever Rot", and announced their fifth album, Moon Healer, would be released on February 23, 2024. On January 31, 2024, the band released the third single from Moon Healer, "Beyond the Chemical Doorway".

== Musical style and influences ==
Job for a Cowboy originally started as a deathcore group, but they changed their style to death metal with the release of their first full-length album Genesis. The band has also been described as technical death metal. Job for a Cowboy has been described by The New York Times as "an Arizona band with a guttural, brute-force sound descended (indirectly) from hardcore punk" and "straightforwardly brutal act" by Rolling Stone magazine. Additionally, Kerrang! referred to them as a "Myspace band" due to their use of the platform to promote their music early in their career, despite their stylistic dissimilarities with other bands associated with this term. Loudwire similarly stated that the band has also been classified under several other "all-encompassing" labels such as "myspace-core" and "scene-core," due to the band's popularity with listeners who the publication described as "the scene kids of Myspace."

On the band's fourth full-length album Sun Eater, Job for a Cowboy started experimenting with a more progressive writing structure and style. The album, which was called "progressive death metal", was praised for its stylistic innovation in contrast to the band's previous albums. The band's fifth studio album, Moon Healer, continues the progressive death metal sound introduced on Sun Eater, while throwing back to their earlier deathcore sound.

Job for a Cowboy's influences include Nile, Mastodon, Decapitated, Hate Eternal, Cattle Decapitation, Psycroptic, and Misery Index.

Vocalist Jonny Davy has commented on the perceived negative connotations associated with the "deathcore" label, believing the oversaturation of bands within the scene beginning in the 2010s (and overall lack of differentiation between artists) is partially to blame.

== Band members ==
Current

- Jonny Davy – lead vocals (2003–present)
- Al Glassman – rhythm guitar (2008–present)
- Tony Sannicandro – lead guitar, backing vocals (2011–present)
- Nick Schendzielos – bass (2011–present)

Session / Touring

- Navene Koperweis – drums (2020–present)
- Mike Caputo – drums (2023–present)

Former

- Chad Staples – bass (2003–2004)
- Andy Rysdam – drums (2003–2004) (Knights of the Abyss)
- Andrew Arcurio – lead guitar (2003–2006)
- Ravi Bhadriraju – rhythm guitar (2003–2008)
- Brent Riggs – bass, backing vocals (2004–2011)
- Elliott Sellers – drums (2004–2006)
- Bobby Thompson – lead guitar (2006–2011)
- Jon "The Charn" Rice – drums (2007–2013, one-off in 2016)
- Danny Walker – drums (2013–2014; session)

== Discography ==
Job for a Cowboy discography
- Studio albums: 5
- Extended plays: 3
- Singles: 3
- Music videos: 9
- Demos: 1

=== Studio albums ===
List of studio albums, with selected chart positions
Year	Album details	Peak chart positions			
Year	Album details	US	US Indie.	US Rock	US Hard Rock
2007	Genesis: Released: May 15, 2007; Label: Metal Blade; Formats: CD, digital download	54	4	15	—
2009	Ruination: Released: July 7, 2009; Label: Metal Blade; Formats: CD, digital download	42	4	14	7
2012	Demonocracy: Released: April 10, 2012; Label: Metal Blade; Formats: CD, digital download	87	15	30	8
2014	Sun Eater: Released: November 11, 2014; Label: Metal Blade; Formats: CD, digital download	91	12	20	6
2024	Moon Healer: Released: February 23, 2024; Label: Metal Blade; Formats: CD, digital download, Vinyl LP	29	9	7	3
"—" denotes a recording that did not chart or was not released in that territory.

=== EPs ===
List of EPs
Year	Album details
2005	Doom: Released: December 6, 2005; Label: King of the Monsters; Formats: CD, digital download
2010	Live Ruination: Released: November 23, 2010; Label: Metal Blade; Formats: CD, digital download
2011	Gloom: Released: June 7, 2011; Label: Metal Blade; Formats: CD, digital download

=== Singles ===
Year	Song	Album
2009	"Unfurling a Darkened Gospel"	Ruination
2011	"Misery Reformatory"	Gloom
2012	"Nourishment Through Bloodshed"	Demonocracy
2014	"Sun of Nihility"	Sun Eater
2014	"Eating the Visions of God"	Sun Eater
2023	"The Agony Seeping Storm"	Moon Healer
2023	"The Forever Rot"	Moon Healer
2024	"Beyond the Chemical Doorway"	Moon Healer

=== Music videos ===
Year	Title	From the album	Director
2006	"Entombment of a Machine"	Doom	Richie Valdez
2007	"Embedded"	Genesis	Popcore
2008	"Altered from Catechization"	Genesis	Doug Spangenberg
2009	"Unfurling a Darkened Gospel"	Ruination	Doug Spangenberg
2010	"Ruination"	Ruination	Kevin McVey
2012	"Tarnished Gluttony"	Demonocracy	Michael Panduro
2023	"The Agony Seeping Storm"	Moon Healer	K. Hunter Lamar & Nick Schendzielos
2023	"The Forever Rot"	Moon Healer	Nick Schendzielos, K. Hunter Lamar & Johnny Davy
2024	"Beyond the Chemical Doorway"	Moon Healer	Chris Klumpp

== Concert tours ==
- Sounds of the Underground 2006 (2006)
- Job for a Cowboy Jan/Feb 2007 tour (January 12 – February 18, 2007)
- Unearth European headlining tour (March 21 – April 16, 2007)
- Download Festival 2007 (June 8–10, 2007)
- Radio Rebellion Tour (October 18 – November 18, 2007)
- Gigantour 3: North America (April 12 – May 22, 2008)
- Wacken Open Air 2008 (July 2008)
- Headlining Tour (November 13 – December 16, 2008)
- Mayhem Festival 2009(July 10 – August 16, 2009)
- Lamb of God Us Tour (September 16 – November 11, 2009)
- Lamb of God Europe Tour (February 9 – March 12, 2010)
- Job For A Cowboy Headlining Tour (April 21 – May 27, 2010)
- Download Festival 2010 (June 11, 2010)
- Gods of Metal 2010 (June 25, 2010)
- Graspop Metal Meeting 2010 (June 27, 2010)
- With Full Force 2010 (July 2, 2010)
- Wacken Open Air 2010 (August 6–7, 2010)
- 2010 South American Tour (July 17–25, 2010)
- Ruination UK/Euro Tour 2010 (November 4–28, 2010)
- Job for a Cowboy Fall US Headline Tour (December 5–20, 2010)
- Between the Buried and Me US Tour (April 15 – May 15, 2011)
- Destroyers Of The Faith UK (March 3–11, 2012)
- Metal Alliance Tour 2012 (March 15 – April 21, 2012)
- The Summer Slaughter Tour 2012 (July 20 – August 25, 2012)
- The Womb to Waste Tour (September 14 – October 14, 2012)
- The End of the World (December 6–18, 2012)
- Bonecrusher Fest 2013 (March 1–30, 2013)
- The Divinity of Purpose 2013 Tour (April 9–21, 2013)
- Mayhem Festival 2013 (June 29 – August 4, 2013)
