= Ruination (album) =

Studio album by Job for a Cowboy
- Released: July 7, 2009
- Recorded: 2009
- Studio: AudioHammer Studios in Sanford, Florida
- Genre: Death metal
- Length: 40:31
- Label: Metal Blade
- Producer: Jason Suecof

Job for a Cowboy chronology
Genesis (2007)	Ruination (2009)	Live Ruination (2010)

Singles from Ruination
- 1. "Unfurling a Darkened Gospel" Released: June 16, 2009; 2. "Ruination" Released: April 26, 2010

Professional ratings
Review scores
Source	Rating
About.com	4/5 stars
AllMusic	4/5 stars
Alternative Press	4/5 stars
Blabbermouth	7.5/10 stars

Ruination is the second studio album by American death metal band Job for a Cowboy. The follow-up to their first studio album Genesis, Ruination was recorded and mixed at AudioHammer studios in Sanford, Florida with producer Jason Suecof. It was released July 7, 2009, through Metal Blade Records. The album sold around 10,600 copies in the United States in its first week of release to debut at position No. 42 on The Billboard 200 chart. It was the group's first album to feature drummer Jon Rice and guitarist Al Glassman. This is also the last album to feature guitarist Bobby Thompson, guitarist Ravi Bhadriraju and bassist Brent Riggs.

== Background ==
Following the departure of guitarist Ravi Bhadriraju, who left Job for a Cowboy to go back to medical school—being replaced by former Despised Icon guitarist Al Glassman, the band recorded demo tracks with producer Jason Suecof. Vocalist Jonny Davy stated in an interview with Way Too Loud!, that this material differs from the band's first full-length, to have "a bit of an old-school [death metal] touch." Davy also explained when interviewed by MetalSucks, before the release of the album, that Job for a Cowboy are "in with new influences with the next record", but not going to be a drastic shift in comparison with Genesis. He also said, "We’re just learning from our mistakes and nit picking everything and evolving as a band."

== Lyrical themes ==
According to frontman Jonny Davy, the ideas involved with Ruination branch off from 2007's Genesis, but are more politically based. The topics addressed by the album's schema revolve around modern-day worldwide dilemmas and controversial issues including "propaganda in the mainstream media and television, human rights in North Korea, the modern genocidal government of Nubia [sic], the use of torture in American military tactics, consequences of nuclear war, and overruling by world governments and police states/martial law." Ruination is politically based, but not a concept album as its predecessor Genesis.

== Track listing ==
All tracks are written by Job for a Cowboy.

No.	Title	Length
1.	"Unfurling a Darkened Gospel"	3:43
2.	"Summon the Hounds"	3:51
3.	"Constitutional Masturbation"	3:35
4.	"Regurgitated Disinformation"	4:46
5.	"March to Global Enslavement"	6:05
6.	"Butchering the Enlightened"	3:30
7.	"Lords of Chaos"	3:36
8.	"Psychological Immorality"	3:08
9.	"To Detonate and Exterminate"	3:22
10.	"Ruination"	4:55
Total length:		40:31

iTunes edition bonus track
No.	Title	Length
11.	"The Matter of Splatter" (Exhumed cover)	3:43
Total length:		44:16

== Personnel ==
Job for a Cowboy

- Jon Rice – drums
- Brent Riggs – bass guitar, backing vocals
- Bobby Thompson – guitar
- Jonny Davy – lead vocals
- Al Glassman – guitar
- Ravi Bhadriraju - guitar solo on "Unfurling a Darkened Gospel"

Production

- Jason Suecof – production, engineering, mixing
- Mark Lewis, Ronnie Miller – assistant engineers
- Alan Douches – mastering
- Brent Elliott White – artwork
- Brian J. Ames – layout design
- Brian Slagel – A&R
