= List of Pestilence band members =

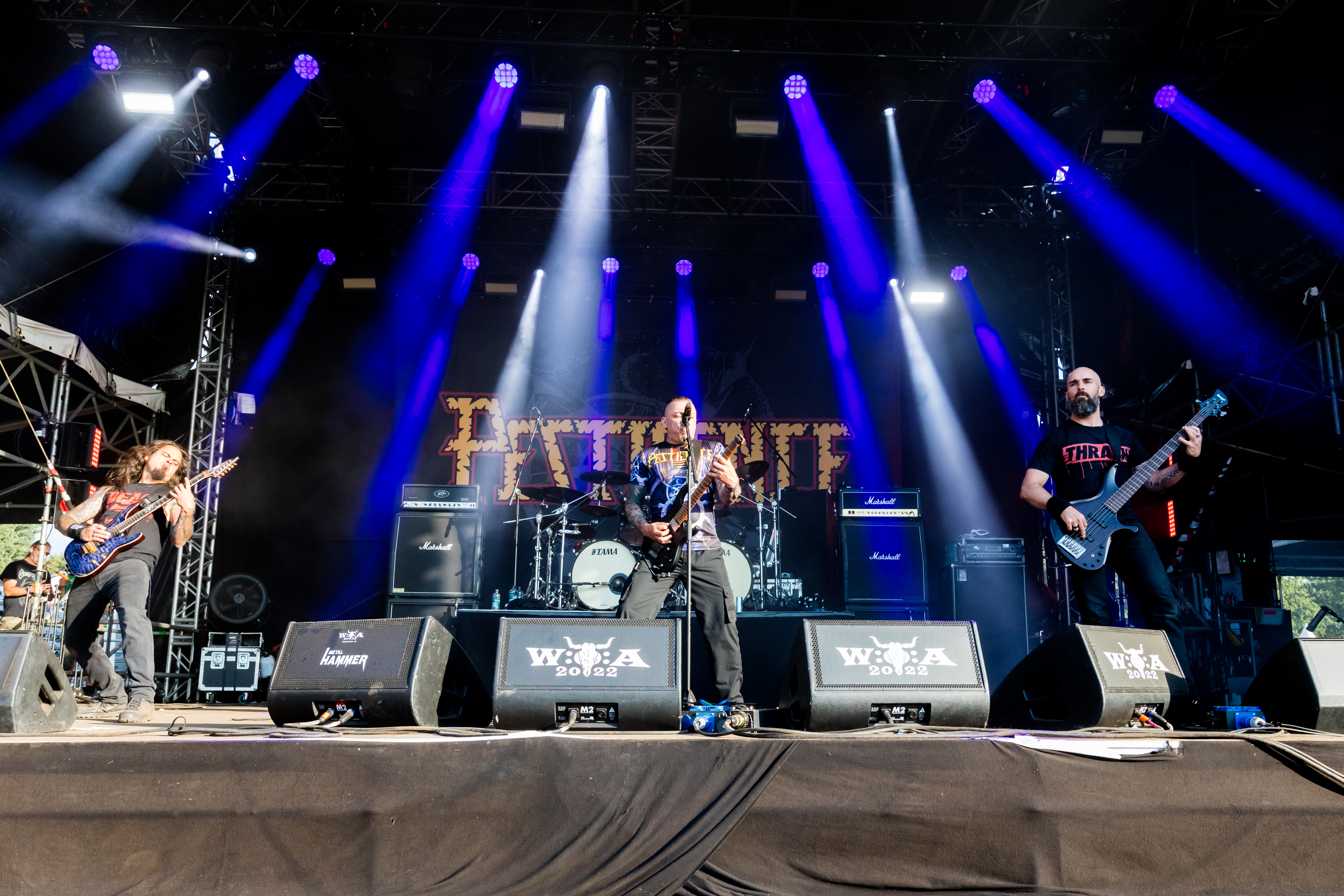
Pestilence performing live in 2022.

Pestilence are a Dutch technical death metal band from Enschede. Formed in early 1986, the group originally consisted of vocalist and bassist Chuck Colli, guitarist Randy Meinhard, and drummer Patrick Mameli. After Colli's early departure, Mameli switched to guitar and has remained in this role ever since; he took over vocals permanently in 1990. Pestilence disbanded in 1994, then reformed between 2008 and 2014, and have been active again since 2016. The band's current lineup includes Mameli alongside drummer Michiel van der Plicht (since 2020) and guitarist Max Blok (since 2025).

== History ==
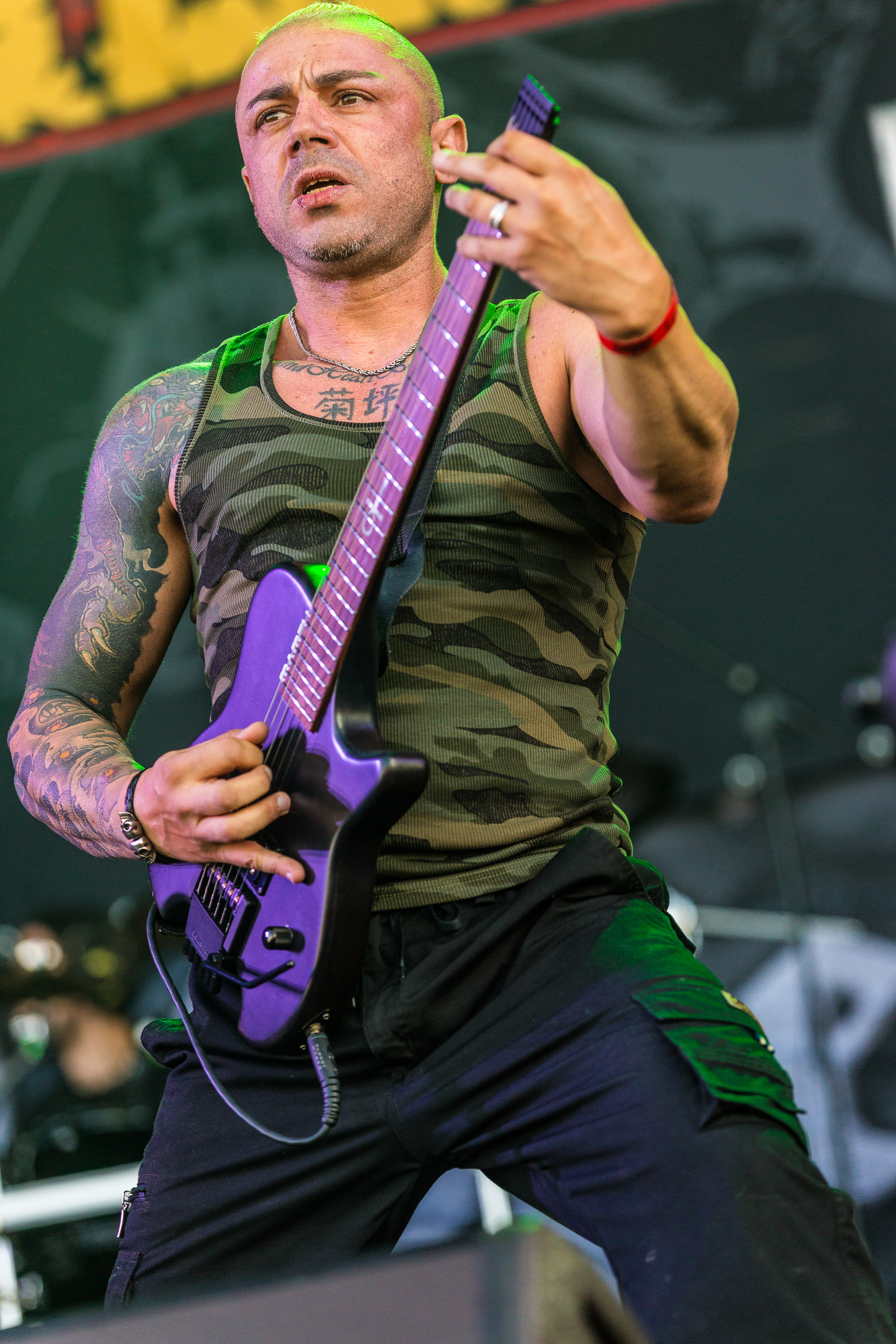
Patrick Mameli is the only constant member of Pestilence.

=== 1986–1994 ===
Pestilence was formed in early 1986 by guitarists Randy Meinhard and Patrick Mameli, who met through an advertisement placed by Meinhard. The original lineup also included vocalist and bassist Chuck Colli, with Mameli temporarily on drums. Colli was "kicked out" after around a month. Mameli subsequently switched to guitar and took over vocal duties, with Gerrit Ulrich and Marco Foddis brought in on bass and drums, respectively. Ulrich left after a few months and the band recorded its first demo Dysentery as a three-piece, with Mameli also covering bass duties. In September 1987, Martin van Drunen took over as the band's vocalist, also performing live bass.

After the release of second demo The Penance and full-length debut Malleus Maleficarum, Pestilence went through a number of lineup changes. According to Foddis, the group essentially broke up in late 1988, with him and Meinhard forming a new band called Sacrosanct. The pair saw out a December 1988 tour, before guitarist Patrick Uterwijk and bassist Sebastian Dooijes from support act Theriac joined the band. At the time, Mameli claimed that he had dismissed Meinhard and Foddis. By January 1989, Foddis had returned, and by March, van Drunen had returned to live bass duties due to Dooijes' departure. This lineup released Consuming Impulse in December 1989.

Martin van Drunen left Pestilence and joined Asphyx shortly after the completion of a US tour in October 1990, claiming that Mameli had "been behaving too much like a band boss". Mameli subsequently took over vocal duties and van Drunen was briefly replaced on bass by Nick Sagias, although he left "after a couple of months or so", with Mameli later claiming that "personality-wise it just didn't click between him and the rest of the band". Tony Choy of Cynic and Atheist took over in time for the recording of 1991's Testimony of the Ancients. In the summer of 1992, with Choy unavailable, Jack Dodd stood in on bass for the band's performance at Dynamo Open Air festival.

Pestilence recruited Jeroen Paul Thesseling as their new full-time bassist later in 1992 and released their fourth album Spheres in 1993. The band broke up in 1994, with various sources claiming that the band were experiencing internal tensions and/or that Spheres did not sell as highly as expected.

=== 2008–2019 ===
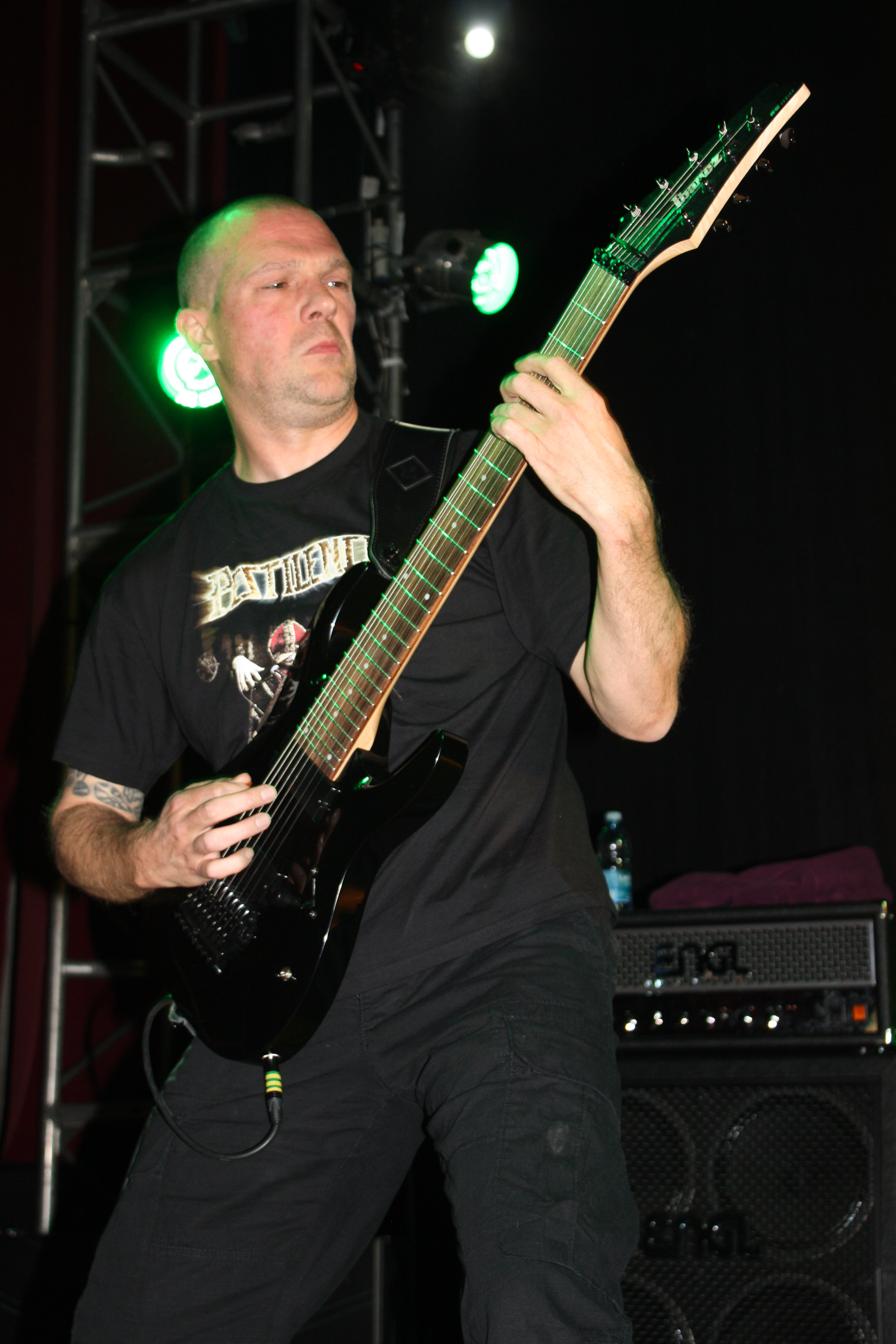
Patrick Uterwijk rejoined Pestilence in 2008 and remained until they broke up again in 2014.

Patrick Mameli announced the reformation of Pestilence in January 2008, with Tony Choy returning on bass and Peter Wildoer of Darkane added on drums. That March, former guitarist Patrick Uterwijk was added to the band's touring lineup. The main trio released the band's first album in 16 years, Resurrection Macabre, in March 2009. After touring until September, Choy was replaced by his previous successor, Jeroen Paul Thesseling. Wildoer also left after the tour, described by Mameli as "a session drummer" for his tenure. He was replaced in December by Yuma van Eekelen. The new lineup — now also including Uterwijk as a full-time member — released Doctrine in April 2011.

In February 2012, Mameli announced that Thesseling and van Eekelen had left to "work more intensively on their main projects", with Stephan Fimmers of Necrophagist and Tim Yeung of Morbid Angel taking their places. By July, Yeung had been replaced due to "conflicting tour schedules" by Psycroptic drummer Dave Haley, and by February 2013, Fimmers had also been replaced by Georg Maier in time for the recording of Obsideo. After the album's touring cycle, Mameli announced in July 2014 that Pestilence was "on permanent hold", but noted that "If there is any interest in Pestilence doing old-school shows in the future, me and Patrick Uterwijk will surely think about the options."

Just over two years later, in October 2016, Mameli announced a second reformation of Pestilence, with a lineup including returning bassist Tony Choy alongside new members Santiago Dobles (guitar) and Septimiu Hărşan (drums). By the following February, Choy had been replaced by Alan Goldstein, with Mameli commenting: "Choy's out. I only work with professional people." Within a couple of months, Goldstein had also been dismissed, with Vicious Rumors bassist Tilen Hudrap taking his place. The new lineup recorded the band's comeback album Hadeon, before Dobles left in November 2017 due to "personal circumstances", with his place taken by Calin Paraschiv, a bandmate of Hărşan's in Necrovile. By the end of 2018, Pestilence included all three members of Necrovile, as Edward Negrea replaced Hudrap, who had to leave due to "scheduling differences".

=== Since 2019 ===
On 1 June 2019, Pestilence announced that Rutger van Noordenburg had replaced Calin Paraschiv on guitar. Six months later, Edward Negrea was also replaced, by Joost van der Graaf. Finally, another six months later, Septimiu Hărşan left due to "personal and professional matters partly related to the COVID-19 pandemic", with Michiel van der Plicht taking his place. After recording Exitivm and Levels of Perception, van der Graaf left in July 2023 and was replaced by Roel Käller. In January 2025, van Noordenburg also left the band, with Max Blok taking his place. In November of that year it was announced that bassist Roel Käller had left Pestilence two months earlier and was replaced by Dario Rudić. On August 7, 2026, Pestilence announced that bassist Dario Rudić had left the band due to "personal reasons" - and that the group is looking for a new bass player.

== Members ==
=== Current ===
Image	Name	Years active	Instruments	Release contributions
	Patrick Mameli	1986–1994; 2008–2014; 2016–present	guitars; vocals (except 1987–1990); studio bass (1987–1988, 1989–1990); drums (early 1986)	all Pestilence releases
	Michiel van der Plicht	2020–present	drums	Exitivm (2021); Levels of Perception (2024)
	Max Blok	2025–present	guitars	none to date

=== Former ===
Image	Name	Years active	Instruments	Release contributions
	Randy Meinhard	1986–1988	guitars	Dysentery (1987); The Penance (1987); "Hatred Within" (1988); Malleus Maleficarum (1988); Chronicles of the Scourge (2006)
	Chuck Colli	1986	vocals; bass	none
	Marco Foddis	1986–1988; 1989–1994	drums	all Pestilence releases from Dysentery (1987) to Chronicles of the Scourge (2006); Presence of the Past (2015); Reflections of the Mind (2016); Presence of the Pest (2016)
	Gerrit Ulrich	1986	bass	none
	Martin van Drunen	1987–1990	vocals; live bass	The Penance (1987); "Hatred Within" (1988); Malleus Maleficarum (1988); Consuming Impulse (1989); Chronicles of the Scourge (2006)
	Patrick Uterwijk	1988–1994; 2008–2014	guitars	all Pestilence releases from Consuming Impulse (1989) to Presence of the Pest (2016), except Resurrection Macabre (2009)
	Sebastian Dooijes	1988–1989	bass	none
	Nick Sagias	1990–1991	bass	none
	Tony Choy	1991–1992; 2008–2009; 2016–2017	bass	Testimony of the Ancients (1991); Resurrection Macabre (2009); Presence of the Pest (2016)
	Jack Dodd	1992	bass	Presence of the Past (2015)
	Jeroen Paul Thesseling	1992–1994; 2009–2012	bass	Spheres (1993); Doctrine (2011); Reflections of the Mind (2016)
	Peter Wildoer	2008–2009	drums	Ressurection Macabre (2009)
	Yuma van Eekelen	2009–2012	drums	Doctrine (2011)
	Stephan Fimmers	2012–2013	bass	none
	Tim Yeung	2012	drums	none
	Dave Haley	2012–2014	drums	Obsideo (2013)
	Georg Maier	2013–2014	bass	Obsideo (2013)
	Septimiu Hărşan	2016–2020	drums	"Hypnotic" (2018); Hadeon (2018)
	Santiago Dobles	2016–2017	guitars	"Hypnotic" (2018); Hadeon (2018)
	Alan Goldstein	2017	bass	none
	Tilen Hudrap	2017–2018	bass	"Hypnotic" (2018); Hadeon (2018)
	Calin Paraschiv	2017–2019	guitars	none
	Edward Negrea	2018–2019	bass	none
	Rutger van Noordenburg	2019–2025	guitars	Exitivm (2021); Levels of Perception (2024)
	Joost van der Graaf	2019–2023	bass	Exitivm (2021); Levels of Perception (2024)
	Roel Käller	2023–2025	bass	none
	Dario Rudić	2025–2026	bass	none

== Lineups ==
Period	Members	Releases
Early 1986	Patrick Mameli — drums; Randy Meinhard — guitars; Chuck Colli — bass, vocals	none
Spring/summer 1986	Patrick Mameli — guitars, vocals; Randy Meinhard — guitars; Marco Foddis — drums; Gerrit Ulrich — bass	none
Fall 1986–September 1987	Patrick Mameli — guitars, vocals bass; Randy Meinhard — guitars; Marco Foddis — drums	Dysentery (1987)
September 1987–December 1988	Patrick Mameli — guitars, bass; Randy Meinhard — guitars; Marco Foddis — drums; Martin van Drunen — bass, vocals	The Penance (1987); "Hatred Within" (1988); Malleus Maleficarum (1988); Chronicles of the Scourge (2006) — 1988 tracks
January–March 1989	Patrick Mameli — guitars; Marco Foddis — drums; Martin van Drunen — vocals; Patrick Uterwijk — guitars; Sebastian Dooijes — bass	none
March 1989–fall 1990	Patrick Mameli — guitars, bass; Marco Foddis — drums; Martin van Drunen — bass, vocals; Patrick Uterwijk — guitars	Consuming Impulse (1989); Chronicles of the Scourge (2006) — 1989 tracks
Late 1990–early 1991	Patrick Mameli — guitars, vocals; Marco Foddis — drums; Patrick Uterwijk — guitars; Nick Sagia — bass	none
Early 1991–summer 1992	Patrick Mameli — guitars, vocals; Marco Foddis — drums; Patrick Uterwijk — guitars; Tony Choy — bass	Testimony of the Ancients (1991); Presence of the Pest (2016) — seven tracks
Summer 1992	Patrick Mameli — guitars, vocals; Marco Foddis — drums; Patrick Uterwijk — guitars; Jack Dodd — bass (stand-in)	Presence of the Pest (2016) — ten tracks
1992–1994	Patrick Mameli — guitars, vocals; Patrick Uterwijk — guitars; Marco Foddis — drums; Jeroen Paul Thesseling — bass	Spheres (1993); Reflections of the Mind (2016)
Band inactive 1994–2007
January–March 2008	Patrick Mameli — guitars, vocals; Tony Choy — bass; Peter Wildoer — drums	none
March 2008–August 2009	Patrick Mameli — guitars, vocals; Tony Choy — bass; Peter Wildoer — drums; Patrick Uterwijk — guitars (touring)	Resurrection Macabre (2009)
October–December 2009	Patrick Mameli — guitars, vocals; Patrick Uterwijk — guitars; Jeroen Paul Thesseling — bass	none
December 2009–February 2012	Patrick Mameli — guitars, vocals; Patrick Uterwijk — guitars; Jeroen Paul Thesseling — bass; Yuma Van Eekelen — drums	Doctrine (2011)
February–July 2012	Patrick Mameli — guitars, vocals; Patrick Uterwijk — guitars; Stephan Fimmers — bass; Tim Yeung — drums	none
July 2012–February 2013	Patrick Mameli — guitars, vocals; Patrick Uterwijk — guitars; Stephan Fimmers — bass; Dave Haley — drums	none
February 2013–July 2014	Patrick Mameli — guitars, vocals; Patrick Uterwijk — guitars; Dave Haley — drums; Georg Maier — bass	Obsideo (2013)
Band inactive August 2014–September 2016
October 2016–February 2017	Patrick Mameli — guitars, vocals; Tony Choy — bass; Santiago Dobles — guitars; Septimiu Hărşan — drums	none
February–April 2017	Patrick Mameli — guitars, vocals; Santiago Dobles — guitars; Septimiu Hărşan — drums; Alan Goldstein — bass	none
April–November 2017	Patrick Mameli — guitars, vocals; Santiago Dobles — guitars; Septimiu Hărşan — drums; Tilen Hudrap — bass	"Hypnotic" (2018); Hadeon (2018)
November 2017–December 2018	Patrick Mameli — guitars, vocals; Septimiu Hărşan — drums; Tilen Hudrap — bass; Calin Paraschiv — guitars	none
December 2018–June 2019	Patrick Mameli — guitars, vocals; Calin Paraschiv — guitars; Septimiu Hărşan — drums; Edward Negrea — bass	none
June–December 2019	Patrick Mameli — guitars, vocals; Septimiu Hărşan — drums; Edward Negrea — bass; Rutger van Noordenburg — guitars	none
December 2019–June 2020	Patrick Mameli — guitars, vocals; Rutger van Noordenburg — guitars; Septimiu Hărşan — drums; Joost van der Graaf — bass	none
June 2020–July 2023	Patrick Mameli — guitars, vocals; Rutger van Noordenburg — guitars; Joost van der Graaf — bass; Michiel van der Plicht — drums	Exitivm (2021); Levels of Perception (2024)
July 2023–January 2025	Patrick Mameli — guitars, vocals; Rutger van Noordenburg — guitars; Michiel van der Plicht — drums; Roel Käller — bass	none
January 2025–September 2025	Patrick Mameli — guitars, vocals; Michiel van der Plicht — drums; Roel Käller — bass; Max Blok — guitars	none
November 2025–August 2026	Patrick Mameli — guitars, vocals; Michiel van der Plicht — drums; Max Blok — guitars; Dario Rudić — bass	none
August 2026–present	Patrick Mameli — guitars, vocals; Michiel van der Plicht — drums; Max Blok — guitars	none to date
