= Mind Reflections =

1994 greatest hits album by Pestilence

Greatest hits album by Pestilence
- Released: 1994
- Genre: Death metal; progressive death metal
- Length: 66:33
- Label: Roadrunner

Pestilence chronology
Spheres (1993)	Mind Reflections (1994)	Resurrection Macabre (2009)

Professional ratings
Review scores
Source	Rating
Allmusic	link

Mind Reflections is a compilation album by Dutch death metal band Pestilence, featuring both studio and live songs.

== Track listing ==
No.	Title	Length
1.	"Out of the Body" (from Consuming Impulse)	4:40
2.	"Twisted Truth" (from Testimony of the Ancients)	4:04
3.	"The Process of Suffocation" (from Consuming Impulse)	2:41
4.	"Parricide" (from Malleus Maleficarum)	3:49
5.	"Mind Reflections" (from Spheres)	3:22
6.	"Dehydrated" (from Consuming Impulse)	3:09
7.	"Land of Tears" (from Testimony of the Ancients)	4:48
8.	"Hatred Within"	6:47
9.	"The Secrecies of Horror" (from Testimony of the Ancients)	4:56
10.	"Subordinate to the Domination" (from Malleus Maleficarum)	4:18
11.	"Dehydrated" (live)	3:31
12.	"Chemotherapy" (live)	4:27
13.	"Presence of the Dead" (live)	5:54
14.	"Testimony" (live)	4:30
15.	"Chronic Infection" (live)	3:58
16.	"Out of the Body" (live)	5:09
Total length:		66:33
