= Resurrection Macabre =

Studio album by Pestilence
- Released: 16 March 2009
- Recorded: 17–31 October 2008 at Hansen Studios in Ribe, Denmark
- Genre: Death metal
- Length: 40:31
- Label: Mascot Records
- Producer: Jacob Hansen, Patyek K. Jewlett

Pestilence chronology
Spheres (1993)	Resurrection Macabre (2009)	Doctrine (2011)

Professional ratings
Review scores
Source	Rating
About.com	3.5/5 stars
Allmusic	4/5 stars
Blabbermouth	7.5/10 stars
Sputnikmusic	3.5/5 stars

Resurrection Macabre is the fifth studio album by Dutch death metal band Pestilence, which was released on 16 March 2009. It is the band's first album of original material in 16 years, since 1993's Spheres and this fact is referenced in the album's title; hence resurrection. Re-recordings of earlier Pestilence songs make appearances as bonus tracks on the record.

== Background ==
Pestilence were broken up between 1994 and early 2008. In January 2008, frontman Patrick Mameli revealed to Blabbermouth.net that the band was planning on making a return because "people/fans keep asking me for this. The time is right now and Mascot is giving me the opportunity to do so. As you know, I have always been the driving force behind Pestilence, writing all the music and so forth, so that I can state: I will bring back Pestilence to life. More tech and way more brutal than ever before."

In October 2008, Mameli revealed to UK's Terrorizer magazine that Pestilence would enter a studio in Denmark on 17 October with both the producers. By 31 October Mameli states, "everything will have to be recorded and mixed. Then the album will come out somewhere around March 2009. And by April, we'll do a three-week European tour before doing as much shows as possible on the summer festivals circuit."

== Track listing ==
All tracks are written by Patrick Mameli.

No.	Title	Length
1.	"Devouring Frenzy"	2:54
2.	"Horror Detox"	3:20
3.	"Fiend"	3:29
4.	"Hate Suicide"	4:18
5.	"Synthetic Grotesque"	3:57
6.	"Neuro Dissonance"	3:28
7.	"Dehydrated II"	3:47
8.	"Resurrection Macabre"	3:47
9.	"Hangman"	2:52
10.	"Y2H"	3:39
11.	"In Sickness and Death"	5:00
Total length:		40:31

Bonus tracks
No.	Title	Length
12.	"Chemo Therapy" (re-recorded from Malleus Maleficarum)	4:59
13.	"Out of the Body" (re-recorded from Consuming Impulse)	4:31
14.	"Lost Souls" (re-recorded from Testimony of the Ancients)	4:32

== Personnel ==
=== Pestilence ===
- Patrick Mameli – vocals, guitars
- Tony Choy – bass
- Peter Wildoer – drums

=== Production ===
- Jacob Hansen - mixing, mastering
- Jeppe Anderson - production
- Marko Saarelainen - design, artwork, layout
