= Aghora (band) =

American progressive metal band

- Origin: Miami, Florida, United States
- Genres: Progressive metal
- Years active: 1995–present
- Label: Season of Mist
- Members: Santiago Dobles; Alan Goldstein; Matt Thompson
- Past members: Max Dible; Chris Penny; Andy Deluca; Sean Reinert; Charlie Ekendahl; Danishta Rivero; Sean Malone; Richard Komatz; Ian Hayes; Giann Rubio; Diana Serra

Aghora is a progressive metal band formed in 1995 by guitarist Santiago Dobles. In 2000 they released their first album, Aghora, recorded and produced by Santiago Dobles and Dan Escauriza in 1999, Miami, Florida. The album featured Sean Malone and Sean Reinert, both members of Cynic. The band released its second album, Formless in 2006, which was produced by Santiago Dobles and mixed by Neil Kernon. In 2019 Aghora released their 3rd album Entheogenic Frequencies which was recorded, mixed and produced by Santiago Dobles. The album features Gustavo Dobles on keyboards, Matt Thompson (King Diamond) on drums, Alan Goldstein on bass, and Santiago Dobles on guitar.

== Members ==
=== Current members ===
Name	Instrument	Years	Other groups
Santiago Dobles	guitar	1995―present	Pestilence, Cynic, Order of Ennead, Council of the Fallen
Alan Goldstein	bass	2001–2002, 2006–present	Red Lamb, Pestilence
Matt Thompson	drums	2008–present	King Diamond, Legacy of Disorder

=== Former members ===
- Max Dible – guitar (1995–1997)
- Chris Penny – drums (1995–1997)
- Andy Deluca – bass (1995–1999, 2004–2005)
- Sean Reinert – drums (1997–2000)
- Charlie Ekendahl – guitar (1997–2002)
- Danishta Rivero – vocals (1997–2005)
- Sean Malone – bass (1999–2000)
- Richard Komatz – drums (2001–2002)
- Ian Hayes – drums (2004–2005)
- Giann Rubio – drums (2006–2007)
- Alex Meade - guitar (2005–2006)
- Diana Serra – vocals (2006–2009)

== Discography ==
=== Studio albums ===
- Aghora (2000)
- Formless (2006)
- Entheogenic Frequencies (2019)

=== Compilations ===
- Transitions (2006)
