= Obsideo =

Studio album by Pestilence
- Released: October 21, 2013
- Genre: Death metal
- Length: 34:18
- Label: Candlelight Records
- Producer: Patrick Mameli

Pestilence chronology
Doctrine (2011)	Obsideo (2013)	Hadeon (2018)

Professional ratings
Review scores
Source	Rating
Chronicles of Chaos	5/10 stars

Obsideo is the seventh studio album by Dutch death metal band Pestilence. It was released on October 21, 2013 via Candlelight Records. The album was produced by the vocalist/guitarist Patrick Mameli, and their last before their two-year hiatus from 2014 to 2016. According to Mameli, the album's overall lyrical theme is "the journey of the human soul." This is the final Pestilence album to feature lead and rhythm guitarist Patrick Uterwijk, who had been with the band since Consuming Impulse in 1989.

== Track listing ==
All lyrics are written by Patrick Mameli

No.	Title	Music	Length
1.	"Obsideo"	Mameli	4:00
2.	"Displaced"	Mameli	3:17
3.	"Aura Negative"	Mameli, Uterwijk	3:38
4.	"Necromorph"	Mameli	3:17
5.	"Laniatus"	Mameli, Uterwijk	3:09
6.	"Distress"	Mameli	3:53
7.	"Soulrot"	Mameli	3:22
8.	"Saturation"	Mameli	3:07
9.	"Transition"	Mameli, Uterwijk	3:08
10.	"Super Conscious"	Mameli	3:27

== Credits ==
=== Pestilence ===
- Patrick Mameli - vocals, lead & rhythm guitar
- Patrick Uterwijk - lead & rhythm guitar
- George Maier - bass guitar
- David Haley - drums

=== Production ===
- Patrick Mameli - producer
- Christian Moos - engineering, mixing
- Tim Turan - mastering
- Stefan Schipper - photography
- Santiago Jaramillo - design, layout, art direction, cover art
