= Doctrine (album) =

Studio album by Pestilence
- Released: April 24, 2011
- Recorded: Woodshed Studio in southern Germany
- Genre: Death metal
- Length: 39:22
- Label: Mascot Records
- Producer: Victor "V.Santura" Bullok

Pestilence chronology
Resurrection Macabre (2009)	Doctrine (2011)	Obsideo (2013)

Doctrine is the sixth studio album by Dutch death metal band Pestilence, which was released on April 24, 2011. The album was recorded and mixed at Woodshed Studio in southern Germany with engineer Victor "V.Santura" Bullok. The artwork was designed by Marko Saarelainen. The album represents a second release by the reformed Pestilence, with two new members: Yuma van Eekelen and Jeroen Paul Thesseling, who was a member of the band during the Spheres era. Technically, the album is an experimentation with very low tunings, with Mameli and Uterwijk playing on 8-string guitars with standard tuning, and Thesseling playing a 7-string fretless bass tuned in F#.

== Reception ==
Professional ratings
Review scores
Source	Rating
Thrash Magazine	4.5/5 stars
Heavy Blog is Heavy	1.5/5 stars
Metal Hammer	5/7 stars
Metal Review	6.5/10 stars

The album has received mixed reviews, with much of the criticism pointed to the album's down tuned guitar sound, as well as Patrick Mameli's vocals.

== Track listing ==
All lyrics are written by Patrick Mameli; all music is composed by Mameli, except "Doctrine" by Mameli and Patrick Uterwijk.

No.	Title	Length
1.	"The Predication"	2:00
2.	"Amgod"	3:33
3.	"Doctrine"	3:07
4.	"Salvation"	3:40
5.	"Dissolve"	3:39
6.	"Absolution"	3:38
7.	"Sinister"	3:58
8.	"Divinity"	4:06
9.	"Deception"	3:57
10.	"Malignant"	3:49
11.	"Confusion"	3:55
Total length:		39:22

== Credits ==
=== Personnel ===
- Patrick Mameli – vocals, lead & rhythm guitar
- Patrick Uterwijk – lead & rhythm guitar
- Jeroen Paul Thesseling – Fretless Bass
- Yuma Van Eekelen – drums

=== Production ===
- Victor "V.Santura" Bullok - mixing, mastering
- Victor Bullok - engineering, production
- Marko Saarelainen - artwork, layout
