= Hadeon =

Hadeon may refer to:

- Hadeon, form of quark related to hadron
- Hadeon, List of Fables characters
- Hadeon (album), 2018 album by Pestilence
