= Formlessness =

Formlessness may refer to:

- The lack of form
- Chaos (cosmogony), the formless or void state preceding the creation of the universe in the Greek creation myths
- Trailokya, world of formlessness, a noncorporeal realm populated with four heavens, possible rebirth destination for practitioners of the four formlessness stages
- Arupadhatu (the world of formlessness) in Borobudur
- Tohu wa-bohu (redirect from Formless and void), Genesis before creation
- Formless, book by Rosalind E. Krauss
- Formless, the 2nd album from progressive metal band Aghora, released in December, 2006
- Formlessness, an EP by American indie rock band The World Is a Beautiful Place & I Am No Longer Afraid to Die
