= Aghora (album) =

Studio album by Aghora
- Released: March 24, 2000
- Recorded: 1999
- Genre: Progressive metal; jazz fusion
- Length: 55:23
- Label: Dobles Productions
- Producer: Santiago Dobles, Dan Escauriza

Aghora chronology
Aghora (2000)	Transitions (2006)

Professional ratings
Review scores
Source	Rating
SputnikMusic	9.5/10 stars

Aghora is the self-titled debut album by progressive metal band Aghora, released on March 24, 2000. "Jazz-metal" is another style commonly associated with this band. The album features Sean Reinert and Sean Malone from Cynic.

== Track listing ==
1. "Immortal Bliss" – 4:34
2. "Satya" – 5:55
3. "Transfiguration" – 5:14
4. "Frames" – 7:09
5. "Mind's Reality" – 4:22
6. "Kali Yuga" – 5:37
7. "Jivatma" – 11:17
8. "Existence" – 6:28
9. "Anugraha" – 4:41

== Personnel ==
- Danishta Rivero – vocals
- Santiago Dobles – lead guitar, coral sitar, programming
- Charlie Ekendahl – rhythm guitar
- Sean Malone – fretless bass, chapman stick, piano
- Sean Reinert – drums, tabla, percussion
