= Exitivm =

Studio album by Pestilence
- Released: 25 June 2021
- Genre: Technical death metal; progressive metal
- Length: 38:58
- Label: Agonia

Pestilence chronology
Hadeon (2018)	Exitivm (2021)

Singles from Exitivm
- 1. "Morbvs Propagationem" Released: 15 April 2021; 2. "Deificvs" Released: 26 May 2021

Professional ratings
Review scores
Source	Rating
Metal Forces	8/10
metalitalia.com	7.5/10

Exitium (stylized as Exitivm) is the ninth studio album by Dutch death metal band Pestilence. It was released on 25 June 2021, after having been signed to Agonia Records. Because Septimiu Hărşan had to leave the band due to restrictions caused by the COVID-19 pandemic, he was replaced by Michiel van der Plicht (God Dethroned and Carach Angren) who has since become a full-time member. It is also the band's only album with bassist Joost van der Graaf and guitarist Rutger van Noordenburg.

== Track listing ==
Exitivm track listing
No.	Title	Length
1.	"In Omnibvs (Intro)"	2:45
2.	"Morbvs Propagationem"	3:20
3.	"Deificvs"	3:35
4.	"Sempiternvs"	3:41
5.	"Internicionem"	3:36
6.	"Mortifervm"	3:49
7.	"Dominatvi Svbmissa"	3:08
8.	"Pericvlvm Externvm"	3:24
9.	"Inficiat"	3:03
10.	"Exitivm"	3:09
11.	"Immortvos"	3:17
12.	"Personatvs Mortem (Outro)"	2:11
Total length:		38:58

== Personnel ==
- Patrick Mameli – guitars, vocals
- Rutger van Noordenburg – guitars
- Joost van der Graaf – bass guitar
- Michiel van der Plicht – drums

== Charts ==
Chart performance for Exitivm
Chart (2021)	Peak position
Dutch Albums (Album Top 100)	89
German Albums (Offizielle Top 100)	79
Swiss Albums (Schweizer Hitparade)	39
