= Transitions (Aghora album) =

Compilation album by Aghora
- Released: March 2006
- Recorded: 1997–1999
- Genre: Progressive metal; jazz fusion
- Length: 33:24
- Label: Dobles Productions
- Producer: Santiago Dobles, Dan Escauriza

Aghora chronology
Aghora (2000)	Transitions (2006)	Formless (2006)

Transitions is a collection of demo songs that eventually became the bulk of the self-titled debut album by progressive metal band Aghora, released in March, 2006.

== Track listing ==
1. "Satya" - 5:25
2. "Frames" - 5:06
3. "Kali Yuga" - 5:46
4. "Existence" - 3:45
5. "Transfiguration" - 4:17
6. "Mind's Reality" - 4:55
7. "Immortal Bliss" - 4:15

== Credits ==
- Danishta Rivero — vocals
- Santiago Dobles — lead guitar, coral sitar, programming
- Charlie Ekendahl — rhythm guitar
- Andy Deluca — bass guitar
- Sean Reinert — drums, tabla, percussion
