= Hadeon (album) =

Studio album by Pestilence
- Released: 26 January 2018
- Recorded: 2017
- Genre: Technical death metal; progressive metal
- Length: 39:17
- Label: Hammerheart

Pestilence chronology
Obsideo (2013)	Hadeon (2018)	Exitivm (2021)

Singles from Hadeon
- 1. "Multi Dimensional" Released: 19 December 2017; 2. "Non Physical Existent" Released: 10 January 2018

Professional ratings
Review scores
Source	Rating
Metal Hammer	7/10
Metal Forces	9/10
Metal Storm	7.5/10

Hadeon is the eighth studio album by Dutch death metal band Pestilence. It was released digitally on 26 January 2018, nearly two months ahead of its scheduled release date; a physical component of the album was released on 9 March 2018. Hadeon is the band's first album since their two-year hiatus from 2014 to 2016, and the first one since Malleus Maleficarum (1988) not to feature longtime lead and rhythm guitarist Patrick Uterwijk.

== Track listing ==
All music is composed by Mameli, except where noted.

No.	Title	Music	Length
1.	"Unholy Transcript"		1:55
2.	"Non Physical Existent"		3:28
3.	"Multi Dimensional"		3:15
4.	"Oversoul"		3:22
5.	"Materialization"		2:54
6.	"Astral Projection"		3:42
7.	"Discarnate Entity"		3:34
8.	"Subvisions"	Hudrap	1:17
9.	"Manifestations"		3:29
10.	"Timeless"		2:45
11.	"Ultra Demons"		3:13
12.	"Layers of Reality"		2:39
13.	"Electro Magnetic"		3:44
Total length:			39:17

== Personnel ==
- Patrick Mameli – guitars, vocals
- Tilen Hudrap – bass
- Septimiu Hărşan – drums
- Santiago Dobles – guitars
