= Formless =

Studio album by Aghora
- Released: December 2006
- Recorded: 2006
- Genres: Progressive metal; jazz fusion
- Length: 70:43
- Labels: Dobles Productions, Season of Mist
- Producers: Santiago Dobles, Neil Kernon

Aghora chronology
Transitions (2006)	Formless (2006)	Entheogenic Frequencies (2019)

Singles from Formless
- 1. "Atmas Heave" Released: December 3, 2006

Formless is the second album from progressive metal band Aghora, released in December 2006. This is their first album with vocalist Diana Serra.

== Track listing ==
1. Lotus – 1:14
2. Atmas Heave – 5:10
3. Moksha – 5:29
4. Open Close the Book – 4:58
5. Garuda – 2:53
6. Dual Alchemy – 5:36
7. Dime – 7:00
8. 1316 – 5:30
9. Fade – 4:40
10. Skinned – 6:41
11. Mahayana – 7:16
12. Formless – 12:31
13. Purification – 1:45

== Credits ==
=== Aghora ===
- Diana Serra — vocals
- Santiago Dobles — lead guitar, banjo, fretless guitar, programming
- Alan Goldstein — bass guitar
- Giann Rubio — drums (tracks 2–3, 7, 11–12), tabla, percussion
- Sean Reinert — drums (tracks 4–6, 8–10)

=== Additional personnel ===
- Alan Douches — mastering
- Eliran Kantor — artwork and design
- Santiago Dobles — producer/engineer
- Neil Kernon — producer/mixer
- Travis Huff — drums tracking
- Daniel Escauriza — additional engineering and tracking
- Jeff Lewis — assistant engineering
- Colton Pasker — assistant engineering
- Nick Bati Grubisich — assistant engineering
