= Testimony of the Ancients =

Studio album by Pestilence
- Released: September 6, 1991
- Recorded: March–April 1991 in Tampa, Florida (USA)
- Genre: Progressive death metal
- Length: 42:56
- Label: Roadrunner
- Producer: Scott Burns

Pestilence chronology
Consuming Impulse (1989)	Testimony of the Ancients (1991)	Spheres (1993)

Professional ratings
Review scores
Source	Rating
Allmusic	4/5 stars
Metal Storm	7.5/10

Testimony of the Ancients is the third album by the Dutch death metal band Pestilence, released in 1991 on Roadrunner Records. This was their first release with a new lineup, with Tony Choy replacing Martin van Drunen on bass, (Note: Technically, Choy only replaced van Drunen on bass live, as Mameli recorded bass on the band's first two albums, Malleus Maleficarum and Consuming Impulse.) while guitarist Patrick Mameli filled in for the latter on vocals.

Testimony of the Ancients is a concept album, exploring themes such as philosophy.

Testimony of the Ancients was reissued, along with Consuming Impulse, on Roadrunner Records' Two from the Vault series.

== Music and lyrics ==
Following the departure of former bassist/vocalist Martin van Drunen, guitarist Patrick Mameli took over vocal duties. Mameli steered the band towards a more melodic and technical approach, expanding on the death metal sound of its predecessor Consuming Impulse. According to Ultimate Guitar senior editor David Slavković, the album is "one of the first examples of experimentation" in death metal, incorporating progressive and jazz fusion elements. The album contrasts brutal death metal riffs with melodic interludes. The album also contains thrash metal riffs and "doomy" elements.

Each song on the album is followed by an instrumental outro track, which was an attempt by the band to "push [the genre's] boundaries." These brief interludes incorporate unorthodox timbres for death metal, such as acoustic guitar, samples of orchestral arrangements, and pianos. The album's guitar solos have been described as "melodic, jazz inflected, soaring, and emotive."

Testimony of the Ancients is a concept album. The album's lyrics explored topics that John Serba of AllMusic described as "strangely philosophical". He explained that the album's themes were "Harmony [verus] chaos, melody [versus] brutality, the concept of eternity [versus] the limitations of a man's mind."

== Track listing ==
All lyrics are written by Marco Foddis; all music is composed by Patrick Mameli except where noted.

No.	Title	Music	Length
1.	"The Secrecies of Horror"	Patrick Mameli, Patrick Uterwijk	4:56
2.	"Bitterness" (instrumental)	Mameli, Uterwijk	0:30
3.	"Twisted Truth"	Mameli, Uterwijk	4:02
4.	"Darkening" (instrumental)		0:30
5.	"Lost Souls"		3:40
6.	"Blood" (instrumental)		0:28
7.	"Land of Tears"		4:47
8.	"Free Us from Temptation" (instrumental)		0:31
9.	"Prophetic Revelations"		5:21
10.	"Impure" (instrumental)		0:59
11.	"Testimony"		3:51
12.	"Soulless" (instrumental)	Tony Choy	0:32
13.	"Presence of the Dead"		5:50
14.	"MindWarp" (instrumental)		0:25
15.	"Stigmatized"	Mameli, Uterwijk	5:23
16.	"In Sorrow" (instrumental)		1:11
Total length:			42:56

== Personnel ==
Pestilence

- Patrick Mameli - guitar, vocals
- Patrick Uterwijk - guitar
- Tony Choy - bass
- Marco Foddis - drums

Additional musicians

- Kent Smith - keyboards

== Production ==
- arranged by Pestilence
- produced by Pestilence & Scott Burns
- recorded, engineered & mixed By Scott Burns
- mastered by Eddy Schreyer
- cover art by Dan Seagrave
