= Santiago Dobles =

- Birth name: Santiago Dobles
- Born: November 17, 1976 (age 48); Caracas, Venezuela
- Genres: Progressive metal, technical metal, jazz fusion
- Instrument(s): Guitar, vocals
- Years active: 1995–present
- Labels: Season of Mist

Santiago Dobles is a Venezuelan guitarist, songwriter, producer and son of Venezuelan symphonic composer Gustavo Dobles. He is best known as the founding member of tech-prog-fusion metal band Aghora. He has produced with Dan Escuariza, and Neil Kernon. Kernon produced Formless cd. Dan did the self-titled debut cd.

== Biography ==
Santiago Dobles was born in Caracas, Venezuela. He started playing guitar at age 11. As a teenager, he studied under Jae Valentine and Robin Stone. At age 18 he attended Berklee College of Music in Boston, majoring in composition, film scoring and guitar. While at Berklee, he studied fusion guitar under the guidance of Jon Finn, Mark White, Mashi Hasu, & Bruce Bartlett. Outside of Berklee, he studied guitar with Paul Masvidal (of Death and Cynic fame), Paul Aldanee and through correspondence with Derek Taylor (Shrapnel recording artist) and Derryl Gabel. He also studied sound engineering at Miami Dade Community College. Santiago practices yoga, Qigong and Pencak Silat (teaching the latter two). His father Gustavo Dobles musician director and composer his Mother Solange Rivero TV Prorducer and Actors, TV directors TV producer and writes agent ( Aisha Enterprises, Inc) both Venezuelan

Santiago also released an instructional guitar "Chops from Hell" DVD entitled "Shut up and Play".

== Musical style ==
Santiago Dobles is known for his use of Bb Tuning, oriental scales, rapid alternate picking and sweep picked legato arpeggios that can cover all seven strings in certain runs. A good example would be from "Garuda", off of their 2006 album Formless, where Santiago repeatedly plays a lick starting on the twelfth fret of the high Eb string and ending in an open (low) Bb string rhythm, a lick that spans across three octaves and a fourth. He also ends the song with a pair sweep picked legato arpeggios that cover all seven strings of his guitar. in 2011 / 2012 Santiago was the composer and producer for the incidental music for the telenovela Grachi ( Nick Latino America ) Specialties:

Audio Recording, Music Editor, Mixing, Mastering Guitar sessions, Composition, Film Scoring & Telenovela Scoring Owns Full Pro Tools HD operational Studio with state of the art plug ins and Analog outboard gear. Music editor

2012 - Music editing full Pro Tools Mixing and mastering for TV channel IMAGINA for TV show " La Virgen Morena"

2012 - Music editing full Pro Tools Mixing and mastering for TV channel IMAGINA for TV show "La Liga"

2012 - Music Editing & Full Mix & Master for Promo Film/Imagina USA & TV Channel National Geographic TV Show "Dr Vet"

2011 - Composed recorded Mixed & Mastered and co produced 4 songs on the Sound Track for Nickelodeon Show "Grachi" Featuring Isabella Castillo 2011 - 2012 worked on Soundtrack and film score for independent film through A Choy music Publishing.

2011 - 2012 worked on Soundtrack and film score for independent film through A Choy music Publishing.

2010 - 2012 worked with Grammy songwriter Tony Choy and co produced full length Album Synchronicity that is now internationally released. 2005 - 2012 recorded, mixed and produced over 24 professional Full length Albums for recording clients at Dobles Audio Studios

== Equipment ==
- Amplifiers : Madison Divinity II head and cab.
- Pedals: Ibanez Tube Screamer, MXR phase 90, MXR Dyno Comp, Boss DS1, Boss TU2, Digitech 2101 pro, Dunlop Crybaby wah-wah pedal, EBow, Pigtronix OFO 'Disnortion' Pedal.

== Discography ==
2011 - Composed recorded Mixed & Mastered and co produced 4 songs on the Sound Track for Nickelodeon Show "Grachi" Featuring Isabella Castillo 2011 - 2012 worked on Soundtrack and film score for independent film through A Choy music Publishing. 2011 - 2012 worked on Soundtrack and film score for independent film through A Choy music Publishing. 2010 - 2012 worked with Grammy songwriter Tony Choy and co produced full length Album Synchronicity that is now internationally released. 2005 - 2012 recorded, mixed and produced over 24 professional Full length Albums for recording clients at Dobles Audio Studios

- With Aghora:

Aghora (album) (2000)

Transitions (2006)

Formless (2006)

Entheogenic Frequencies (2019)

- Guest Appearances:

The Absence - Riders of the Plague guitars on track 3 (2007)

Alan Goldstein "Bass Sketches" - (2006)

Silenmara - Solo on Delerium Tremens of the album Collection of Conscience (2011)

Tourniquet - Antiseptic Bloodbath guitar solos on tracks 6 & 8 (2012)

Pestilence Hadeon lead guitar (2018)

== See also ==
- Aghora
- Cynic (band)
- Death (metal band)
- Pestilence (band)
