= Pestilence (band) =

Dutch death metal band

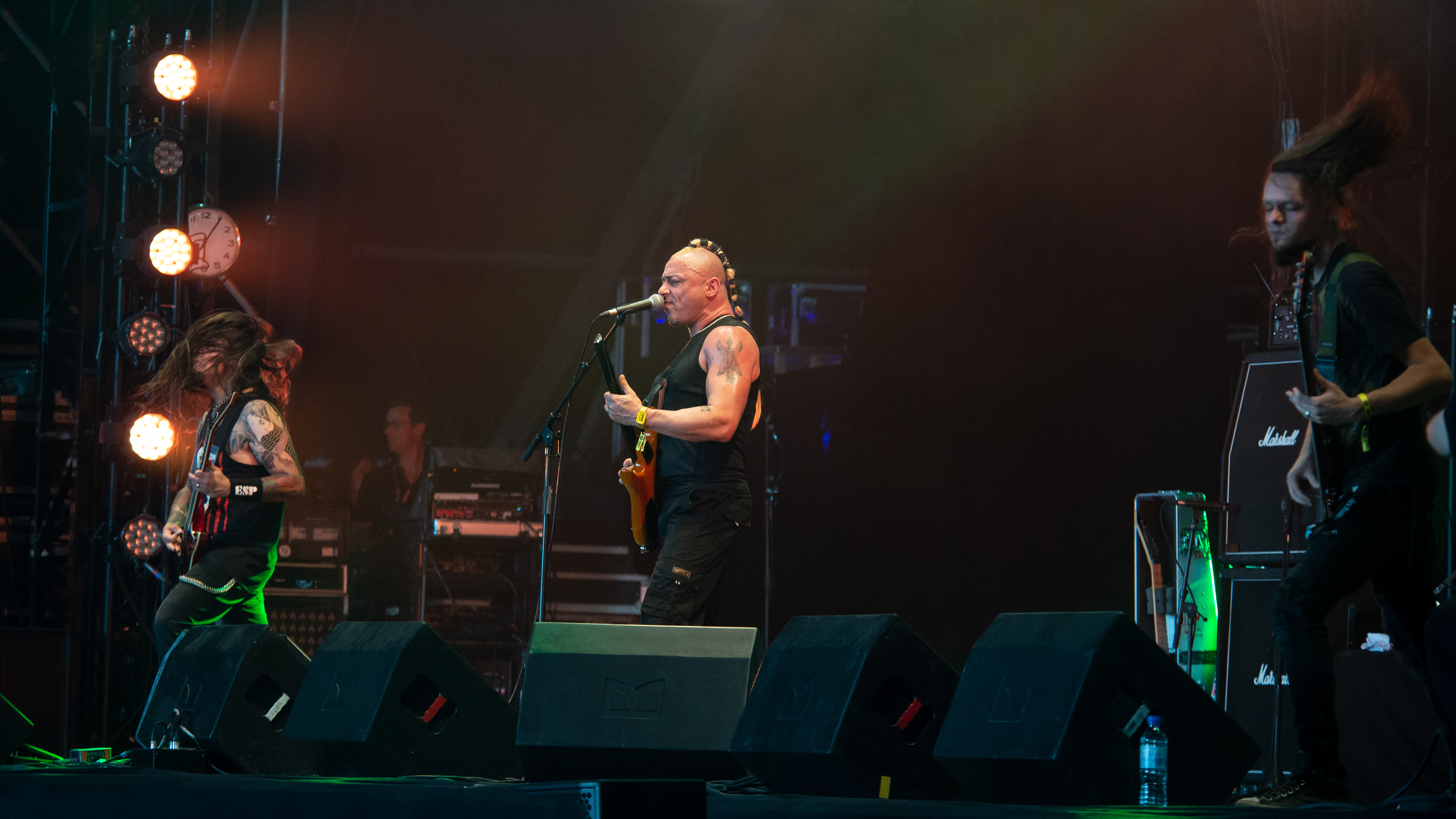
- Pestilence at Hellfest 2019

Background information
- Origin: Enschede, Netherlands
- Genres: Death metal; technical death metal; thrash metal (early)
- Works: Discography section
- Years active: 1986–1994; 2008–2014; 2016–present
- Labels: Roadrunner; Mascot; Candlelight; Hammerheart; Agonia
- Members: Patrick Mameli; Michiel van der Plicht; Max Blok
- Past members: List of Pestilence band members

Pestilence is a Dutch death metal band founded in Enschede in 1986. Despite various lineup changes, guitarist-vocalist Patrick Mameli remains the sole constant member. After disbanding in 1994 to pursue other musical directions, Pestilence reunited in 2008, but was put on "permanent hold" in July 2014. The band reunited again in October 2016. Pestilence has released ten studio albums, and are one of technical death metal's "big four", with Death, Atheist, and Cynic.

== History ==
=== Early career (1986–1990) ===
Formed in the Netherlands in mid-1986, Pestilence was a thrash metal band consisting of Patrick Mameli (guitar, vocals), Randy Meinhard (guitar), and Marco Foddis (drums). They recorded two demos; after the first, Martin van Drunen (bass, vocals) joined them. After signing with Roadrunner Records, Pestilence released their debut album, Malleus Maleficarum, in 1988.

Pestilence recruited guitarist Patrick Uterwijk. Their 1989 second album, Consuming Impulse, shifted toward heavier, more haunting death metal. Martin van Drunen transitioned from cleaner vocals to an acidic growl. The release gained Pestilence international attention and worldwide acclaim among death metal fans.

The band toured to support Consuming Impulse playing with Celtic Frost, Death, Carcass, Napalm Death, Morbid Angel, Bolt Thrower, and others. Before working on their third album, the lineup changed again; vocalist and bassist Martin van Drunen left to front Asphyx.

In 1990, Pestilence toured Europe with Autopsy and Bolt Thrower.

=== Success and breakthrough (1991–1994) ===
Pestilence faced replacing members again, lacking a vocalist and bassist. For their third album, Testimony of the Ancients (1991), they enlisted bassist Tony Choy from death metal band Cynic while Patrick Mameli took over vocals.

Testimony of the Ancients co-defined early progressive death metal alongside Piece of Time and Human. "Land of Tears" received heavy rotation on Headbangers Ball. Supporting Testimony of the Ancients, Pestilence toured with Death and shared dates with Napalm Death, Cannibal Corpse, Entombed and Dismember.

Tony Choy was never a permanent member and returned to Florida to play with Atheist. Meanwhile, Pestilence enlisted Jeroen Paul Thesseling.

Over the years, Pestilence members explored other genres, primarily jazz fusion. Their fourth album, Spheres (1993), was even more complex, mixing jazz elements with death metal and incorporating guitar synths throughout.

Pestilence's popularity grew with every album, but member tensions also rose. Soon, the band unanimously decided to split, feeling they had reached their creative climax.

=== Post-breakup (1995–2007) ===
In 1994, Roadrunner released one last Pestilence CD, a best-of titled Mind Reflections, containing tracks from all four albums, the rare "Hatred Within", and six unreleased 1992 Dynamo Open Air Festival live tracks. In 1998, Displeased Records re-released the debut album Malleus Maleficarum (originally unreleased in Europe), including the 1986 and 1987 demos.

In 2006, Metal War Productions and Martin van Drunen released Chronicles of the Scourge, containing two concert recordings and one unreleased bonus track. The concerts are Live "Kix Festival" – Veghel, Netherlands (24 June 1989) and Live Bochum, Germany (18 November 1988). The first 1000 copies included a bonus "rehearsal disc".

=== First reunion (2008–2013) ===
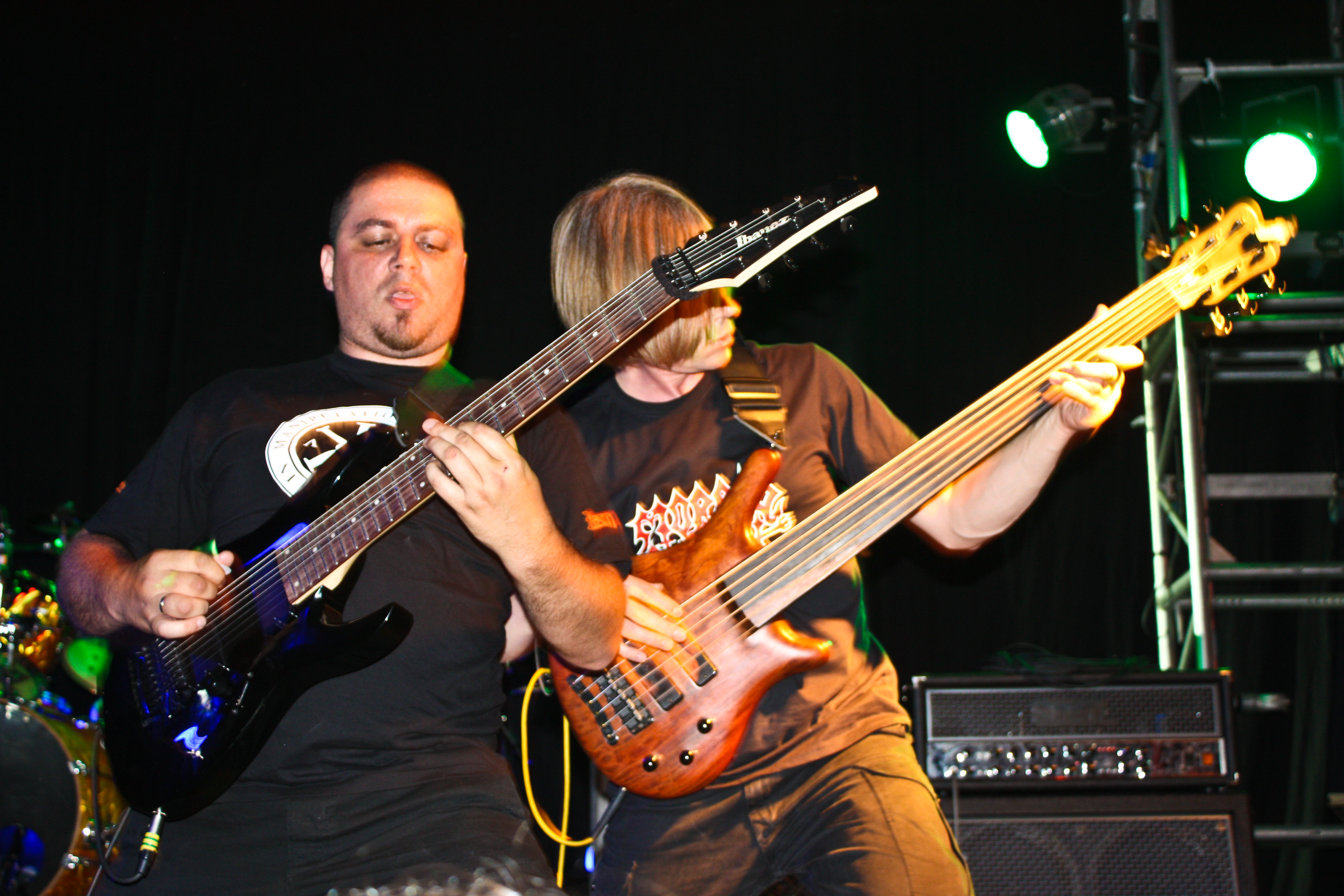
Patrick Mameli, Jeroen Paul Thesseling, live 2011

After a long period of inactivity, the band returned in January 2008. The reunion line-up consisted of Mameli on vocals and guitar, Tony Choy on bass and Peter Wildoer on drums. Speaking to Blabbermouth.net regarding his decision to resurrect the band, Mameli had this to say:

It's not a reunion, because I will not be playing with any of the old lineup guys, except Tony Choy, of course so... I always stated there WILL NEVER BE a reunion, and there won't be, since I never look back at the past and I refuse now to play with people that are not on the same musical level as I am.

I sang on Testimony and Spheres (two albums later from Consuming Impulse!!), so no need for Martin. This because of the above statement I just made. Furthermore, Martin is doing other things. Good for him.

So now you have two members that were in Pestilence before and one new guy.

The reason why I bring Pestilence back to life is that people/fans keep asking me for this. The time is right now and Mascot is giving me the opportunity to do so.

As you know, I have always been the driving force behind Pestilence, writing all the music and so forth, so that I can state: I will bring back Pestilence to life. More tech and way more brutal than ever before.

In 2008, Pestilence decided to write and record new music for an early 2009 release working with Danish producer Jacob Hansen. Titled Resurrection Macabre, it is their first original album in sixteen years (since 1993's Spheres). In March 2008, Patrick Uterwijk re-joined the band as second-guitarist, however he didn't play on Resurrection Macabre.

In October 2009, Jeroen Paul Thesseling re-joined Pestilence after fifteen years of separation from the band, replacing Tony Choy's bass position. In March 2010, Pestilence announced their first US summer tour in over 16 years which would begin at Maryland Deathfest at Sonar on 30 May. The reformed Pestilence released another album entitled Doctrine in April 2011.

On 22 February 2012, Patrick Mameli announced that Jeroen Paul Thesseling and Yuma van Eekelen both left Pestilence, to commit more on their main projects, Thesseling's Salazh Trio, and van Eekelen's Exivious. Thesseling was replaced by Stephan Fimmers (Necrophagist), and van Eekelen was replaced by Tim Yeung (Morbid Angel, Divine Heresy, All That Remains, Hate Eternal). The new two members were also included in the recording session of the seventh Pestilence album, Obsideo.

=== Second breakup and reunion (2014–present) ===
On 8 July 2014, vocalist/guitarist Patrick Mameli announced that Pestilence was on a "permanent hold", as he wanted to "concentrate fully" on his new project Neuromorph.

On 4 October 2016, Pestilence announced on their Facebook page that they were once again active, and announced a new lineup, featuring Mameli on both guitar and vocals, Tony Choy on bass (later replaced by Tilen Hudrap), Santiago Dobles on lead guitar and Septimiu Hărşan on drums.

On 22 February 2017, the band announced via their Facebook page that a new album, titled Hadeon, was due to be released in 2017. The album's release date was later pushed back to 2018, and was finally released on 9 March 2018.

On 24 July 2018, shortly before the bands North America tour was to begin, the metal website MetalSucks reported on a 2017 Facebook post that they alleged showed Patrick Mameli on his personal Facebook profile, in response to a photo of him with blonde dreadlocks, responding to a comment that compared his look to Milli Vanilli with the statement in his native Dutch, "Je zegt dat ik een neger ben?" The site alleged that the use of "neger" translated to the racial epithet nigger. Along with the comment, MetalSucks also alleged that the singer also "propagates Jewish stereotypes", pointing to his support of United States President Donald Trump moving the nations embassy in Israel. Many commenters on the site pointed out that the website used a Facebook translation on the post that translated it to a-more offensive variant, while Google Translate would return "black" or "negro". Due to the controversy generated from the article, the band's entire U.S. tour was cancelled. In a post on Mameli's Facebook page, he stated, "Thanks to metalsucks and their followers, our US minitour has been cancelled by our U.S. promotor[sic]."

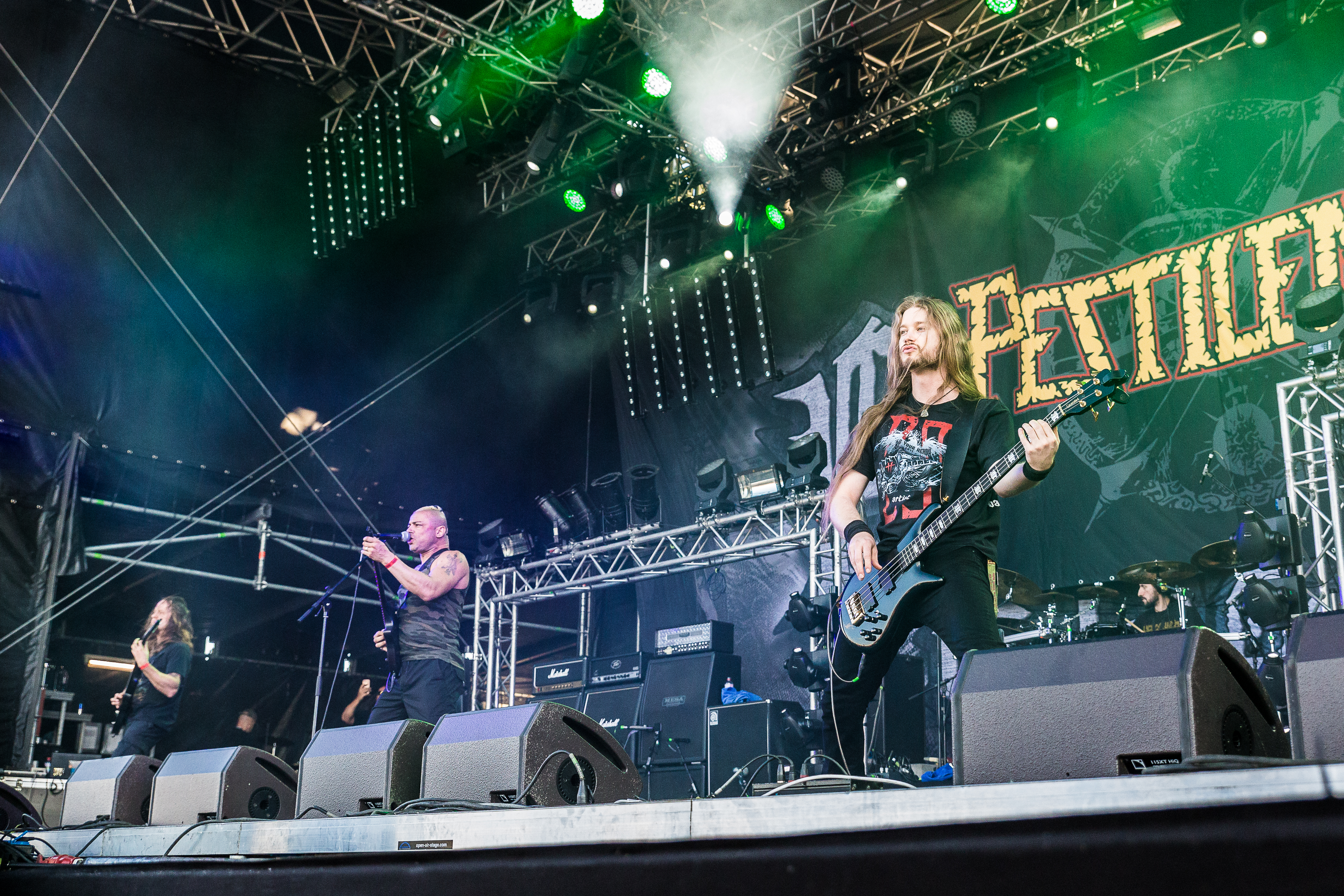
Pestilence at Party.San Metal Open Air 2018

On 24 September 2018, Tilen Hudrap announced that he is leaving Pestilence in order to join U.D.O. Edward Negrea of Necrovile was announced as replacement. The band also announced that new music, touring and festival appearances were planned for 2019.

On 1 August 2019, Pestilence announced that they had signed to Agonia Records and would release their then-upcoming ninth studio album Exitivm in the coming months. Several months later, Pestilence announced that Septimiu Hărşan had to leave the band due to restrictions caused by the COVID-19 pandemic; he was replaced by Michiel van der Plicht (God Dethroned and Carach Angren). After a two-year delay, Exitivm was released on 25 June 2021.

In March 2022, Pestilence announced on their Facebook page that they had finished eight songs for their upcoming tenth studio album Portals, with four more tracks to be completed. In July 2023, it was announced that Pestilence had replaced Joost van der Graaf with Roel Käller as their bassist, and were planning to release their new album later in the year or in 2024. However, there were no signs of Portals, nor any announcements from the band until September 2024, when it was reported that they were working on the album and that it would be released in 2025.

On February 22, 2024, Pestilence announced they would release Levels of Perception, a "best-of" album of re-recorded songs, on April 26. Shortly after the announcement, the original cover art for the album was replaced with a new cover showing the band members, due to backlash from fans over the original cover having been made using artificial intelligence (AI). This was the second controversy centered around one of Pestilence's cover artworks, following the original cover art for the band's 2018 album Hadeon, made by Santiago Francisco Jaramillo, which was nixed in 2017 after it was pointed out to have been plagiarized from several different sources.

On January 15, 2025, Pestilence announced that guitarist Rutger van Noordenburg had left the band. By November of that year, bassist Roel Käller had left Pestilence and was replaced by Dario Rudić.

On August 7, 2026, Pestilence announced that bassist Dario Rudić had left the band due to "personal reasons" - and that the group is looking for a new bass player.

== Style ==
Pestilence's approach to death metal is considered to be innovative. The influences of Slayer, Celtic Frost, Venom and Possessed have been observed in the band's music.

== Members ==
Current members

- Patrick Mameli — guitars (1986–1994, 2008–2014, 2016–present), vocals (1986–1987, 1990–1994, 2008–2014, 2016–present)
- Michiel van der Plicht — drums (2020–present)
- Max Blok — guitars (2025–present)

Former members

- Randy Meinhard — guitars (1986–1988)
- Chuck Colli — bass, vocals (1986)
- Marco Foddis — drums (1986–1988, 1989–1994)
- Gerrit Ulrich — bass (1986)
- Martin van Drunen — bass, vocals (1987–1990)
- Patrick Uterwijk — guitars (1988–1994, 2008–2014)
- Sebastian Dooijes — bass (1988–1989)
- Nick Sagias — bass (1990–1991)
- Tony Choy — bass (1991–1992, 2008–2009, 2016–2017)
- Jack Dodd — bass (1992)
- Jeroen Paul Thesseling — bass (1992–1994, 2009–2012)
- Peter Wildoer — drums (2008–2009)
- Yuma van Eekelen — drums (2009–2012)
- Stephan Fimmers — bass (2012–2013)
- Tim Yeung — drums (2012)
- Dave Haley — drums (2012–2014)
- Georg Maier — bass (2013–2014)
- Septimiu Hărşan — drums (2016–2020)
- Santiago Dobles — guitars (2016–2017)
- Alan Goldstein — bass (2017)
- Tilen Hudrap — bass (2017–2018)
- Calin Paraschiv — guitars (2017–2019)
- Edward Negrea — bass (2018–2019)
- Rutger van Noordenburg — guitars (2019–2025)
- Joost van der Graaf — bass (2019–2023)
- Roel Käller — bass (2023–2025)
- Dario Rudić — bass (2025–2026)

== Discography ==
=== Studio albums ===
- Malleus Maleficarum (1988)
- Consuming Impulse (1989)
- Testimony of the Ancients (1991)
- Spheres (1993)
- Resurrection Macabre (2009)
- Doctrine (2011)
- Obsideo (2013)
- Hadeon (2018)
- Exitivm (2021)
- Portals (2026)

=== Demos ===
- Dysentery (1987)
- The Penance (1987)

=== Compilations ===
- Mind Reflections (1994)
- Levels of Perception (re-recording album) (2024)

=== Live albums ===
- Chronicles of the Scourge (2006)
- Presence of the Past (2015)
- Presence of the Pest (2016)
