= Legacy of Disorder =

Heavy metal band

- Origin: Nelson, New Zealand
- Genres: Heavy metal, Thrash metal
- Years active: 2006–present
- Label: Black Orchard
- Members: James Robinson; Rana Freilich; Jase Keill; Matt Thompson
- Website: www.legacyofdisorder.com

Legacy of Disorder is a heavy metal band formed in 2006 in Auckland, New Zealand.

== History ==
Legacy of Disorder originate from New Zealand, where lead guitarist Rana Freilich met bassist Jason Keill, forming the band with drummer 'Hellman'. Vocalist James Robinson was recruited serendipitously after stopping on his way home to listen to the band practising in a storage king locker and impressing them with his vocal ability. Not long after, the band began shaping their own sound - a collaborative effort bringing together all the band members musical tastes. Matt Thompson later joined the band just prior to recording their début album, replacing 'Hellman'.

In 2009, the band recorded their first studio album Legacy of Disorder in Texas with music engineer and producer Sterling Winfield who worked with three American heavy metal bands (Pantera, Damageplan and Hellyeah). Later that year, the band obtained some notoriety for being banned from the Wellington Sevens for not being "mainstream" enough in relation to the heaviness of their music.

Following the release of their 2012 second studio album Last Man Standing, the band embarked on an extensive tour of North America with metal heavyweights Gwar, DevilDriver and Cancer Bats.

== Members ==
=== Current members ===
- James Robinson – lead vocals (since 2006)
- Rana Freilich – electric guitar (since 2006)
- Jase Keill – electric bass guitar (since 2006)
- Matt Thompson – drum kit (since 2007 – also of King Diamond)

=== Former members ===
- Hellman – drum kit (2006–2007)

== Discography ==
=== Studio albums ===
- Legacy of Disorder (2009)
- Last Man Standing (2012)
