= Spheres (Pestilence album) =

Studio album by Pestilence
- Released: 3 May 1993
- Recorded: January 1993
- Genre: Progressive death metal; jazz fusion
- Length: 33:17
- Label: Roadrunner
- Producer: Steve Fontano; Patrick Mameli

Pestilence chronology
Testimony of the Ancients (1991)	Spheres (1993)	Mind Reflections (1994)

Professional ratings
Review scores
Source	Rating
Allmusic	3/5 stars

Spheres is the fourth album by Dutch death metal band Pestilence, released in 1993. It was their final album before a 14-year hiatus from 1994 to 2008. On this album, the band experimented with a more progressive sound, utilizing guitar synthesizers as well as some jazz influences.

Decibel rated it positively, appreciating the "ear-candy at every turn" and the superb basswork. However, the quality of the drums work by Marco Foddis was criticised as unsuited to the range of styles present in the album. In the hiatus before 2008 Mameli started to criticise his own album.

== Track listing ==
All lyrics are written by Marco Foddis.

No.	Title	Music	Length
1.	"Mind Reflections"	Patrick Mameli, Patrick Uterwijk	3:21
2.	"Multiple Beings"	Mameli, Uterwijk	4:05
3.	"The Level of Perception"	Mameli, Uterwijk	3:49
4.	"Aurian Eyes" (instrumental)	Mameli	1:32
5.	"Soul Search"	Mameli	3:19
6.	"Personal Energy"	Mameli	4:09
7.	"Voices from Within" (instrumental)	Uterwijk	1:12
8.	"Spheres"	Mameli, Uterwijk	3:29
9.	"Changing Perspectives"	Mameli, Uterwijk	3:24
10.	"Phileas" (instrumental)	Jeroen Paul Thesseling	1:17
11.	"Demise of Time"	Mameli	3:40
Total length:			33:17

== Credits ==
- Patrick Mameli - guitar, synth guitar, vocals
- Patrick Uterwijk - guitar, synth guitar
- Jeroen Paul Thesseling - bass
- Marco Foddis - drums
