= Consuming Impulse =

Studio album by Pestilence
- Released: 25 December 1989; 9 January 1990 (Europe)
- Recorded: 1989 at Music Lab Berlin
- Genre: Death metal
- Length: 37:23
- Label: Roadrunner
- Producer: Harris Johns

Pestilence chronology
| Malleus Maleficarum (1988) | Consuming Impulse (1989) | Testimony of the Ancients (1991) |

Professional ratings
Review scores
| Source | Rating |
|---|---|
| AllMusic | 4.5/5 stars |

Consuming Impulse (stylized as Consvming Impvlse) is the second album by Dutch death metal band Pestilence, released in 1989. It was their first release with then-new guitarist Patrick Uterwijk, their last one to feature vocalist/live bassist Martin van Drunen and the last one to have Patrick Mameli recording bass.

The album was reissued along with Testimony of the Ancients on Roadrunner Records' Two from the Vault series. Decibel gave positive reviews to it as a cult classic.

The track "Out of the Body" is considered a fan favorite.

== Music ==
The sound on Consuming Impulse has been compared to the early work of Death. The album's instrumentation draws influence from Slayer, and contains what is described as "frantic, atonal, and noisy soloing." The album's "doomy" sections have drawn comparisons to Celtic Frost.

== Artwork ==
Decibel called the album's cover artwork "tacky". It is considered to be an iconic death metal album cover.

== Reception and legacy ==
John Serba of AllMusic gave the album 4 and a half stars out of five. He wrote: "Consuming Impulse stands firmly next to Death's Leprosy, Sepultura's Beneath the Remains, Obituary's Slowly We Rot, and Morbid Angel's Altars of Madness as key evolutionary albums in the legitimization of death metal in the late '80s. [...] Consuming Impulse is the guts of Pestilence's career, the group confidently leaping from the gutter with teeth bared, ready to stand toe-to-toe with the other truly great -- and more appreciated -- acts in the death metal genre."

Decibel said the album "melted minds and liquefied brains" and stated that the album "was, in fact, a game-changer" in the genre.

== Track listing ==
All music is composed by Patrick Mameli, except where noted.

| No. | Title | Lyrics | Music | Length |
|---|---|---|---|---|
| 1. | "Dehydrated" | Martin van Drunen | | 3:08 |
| 2. | "The Process of Suffocation" | van Drunen | Mameli, Patrick Uterwijk | 2:41 |
| 3. | "Suspended Animation" | van Drunen | Mameli, Uterwijk | 3:28 |
| 4. | "The Trauma" | Marco Foddis | | 3:20 |
| 5. | "Chronic Infection" | Foddis | | 3:57 |
| 6. | "Out of the Body" | Foddis | | 4:39 |
| 7. | "Echoes of Death" | Foddis | | 4:16 |
| 8. | "Deify Thy Master" | Foddis | Mameli, Uterwijk | 4:53 |
| 9. | "Proliferous Souls" (instrumental) | | | 2:08 |
| 10. | "Reduced to Ashes" | van Drunen | | 4:53 |
| Total length: | | | | 37:23 |

== Credits ==
- Patrick Mameli - guitar, bass
- Patrick Uterwijk - guitar
- Martin van Drunen - vocals, bass (Note: van Drunen was credited with playing bass, but did not perform the bass on the album, only live. Patrick Mameli performed bass on the album.)
- Marco Foddis - drums
