= Malleus Maleficarum (album) =

Studio album by Pestilence
- Released: 26 September 1988
- Genres: Thrash metal; death metal
- Length: 36:51
- Label: Roadrunner
- Producer: Kalle Trapp

Pestilence chronology
Malleus Maleficarum (1988)	Consuming Impulse (1989)

Professional ratings
Review scores
Source	Rating
Allmusic	2.5/5 stars

Malleus Maleficarum (stylized as Mallevs Maleficarvm) is the debut studio album by the Dutch death metal band Pestilence, released in 1988. Although the sound of this album is technically death metal, its direction is notably different from the band's subsequent work, leaning more towards the thrash metal genre with punk influences, known as crossover thrash. This is the only Pestilence album to include guitarist Randy Meinhard, who was replaced by Patrick Uterwijk prior to the making of their next album Consuming Impulse (1989).

== Track listing ==
No.	Title	Length
1.	"Malleus Maleficarum/Antropomorphia"	4:12
2.	"Parricide"	3:47
3.	"Subordinate to the Domination"	4:17
4.	"Extreme Unction"	1:29
5.	"Commandments"	5:17
6.	"Chemo Therapy"	4:48
7.	"Bacterial Surgery"	5:04
8.	"Cycle of Existence"	3:17
9.	"Osculum Infame"	1:52
10.	"Systematic Instruction"	4:08
Total length:		36:51

== Bonus tracks ==
The album was re-issued in 1998 on Displeased Records with two earlier demos as bonus tracks:

=== Demo 1 Dysentery 87 ===
11. "Against the Innocent"
12. "Delirical Life"
13. "Traitor's Gate"
14. "Throne of Death"

=== Demo 2 Penance 88 ===
15. "Into Hades (Intro)"
16. "Before the Penance"
17. "Affectation"
18. "Fight the Plague"

== Personnel ==
=== Pestilence ===
- Martin van Drunen – vocals, bass (Note: van Drunen was credited with playing bass, but did not perform the bass on the album, only live. Patrick Mameli performed bass on the album.)
- Patrick Mameli – guitar, bass
- Randy Meinhard – guitar
- Marco Foddis – drums

=== Additional credits ===
- Kalle Trapp – synthesizer on track "Osculum Infame"; producer
