= Patrick Mameli =

Dutch death metal singer and guitarist

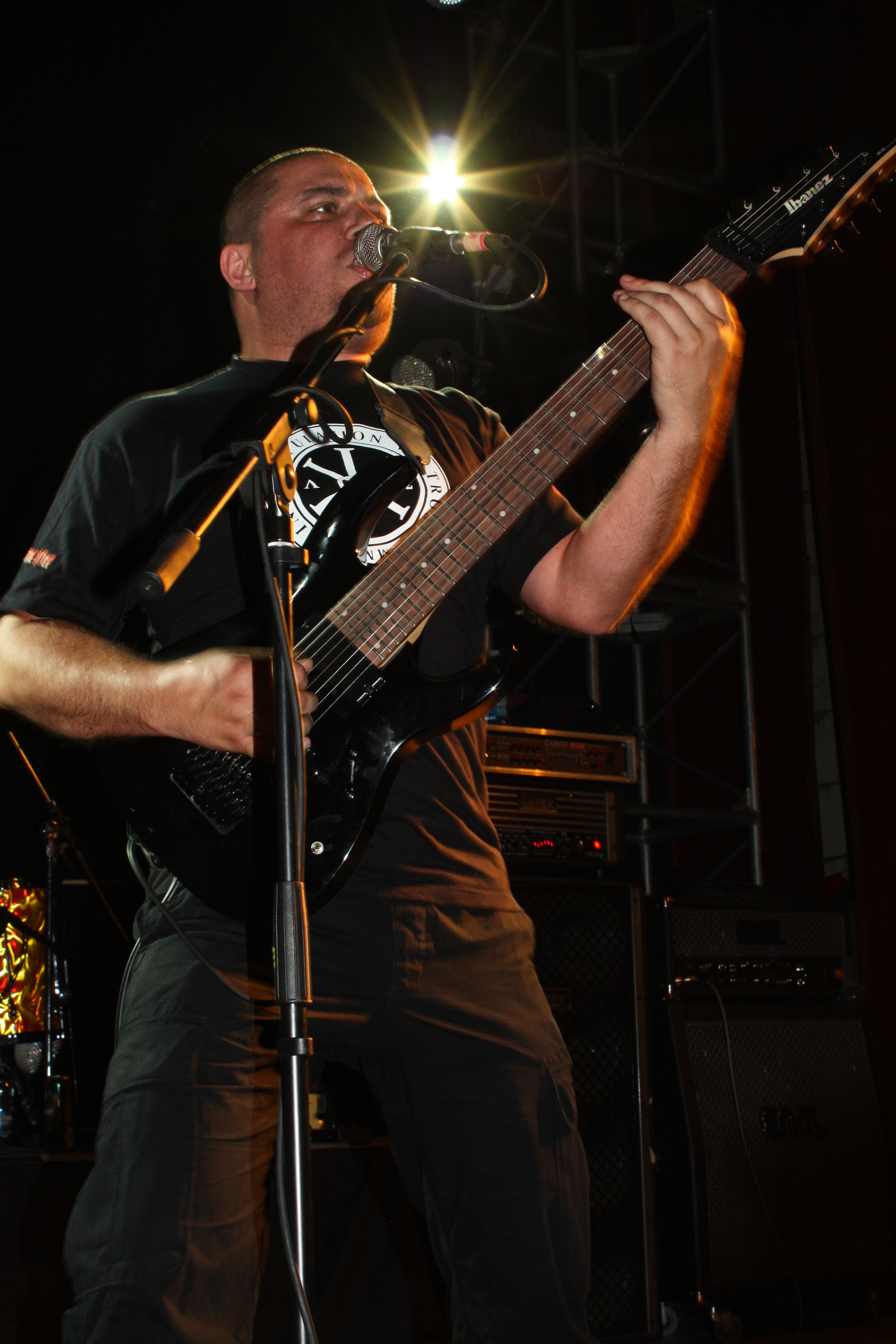
- Mameli performing in 2011

Background information
- Born: 23 November 1966 (age 59)
- Origin: Enschede, Netherlands
- Genres: Death metal, thrash metal, technical death metal, progressive metal, jazz fusion, avant-garde metal
- Occupations: Musician, songwriter
- Instruments: Vocals, guitar
- Years active: 1986–present
- Labels: Mascot Records, Roadrunner Records
- Member of: Pestilence

Patrizio Marco Giovanni "Patrick" Mameli (born 23 November 1966) is a Dutch musician who is the founder, lead singer, guitarist and only original remaining member of the technical death metal band Pestilence, which he formed in 1986. Mameli remains the creative force behind Pestilence, as well as the primary songwriter.

After eight years and four albums, Pestilence disbanded in 1994, but reunited in 2008, and released three more albums before going on hiatus from 2014 to 2016. After Pestilence's break up, Mameli resurfaced in the Dutch groove metal supergroup C-187 with Cynic drummer Sean Reinert and bassist Tony Choy (formerly in Pestilence), resulting in 2007's Collision, which was met with poor reviews. After disbanding C-187, Mameli created 2 more bands: Moordzucht and Neuromorph. In 2018, Mameli toured again with Pestilence with no original members, joined by Slovenian bassist Tilen Hudrap, who played in the bands U.D.O, Testament, Doro, Vicious Rumors, and Paradox. Mameli found in his own words “the best drummer ever in Pestilence”, Septimiu Harsan, known for his versatility and technical abilities. The touring lineup was rounded up by Calin Paraschiv (from Necrovile).
