= Flight 471 =

Flight 471 may refer to the following accidents and incidents involving commercial airliners:

- Japan Airlines Flight 471, which crashed near Delhi Airport on 14 June 1972, resulting in 85 fatalities.
- UTair Flight 471, which crash-landed on 17 March 2007 at Kurumoch International Airport, resulting in six fatalities.
- Air Gabon Flight 471, which overran the runway at Libreville International Airport on 19 December 2003, with no fatalities.
