= Konstantin Koroteyev =

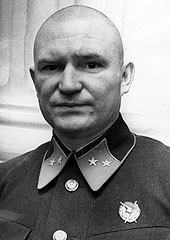
- Koroteyev in 1943
- Born: 25 February 1901; Shcheglovka, Bogodukhovsky Uyezd, Kharkov Governorate, Russian Empire
- Died: 4 January 1953 (aged 51); Moscow, Soviet Union
- Burial place: Novodevichy Cemetery
- Military career
- Allegiance: Soviet Union (1918–1953)
- Service years: 1918–1953
- Rank: Colonel General
- Commands: 12th Army, 9th Army, 18th Army, 37th Army, 52nd Army; Transbaikal Military District; North Caucasus Military District
- Conflicts: World War I; Russian Civil War; World War II; Soviet invasion of Poland; Eastern Front; Battle of the Caucasus; Battle of the Dnieper; Battle of the Korsun–Cherkassy Pocket; Uman–Botoşani Offensive; Second Jassy–Kishinev Offensive; Vistula–Oder Offensive; Lower Silesian Offensive; Battle of Berlin; Prague Offensive
- Awards: Hero of the Soviet Union

Konstantin Apollonovich Koroteyev (Russian: Константи́н Аполло́нович Короте́ев; 25 February [O.S. 12 February] 1901–4 January 1953) was a Soviet Army colonel general and a Hero of the Soviet Union.

== Early life and World War I ==
Koroteyev was born on 25 February 1901 in the village of Shcheglovka (now in Bogodukhov) in Kharkov Governorate, then part of the Russian Empire, to a working-class family. He graduated from primary school and worked as a laborer at the Shcheglovka mine. Koroteyev volunteered for the Imperial Russian Army in August 1916 during World War I and was sent to the Southwestern Front as a ryadovoy. He became a grenadier in the 290th Lipetsk Infantry Regiment, serving until the Imperial Army collapsed following the Russian Revolution in December 1917. Koroteyev returned home and became a laborer at the mine again.

== Russian Civil War ==
In February 1918, Koroteyev joined a Red Guard detachment formed from Shcheglovka mine workers during the Russian Civil War. After completing its formation, the detachment was reorganized as the 1st Lugansk Battalion, and Koroteyev was elected commander of its 2nd Company. In April, the battalion became part of Kliment Voroshilov's 2nd Ukrainian Soviet Army, participating in the defense of Lugansk and in battles against German troops on the Southern Front. He then fought in the suppression of a Don Cossack uprising and the retreat to Tsaritsyn. In June, the 1st Communist Rifle Division was formed there, and Koroteyev became a platoon commander in its 2nd Communist Regiment.

After the Red Army's retreat from Tsaritsyn, Koroteyev was sent to study at the Saratov Infantry and Machine Gun Courses in September 1919. As part of a cadet detachment, he helped suppress the Sapozhkov Uprising in the Ural steppes before graduating in July 1920.

He participated in battles with the White movement near Lugansk, Millerovo, Belaya Kalitva and Tsaritsyn (later Stalingrad, now Volgograd).

== Interwar period ==
In July 1920, Koroteyev was appointed a platoon commander in the 4th Reserve Regiment, stationed in Roslavl. He was transferred to become a platoon commander in the 4th Rifle Division's 31st Rifle Regiment in January 1921, and in June of the same year transferred to the 11th Rifle Regiment. Koroteyev graduated from the Western Front's courses for midlevel commanders in Smolensk in July 1924, serving successively as an assistant company commander, company commander, and rifle battalion commander. In October 1926, he graduated from the Vystrel commanders' improvement courses.

Koroteyev was appointed chief of staff of the 14th Rifle Regiment in January 1934 before becoming regimental commander in March 1935. He was appointed chief of staff of the 27th Rifle Division, part of the Belorussian Military District's 4th Rifle Corps, in July 1937, and became division commander in February 1938. In the same year, he joined the Communist Party of the Soviet Union. Koroteyev led the 27th Division in the Soviet invasion of Poland in September 1939, during which it advanced into Polish territory annexed to the Soviet Union as western Belorussia.

During the Winter War he was a division commander. Koroteyev commanded the left-flank group of the 15th Army of the North-Western Front and led the fighting on the mastery of the islands, Petäjäsaari and Maksimansaari in Lake Ladoga.

In March 1940, he was appointed inspector of the infantry of the Leningrad Military District before taking command of the Kiev Special Military District's 55th Rifle Corps in March 1941, which he commanded at the beginning of Operation Barbarossa, the German invasion of the Soviet Union, on 22 June.

== World War II ==
=== The rout of the 37th Army ===
From the beginning of the invasion, Koroteyev led the corps in the border battles as part of the Southwestern Front. In July, it fought in fierce fighting in defense of the Dniester line as part of the Southern Front's 18th Army, but was forced to retreat beyond the Southern Bug by Axis troops. In August the corps was disbanded, and he was made deputy commander of the 18th Army for the rear.

=== Southern Front ===
In October 1941 he was appointed commander of the front's 12th Army, after it failed to hold Dnepropetrovsk and the defensive line on the Dnieper. Koroteyev led the army in the battles in the Donbass region and Rostov defensive operation. The compounds of the enemy army has suffered heavy losses, but under the pressure numerically superior enemy Donbass had to leave. Successfully operated commander in his first major offensive near Rostov in November - December 1941. He led it in the defense of Rostov and a counteroffensive against German troops during the Battle of Rostov.

In March 1942, Koroteyev was made assistant commander of the Southern Font. In August, he took command of the 11th Guards Rifle Corps, part of the Transcaucasian Front's 9th Army, leading it in the defense of positions in the direction of Ordzhonikidze.

=== Transcaucasian Front ===
In early September 1942, Koroteyev was appointed commander of the 9th Army, leading it in the Battle of the Caucasus. Under his command, the fall of 1942, the army waged a fierce and bloody battles on the defensive line Malgobek - Mozdok - Elkhotovo, and did not allow the enemy to Grozny and Baku oil.

January 1, 1943, the 9th Army Major General Koroteyev went on the offensive, pursuing the "running away" from the Caucasus enemy. In January, the 9th Army liberated Elkhotovo, Cool, Pyatigorsk, Nevinnomyssk and Armavir. Koroteyev brought the 9th Army to the city Slavyansk-on-Kuban.

In February, he transferred to command the 18th Army, returning to command of the 9th Army in March.

On 13 May 1943, Koroteyev was appointed commander of the 37th Army of the North Caucasian Front, which under his leadership was trying to break the "Blue Line" Hitler's defense on the Taman peninsula.

=== At the head of the 52nd Army ===
In July 1943, Koroteyev was appointed commander of the 52nd Army, which he led for the rest of the war. Under his command, the army served as part of the Reserve of the Supreme High Command, the Voronezh Front, the Steppe Front (2nd Ukrainian Front from 20 October), and the 1st Ukrainian Front. He led the army in the Battle of the Dnieper, the Korsun–Shevchenkovsky Offensive, the Uman–Botoșani Offensive, the Second Jassy–Kishinev Offensive, the Vistula–Oder Offensive, the Lower Silesian Offensive, the Battle of Berlin, and the Prague Offensive. For his "skilled leadership" of the army in the crossing of the Oder during the Vistula–Oder Offensive, Koroteyev was made a Hero of the Soviet Union on 6 April 1945.

Passing fought over 250 kilometers on the left-bank Ukraine, in November 1943, the 52nd Army crossed the Dnieper near the city of Cherkassy, a foothold. After long heavy fighting December 14, 1943, Army Corps was released this regional center of Ukraine.

In January–February 1944, the 9th Army of the 2nd Ukrainian Front took part in the Korsun-Shevchenko Operation. As a result, the army out in a large area of the city Zvenigorodka Nazi group was in the "pot".

In March 1944, the army of General Koroteyev well in Uman-Botoshanskoy operations, participated in the liberation of the city of Uman, March 11, Department of the Army crossed the Southern Bug River, near the village Dzhulinka Vinnitsa region and seized a bridgehead. Then they crossed the Dniester, and passing through the territory of Moldova, in mid-April reached the approaches to the Romanian city of Iasi.

August 20, 1944, began the Iasi-Kishinev operation of Soviet troops. Colonel General Koroteyev and his 52nd Army broke through enemy defenses and captured the city of Iasi, and by August 24 came to settlements Khushi - Leovo, where she met with the 57th Army of the 3rd Ukrainian Front. In the next "pot" in Chisinau were compound 5 and the German army corps! By September 4, 1944, Nazi group was dissolved, part of the army captured 65,000 soldiers and officers, about 1,000 guns, many other military equipments.

In September 1944, the 52nd Army was put in reserve rates, and in December - transferred to the 1st Ukrainian Front, and focused on the Sandomierz bridgehead.

January 12, 1945, he went on the offensive, taking part in the Vistula-Oder operation. General sent Koroteyev main striking force, with battles overcame the enemy defenses on the River Warta, in the Polish city of Czestochowa, which was released on 17 January 1945. After 2 days, the troops of the 52nd Army approached the city Glogau and the run crossed in the city Oder, capturing a bridgehead on the west bank.

In February 1945, the 52nd Army participated in the Lower-Silesian operations. Enemy defenses, the army Koroteyeva to February 24, 1945, went to the line of the river Neisse. As a result, in the fortress city of Breslau (Wroclaw, Poland) was surrounded garrison in 40000 soldiers.

He participated in the Berlin operation. In May 1945, K.A.Koroteyev commanded the army in the last offensive of World War II. After Berlin fell in Czechoslovakia powerful group Nazis refused to capitulate. May 6, 1945, the 52nd Army went on the offensive, and May 8, its troops had been released Goerlitz, May 9 - Liberec. Only 11 May 1945 the war was over for Colonel General K.A.Koroteyev in Mlada Boleslav (the Czech town north-east of Prague).

== Postwar ==
Postwar, Koroteyev remained in command of the 52nd Army, graduating from Higher Academic Courses at the General Staff Academy in 1947. In the same year he was appointed as a commander of the Transbaikal Military District, holding the post until March 1951. He then became assistant commander of the North Caucasus Military District. Koroteyev died on 4 January 1953 in Moscow.

Since 1951 - the assistant commander of the North Caucasus Military District.

Since 1950 Konstantin Koroteyev was a deputy of the Supreme Soviet.

== Awards and decorations ==
- Hero of the Soviet Union (April 6, 1945)
- Three Order of Lenin
- Four Order of the Red Banner
- Order of Suvorov 1st class
- Order of Bogdan Khmelnitsky, 1st class
