= UTair =

UTair may refer to:

- UTair Aviation, a Russian airline
  - UTair-Ukraine, a Ukrainian subsidiary of UTair Aviation
- UTair Cargo, a Russian cargo airline based in Plekhanov, Tyumen
- UTair Express, a Russian regional airline
