= 2018 Utair Mil Mi-8 crash =

2018 aviation accident in Russia

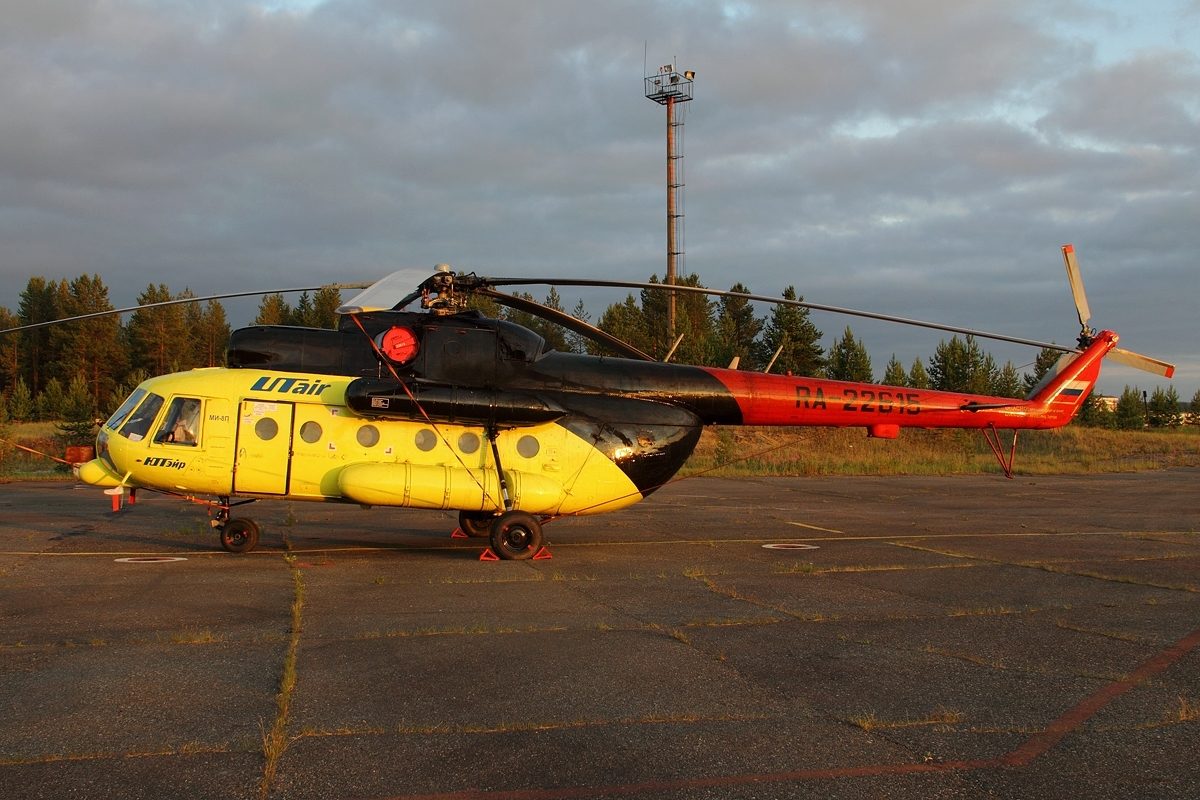
- An Utair Mil Mi-8, similar to the one involved

Accident
- Date: 4 August 2018
- Summary: Crashed after mid-air collision
- Site: Igarka, Krasnoyarsk Krai, Russia

Aircraft
- Aircraft type: Mil Mi-8AMT
- Operator: Utair
- Registration: RA-25640
- Flight origin: Vankor Field, Krasnoyarsk Krai, Russia
- Destination: Tarko-Sale, Yamalo-Nenets Autonomous Okrug, Russia
- Occupants: 18
- Passengers: 15
- Crew: 3
- Fatalities: 18
- Survivors: 0

On 4 August, 2018, a Utair Mil Mi-8 helicopter crashed on takeoff from Vankor Field, Krasnoyarsk Krai, killing all 18 people on board. The aircraft was headed to Tarko-Sale, Yamalo-Nenets Autonomous Okrug, carrying oil workers of the company Rosneft. The crash of the helicopter was caused by the collision with the external load of another Mil Mi-8, which had taken off from another nearby helipad.

== Background ==
=== Aircraft ===
The aircraft involved was a Utair Mil Mi-8AMT helicopter registered as RA-25640 and manufactured in 2010.

=== Passengers and crew ===
There were fifteen passengers and three crew on board. All passengers on board were working for a subsidiary of the state oil company Rosneft.

== Accident ==
=== Flight ===
The aircraft took off from Vankor Field en route to Tarko-Sale in Yamalo-Nenets Autonomous Okrug. At 5:00 a.m., the helicopter collided with the external load of another Mil Mi-8, which had taken off from another nearby helipad, and crashed. After crashing, the helicopter caught fire and was destroyed. The second helicopter was undamaged and landed safely.

=== Rescue operations ===
Five emergency teams were sent to the crash site, and they took half an hour to put out the fire that broke out at the wreckage. Debris of the helicopter, especially of the tail section, were found over a large area, indicating a mid-air break up of the aircraft.

== Investigation ==
An accident investigation report was released by the Interstate Aviation Committee (MAK). In the report, MAK said the accident occurred due to a combination of the following factors:

- insufficient assessment of the level of risks associated with the possibility of aircraft collision in the air at the high intensity of air traffic at Vankor, its actual equipment and the order of air traffic organization on the part of both the airline and the aviation authorities and FSUE "State Corporation for Air Traffic Control";
- the absence of the Igarka Control Center Dispatcher's Work Technology, which defines the procedure for performing the duties of the PIO Dispatcher with respect to aircraft flying from Vankor, and, as a result, the dispatcher's failure to understand and fulfill their duties to timely transmit to the aircraft crews the information about the collision danger;
- malfunctioning of SPU-7 on Mi-8AMT RA-22427 helicopter, which in the circumstances of the emergency flight practically ruled out radio diligence of its crew;
- unsatisfactory radio surveillance by the crew of Mi-8AMT RA-25640;
- insufficient intelligibility and quality of VHF radio communication between the aircraft at Vankor station and the Igarka Control Center dispatcher, provided through a satellite repeater;
- passivity of the Igarka Control Center dispatcher when there are doubts about the correctness of the information received via radio communication;
- unsatisfactory situational awareness of the crews of both aircraft before and during takeoffs;
- actual mutual positioning of the aircraft (flight trajectories), which practically ruled out effective visual flight awareness.

== Aftermath ==
After this accident, and the crash of Flight 579 nearly a month later, Rosaviatsiya's director, Alexander Neradko, raised doubts about the safety of the operations of Utair, pressuring the airline to make changes, especially in the crew operations sector.
