= Flight 120 =

Flight 120 may refer to the following accidents involving commercial airliners:

- TAME Flight 120, crashed on 28 January 2002
- China Airlines Flight 120, caught fire and exploded after landing on 20 August 2007
- UTair Flight 120, crashed on 2 April 2012

== See also ==
- STS-120, a successful Space Shuttle mission in October–November 2007
