= Krasnokutsk Raion =

Former subdivision of Kharkiv Oblast, Ukraine

Krasnokutsk Raion Краснокутський район
- Raion
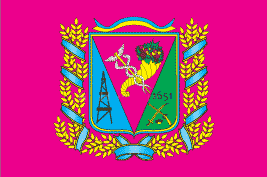
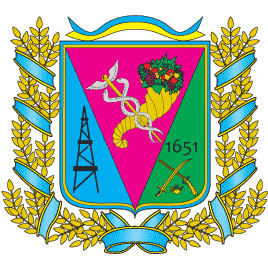
- Flag Coat of arms

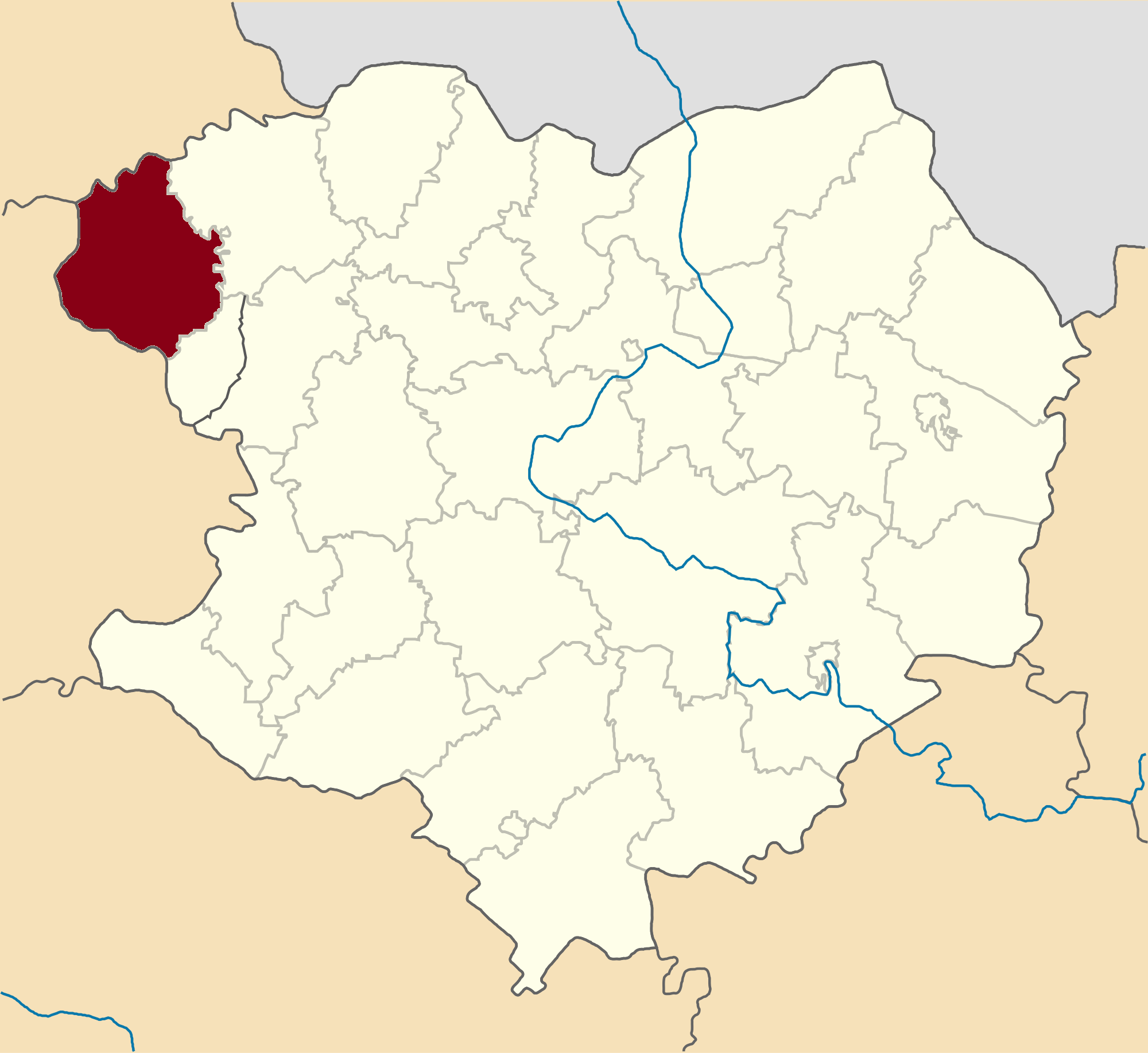
- Raion location in Kharkiv Oblast
- Coordinates: 50°2′11.4282″N 35°7′54.1524″E
- Country: Ukraine
- Oblast: Kharkiv Oblast
- Established: 1923
- Disestablished: 18 July 2020
- Admin. center: Krasnokutsk

Area
  - Total: 1,040.8 km^{2} (401.9 sq mi)

Population (2020)
  - Total: 26,907
  - Density: 25.852/km^{2} (66.957/sq mi)
- Time zone: UTC+2 (EET)
  - Summer (DST): UTC+3 (EEST)
- Website: http://krda.at.ua/

Krasnokutsk Raion (Ukrainian: Краснокутський район) was a raion (district) in Kharkiv Oblast of Ukraine. Its administrative center was the urban-type settlement of Krasnokutsk. The raion was established in 1923, when the new raion system of territorial subdivision replaced the Tsarist volost system.

== History ==
Upon creation, it was part of the Bohodukhiv Okruha, which changed its administrative center to Okhtyrka the same year and renamed it after Okhtyrka. In 1925, Okhtyrka Okruha was liquidated, and its raions were merged into the neighboring Kharkiv Okruha. In 1930, all okruhas in the Ukrainian SSR were liquidated, and until 1932, raions were the first tier of territorial subdivisions. In 1932, Krasnokutsk Raion became part of the newly created Kharkiv Oblast.

In 1942, during the Nazi-German occupation, Krasnokutsk Raion was planned to be converted into the Krasnokutsk Kreis within the Generalbezirk Charkow, but this was never realized.

The raion was abolished on 18 July 2020 as part of the administrative reform of Ukraine, which reduced the number of raions of Kharkiv Oblast to seven. The area of Krasnokutsk Raion was merged into Bohodukhiv Raion. The last estimate of the raion population was 26,907 (2020 est.)

At the time of disestablishment, the raion consisted of one hromada, Krasnokutsk settlement hromada with the administration in Krasnokutsk.

== Administrative division ==
- Settlement territorial councils (selyshchna rada): 2
  - Krasnokutsk settlement council
  - Kostiantynivka settlement council
- Village territorial councils (silrada): 11
  - Vyazova village council
  - Kaplunivka village council
  - Kachalivka village council
  - Kytchenkivka village council
  - Koziivka village council
  - Kolontayiv village council
  - Liubivka village council
  - Murafa village council
  - Oleksiivka village council
  - Parkhomivka village council
  - Riabokoneve village council

== Tourist attractions ==
- Krasnokutskyi arboretum
- Sloboda National Nature Park
- History and Art Museum (Podhorichany Palace), Parkhomivka
