= Parkhomivka, Kharkiv Oblast =

Rural locality in Kharkiv Oblast, Ukraine

Parkhomivka Пархомівка
- Location in Ukraine Parkhomivka (Kharkiv Oblast)
- Coordinates: 50°07′N 34°59′E
- Country: Ukraine
- Oblast: Kharkiv Oblast
- Raion: Bohodukhiv Raion
- Village founded: 1688

Area
  - Total: 10,716 km^{2} (4,137 sq mi)
- Elevation: 122 m (400 ft)

Population (2024)
  - Total: ▼2,685
  - Density: 343.32/km^{2} (889.2/sq mi)
- Time zone: UTC+2 (EET)
  - Summer (DST): UTC+3 (EEST)
- Postal code: 62015
- Area code: +380 5756

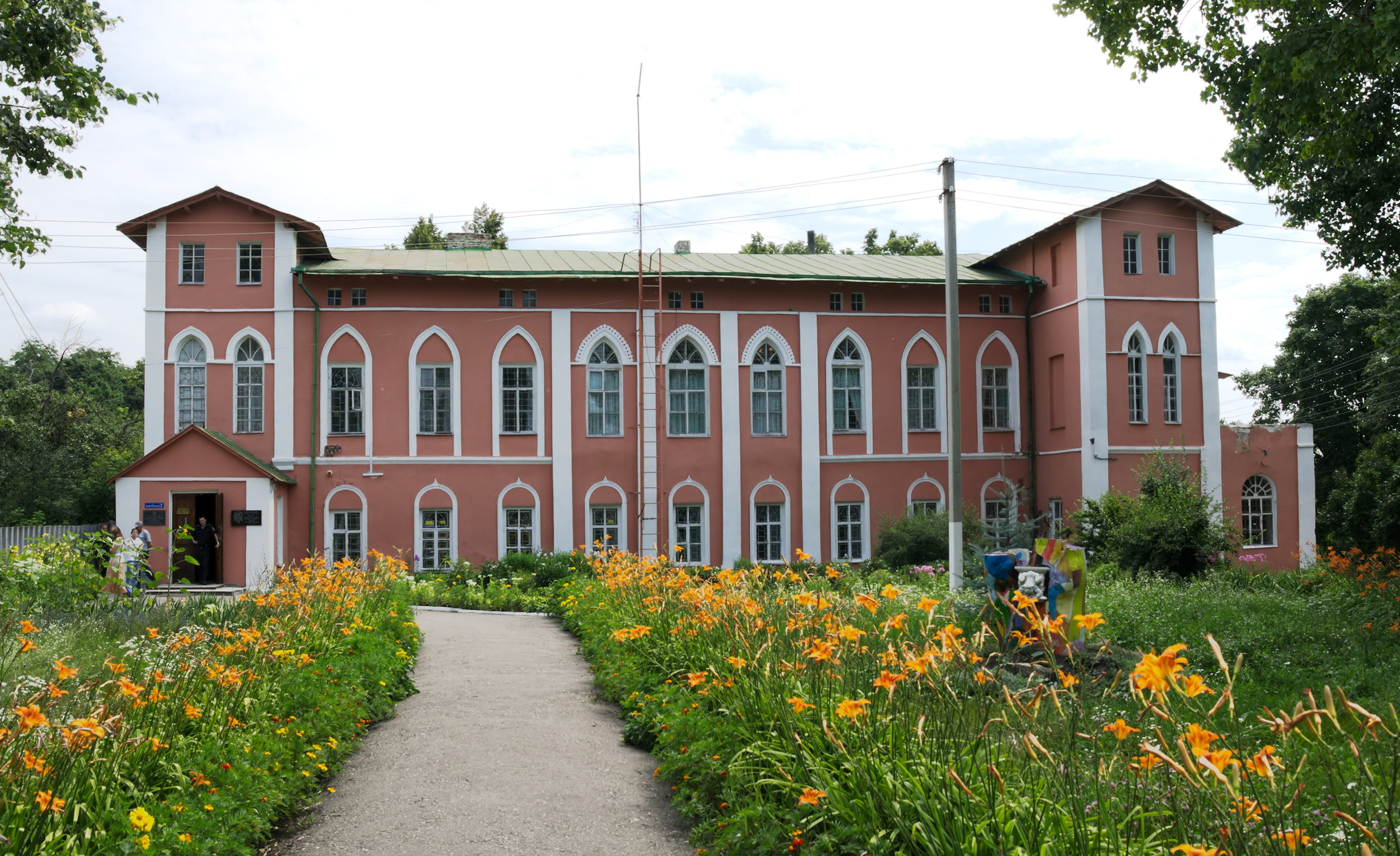
Pidhorychany Palace (now a museum), Parkhomivka

Parkhomivka (Ukrainian: Пархомівка) is a village in Bohodukhiv Raion, Kharkiv Oblast, Ukraine. It belongs to Krasnokutsk settlement hromada, one of the hromadas of Ukraine. The village has a population of 2,685.

Despite being a small village, the local art museum displays works by Pablo Picasso and other significant artists. The museum started as a project from a local schoolteacher, who (along with his students), wrote to artists and art collectors asking for sample works for the local students to learn from.

Until 18 July 2020, Parkhomivka belonged to Krasnokutsk Raion. The raion was abolished in July 2020 as part of the administrative reform of Ukraine, which reduced the number of raions of Kharkiv Oblast to seven. The area of Krasnokutsk Raion was merged into Bohodukhiv Raion.
