= Polet =

Polet may refer to:

== People ==
- Grégoire Polet (born 1978), French-speaking Belgian writer
- Martin Poleť, Slovak footballer
- Robert Polet, Dutch businessman
- Sybren Polet, Dutch writer and poet

== Sports ==
- FC Polet, Russian football club
- FK GSP Polet Dorćol, Serbian football club
- FK Polet 1926, Bosnian-Herzegovinian football club
- FK Polet Ljubić, Serbian football club
- FK Polet Nakovo, Serbian football club
- FK Polet Novi Karlovci, Serbian football club

== Other ==
- Polet Flight, a defunct Russian airline
- Polet, a commonly shortened name of Vinmonopolet, a Norwegian state-owned monopoly retailer of alcohol beverages
- Polet, a Thursday supplement of Slovenian newspaper, Delo
