= Utrenny Airport =

Airport in Tyumen, Russia

Utrenny Airport Утренний Аэропорт
- IATA: none; ICAO: USDM

Summary
- Location: Tazovsky District, Tyumen Oblast, Russia
- Elevation AMSL: −30 ft / −9 m
- Coordinates: 71°00′40″N 074°15′35″E

Map
- Shown within Russia

Runways
Direction	Length		Surface
Direction	m	ft	Surface
01/19	1,550	5,085	Concrete
- Sources: AIP Russia

Utrenny Airport (Russian: Утренний Аэропорт; ICAO: USDM) is an airport in the Tazovsky District, Tyumen Oblast, Russia. The airport serves Arctic LNG 2, a liquefied natural gas project run by Novatek, allowing for both personnel and cargo to be delivered to the project facilities by aircraft.

== Accidents and incidents ==
- On 19 October 2023, a Utair Antonov An-24 experienced a runway excursion during landing.
- On 14 June 2024, Utair Flight 9706, an Antonov An-26, crash-landed near the airport while attempting to land and broke in two, injuring 3 of the 41 occupants.
