= Bohodukhiv railway station =

Railway station in Bohodukhiv, Ukraine

Bohodukhiv Богодухів
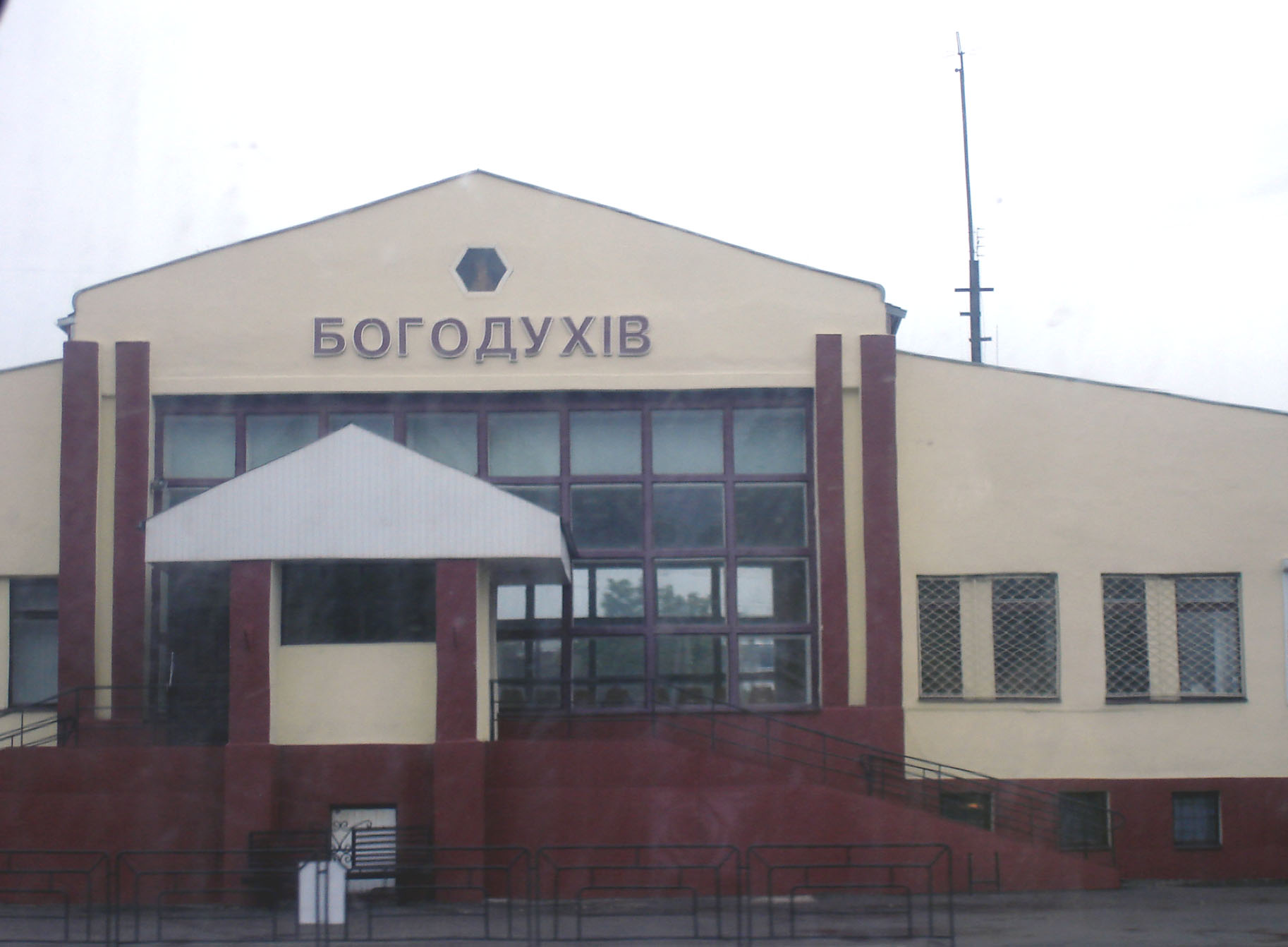

General information
- Location: Bohodukhiv, Ukraine
- Coordinates: 50.1567°N 35.4900°E
- System: Southern Railway terminal
- Owner: Ukrainian Railways

Construction
- Structure type: Standard (at-grade)
- Parking: Available

Other information
- Fare zone: Southern Ukrainian Railways

History
- Opened: 1878
- Former names: Southern Soviet Railways
Location

Bohodukhiv railway station (Ukrainian: залізнична станція Богодухів) is a railway station in Bohodukhiv, Ukraine.

== History ==
The railway station was built in 1878 in Bogodukhov, which was the administrative centre of Bogodukhov uyezd in Kharkov Governorate of the Russian Empire.

During World War II, in 1941 - 1943 the station was damaged as a result of Luftwaffe bombing, fighting, and German occupation. Later the station was completely restored and resumed its work.

After declaration of independence of Ukraine, the Bogodukhov railway station was renamed into Bohodukhiv railway station.

== Sources ==
- Архангельский А. С., Архангельский В. А. Железнодорожные станции СССР: Справочник. В 2-х кн. — М. : Транспорт, 1981.
