= Sloboda National Nature Park =

National park in Ukraine

- Ukrainian: Слобожанський національний природний парк (Also: Slobozhanskyi NNP)
- IUCN category II (national park)
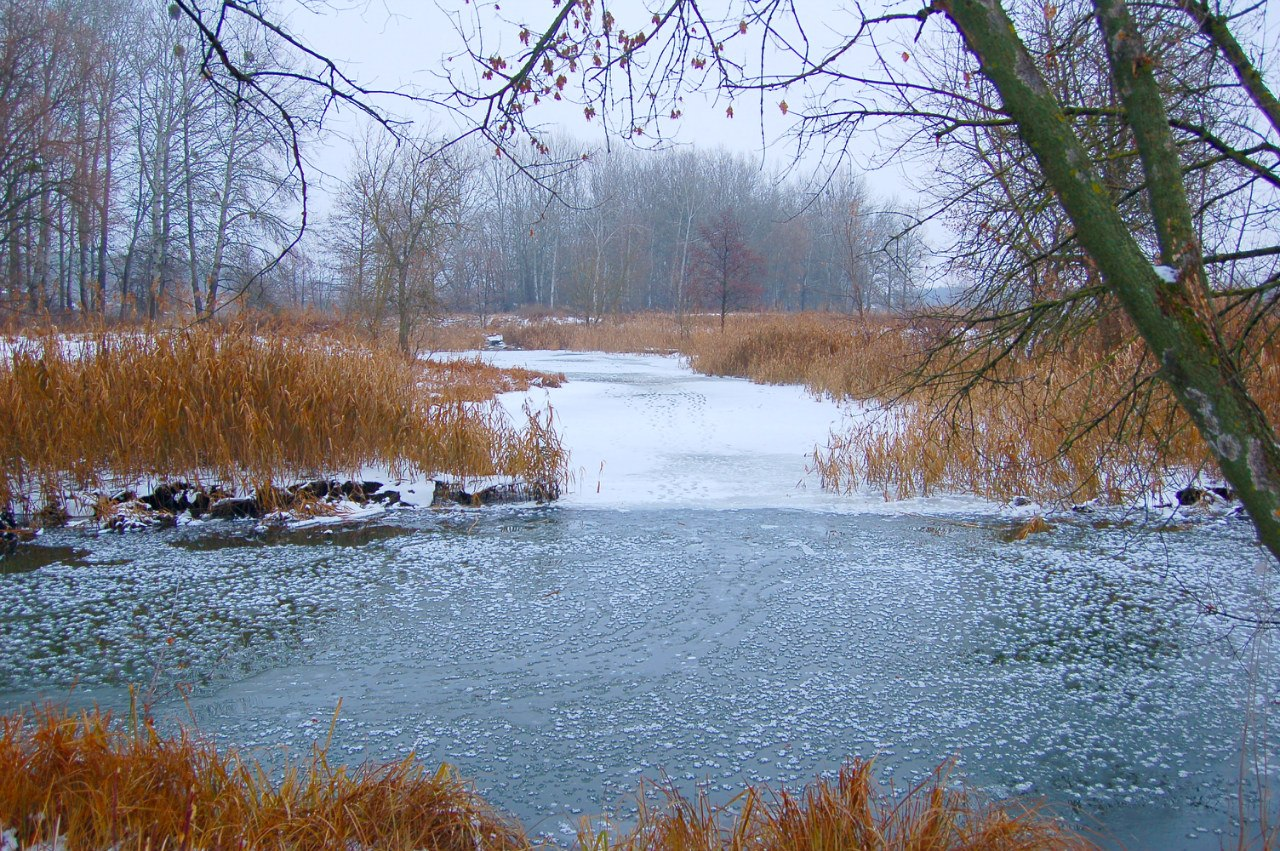
- Sloboda National Nature Park in Winter

- Location within Ukraine
- Location: Bohodukhiv Raion, Kharkiv Oblast
- Nearest city: Krasnokutsk
- Coordinates: 50°05′09″N 35°12′56″E
- Area: 5,244 hectares (12,958 acres; 52 km^{2}; 20 sq mi)
- Established: 2009
- Governing body: Ministry of Ecology and Natural Resources (Ukraine)
- Website: http://slobozhanskyi.in.ua/

The Sloboda National Nature Park (Ukrainian: Слобожанський національний природний парк, romanized: Slobozhanskyi NNP) is a national park of Ukraine that covers a forest-steppe region at the confluence of the Merla and Merchik Rivers in the East Poltava Highlands of eastern Ukraine. The park features an extensive complex of marshes, swamps, and other wetlands, forming rich habitat for diverse plants and animals. The park is administratively in Bohodukhiv Raion of Kharkiv Oblast.

== Topography ==
The valley of the Merla and Merchyk Rivers has a low terrace of floodplains, meadows, and marshes. The second terrace has hills and forest-steppe, with meadow-bog vegetation in the depressions.

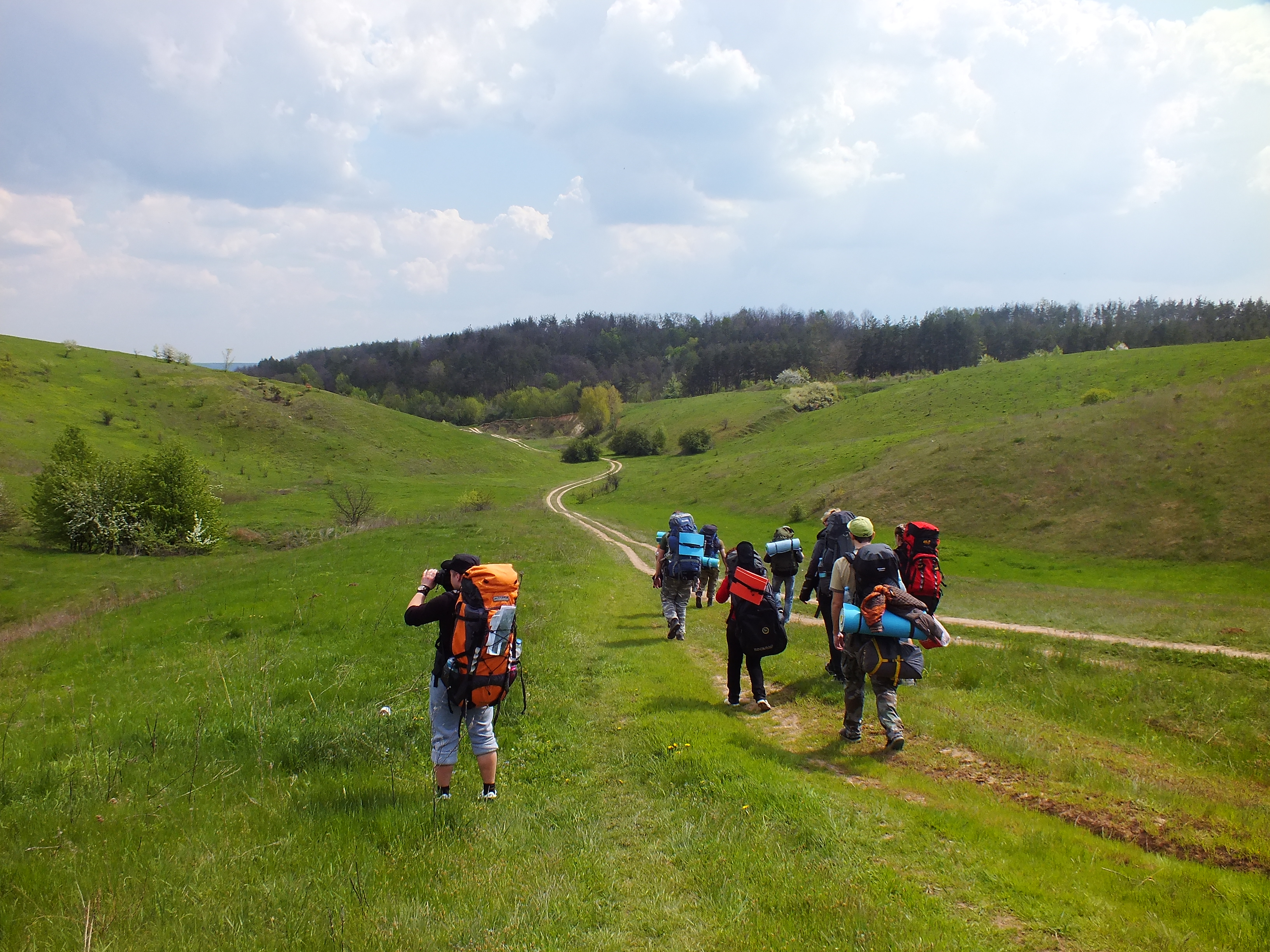
Backpacking, Sloboda NNP

== Climate and ecoregion ==
The climate of Sloboda is Humid continental climate, warm summer (Köppen climate classification (Dfb)). This climate is characterized by large seasonal temperature differentials and a warm summer (at least four months averaging over 10 °C (50 °F), but no month averaging over 22 °C (72 °F).

== Flora and fauna ==
More than 90% of the park's territory is forest. The right bank of the Merla River is a natural maple-lime forest; the left bank has natural and artificial pine plantations. The bog-forests are primarily alder and birch.

== Public use ==
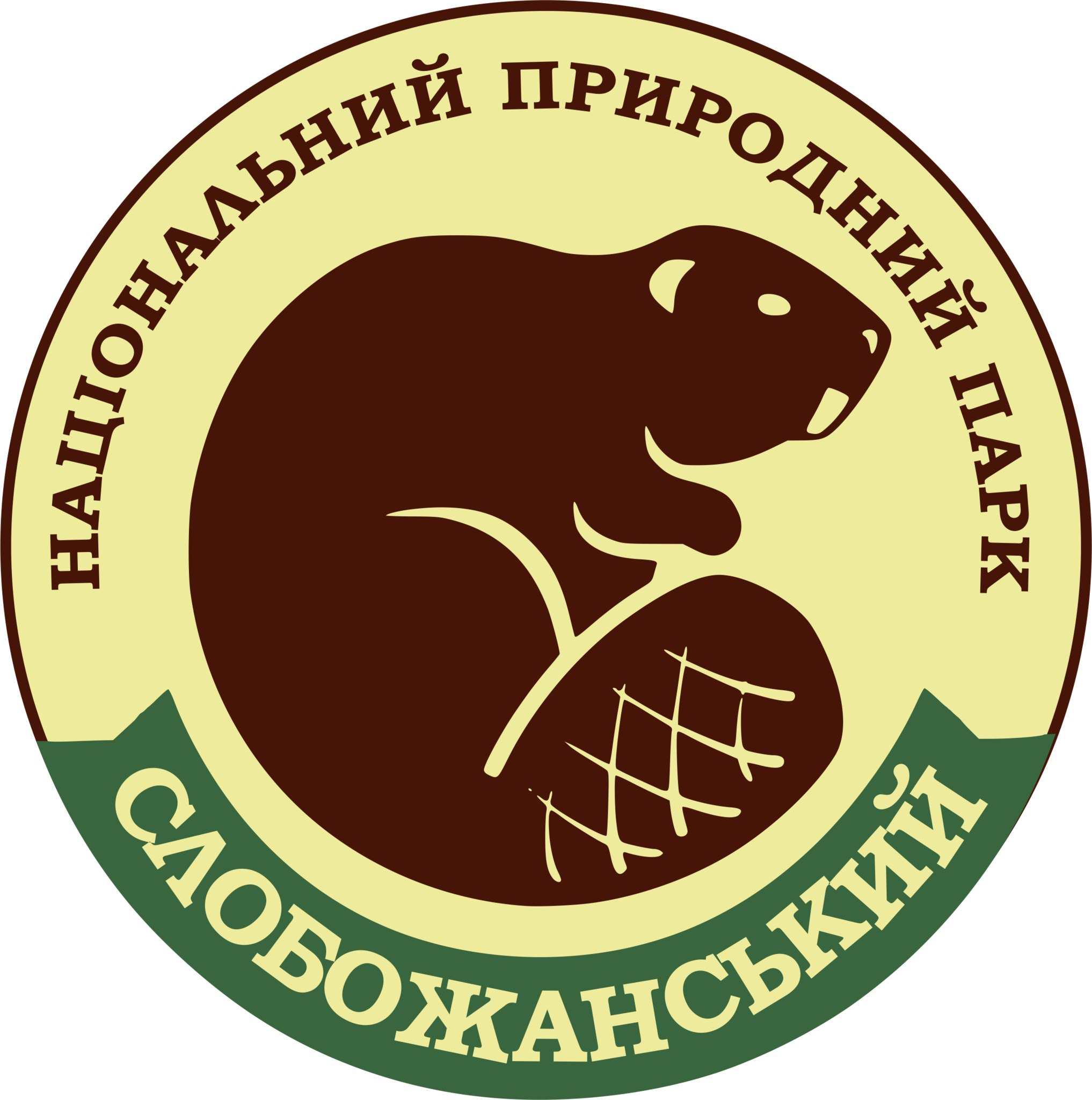
Park logo

To protect the natural environment within the park, recreational activities are organized and controlled. The public is welcome on ecological-educational routes, and scientific-cognitive routes. Lodging is available in designated centers in the park, as are campsites, picnic areas, and pavilions for group activities. Excursions and self-directed hiking require a small fee.

== See also ==
- National Parks of Ukraine
