= UTair Flight 120 =

2012 aviation accident in Russia

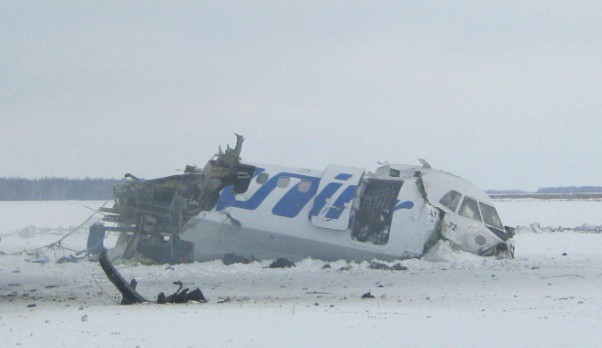
- Wreckage of the aircraft's forward section

Accident
- Date: 2 April 2012
- Summary: Crashed on take-off in icing conditions due to pilot error
- Site: Near Roschino International Airport, Tyumen, Russia; 57°09′26.4″N 65°16′00″E

Aircraft
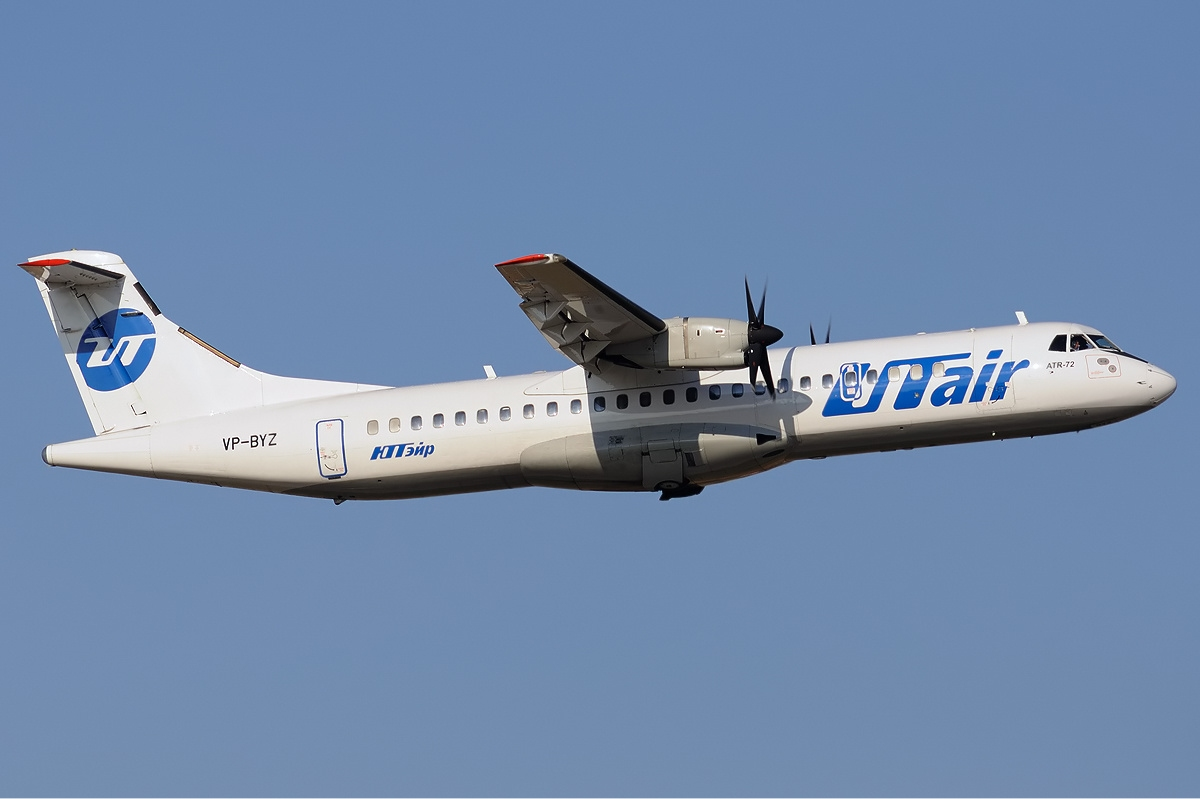
- VP-BYZ, the aircraft involved in the accident, seen in 2009
- Aircraft type: ATR 72-201
- Operator: UTair Aviation
- IATA flight No.: UT120
- ICAO flight No.: UTA120
- Call sign: UTAIR 120
- Registration: VP-BYZ
- Flight origin: Roschino International Airport, Tyumen, Russia
- Destination: Surgut Airport, Surgut, Russia
- Occupants: 43
- Passengers: 39
- Crew: 4
- Fatalities: 33
- Injuries: 10
- Survivors: 10

UTair Flight 120 was a scheduled domestic passenger flight from Tyumen to Surgut, Russia. On 2 April 2012, the ATR-72 turboprop aircraft operating the flight crashed shortly after take-off from Roschino International Airport, killing 33 of the 43 people on board. Investigation carried out by the Russian Interstate Aviation Committee (MAK) revealed that the aircraft had not been de-iced prior to its take-off, even though it had been parked for hours in snowy condition. The crew of the flight were aware that ice and snow had accumulated on the aircraft, but decided not to de-ice it.

== Accident ==
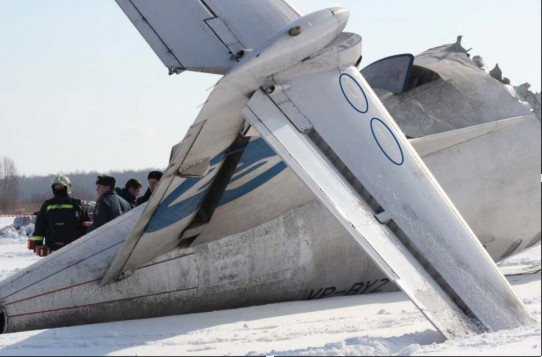
Wreckage of the aircraft's tail section

Flight 120 departed Tyumen, the largest city and the capital of Tyumen Oblast, to Surgut, a major city in Khanty-Mansi Autonomous Okrug with 39 passengers and 4 crew members on board, at 07:33 local time (01:33 UTC). The weather was "snow-mixed rain" at the time and the temperature was around 0 °C (32 °F). At about 600 feet (180 m), the autopilot was engaged and the flaps were retracted.

Almost simultaneously with the completion of flap retraction, the first officer expressed surprise, and the captain was recorded asking "What is this?" The aircraft began an uncommanded roll to the right, while the first officer asked, "What's this buffeting?" The crew immediately disengaged the autopilot. Within 3 seconds, the angle of the roll reached 40 degrees. The crew counteracted the right roll by applying ailerons and rudder, but were unable to counteract the subsequent left roll.

As Flight 120's movement became more erratic, it also began to lose its altitude. As intermittent stall warnings appeared, the crew appeared increasingly confused; when the captain asked the first officer to report their situation to the tower, the first officer replied with "Report what? Shit! What's the failure?" in a tone suggesting high levels of stress. At a left bank of 55 degrees and a nose-down angle of 11 degrees, the plane then crashed onto an open field near the runway at 07:34 local time (01:34 UTC) and burst into flames. The aircraft broke into several pieces. The accident occurred at about 1 nautical mile (1 mi; 2 km) southwest of the end of the main runway, near the village of Gorkovka. There were initially 31 fatalities (all four crew members and 29 of the 39 passengers) and 12 survivors from the 43 people on board. They were taken to the hospital in Tyumen. Two of the survivors later died of their injures, bringing the death toll to thirty-three and the number of survivors to ten. The Interstate Aviation Committee confirmed this as the official toll in the final report.

== Aircraft ==
The accident aircraft was an ATR 72-201, MSN 332, registered as VP-BYZ. The aircraft was manufactured in 1992 and first flew on 20 October. It was delivered to TransAsia Airways on 16 December 1992 and subsequently served with Finnair and Aero Airlines before entering service with UTair Aviation on 23 July 2008. The aircraft was equipped with two Pratt & Whitney PW124B engines.

== Passengers and crew ==
Flight 120 was carrying 39 passengers and 5 crew members. UTair had sold 40 tickets for the flight, but a passenger from Khanty-Mansi Autonomous Okrug failed to arrive on time. Nikolay Medvedev, a member of the board of Surgutneftegaz, was among the passengers.

The captain of the flight was 27-year old Sergey Sergeevich Antsin. He had completed his flight training in Ulyanovsk Civil Flying School and graduated in 2008, subsequently employed by Utair on the same year as a First Officer. He had accrued a total flying experience of 2,602 flight hours, of which 2,522 hours were on the ATR-72. He had also flown a Yakovlev Yak-18 and an Antonov An-26.

The co-pilot was identified as 23-year old Nikita Vitalievich Chekhlov. He had attended Krasnokutsk Civil Flight School in Krasnokutsk, Ukraine and graduated in 2008, later employed by Utair on the same year. He had accrued a total flying experience of 1,825 hours, of which 634 hours were on the ATR-72. In 2009, he had completed his ATR-72 training in Sabenavita Training Center in Lithuania.

== Investigation ==
CCTV stills showing UTair Flight 120 as it descends towards the ground.

Officials said investigators were focusing on the possibility of a technical malfunction as an eyewitness reported seeing smoke coming from the plane's engines as it came down. The aircraft's flight data recorder was recovered in good condition.

The Interstate Aviation Committee (MAK) released their final report on 16 July 2013. They determined the cause of the accident to be that the aircraft departed without having been de-iced, despite the crew having noticed the presence of ice during taxi. Under the conditions of the flight, the wing flap retraction should have occurred at 160 knots (300 km/h); instead, the crew retracted them at 139 knots (257 km/h), which is approximately the speed at which flap retraction would be performed under normal conditions. Immediately after flap retraction, the plane began exhibiting unusual behavior, though the crew seemed to have trouble identifying the problem, with the first officer sounding increasingly stressed as the situation developed. The situational stress may have contributed to the failure to apply appropriate recovery procedures. An engineering simulation concluded that the airplane was not contaminated enough by ice as to be unrecoverable; had the crew applied forward pressure on the control column and extended the flaps back to 15 degrees, the plane would have recovered after losing just 300–400 feet (90–120 m) of their pre-stall altitude. The pilots seemed preoccupied with the banking and buffeting of the airplane, and were pulling back on the control column until impact. The report also identified a number of contributing factors that had to do with the airline's safety and training deficiencies.

In November 2015, the court sentenced mechanic Andrey Pisarev and maintenance manager Anatoly Petrochenko to five years and one month in prison. Captain Sergey Antsin, who died in the crash, was also found guilty of the accident.

== See also ==
- Palair Macedonian Airlines Flight 301, similar crash in 1993 in which the pilot decided not to de-ice the plane
