= UTair Cargo =

Russian airline

UTAir Cargo
IATA	ICAO	Call sign
-	TUM	-
- Founded: 1997
- Hubs: Plekhanov, Tyumen
- Fleet size: 39
- Destinations: 22 (scheduled)
- Parent company: Utair
- Headquarters: Plekhanov, Tyumen
- Website: www.utair-cargo.ru

UTAir Cargo is a Russian cargo airline based in Plekhanov, Tyumen and a subsidiary of Utair.

== Destinations ==
UTair Cargo carries out aerial survey work, forest fire observation, paratrooper and charter passenger transport, and mail deliveries on behalf of DHL Aviation. It operates scheduled freight flights to Afghanistan, Azerbaijan, Tajikistan, Kazakhstan, Ukraine, Turkey, Egypt, Sudan, Bahrain, Nordholz (Germany), Liège (Belgium), Helsinki (Finland), Budapest (Hungary), Zürich (Switzerland) and Gdańsk (Poland). On 12 April 2012, UTAir Cargo also launched operations to the North Pole.

== Fleet ==
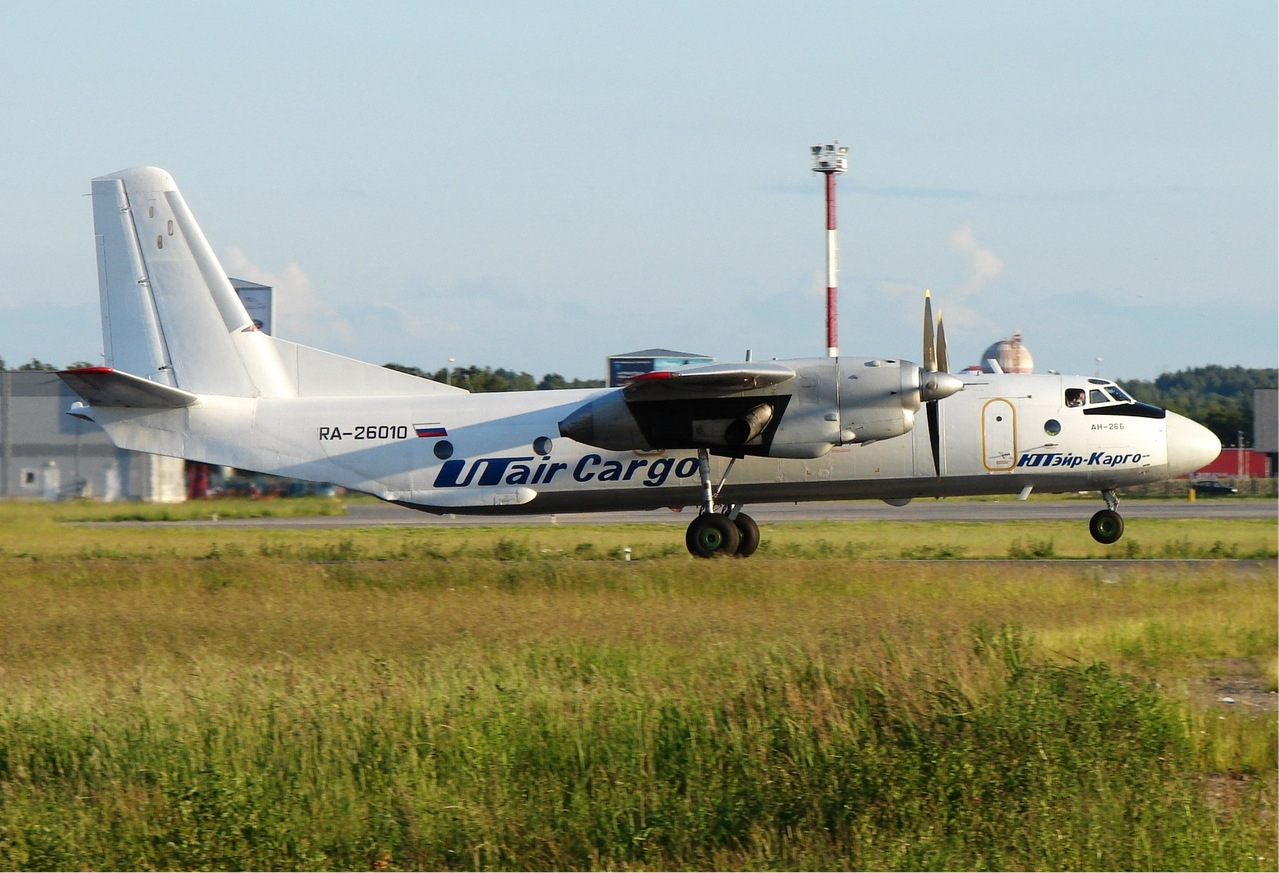
UTair Cargo Antonov An-26

As of June 2019, the UTair Cargo fleet consists of the following aircraft:

Aircraft type	Active	Notes
Antonov An-2	8	13 stored.
Antonov An-24RV	17	
Antonov An-26	2	
Antonov An-74	6	1 stored.
Yakovlev Yak-42D	6	
Total	39	
