= Kurumoch International Airport =

Airport serving Samara and Tolyatti, Russia

Kurumoch International Airport Международный аэропорт «Курумоч»

- IATA: KUF; ICAO: UWWW

Summary
- Airport type: public
- Owner: JSC "Kurumoch International Airport"
- Operator: HC Airports of Regions
- Serves: Samara, Russia, Tolyatti
- Location: Samara, Russia
- Elevation AMSL: 477 ft (145 m)
- Coordinates: 53°30′18″N 50°9′18″E
- Website: ar-kuf.ru

Map
- Location of the airport in Samara Oblast Location of the airport in Russia Location of the airport in Europe

Runways
Direction	Length		Surface
Direction	ft	m	Surface
05/23	8,360	2,548	Asphalt concrete
15/33	9,846	3,001	Concrete

Statistics (2018)
- Passenger Traffic: 3,056,610
- Time Zone: UTC +4
- Operating Time: 24/7, All Year
- Sources: Russian Federal Air Transport Agency (see also provisional 2018 statistics)

Kurumoch International Airport (Russian: Международный аэропорт "Курумоч") (IATA: KUF, ICAO: UWWW) is the international airport serving the city of Samara, Russia, located 35 km (22 mi) north of the city. Besides Samara, the airport serves Tolyatti – the second largest city in the region. The name of the airport originated from the closest village of Kurumoch 7 km (4 mi) southwest. Kurumoch was used as a hub for Samara Airlines until the airline's bankruptcy in 2008. In 2011, Kurumoch was acquired by the largest airport holding and management company in Russia, Airports of Regions.

== Description ==
Kurumoch became officially operational on 15 May 1961, as a domestic airport. The airport is notable for being the largest airport (by passenger traffic) in the Volga Federal District. In 2017, Kurumoch Airport served 2,649,426 passengers, a 26.6% increase from the previous year. Over 30 airlines made 12,959 departures to 43 destinations in 2017, in addition to 3,483 tons of cargo being processed at the cargo terminal. As of August 2018, the airport is ranked 13th in Russia by passenger count, with 2,092,064 after the 8-month period, an increase of 20.7% from August 2017 results.

== History ==
=== 1957–1991 ===
On 19 December 1957, in accordance with a decree of the Council of Ministers of the Soviet Union, the construction of Kurumoch Airport commenced. Construction was overseen and managed by N.P. Skrinsky, the chairman of the Kuybyshev airport from 7 January 1958 to 14 December 1959. The airport was at first named Kurumoch Airport, but was later renamed Kuybyshev Airport because Samara's official name from 1935 to 1991 was Kuybyshev. The airport did not have a domestic or international passenger status, because the initial purpose of the airport was for military practices and cargo imports/exports.

Kurumoch airport at night.

On 30 July 1960, Kuybyshev Airport became operational for military purposes. On that same day, the first avionic practice was held with Ilyushin Il-18s and Antonov An-10s, authorized by the Main Directorate of the Civil Air Fleet (ГУ ГВФ). Kuybyshev Airport was also used as a transit aerodrome for short-range aircraft in need of refuelling.

On 27 February 1961, the first commercial flight from Kuybyshev Airport to Sheremetyevo International Airport, Moscow, was piloted by V. A. Mikhailov. On 15 May 1961, Kuybyshev gained domestic passenger status and had its first daily flight to Mineralnye Vody. That same year, Kuybyshev Airport was granted flights to Leningrad (St. Petersburg), Tashkent, Adler, etc.

Construction continued between 1965 and 1970, with a new maintenance hangar, baggage claim facility, 5-story hotel, a second runway, and new oil storage bunkers added to the airport's infrastructure. In 1970, approximately 700,000 passengers and 27,000 tonnes of cargo passed through Kuybyshev Airport. By 1971, all the facilities and expansions were completed. In 1972, construction on a training center for flight engineers was completed. That same year, after endurance tests were completed, the second runway was exploited for commercial use.

Between 1981 and 1990, Kuybyshev Airport underwent two indoor reconstructions. The second one, in 1989, was for the purpose of creating two different lounge areas. After the fall of the Soviet Union, the two areas became the airport's domestic departure zone. A new flight catering facility was constructed. The facility demanded a large quantity of electricity for the freezers and conveyor belts, thus a much stronger transmission tower cable system was run to the airport. This also improved the living conditions of the village of Kurumoch nearby, which the cable ran through. In 1990, Kuybyshev Airport reached its passenger traffic peak of 3,700,000.

=== 1991–2011 ===
Preceding the dissolution of the Soviet Union, the City of Kuybyshev was renamed Samara. In 1992, after meeting with the ICAO requirements, Kurumoch Airport was granted international status. In 1993, the construction of a new international terminal was completed. It is still used to this day as the main and only terminal.

On 19 February 1993, the airport created an Open Joint-Stock Company (OJSC) Samara Airlines. Samara Airlines was made for the benefit and prosperity of the Kuybyshev International Airport. On 9 December 1994, the airport made another OJSC "International Airport Samara".

On 31 May 2002, Kuybyshev International Airport was renamed to Kurumoch International Airport. The previous name was dismissed because of its ties with the Soviet Union (the city and airport were named after Valerian Kuybyshev: a pro-Soviet revolutionary). It was renamed to Kurumoch after the small village near the airport, and due to the fact that the airport's original name was Kurumoch Airport.

During 2007, with Rosaviatsia in cooperation with Russia's Ministry of Transport, a systematic plan was created in order to boost regional and general aviation in Russia between 2008 and 2020. This included the optimization of Russian air companies (Aeroflot, S7, etc.) and airports, as well as the creation of transit traffic and hub airports. Kurumoch was prospectively regarded as the best hub airport for the Volga Federal District.

=== 2011–2015 ===
In 2011, as was demanded by the President of Russia Dmitry Medvedev, OJSC "International Airport Samara" was to auction 50.99% of its shares to capitalist investors. That same year Airports of Regions, the largest airport holding company in Russia (and held by Renova Group), won their bid on the investment towards Kurumoch International Airport.

On 17 January 2012, "Koltsovo Invest" and JSC "Development Corporation Samara Region" signed a contract officially realizing the Kurumoch development project. The contract stated that in Phase I of construction, Airports of Regions was to build a new terminal no less than 35,000 m^{2} in size, and the facility was to be exploited no later than 31 December 2014. The contract also noted that the airport was to have a passenger traffic handling rate of 3,500,000 passengers annually, and cost approximately 12,300,000,000 rubles (via 2011 currency rate), 4,311,000,000 of which were to be invested by private owners/companies. Most of the contract clauses regarding Phase I of the development project were met.

=== 2015 – present ===
Phase II is set between 2015 and 2018, and is aimed at increasing the area of the then existing terminal (an additional 25,000 m^{2}, creating a facility with 60,000 m^{2} total surface), the construction of a new 4-star hotel, a business center, a multi-storey parking area, and an Aeroexpress/train station. After Phase II, the airport should be able to handle up to 3,500,000 passengers annually.

In 2017, Skytrax awarded Kurumoch Airport 4 stars, and made it the fourth airport in Russia and the CIS after Baku, Kazan and Yekaterinburg, which also belong to Airports of Regions.

== Sponsorship and charity donations ==
Since the 1970s, Kurumoch International Airport has sponsored FC Polet, which it co-created with USSR theater performer Alexander Komissarov. Today, the football club is sponsored by the JSC "Kurumoch International Airport". In November 2014, Kurumoch International Airport, decided to relocate all matches played by FC Polet in the next season to the Metallurg Stadium in Samara.

== Infrastructure ==
Kurumoch's main entrance and check-in desks

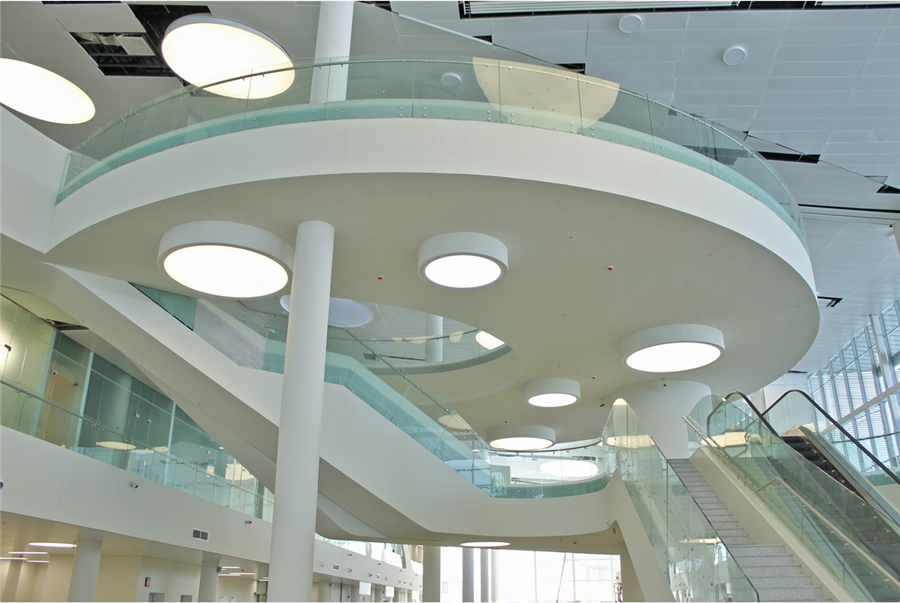
The "space" styled interior of the airport.

Today, the airport consists of 2 runways, 1 cargo terminal, 1 VIP terminal (departure and arrivals), and 2 airport facilities. Kurumoch has 50 parking slots for various types of aircraft.

=== Terminal A ===
Also known as the main terminal and the departure building, Terminal A is the most widely used facility of the entire airport. Terminal A finished construction in 1993, but underwent major renovations in 1998 and 2004. The building is 11,340 m^{2} and consists of 3 floors: the underground floor, floor 1 and floor 2. the main terminal serves as the departure for international and domestic flights (including baggage handling for departure flights) and as an air traffic control tower. Additionally, most of JSC International Airport "Kurumoch"'s offices are located in terminal A. Altogether, Terminal A has a capacity of 750 passengers per hour. The domestic zone has a capacity of 600 passengers per hour, while the international terminal can handle 150 passengers per hour.

Renovations within the terminal have been made as recently as spring 2014. Floor 1 consists of 8 check-in desks for domestic departures and 6 for international and the domestic departure lounge. Floor 2 has a variety of air company offices, the international departure zone and staff rooms.

=== VIP terminal ===
The business terminal was built in 2004. It can handle 50 passengers per hour. The business terminal offers private check-in desks and a lounge area with standard entertainment systems. Kurumoch also offers all business class personnel a ride to their aircraft by separate buses.

=== Runways/Other ===
The airport contains 2 runways, but at the moment only the used runway is equipped with ILS equipment and certified with a category IIIA ICAO ILS license. The used runway is 3,001mx55m and is made of asphalt-concrete. The second runway was 2,548x60m and made of concrete, but is currently under reconstruction. The cargo terminal can handle 200 tonnes per hour and is 3,758 m^{2}.

== Construction ==
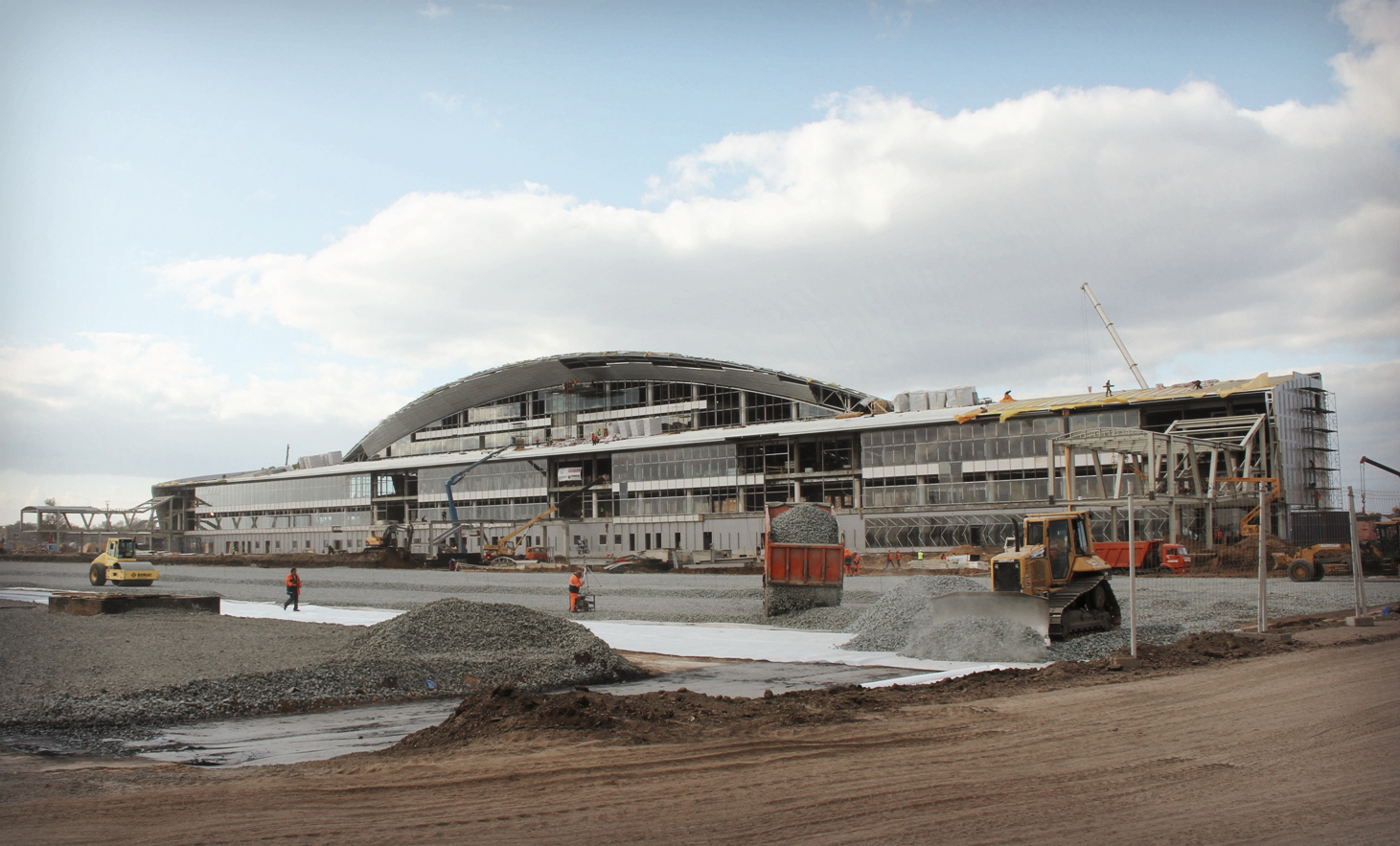
Terminal 1 on 19 September 2014.

View of the airport from the runway.

=== Decision for a new terminal ===
In the 1990s, Kurumoch's passenger traffic rate was decreasing, therefore it didn't have any significant investments. The passenger traffic was relatively low and could be served with comfort in the old terminal. But as the passenger traffic rate began to increase, the problem of overcrowding was a potential threat. Kurumoch's terminal was meant for approximately 1,250,000 passengers annually, but in 2008 the airport was already serving over 1,400,000 passengers. The main terminal did not have any definite arrival section until the late 1990s and today's Domestic and International Baggage claim is not equipped to handle such a flow of passengers.

In spring 2011, a contest over the investment towards a complete reconstruction of Kurumoch's facilities was announced. In fall 2011, HC Airports of Regions won the bid and gained full legal rights over the investment of Kurumoch International Airport. Airports of Regions finished developing their complete plan on the construction of multiple new facilities in the spring of 2012. The construction was split into 2 phases: Phase I and Phase II. The initial price of the new airport was placed at 339,11,1370 USD or 13,000,000,000 rubles. Today, the builders of the new airport are CJSC KOMPACT Saint Petersburg. KOMPAKT set their deadline on the completion of Phase I on 31 December 2014. Phase II is said to be completed by the spring of 2018; before the 2018 FIFA World Cup, in which Samara is an official host city.

=== Phase I ===
Phase I will include the construction of Terminal B, ground parking lot, a new cargo terminal, and additionally the reconstruction of the unused runway.

The airport terminal will have 7 jet bridges, 2 of them being double bridges, 4 conveyor belts, 2,000 m^{2} of Duty-free shops, a Business Lounge, 24 check-in desks, and commercial shops/restaurants. The new terminal itself is said to be over 41,700 m^{2}. The jet bridges will be supplied by the Thyssen Krupp company. The airport will have 5 floors all together: 3 main floors and 2 mezzanines. The very first floor will have the check-in desks, baggage wrapping, commercial stores such as Good Trip, and Zdorovye Lyudi (Здоровые Люди). Blueprints show the arrivals and baggage claim section on the second floor. The third floor will contain security desks, passport control and the departure zone, as well as the duty-free shops and the VIP Lounge. The Domestic and International security check stations and passport control will be separate from each other. The Domestic part of the airport is said to have 4 jet bridges, while the international will have 3. There will be 7 Gates for the jet bridges and 6 for the bus systems. The new terminal will have a variety of restaurants. The airport will be able to handle up to 4,000,000 passengers per year.

=== Phase II ===
Phase II will include the construction of a business center and hotel connected to or near Terminal B, a train system from Kurumoch International Airport to Samara and a levelled parking lot.

== Airlines and destinations ==
Airlines	Destinations
Aeroflot	Moscow–Sheremetyevo, Sochi
Air Arabia	Sharjah (suspended until 2027-03-27)
Air Cairo	Seasonal charter: Sharm El Sheikh
AlMasria Universal Airlines	Seasonal charter: Hurghada, Sharm El Sheikh
Azimuth	Mineralnye Vody, Nizhnevartovsk, Yaroslavl
Azur Air	Seasonal charter: Antalya, Hambantota–Mattala, Pattaya, Phuket, Sharm El Sheikh
Centrum Air	Tashkent
Flydubai	Seasonal: Dubai–International
Ikar	Sochi
NordStar	Moscow–Domodedovo
Nordwind Airlines	Kaliningrad, Sochi
Pobeda	Moscow–Sheremetyevo, Moscow–Vnukovo, Saint Petersburg, Sochi
Red Wings Airlines	Almaty, Barnaul, Batumi, Chelyabinsk, Istanbul, Makhachkala, Minsk, Moscow–Zhukovsky, Nizhny Novgorod, Novy Urengoy, Urgench, Tashkent, Tbilisi, Tyumen, Yekaterinburg, Yerevan; Seasonal: Gelendzhik; Seasonal charter: Hambantota–Mattala, Phuket
Rossiya	Krasnoyarsk–International, Saint Petersburg, Yerevan; Seasonal charter: Hurghada, Sharm El Sheikh
S7 Airlines	Moscow–Domodedovo, Novosibirsk
Smartavia	Moscow–Sheremetyevo, Saint Petersburg
Somon Air	Dushanbe
Ural Airlines	Dushanbe, Khujand, Moscow–Domodedovo, Osh, Sochi
Utair	Moscow–Vnukovo, Surgut, Yekaterinburg
UVT Aero	Kazan, Novy Urengoy, Perm, Tobolsk, Usinsk; Seasonal: Petrozavodsk
Uzbekistan Airways	Namangan

== Statistics ==
=== Annual traffic ===
Annual passenger traffic
Year	Passengers	% Change
2010	1,570,911	Steady
2011	1,740,641	▲10.8%
2012	1,890,483	▲8.6%
2013	2,167,728	▲14.7%
2014	2,377,418	▲9.7%
2015	2,208,129	▼7.1%
2016	2,091,818	▼5.3%
2017	2,649,426	▲26.7%
2018	3,085,386	▲17.0%
2019	3,010,000	▼2.4%
2020	1,675,034	▼44.4%
2021	2,993,142	▲78.7%
2022	2,900,000	▲3.0%
2023	3,540,000	▲22.1%
2024	3,570,000	▲0.8%

== Accidents and incidents ==
- On 8 March 1965, Aeroflot Flight 513 crashed shortly after taking off. Thirty of the 39 people on board were killed.
- On 20 October 1986, Aeroflot Flight 6502 crashed during landing, killing 70 of the 94 people on board.
- On 17 March 2007, a UTair Tupolev Tu-134 operating as UTair Flight 471 crash-landed killing seven people and injuring some 23 more.

== See also ==
- List of the busiest airports in Russia
- List of the busiest airports in Europe
- List of the busiest airports in the former USSR
