= FC Polet =

Russian football club

FC Polet Samara
- Full name: Футбольный Клуб "Полёт"
- Nickname: "Layener" or "Лайнер"
- Founded: 13 June 2006; 20 years ago
- Ground: Metallurg Stadium, Samara, Russia
- Capacity: 33,001
- Coordinates: 53°14′18″N 50°16′18″E
- Manager: Mikhail Komisarov
- League: Samara Premier League
- 2013-2014: 8th
- Website: http://www.fc-polet.ru/

FC Polet is a professional football club founded and based in Samara, Samarskaya Oblast, Russia. The football club was founded in the mid-1970s in cooperation and under the sponsorship of Kurumoch International Airport and Alexander Mikhailkovich, a USSR theater performer. Today, FC Polet is sponsored by JSC "Kurumoch International Airport", which is managed by Kurumoch International Airport.
