= Krasnokutsk =

Rural locality in Kharkiv Oblast, Ukraine

Krasnokutsk Краснокутськ
- Rural settlement
- Coat of arms

- Location within Ukraine Location within Kharkiv Oblast
- Coordinates: 50°04′N 35°10′E
- Country: Ukraine
- Oblast: Kharkiv Oblast
- Raion: Bohodukhiv Raion
- Hromada: Krasnokutsk settlement hromada

Population (2022)
  - Total: 7,164
- Time zone: UTC+2 (EET)
  - Summer (DST): UTC+3 (EEST)

Krasnokutsk (Ukrainian: Краснокутськ; Russian: Краснокутск) is a rural settlement in Bohodukhiv Raion, Kharkiv Oblast, Ukraine. It hosts the administration of Krasnokutsk settlement hromada, one of the hromadas of Ukraine. Population: 7,164 (2022 estimate).

Krasnokutsk is located on the right bank of the Merla River, a left tributary of the Vorskla River in the drainage basin of the Dnieper.

== History ==
It was a village in Bogodukhov uyezd of Kharkov Governorate of the Russian Empire. A former monastery is now the site of Krasnokutskyi arboretum.

A local newspaper is published here since 1930.

During World War II it was under German occupation from October 1941 to August 1943.

In January 1989 the population was 8511 people. In January 2013 the population was 7744 people.

Until 18 July 2020, Krasnokutsk was the administrative center of Krasnokutsk Raion. The raion was abolished in July 2020 as part of the administrative reform of Ukraine, which reduced the number of raions of Kharkiv Oblast to seven. The area of Krasnokutsk Raion was merged into Bohodukhiv Raion.

Until 26 January 2024, Krasnokutsk was designated urban-type settlement. On this day, a new law entered into force which abolished this status, and Krasnokutsk became a rural settlement.

== Economy ==
=== Transportation ===
Krasnokutsk is on a road connecting Bohodukhiv in Kharkiv Oblast with Opishnia in Poltava Oblast, with further access to the West to Poltava and Myrhorod. There are local roads as well.

The closest railway station is in Hubarivka, about 30 kilometres (19 mi) northeast, on the railway connecting Kharkiv and Sumy.
