= Bogodukhovsky Uyezd =

District in the Russian Empire

Bogodukhovsky Uyezd Богодуховский уездъ Богодухівський повіт
- Former subdivision of the Russian Empire
- 1780–1923
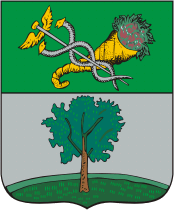
- Coat of arms

- Capital: Bogodukhov
- Population
  - (1897): 159 806
- History
  - Established: 1780
  - Disestablished: 1923
Preceded by
Okhtyrka Regiment

Bogodukhovsky Uyezd (Russian: Богодуховский уезд; Ukrainian: Богодухівський повіт, romanized: Bohodukhivskyi povit) was an uyezd (district) in the Kharkov Governorate of the Russian Empire.

== History ==
The uyezd was created on April 25, 1780, by order of Catherine the Great. The administrative centre of the uyezd was the small town of Bogodukhov. From that time, Bogodukhov received its own coat of arms.

The uyezd had two towns, Bogodukhov and Krasnokutsk, and consisted of 18 volosts.

In the 1870s, a railway was built through the uyezd and Bogodukhov railway station was constructed in 1878.

In January 1897, according to the Russian Empire Census, the population of the uyezd was 159,806 people.

In the Soviet administrative reform of 1923, the uyezd was transformed into the Bogodukhov okrug.

== Demographics ==
At the time of the Russian Empire Census of 1897, Bogodukhovsky Uyezd had a population of 159 806. Of these, 88.2% spoke Ukrainian, 9.9% Russian, 1.6% Belarusian, 0.1% Polish, 0.1% Yiddish and 0.1% German as their native language.
