= UTair Flight 471 =

2007 aviation accident

Coordinates: 53°30′6″N 050°9′18″E

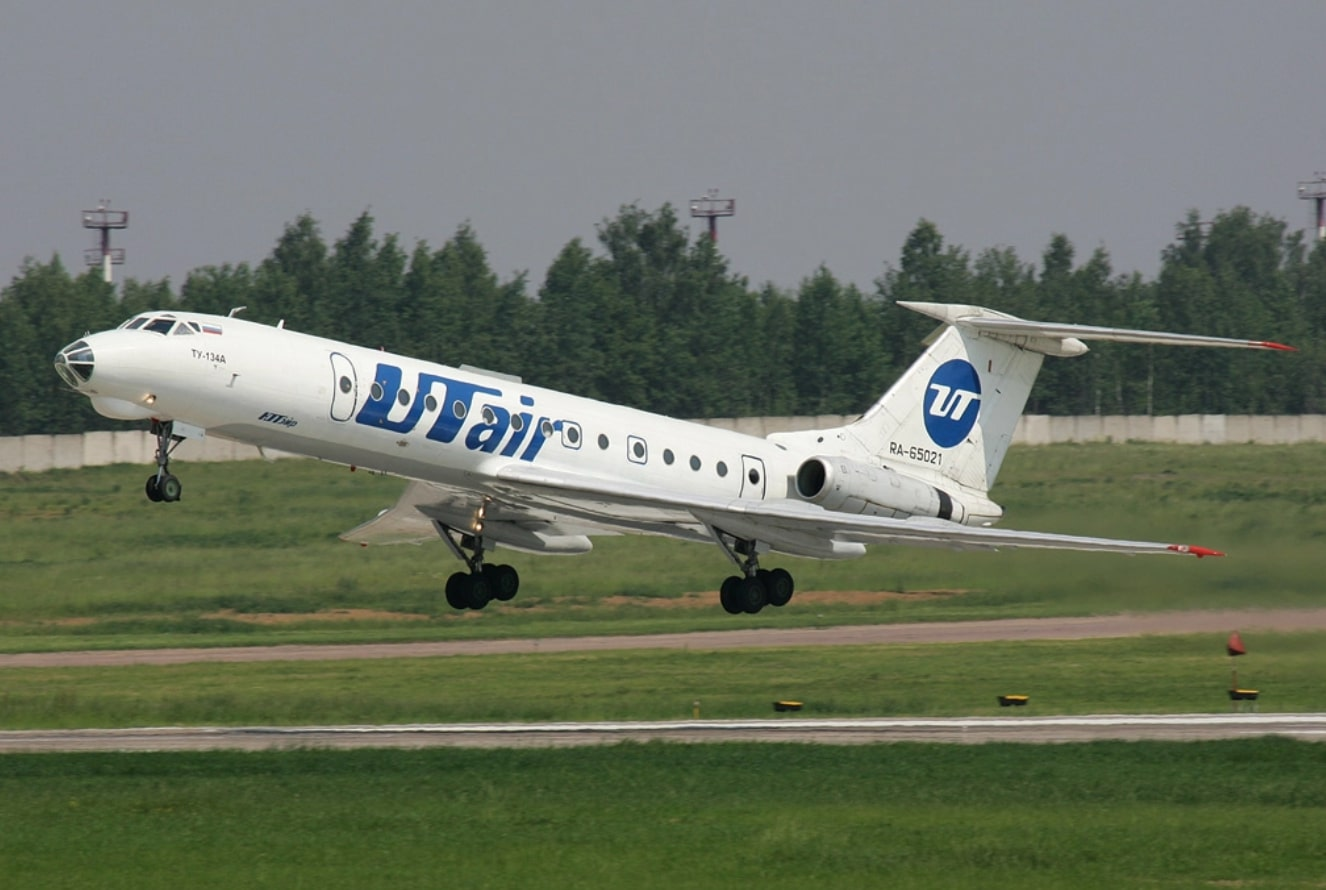
- RA-65021, the aircraft involved, seen in 2006

Accident
- Date: 17 March 2007
- Summary: Controlled flight into terrain due to pilot error
- Site: Samara Kurumoch Airport (IATA: KUF; ICAO: UWWW) near Samara, Russia

Aircraft
- Aircraft type: Tupolev Tu-134A-3
- Operator: UTair Aviation
- Call sign: UTAIR 471
- Registration: RA-65021
- Flight origin: Surgut Airport
- Stopover: Samara Kurumoch Airport
- Destination: Belgorod International Airport
- Occupants: 57
- Passengers: 50
- Crew: 7
- Fatalities: 6
- Injuries: 20
- Survivors: 51

UTair Flight 471 was a scheduled domestic passenger flight of a Tupolev Tu-134 on 17 March 2007, that impacted the ground short of the runway at Samara Kurumoch Airport, causing the aircraft to bounce, lose a wing and roll onto its back. Of the 50 passengers and 7 crew members on board, 6 people were killed and 20 injured when the aircraft broke apart. The plane was flying from the Siberian city of Surgut to Samara and then to Belgorod.

== Background ==
The aircraft was a Tupolev Tu-134 passenger aircraft, operated by UTair. On the day of the accident the aircraft was thought to be carrying 50 passengers and seven crew. It was flying as a domestic passenger carrier based in Surgut Airport, serving Surgut, Siberia and Belgorod, with a scheduled stop in Samara.

== Event ==
The aircraft was landing at Samara Kurumoch Airport, when it touched down about 400 metres (1,300 ft; 440 yd) short of a runway in heavy fog, bouncing and flipping over. Six people were killed and 26 injured. The accident occurred at about 10:45 a.m. local time (06:45 GMT). The aircraft did not catch fire after the accident.

== Emergency response ==
At least 23 people were hospitalized in facilities in Samara and nearby Tolyatti, six of whom were in serious condition. Six people were trapped in the wreckage for a total of three hours before being cut free by rescue crews. 23 more people were not injured but received psychological treatment at the airport.

== Investigation ==
According to transport officials and prosecutors a full investigation was launched by the relevant authorities. Investigators state that they recovered the cockpit voice recorder and flight data recorder on the day of the accident and studied them to determine the cause of the accident. Prosecutors investigating the crash in Samara said bad weather and pilot error were the most likely causes.

Initial analysis of the flight data recorder suggests the aircraft was not experiencing any obvious technical malfunction before the accident. Russia's interstate aviation committee MAK states a preliminary assessment shows both engines were operating up to the point of impact. The aircraft was in landing configuration, with the undercarriage lowered and the flaps positioned at 30 degrees, and did not suffer fire or other damage while airborne.

According to the findings of the official MAK investigation, the crash can be blamed on both the airport services, which did not inform the pilot about the reduced visibility in time due to organizational problems, and on the pilot, who did not give the dispatcher the correct information about his landing trajectory and, consequently, did not decide to stop the landing procedure and try to take another approach at the time he should have done so.

== UTair's reaction ==
Within hours of the crash, UTair issued a statement saying that the aircraft had been in good technical condition and that foggy weather was likely to have caused the accident. The company also said the crew was well-skilled and had long experience. They also decided to pay out US$75,000 to the families of each deceased person.

== Prosecution ==
The captain and co-pilot of the aircraft were both tried at a regional court in Samara on charges of negligence causing the deaths of two or more people. The captain was sentenced to six years imprisonment and the co-pilot to two years imprisonment. The sentences were suspended.

== See also ==
- List of accidents and incidents involving commercial aircraft
