= Utair =

Airline of Russia

JSC "Utair Aviation" ПАО «Авиакомпания «ЮТэйр»

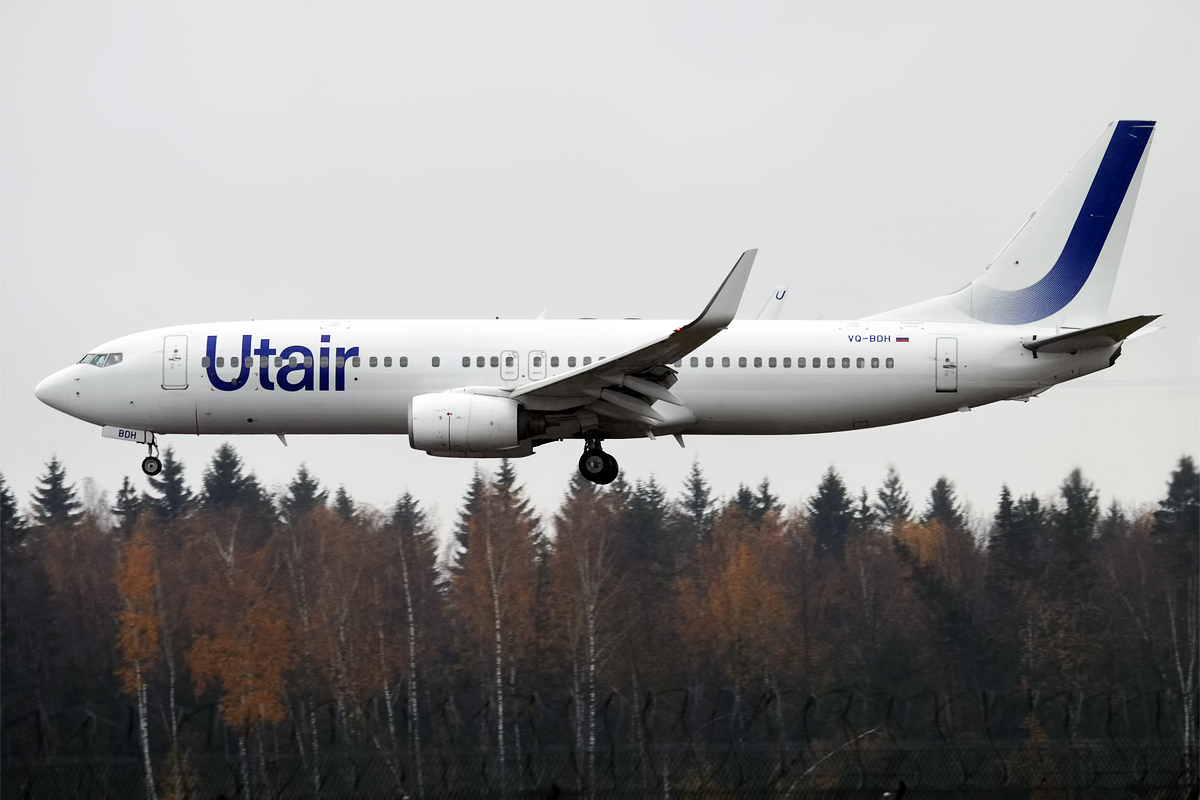
- UTair Boeing 737-800
IATA	ICAO	Call sign
UT	UTA	UTAIR
- Founded: February 1967; 59 years ago (as part of Aeroflot); 1991; 35 years ago
- Hubs: Vnukovo International Airport; Farman Salmanov Surgut Airport
- Frequent-flyer program: STATUS
- Subsidiaries: UTair Cargo
- Fleet size: 60
- Destinations: 53
- Traded as: MCX: UTAR
- Headquarters: Khanty-Mansiysk, Russia
- Key people: Andrei Martirosov, Managing Director; Igor Petrov, CFO
- Website: Utair.ru

Utair (Russian: ПАО «Авиакомпания «ЮТэйр») (MCX: UTAR), formerly UTair, is a Russian airline with its head office at Khanty-Mansiysk Airport while its hubs are at Farman Salmanov Surgut Airport and Vnukovo International Airport. It operates scheduled domestic and some international passenger services, scheduled helicopter services, and extensive charter flights with fixed-wing aircraft and helicopters in support of the oil and gas industry across western Siberia. It is banned from flying in the EU.

== History ==
UTair's former logo

In February 1967, the Aeroflot Tyumen Directorate was set up to meet the transport requirements of the fast-growing oil and gas industry undergoing development in western Siberia. In the wake of the break-up of the Aeroflot organization, Tyumenaviatrans Aviation (TAT) was formed in 1991 to replace the Aeroflot Tyumen Directorate. TAT adopted the name of UTair in 2002. The airline is owned by Khanty Mansiysk District administration (23%), Surgut City administration (19%), Russian shareholders and companies (33%), the Russian Federation (2%), and private foreign investors (20%).

In October 2010, UTair announced plans to replace its Tupolev Tu-134 fleet with the Sukhoi Superjet 100. In December, UTair officially placed an order for 24 of the jets to enter service in 2013. Also in 2010, the airline named a Tu-154 aircraft after Boris Shcherbina, a Tyumen figure who played a major role in the response to the Chernobyl Disaster.

In November 2014, UTair faced financial difficulties and was unable to make a bond payment. In April 2015, UTair announced a fleet reduction of over 50 aircraft due to financial difficulty. It also cancelled its order for 24 Sukhoi Superjet 100 aircraft. A few weeks later, its regional airline subsidiary UTair Express ceased operations.

In December 2015, it was announced that UTair sold its leisure subsidiary Azur Air to Turkish tourism company Anex Tourism Group, which had bought UTair-Ukraine a few weeks earlier. On 31 October 2017, Utair announced its rebranding and changing its name from "UTair Aviation" to "Utair".

In 2021, AK-Invest, investment vehicle of Surgutneftegas, held the majority 50.11% stake of the airline. 38.82% belonged to the Khanty-Mansi Autonomous Okrug, 8.44% to the Tyumen Region, 2.619% to other minority investors.

On 8 April 2022, the US Department of Commerce restricted flights on aircraft manufactured in the US for Aeroflot, Aviastar, Azur Air, Belavia, Rossiya and Utair due to Russian invasion of Ukraine. On 16 June, the US broadened its restrictions on the six airlines after violations of the sanctions regime were detected. The effect of the restrictions is to ground the US-manufactured part of its fleet.

== Destinations ==
As of November 2023, UTair serves eight countries with 123 routes.

=== Codeshare agreements ===
Utair has a codeshare agreement with following airlines:

- Air Company ALROSA
- Belavia
- RusLine
- Turkish Airlines
- Yamal Airlines

=== Interline agreements ===
Utair as well has interline agreements with the following airlines:

- Air Company ALROSA
- Aeroflot
- Azerbaijan Airlines
- Belavia
- RusLine
- Ural Airlines

== Fleet ==
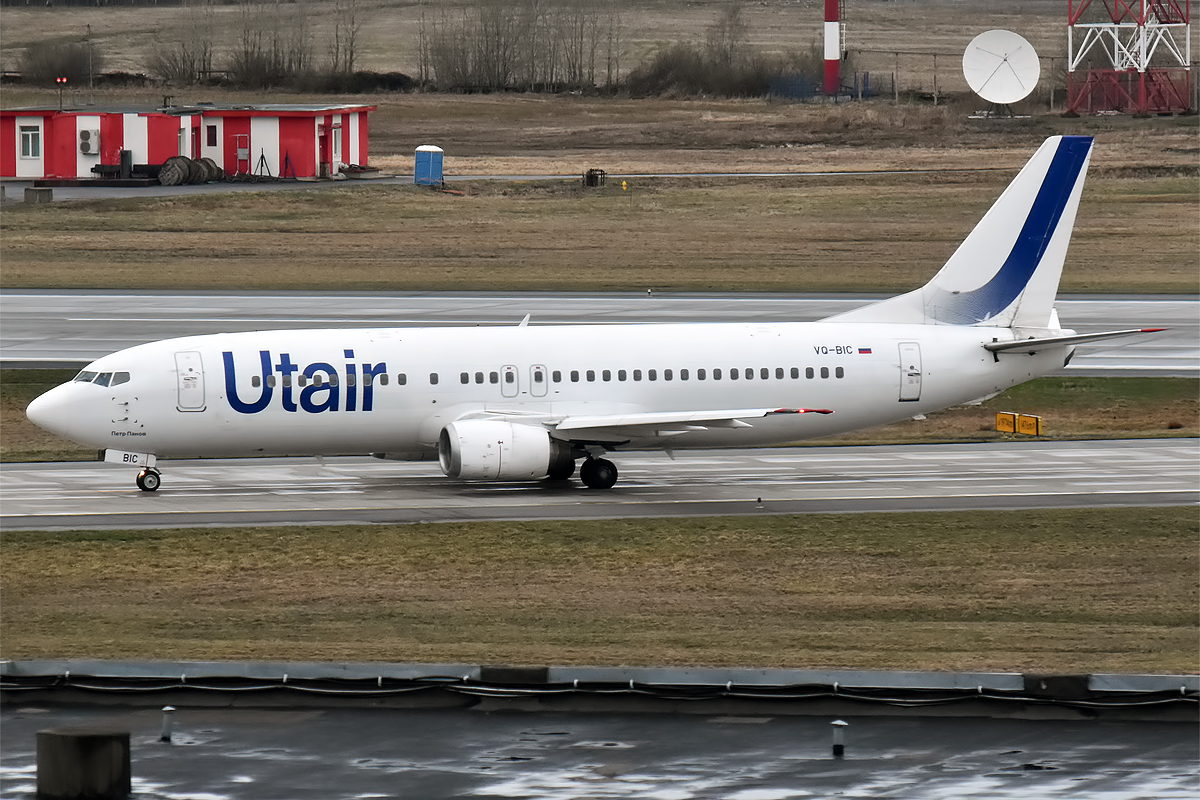
Utair Boeing 737-400 wearing the airline's latest livery

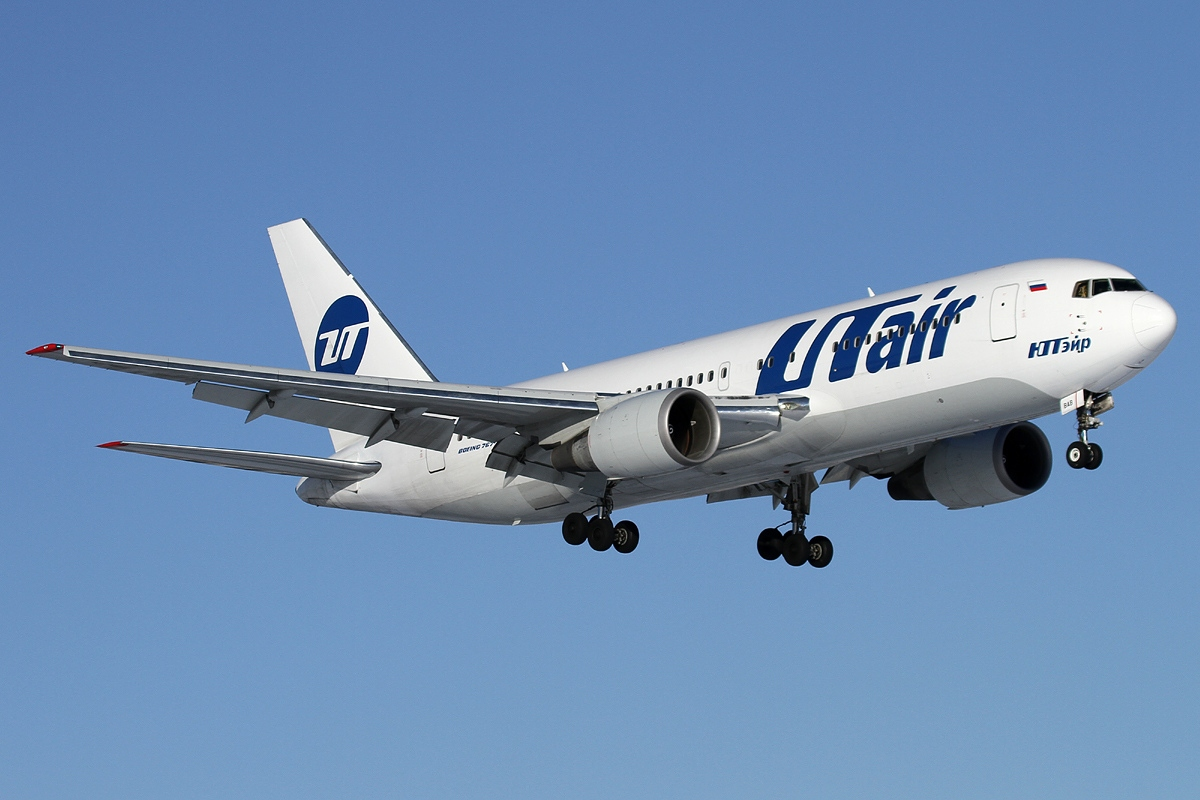
Utair is one of the world's last operators of the Boeing 767-200ER (pictured in former livery).

=== Current fleet ===
As of August 2025, Utair operates the following aircraft: (excluding helicopters and subsidiaries' aircraft):

Aircraft	In service	Orders	Passengers				Notes
Aircraft	In service	Orders	J	Y	Total	Refs	Notes
ATR 72-500	15	—	—	70	70		One crashed.
Boeing 737-400	6	—	6	144	150		Including RA-73069 / MSN 28478, the last Boeing 737 Classic ever built.
Boeing 737-500	19	—	8	108	116		
Boeing 737-500	19	—	—	126	126		
Boeing 737-800	17	—	8	165	173		
Boeing 767-200ER	3	—	—	249	249		
Total	60	—					

=== Retired fleet ===
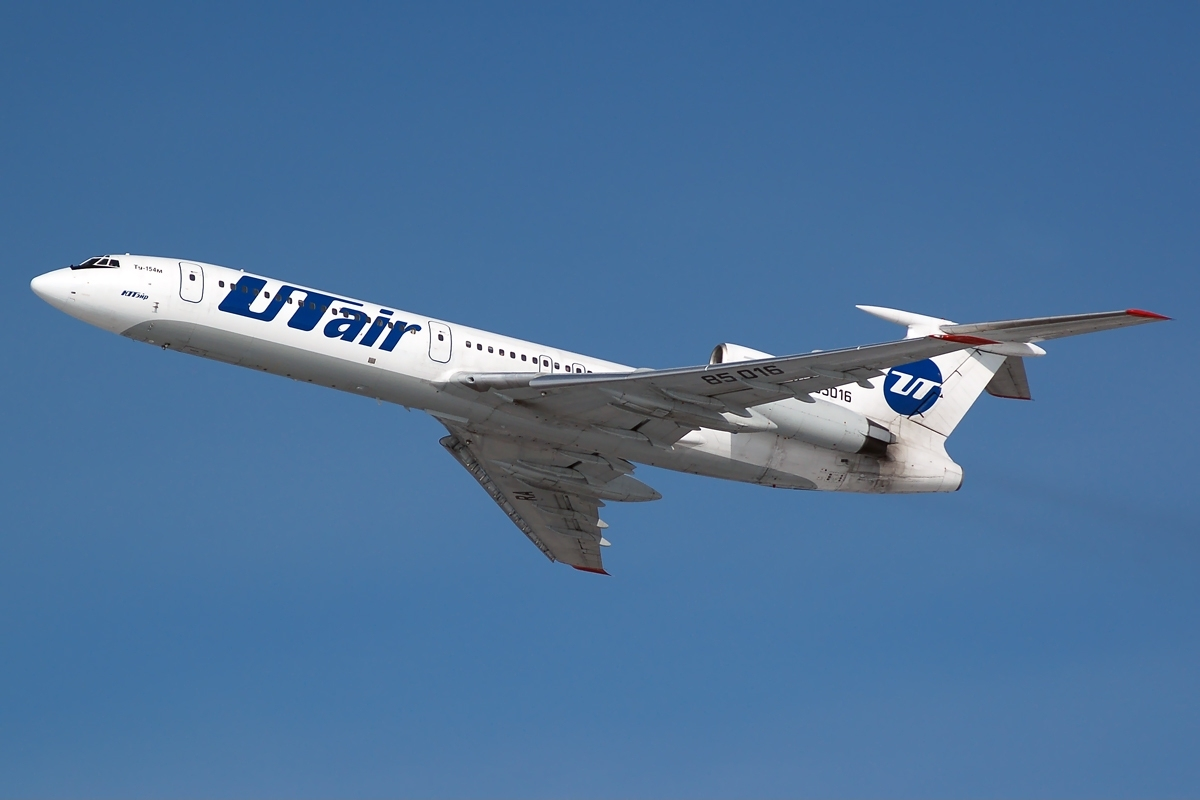
A former UTair Tupolev Tu-154M

The airline used to operate these aircraft before.

Aircraft	Year introduced	Year retired	Notes
Airbus A321-200	2013	2015	The only Airbus aircraft in the fleet.
Antonov An-24	1993	2014	
ATR 42-300	2005	2014	
Bombardier CRJ100LR	2010	2014	
Bombardier CRJ200LR	2010	2014	
Boeing 757-200	2010	2015	
Boeing 767-300	2014	2015	
Tupolev Tu-134	1999	2014	
Tupolev Tu-154M	1992	2014	One of the last Russian operators of this aircraft.
Yakovlev Yak-40	1992	2012	
Yakovlev Yak-42	2006	2013	

== Financial indicators ==
In 2023, the net profit was 3.4 billion rubles. Revenue was 65.4 billion rubles. (40.8 billion rubles — domestic transportation, and 24 billion rubles — foreign flights).

In 2024, the net profit was 866 million rubles. Revenue was 79.1 billion rubles (49.6 billion rubles — domestic transportation, and 28.8 billion rubles — foreign flights).

== Accidents and incidents ==
- On 17 March 2007, UTair Flight 471, a Tupolev Tu-134, crash-landed at Samara, killing 7 people and injuring 26.
- On 2 July 2008, a Utair Mi-8 helicopter crashed in Yamal region, killing 9 and injuring 7 on board.
- On 16 January 2010, a Utair Boeing 737-500, registration VQ-BAC, overran the runway on landing at Vnukovo International Airport and was substantially damaged when the nosewheel collapsed.
- On 20 December 2011, a Utair Mil Mi-26T helicopter crashed in an oilfield in Western Siberia; one person was killed. Utair grounded all its Mil Mi-26T helicopters following this incident.
- On 2 April 2012, UTair Flight 120, an ATR 72-200, registration VP-BYZ, crashed approximately 1.4 nautical miles (2.6 km; 1.6 mi) from Roshchino International Airport serving Tyumen, Western Siberia, on a flight to Surgut International Airport. The aircraft was carrying 39 passengers and 4 crew. To date, 10 survivors with serious injuries and burns have been confirmed.
- On 4 July 2012, a helicopter operated by Utair for an oil and gas company crashed in a remote area about 4 kilometers from the runway of Lensk Airport near Lensk. The wreckage was found several hours later and three bodies were recovered, with the fourth person presumed killed. The cause was not immediately known, but Utair grounded all aircraft at Lensk Airport pending an investigation into the quality of fuel supply at the airport.
- On 4 August 2018, an MI-8 helicopter belonging to Utair crashed about 180 km from the town of Igarka, in Krasnoyarsk Territory, killing all 18 on board.
- On 1 September 2018, Utair Flight 579, a Boeing 737-800, registration VQ-BJI, on a flight from Vnukovo with 164 passengers and 6 crew, overran the runway and caught fire while landing in Sochi, injuring 18 people.
- On 9 February 2020, Utair Flight 595, a Boeing 737-500 on a domestic flight from Vnukovo International Airport (Moscow), crash-landed at Usinsk Airport, Russia, following a landing gear collapse. All 100 passengers and crew survived the accident.
- On 14 June 2024, Utair Flight 9706, an Antonov AN-26, crash-landed during approach at Utrenny Airport in foggy weather. Of the 41 people on board, 3 were injured.

== Literature ==
- Wragg, David W. (2007). The World's Major Airlines. Sutton: Sutton Publishing. p. 303. ISBN 9780750944816.
- Mills, Gordon (2016). The Airline Revolution: Economic analysis of airline performance and public policy. London: Routledge. p. 382. ISBN 9781317045311.
