= Krasnokutskyi arboretum =

Coordinates: 50°04′59″N 35°09′53″E

The Krasnokutskyi arboretum is one of the oldest arboreta of Ukraine. According to one version, the park was founded in 1793. The park was laid out by landowner Ivan Nazarovych Karazin, brother of the founder of Kharkiv University.

== Characteristic ==
The main compositional axis of the Krasnokutskyi arboretum is the watershed of the ravine, which gradually turns into a wide beam. There are ponds, dams, and streams at the bottom of the ravine. The slopes are formed by terraces. On the eastern side of the ravine, underground passages have been preserved since the monastic times.

In the park there are two ponds, four springs-wells with water. Red, pink, lemon, cream and white lotuses are planted on the upper pond. On the upper pond there is a small island built by the Karazins – "Island of Love".

In general, the researchers count three dozen representatives of the fauna in the park's collection, including hedgehogs, owls, sparrowhawks, nightingales, pigeons, starlings, titmice, thrushes and other birds.

== History ==
In 1654, three years after the founding of Krasnokutsk, the Cossacks founded the male Cossack Peter and Paul Monastery on the site where the arboretum would later become. They excavated two ponds and an extensive network of caves and underground passageways.

The monastery existed for more than a hundred years. The male Cossack Peter and Paul Monastery was closed by order of Catherine II. In 1768, she presented the monastery lands and buildings to Colonel Nazar Karazin for his services in the Russo-Turkish War of 1768–1774.

The son of Nazar Karazin, Ivan Karazin founded the arboretum in 1793, allocating 17 hectares of land for it. Most authors, referring to the publications of Ivan's son Ivan, believe that the Krasnokutskyi arboretum was established at the end of the 18th century. Although there are versions that the year of the foundation of the park is 1803.

After the revolution of 1917, the park came under the ownership of the Kharkiv Regional Agricultural Research Station.

The arboretum began to be revived in 1957. After the reorganization of the Krasnokutsk horticultural experimental station, which included the arboretum, its further restoration and expansion began. It received today's name – Krasnokutskyi arboretum.

== Sources ==
- Александрова В. Ювілей дендропарку: [Краснокутському дендропарку — 200 років] // Слобідський край. — 1993. — 13 лип.
- Бабак З. Перлина Слобожанщини: [Про дендропарк] // Маяк. — 2000. — 22 квіт.
- Кібкало В. З історії Краснокутського дендропарку // Промінь. — 1993. — 13, 16, 20, 23, 30 лип.
- Кульбаченко Г. Краснокутський дендропарк // Сільські вісті. — 1980. — 3 верес.
- Курдюк М. Контрасти Каразінського саду: [З історії району та сучасні проблеми охорони природи] // Сільські вісті. — 1989. — 18 серп.
- Мазница А. Жемчужина Харьковщины: [Дендропарк] // Зеркало недели. — 2003. — 28 июня. — С. 23.
- Пилипенко Л. Дендропарку — два столетия // Вечерний Харьков. — 1993. — 14 сент.
- Северова Л. Слово о прекрасном парке // Слобідський край. — 2003. — 24 мая.
- Тертишна Л. Нові сторінки історії дендропарку // Промінь. — 2001. — 2 жовт.
