= Utair Flight 579 =

2018 aircraft accident in Russia

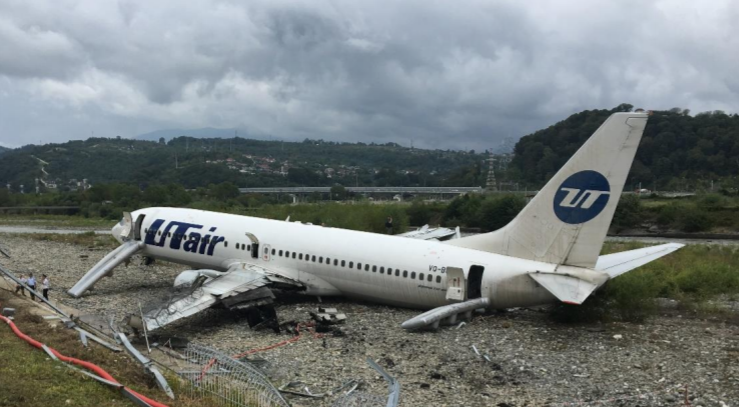
- The aircraft after overrunning the runway

Accident
- Date: 1 September 2018
- Summary: Runway overrun due to pilot error and windshear
- Site: Sochi International Airport, Sochi, Russia; 43.451935°N 39.960957°E
- Total fatalities: 1
- Total injuries: 18

Aircraft
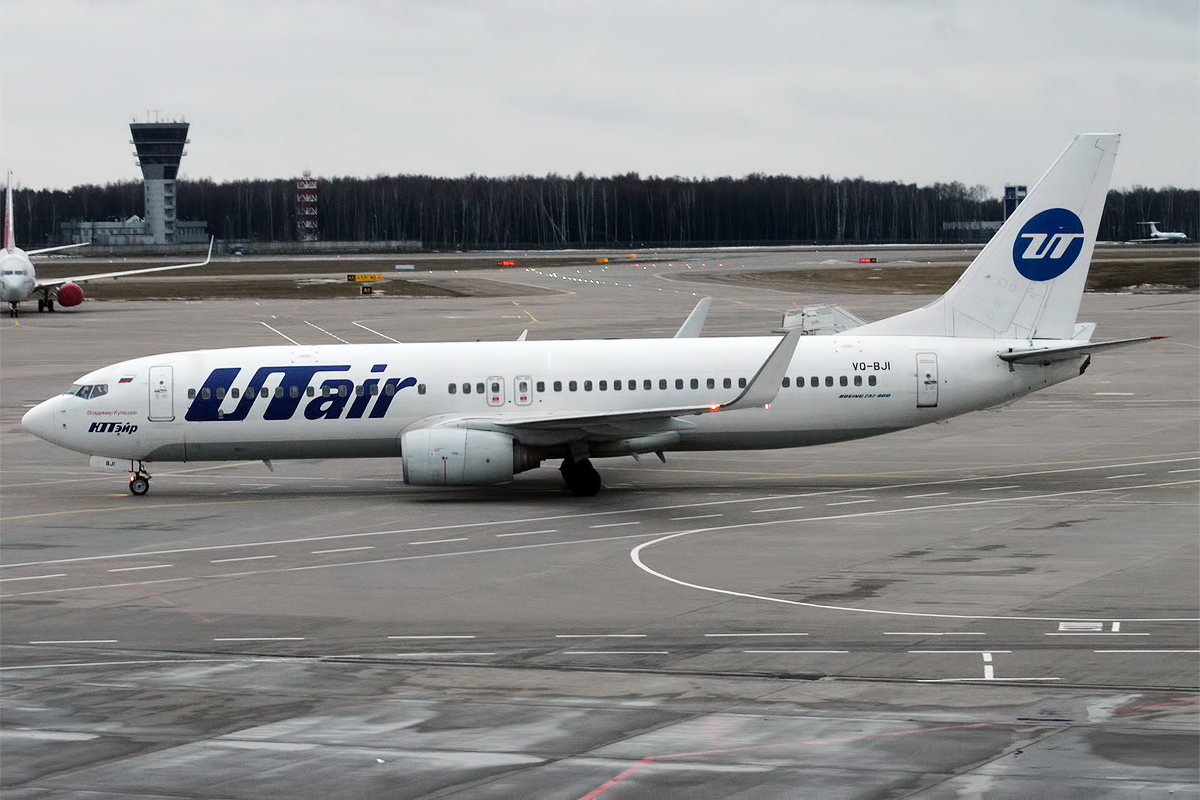
- VQ-BJI, the aircraft involved in the accident, seen in 2017
- Aircraft type: Boeing 737-8AS
- Operator: Utair
- IATA flight No.: UT579
- ICAO flight No.: UTA579
- Call sign: UTAIR 579
- Registration: VQ-BJI
- Flight origin: Vnukovo International Airport, Moscow, Russia
- Destination: Sochi International Airport, Sochi, Russia
- Occupants: 172
- Passengers: 166
- Crew: 6
- Fatalities: 0
- Injuries: 18
- Survivors: 172

Ground casualties
- Ground fatalities: 1

On 1 September 2018, Utair Flight 579, a Boeing 737-800 on a scheduled domestic flight from Moscow to Sochi, Russia, with 164 passengers and 6 crew, overran the runway and caught fire while landing at Sochi, injuring 18 occupants. One airport employee died of a heart attack.

== Aircraft and crew ==
The aircraft involved in the accident, manufactured in 2002 was a Boeing 737-8AS (Note: The aircraft was a Boeing 737-800 model; Boeing formerly assigned a unique code for each company that bought one of its aircraft, which was applied as a suffix to the model number; hence "737-8AS", designating a 737-800 ordered by Ryanair.) with serial number 29937 and Bermudan registration VQ-BJI. The aircraft had logged 45745 airframe hours and 23434 takeoff and landing cycles.

The 51-year-old captain Alexei Alekseevich Shnyrev had 14,000 flight hours, including 6,391 hours on the Boeing 737. The 53-year-old first officer Sergei Eduardovich Ivanov had 12,277 flight hours, with 5,147 of them on the Boeing 737. Both pilots were type rated on both the Boeing 737 Classic and Next Generation variants and had completed crew resource management training. The first officer had also undergone windshear training in May 2018.

== Accident ==
The flight departed from Vnukovo Airport at 12:30 am local time with 166 passengers and six crew. The flight crew aborted the first two approaches to Sochi before committing to a third that resulted in the overrun. The aircraft touched down at 2:57 am and overran runway 06, came to rest on the bed of the Mzymta River and caught fire, prompting an evacuation.

Eighteen occupants were injured; injuries included burns and carbon monoxide poisoning. Transportation Minister Yevgeny Dietrich confirmed that an airport employee died of a heart attack during the emergency response.

Thunderstorms were reported over Sochi at the time of the accident. The aircraft received damage to its belly, wings and engines. The airport operator reported that the fire was extinguished within eight minutes.

== Investigation ==
An accident investigation was launched by the Interstate Aviation Committee (IAC) of Russia. Two days after the crash on 3 September, the IAC reported that the flight recorders had been recovered from the aircraft, the data were retrieved successfully and would be analyzed. The committee completed examination of the accident site and was making preparations for moving the aircraft. The United States National Transportation Safety Board, representing the State of Design and State of Manufacture of the aircraft, and the United Kingdom's Air Accidents Investigation Branch, representing the State of Registry, were invited to participate in the investigation.

The Investigative Committee of Russia also launched a probe into the crash, with a Southern Transport Department official stating that "a criminal investigation has been opened into the emergency landing ... on suspicion of inadequate services with a risk to clients' health."

The IAC released a preliminary report on 6 November 2018.

On 12 December 2019, the IAC released their final report on the accident. The cause of the accident was the flight crew ignoring repetitive windshear warnings when the aircraft experienced low-level horizontal windshear and the crew's decision to land on the runway when its conditions at the time of the accident prohibited doing so. Contributing factors included violation of standard operation procedures, improper use of the autopilot, poor crew resource management training, and late deployment of the spoilers.

== See also ==
- Runway excursion
- Pegasus Airlines Flight 2193
- Pegasus Airlines Flight 8622
