= Bohodukhiv =

City in Kharkiv Oblast, Ukraine

Bohodukhiv Богодухів
- City
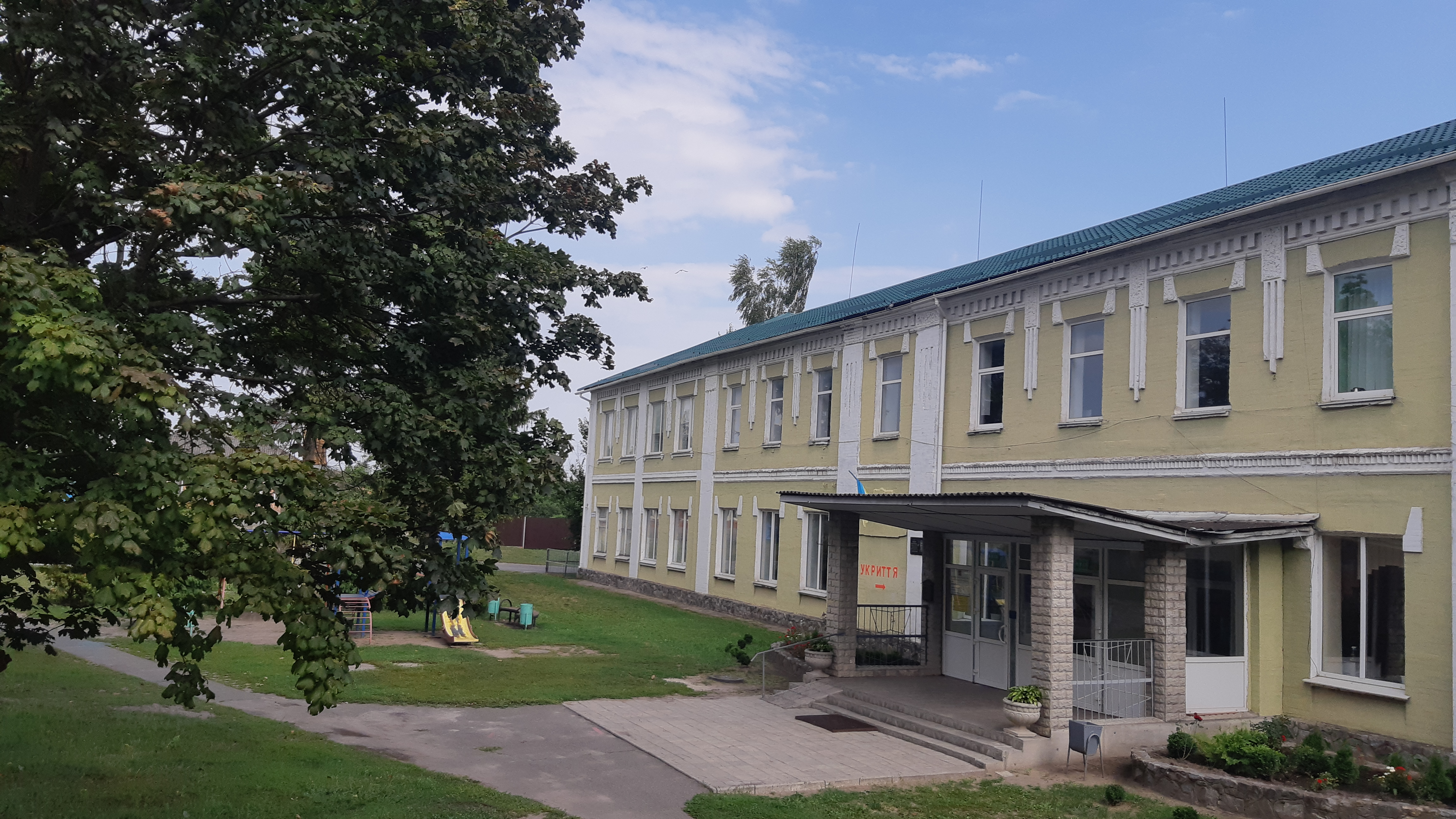
- Lyceum No. 2 in Bohodukhiv

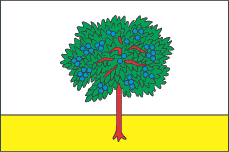
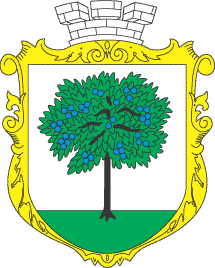
- Flag Coat of arms
- Interactive map of Bohodukhiv
- Location of Bohodukhiv Bohodukhiv (Kharkiv Oblast)
- Coordinates: 50°9′42″N 35°31′32″E
- Country: Ukraine
- Oblast: Kharkiv Oblast
- Raion: Bohodukhiv Raion
- Hromada: Bohodukhiv urban hromada
- Founded: 1662

Area
  - Total: 1,623 km^{2} (627 sq mi)

Population (2022)
  - Total: 14,624
  - Density: 9.010/km^{2} (23.34/sq mi)
- Time zone: UTC+2 (EET)
  - Summer (DST): UTC+3 (EEST)
- Postal code: 62100-62109

Bohodukhiv (Ukrainian: Богодухів [boɦoˈduxiu̯]; Russian: Богодухов, romanized: Bogodukhov) is a city in Kharkiv Oblast, eastern Ukraine. It is the administrative centre of Bohodukhiv Raion. Bohodukhiv hosts the administration of Bohodukhiv urban hromada, one of the hromadas of Ukraine. Current population: 14,624 (2022 estimate).

== History ==
A defensive fortification against the Tatars existed on the location during the 16th century. The settlement was founded in 1662 as a small sloboda and Bogodukhov ostrog by Ukrainian Cossacks under command of otaman Tymofiy Krysa. It has been a town since 1681. In 1709, at the time of the Russo-Swedish War, it was taken by Menshikov and tsarevich Alexius.

After April 1780 it was the administrative centre of Bogodukhov uyezd in Kharkov Governorate of the Russian Empire. A cathedral was built in 1793.

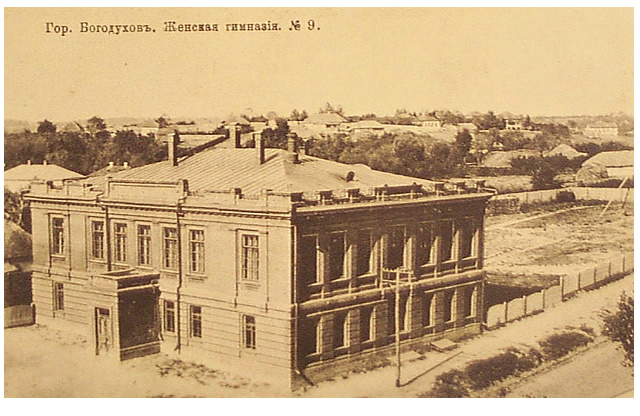
A school in the early 20th century

In December 1918 the city was a site of battles between the Zaporozhian Corps and Bolsheviks. During the Ukrainian War of Independence, from 1917 to 1920, it passed between various factions. Afterwards it was administratively part of the Kharkiv Governorate of Ukraine. Soviet times, saw the development of local industry and education. In 1932 the city's population reached 16,000. A local newspaper has been published in Bohodukhiv since February 1930.

During World War II, the city was occupied by the German Army from 16 October 1941 to 17 February 1943 and again from 11 March to 7 August 1943. It was liberated by 1st Tank Army. In 1944, a dairy factory was built in Bohodukhiv. In 1950 the city had three secondary schools, five seven-year schools, two primary schools and a vocational school. In 1965, a medical college was opened.

The main branch of the economy was the food industry.

== Geography ==
Bohodukhiv stands on the river Merlo, a tributary of Vorskla. Geologically, its territory is part of the Central Upland.

=== Climate ===
Climate data for Bohodukhiv (1981–2010)
Month	Jan	Feb	Mar	Apr	May	Jun	Jul	Aug	Sep	Oct	Nov	Dec	Year
Mean daily maximum °C (°F)	−2.8 (27.0)	−2.2 (28.0)	3.9 (39.0)	13.8 (56.8)	20.7 (69.3)	24.0 (75.2)	26.1 (79.0)	25.6 (78.1)	19.2 (66.6)	11.7 (53.1)	3.1 (37.6)	−1.7 (28.9)	11.8 (53.2)
Daily mean °C (°F)	−5.3 (22.5)	−5.2 (22.6)	0.1 (32.2)	8.5 (47.3)	14.9 (58.8)	18.3 (64.9)	20.3 (68.5)	19.5 (67.1)	13.8 (56.8)	7.2 (45.0)	0.4 (32.7)	−4.1 (24.6)	7.4 (45.3)
Mean daily minimum °C (°F)	−7.8 (18.0)	−8.1 (17.4)	−3.1 (26.4)	3.9 (39.0)	9.4 (48.9)	13.0 (55.4)	14.9 (58.8)	13.9 (57.0)	9.1 (48.4)	3.6 (38.5)	−2.1 (28.2)	−6.6 (20.1)	3.3 (37.9)
Average precipitation mm (inches)	36.0 (1.42)	32.2 (1.27)	31.8 (1.25)	37.1 (1.46)	53.7 (2.11)	73.9 (2.91)	64.2 (2.53)	41.0 (1.61)	51.3 (2.02)	45.7 (1.80)	38.4 (1.51)	35.1 (1.38)	540.4 (21.28)
Average precipitation days (≥ 1.0 mm)	8.2	7.4	7.9	6.7	7.4	9.5	8.0	5.6	7.2	6.2	7.7	8.1	89.9
Average relative humidity (%)	86.1	82.9	78.0	66.3	61.4	67.7	68.1	64.0	71.0	78.5	86.4	87.3	74.8
Source: World Meteorological Organization

== Demographics ==
Historical population
Year	Pop.	±%
1860	10,522	—
1897	11,928	+13.4%
1989	18,962	+59.0%
2013	15,797	−16.7%

As of the 2001 Ukrainian census, the settlement had a population of 18,045 inhabitants, making it the twelfth-largest city in the Kharkiv Oblast. The ethnic composition was as follows:

Ethnic groups in Bohodukhiv
	percent
Ukrainians	91.13%
Russians	6.44%
Belarusians	0.47%
Armenians	0.28%
others	0.31%

== Transport ==
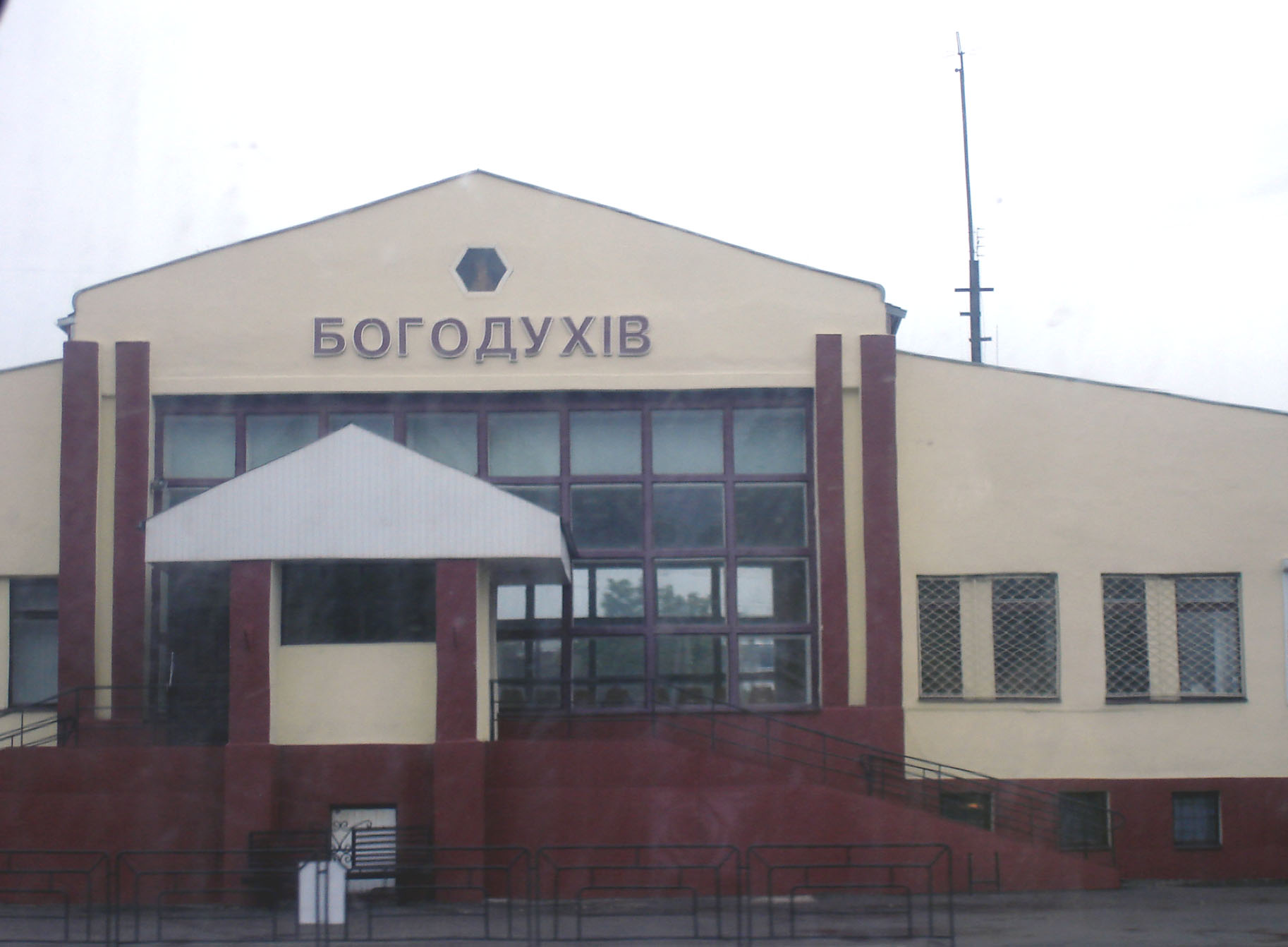
Bohodukhiv railway station

Bohodukhiv railway station on the Southern railway is located here since 1878 at around 50°10′N 35°31′E.

== Notable people ==
- Viktor Ivchenko (1912-1972), Ukrainian-Soviet film director
- Oleksandr Kikhtenko (born 1956), retired general and former governor of the Donetsk Oblast
- Andriy Reva (born 1966), Ukrainian politician (European Solidarity), who served as the Minister of Social Policy between 2016 and 2019

== Twin towns – sister cities ==
Bohodukhiv is twinned with:

- Boyertown, United States
