= List of American death metal bands =

This is a list of United States Death Metal (USDM) bands that were originally formed in the United States. Death metal is an extreme subgenre of heavy metal music. It typically employs heavily distorted guitars, tremolo picking, deep growling vocals, blast beat drumming, minor keys or atonality, and complex song structures with multiple tempo changes.

== A ==
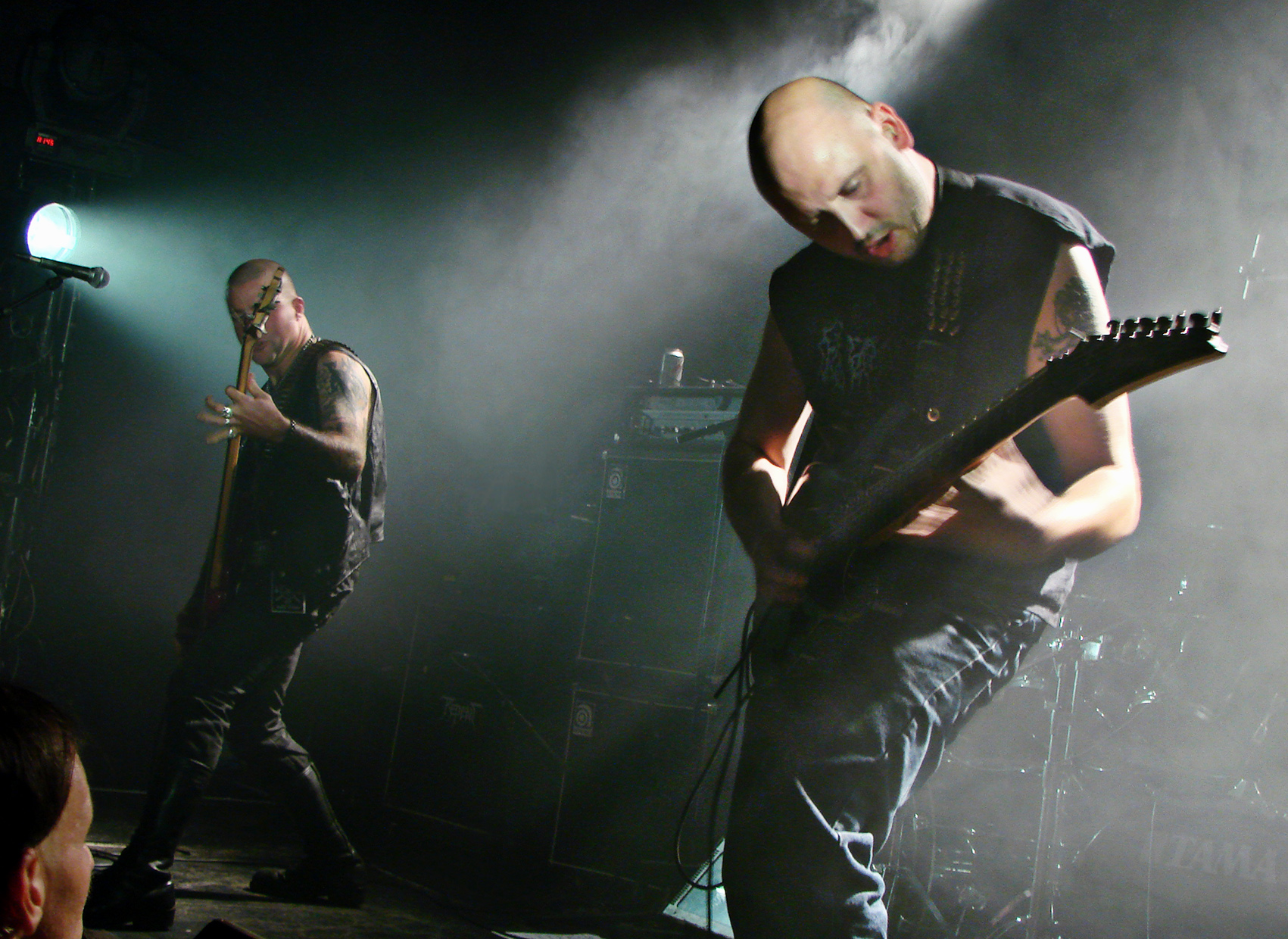
Angelcorpse performing in Paris, France, on April 28, 2008

- Abscess
- The Absence
- Abysmal Dawn
- Acheron
- Acid Witch
- Agoraphobic Nosebleed
- Aletheian
- Angelcorpse
- Animosity
- Arsis
- Assück
- Atheist
- Autopsy

== B ==
- Becoming the Archetype
- Between the Buried and Me
- Beyond the Sixth Seal
- Black Crown Initiate
- The Black Dahlia Murder
- Bloodsoaked
- Born of Osiris
- Brain Drill
- Brodequin
- Broken Hope
- Brujeria
- Brutal Truth
- Brutality

== C ==
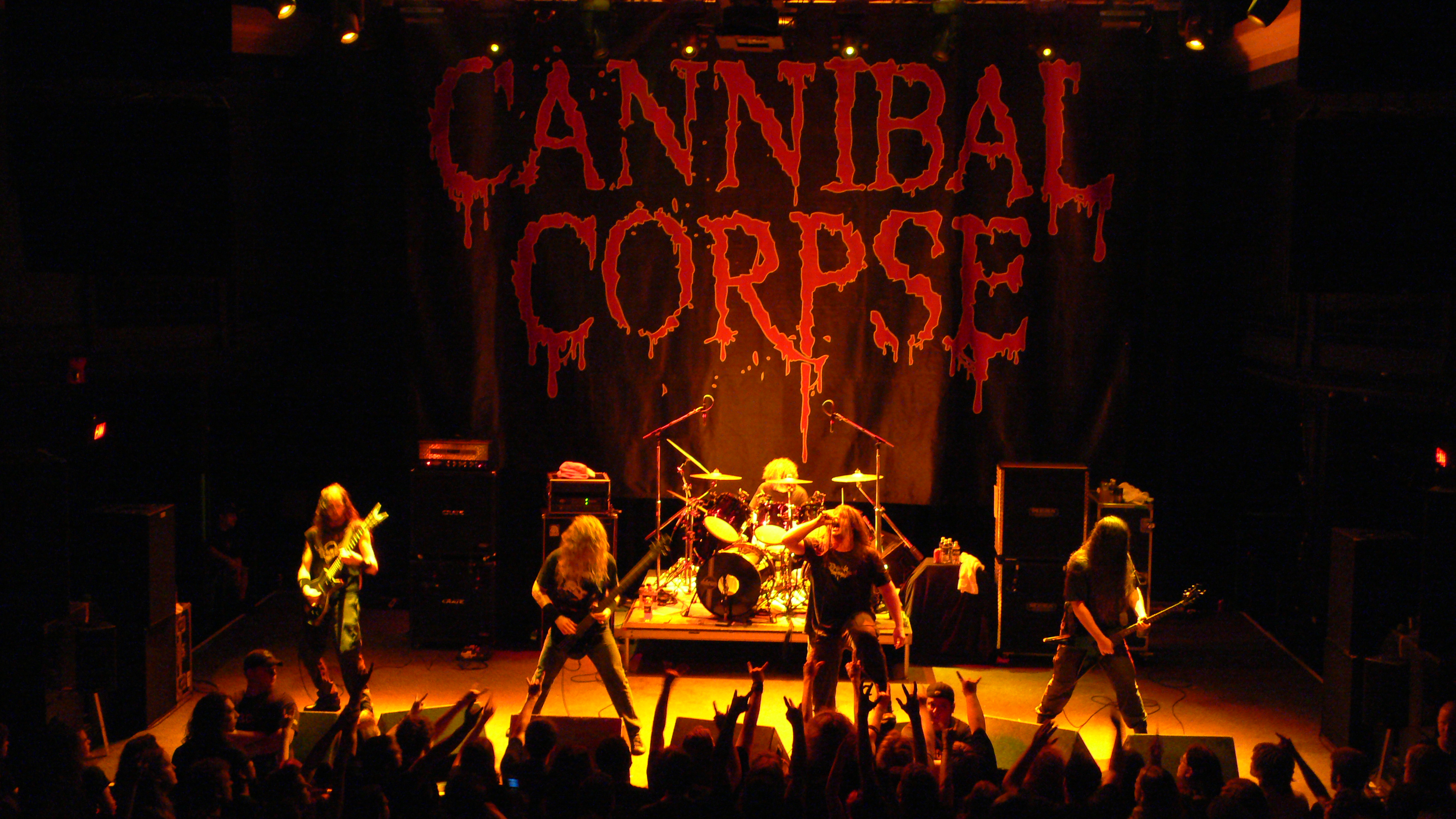
Cannibal Corpse playing at the 9:30 Club in Washington DC on October 3, 2007

- Caninus
- Cannibal Corpse
- Cannabis Corpse
- Capharnaum
- Cattle Decapitation
- Cephalic Carnage
- Circle of Dead Children
- Council of the Fallen
- The County Medical Examiners
- Crimson Thorn
- Cynic

== D ==
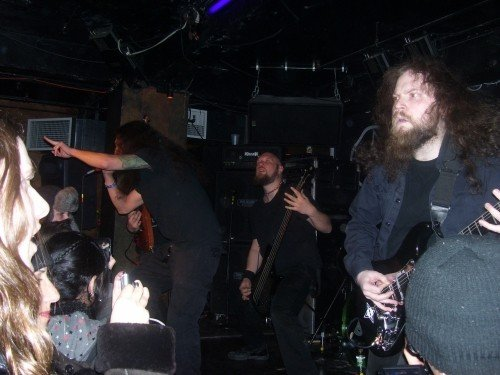
Dååth live in New York City on February 2, 2007

- Dååth
- Daylight Dies
- Death
- Deceased
- Decrepit Birth
- Deeds of Flesh
- Deicide
- Demiricous
- Demolition Hammer
- Dethklok
- Deus Invictus
- Devourment
- Diabolic
- Dim Mak
- Disgorge
- Disincarnate
- Diskreet
- Divine Empire
- Divine Heresy
- Dr. Shrinker
- Dying Fetus

== E ==
- Elysia
- Embalmer
- Embodyment
- Epidemic
- Epoch of Unlight
- Evoken
- Exhumed

== F ==
- The Faceless
- From a Second Story Window
- Fuming Mouth
- The Funeral Pyre
- Funerus

== G ==
- Gatecreeper
- Ghoul
- Glass Casket
- Goatlord
- Goatwhore
- God Forbid
- Goreaphobia
- Graves of Valor

== H ==
- Hate Eternal
- Hatebeak
- Hibernus Mortis

== I ==
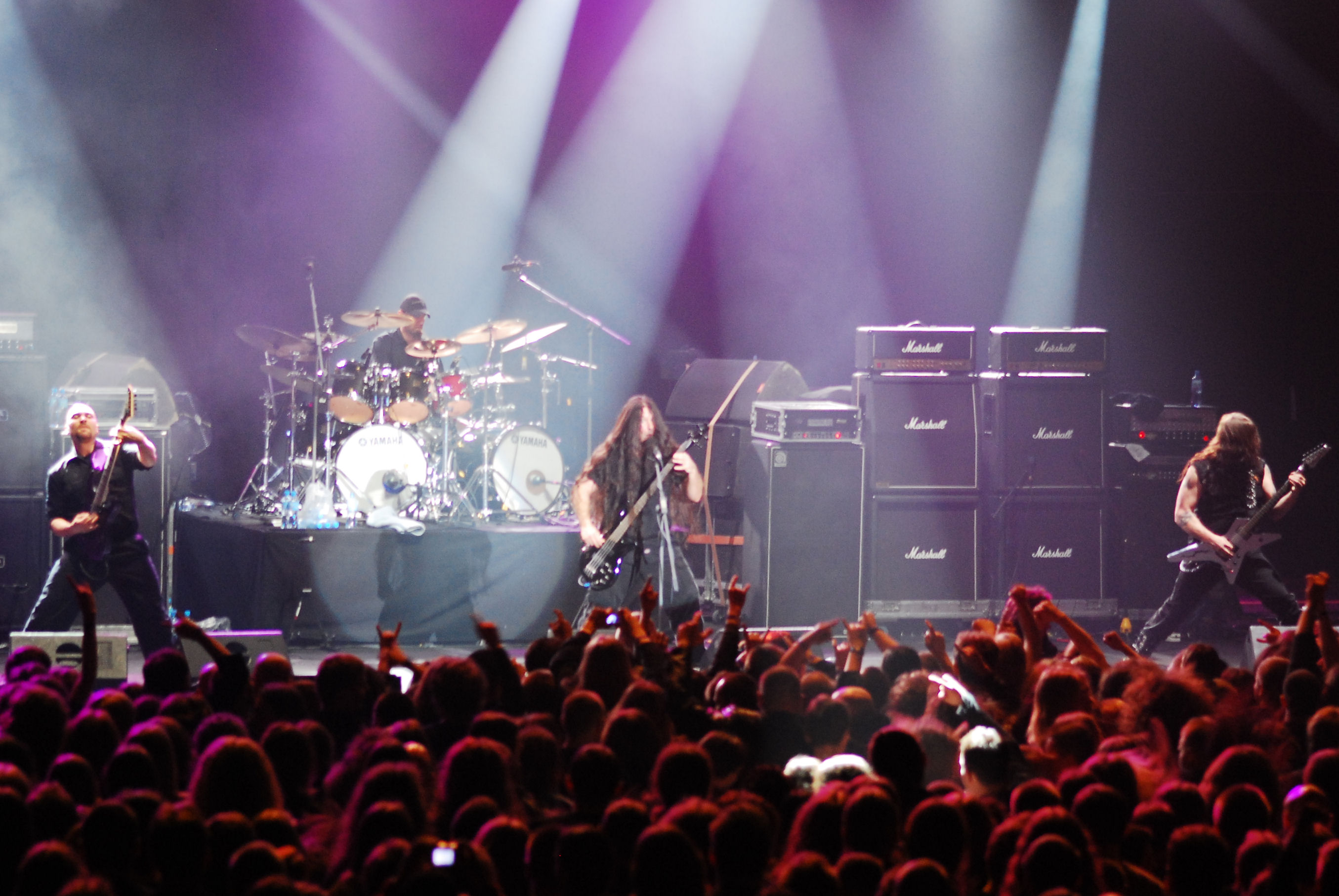
Immolation at Metalmania in 2008

- Immolation
- Impaled
- Impending Doom
- Impetigo
- Incantation
- Internal Bleeding
- Into the Moat

== J ==
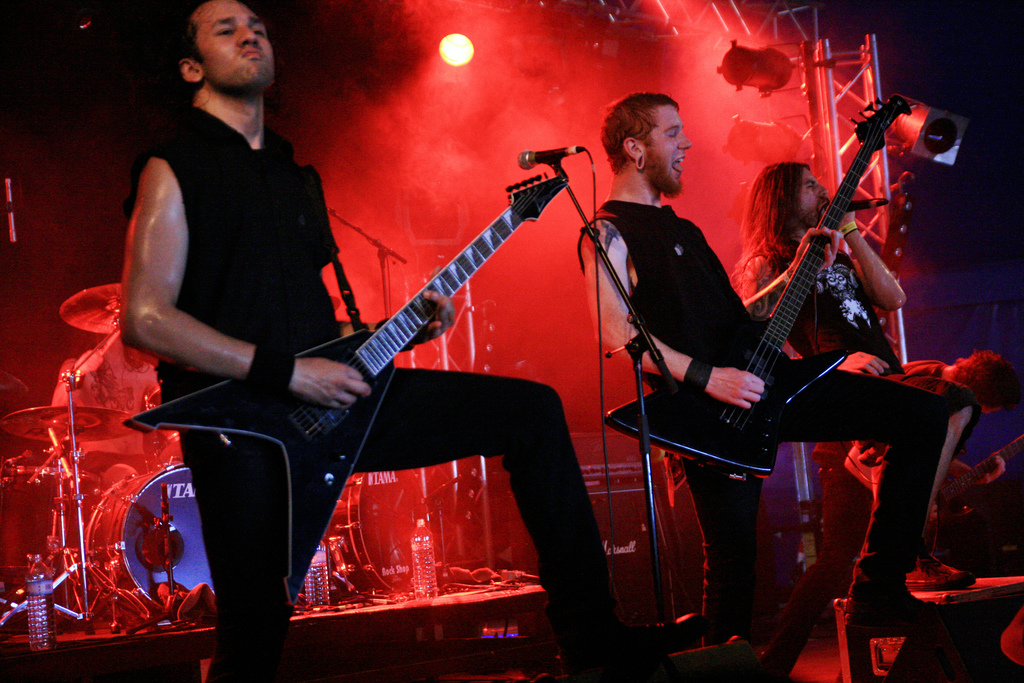
Job for a Cowboy performing at 2008's Hellfest, France

- Job for a Cowboy
- Jungle Rot

== K ==
- Kaos Rising
- Killing Addiction
- Killing Moon
- Knights of the Abyss

== L ==
- Landmine Marathon

== M ==
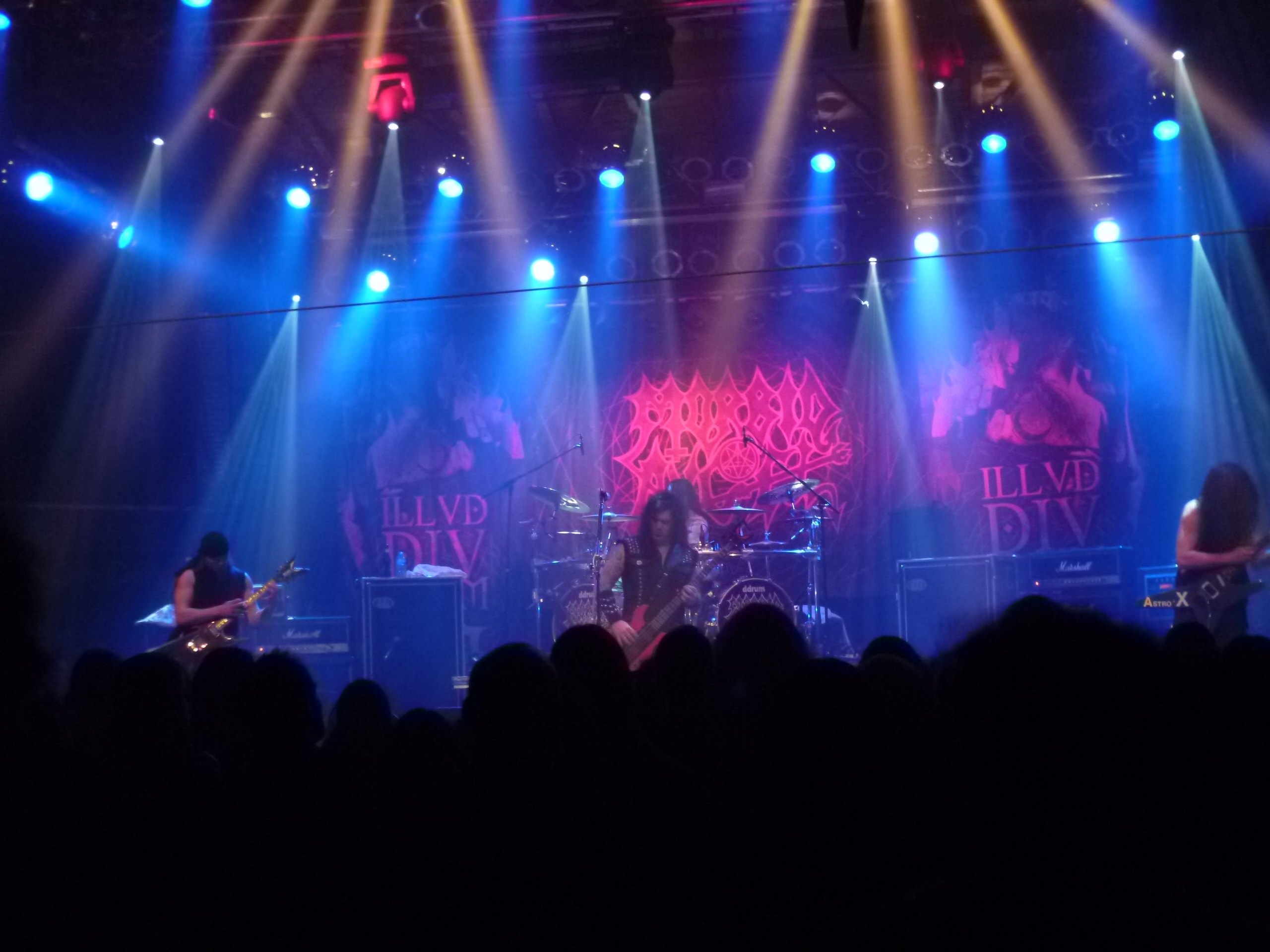
Morbid Angel live in 2011

- Macabre
- Malevolent Creation
- Malignancy
- The Mandrake
- Massacre
- Master
- Misery Index
- Molotov Solution
- Monstrosity
- Morbid Angel
- Morbid Saint
- Morgion
- Mortal Decay
- Mortician
- Mutiny Within

== N ==
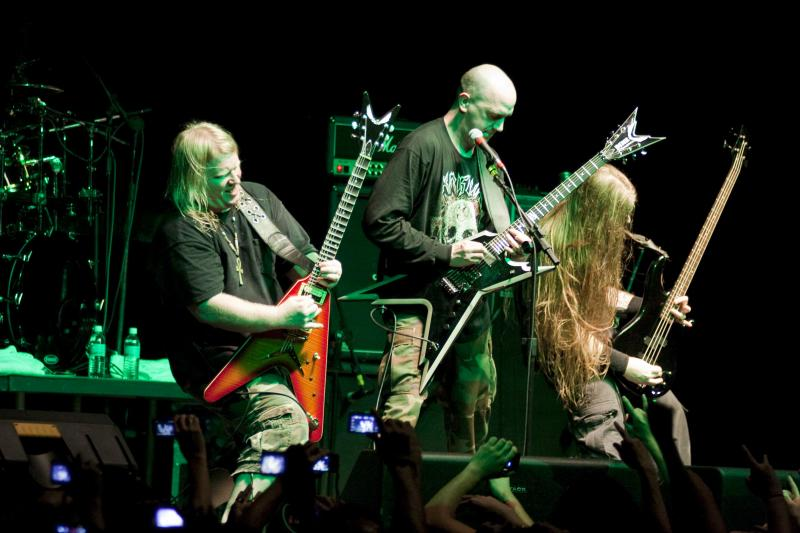
Nile performing at Santana Hall in 2010. From left to right: Karl Sanders, Dallas Toler-Wade and Chris Lollis.

- Necare
- Necrophagia
- Nile
- Nocturnus
- Novembers Doom
- Nuclear Death

== O ==
- Obituary
- Oblivion
- Oceano
- Odious Mortem
- Oppressor
- Opprobrium
- Order from Chaos
- Order of Ennead
- Origin

== P ==
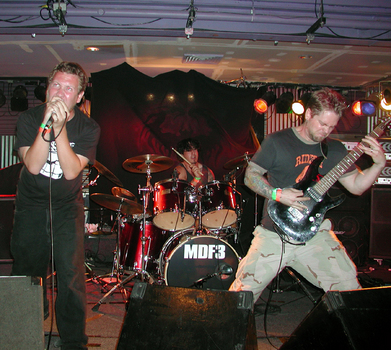
Pig Destroyer playing at Maryland Deathfest III in 2005

- Pathology
- Paths of Possession
- Pig Destroyer
- Possessed

== R ==
- The Red Chord
- The Red Death
- Repulsion
- Revocation
- Ripping Corpse

== S ==
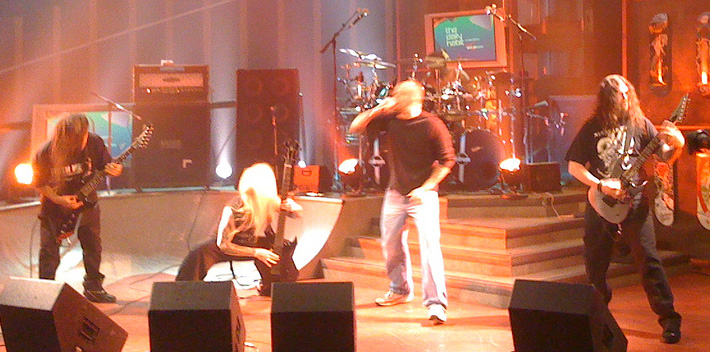
Suffocation jamming in 2010

- Sadistic Intent
- Sadus
- Sculptured
- Six Feet Under
- Skinless
- Solstice
- Sons of Azrael
- Soul Embraced
- Stovokor
- Success Will Write Apocalypse Across the Sky
- Suffocation

== T ==
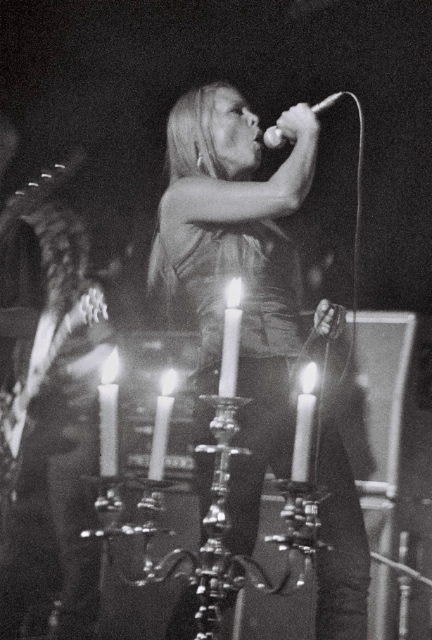
Runhild Gammelsæter of Thorr's Hammer performing at Birmingham in 2009

- Terrorizer
- Thorr's Hammer
- Through the Eyes of the Dead
- Trap Them

== V ==
- Vile
- Vital Remains
- Voodoo Gods

== W ==
- Waking the Cadaver
- Winter
- Withered
- Woe of Tyrants
- World Under Blood
- Wretched

== See also ==
- List of death metal bands
