= USDM =

USDM may refer to:

- Sammarinese Union of Moderates
- United States Death Metal
- United States domestic market
- Utrenny Airport, ICAO code USDM
