= Consume the Forsaken =

Studio album by Disgorge
- Released: May 7, 2002
- Recorded: February 2002
- Genre: Brutal death metal
- Length: 31:42
- Label: Unique Leader
- Producers: Chris Djuricic, Disgorge

Disgorge chronology
She Lay Gutted (1999)	Consume the Forsaken (2002)	Parallels of Infinite Torture (2005)

Consume the Forsaken is the third studio album by American death metal band Disgorge. It is their only album with vocalist A.J. Magana.

Drummer Ricky Myers compared it positively to their previous album: "Musicianship... it’s a lot better, it’s a lot faster too. More focussed [sic] lyricwise and musicwise. And the production is way better too."

== Track listing ==
1. "Demise of the Trinity" — 3:23
2. "Perverse Manifestation" — 4:28
3. "Manipulation of Faith" — 3:11
4. "Consecrating the Reviled" — 2:35
5. "Indulging Dismemberment of a Mutilating Breed" — 2:53
6. "Consume the Forsaken" — 3:38
7. "Dissecting thee Apostles" — 3:05
8. "Denied Existence" — 3:44
9. "Divine Suffering" — 4:45
