= She Lay Gutted =

Studio album by Disgorge
- Released: November 9, 1999
- Genre: Brutal death metal
- Length: 24:52
- Label: Unique Leader Records; Crash Music Inc.

Disgorge chronology
Cranial Impalement (1998)	She Lay Gutted (1999)	Consume the Forsaken (2002)

Professional ratings
Review scores
Source	Rating
Allmusic	link

She Lay Gutted is the second studio album by American death metal band Disgorge. It was originally released by Unique Leader Records on November 9, 1999 and re-released on February 21, 2006 by Crash Music Inc. Additional backing vocals on the album are performed by Erik Lindmark of Deeds of Flesh.

== Reception ==
Stewart Mason of AllMusic gave the album a weak review, saying "the album overall doesn't compare well to the best death metal, lacking both the speed and the technical polish that this brand of metal requires to be truly effective. Add to this the fact that the songs themselves are reheated Cannibal Corpse chops with dopey, clichéd titles like "Sodomize the Bleeding" and "Womb Full of Scabs" and it's clear that She Lay Gutted is the work of a band that is so far merely going through the required motions for their chosen style."

== Track listing ==
1. "Revelations XVIII" – 3:31
2. "She Lay Gutted" – 2:40
3. "Exhuming the Disemboweled" – 3:01
4. "Compost Devourment" – 1:52
5. "Sodomize the Bleeding" – 3:05
6. "False Conception" – 2:50
7. "Womb Full of Scabs" – 2:24
8. "Disfigured Catacombs" – 2:37
9. "Purifying the Cavity" – 2:50
