= Quantum Catastrophe =

Studio album by Brain Drill
- Released: May 11, 2010
- Recorded: December 2009 – January 2010 at Castle Ultimate Studios in Oakland, California, United States
- Genre: Technical death metal
- Length: 41:49
- Label: Metal Blade
- Producer: Brain Drill, Zach Ohren

Brain Drill chronology
Apocalyptic Feasting (2008)	Quantum Catastrophe (2010)

Quantum Catastrophe is the second studio album by American technical death metal band Brain Drill, released through Metal Blade on May 11, 2010. After the release of their debut album Apocalyptic Feasting in February 2008, the band almost broke up with the departure of drummer Marco Pitruzzella and bassist Jeff Hughell in March 2008. The remaining members, guitarist Dylan Ruskin and vocalist Steve Rathjen decided to continue with the band, and from May to September 2008, auditioned for bassists and drummers. In September 2008, the band announced drummer Joe Bondra and bassist Ivan Munguia as replacements. Bondra was replaced by drummer Ron Casey and this new lineup began work on the album in August 2009. Quantum Catastrophe was recorded between December 2009 and January 2010 at Castle Ultimate Studios in Oakland, California with co-producer Zach Ohren (Suffocation, Decrepit Birth, All Shall Perish), who also engineered and mastered the album along with the band. It is the only album to feature bassist Ivan Munguia and drummer Ron Casey. It is also the last album to feature vocalist Steve Rathjen

Although Quantum Catastrophe is not a concept album, it's loosely based on the 2012 phenomenon. The album's lyrics were written by vocalist Steve Rathjen, inspired by themes such as "Universal decimation (black holes, galactic cosmic radiation), pandemic disease and zombie re-awakenings." Rathjen further explained that "mankind is entering an age of mass speculation as foreseen by numerous ancient cultures. Space to all humanity still primarily remains a mystery even in our days of immense technological advancements. We know this void is filled with infinite extremities which could occur at any instant; easily decimating all habitations. We also know our planet has fulfilled these mass extinctions time and again centuries in the past. The question which remains, are we due for another apocalyptic transition?" Musically, Brain Drill continues to draw the attention of music critics with its over-the-top virtuosity. Allmusic stated that Quantum Catastrophe is "in its own vicious, bombastic, skullcrushing way, [...] a celebration of virtuosity." In contrast, The A.V. Club defined the album as "an incoherent mess of doodly-doo," and pointed out that "the band's survival is a bad thing."

== Track listing ==
All songs written and composed by Steve Rathjen, Dylan Ruskin, except where noted.

No.	Title	Length
1.	"Obliteration Untold"	3:46
2.	"Beyond Bludgeoned"	4:16
3.	"Awaiting Imminent Destruction" (Ivan Munguia, Rathjen, Ruskin)	2:51
4.	"Nemesis of Neglect"	4:28
5.	"Entity of Extinction"	3:46
6.	"Mercy to None" (Munguia, Rathjen, Ruskin)	3:14
7.	"Monumental Failure"	3:25
8.	"Quantum Catastrophe"	16:03
Total length:		41:49

== Personnel ==
- Steve Rathjen – vocals, lyricist, composer
- Dylan Ruskin – bass, guitar, lyricist, composer
- Ivan Munguia – bass, guitar, composer
- Ron Casey – drums
- Zach Ohren – engineer, mastering, mixing, producer
- Pär Olofsson – cover art
- Brian Ames – layout
