= Abandon All Hope =

Abandon All Hope may refer to:

== Film and television ==
- "Abandon All Hope...", an episode on the fifth season of the American television show Supernatural
- Lasciate ogni speranza (transl. Abandon all hope), 1937 Italian comedy film

== Music ==
- "Abandon All Hope", a 1997 song by Mentallo and the Fixer from Burnt Beyond Recognition
- "Abandon All Hope", a 2003 song by Dying Fetus from Stop at Nothing
- "Abandon All Hope", a 2014 song by Vader from Tibi et Igni
- Abandon All Hope, a 2018 album by Engel

== See also ==
- Abandon all hope, ye who enter here, a quote from the Divine Comedy
