= Nucleus (Deeds of Flesh album) =

Studio album by Deeds of Flesh
- Released: December 11, 2020
- Studio: Carnivale Nocturnal, House of Grind
- Genre: Technical death metal
- Length: 40:34
- Label: Unique Leader

Deeds of Flesh chronology
Portals to Canaan (2013)	Nucleus (2020)

Professional ratings
Review scores
Source	Rating
Decibel	favorable
Blabbermouth.net	8.5/10

Nucleus is the ninth studio album by Californian death metal band Deeds of Flesh. It was released on December 11, 2020, on Unique Leader Records. This is the band's first album not to feature Erik Lindmark, following his death in 2018, although material written by him is featured on the album. To honor him, singers of several established death metal bands were featured as guest vocalists.

== Track listing ==
No.	Title	Length
1.	"Odyssey"	3:27
2.	"Alyen Scourge"	5:05
3.	"Ascension Vortex" (feat. Bill Robinson, Obie Flett and Anthony Trapani)	4:29
4.	"Catacombs of the Monolith" (feat. Luc Lemay)	5:08
5.	"Ethereal Ancestors" (feat. George "Corpsegrinder" Fisher)	4:28
6.	"Nucleus" (feat. John Gallagher)	4:56
7.	"Races Conjoined" (feat. Frank Mullen, Matti Way and Jon Zig)	5:17
8.	"Terror" (feat. Dusty Boisjolie and Robbe Kok)	6:00
9.	"Onward"	1:44
Total length:		40:34

== Personnel ==
- Jacoby Kingston – vocals
- Erik Lindmark – guitars
- Craig Peters – guitars, programming
- Ivan Munguia – bass
- Darren Cesca – drums
