= Of What's to Come =

Studio album by Deeds of Flesh
- Released: November 18, 2008
- Genre: Technical death metal
- Length: 39:21
- Label: Unique Leader
- Producer: Deeds of Flesh

Deeds of Flesh chronology
Crown of Souls (2005)	Of What's to Come (2008)	Portals to Canaan (2013)

Of What's To Come is the seventh studio album by death metal band Deeds of Flesh, released in 2008. The last song is a re-recording from their second album, Inbreeding the Anthropophagi. This album is also the first on which the band has utilized guitar solos. Whereas the lyrical themes on previous albums had been more focused on violent and gore-based stories, this album showcases a change in direction to science fiction, with each song (save for the final track), detailing an extremely complex story about Mankind's interactions with an Ancient space-race which wishes to harvest life (or "Virvum"). The story was continued on the band's next album, Portals to Canaan, which was released in 2013.

It was rated a 69 out of 100 by MetalReviews.com.

== Track listing ==
No.	Title	Length
1.	"Waters of Space"	5:30
2.	"Eradication Pods"	3:34
3.	"Unearthly Invent"	3:32
4.	"Of What's to Come"	5:56
5.	"Virvum"	3:16
6.	"Century of the Vital"	5:00
7.	"Harvest Temples"	4:05
8.	"Dawn of the Next"	4:04
9.	"Infecting them with Falsehood"	4:26
Total length:		39:21

== Credits ==
- Erik Lindmark - Guitar, vocals
- Sean Southern - Guitar
- Erlend Caspersen - Bass
- Mike Hamilton - Drums
