= Cranial Impalement =

Studio album by Disgorge
- Released: January 14, 1998
- Recorded: 1995–1996
- Genre: Brutal death metal
- Length: 24:07
- Label: Extremities; Unique Leader (reissue)

Disgorge chronology
| Cranial Impalement (1998) | She Lay Gutted (1999) |

Cranial Impalement is the debut studio album by American death metal band Disgorge. It was released by Extremities Records in January 14, 1998 and re-released on August 12, 2008 by Unique Leader Records.

== Background and recording ==
The album's first four tracks were recorded in 1996 while its last four tracks were recorded in 1995 (and originally appeared on the band's 1995 demo tape).

== Track listing ==
1. "Deranged Epidemic" — 3:07
2. "Atonement" — 3:17
3. "Cognitive Lust of Mutilation"* — 2:41
4. "Period of Agony" — 3:15
5. "Cranial Impalement" — 3:02
6. "Penetrate the Unfledged" — 2:57
7. "Malodorous Oblation" — 2:42
8. "Carnally Decimated" — 2:49
9. "Burble" — 0:15
- Physical copies of the release list this track as “Cognative [sic] Lust of Mutilation”
