= Kaos Rising =

American band

- Origin: Chicago, United States
- Genres: Death metal, thrash metal
- Years active: 1999 - 2006
- Labels: Jet Speed Records; Break The Surface Music
- Past members: Casey Loving; Scot Johnson; Chad Woods; Jason Jaros; Matt Brennan

Kaos Rising is a death metal, or thrash metal, band from Chicago, Illinois. Formed in late 1999, they soon recorded their first demo, entitled "Wiped Away". This demo attracted the attention of California's Jet Speed Records, and in the winter of 2001, they recorded their first full-length album, Welcome To The Violence, which was released in 2002/2003. Following this release, they opened for many major bands such as Fear Factory, Lamb of God, Shadows Fall, Hatebreed, and others. After much touring in 2004, they recorded their second album, Cold Years To Come, which was released in October/November 2005 by Break The Surface Music. Whereas Welcome To The Violence came across as a more experimental album, with few songs that could be considered extremely fast, Cold Years To Come has a much faster, old-school thrash feel to it, and certainly contains a higher degree of musical quality. According to their MySpace page, they broke up sometime in early 2006.

Self-described as "Hardcore Stomping Death Groove", which is a quite accurate description of their music, their major influences seem to be Machine Head, Soulfly, and Dying Fetus, although none of these are exact soundalikes.

== Members ==
- Vocals- Casey Loving
- Guitar- Scot Johnson
- Bass- Chad Woods
- Drums- Jason Jaros
- Sampler- Lucas Theroux

== Former members ==
- Greg Delange(Guitar on Welcome To The Violence)
- Bryan (Bass on Welcome To The Violence)
- Matt Brennan (Drums)

== Releases ==
- Wiped Away (2000) (Demo)
- Welcome To The Violence (2002/2003)
- Cold Years To Come (2005)
