= Mark of the Legion =

Studio album by Deeds of Flesh
- Released: August 28, 2001
- Genre: Brutal death metal
- Length: 41:34
- Label: Unique Leader Records

Deeds of Flesh chronology
Path of the Weakening (1999)	Mark of the Legion (2001)	Reduced to Ashes (2003)

Mark of the Legion is the fourth studio release by the American brutal death metal band Deeds of Flesh. It was released in 2001.

Brian Meloon of Chronicles of Chaos rated it a 7 out of 10.

== Track listing ==
No.	Title	Length
1.	"Cleansed by Fire"	4:29
2.	"An Eternity of Feasting and Brawling"	4:19
3.	"Mark of the Legion"	5:22
4.	"Spewing the Profligacy"	4:39
5.	"Fulfilled in Warfare"	3:33
6.	"Contest of Wills"	3:50
7.	"Master of Murder"	4:22
8.	"Ideal Genocide"	5:37
9.	"Drink the Blood"	5:23
Total length:		41:34

== Personnel ==
=== Musicians ===
- Jacoby Kingston - Bass, vocals
- Erik Lindmark - Guitar, vocals
- Mike Hamilton - Drums

=== Production ===
- Recorded at Moon Productions
- Produced by Deeds of Flesh
- Thomas E. Gingell - Engineer
