= Reduced to Ashes (Deeds of Flesh album) =

Studio album by Deeds of Flesh
- Released: June 24, 2003
- Genre: Brutal death metal
- Length: 46:32
- Label: Unique Leader

Deeds of Flesh chronology
Mark of the Legion (2001)	Reduced to Ashes (2003)	Crown of Souls (2005)

Reduced to Ashes is the fifth full-length studio album by the American death metal band Deeds of Flesh. It was released in 2003.

Adam Lineker of Chronicles of Chaos rated it a 5 out of 10.

== Track listing ==
No.	Title	Length
1.	"Reduced to Ashes"	5:59
2.	"Infested Beneath the Earth"	4:13
3.	"Avowed Depraved"	5:11
4.	"Empyrean"	5:45
5.	"Human Trophies"	4:49
6.	"Banished"	4:41
7.	"Disinterred Archaic Heap"	4:07
8.	"The Endurance"	11:47
Total length:		46:32

== Personnel ==
=== Musicians ===
- Jacoby Kingston – bass, vocals
- Erik Lindmark – guitar, vocals
- Mike Hamilton – drums

=== Production ===
- Recorded at Avalon Digital Recording Studios
- Produced by Deeds of Flesh
- Kip Stork - Engineer
