= Path of the Weakening =

Studio album by Deeds of Flesh
- Released: April 1, 1999
- Genre: Brutal death metal
- Length: 31:40
- Label: Unique Leader

Deeds of Flesh chronology
| Promo 1999 (1999) | Path of the Weakening (1999) | Mark of the Legion (2001) |

Path of the Weakening is the third studio release by the American death metal band Deeds of Flesh. It was released in 1999.

Ivan Tibos of Concreteweb rated it an 80 out of 100.

== Track listing ==
| No. | Title | Length |
|---|---|---|
| 1. | "Indigenous to the Appalling (Mutinous Human)" | 3:49 |
| 2. | "Lustmord" | 2:41 |
| 3. | "Path of the Weakening" | 4:51 |
| 4. | "Summarily Killed" | 3:31 |
| 5. | "Sounds of Loud Reigns" | 3:26 |
| 6. | "Execute the Anthropophagi" | 3:59 |
| 7. | "I Die on My Own Terms" | 2:36 |
| 8. | "Sense of the Diabolic" | 3:18 |
| 9. | "A Violent God" | 3:29 |
| Total length: | | 31:40 |

== Personnel ==
=== Musicians ===
- Jacoby Kingston – bass, vocals
- Erik Lindmark – guitar, vocals
- Jimmy Tkacz – guitar
- Joey Heaslet – drums

=== Production ===
- Recorded at Moon Productions Recording Studio
- Produced by Deeds of Flesh
- Thomas E. Gingell – Engineer
