= Parallels of Infinite Torture =

Studio album by Disgorge
- Released: May 17, 2005
- Genre: Brutal death metal
- Length: 43:52
- Label: Crash Music Inc.

Disgorge chronology
Consume the Forsaken (2002)	Parallels of Infinite Torture (2005)

Professional ratings
Review scores
Source	Rating
Allmusic	3.5/5 stars

Parallels of Infinite Torture is the fourth and final studio album by American death metal band Disgorge. It is the band's longest studio release, with a total run time of 43:42.

== Track listing ==
1. "Revealed in Obscurity" — 5:13
2. "Enthroned Abominations" — 4:05
3. "Atonement" — 2:57
4. "Abhorrent Desecration of Thee Iniquity" — 4:15
5. "Forgotten Scriptures" — 2:01
6. "Descending upon Convulsive Devourment" — 4:38
7. "Condemned to Sufferance" — 4:57
8. "Parallels of Infinite Torture" — 5:03
9. "Asphyxiation of Thee Oppressed" — 5:42
10. "Ominous Sigils of Ungodly Ruin" — 4:39
