= Crown of Souls =

Studio album by Deeds of Flesh
- Released: May 17, 2005
- Recorded: Jan–Feb 2005 Avalon Recording Studio
- Genre: Brutal death metal
- Length: 42:11
- Label: Unique Leader
- Producer: Deeds of Flesh

Deeds of Flesh chronology
Reduced to Ashes (2003)	Crown of Souls (2005)	Of What's to Come (2008)

Crown of Souls is the sixth studio album by death metal band Deeds of Flesh, released on May 17, 2005 (see 2005 in music). It retains a similar style to their previous album Reduced to Ashes. The CD was followed up with a music video by critically acclaimed music video director Benjamin Kantor. The video was released on their Deeds of Flesh: Live In Montreal DVD.

Jackie Smit of Chronicles of Chaos rated it a 7.5 out of 10.

== Track listing ==
No.	Title	Length
1.	"Crown of Souls"	5:18
2.	"Medical Murder"	4:41
3.	"Hammer-Forged Blade"	5:09
4.	"Forced Attrition"	4:01
5.	"This Macabre Fetish"	3:58
6.	"The Resurrected"	5:16
7.	"Incontestably Evil"	4:03
8.	"Crimson Offering"	5:21
9.	"Caught Devouring"	4:24
Total length:		42:11

== Credits ==
- Jacoby Kingston - Bass, vocals
- Erik Lindmark - Guitar, vocals
- Mike Hamilton - Drums
- Recorded at: Avalon Recording Studio
- Produced by: Deeds of Flesh
- Engineered by: Kip Stork
- All music & lyrics: Deeds of Flesh
- Cover art: Raymond Swanland
- Viking art: Par Olofsson
- Photography: S.E.Miller
- Layout: J.K.
