= Portals to Canaan =

Studio album by Deeds of Flesh
- Released: June 25, 2013
- Recorded: Avalon Recording Studios
- Genre: Technical death metal
- Length: 42:27
- Label: Unique Leader
- Producer: Deeds of Flesh

Deeds of Flesh chronology
Of What's to Come (2008)	Portals to Canaan (2013)	Nucleus (2020)

Portals to Canaan is the eighth studio album by Californian death metal band Deeds of Flesh. It was released on June 25, 2013 on Unique Leader Records. This is the last album to feature Erik Lindmark before his death in 2018.

David E. Gehlke of Dead Rhetoric rated the album a 7.5 out of 10, writing that the band "compiles harsh vocals with heavy metal instrumentals and alien-like sound effects to generate a mildly psychedelic, strongly aggressive, intergalactic atmosphere."

== Track listing ==
1. Amidst the Ruins - 4:32
2. Entranced in Decades of Psychedelic Sleep - 6:39
3. Rise of the Virvum Juggernaut - 4:13
4. Celestial Serpents - 5:36
5. Caelum Hirundines Terra / The Sky Swallows the Earth - 1:47
6. Xeno-Virus - 5:30
7. Hollow Human Husks - 4:09
8. Portals to Canaan - 4:35
9. Orphans of Sickness (Gorguts cover) - 5:26

== Personnel ==
- Erik Lindmark - guitars, vocals
- Mike Hamilton - drums
- Craig Peters - lead guitars
- Ivan Munguia - bass guitar
