= War of Attrition (album) =

Studio album by Dying Fetus
- Released: March 6, 2007
- Recorded: September – October 2006
- Studio: Hit and Run Studios
- Genre: Brutal death metal, technical death metal
- Length: 36:46
- Label: Relapse
- Producer: Dying Fetus

Dying Fetus chronology
Stop at Nothing (2003)	War of Attrition (2007)	Descend into Depravity (2009)

Professional ratings
Review scores
Source	Rating
About.com	4/5 stars
AllMusic	3.5/5 stars
Blabbermouth.net	8/10 stars
Metal Storm	(6.8/10)
BW&BK	9/10 stars
Rock Hard	8/10 stars
Metal.de	6/10 stars

War of Attrition is the fifth album by Dying Fetus. According to the album booklet, the album's lyrics were written solely by guitarist Mike Kimball, who would leave the band after this album. This album was praised by original fans due to its return to traditional Dying Fetus form but was also criticized for its poor production in comparison to other releases. It was also their first self-produced album in nine years. This was the band’s last album recorded as a four piece.

Former co-vocalist Vince Matthews and former drummer Eric Seyanga departed in 2005 to form the band Covenance. Gallagher once again found a new member, drummer Duane Timlin. With this line-up, Gallagher promised to record what he called "our most brutal album yet".

== Track listing ==
All lyrics are written by Mike Kimball.

No.	Title	Length
1.	"Homicidal Retribution"	5:29
2.	"Fate of the Condemned"	4:41
3.	"Raping the System"	6:11
4.	"Insidious Repression"	3:32
5.	"Unadulterated Hatred"	4:47
6.	"The Ancient Rivalry"	3:41
7.	"Parasites of Catastrophe"	4:12
8.	"Obsolete Deterrence"	4:13

== Personnel ==
- John Gallagher – guitars, vocals
- Mike Kimball – guitars
- Sean Beasley – bass guitar, vocals
- Duane Timlin – drums
