= The Burning Horizon at the End of Dawn =

Studio album by The Mandrake
- Released: August 24, 2004
- Recorded: Hellion Studios
- Genre: Melodic death metal
- Length: 47:58
- Label: Crash Music
- Producer: Dave Otero

The Mandrake chronology
Dying Sentiment (2001)	The Burning Horizon at the End of Dawn (2004)	Dreaming Dead (2006)

Professional ratings
Review scores
Source	Rating
AllMusic	3/5 stars

The Burning Horizon at the End of Dawn is the debut studio album by the death metal band The Mandrake. It was released through Crash Music on August 24, 2004.

== Track listing ==
No.	Title	Length
1.	"Disharmonize the Heavens"	6:11
2.	"Renounce the Sun"	4:46
3.	"The Burning Horizon"	5:59
4.	"Bringer of Dreams : A Fallen Angel" (instrumental)	3:05
5.	"Deadside of Eden"	5:10
6.	"At the End of Dawn"	4:23
7.	"Sentence of Three"	4:20
8.	"Inherit"	5:40
9.	"Night of Day"	7:19
Total length:		47:58

== Personnel ==
The Mandrake

- James Ryan Taron – vocals
- Ron Carillo – lead guitar
- Kelly Tussey – rhythm guitar
- Bret Phillips – bass
- Alex Shalenko – keyboards
- Mike Horn – drums

Additional

- Dave Otero – producer
- Nick Jackson – artwork, layout
