= Wrong One to Fuck With =

Studio album by Dying Fetus
- Released: June 23, 2017
- Studio: WrightWay Studios (Baltimore, Maryland)
- Genre: Brutal death metal, technical death metal
- Length: 53:58
- Label: Relapse
- Producer: Steve Wright, Dying Fetus

Dying Fetus chronology
Reign Supreme (2012)	Wrong One to Fuck With (2017)	Make Them Beg for Death (2023)

Professional ratings
Review scores
Source	Rating
AllMusic	favorable
Exclaim!	8/10
MetalSucks	3.5/5 stars

Wrong One to Fuck With is the eighth studio album by American death metal band Dying Fetus, released on June 23, 2017 via Relapse Records.

== Track listing ==
No.	Title	Length
1.	"Fixated on Devastation"	4:05
2.	"Panic Amongst the Herd"	3:18
3.	"Die with Integrity"	5:14
4.	"Reveling in the Abyss"	6:29
5.	"Seething with Disdain"	5:32
6.	"Ideological Subjugation"	5:19
7.	"Weaken the Structure"	5:01
8.	"Fallacy"	4:29
9.	"Unmitigated Detestation"	5:20
10.	"Wrong One to Fuck With"	4:52
Total length:		49:39

Bonus Track
No.	Title	Length
11.	"Induce Terror"	4:19

== Personnel ==
Performance and production credits are adapted from the album liner notes.

=== Dying Fetus ===
- John Gallagher – guitars, vocals
- Sean Beasley – bass, vocals
- Trey Williams – drums

=== Production ===
- Steve Wright – production
- Dying Fetus – production
- Tony Eichler – mastering

=== Visual art ===
- Sam Shapiro – cover art
- Brendan Barone – cover art
- Orion Landau – layout
- Josh Sisk – photography

=== Studios ===
- WrightWay Studios, Baltimore, MD, US – engineering, mixing
- Goldtone MasterWorks – mastering

== Charts ==
Chart	Peak position
Austrian Albums (Ö3 Austria)	62
Belgian Albums (Ultratop Flanders)	80
Belgian Albums (Ultratop Wallonia)	135
German Albums (Offizielle Top 100)	54
Swiss Albums (Schweizer Hitparade)	46
US Billboard 200	180
