= Perverse Recollections of a Necromangler =

Studio album by Waking the Cadaver
- Released: November 21, 2007
- Recorded: February–April 2007
- Studio: Cape Studios, Cape May, New Jersey
- Genre: Slam death metal, deathcore
- Length: 26:30
- Label: Necroharmonic
- Producer: Steve Ryan, CJ Thouret

Waking the Cadaver chronology
Demo 2006 (2006)	Perverse Recollections of a Necromangler (2007)	Beyond Cops, Beyond God (2010)

Perverse Recollections of a Necromangler is the debut album by American death metal band Waking the Cadaver, released on November 21, 2007, by Necroharmonic Productions.

== Background and recording ==
Perverse Recollections of a Necromangler was recorded at Cape Studios located in Cape May, New Jersey, during February to April 2007. Two Robert De Niro films were sampled for use as an intro for two different songs: Taxi Driver (1976) and A Bronx Tale (1993). According to the album's liner notes, no effects processing was used on the band's voices. The tracks "Blood Splattered Satisfaction" and "Chased Through the Woods by a Rapist" were re-recorded for this record, the originals were initially released on the band's 2006 demo.

== Reception ==
The album received poor reviews and reception from critics. Daniel Cairns of Chronicles of Chaos gave the album a score of 1.5 out of 10 and stated "It's a boring buzz of crap riffs, shitty drumming and belched vocals. It's genuinely painful to listen to at times, and you yearn for something a bit more pleasant and musical."

AllMusic, when reviewing the band's following album Beyond Cops, Beyond God, stated "Anyone who heard Waking the Cadaver's first album, 2007's Perverse Recollections of a Necromangler, would find it hard to believe that any label would pick them up. They were almost laughably inept."

== Track list ==
No.	Title	Length
1.	"Intro"	1:11
2.	"Always Unprotected"	2:36
3.	"Raped, Pillaged, and Gutted"	3:38
4.	"Connoisseurs of Death"	2:38
5.	"(Interlude)"	0:53
6.	"Type A Secretor"	2:14
7.	"Tire Iron Emblugeonment"	2:38
8.	"Blood Splattered Satisfaction"	2:34
9.	"Pigtails Are for Face Fucking"	3:02
10.	"Chased Through the Woods by a Rapist"	1:51
11.	"I Know the Insides of Women"	3:15
Total length:		26:30

== Personnel ==
Waking the Cadaver

- Don Campan – lead vocals
- Dennis Morgan – drums, backing vocals
- Steve Vermilyea – bass, backing vocals
- Jerry Regan – guitar
- Nick Palmateer – guitar

Production staff

- Miguel Gomes – recording
- C.J. Thouret – production, mixing, mastering
- Steve Ryan – production, mixing, mastering
- Tony Koehl – cover art, layout

All music written and performed by Waking the Cadaver. Lyrics to tracks 2–7 and 9–11 written by drummer Denis Morgan and guitarist Steve Vermilyea. Lyrics to track 8 written by vocalist Don Campan.
