= Trading Pieces =

Studio album by Deeds of Flesh
- Released: July 1996
- Genre: Brutal death metal
- Length: 30:21
- Label: Repulse Records

Deeds of Flesh chronology
Gradually Melted (1995)	Trading Pieces (1996)	Inbreeding the Anthropophagi (1998)

Trading Pieces is the debut full-length studio release by death metal band Deeds of Flesh. It was released in 1996.

Eduardo Rivadavia of AllMusic rated it two out of five stars.

== Track listing ==
No.	Title	Length
1.	"Carnivorous Ways"	3:42
2.	"Born Then Torn Apart"	2:09
3.	"Trading Pieces"	2:50
4.	"Hunting Humans"	2:44
5.	"Impious Offerings"	3:00
6.	"Acid Troops"	3:41
7.	"Deeds of Flesh"	2:57
8.	"Erected on Stakes"	1:59
9.	"Chunks in the Shower"	2:29
10.	"Blasted"	2:17
11.	"Outro"	2:33
Total length:		30:21

== Personnel ==
- Jacoby Kingston - Bass, vocals
- Erik Lindmark - Guitar, vocals
- Joey Heaslet - Drums
