= Make Them Beg for Death =

Studio album by Dying Fetus
- Released: September 8, 2023
- Genre: Brutal death metal, technical death metal
- Length: 37:29
- Label: Relapse
- Producer: Steve Wright, Dying Fetus

Dying Fetus chronology
Wrong One to Fuck With (2017)	Make Them Beg for Death (2023)

Singles from Make Them Beg for Death
- 1. "Compulsion for Cruelty" Released: September 2, 2022; 2. "Unbridled Fury" Released: February 3, 2023; 3. "Feast of Ashes" Released: July 11, 2023; 4. "Throw Them in the Van" Released: August 8, 2023

Professional ratings
Review scores
Source	Rating
Kerrang!	4/5
metalinjection.net	9/10

Make Them Beg for Death is the ninth studio album by American death metal band Dying Fetus, released on September 8, 2023, by Relapse Records.

== Track listing ==
All music is composed by John Gallagher.

No.	Title	Lyrics	Length
1.	"Enlighten Through Agony"	Beasley	3:28
2.	"Compulsion for Cruelty"	Gallagher	4:36
3.	"Feast of Ashes"	Beasley	4:35
4.	"Throw Them in the Van"	Gallagher	1:41
5.	"Unbridled Fury"	Beasley	3:30
6.	"When the Trend Ends"	Gallagher	3:54
7.	"Undulating Carnage"	Beasley	4:08
8.	"Raised in Victory, Razed in Defeat"	Beasley	3:38
9.	"Hero's Grave"	Beasley	3:41
10.	"Subterfuge"	Beasley	4:18
Total length:			37:29

== Personnel ==
Performance and production credits are adapted from the album liner notes.

=== Dying Fetus ===
- John Gallagher – guitars, vocals
- Sean Beasley – bass, vocals
- Trey Williams – drums

=== Production ===
- Steve Wright – production
- Dying Fetus – production
- Mark Lewis – mixing, mastering

=== Visual art ===
- Kendall Johhns – album artwork photography
- Brendan Barone – cover art
- Daniel McBride – artwork, layout

=== Studios ===
- WrightWay Studios in Baltimore, Maryland, US – engineering, mixing

== Charts ==
Chart	Peak position
Belgian Albums (Ultratop Flanders)	114
Swiss Albums (Schweizer Hitparade)	28
