= Reign Supreme =

Studio album by Dying Fetus
- Released: June 19, 2012
- Studio: WrightWay Studios, Baltimore
- Genre: Brutal death metal, technical death metal
- Length: 37:32
- Label: Relapse
- Producer: Steve Wright, Dying Fetus

Dying Fetus chronology
Descend into Depravity (2009)	Reign Supreme (2012)	Wrong One to Fuck With (2017)

Professional ratings
Review scores
Source	Rating
About.com	4/5 stars
AllMusic	3.5/5 stars
Exclaim!	positive
Metal Storm	8.5/10
Spin	7/10

Reign Supreme is the seventh studio album by Dying Fetus. It was released on June 19, 2012 in the United States, June 22, 2012 in Germany, and June 25, 2012 in the rest of Europe.

Deluxe editions feature expanded artwork, a sticker, and the bonus track, "Dead Whores Love to Fuck".

"Second Skin" is featured on the season 23 episode Band in China of the show South Park as one of the songs the fictional band Crimson Dawn performs.

== Background ==
Commented Dying Fetus guitarist/vocalist John Gallagher: "The last album had some groove in it, but [it] was basically a lot of tech; this one is a return to form of older Fetus albums, so to speak — more modern production, though, of course. Everything's tight, the sound is crushing, the drums are amazing."

== Track listing ==
All music is composed by Gallagher.

No.	Title	Lyrics	Length
1.	"Invert the Idols"	Gallagher	2:08
2.	"Subjected to a Beating"	Gallagher	5:00
3.	"Second Skin"	Beasley	4:42
4.	"From Womb to Waste"	Gallagher	4:43
5.	"Dissidence"	Beasley	3:27
6.	"In the Trenches"	Gallagher	3:44
7.	"Devout Atrocity"	Beasley	4:28
8.	"Revisionist Past"	Beasley	3:57
9.	"The Blood of Power"	Beasley	5:23
Total length:			37:32

Deluxe edition bonus track
No.	Title	Length
10.	"Dead Whores Love to Fuck"	0:50
Total length:		38:22

== Credits ==
Writing, performance and production credits are adapted from the album liner notes.

=== Personnel ===
==== Dying Fetus ====
- John Gallagher – guitars, vocals
- Sean Beasley – bass, vocals
- Trey Williams – drums

==== Production ====
- Steve Wright – production, engineering, mixing, mastering
- Dying Fetus – production
- Noah Gary – additional engineering
- Sarah Fabiszak – additional engineering

==== Artwork and design ====
- Orion Landau – artwork

== Charts ==
Chart (2012)	Peak position
Belgian Albums (Ultratop Flanders)	138
US Billboard 200	186
US Independent Albums (Billboard)	34
US Top Hard Rock Albums (Billboard)	14
US Heatseekers Albums (Billboard)	3
