= Destroy the Opposition =

Studio album by Dying Fetus
- Released: October 3, 2000
- Recorded: April – June 2000
- Studio: Hit and Run Studios, Rockville, Maryland
- Genre: Brutal death metal, technical death metal
- Length: 36:25
- Label: Relapse
- Producer: Dying Fetus; Steve Carr

Dying Fetus chronology
Killing on Adrenaline (1998)	Destroy the Opposition (2000)	Stop at Nothing (2003)

Professional ratings
Review scores
Source	Rating
AllMusic	2.5/5 stars
BW&BK	8/10 stars
Rock Hard	7.5/10 stars

Destroy the Opposition is the third album by American death metal band Dying Fetus. It was produced by the band and Steve Carr. The album marks a change in Dying Fetus's direction, with political themes becoming dominant, which has continued in all of their subsequent albums.

Albert Mudrian, in his 2004 book Choosing Death, cited Destroy the Opposition as one of the most important albums released in 2000. The album was also included in Decibel's Top 100 Albums of the decade list for the 2000s (Decibel Magazine Special Edition, December 2009), as well as to Decibel's "Hall of Fame" (#89, July 2012).

The album was released in the same year in which Dying Fetus formed Blunt Force Records.

== Track listing ==
All lyrics are written by Jason Netherton.

No.	Title	Music	Length
1.	"Praise the Lord (Opium of the Masses)"	Gallagher	5:31
2.	"Destroy the Opposition"	Gallagher	5:11
3.	"Born in Sodom"	Gallagher	4:46
4.	"Epidemic of Hate"	Gallagher	4:42
5.	"Pissing in the Mainstream"	Gallagher	1:57
6.	"In Times of War"	Netherton	3:08
7.	"For Us or Against Us"	Voyles	5:34
8.	"Justifiable Homicide"	Netherton	5:35

== Personnel ==
- John Gallagher – guitars, vocals
- Jason Netherton – bass guitar, vocals
- Sparky Voyles – guitars
- Kevin Talley – drums
