= Inbreeding the Anthropophagi =

Studio album by Deeds of Flesh
- Released: March 1998
- Genre: Brutal death metal
- Length: 30:37
- Label: Repulse Records

Deeds of Flesh chronology
| Trading Pieces (1996) | Inbreeding the Anthropophagi (1998) | Promo 1999 (1999) |

Inbreeding the Anthropophagi is the second full-length album by the American death metal band Deeds of Flesh. It was originally released in 1998 on CD through Displeased Records, and was later reissued by Unique Leader Records, a company founded and managed by members of the band.

== Music and lyrics ==
The album's style has been described as "brutal gore-infested death metal," and has been likened to the works of Suffocation and Incantation. Thematically, the album revolves around the legend of Sawney Bean and his family, telling of their cave-dwelling existence and grisly practice of attacking travellers on local roads for food and profit.

== Artwork ==
Joe DiVita of Loudwire said the album's cover artwork "look[s] exaggerated and cartoonish and, at the same time, pretty damn scary. The little hunched over, bug-eyed creature in the bottom right corner looks to be sneaking a bit of a snack and with the piles of bones in the background, it’s easy to surmise where the meat was sourced."

== Reception and legacy ==
Chronicles of Chaos rated the album eight out of ten and described it as "excellent American death metal, but will require some effort to enjoy."

Jason Hundey of AllMusic gave the album one and a half stars out of five. He wrote: "Well here's the rundown: Deeds of Flesh play a Suffocation/Incantation style of brutal gore-infested death metal. [...] No real highlights stick out, as everything else seemed to be quite typical, following the American cookie-cutter model of "How to make an unoriginal death metal album" to a tee. However, it is very polished and well produced for the style of death metal that it is."

In 2024, Joe DiVita of Loudwire named the album as one of the "31 Scariest Metal Album Covers of All Time".

== Track listing ==
| No. | Title | Length |
|---|---|---|
| 1. | "End of All" | 1:21 |
| 2. | "Feeding Time" | 4:24 |
| 3. | "Inbreeding the Anthropophagi" | 4:46 |
| 4. | "Infecting Them with Falsehood" | 4:54 |
| 5. | "Canvas of Flesh" | 3:04 |
| 6. | "Ritual of Battle" | 3:35 |
| 7. | "Fly Shrine" | 4:12 |
| 8. | "Gradually Melted" | 4:21 |
| Total length: | | 30:37 |

== Personnel ==
=== Musicians ===
- Jacoby Kingston - Bass, vocals
- Erik Lindmark - Guitar, vocals
- Brad Palmer - Drums

=== Guest musicians ===
- Matti Way (ex-Disgorge) - Backing vocals

=== Production ===
- Recorded at Moon Studios
- Produced by Deeds of Flesh
- Tomas E. Gingle - Engineering and effects
