= Purification Through Violence =

Studio album by Dying Fetus
- Released: August 6, 1996
- Recorded: 1996
- Genres: Brutal death metal; grindcore
- Length: 28:42
- Label: Pulverizer
- Producer: Dying Fetus

Dying Fetus chronology
Infatuation with Malevolence (1995)	Purification Through Violence (1996)	Killing on Adrenaline (1998)

Professional ratings
Review scores
Source	Rating
Chronicles of Chaos	7/10
Sea of Tranquility	3/5 stars

Purification Through Violence is the debut studio album by American death metal band Dying Fetus, following Infatuation with Malevolence, a collection of early demos. It was released in 1996.

The band left Pulverizer Records soon after the album's release.

== Release history ==
Purification Through Violence was reissued in January 2011 by Relapse. It included the bonus tracks "Beaten into Submission" (1997 rehearsal demo) and "Raped on the Altar" (live in Herbolzheim, Germany, 1998).

== Track listing ==
All lyrics are written by Jason Netherton; all music is composed by John Gallagher except for track 8.

No.	Title	Writer(s)	Length
1.	"Blunt Force Trauma"		5:26
2.	"Beaten into Submission"		2:50
3.	"Skull Fucked"		2:55
4.	"Permanently Disfigured"		3:25
5.	"Raped on the Altar"		3:55
6.	"Nothing Left to Pray for"		3:55
7.	"Nocturnal Crucifixion"		3:23
8.	"Scum (Fuck the Weak)" (Napalm Death cover)	Jim Whitely, Mick Harris	2:53

== Personnel ==
- John Gallagher – guitars, vocals
- Jason Netherton – bass guitar, vocals
- Brian Latta – guitars
- Rob Belton – drums
