= Apocalyptic Feasting =

Studio album by Brain Drill
- Released: February 5, 2008
- Recorded: During August 2007 at Castle Ultimate Studios, Oakland, California
- Genre: Technical death metal, grindcore
- Length: 35:12
- Label: Metal Blade
- Producer: Zack Ohren

Brain Drill chronology
The Parasites (2006)	Apocalyptic Feasting (2008)	Quantum Catastrophe (2010)

Apocalyptic Feasting is the second release and debut album by the technical death metal band Brain Drill. It is the last release by the band to feature bassist Jeff Hughell and drummer Marco Pitruzella before their departure from Brain Drill during 2008.

== History ==
In August 2007, Brain Drill signed a worldwide deal with Metal Blade Records, and shortly after the quartet composed of founding member, guitarist Dylan Ruskin, vocalist Steve Rathjen, bassist Jeff Hughell, and drummer Marco Pitruzella, recorded with producer Zack Ohren, their full-length debut at Castle Ultimate Studios, in Oakland, California.

== Critical reception ==
Professional ratings
Review scores
Source	Rating
About.com	4.5/5 stars
Allmusic	4/5 stars

Apocalyptic Feasting was well received by critics, the reviewers wrote mostly praising the band's musicianship.

== Track listing ==
All tracks are written by Dylan Ruskin, except where noted.

No.	Title	Lyrics	Music	Length
1.	"Gorification"	Steve Rathjen		3:53
2.	"The Parasites"			3:24
3.	"Apocalyptic Feasting"	Steve Rathjen		3:41
4.	"Swine Slaughter"			3:10
5.	"Forcefed Human Shit"			1:31
6.	"Consumed by the Dead"			3:18
7.	"Revelation"			3:44
8.	"Bury the Living"	Steve Rathjen	Jeff Hughell	4:13
9.	"The Depths of Darkness"			3:54
10.	"Sadistic Abductive"	Steve Rathjen		4:19
Total length:				35:12

== Personnel ==
Brain Drill

- Jeff Hughell – bass guitar
- Dylan Ruskin – guitar
- Marco Pitruzzella – drums
- Steve Rathjen – vocals

Production

- Zack Ohren – producer, master, mixer
- Pär Olofsson – artwork
