= Killing on Adrenaline =

Studio album by Dying Fetus
- Released: July 27, 1998
- Recorded: May 1998
- Genre: Technical death metal, slam death metal
- Length: 34:28
- Label: Morbid
- Producer: Dying Fetus

Dying Fetus chronology
Purification Through Violence (1996)	Killing on Adrenaline (1998)	Destroy the Opposition (2000)

Professional ratings
Review scores
Source	Rating
Allmusic	4/5 stars
Blabbermouth	8.5/10 stars

Killing on Adrenaline is the second album by American technical death metal band Dying Fetus. The technical guitar riffs began on this release, a trait that evolved and progressed even more on later albums. The album was released by Morbid Records of Germany in 1998 as a one-album deal. By 2000, they had signed to Relapse Records, who have a long tradition in underground death metal and grind.

"Kill Your Mother/Rape Your Dog" was a deceptively-titled joke-song, about the band's standpoint on mainstream music.

The album was re-released by Night of the Vinyl Dead, on red, white and blue splatter vinyl, limited to 500 copies, in 2007.

It was re-issued in 2011 with bonus tracks by Relapse Records.

== Track listing ==
All lyrics are written by Jason Netherton, except where noted; all music is composed by John Gallagher, except where noted.

No.	Title	Lyrics	Music	Length
1.	"Killing on Adrenaline"			5:40
2.	"Procreate the Malformed"			7:06
3.	"Fornication Terrorists"			5:28
4.	"We Are Your Enemy"		Netherton	3:45
5.	"Kill Your Mother/Rape Your Dog"			1:16
6.	"Absolute Defiance"			3:53
7.	"Judgement Day" (Integrity cover)	Dwid Hellion	Dwid Hellion	1:50
8.	"Intentional Manslaughter"			5:30

== Personnel ==
- John Gallagher – guitars, vocals
- Jason Netherton – bass guitar, vocals
- Brian Latta – guitars
- Kevin Talley – drums
