= Descend into Depravity =

Studio album by Dying Fetus
- Released: September 15, 2009
- Recorded: April–May 2009
- Studio: WrightWay Studios, Baltimore, Maryland
- Genre: Brutal death metal, technical death metal
- Length: 33:45
- Label: Relapse
- Producer: Steve Wright, Dying Fetus

Dying Fetus chronology
| War of Attrition (2007) | Descend into Depravity (2009) | Reign Supreme (2012) |

Professional ratings
Review scores
| Source | Rating |
|---|---|
| About.com | 3.5/5 stars |
| AllMusic | 3.5/5 stars |
| Berontak Zine | 9/10 stars |
| Blabbermouth | 7.5/10 stars |

Descend into Depravity is the sixth studio album by American death metal band Dying Fetus. It was released in the United States on September 15, 2009, and worldwide on September 21, 2009. The album's release date and title had been announced on June 4, and the cover and track listing were revealed on July 15.

Descend into Depravity is the first Dying Fetus album where the band performs as a trio. With the dismissal of Duane Timlin in 2007, Trey Williams took his place as drummer. John Gallagher and Sean Beasley were left to write the lyrics and songs alone, as Mike Kimball had also left. Ever since this album the band has remained as a 3-piece.

== Track listing ==
All lyrics are written by Beasley

| No. | Title | Music | Length |
|---|---|---|---|
| 1. | "Your Treachery Will Die with You" | Gallagher | 3:34 |
| 2. | "Shepherd's Commandment" | Gallagher | 4:28 |
| 3. | "Hopeless Insurrection" | Beasley | 4:32 |
| 4. | "Conceived into Enslavement" | Gallagher | 4:24 |
| 5. | "Atrocious by Nature" | Gallagher | 3:52 |
| 6. | "Descend into Depravity" | Gallagher | 5:02 |
| 7. | "At What Expense?" | Beasley | 4:37 |
| 8. | "Ethos of Coercion" | Gallagher | 3:16 |
| Total length: | | | 33:45 |

== Credits ==
Writing, performance and production credits are adapted from the album liner notes.

=== Personnel ===
==== Dying Fetus ====
- John Gallagher – guitar, vocals
- Sean Beasley – bass, vocals
- Trey Williams – drums

==== Production ====
- Steve Wright – production, recording, mixing, mastering
- Dying Fetus – production
- Drew Lamond – additional engineering

==== Artwork and design ====
- Orion Landau – art direction, design
- Scott Kinkade – photography
- Josh Sisk – photography

== Charts ==
| Chart (2009) | Peak position |
|---|---|
| US Billboard 200 | 168 |
| US Independent Albums (Billboard) | 28 |
| US Top Hard Rock Albums (Billboard) | 24 |
| US Heatseekers Albums (Billboard) | 4 |
