= Brain Drill =

American technical death metal band

- Origin: Santa Cruz, California
- Genres: Technical death metal, grindcore
- Years active: 2005–2019
- Label: Metal Blade
- Members: Dylan Ruskin; Alex Bent; Travis Morgan
- Past members: Marco Pitruzzella; Andre Cornejo; Jeff Hughell; Joe Bondra; Ron Casey; Ivan Munguia; Steve Rathjen

Brain Drill was an American technical death metal band from Ben Lomond, California, formed in 2005 by guitarist and songwriter Dylan Ruskin. They released two albums while signed to Metal Blade Records and self-released their final third album, Boundless Obscenity.

== History ==
=== Formation and The Parasites (2005–2006) ===
Brain Drill was founded in 2005. It was originally meant to be a side project by guitarist Dylan Ruskin after leaving his main band, Burn at the Stake. Ruskin hired Marco Pitruzella (former drummer of death metal groups, Vile, Vital Remains, The Faceless, and other extreme metal bands) as a session drummer. After a few months of jam sessions, vocalist Steve Rathjen joined the band. The trio entered Castle Ultimate Studios with producer Zack Ohren and recorded their six-track EP, The Parasites, during March and May 2006. Rathjen left the band after the recording and was replaced with former Dead Syndicate singer, Andre Cornejo. Former Vile bassist Jeff Hughell joined the band permanently. Rathjen returned to Brain Drill as vocalist.

=== Apocalyptic Feasting (2007–2009) ===
In a 2007 interview, Cannibal Corpse's bassist Alex Webster recommended Brain Drill to Metal Blade Records, who signed the band later that year. The group entered Castle Ultimate Studios with producer Zack Ohren to work on their debut full-length, recorded during August 2007. Brain Drill's follow-up to their 2006 EP, Apocalyptic Feasting, was released on February 5, 2008 by Metal Blade.

Shortly after the release of Apocalyptic Feasting, Marco Pitruzzella and Jeff Hughell left the band due to touring complications. Based on a statement from Ruskin posted on the group's Myspace profile, it appeared that Brain Drill had split up. Soon after, the rumors were denied, and the band started looking for a new drummer and bassist.

=== Quantum Catastrophe, Boundless Obscenity and breakup (2009–2019) ===
Brain Drill entered Castle Ultimate studios with Zack Ohren in December 2009 to record their second album through Metal Blade Records. It was titled Quantum Catastrophe and was released on May 11, 2010. "Monumental Failure" premiered as streaming media before the album's release. A new song, "Beyond Bludgeoned", was released from the new record as the date neared. A music video was filmed for the song and is featured on Comcast on-demand.

In July 2016, vocalist Steve Rathjen and drummer Ron Casey left the band and were replaced with Travis Morgan and Alex Bent, respectively. Brain Drill entered Castle Ultimate Studios and self-released their third album, Boundless Obscenity on July 2, 2016.

On September 10, 2019, it was announced the band had broken up.

=== Post-Brain Drill (2019 - present) ===
In May 2024, Ruskin released the first single for his new project, Stellae Ignotus. The song is instrumental, with more focus on melody and synthesizers than Brain Drill had, but still demonstrating the same level of musicianship.

== Members ==
Final lineup

- Dylan Ruskin – guitars (2005–2019), bass (2005–2006, 2016–2019)
- Alex Bent – drums (2015–2019)
- Travis Morgan – vocals (2016–2019)

Former members

- Marco Pitruzzella – drums (2005–2008)
- Steve Rathjen – vocals (2005–2006, 2006–2016)
- Andre Cornejo – vocals (2006)
- Jeff Hughell – bass (2006–2008)
- Ivan Munguia – bass (2008–2016)
- Joe Bondra – drums (2008–2009)
- Ron Casey – drums (2009–2015)

== Discography ==
Studio albums

- Apocalyptic Feasting (2008)
- Quantum Catastrophe (2010)
- Boundless Obscenity (2016)

EPs

- The Parasites (2006)
