= Dying Sentiment =

Album by The Mandrake

Demo album by The Mandrake
- Released: 2001
- Genre: Death metal; black metal
- Length: 30:48
- Label: Self-released

The Mandrake chronology
Dying Sentiment (2001)	The Burning Horizon at the End of Dawn (2004)

Dying Sentiment is the first demo released by the death metal band The Mandrake. The album shows bits and pieces of the black metal style of music. It was released in 2001. The song "Night of Day" was re-recorded for the band's debut studio album The Burning Horizon at the End of Dawn.

== Track listing ==
No.	Title	Length
1.	"Summon the Krakken"	4:31
2.	"Circles of Fire"	4:18
3.	"Night of Day"	5:52
4.	"Here to Eternity"	2:50
5.	"Malevolent Garden"	6:04
6.	"Terminar (Outro)"	7:13

== Personnel ==
The Mandrake

- James Ryan Taron – vocals
- Ron Carillo – lead guitar
- Edison Shaw – rhythm guitar
- Brett Phillips – bass
- Alex Shalenko – keyboards
- Mike Horn – drums
