= Marco Pitruzzella =

American drummer

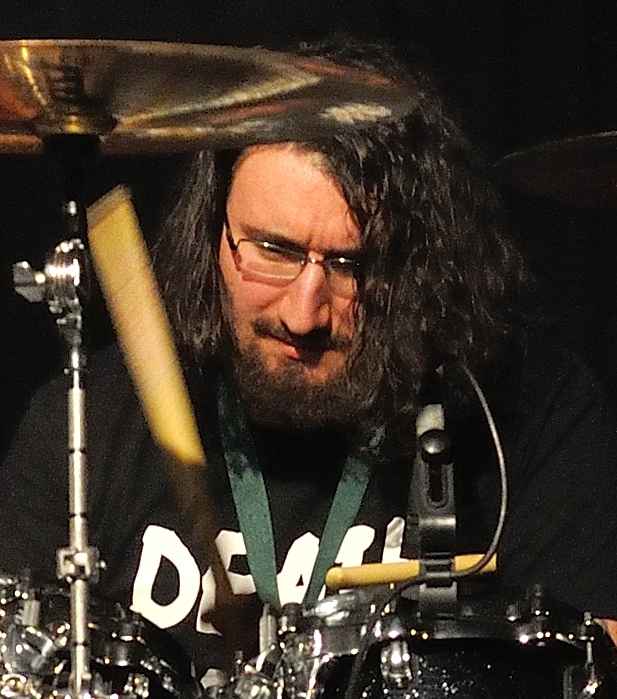
- Pitruzzella with Six Feet Under in 2015

Background information
- Also known as: Lord Marco
- Born: November 9, 1985 (age 40); Concord, Massachusetts, U.S.
- Genres: Death metal; deathcore; technical death metal
- Occupation: Musician
- Instrument: Drums
- Years active: 1994–present
- Member of: Wrath of Logarius; Six Feet Under
- Formerly of: Brain Drill; The Faceless; Rings of Saturn
- Website: lordmarco.com

Marco Pitruzzella (born November 9, 1985), also known as Lord Marco, is an American musician. Pitruzzella has been a part of numerous bands, particularly within the death metal genre, which includes Anomalous Brain Drill, Vile, Vital Remains, The Faceless and others. He was also a session drummer for Waking the Cadaver's Authority Through Intimidation.

He is currently a part of Waking The Cadaver, Wrath Of Logarius, and Six Feet Under.

== Biography ==
Marco Pitruzzella was born in Concord, Massachusetts. His family relocated to the Los Gatos, California when he was eight-years old. When he was nine, Pitruzzella began taking drum lessons from Brady Fishler, where he was taught to read sheet music, play jazz, rock, and all the drum rudiments. His drum lessons continued until he was 13, at which point Pitruzzella's passion for metal was born after hearing his first blast beat.

On his 14th birthday, Pitruzzella received his first double bass pedal. Pitruzzella practiced for several hours every day after school, playing along with his favourite death metal drummers. He was also active in his school's drumline and orchestra all throughout his schooling career. After graduating from high school in 2004, Pitruzzella joined Vörnagar, playing drums on their debut album The Bleeding Holocaust.

In 2005, he drummed for Vital Remains for a big European tour, touring 26 countries and playing 52 shows between August and November. In 2006, he created Brain Drill with guitarist Dylan Ruskin, releasing two albums, The Parasites (EP, 2006) and Apocalyptic Feasting (2008) on Metal Blade Records. He also met Jeff Hughell in 2006 and they both played live for Vile together.

In 2007, Pitruzzella joined The Faceless for a few US tours between March and June. Later that year, he also released his "home made" instructional DVD titled "Lord of the Blast".

In 2009, Jeff Hughell and Pitruzzella released a drum-and-bass death metal EP, titled I Came to Hate.

In February 2010, Pitruzzella officially joined Anomalous and recorded drums for their debut album OHMnivalent.

In 2012, Pitruzzella recorded drums for a Slam Coke song which was his first collaboration under that project. Also in 2012 Pitruzzella did session work for Gurglectomy, Defleshed and Gutted, ABUSE, and Raped by Pigs. He had completed the drum tracks for his band Neurogenic which will be released on Comatose Music in late 2016.

In 2013, Pitruzzella joined Six Feet Under as their full time touring drummer.

In 2015, Pitruzzella joined Sleep Terror as their full time touring drummer.

In 2016, Pitruzzella entered the LONDON BRIDGE Studios (in Seattle) to record drums for SIX FEET UNDER. Which will be the first SFU record to feature both Lord Marco and Jeff Hughell both have been touring members for SFU since 2013.

He has been playing metal exclusively for 16+ years.
