= Odious Mortem =

American death metal band

- Origin: San Francisco, California, United States
- Genres: Death metal, technical death metal
- Years active: 2001–present
- Labels: Willowtip, Unique Leader
- Members: Anthony Trapani; KC Howard; Dan Eggers; Joel Horner; Alex Bacey; Cary Geare
- Past members: Lee Smith; Ivan Munguia; David Siskin
- Website: Official Site

Odious Mortem is an American death metal band from San Francisco/Santa Cruz, California, United States. The band is signed to Willowtip Records. Odious Mortem has released three studio albums, through Unique Leader Records and Willowtip Records, as well as an independently released demo in 2003.

== Style ==
Odious Mortem features technically complex, down-tuned guitars and pummeling drum work. Lyrics include humanity, the Earth, drugs, psychosis, greed, fear, suffering, society, annihilation, human consciousness, and the collapse of civilization.

== Biography ==
KC Howard (drums), David Siskin (guitar), and Dan Eggers (guitar, vocals) formed Odious Mortem in 2000 in Encinitas, California. In 2003, Odious Mortem recorded and self-released the demo Gestation of Worms, which led to a deal with Unique Leader Records. The band recorded their debut album, Devouring The Prophecy, with engineer Matt Sotelo of Decrepit Birth, in March 2004 at Legion Studios in Santa Cruz, CA. It was released on February 8, 2005.

In 2004, Howard joined death metal band Decrepit Birth full time. In November 2006, after their "Bloodletting North America" tour with Deeds of Flesh, Odious Mortem completed work on their second album and entered Castle Ultimate Studios in Oakland, California to record new material. The resulting album, Cryptic Implosion, was released on April 24, 2007. Also in 2007, the band played at the Maryland Deathfest.

== Other projects ==
Eggers, Horner, and Howard were members of Decrepit Birth until 2010, and Anthony Trapani joined death metal band Severed Savior. David Siskin plays jungle and drum & bass under the alias Warbreaker.

== Discography ==
=== Albums ===
Date of release	Title	Label	Charted	Country	Catalog number
2003	Gestation of Worms (Demo)	self released			
February 8, 2005	Devouring The Prophecy	Unique Leader			B0007GAE26
April 23, 2007	Cryptic Implosion	Willowtip			WT-050
January 17, 2020	Synesthesia	Willowtip			WT-172

== Members ==
=== Current members ===
- Anthony Trapani - Vocals
- Dan Eggers - Rhythm Guitars
- Joel Horner - Bass
- KC Howard - Drums
- Alex Bacey - Lead Guitars
- Cary Geare - Melodic Guitars

=== Past members ===
- Ivan Munguia - Bass
- David Siskin - Guitars
- Lee Smith - Drums
