= Stop at Nothing (album) =

Studio album by Dying Fetus
- Released: May 13, 2003
- Recorded: Hit And Run Studios, Rockville, Maryland in November 2002
- Genre: Brutal death metal, technical death metal
- Length: 35:37
- Label: Relapse Records
- Producer: Dying Fetus; Steve Carr

Dying Fetus chronology
Destroy the Opposition (2000)	Stop at Nothing (2003)	War of Attrition (2007)

Professional ratings
Review scores
Source	Rating
AllMusic	3/5 stars
BW&BK	6/10 stars
Rock Hard	8/10 stars

Stop at Nothing is the fourth album by American technical death metal band Dying Fetus. The album, like its predecessor Destroy the Opposition, was produced by the band and Steve Carr.

Soon after the release of Destroy the Opposition, all of the band except for John Gallagher quit. Gallagher brought in new vocalist Vince Matthews, guitarist Mike Kimball, bass guitarist Sean Beasley and drummer Eric Seyanga. This is the band’s only album recorded as a five-piece.

The black and white part of the cover of the album is part of a photograph taken by Lewis Wickes Hine, the American sociologist and photographer, called "Power house mechanic working on steam pump". The steam pump has been shown in color while the original photo was completely black and white.

A video was produced for the song "One Shot, One Kill".

Two tracks from the album were used in Viva La Bam, "Schematics" in the second-season episode "Tree Top Casino" and "One Shot One Kill" in the third-season episode "Angry Ape".

== Track listing ==
All lyrics are written by Mike Kimball, except where noted; all music is composed by John Gallagher, except where noted.

No.	Title	Lyrics	Music	Length
1.	"Schematics"	Bruce Greig, Kimball		3:59
2.	"One Shot, One Kill"		Gallagher, Kimball	4:25
3.	"Institutions of Deceit"		Gallagher, Kimball	3:39
4.	"Abandon All Hope"		Gallagher, Kimball	6:22
5.	"Forced Elimination"			3:22
6.	"Stop at Nothing"			3:09
7.	"Onslaught of Malice"			5:33
8.	"Vengeance Unleashed"	Greig		5:08

== Personnel ==
- Vince Matthews – lead vocals
- John Gallagher – guitars, co-lead vocals
- Mike Kimball – guitars
- Sean Beasley – bass
- Erik Sayenga – drums
