= The Mandrake (band) =

American heavy metal band

- Origin: Fort Collins, Colorado, United States
- Genres: Death metal; melodic death metal; black metal (early)
- Years active: 2001–present
- Label: Crash Music
- Members: Ron Carillo; James Cummings; Addie Suazo; Mike Horn; Andy Hitch
- Past members: James Ryan Taron; Kelly Tussey; Alex Shalenko; Bret Philips; Edison Shaw

The Mandrake is a death metal band who were signed to Crash Music but now describe themselves as looking for a new label, while

releasing their next EP independently. They have released one demo and one studio album.

The Mandrake is, according to their record label, an example of an American band with a lot of Scandinavian influences from the likes of Age of Ruin, Opeth and At the Gates; Scandinavia having dominated the black and death metal scene throughout the 1990s. The band achieved early success, garnering favorable reviews even in the demo stage. Slight touches of black metal are often present in some of their work. While at the demo stage, they opened for international bands including Six Feet Under, Fear Factory and Behemoth.

== History ==
The Mandrake was founded in early 2001 by their guitarist, Ron Carillo, and they released their first demo, Dying Sentiment, later that year. Their debut studio album, The Burning Horizon at the End of Dawn, was released through Crash Music on August 24, 2004. The band would self-release the EP Dreaming Dead in 2006 before returning to Crash Music, who released the band's second studio album, Black Prophecy, in 2009.

== Band members ==
Current members

- Ron Carillo – lead guitar (2001–present)
- Mike Horn – drums (2001–present)
- James Cummings – vocals (2005–present)
- Andy Hitch – rhythm guitar (2005–present)
- Addie Suazo – bass (2005–present)

Former members

- Edison Shaw – rhythm guitar (2001–2003)
- Alex Shalenko – keyboards (2001–2004)
- James Ryan Taron – vocals (2001–2005)
- Brett Phillips – bass (2001–2005)
- Kelly Tussey – rhythm guitar (2003–2005)

== Discography ==
Studio albums

Year	Album	Label
2004	The Burning Horizon at the End of Dawn	Crash Music
2009	Black Prophecy	Crash Music

Other releases

Year	Album	Label	Notes
2001	Dying Sentiment	Self-released	Demo
2006	Dreaming Dead	Self-released	EP
