= Vile (band) =

American death metal band

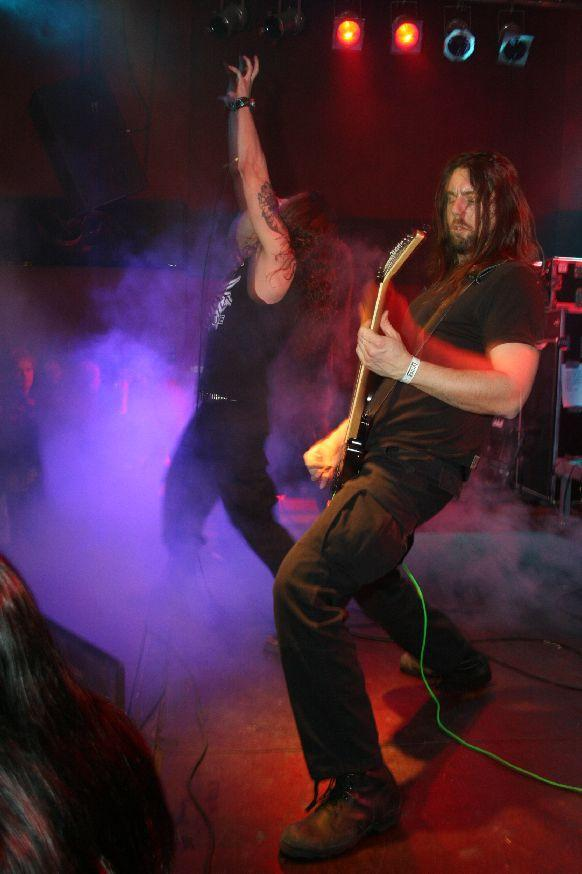
- Vile 2006 Gutting Europe tour

Background information
- Origin: Concord, California, United States
- Genres: Melodic death metal; brutal death metal (early)
- Years active: 1996–present
- Labels: Willowtip; Listenable; Unique Leader Records
- Members: Colin E. Davis; Mike Hrubovcak; Tyson Jupin
- Past members: Jeff Hughell; Matt Faivre; Mike Hamilton; Aaron Strong; Jimmy Tkacz; Luke Jaeger; Juan Urteaga; J.J. Hrubovcak; Reno Kiillerich; Lance Wright; Marco Pitruzzella
- Website: www.vilemetal.com

Vile is an American death metal band, formed in 1996 in Concord, California by guitarist-producer Colin E. Davis (who is now the only original member in the line-up) and singer Juan Urteaga, recruiting the rest of the band from the ranks of disbanded groups such as Lords of Chaos, Entropy, Sporadic Psychosis and Thanatopsis. Vile toured the United States and Europe several times since their inception in 1996 including with Cannibal Corpse in 2004. Their most recent tour was of Japan in December 2013.

The band has released four studio albums between 1999 and 2011 and re-released their demos and some live material on Rare Tracks, distributed by Hammerheart Records. The band started recording of the fourth album Metamorphosis on January 25, 2009, which was released in late 2011 by Willowtip Records in North America and Hammerheart Records in Europe.

Vile found publicity in the late 1990s when members of the band Cannibal Corpse praised their sound and wore their T-shirts in publicity photos. Although Vile's sound has a wide variety of influences, their first album contained riffs clearly influenced by Cannibal Corpse and the name Vile itself is the title of an album by Cannibal Corpse. Founding member Davis has stated that these relations were unintentional and his biggest early influence was the Florida band Morbid Angel. Vile is known for high standards in musicianship and studio quality, and Davis produced and recorded their albums, sometimes in coordination with singer Juan Urteaga.

Several members of the band have held positions in other well known extreme metal bands including Mike Hruboccak and Michael Poggione (both Monstrosity), Mike Hamilton (Deeds of Flesh, Exhumed), Reno Kiilerich (Dimmu Borgir, Hate Eternal), J.J. Hrubovcak (Hate Eternal), and James Lee (Origin).

== History ==
The first two demos, Unearthed and Vile-ation, recorded in 1996 and 1997 respectively, constituted the original Vile lineup. Juan Urteaga (vocals), Colin Davis (guitar), Jim Tkacz (guitar), Matt Faivre (bass), Mike Hamilton (drums). The band's signature style, namely the mixture of Floridian style death metal riffing with catchy rhythmic grooves, was generated at this time. The band's self-released debut LP, Stench of the Deceased, contained six of the previously recorded demo songs and two new songs, re-recorded. Jim Tkacz left the band before the album was recorded and was replaced by Aaron Strong, who had appeared on the previous demos as a guest lead guitarist.

During this period, Vile played often in the Bay Area, often opening for more prominent acts such as Deicide, Cannibal Corpse, Morbid Angel and others. They toured eastward into Texas with Deeds of Flesh in 1997 and played a West Coast mini tour with Immolation in 1998.

The band received some initial positive attention in the death metal music scene and press due to fact that members of Cannibal Corpse spoke highly of them in interviews and wore their T-shirts publicly.

After the release of their debut LP, Relapse Records began courting the band and they played the Relapse stages at the 1999 Milwaukee Metalfest as well as the November to Dismember metalfest in San Antonio Texas the same year. They again played the Relapse stage at the year 2000 Milwaukee Metalfest.

Relapse Records signed the band to a three-album deal in 2000, but then dropped the band in 2001 during a period of quiet after drummer Mike Hamilton quit the band and Vile had a difficult time replacing him.

Hamilton was eventually replaced by drummer Tyson Jupin, and the band signed to the French label Listenable Records as well as striking a North American deal with Unique Leader Records.

Vile released their second LP, Depopulate in 2002. This album was notably faster and more progressive and received good reviews from fans and the press. The band toured Europe in 2003 as a headliner with Mangled, Disavowed and Spawn of Possession. In 2004, they opened for Cannibal Corpse during the Tour of the Wretched North American tour. Both of these tours incorporated guest drummer Reno Kiilerich who subsequently played with Dimmu Borgir and Hate Eternal. The Cannibal tour also incorporated James Lee of the band Origin as fill in vocalist and Luke Jaeger on lead guitars.

In 2005, the band released their third LP, The New Age of Chaos. This album featured more prominent melodies and song structures were simplified. Singer Juan Urteaga performed on the album but left the band after its release. The band toured the US and Europe in support of the album in 2005 and 2006. Marco Pitruzella played drums for the band during a California mini tour in 2006 and brothers J.J. and Mike Hrubovcak (guitar and vocals) joined the band.

Vile was relatively quiet during the years of 2007–2011 as Colin Davis, remaining as the only original member of the band and a professional audio engineer (Imperial Mastering), dedicated himself to producing, recording and mastering.

Vile's fourth LP, Metamorphosis was released in late 2011 on Willowtip Records in North America and Hammerheart Records in Europe. The album's music and lyrics were written entirely by guitarist Colin Davis. The stylistic trend towards increasing melodies and standard song structuring continued. The band headlined a European tour in 2012, and played the West Coast and Japan in 2013. The band is currently on hiatus as founding member Davis is involved in a multi genre act called The 01EXPERIENCE.

== Band Members ==
=== Current members ===
- Colin E. Davis – guitar
- Mike Hrubocvak – vocals
- Michael Poggione – bass
- Thomas Luijken – 2nd guitar – (Europe)
- Justin Sakogawa – 2nd guitar – (U.S.)
- Tyson Jupin – drums – (U.S.)
- Timo Häkkinen – drums – (Europe)

=== Former Members ===
- Juan Urteaga – vocals
- Aaron Strong – guitar
- Jim Tkacz – guitar
- J.J. Hrubovcak – guitar
- Luke Jaeger – guitar
- Matt Faivre – bass
- Jeff Hughell – bass
- Mike Hamilton – drums
- Reno Kiillerich – drums
- Lance Wright – drums
- Marco Pitruzzella – drums

== Discography ==
- Unearthed (demo/1996)
- Vile-ation (demo/1997)
- Stench of the Deceased (1999) Listenable Records (2003)
- Depopulate (2002) Unique Leader – Listenable Records
- The New Age of Chaos (2005) Unique Leader – Listenable Records
- Metamorphosis (2011) Willowtip Records – Hammerheart Records
- Rare Tracks 1996 - 2004 (2012) Hammerheart Records
