= Disgorge (American band) =

American death metal band

- Origin: San Diego, California
- Genres: Brutal death metal
- Years active: 1992–2006
- Labels: Crash Music Inc.; Unique Leader
- Members: Angel Ochoa; Ed Talorda; Diego Soria; Diego Sanchez; Ricky Myers
- Past members: Bryan Ugartechea; Nate Twyman; Levi Fuselier; Eric Flesy; Tony Freithoffer; A.J. Magana; Ben Marlin; Matti Way

Disgorge was an American brutal death metal band from San Diego, California, formed in 1992.

== History ==
Bryan Ugartechea, Tony Freithoffer and Ricky Myers formed Disgorge in 1992. The same year, they released their first demo, Cognitive Lust of Mutilation, before moving to San Diego, California to establish themselves in the underground scene. During the move, the band parted ways with bassist/vocalist Ugartechea. New vocalist Matti Way and bassist Eric Flesy were recruited to fill Ugartechea's dual role. The band wrote new material for their second demo, which was released in 1995 and distributed worldwide. Disgorge played many shows throughout 1995 to broaden their fan base, and in 1996, recorded the first four tracks of Cranial Impalement, which was not released at the time but was later distributed by Extremities Productions.

In 1997, Freithoffer and Flesy left the band. Myers and Way began looking for replacements, whom they found in late 1998. Guitarist Diego Sanchez and bassist Ben Marlin of Strangulation, a local death metal band, joined Disgorge. Disgorge signed with Unique Leader Records, and released their full-length album, She Lay Gutted, in November 1999. After the release of that album, the band toured in Europe, North America and South America. Way quit the band in 2001 and was replaced with A.J. Magana, ex-vocalist of Deprecated.

Disgorge recorded their third album, Consume the Forsaken, with Magana as the vocalist. Magana parted ways with the band after recording and was replaced on tour with Jamie Bailey of Brodequin. Their fourth album, Parallels of Infinite Torture, featured new vocalist Levi Fuselier and guitarist Ed Talorda. Disgorge played in Japan, Australia, New Zealand, Thailand, Mexico, and Indonesia to support the album. The band appeared in the opening scene of the film Paranormal Activity, performing the song "Consume the Forsaken". In 2006, the band went on hiatus after bassist Ben Marlin was diagnosed with cancer. On January 2, 2008, Marlin died, aged 31, after battling cancer for more than a year and a half.

Sanchez, Talorda, and Way, along with Oscar Ramirez and Scott Ellis of Warface, formed To Violently Vomit, a Disgorge tribute band. Magana performed vocals for a few shows, as did Angel Ochoa of Condemned. They debuted on September 11, 2009, at The Jumping Turtle in San Marcos, California, and continued playing in the southern California area.

In May 2011, Myers announced that Disgorge was working on a new album, tentively titled And the Weak Shall Perish. The new lineup included Fuselier, Myers, Erik Lindmark of Deeds of Flesh, and Derek Boyer of Suffocation and Decrepit Birth. This album never surfaced.

On May 7, 2013, Disgorge announced a new deal with Extreme Management Group Inc, and a new touring and recording line-up comprising Ricky Myers, Diego Soria, Angel Ochoa, Ed Talorda, and Diego Sanchez. By 2019, only a few new tracks had surfaced, being played live on a few occasions. That same year, Myers joined New York band Suffocation as vocalist, putting Disgorge on hold. Since then, To Violently Vomit has reformed and continues to play live shows.

== Band name ==
There are and have been a number of other bands named Disgorge; hailing from Argentina, Germany, Mexico, Netherlands, Norway and Sweden.

== Band members ==
- Ricky Myers – drums (1992–present)
- Diego Sanchez – guitars (1998–present)
- Ed Talorda – guitars (2004–present)
- Diego Soria – bass (2013–present)
- Angel Ochoa – vocals (2013–present)

Former members

- Brian Ugartechea – bass, Vocals (1992–1995)
- Tony Freithoffer – guitars (1992–1997)
- David Hill – guitars (1994–1995)
- Matti Way – vocals (1994–2001)
- Eric Flesley – bass (1995–1997)
- John Remmen – guitars (1995–1996)
- Derek Boyer – bass (1996, 2011–2012)
- Ben Marlin – bass (1998–2008; died 2008)
- A.J. Magana – vocals (2000–2002, Live 2013)
- Shawn Whitaker - Guitar (2000)
- Levi Fuselier – vocals (2003–2011)
- Brad Kole – guitars (2011–2012)
- Erik Lindmark – guitars (2011–2012)
- Oscar Ramirez – bass (2012–2013)
- Shane Washington – bass (2012)
- Nate Twyman – vocals (2012–2013)

Live members

- Jamie Bailey - Vocals (2002)
- Ron Casey - Drums (2011)

== Discography ==
=== Albums ===
- Cranial Impalement (1998)
- She Lay Gutted (1999)
- Consume the Forsaken (2002)
- Parallels of Infinite Torture (2005)

=== Demos ===
- Cognitive Lust of Mutilation (1992)
- Demo 1995 (1995)
