= Waking the Cadaver =

American brutal death metal band

- Also known as: Death to Honor
- Origin: Jersey Shore, New Jersey, U.S.
- Genres: Brutal death metal, deathcore (early)
- Years active: 2004–2013, 2018–present
- Labels: Necroharmonic; Candlelight; Siege of Amida; Amputated Vein; Unique Leader
- Members: Don Campan; Preston Yanes; Kadin Hodgman; Sam Burns
- Past members: Steve Vermilyea; Nick Palmateer; Jerry Regen; Tristan Graham; Alex Castrillon; Michael Mayo; Dennis Morgan; John Hartman; Alex Sarnecki; Matt Crismond; Tim Carey; Michael Thomas

Waking the Cadaver is an American brutal death metal band from Sayreville, New Jersey, formed in 2006. Originally called Death to Honor, the band released one demo in 2004 before changing their name to Waking the Cadaver in 2006. The band has released four albums: Perverse Recollections of a Necromangler (2007), Beyond Cops, Beyond God (2010), Real-Life Death (2013), and Authority Through Intimidation (2021). They are now signed to Unique Leader Records.

== History ==
The band formed in January 2006 in Shore Points, New Jersey. They released a two-song demo, Demo 2006. Its two tracks, "Chased Through the Woods by a Rapist" and "Blood Splattered Satisfaction", were both later re-recorded.

On November 21, 2007, their debut album, Perverse Recollections of a Necromangler, was released on Necrohamonic Records.

On August 10, 2010, they released their second full-length album, Beyond Cops. Beyond God. and supported it with tours with death metal bands such as Napalm Death and Immolation.

On January 19, 2013, the band released a new single, "Lumped Up". They announced plans to release a new album, Real-Life Death. Real-Life Death was released digitally and sold at the band's live concert shows on October 5, 2013, and was released in stores November 5, 2013.

Their fourth album Authority Through Intimidation was released October 22, 2021.

== Musical style ==
Waking the Cadaver has been described as brutal death metal, particularly its slam death metal offshoot. The band has also been described as deathcore.

== Discography ==
Albums

- Perverse Recollections of a Necromangler (2007)
- Beyond Cops, Beyond God (2010)
- Real-Life Death (2013)
- Authority Through Intimidation (2021)

Demos

- Demo 2006 (2006)

Compilations

- Straight Outta tha Ground Vol. 1 (In tha Ground Records) – (2007)

== Members ==
Current

- Don Campan – vocals (2006–2013, 2018–present)
- Kadin Hodgman - guitar (2025-present)
- Anthony Cossu – bass (2024–present)
- Preston Yanes - drums (2025-present)

Former

- Nick Palmateer – guitar (2006–2008)
- Jerry Regan – guitar (2006–2008)
- Steve Vermilyea – bass (2006–2011)
- Dennis Morgan – drums (2006–2013)
- Tristan Graham – guitar (2007)
- Alex Castrillon – guitar (2008–2009)
- Mike Mayo – guitar (2008–2013, 2018–2024)
- John Hartman – guitar (2011–2013)
- Alex Sarnecki – bass (2012–2013)
- Matt Crismond – drums (2018–2020)
- Tim Carey – guitar (2018–2021)
- Chris Kulak – drums (2020–2021)
- Michael Thomas – bass (2018–2024)
- Ray Suhy – guitar (2024–2025)
- Marco Pitruzzella – drums (2021–2025)
