= Dying Fetus =

American death metal band

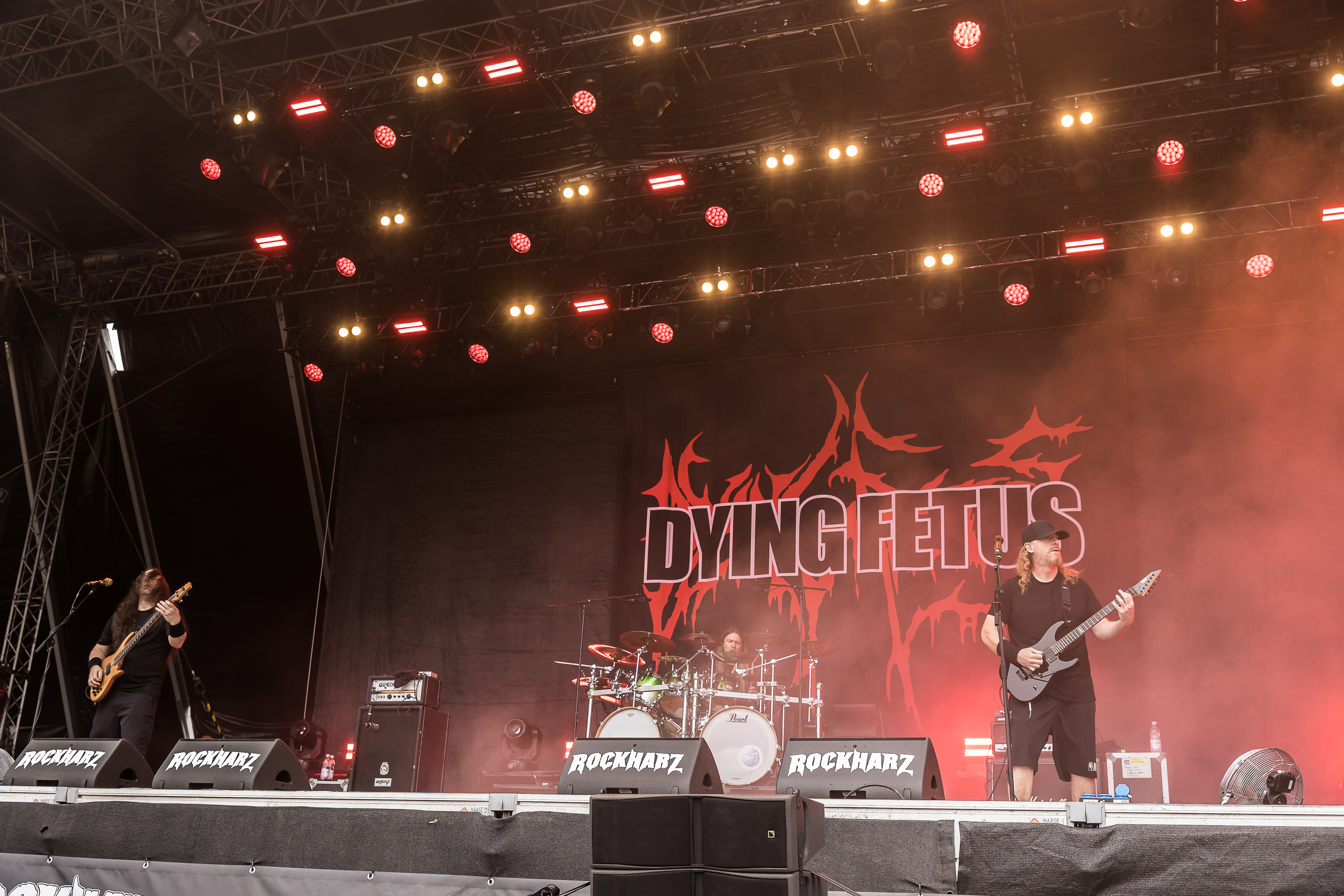
- Dying Fetus performing at Rockharz 2024

Background information
- Origin: Greater Upper Marlboro, Maryland, U.S.
- Genres: Brutal death metal; technical death metal; grindcore (early)
- Years active: 1991–present
- Label: Relapse
- Spinoffs: Misery Index; Criminal Element
- Members: John Gallagher; Sean Beasley; Trey Williams
- Past members: Jason Netherton; Rob Belton; Brian Latta; Eric Sayenga; Kevin Talley; Sparky Voyles; Vince Matthews; Duane Timlin; Mike Kimball
- Website: dyingfetusband.com

Dying Fetus is an American death metal band from Greater Upper Marlboro, Maryland, formed in 1991. Lineup changes throughout the years have left John Gallagher as the sole remaining original member and the band's driving force. According to Gallagher, the band name was chosen while the members were young and was intended to be offensive. To date, Dying Fetus has released nine studio albums.

== History ==
=== Beginnings (1991–1996) ===
John Gallagher (guitar, vocals) and Jason Netherton (bass, vocals) founded Dying Fetus in 1991 in Upper Marlboro, Maryland. The band began in earnest when the pair met guitarist/vocalist Nick Speleos in 1992. They decided that Gallagher would play drums until they found a proper drummer. The writing of this period resulted in the 1993 demo Bathe In Entrails. In late 1993, the band found drummer Rob Belton and guitarist Brian Latta, who replaced the departing Nick Speleos (which reverted Gallagher to guitarist and vocalist). The four-piece recorded the Infatuation with Malevolence demo in early 1994, later released together with the first demo in 1995 as a compilation on California Indie label Wild Rags Records. Songs included all tracks from both demos as one CD.

In 1996, the band released their first album, Purification through Violence, on Illinois label Pulverizer Records. The album further refined the band's developing death metal riffing, combined with heavy slams, over seven original songs, and one Napalm Death cover, "Scum". Belton left and drummer Casey Buckler joined the band in 1995 for a year. They performed live but never recorded with Buckler. He was asked to leave the band as they agreed he would play drums for a tour they had that year.

=== Rise to underground prominence (1996–2000) ===
Relying on self-promotion, the band toured sporadically for four years starting in summer 1996 with their first full US tour alongside Kataklysm and Monstrosity, with the first appearance of future drummer Erik Sayenga replacing Buckler. By spring 1997, Sayenga left the band. During a short Texas tour in May 1997, they found drummer Kevin Talley, who joined full-time by the summer of 1997. The band caught the attention of German indie label Morbid Records, who signed them early in 1998 for a one-album deal. Almost immediately afterwards, the band released their second album, Killing on Adrenaline.

Morbid Records supplied the band with modest promotion in the death metal underground by releasing the album in Europe (while the band released it on their own label, Blunt Force Records, in North America). They rose to prominence with live performances, such as appearances at Milwaukee metalfest (1998-2000) and tours in the US and Canada in 1998 (with Deeds of Flesh) and in Europe (with Deranged). Guitarist Brian Latta left the band in late 1998, replaced with "Sparky" Voyles. In 1999, the band embarked on their first headlining tour of the US, over three weeks, dubbed the "Underground Terrorism" tour. The tour was followed by the Grotesque Impalement EP, which the band released on their Blunt Force Records label imprint.

=== Relapse Records and new lineup (2000–2003) ===
By 2000, Dying Fetus caught the attention of underground metal label Relapse Records, who signed the band.

Returning to Steve Carr's Hit and Run Studios in Maryland (where each previous Dying Fetus album was recorded), Dying Fetus recorded their Relapse debut and overall third full-length album, Destroy the Opposition, in the spring of 2000. This album featured stronger political themes. The songwriting would influence the "deathcore" scene in subsequent years. The album was included in Decibel's Top 100 Albums of the decade list for the 2000s (Decibel Magazine Special Edition, December 2009), as well as to Decibel's "Hall of Fame" (#89, July 2012).

Following the release of Destroy the Opposition, original member Jason Netherton left the band for personal reasons. Guitarist Voyles and drummer Talley left the band months after the album's release. They went on to form Misery Index. Gallagher recruited guitarist Mike Kimball, singer Vince Matthews, bassist/backup vocalist Sean Beasley, and the returning Sayenga on drums.

The new lineup released the band's fourth album, Stop at Nothing, in 2003, featuring Carr's production and strong political themes. A promotional video was shot for the track "One Shot, One Kill".

=== Lineup changes, return to form (2003–present) ===
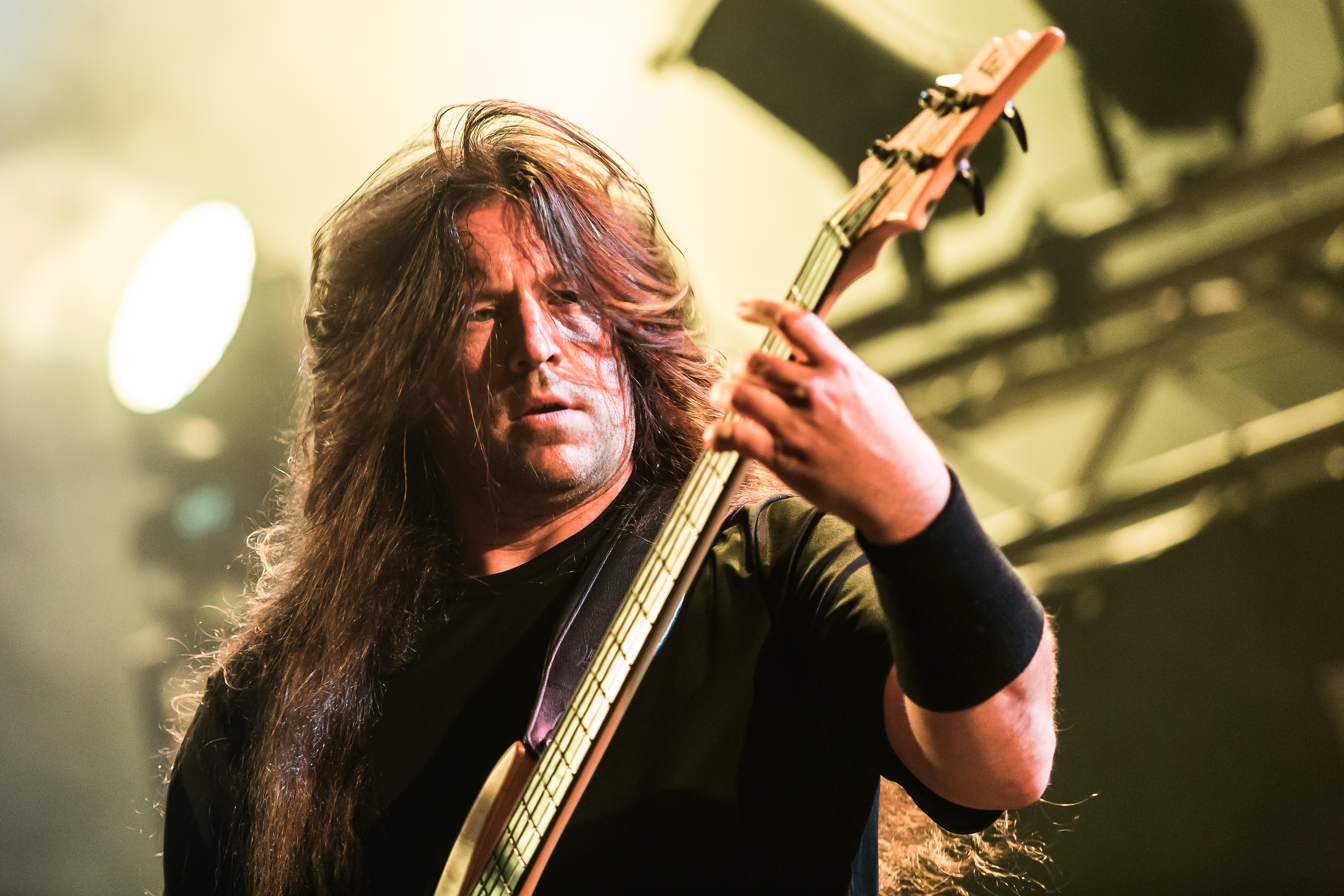
Bassist Sean Beasley joined the band in 2001 and has been one half of Dying Fetus' dual vocalist setup since 2004.

Dying Fetus toured extensively for Stop at Nothing, and got airplay for the music video for "One Shot, One Kill" on Headbanger's Ball. Another vehicle that led to exposure of the band was further support from Relapse Records (with acts such as Mastodon gaining popularity), as well as a full North American tour with Gwar in 2005. The Stop at Nothing lineup dissolved slightly in the years that followed. Sayenga parted again, and singer Vince Matthews went on to form Criminal Element. Bassist Beasley took over on vocals, and drummer Duane Timlin (ex-Divine Empire/Broken Hope) joined in 2006.

That lineup recorded War of Attrition, released in March 2007. Themes include reality TV, the war on terrorism, racial ignorance, and the flaws in the criminal justice system. Songs include "Homicidal Retribution", "Raping the System", and "Parasites of Catastrophe". Dying Fetus' second music video was made for "Homicidal Retribution".

In July 2007, drummer Duane Timlin was fired due to incompatibilities. The new drummer was Trey Williams, from Baltimore band Severed Head. Mike Kimball left the band, which has remained a trio since.

On September 15, 2009, Dying Fetus released their sixth album, Descend into Depravity on Relapse Records. The follow-up, Reign Supreme, was released on June 19, 2012. The band released the first single from the album, "Subjected to a Beating", on April 2, 2012.

Dying Fetus headlined a US tour supported by Exhumed, Abiotic and Waking the Cadaver. Devourment was intended to play the tour, but dropped off a month beforehand. Rivers of Nihil appeared in select spots.

On November 4, 2013, after Avenged Sevenfold were announced as a headliner for Download Festival 2014, Internet fans started complaining that other bands were more deserving of a headline spot at the festival, such as Machine Head, Lamb of God, Testament, Dying Fetus, and Carcass. This sparked a mock internet campaign with the hashtag "#WhyNotDyingFetus?" trending worldwide. On November 6, 2013, Andy Copping announced on his Twitter feed that due to the internet campaign, Dying Fetus had been confirmed to play at the festival. The band were the first to play the main stage on the Saturday.

By June 2016, Dying Fetus had been working on their eighth studio album, expected to be released in the summer of 2017.

By mid-April 2017, the band and Relapse Records announced via social media the release of their eighth studio album, Wrong One to Fuck With, released on June 23, 2017, and including a promotional video for Gallagher, Williams, Beasley, and Associates – Death Metal Attorneys at Law.

In 2019, the band's music was featured on the South Park episode "Band in China".

Dying Fetus toured with Suicide Silence in 2023. In the fall of that year, they toured North America with the Acacia Strain, Despised Icon, Creeping Death and Tactosa.

The band are confirmed to be making an appearance at Welcome to Rockville, which will take place in Daytona Beach, Florida in May 2026.

== Musical style and legacy ==
Dying Fetus has been described as death metal, grindcore, brutal death metal, and technical death metal, incorporating elements of each into their musical style. Their sound is noted for its "vicious" blast beats as well as the guttural vocal style of frontman John Gallagher. Eduardio Rivadavia of AllMusic said the band had "a knack for locating the sweet spot between blastbeats, guttural vocals, and hooks."

Loudwire states that singer John Gallagher has used "gurgles" in his vocal performances, which the publication describes as being at "weird intersection of black metal croaking and deathcore growling."

In 2021, Mike Rampton of Kerrang named Dying Fetus the second "most offensive band name of all time." He wrote: "Dying Fetus formed when still in high school, which explains the name – they were just trying to be as offensive as they could."

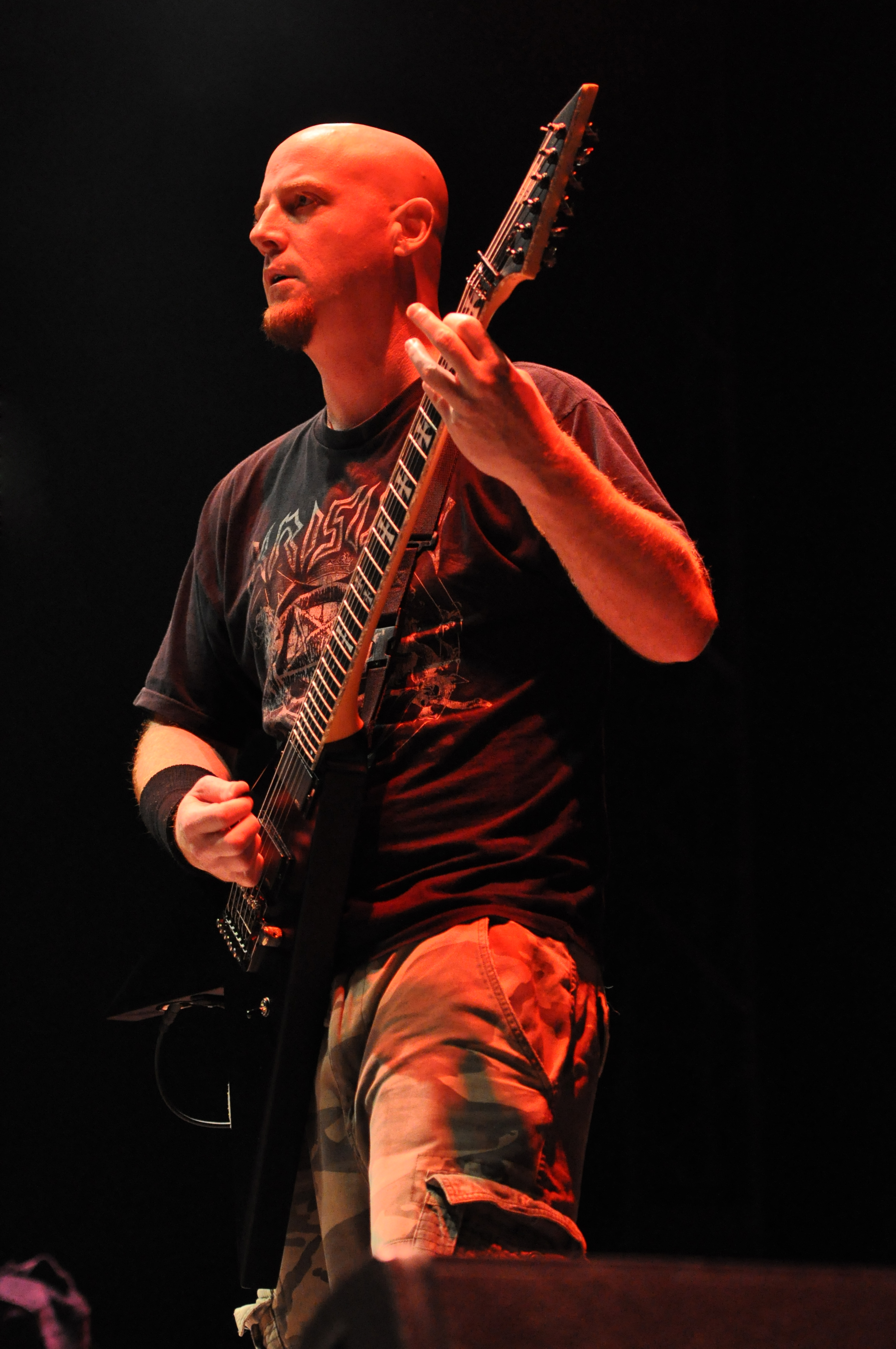
Guitarist and founding member John Gallagher

== Members ==
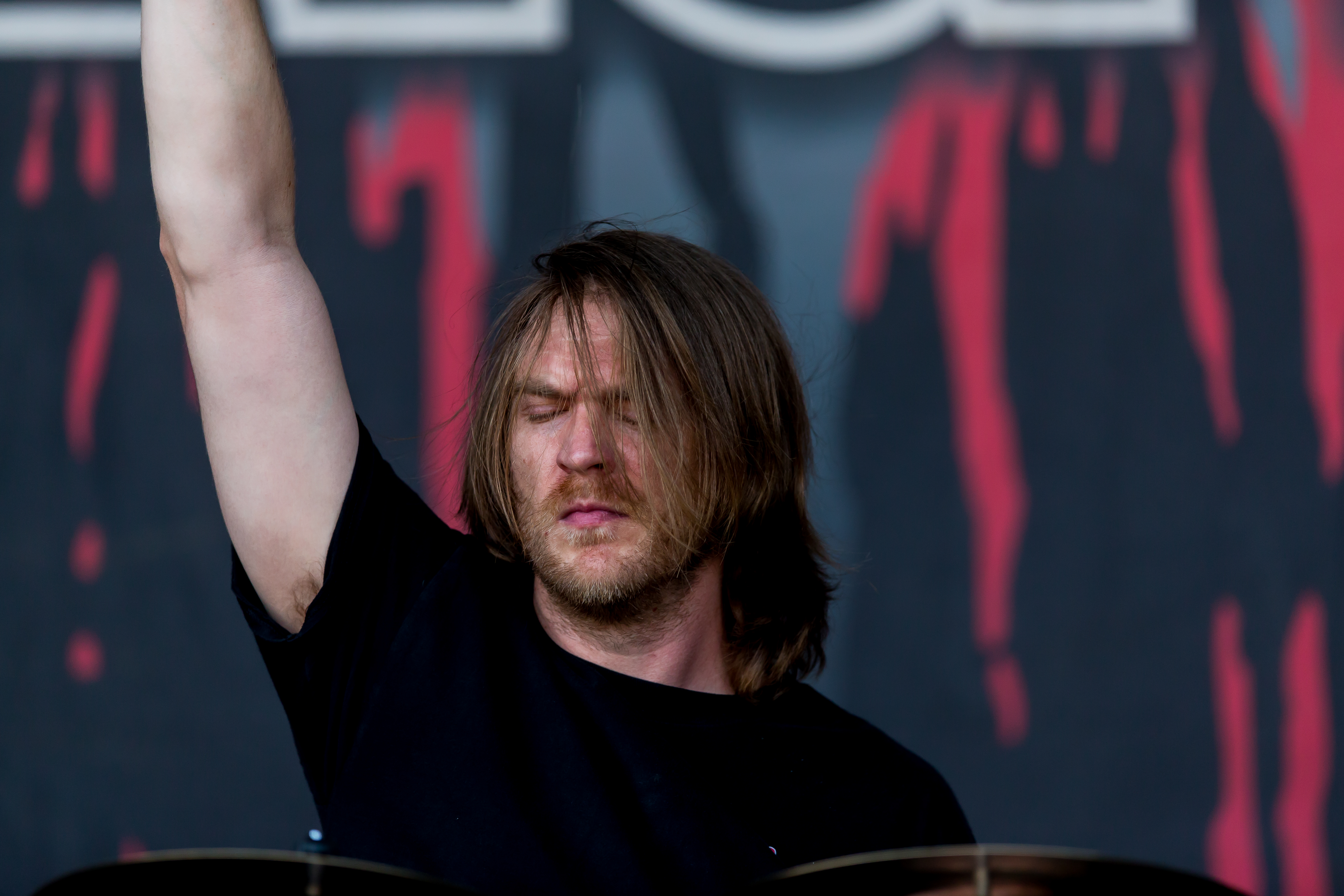
Drummer Trey Williams

Current members

- John Gallagher – vocals, guitar (1991–present), drums (1991–1994)
- Sean Beasley – bass (2001–present), vocals (2004–present)
- Trey Williams – drums (2007–present)

Former members

- Nick Speleos – guitar, vocals (1991–1994)
- Rob Belton – drums (1994–1997)
- Brian Latta – guitar (1994–1999)
- Jason Netherton – bass, vocals (1991–2000)
- Kevin Talley – drums (1997–2001)
- John "Sparky" Voyles – guitar (1999–2001)
- Bruce Greig – guitar (2001–2002; died 2022)
- Vince Matthews – vocals (2001–2004)
- Erik Sayenga – drums (2001–2005)
- Duane Timlin – drums (2006–2007)
- Mike Kimball – guitar (2003–2008)

Former touring musicians

- Casey Buckler – drums (1995–1996; substitute for Rob Belton)
- Erik Sayenga – drums (1996–1997; substitute for Rob Belton)
- John Longstreth – drums (2004; substitute for Erik Sayenga)

Timeline

== Discography ==
=== Studio albums ===
List of studio albums, with selected chart positions
| Title | Album details | Peak chart positions | | | |
| Title | Album details | US | US Heat. | US Indie | US Hard Rock |
|---|---|---|---|---|---|
| Purification Through Violence | Released: August 6, 1996; Label: Pulverizer | — | — | — | — |
| Killing on Adrenaline | Released: July 27, 1998; Label: Morbid | — | — | — | — |
| Destroy the Opposition | Released: October 3, 2000; Label: Relapse | — | — | — | — |
| Stop at Nothing | Released: May 13, 2003; Label: Relapse | — | — | — | — |
| War of Attrition | Released: March 6, 2007; Label: Relapse | — | 25 | — | — |
| Descend into Depravity | Released: September 15, 2009; Label: Relapse | 168 | 4 | 28 | 24 |
| Reign Supreme | Released: June 19, 2012; Label: Relapse | 186 | 3 | 34 | 14 |
| Wrong One to Fuck With | Released: June 23, 2017; Label: Relapse | 180 | 2 | 7 | 8 |
| Make Them Beg for Death | Released: September 8, 2023; Label: Relapse | — | — | — | — |
"—" denotes a recording that did not chart.

=== Compilation albums ===
| Title | Album details |
|---|---|
| Infatuation with Malevolence | Released: 1995; Label: Wild Rags; Formats: CD, digital download |

=== Video albums ===
| Title | Album details |
|---|---|
| Killing on Live | Released: 2002; Label: Mort Productions; Formats: VCD |

=== EPs ===
| Title | Album details |
|---|---|
| Grotesque Impalement | Released: 2000; Label: Blunt Force; Formats: CD, vinyl, digital download |
| History Repeats... | Released: July 19, 2011; Label: Relapse Records; Formats: CD, vinyl, digital download |

=== Demos ===
| Title | Album details |
|---|---|
| Bathe in Entrails | Released: 1993; Label: Self-released; Formats: Cassette |
| Infatuation with Malevolence | Released: May 1994; Label: Self-released; Formats: Cassette |

=== Music videos ===
| Title | Year | Directed |
|---|---|---|
| We Are Your Enemy | 1998 | — |
| Kill Your Mother/Rape Your Dog | 1998 | — |
| One Shot, One Kill | 2003 | Kip Bissell |
| Homicidal Retribution | 2007 | Frank Huang |
| Shepherd's Commandment | 2009 | Kevin Custer |
| Your Treachery Will Die with You | 2010 | Kevin Custer |
| From Womb to Waste | 2012 | Scott Hansen |
| Second Skin | 2013 | Jakob Arevarn |
| Fixated on Devastation | 2017 | Mitch Massie |
| Die With Integrity | 2017 | Mitch Massie |
| Panic Amongst the Herd | 2017 | Mount Emult |
| Wrong One to Fuck With | 2018 | James Pesature |
| Compulsion for Cruelty | 2022 | Eric DiCarlo |
| Unbridled Fury | 2023 | Eric Richter |
| Feast of Ashes | 2023 | Blvckbox Studios |
| Throw Them in the Van | 2024 | Chris Joao |
