= Deeds of Flesh =

American brutal death metal band

- Origin: Los Osos, California
- Genres: Brutal death metal, technical death metal
- Years active: 1993–present
- Label: Unique Leader Records
- Members: Craig Peters; Ivan Manguia; Jacoby Kingston; Mike Hamilton
- Past members: Erik Lindmark; Joey Heaslet; Brad Palmer; Jimmy Tkacz; Jared Deaver; Sean Southern; Erlend Caspersen; Corey Athos; Darren Cecsa

Deeds of Flesh is an American brutal death metal band from Los Osos, California, U.S. They were formed in 1993 by Jacoby Kingston, Erik Lindmark (1972–2018) and Joey Heaslet. They founded the label Unique Leader Records, which has become home to a number of death metal bands from around the world. Deeds of Flesh have released nine studio albums. Their most recent, Nucleus, was released in 2020.

== Overview ==
=== Brief history ===
Deeds of Flesh formed in 1993. They signed to Wild Rags Records and released their first EP, Gradually Melted. They moved to the now-defunct Repulse Records, and released their first full-length album, Trading Pieces, in 1996.

Two years later, in 1998, they released a second album, Inbreeding the Anthropophagi, on the same label, with Brad Palmer replacing Joey Heaslet on drums. After this album was recorded, guitarist Jim Tkacz joined the band. The band lost their contract with the label and self-released a demo. After this, they formed the label Unique Leader Records. All their subsequent records were released on this label. The band released the DVD Deeds of Flesh: Live In Montreal in 2005.

In 2007, founding member and bassist Jacoby Kingston announced he was leaving the band due to lifestyle changes. He was replaced with Erlend Caspersen.

In Summer 2012, Erik Lindmark was diagnosed with tendonitis, leading to a touring hiatus. The band's eighth full-length, Portals to Canaan, was released on June 25, 2013.

On November 29, 2018, 46-year-old frontman Erik Lindmark died from sclerosis.

On September 28, 2020, the band announced a new album, Nucleus, released on December 11. It was the band's first album without Lindmark, though it features music he wrote and recorded prior to his death. It was announced that former bassist and vocalist Jacoby Kingston had rejoined the band solely as vocalist. Former drummer Mike Hamilton also contributed to the album. The album features guest vocals from many death metal vocalists, including Luc Lemay of Gorguts, John Gallagher of Dying Fetus, George "Corpsegrinder" Fisher of Cannibal Corpse, Frank Mullen of Suffocation, Matti Way of Disgorge, Bill Robinson of Decrepit Birth, Anthony Trapani of Odious Mortem, Obie Flett of Pathology, Robbe Kok of Disavowed, Dusty Boisjolie of Severed Savior, and Jon Zig of Serpentian.

=== Tours ===
Deeds of Flesh has toured extensively over the past decade. After the release of Mark of the Legion, the band supported Monstrosity on the "Bloodletting North America Pt. II" Tour. A year later, in 2002, they toured with Disgorge and Dutch death metallers Severe Torture and Disavowed on the Bloodletting North America Part III tour. The band performed a number of shows with Cannibal Corpse.

In 2004, the band toured with such American death metal acts as Dying Fetus and Hate Eternal. They toured Australia with Tasmanian death metal group Psycroptic.

After sitting out much of 2005 due to injuries to Jacoby Kingston and Mike Hamilton, the band started touring again in 2006. They toured Europe with Monstrosity, Vile, and Impaled, then toured North America with Decrepit Birth, Vile, and Odious Mortem.

== Musical style ==
Their music can be described as influenced by the brutal death metal style pioneered by Suffocation and the technical approach of bands like Morbid Angel and Cannibal Corpse coupled with a songwriting style that incorporates numerous abrupt changes in meter and tempo, creating a disorienting atmosphere to the listener. The guitar riffs themselves tend to be atonal, albeit often minor or diminished, mixtures of palm-muting, fast tremolo picking, and slam riffs. The drum parts also change frequently, mirroring the constantly shifting nature of the guitar lines. The vocals are a mixture of low growls and high screams. On former albums, the low-pitched vocals were performed by Lindmark, and the high-pitched vocals by Kingston. After Kingston's departure, Lindmark undertook all vocal duties before his death on November 29, 2018.

Deeds of Flesh did not implement guitar solos until their 2008 release Of What's to Come, on which there are many, performed by then-new guitarist Sean Southern.

Their lyrical content deals with themes common to death metal, such as gore, murder, disease and horror. Of What's To Come was a stylistic departure from this as a concept album that dealt with post-apocalyptic and science fiction themes.

== Members ==
=== Current members ===
- Craig Peters – guitars (2011–present)
- Ivan Munguia – guitars (2021–present), bass (2012–2021)
- Jacoby Kingston – vocals (1993–2007, 2020–present), bass (1993–1998, 1998–2007, 2021–present)
- Mike Hamilton – drums (1999–2016, 2021–present)

=== Former members ===
- Erik Lindmark – vocals, guitars (1993–2018) (died 2018)
- Joey Heaslet – drums (1993–1996, 1998–1999)
- Brad Palmer – drums (1996–1998)
- Jimmy Tkacz – guitars (1998–1999)
- Jared Deaver – guitars (1999–2001)
- Sean Southern – guitars (2005–2011)
- Erlend Caspersen – bass (2007–2012)
- Corey Athos – vocals (2011–2012)
- Darren Cecsa – drums (2016–2021)

== Discography ==
- Trading Pieces (1996)
- Inbreeding the Anthropophagi (1998)
- Path of the Weakening (1999)
- Mark of the Legion (2001)
- Reduced to Ashes (2003)
- Crown of Souls (2005)
- Of What's to Come (2008)
- Portals to Canaan (2013)
- Nucleus (2020)
