= Johan Reinholdz =

Swedish guitarist

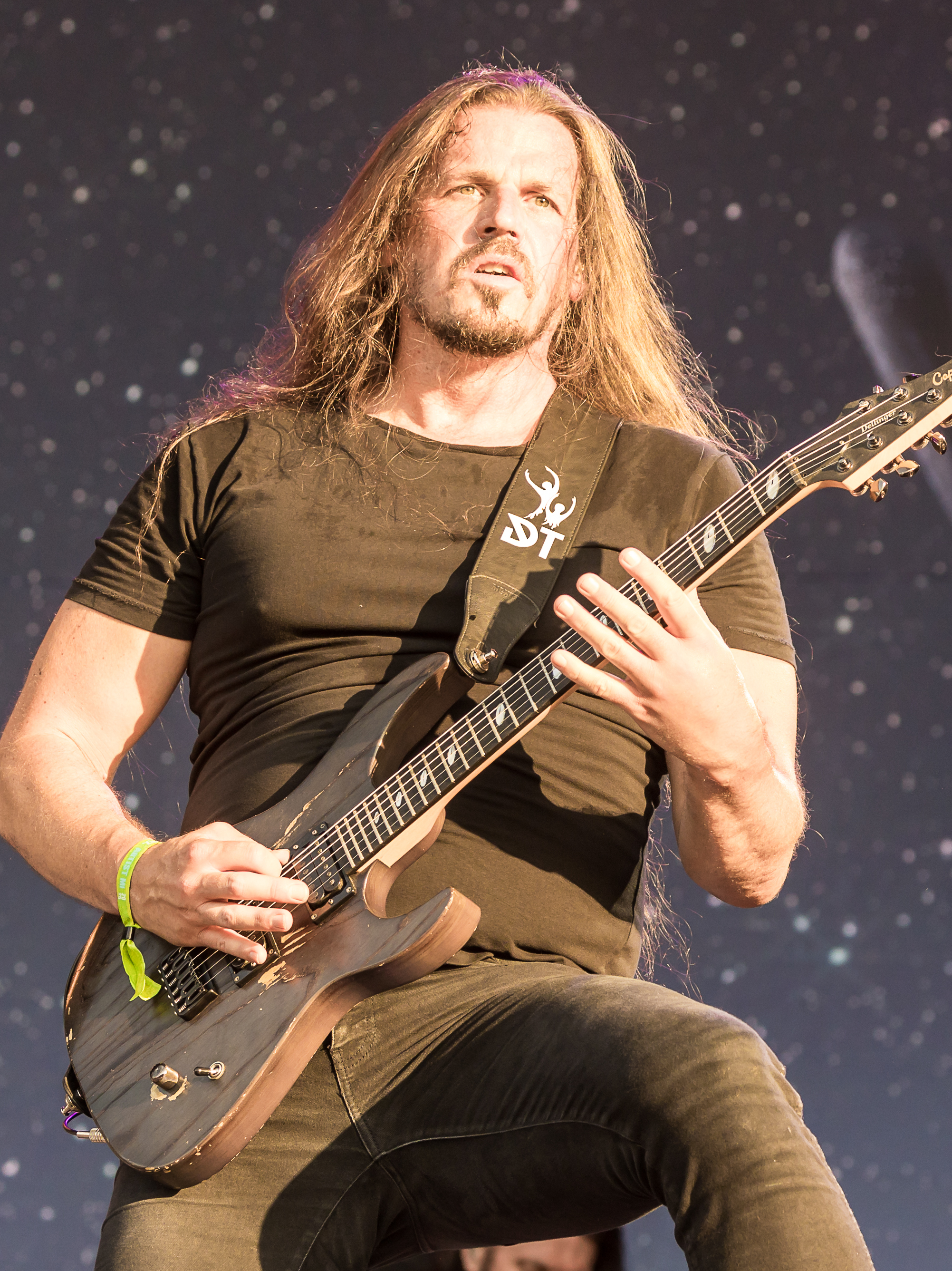
- Reinholdz with Dark Tranquillity in 2025

Background information
- Born: 30 June 1980 (age 46)
- Origin: Höör, Sweden
- Genres: Melodic death metal, progressive metal, heavy metal, thrash metal, electronica, synth, ambient
- Occupations: Musician, songwriter
- Instruments: Guitar, vocals, bass, synth/electronics/programming
- Years active: 1993–present

Johan Reinholdz (born 30 June 1980) is a Swedish guitarist known for his work with the progressive metal band Andromeda, and melodic death metal bands Dark Tranquillity, NonExist and Skyfire. He composed Andromeda's debut album, Extension of the Wish, as well as much of its other material. He has also released four more studio albums with Andromeda and two live albums. In 2004, Reinholdz joined Skyfire and made his album debut on Esoteric in 2009. Since early 2017, he has played with Dark Tranquillity.

== Biography ==
Reinholdz was born on 30 June 1980 in Höör. He first picked up the guitar at the age of nine, inspired mainly by Kee Marcello and Europe. Later he discovered heavy metal by listening to bands such as Metallica, Megadeth, Sepultura, AC/DC, Iron Maiden, Slayer, Morbid Angel and Pantera. He then started playing with his friends in some local bands such as Morbid Demons, Widow, Dark Desires and Crimson Tears. Widow released three demos and played local gigs.

Over time, several more musical influences were added to his musical interest. Artists like the Sisters of Mercy, Yngwie Malmsteen, The Cure, Allan Holdsworth, Yes, Emerson, Lake & Palmer, Dream Theater, Genesis, Atheist, Marillion, and classical music and jazz/fusion as well.

In 1998 he recorded two solo-demos which found their way to WAR-music (later reformed as New Hawen Records) boss Bengt "Wez" Wenedikter. Andromeda and Nonexist were then born as Wenedikter offered Reinholdz two record deals in 1999. Some of the riffs from the 1998 demo "Welcome to Forever" were used on Andromeda debut album Extension of the Wish and the bandname was lifted from the last track of the demo "A Postcard from Andromeda". Andromeda has released five studio-albums and one live-DVD. The band is currently writing songs for album number six which will be recorded early 2016. A second live-DVD – "Live in Vietnam" was also released in 2016.

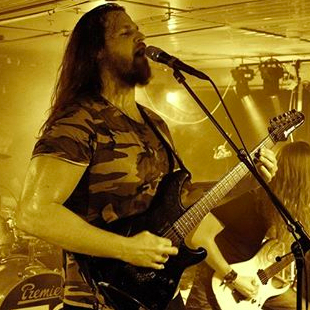
Reinholdz singing with NonExist in 2015

The first Nonexist album Deus Deceptor came out in 2002 and in 2011 Reinholdz started writing the second Nonexist album From My Cold Dead Hands. It was then recorded in 2011/2012 with Johan Liiva back on vocals, and released by Pivotal Rockordings in November 2012 and by Japanese label Trooper Entertainment in May 2013. This album was the debut as a producer for Reinholdz, doing all the mixing, producing and mastering himself. The band made their live-debut at the Scorched Tundra Festival in Gothenburg, December 2012. In 2014, Nonexist started recording album number three entitled Throne of Scars. It features nine tracks and is produced and mixed by Johan Reinholdz at Multipass Studios with the assistance of Markus Nilsson at Sunnanå Studio in Malmö. The style of the songs retain the atmosphere from the previous album; dark, intense, varied and heavy while also adding some new influences in the mix. Throne of Scars was mixed and ready in April 2015 and during the same time the band signed a deal with Danish label Mighty Music. The album was released in Japan by Trooper Entertainment, in August and in the rest of the world by Mighty Music on 10 October 2015. Reinholdz has now taken over the vocal duties in Nonexist, doing both the guitar and vocals live. Johan Liiva quit the band in November 2015.

As of May 2019, Reinholdz is endorsed by Caparison Guitars.

Reinholdz started touring with Dark Tranquillity in 2017 alongside Christopher Amott (ex-Arch Enemy), as a touring replacement for founding member Niklas Sundin, who was taking a break from touring. On 30 March 2020, Reinholdz and Amott were announced as full member, officially replacing Sundin who had departed earlier that month.

== Equipment ==
- Caparison Deliinger II FX AM
- Caparison Deliinger II FX Prominence
- Caparison Brocken
- Caparison Deliinger II WB-FX
- Richter Straps
- Jim Dunlop Picks
- Kemper Amps
- Peavey Amps
- Line6 POD
- Yamaha practice Amps
- MesaBoogie 50/50 power amp
- Hughes & Kettner speaker cabinet

== Awards ==
- Swedish Grammis won for Moment Best Metal 2021
- Metal Hammer Germany Awards 2024:
- Dark Tranquillity - Unforgivable nominated for Metal Anthem 2024
- Dark Tranquillity - nominated for Best international band
- Dark Tranquillity - nominated for Best live band

== Discography ==
=== Morbid Demons ===
- Enter the Crypts of Hell (1993, demo)

=== Dark Desires ===
- Demo '94 (1994, demo)

=== Crimson Tears ===
- Eternal Scream (1995, demo)

=== Widow ===
- Reharsal demo '96 (1996, demo)
- Beyond (1996, demo)
- Will We Ever Know (1997, demo)
- Autumn Elegy (1998, demo)
- Waiting for Something (compilation album, featured song Archway of Fear) (1998, BlackTrack Music)

=== Solo ===
- Maiden Voyage (1998, demo)
- Welcome to Forever (1998, demo)
- Solipsism (2021, Reinholdz Recordings)
- Weightless and Numb (2022, Reinholdz Recordings)
- Iron Ghosts (2023, single, Reinholdz Recordings)
- Say (2023, single Reinholdz Recordings)
- Tears of the Mannquin (2023, single, Reinholdz Recordings)
- Tetragrammaton (2023, ep, Reinholdz Recordings)
- Say (Martin Jansson Remix) (2024, single, Reinholdz Recordings)
- Bad Moon Rising (2025, single, Reinholdz Recordings)
- Laura Palmer's Theme (2025, single, Reinholdz Recordings)

=== Andromeda ===
- Extension of the Wish (2001, WAR-music/Century Media Records/NTS/Pony Canyon)
- II=I (2003, New Hawen Records/Century Media)
- Extension of the Wish – Final Extension (2004, New Hawen Records/Century Media Records)
- Chimera (2006, Massacre Records)
- Playing off the Board (Live DVD) (2007, Metal Mind Productions)
- The Immunity Zone (2008, Nightmare Records)
- Manifest Tyranny (2011, Inner Wound Recordings)
- Live in Vietnam (Live DVD) (2016, Andromeda Recordings)

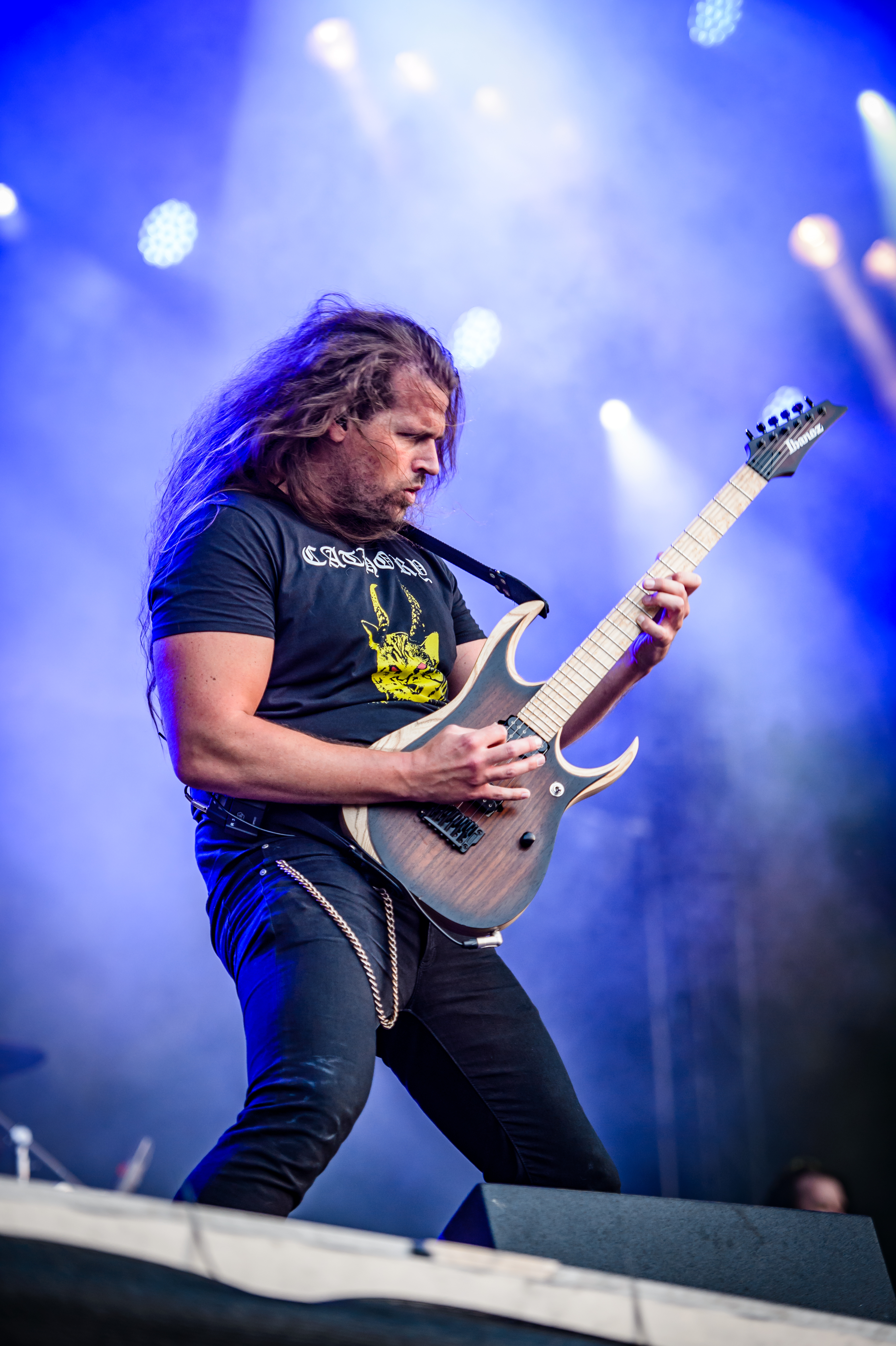
Reinholdz with Dark Tranquillity in 2017

=== Dark Tranquillity ===
- Moment (2020, Century Media Records)
- The Last Imagination (single, 2024, Century Media Records)
- Unforgivable (2024, single, Century Media Records)
- Not Nothing (2024, single, Century Media Records)
- Endtime Signals (2024, Century Media Records)

=== Nonexist ===
- Deus Deceptor (2002, New Hawen Records/Century Media Records/Toy's Factory)
- From My Cold Dead Hands (2012, Pivotal Rockordings/Trooper Entertainment)
- Throne of Scars (2015, Mighty Music/Trooper Entertainment)
- The New Flesh EP (2016, Reinholdz Recordings)
- Deus Deceptor (2017, Remaster/extended) (2017 Reinholdz Recordings)
- A Meditation Upon Death (2018, single Mighty Music)
- In Praise of Death EP (2018, Mighty Music)
- Strictly Sadistic Intent (single, 2020, Mighty Music)
- Together We Shall Burn (single, 2020, Mighty Music)
- Dark Satanic Mills (single, 2020, Mighty Music)
- Like the Fearless Hunter (2020, Mighty Music/Trooper Entertainment)

=== Opus Atlantica ===
- Opus Atlantica (2002, Regain Records)

=== Skyfire ===
- Fractal (ep, 2009, Pivotal Rockordings)
- Esoteric (2009, Pivotal Rockordings)
- Liberation in Death (2017, CFL Recordings)

=== Murdered Beats ===
- Silent Order (2017, Reinholdz Recordings)

=== Guest appearances ===
- Porr 00 – Detta är Sverige (demo) (2000) – guitar solo on Offer
- Anton – The Happy Prankster EP (2000, Mjäll/Slask Independent Media ) – synth on Junkland
- Skyfire – Timeless Departure (2001, Hammerheart Records) – co-writing credits on Fragments of Time
- 8 Point Rose – S/T (2010, Escape Music ) – guitar solo on Endless Rage
- #366: A Life Lived – Depressionism (2014, Records Union ) – remake/remix/guitars/bass/synths/vocals on Bullet for Thee
- Universal Mind Project – The Jaguar Priest (2016, Inner Wound Recordings) – guitar solo on The Force of our Creation
- Frayn – New (2016) – guitar solo on Stray
- Asymmetry – Fragility (2016) – guitar solo on Civil War
- F-Side Project – As One Entity (2017) – guitar solo on Mastermind
- Deathening – Antifascist Death Metal (2018, Rakamarow Records/Accelerator Records) – guitar solo on Evil and Spineless Cowards and guest vocals on Dehumanization
- Anton Johansson's – Nevertold Stories (2021, Lion Music) – guitar solo on End of a Friend
- Pine Cone Project – Seed (2023) – guitar solo on Dying Souls Pt.2
- Roger Stüssi – Beneath She Reigns (2026) – guitar solo
- Eradikated – Wiring of Violence (2026, Indie Recordings) – guitar solo production/consultation
- Fires in the Distance – Circadian Promise (2026, Prosthetic Records ) – guitar solo on By This Time Tomorrow

=== Other ===
- Music to Alice in Wonderland-theatrical production (2013, Theatre Thea, Malmö, Sweden)
- Betrayer – Too Loud (2013) – producer/engineer of the vocals on In My Heart
- Lynchland Members Mix#1 – Sa Salas (2016) – featured song on compilation.
- Metallic Kitty – Little Thunder – guitar/bass/keyboards and the writing credits to the music – (2016)
- Almtorget Crew – (film, 2017), Directed by Henrik Möller-Klas Noll/Videodirekt – supporting role as back-up thug
