= Johan Liiva =

Swedish metal vocalist (born 1970)

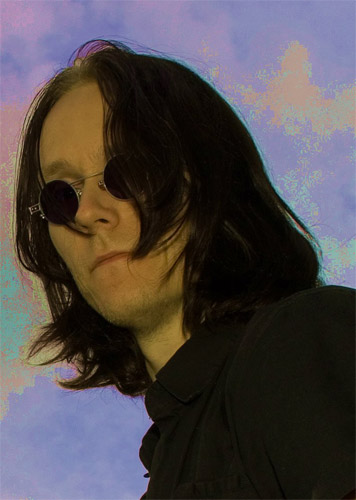
- Liiva in 2006

Background information
- Born: Johan Patrik Mattias Liiva; 18 November 1970 (age 55)
- Genres: Death metal, melodic death metal
- Occupation: Vocalist
- Years active: 1988–present

Johan Patrik Mattias Liiva (born 18 November 1970) is a Swedish extreme metal vocalist, most widely recognized as the co-founder of melodic death metal band Arch Enemy, as well as a former member of Carnage, Furbowl and NonExist. He is currently working as vocalist with Hearse.

== Career ==
=== Carnage ===
Liiva formed Carnage with his friend Michael Amott in 1988, and appeared on two demo tapes "The Day Man Lost" and "Infestation Of Evil", but left the band before their debut album was recorded in 1990. He went on to form Furbowl as a guitarist/vocalist, with Max Thornell on drums. The band released their debut album Those Shredded Dreams as a two-piece on Step One Records in 1992. The album also featured guest solos on two songs by Amott (who also produced the recording). Furbowl would add a guitarist, Nicklas Stenemo, and release their second full-length The Autumn Years in 1994 on Black Mark Production, but the project folded soon after.

=== Arch Enemy ===
After the demise of Furbowl in the mid 1990s, Liiva once again teamed up with Amott to form the band Arch Enemy in 1996. After releasing their first album Black Earth in Japan that same year, the album became a success, receiving airplay on Japan's MTV Rocks! and in 1998 Arch Enemy were invited to tour Japan, and sign a new deal with Toy's Factory records. Arch Enemy released Stigmata worldwide in 1998, and the band toured for the first time. In 1999, the band released Burning Bridges, and Burning Japan Live 1999, the latter proved to be Liiva's last album with Arch Enemy.

=== After Arch Enemy ===
After parting ways with Arch Enemy in November 2000, Liiva went on to form the band NonExist with guitarist Johan Reinholdz (Andromeda), and drummer Matte Modin (Dark Funeral, Defleshed). The band released three albums with Liiva on vocals, Deus Deceptor, From My Cold Dead Hands & Throne of Scars, before parting ways in November 2015.

Liiva soon formed the band Hearse, with Mattias Ljung on guitar and ex-Furbowl bandmate Max Thornell on drums. The band have been very active ever since, releasing Dominion Reptilian in 2003 on Hammerheart Records, Armageddon, Mon Amour in 2004 on Candlelight Records, The Last Ordeal in 2005 on Karmageddon Records, and In These Veins on Dental Records in 2006.

Liiva also was featured as guest vocalist on the Canadian Industrial Death Metal act Synastry's debut album Blind Eyes Bleed on the track 'Visions Of Anger' recorded in 2007 and to be released in 2008.

On 10 October 2015 in Japan Johan Liiva along with former Arch Enemy guitarist Christopher Amott (Michael's brother) were special guests and performed in Arch Enemy as the original band lineup. They played three songs such as "Bury Me an Angel", "The Immortal" and "Fields of Desolation". "Fields of Desolation" was performed by both original and newest lineup.

== Personal life ==
Johan Liiva is married to Alexandra Adler, who is of Ukrainian origin. The wedding ceremony was held in Ukraine on 14 October 2015.

== Discography ==
=== Max and the Chainsaws ===
- Max and the Chainsaws 7-inch EP (1989)

=== Carnage ===
- The Day Man Lost – Demo (1989)
- Infestation of Evil – Demo (1989)

=== Furbowl ===
- Those Shredded Dreams (1992)
- The Autumn Years (1994)

=== Arch Enemy ===
- Black Earth (1996)
- Stigmata (1998)
- Burning Bridges (1999)
- Burning Japan Live 1999 (2000)
- Wages of Sin (disc 2) (2001)

=== NonExist ===
- Deus Deceptor (2002)
- From My Cold Dead Hands (2012)
- Throne of Scars (2015)

=== Hearse ===
- Dominion Reptilian (2003)
- Armageddon, Mon Amour (2004)
- The Last Ordeal (2005)
- In These Veins (2006)
- Single Ticket to Paradise (2009)

=== Guest appearances ===
- Necrony — vocals on Pathological Performances (1993)
- Birdflesh — Alive Autopsy/Trip to the Grave (2001/2004)
- Manipulated Slaves — backing screams on The Legendary Black Jade (2002)
- Legen Beltza — vocals on Dimension of Pain (2006)
- Synastry — vocals on track "Visions of Anger" from album Blind Eyes Bleed (2008)
- Oceans of Sadness — on track "In the End" from album The Arrogance of Ignorance (2008)
- Betrayer – on track "In My Heart" from the album Too Loud (2013)

New title	Vocalist for Carnage; 1988	Succeeded by Matti Kärki
New title	Bassist for Carnage; 1988	Succeeded by Johnny Dordevic
New title	Vocalist for Furbowl Guitarist for Furbowl; 1991–1995	Disbanded
New title	Vocalist for Arch Enemy; 1996–2000	Succeeded by Angela Gossow
Preceded by Michael Amott	Bassist for Arch Enemy; 1996	Succeeded by Martin Bengtsson
New title	Vocalist for NonExist; 2000–2003	Disbanded
New title	Vocalist for Hearse since 2001	Incumbent
