= Max Thornell =

Swedish musician (born 1970)

- Birth name: Max Thornell
- Born: 1970
- Origin: Stockholm, Sweden
- Genres: Death metal Thrash metal Melodic death metal
- Occupation: Musician
- Instrument(s): Drums; Keyboards; Vocals
- Years active: 1990 - present
- Website: http://www.myspace.com/maxthornell

Max Thornell (born 1970) is a Swedish musician, most widely recognized as the drummer of Swedish death metal band Hearse. Also with Johan Liiva from Hearse, he played drums, keyboards and performed some backing vocals in early 90s death metal band Furbowl. The other Max's band is Swedish thrash metal band Satanarchy.

== Discography ==
=== Furbowl ===
- Those Shredded Dreams (1992)
- The Autumn Years (1994)

=== Satanarchy ===
- Disgraceful World (2002)

=== Hearse ===
- Dominion Reptilian (2003)
- Armageddon, Mon Amour (2004)
- The Last Ordeal (2005)
- In These Veins (2006)
