= Hearse (disambiguation) =

A hearse is a type of funerary vehicle.

Hearse may also refer to:

== Liturgics ==
- A type of candelabrum used during tenebrae services

== Movies ==
- The Hearse, a 1980 horror film

== Music ==
- Hearse (band), a Swedish melodic death metal band
  - "Hearse", a 2002 eponymous single by Hearse
  - "Hearse", a 2006 eponymous song by Swedish band Hearse off the album In These Veins
- "Hearse", a 1988 song from the album Martha Splatterhead's Maddest Stories Ever Told by the U.S. thrash band The Accüsed
- Hearses, a 2014 video by Smoke DZA
- "The Hearse Song", a WWI-era popular children's song about death

== See also ==
- Ambulance
- Flower car
- First call vehicle
- Commercial vehicle
- Combination car (hearse)
