= Two in one =

Two in One or 2-in-1 or variant may refer to:

- Two in One (film), a 2007 Russian film
- Marvel Two-in-One, an American comic book series
- Canon: Two in One, a musical term
- 2-in-1 laptop, a cross between a tablet computer and a laptop
- Multi-function printer, a 2-in-1 printer, the 2-function versions which combines a printer with some other device, typically a scanner
- Two-in-one (juggling)

== See also ==
- One in Two – Two in One (1979 album), album by Max Roach
- 2 of One (1989 album), a video album by Metallica
- Two to One (1978 album), album by Thelma Houston
- Two Is One (disambiguation)
