= Seventh Dimension =

Swedish progressive metal band

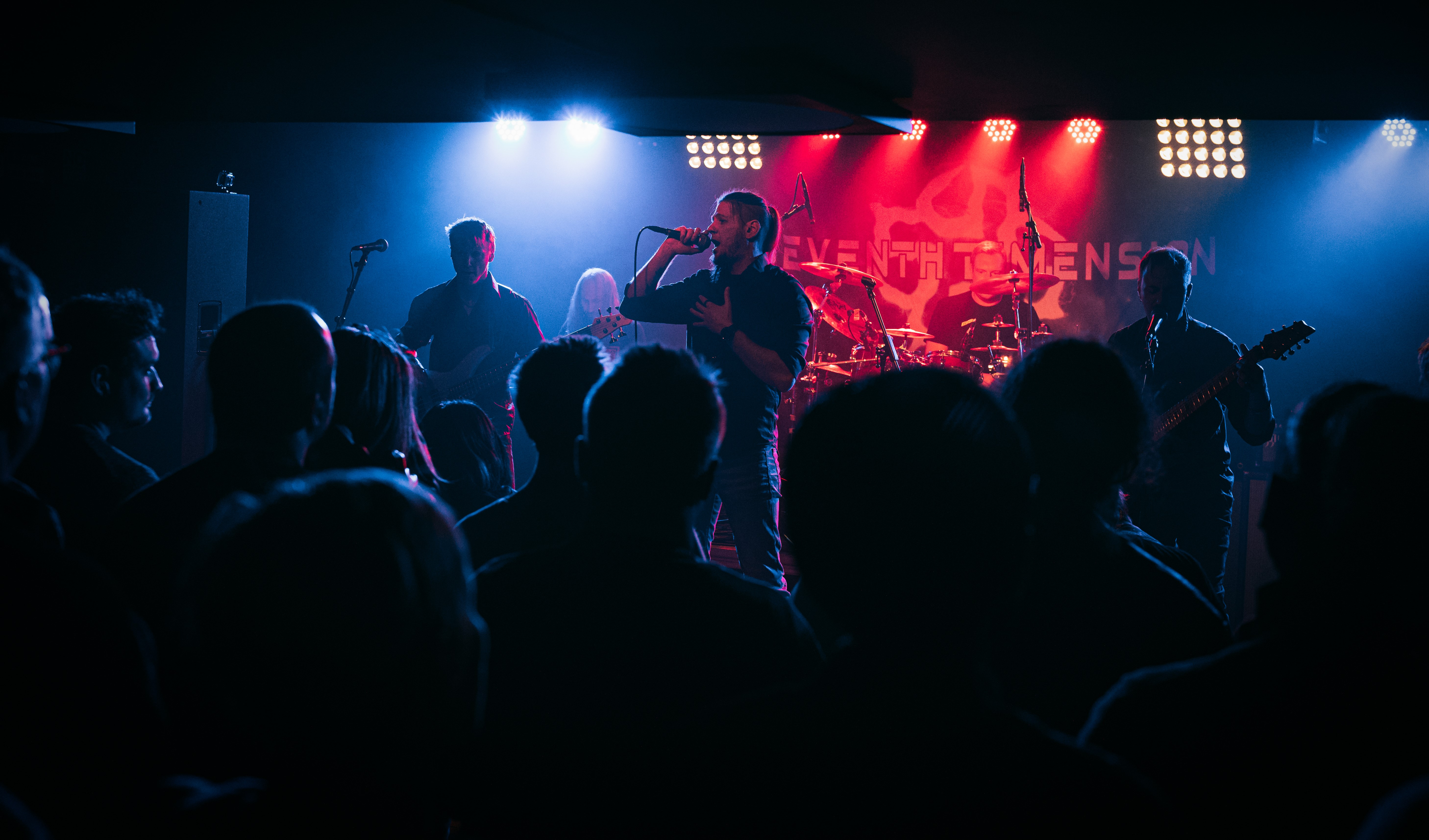
- Progressive metal band Seventh Dimension at their show at Encore, Stockholm in 2024.

Background information
- Origin: Stockholm, Sweden
- Genres: Progressive metal, progressive rock, power metal
- Years active: 2009–present
- Labels: Corrupted Records
- Members: Luca Delle Fave; Rikard Wallström; Marcus Thorén; Erik Bauer; Markus Tälth
- Website: seventh-dimension.net

Seventh Dimension is a Swedish progressive metal band formed in 2009.

== Biography ==
The band was formed by main songwriter and guitarist Luca Delle Fave, drummer Marcus Thorén and bassist Rikard Wallström in Stockholm in 2009. They were initially a trio experimenting by playing covers and writing music while searching for a keyboard player and a lead vocalist. In 2010, keyboard player Erik Bauer and singer Nico Lauritsen joined the band to complete the line up. In 2023 the band parted ways with singer Nico Lauritsen who was replaced by new singer Markus Tälth.

=== Demos and Circle of Life (2011–2013) ===
In 2011, the band started recording demos for their debut album while debuting on the live scene as the opening band for Forgotten Suns. Then in the summer of 2012, they went on to record their first album Circle of Life that was released on January 15, 2013. The debut album featured sounds that were clearly inspired by the progressive rock/metal scene with influences such as Dream Theater, Symphony X and Andromeda.

=== Recognition (2014–2015) ===
The band released their second album Recognition on February 13, 2015. This time around, the band brought a slightly heavier sound compared to the debut album Circle of Life. The album dealt with topics and subjects that people and society may neglect, dealing with introspection and self-awareness.

=== Walk With Me and The Corrupted Lullaby (2017–2018) ===
In 2017, the band started working on a dream concept album that the band had been thinking about for a long time. Along the way, they also recorded a stand-alone single called "Walk With Me" that was released on May 22, 2018. The third album The Corrupted Lullaby was recorded during 2017–2018 and the band hired several guest performers such as guest vocalists and voice actors to tell the story. The Corrupted Lullaby was released on November 1, 2018, and was the bands most ambitious project until that point.

The album was critically acclaimed receiving many good reviews as well as coverage in several magazines such as Orkus Magazine, Sweden Rock Magazine, Fireworks Magazine, Scream Magazine and PowerPlay Magazine.

=== A Change of Seasons and Black Sky (2020–2021) ===
On March 3, 2020, the band released a cover of the 23-minute prog metal classic A Change of Seasons by Dream Theater. Then in December 2020, Seventh Dimension announced on social media that they had a fourth album coming up called Black Sky and that it was set for a release in 2021. On May 7, 2021, the band announced that Black Sky will be released on June 18. A music video for the first single "Resurgence" was released on YouTube along with the announcement. Two lyric videos for "Falling" and "Black Sky: Into the Void" would then follow leading up to the release.

=== New singer and Of Hope & Ordeals (2023–2024) ===
In May 2023, the band announced through social media that they had parted ways with lead vocalist Nico Lauritsen after 13 years together. In the same post, the band also announced new member Markus Tälth as the new lead singer in the band. Less than a year later, in April 2024, the band announced through a press release that a new album called Of Hope & Ordeals would come out in June. The first single "The Great Unknown" was released on May 30 and a second single for the song "Mind Flayer" was released shortly after on June 5th. Both songs were released as digital singles on streaming services as well as in the form of music videos on YouTube. The band's fifth full length album Of Hope & Ordeals was released on June 21.

== Personnel ==
=== Members ===
==== Current members ====
- Luca Delle Fave – guitars, backing vocals (2009–present)
- Rikard Wallström – bass (2009–present)
- Marcus Thorén – drums, percussion (2009–present)
- Erik Bauer – keyboards, synthesizers (2010–present)
- Markus Tälth – lead vocals (2023–present)

==== Former members ====
- Nico Lauritsen – lead vocals (2010–2023)

== Discography ==
=== Studio albums ===
List of studio albums
Year	Album details
2013	Circle of Life: Released: January 2013
2015	Recognition: Released: February 2015
2018	The Corrupted Lullaby: Released: November 2018
2021	Black Sky: Release: June 2021
2024	Of Hope & Ordeals: Release: June 2024

=== Singles ===
- Walk With Me (2018)
- A Change of Seasons (2020)
- The Great Unknown (2024)
- Mind Flayer (2024)
