= Retromorphosis =

Technical death metal band

- Origin: Kalmar, Sweden
- Genres: Technical death metal
- Labels: Seasons of Mist
- Members: Dennis Röndum; Jonas Bryssling; Christian Muenzner; Erlend Caspersen; KC Howard

Retromorphosis is a technical death metal band, which was formed from mostly past members of Spawn of Possession. They released their first album, Psalmus Mortis, in February 2025.

== Critical reception ==
Due to the acclaim of the precursor band Spawn of Possession, Retromorphosis's first album Psalmus Mortis was highly anticipated by fans. No Clean Singing gives a very positive review highlighting the work of the individual band members on their instrument, but also especially the composition

But here's the thing ... ultimately it's not the technicality of the music (which, while undoubtedly impressive, is perhaps a little more restrained than “classic” SoP) that makes Psalmus Mortis so appealing, it's the strength of Bryssling's songwriting, which retains that same sense of unrelenting, irresistible forward motion – the title-track in particular is a prime example of how every riff, every groove, every burst of blasting fury, organically builds on what went before – that made Cabinet, Noctambulant, and Incurso so impossible to put down.

AngryMetalGuy.com rated the album as 4.0/5.0 ("Great"), also noting especially the musicianship of the individual band members. Blabbermouth.net rated the album 9/10.
