= NonExist =

Swedish heavy metal band

Nonexist
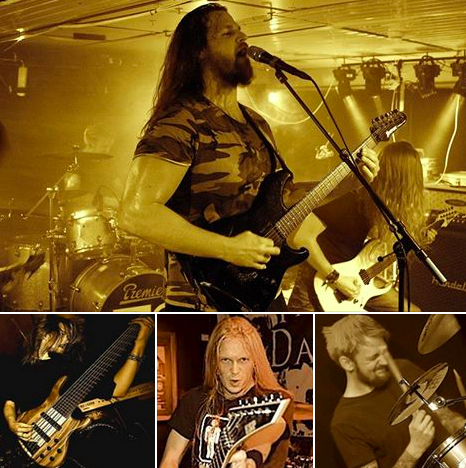
- Nonexist in 2015

Background information
- Origin: Scania, Sweden
- Genres: Melodic death metal Thrash metal
- Years active: 2000–2004; 2011–present
- Labels: New Hawen Records, Century Media, Toy's Factory, Pivotal Rockordings, Mighty Music
- Members: Johan Reinholdz; Johan Aldgård; Linus Abrahamson; Joakim Strandberg Nilsson
- Past members: Matte Modin; Johan Liiva

Nonexist is a Swedish melodic death/thrash metal group formed by former Arch Enemy vocalist Johan Liiva. Liiva, guitarist/bassist (on record) Johan Reinholdz (of Andromeda, Skyfire) and drummer Matte Modin (of Defleshed, Dark Funeral). They began playing as Nonexist in 2000. In May 2002, they released their debut album, Deus Deceptor, on New Hawen Records in Europe and Century Media in North America. The group attempted to assemble a touring lineup in 2002, but this never occurred, in part due to the group members' commitments to other projects. In 2003, Liiva and Modin split from the group, leaving Reinholdz as the only member. In 2004, Liiva (now with Hearse) confirmed the group's demise.

In 2011, Nonexist reformed as Reinholdz started writing the second album, From My Cold Dead Hands. It was recorded in 2011/2012 with Liiva on vocals, and released by Pivotal Rockordings in November 2012 and by Japanese label Trooper Entertainment in May 2013. This album was Reinholdz's producing debut. He singlehandedly mixed, produced, and mastered. The band live-debuted at the Scorched Tundra Festival in Gothenburg, December 2012. In 2014, Nonexist started recording their third album, the nine-track Throne of Scars. Reinholdz produced and mixed it at Multipass Studios with assistance from Markus Nilsson at Sunnanå Studio in Malmö. The songs retained the dark, intense, varied, heavy atmosphere from the previous album, while adding new influences . Throne of Scars was mixed and finished in April 2015, and during the same time, the band signed with Danish label Mighty Music. The album was released in Japan by Trooper Entertainment, in August and in the rest of the world by Mighty Music on October 10, 2015.

In November 2015, Liiva quit the band and Reinholdz took over as frontman, playing guitar and singing in the studio and live. The band is active with Faithful Darkness members Johan Aldgård and Joakim Strandberg Nilsson, as well as Andromeda bass player Linus Abrahamson. Nonexist released the EP The New Flesh, which featured songs from Throne of Scars and from previous albums with Reinholdz' vocals.

== Members ==
=== Current members ===
- Johan Reinholdz - lead guitar, vocals, bass, keyboards, drum programming (2000–2004, 2011–present)
- Johan Aldgård - rhythm guitar (2015–present)
- Linus Abrahamson - bass (2015–present)
- Joakim Strandberg Nilsson - drums (2015–present)

=== Former members ===
- Johan Liiva – lead vocals (2000–2003, 2011–2015)
- Matte Modin – drums (2000–2003)

== Discography ==
- Deus Deceptor (2002, Century Media/Toy's Factory)
- From My Cold Dead Hands (2012, Pivotal/Tropper Entertainment )
- Throne of Scars (2015, Mighty Music/Trooper Entertainment )
- The New Flesh EP (2016, Mighty Music)
- Like the Fearless Hunter (2020, Mighty Music)
