= Caged =

Caged may refer to:

== Film and TV ==
- Caged (1950 film), an American film noir directed by John Cromwell
- Caged (2010 film), a French horror film directed by Yann Gozlan
- Caged (2011 film), a Dutch feature film directed by Stephan Brenninkmeijer
- Caged (2020 film), a horror film directed by Aaron Fjellman
- Caged (TV series), an MTV reality show about mixed martial artists in tiny Minden, Louisiana
- "Caged" (CSI), the 7th episode of the second season of CSI: Crime Scene Investigation

== Music ==
- "Caged", a song by Charlene Soraia from Love Is the Law
- "Caged", a song by Skyfire from Mind Revolution
- "Caged", a song by Within Temptation from Mother Earth
- CAGED, a system for learning and playing guitar chords

== See also ==
- Imprisonment, the restraint of a person's liberty
