= Spectral (Skyfire album) =

Studio album by Skyfire
- Released: 10 May 2004
- Genres: Power metal, melodic death metal, neo-classical metal, symphonic metal
- Length: 43:21
- Label: Arise
- Producer: Skyfire

Skyfire chronology
Mind Revolution (2003)	Spectral (2004)	Esoteric (2009)

Professional ratings
Review scores
Source	Rating
Metal.de	8/10
Metal Storm	8.5/10
Sputnikmusic	4/5

Spectral is the third full-length studio album by Swedish metal band Skyfire. It was released on 10 May 2004 through Arise Records. The lyrical themes include armageddon, loneliness, delusion, despair and mysticism. The Korean release of the album features three bonus songs; "Patterns" and two live tracks "Skyfire (2003 Busan Rock Festival Live)" and "Mind Revolution (2003 Busan Rock Festival Live)".

== Track listing ==
1. "Conjuring the Thoughts" – 6:27
2. "Effusion of Strength" – 3:02
3. "Shivering Shade" – 4:24
4. "Cursed by Belief" – 4:05
5. "Awake" – 4:05
6. "Void of Hope" – 5:50
7. "A Dead Man's Race" – 6:01
8. "Shadow Creator" – 4:30
9. "Tranquillity's Maze" – 4:57

Korean Bonus Tracks

1. "Patterns" – 4:24
2. "Skyfire (2003 Busan Rock Festival Live, Korea)"
3. "Mind Revolution (2003 Busan Rock Festival Live, Korea)"

== Personnel ==
=== Band members ===
- Martin Hanner – guitar, keyboards
- Andreas Edlund – guitar, keyboards
- Jonas Sjögren – bass guitar
- Henrik Wenngren – vocals
- Joakim Jonsson – drums

=== Production ===
- Bass guitar recorded by Andreas, Martin and Joakim
