= The Immunity Zone =

Studio album by Andromeda
- Released: 16 September 2008
- Recorded: 2007–2008
- Genre: Progressive metal
- Length: 66:25
- Label: Nightmare Records

Andromeda chronology
| Chimera (2006) | The Immunity Zone (2008) | Manifest Tyranny (2011) |

The Immunity Zone is the fourth full-length album by progressive metal band Andromeda. The album has received positive reviews, including 8.5/10 by Powermetal.de, but only 4/10 by Metal.de. The song "Shadow of a Lucent Moon" was featured in Nightmare Records' 2010 Merry Metal Christmas compilation.

== Track listing ==
1. "Recognizing Fate" - 7:19
2. "Slaves of the Plethora Season" - 5:34
3. "Ghosts on Retinas" - 4:28
4. "Censoring Truth" - 6:38
5. "Worst Enemy" - 6:01
6. "My Star" - 5:40
7. "Another Step" - 5:58
8. "Shadow of a Lucent Moon" - 7:22
9. "Veil of Illumination" - 17:25

== Personnel ==
- David Fremberg - vocals
- Johan Reinholdz - guitars
- Thomas Lejon - drums
- Martin Hedin - keyboards
- Fabian Gustavsson - bass
