= Two Is One =

Two Is One may refer to:

- Two Is One (Charlie Rouse album), 1974
- Two Is One (Andromeda album), 2003
