= Cabinet (album) =

Studio album by Spawn of Possession
- Released: 14 January 2003
- Recorded: June–August 2002
- Studio: Pama Studio 1 and 3
- Genre: Technical death metal
- Length: 38:12
- Label: Unique Leader
- Producer: Magnus Sedenberg

Spawn of Possession chronology
Church of Deviance (2001)	Cabinet (2003)	Noctambulant (2006)

Cabinet is the debut studio album by Swedish death metal band Spawn of Possession.

== Track listing ==
All lyrics are written by Dennis Röndum, except "Hidden in Flesh" and "Uncle Damfee" by Röndum & Niklas Dewerud; all music is composed by Jonas Bryssling, except where noted.

No.	Title	Music	Length
1.	"Lamashtu" (instrumental)		0:49
2.	"Swarm of the Formless"	Bryssling; Röndum; Jonas Karlsson	3:08
3.	"Hidden in Flesh"		4:25
4.	"A Presence Inexplicable"	Bryssling; Röndum; Karlsson	3:56
5.	"Dirty Priest"		3:16
6.	"Spawn of Possession"		3:57
7.	"Inner Conflict"		2:58
8.	"Cabinet"		3:28
9.	"The Forbidden"	Bryssling; Karlsson	4:35
10.	"Church of Deviance"		3:30
11.	"Uncle Damfee"		4:10
Total length:			38:12

Professional ratings
Review scores
Source	Rating
Sputnikmusic	4.5/5 stars
Ultimate Guitar	8.7/10

== Credits ==
- Jonas Bryssling – guitar
- Jonas Karlsson – guitar
- Niklas Dewerud – bass
- Dennis Röndum – drums, vocals
