= Spirituality and Distortion =

Studio album by Igorrr
- Released: 27 March 2020
- Studio: Improve Tone Studios, Mana Recording Studios, Dime Studios
- Genre: Breakcore; avant-garde metal; extreme metal
- Length: 55:30
- Label: Metal Blade
- Producer: Gautier Serre

Igorrr chronology
Savage Sinusoid (2017)	Spirituality and Distortion (2020)	Amen (2025)

Singles from Spirituality and Distortion
- 1. "Very Noise" Released: 14 January 2020; 2. "Parpaing" Released: 25 February 2020; 3. "Camel Dancefloor" Released: 17 March 2020

Professional ratings
Review scores
Source	Rating
Blabbermouth	8/10
Metal Injection	9,5/10
Loud TV	5/5 stars

Spirituality and Distortion is the fourth album by Gautier Serre, under his alias Igorrr, released on Metal Blade Records on 27 March 2020. In 2024, it was named one of the 10 "wackiest" progressive metal albums ever by Loudwire.

== Track listing ==
All tracks are written by Gautier Serre.

Spirituality and Distortion track listing
No.	Title	Length
1.	"Downgrade Desert"	4:23
2.	"Nervous Waltz"	3:23
3.	"Very Noise"	1:47
4.	"Hollow Tree"	3:06
5.	"Camel Dancefloor"	3:13
6.	"Parpaing" (featuring George Fisher)	3:36
7.	"Musette Maximum"	2:18
8.	"Himalaya Massive Ritual"	7:06
9.	"Lost in Introspection"	4:56
10.	"Overweight Poesy"	5:50
11.	"Paranoid Bulldozer Italiano"	3:47
12.	"Barocco Satani"	3:36
13.	"Polyphonic Rust"	4:16
14.	"Kung-Fu Chèvre"	4:13
Total length:		55:30

== Personnel ==
=== Igorrr ===
- Gautier Serre – electric guitar, keyboards, programming, composition, recording, mixing, mastering, production

=== Additional musicians ===
- Laurent Lunoir – vocals
- Laure Le Prunenec – vocals
- Sylvain Bouvier – drums, percussion
- Benjamin Baŕdiaux – harpsichord
- Erlend Caspersen – bass
- Mike Leon – bass (11)
- George Fisher – vocals (6)
- Diego Delgadillo – lyrics (6)
- Fotini-Asineth Kokkala – qanun
- Alexandre Peronny – cello
- Mehdi Haddab – oud
- Pierre Mussi – accordion
- Antony Miranda – sitar, percussion
- Nils Cheville – classical guitar
- Martyn Clément – electric guitar
- Matt Lebofsky – piano
- Benjamin Violet – strings
- Timba Harris – strings

=== Technical personnel ===
- Arthur Paiz, Erik Rutan, Hervé Faivre – recording
- Førtifem – artwork
- Jon Herrera – piano recording

== Charts ==
Sales chart performance for Spirituality and Distortion
Chart (2020)	Peak position
German Albums (Offizielle Top 100)	12
Swiss Albums (Schweizer Hitparade)	57
