= Moment (Dark Tranquillity album) =

Studio album by Dark Tranquillity
- Released: 20 November 2020
- Recorded: March – July 2020
- Studio: Rogue Music; Nacksving Studios (drums)
- Genre: Melodic death metal
- Length: 49:59
- Label: Century Media
- Producer: Martin Brändström

Dark Tranquillity chronology
Atoma (2016)	Moment (2020)	Endtime Signals (2024)

Singles from Moment
- 1. "Phantom Days" Released: 11 September 2020; 2. "Identical to None" Released: 16 October 2020; 3. "The Dark Unbroken" Released: 30 October 2020

Moment is the twelfth studio album by Swedish melodic death metal band Dark Tranquillity, being released on 20 November 2020 via Century Media Records. The album is the band's first to include guitarist Johan Reinholdz, the final with founding drummer Anders Jivarp and bassist Anders Iwers, who left the band in August 2021, and the only with guitarist Christopher Amott before his departure in July 2023. It is also the first release since We Are The Void (2010) to be recorded as a six-piece.

== Reception ==
Moment received generally positive reviews from both fans and critics. Most feedback was very positive, while also stating that the album was not anything outstanding or out of the ordinary for the band.

In a review from Sonic Perspective, Jonathan Smith said, "In the grand scheme of Dark Tranquillity’s near 30 year career, this stands as one of the more polished yet also one of the more safe ventures to come out of their arsenal. It doesn’t quite deliver the same level of lasting impact as Fiction, but it proves to be a slight step above most of what came between said album and the present." Jason Roche of Blabbermouth said, "If you are a longtime DARK TRANQUILLITY fan, there is nothing on "Moment" that will particularly shock you. The new additions to the band slide into the picture in almost a plug-and-play manner, but here, that's a good thing as the final result is simply another strong record in an already impressively deep catalog." Tom Morgan of Distorted Sound said, "The masters have done it again, and their heart and soul proves an invigorating tonic to these days of anger and hatred."

Professional ratings
Review scores
Source	Rating
Sonic Perspectives	8.3/10
Blabbermouth	8/10
Distorted Sound	8/10

== Track listing ==
All lyrics are written by Mikael Stanne.

Standard edition
No.	Title	Music	Length
1.	"Phantom Days"	Anders Jivarp; Johan Reinholdz	3:59
2.	"Transient"	Reinholdz	4:11
3.	"Identical to None"	Jivarp; Reinholdz	3:41
4.	"The Dark Unbroken"	Reinholdz	4:54
5.	"Remain in the Unknown"	Martin Brändström	4:40
6.	"Standstill"	Jivarp; Reinholdz	4:11
7.	"Ego Deception"	Reinholdz	4:21
8.	"A Drawn Out Exit"	Brändström; Reinholdz	4:01
9.	"Eyes of the World"	Brändström; Reinholdz	3:50
10.	"Failstate"	Jivarp	3:20
11.	"Empires Lost to Time"	Jivarp	4:10
12.	"In Truth Divided"	Jivarp	4:41
Total length:			49:59

2CD limited edition bonus CD
No.	Title	Music	Length
1.	"Silence as a Force"	Jivarp	3:26
2.	"Time in Relativity"	Jivarp	3:53

Japan bonus tracks
No.	Title	Music	Length
13.	"Silence as a Force"	Jivarp	3:26
14.	"Time in Relativity"	Jivarp	3:53
15.	"There Is Nothing"		4:08

== Personnel ==
=== Dark Tranquillity ===
- Mikael Stanne – vocals
- Christopher Amott – guitars
- Johan Reinholdz - guitars
- Anders Iwers – bass
- Martin Brändström – electronics
- Anders Jivarp – drums

=== Additional personnel ===
- Jens Bogren – mixing, mastering
- Niklas Sundin - artwork

== Charts ==
Chart performance for Moment
Chart (2020)	Peak position
Austrian Albums (Ö3 Austria)	24
Belgian Albums (Ultratop Flanders)	196
Belgian Albums (Ultratop Wallonia)	50
Finnish Albums (Suomen virallinen lista)	9
French Albums (SNEP)	181
German Albums (Offizielle Top 100)	17
Italian Albums (FIMI)	96
Spanish Albums (Promusicae)	71
Swedish Albums (Sverigetopplistan)	14
Swiss Albums (Schweizer Hitparade)	16
