= Blood Red Throne =

Norwegian death metal band

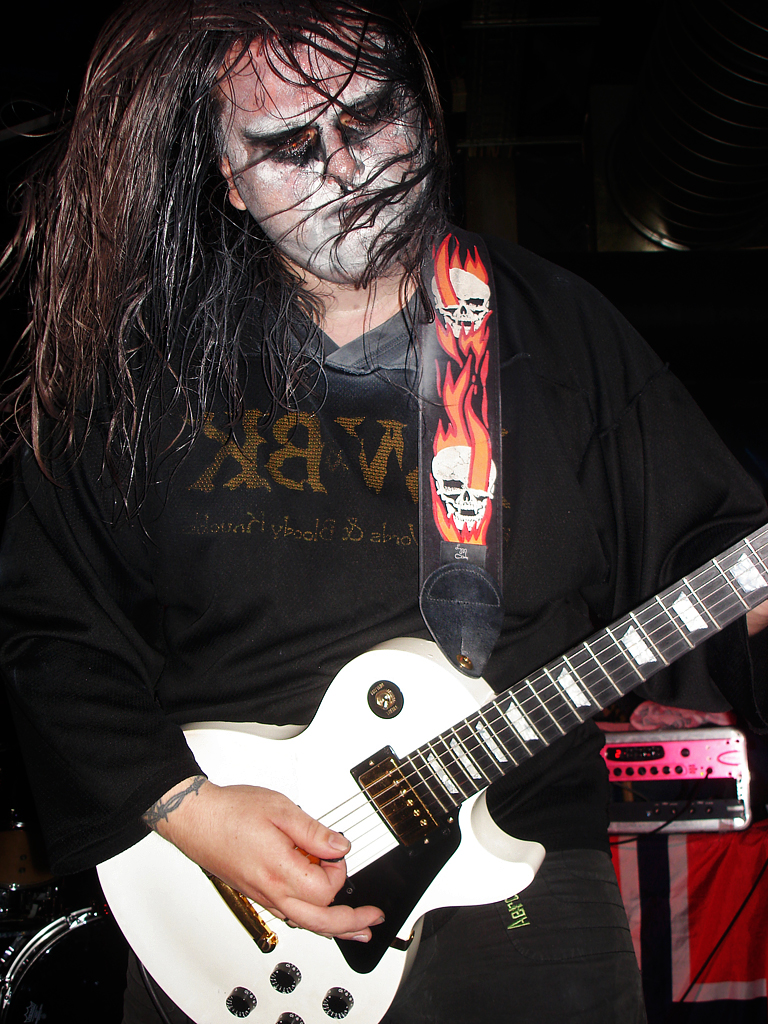
- Former guitarist Tchort

Background information
- Origin: Kristiansand, Norway
- Genres: Death metal
- Years active: 1998–present
- Label: Mighty Music
- Members: Yngve "Bolt" Christiansen; Ivan "MeathooK" Gujic; Daniel "Død" Olaisen; Stian Gundersen; Freddy Bolsø
- Past members: Osvald "Vald" Egeland; Terje "Tchort" Vik Schei; Anders Haave; Flemming "Mr. Hustler" Gluch; Espen Antonsen; Bernt Moen; Erlend Caspersen; Emil Wiksten

Blood Red Throne is a Norwegian death metal band. They were formed in Kristiansand, Norway, in 1998 by former Satyricon live guitarist Daniel "Død" Olaisen.

They are regarded as the most pure death metal band in Norway alongside Cadaver, with a distinct influence from Florida death metal. They are known for their energetic live performances.

Blood Red Throne have released twelve studio albums as of December 2025. They have toured large parts of the world multiple times as headliners and supporting bands such as Dimmu Borgir, Enslaved, Suffocation, and Cryptopsy. They have performed at festivals, including Wacken Open Air, Hellfest, Bloodstock, 70000 Tons of Metal, and Norway’s Hole in the Sky.

Founder Olaisen is the only permanent member and has been the band’s leader throughout its career. He writes most of the music while the vocalists write the lyrics.

== History ==
Olaisen wanted to start a death metal band since 1993, but he only found a capable drummer until 1998, when he met Freddy "Fred the Shred" Bolsø and they began jamming. At the time, Olaisen and Terje "Tchort" Vik Schei (Emperor, In the Woods…, Green Carnation) were touring as live musicians with Satyricon, and Vik Schei was invited to join what would become Blood Red Throne. Soon after, bassist Erlend Caspersen joined the group. The band recorded a demo, Deathmix 2000, with Ronny Thorsen from Trail of Tears on vocals. This demo received positive feedback and Blood Red Throne got offers from multiple labels.

With singer Flemming "Mr. Hustler" Gluch, the band recorded the debut Monument of Death and released it through Hammerheart Records in 2001. The limited edition included a package called "The Suicide Kit", which contained a printed razor blade and a poster with the album. The kits were hand-numbered in the band members' blood. Blood Red Throne did not play live shows with this line up. Freddy Bolsø moved back to his hometown and the band had to find a new drummer.

Espen "Beist" Antonsen of The Sickening joined and the band recorded Affiliated With The Suffering in 2002, their last album through Hammerheart Records. The band did two European tours and the Inferno Fest with this lineup. Beist left as they were about to record their first album for Earache Records. With help from Bernt Moen, Blood Red Throne recorded their third album, Altered Genesis. That album was released in 2005, and afterward Gluch left the band due to work commitments. Vald replaced him. Blood Red Throne recruited drummer Anders Haave in 2006. Blood Red Throne went on a new European tour before going into the studio to record their fourth album, Come Death, for Earache Records.

Blood Red Throne released their fifth album, Souls of Damnation, on June 1, 2009, through Earache Records. The digipak version of the CD included a DVD to celebrate the band's 10-year career. Blood Red Throne was confirmed on February 7, 2009, to play at the Infernofestival in Oslo, which took place April 8–11, 2009. It was set to take place on the stage called BLÅ, where they played with bands like Terrordrome.

On April 23, 2010, Blood Red Throne announced on MySpace that guitarist Tchort was leaving due to "work and family commitments" and was being replaced with Ivan "MeathooK" Gujic of Neongod for the remainder of their tours and shows that year. A while later, it was announced in another post that 19-year-old Emil Wiksten would take over on drums. The band toured with Dimmu Borgir, Enslaved and Dawn of Ashes in November–December 2010. They toured with Grave, Pathology and Gigan in August to September 2011. In December 2011, Yngve "Bolt" Christiansen replaced Osvald “Vald“ Egeland as vocalist, and would remain with the band until 2023.

== Members ==
=== Current members ===
- Sindre Wathne Johnsen – vocals (2023–present), bass (2023–2024, during Gunner's cancer treatment)
- Daniel "Død" Olaisen – guitar (1998–present)
- Ivan "Meathook" Gujic – guitar (2010–present)
- Stian "Gunner" Gundersen – bass (2018–present)
- Freddy Bolsø – drums (1998–2002, 2013–present)
- Kristoffer Lunden – drums (alternating with Bolsø live, 2018–)

=== Former members ===
- Terje "Tchort" Vik Schei – guitar (1998–2010)
- Flemming "Mr Hustler" Gluch – vocals (2001–2005)
- Osvald "Vald" Egeland – vocals (2005–2011)
- Yngve "Bolt" Christiansen – vocals (2011–2023)
- Erlend Caspersen – bass (1998–2011)
- Ole Bent Madsen – bass (2011–2018)
- Espen Antonsen – drums (2002–2005)
- Anders Kobro – drums (2005–2007)
- Anders Haave – drums (2007–2010)
- Emil Wiksten – drums (2010–2013)
- Martin Skar Berger – vocals (2015)

=== Associated members ===
- Ronny Thorsen – vocals on demo (2000)

== Discography ==
=== Studio albums ===
- Monument of Death (2001)
- Affiliated with the Suffering (2003)
- Altered Genesis (2005)
- Come Death (2007)
- Souls of Damnation (2009)
- Brutalitarian Regime (2011)
- Blood Red Throne (2013)
- Union of Flesh and Machine (2016)
- Fit to Kill (2019)
- Imperial Congregation (2021)
- Nonagon (2024)
- Siltskin (2025)

=== Other releases ===
- A Taste for Blood (EP) (2002)
- A Taste for Butchery (Split album with Severe Torture) (2003)
- Gore Encore (2018)
