= Erlend Caspersen =

Norwegian bassist

- Born: 1982 (age 43–44)
- Genres: Technical death metal
- Occupations: Musician, bassist
- Instrument: Bass guitar
- Years active: 1997-present

Erlend Caspersen (born 1982) is a Norwegian bassist who currently plays in Abhorrent, Retromorphosis and Igorrr. He also played for Deeds of Flesh, Spawn of Possession and Blood Red Throne. He is notable for his aggressive bass tone and highly technical playing, with a very varied range of techniques, including two-handed tapping, sweeping, and slapping.

== Biography ==
Caspersen started playing bass when he was twelve; for his 12th birthday he bought his first bass (instead of a bicycle that he had originally intended) because a lot of his friends were in bands. He cited Victor Wooten, Les Claypool and Alex Webster as his biggest influences. Alex Webster cited him as the best death metal bass player of his generation. Caspersen is best known for his work with bands Spawn of Possession and Blood Red Throne. He also did a number of session jobs for bands like Vile, Decrepit Birth, and Incinerate.

He also has a YouTube channel where he covers some Spawn of Possession songs like 'Dead and Grotesque' as well as songs from the album on which he played bass for the band, Spawn of Possession.

== Equipment ==
Caspersen is endorsed by Warwick bass guitars. His main bass guitar is the 5-string Warwick Corvette $$ Ash-5, 34" scale neck-through bubinga model, which he runs through Sansamp bass driver DI int

- 6-string fretless Warwick Thumb NT
- 5-string Warwick $$ Corvette NT
- 6-string Warwick Thumb NT

In 2020, Caspersen revealed on his Instagram account that he had purchased a Strandberg headless bass and, in 2021, a 37" scale, fanned fret Dingwall bass. Both are 5-string.

== Discography (major) ==
Igorrr

- Savage Sinusoid (2017)
- Spirituality and Distortion (2020)
- Amen (2025)

Spawn of Possession

- Incurso (2012)

Blood Red Throne

- Monument of Death (2001)
- Affiliated with the Suffering (2003)
- Altered Genesis (2005)
- Come Death (2007)
- Souls of Damnation (2009)

Other

- Dismal Euphony - Python Zero (2001)
- Emeth - Telesis (2008)
- Deeds of Flesh - Of What's to Come (2008)
- The Allseeing I - Holodemiurgia (2008)
- Incinerate - Anatomize (2008)
