= Esoteric (album) =

Studio album by Skyfire
- Released: 14 September 2009
- Genres: Melodic death metal, neo-classical metal, progressive metal, black metal, power metal
- Length: 55:58
- Label: Pivotal Rockordings
- Producer: Skyfire

Skyfire chronology
Spectral (2004)	Esoteric (2009)

Professional ratings
Review scores
Source	Rating
Blabbermouth	8.5/10 stars
Chronicles of Chaos	7.5/10 stars
Rock Hard	6/10 stars

Esoteric is the fourth studio album by Swedish metal band Skyfire. It was released on 14 September in the United Kingdom, 18 September for the rest of Europe and October 13, 2009 in North America, through Pivotal Rockordings. The cover artwork was made by Pär Olofsson who also created the artwork for other acts such as The Faceless, Psycroptic and Spawn of Possession along with the layout by Erik Olofsson of Cult of Luna. Martin Hanner revealed that the album is a concept album and that "The cover is basically a guy who is being initiated by a cult," he further responded with:

"You can choose to interpret the guy in pain as he is being burned alive by the cultists just so he can join, or you can interpret the guy as having achieved the power he sought, and he is screaming out of bliss and not pain. It relates to the title because a lot of us would think that what he is doing is kind of ridiculous — why would anyone want to join a cult? But people do strange things and they have their own subjective, esoteric sense of understanding that to the rest of us, is strange or crazy. I think we ALL in some shape or form have esoteric practices that a lot of other people don't 'get,' whether it's believing in something or even listening to metal music."

The band was also going for an epic sound inspired by the likes of Symphony X and Bal-Sagoth. A choir and orchestra was said to be added to their overall sound but it is unclear as to what extent they would be used. As for bonus tracks, the band and label decided on releasing material previously unheard by the public from their demo Within Reach. At this time, the band used clean vocals as opposed to growling vocals.

== Track listing ==
No.	Title	Length
1.	"Deathlike Overture (Intro)"	1:26
2.	"Esoteric"	4:45
3.	"Rise and Decay"	6:11
4.	"Let the Old World Burn"	4:11
5.	"Darkness Descending"	7:09
6.	"Seclusion"	3:57
7.	"Misery's Supremacy"	7:10
8.	"Under a Pitch Black Sky"	4:52
9.	"Linger in Doubt"	5:19
10.	"The Legacy of the Defeated"	7:22

Bonus track

11. Within Reach – 4:14

== Personnel ==
Band members

- Joakim Karlsson – vocals
- Martin Hanner – bass guitar, keyboards
- Andreas Edlund – guitar, keyboards
- Johan Reinholdz – guitar
- Joakim Jonsson – drums

Artwork

- Cover artwork by Pär Olofsson
- Layout by Erik Olofsson (Cult of Luna)

== Release history ==
Region	Date
United Kingdom	14 September 2009
Europe	18 September 2009
North America	October 13, 2009
