= Igorrr =

French musician

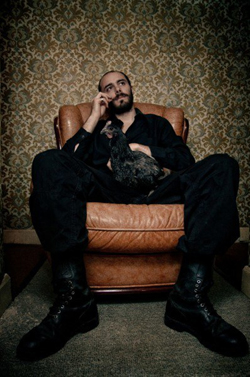
- Serre in November 2010

Background information
- Born: Gautier Serre; 5 June 1984 (age 42); France
- Genres: Experimental; breakcore; extreme metal; industrial; classical
- Years active: 2005–present
- Labels: Ad Noiseam, Metal Blade, Blood Music
- Members: Gautier Serre; Rémi Serafino; JB Le Bail; Martyn Clément; Erlend Caspersen; Gerda Iguchi
- Past members: Laurent Lunoir; Laure Le Prunenec; Aphrodite Patoulidou; Patrick; Sylvain Bouvier; Marthe Alexandre
- Website: igorrr.com

Gautier Serre (born 5 June 1984), better known by his stage name Igorrr, is a French musician, composer and producer. Under the Igorrr alias, he combines a variety of disparate genres, including black metal, baroque music, breakcore, and trip hop, into a singular sound. Serre is also part of the now disbanded side-projects Whourkr and Corpo-Mente. The Igorrr project has evolved into a full-fledged group with vocalists Laure Le Prunenec and Laurent Lunoir, drummer Sylvain Bouvier, guitarist Martyn Clément and bassist Erlend Caspersen. In 2021, both vocalists left the band and were replaced by JB Le Bail and Aphrodite Patoulidou; the latter was later replaced by Marthe Alexandre. In 2024, Rémi Serafino became drummer. Gerda Iguchi succeeded Alexandre as vocalist in 2026.

== History ==
=== Solo work (2004–2016) ===
Gautier Serre is a French composer, multi-instrumentalist and electronic producer. As a child, he would imitate Jean-Michel Jarre when he gave piano concerts. He is from Alsace, although he has stated that he "comes from 'Rennes, Paris, Clermont-Ferrand and Saint-Paul-en-Forêt'". He has been active since 2004. Serre plays piano, drums, and guitar and primarily uses Steinberg Cubase for recording.

In 2005, Serre started the Igorrr project. He named his project after a pet gerbil called Igorr that he had as a child, adding the extra "r" to "make it harder to pronounce." Serre has synesthesia; in his case, he perceives sounds as colours, noting that he composes "a bit visually, certain blends working better than others".

Igorrr self-released two demo albums, Poisson Soluble (2006) and Moisissure (2008, Acroplane Recordings), which gained the attention of label Ad Noiseam. His debut album, Nostril, was released in 2010, alongside a companion EP, Baroquecore. In 2011, his demos were reissued by Ad Noiseam.

Igorrr's second album, Hallelujah, was released in 2012. It featured collaboration from Mayhem guitarist Teloch and baroque soprano vocalist Laure Le Prunenec. Igorrr's pet chicken, Patrick, gained notoriety for "playing" the piano (Serre would put chicken feed on corresponding keys the chicken would peck at.) Serre won a GoPro award for film making for a video of Patrick playing filmed with a GoPro.

=== Expansion into a full band (2017–present) ===
In February 2017, Igorrr signed with Metal Blade Records. His third album, Savage Sinusoid, was released on 16 June 2017. It was recorded over five years by a collective of musicians. The album was preceded by the single "ieuD". Unlike previous Igorrr albums, it did not feature any samples. It featured collaboration with members of Cattle Decapitation and Secret Chiefs 3. The album received positive critical reception, Metal Injection awarded it "The Bat Shit Crazy Album Of The Year Award", and a perfect 10/10 score, while AllMusic gave the album 4 out of 5 stars. Metal Hammer gave the album 4 out of 5 stars as well. The album charted in Belgium on the Ultratop Flanders chart, reaching #173.

Igorrr has also performed at several other festivals, including Heavy Montréal festival, Dour Festival (three times, in 2014, 2015 and 2017), Roadburn Festival, Europavox, Montreux Jazz Festival, Metaldays, Durbuy Rock Festival, Motocultor Festival, Download Festival, Brutal Assault, Hellfest Open Air, FortaRock, and Copenhell, among others. Igorrr also had a short film shown at the Orlando Film Festival. They also performed at a rock festival hosted by the opera company Opéra national du Rhin in 2017.

Igorrr toured North America for the first time in 2018. In June 2018, Igorrr supported Ministry on their 2018 North American tour. The live show featured drummer Sylvain Bouvier and vocalists Le Prunenec and Laurent Lunoir, alongside Serre on vocals and programming.

In 2021, Lunoir and Le Prunenec left the band. Lunoir refused COVID-19 vaccination, complicating touring, while Le Prunenec chose to focus on her personal life. New vocalists replaced them: JB Le Bail and Greek soprano Aphrodite Patoulidou.

Lyric mezzo-soprano vocalist Marthe Alexandre had been part of Igorrr since 2022. Igorrr embarked on a European headlining tour, titled the "Distortion 2023 Tour", which took place in March and April, with Amenra, Der Weg einer Freiheit, and Hangman's Chair as supporting acts. In March 2023, Alexandre announced that she was the new lyrical vocalist for Igorrr, replacing Patoulidou.

In 2024, Bouvier left his position as drummer, and Rémi Serafino replaced him. Igorrr's 2025 album Amen features vocals by Alexandre.

In April 2026, Igorrr announced that German-Japanese mezzo-soprano opera vocalist Marie Gerhardine Iguchi (Gerda Iguchi) replaced Alexandre in the group. Igorrr headlined a US and Canadian tour in the fall of 2026 with Secret Chiefs 3 and Violent Magic Orchestra as opening acts.

== Style and influences ==
Igorrr's sound combines breakbeats, heavy metal riffs, extreme tempo changes, and operatic singing coupled with screaming/growling, among other elements, to create what Eric Stephenson of AllMusic describes as "an intense, disturbing, and undeniably distinct experience". The project's musical sources include black metal, death metal, industrial metal, progressive metal, classical music (especially Baroque music), Balkan music, breakcore, and trip hop. It has provoked labels such as "Baroquecore" and has been described as Dadaist. Libération's Guillaume Tion described Igorrr as a "musical project that convokes a whole panoply of styles on a wide instrumentarium, from Baroque to death metal, from harpsichord to sitar, from aria to howl, with women, men, machines", all underpinned by powerful drumming. Bruno Lesprit of Le Monde wrote: "It is indisputably singular, radical, and definitely divisive."

In a 2017 interview, Serre said of Igorrr's origin: "It started when I was a teenager looking for a band or an artist destroying all the limits of music, a band able to bring what all the boring mainstream bands could not bring." Serre listed classical composers Frédéric Chopin, Johann Sebastian Bach, Jean-Philippe Rameau, and Domenico Scarlatti, alongside contemporary acts Taraf de Haïdouks, Cannibal Corpse, Meshuggah, Aphex Twin, Mr. Bungle (as well as other Mike Patton projects), and Portishead as influences in the early days.

== Collaborations ==
=== With other musicians ===
Serre was part of Whourkr from 2005 up until 2013, when the group went on to focus on individual projects. Igorrr released the Maigre EP, a collaboration with French artist Ruby My Dear. Starting in 2015, Serre is part of Corpo-Mente, where he works with Le Prunenec. Their first self-titled album was on the label Blood Music and recorded at Improve Tone Studio in Lezoux, France. He also collaborated with fellow breakcore artist Bong-Ra Serre worked with The Algorithm on Brute Force.

Serre has remixed songs for Morbid Angel (released on Illud Divinum Insanus – The Remixes) and Meshuggah.

=== Jeannette: The Childhood of Joan of Arc ===
Igorrr composed half of the soundtrack to the musical film Jeannette: The Childhood of Joan of Arc directed by Bruno Dumont. The film was screened at the 2017 Cannes Film Festival. The soundtrack was nominated for Best Music at the 23rd Lumière Awards. According to Serre, his initial compositions had a "medieval atmosphere", before the director told him to "just do Igorrr". The score is described as "electro-pop with a dose of heavy metal" and techno-pop.

== Band members ==
Current members

- Gautier Serre – guitar, programming, instrumentations, vocals (2005–present)
- Erlend Caspersen – bass (2017–present)
- Martyn Clément – guitar (2019–present)
- JB Le Bail – harsh vocals (2021–present)
- Rémi Serafino – drums (2024–present; touring 2023–2024)
- Gerda Iguchi – mezzo-soprano vocals (2026–present)

Former members

- Laurent Lunoir – clean and harsh vocals (2008–2021)
- Laure Le Prunenec – soprano vocals (2010–2021)
- Aphrodite Patoulidou – soprano vocals (2021–2022)
- Patrick the chicken – chicken vocals, piano (2005–2015)
- Sylvain Bouvier – drums, percussion (2016–2024)
- Marthe Alexandre – mezzo-soprano vocals (2022–2026)

Recurring studio members

- Mike Leon – bass guitar
- Antony Miranda – sitar, guitar, percussion
- Nils Cheville – acoustic guitar
- Timba Harris – strings

Igorrr, original lineup

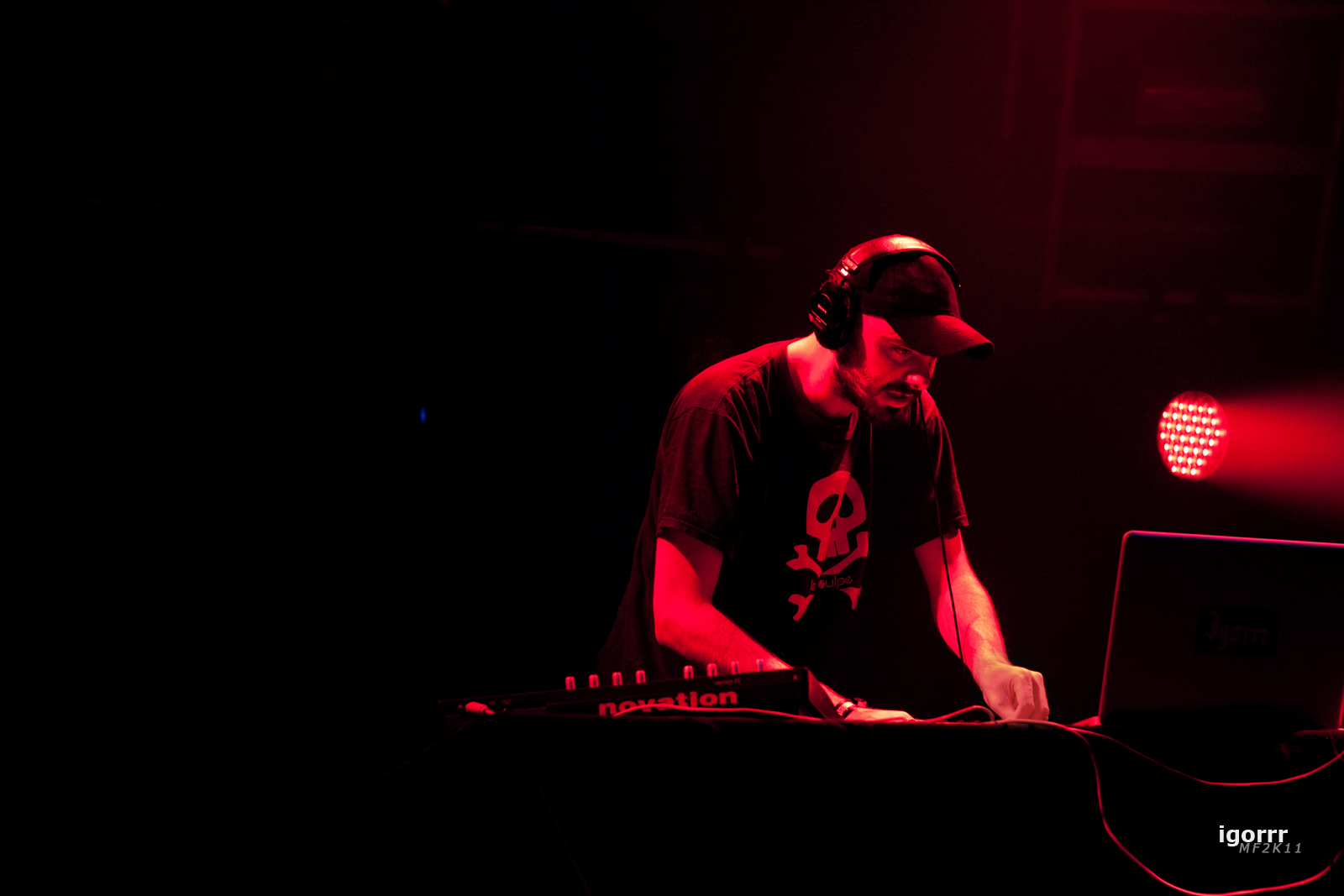
Gautier Serre, multi-instruments, vocals, in 2011

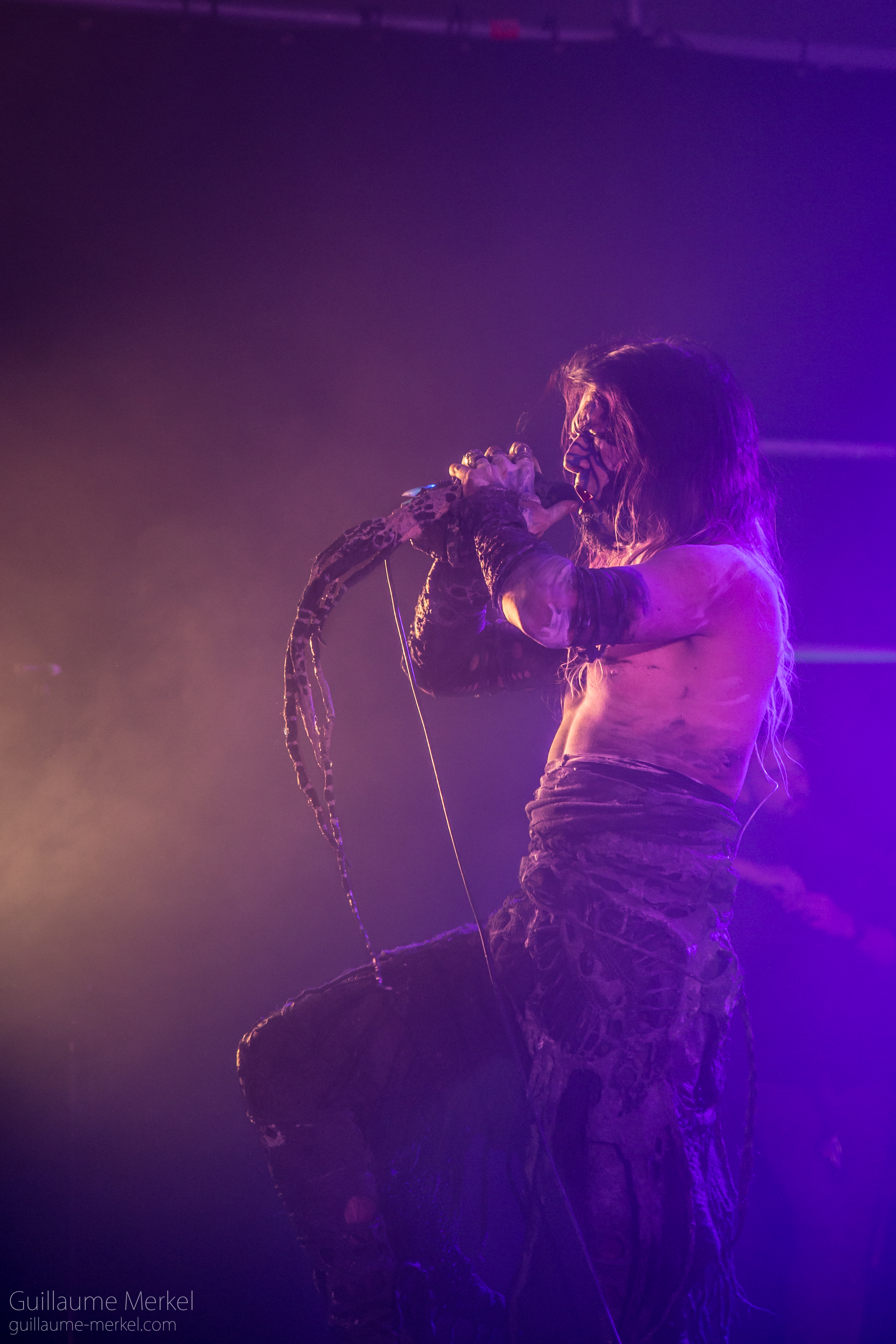
Laurent Lunoir, vocals, in 2017

Laure Le Prunenec, vocals, in 2018

Timeline

== Discography ==
Studio albums

- Nostril (2010)
- Hallelujah (2012)
- Savage Sinusoid (2017)
- Spirituality and Distortion (2020)
- Amen (2025)

Demos

- Oeil (2004)
- Poisson Soluble (2006)
- Moisissure (2008)

EPs

- Baroquecore (2010)
- Maigre with Ruby My Dear (2014)

with Whourkr

- Demo (2005)
- Naät (2007)
- Concrete (2008, reissued 2010)
- 4247 Snare Drums (2012)
- Naät + Concrete (2013, vinyl reissue)

with Corpo-Mente

- Corpo-Mente (2014)

Additional appearances

- Dorohedoro Original soundtrack (2016) - "Dorohedoro"
