= Incurso =

Studio album by Spawn of Possession
- Released: 13 March 2012
- Recorded: June–September 2011
- Studio: Pama Studio
- Genre: Technical death metal
- Length: 52:32
- Label: Relapse
- Producer: Magnus Sedenberg; Spawn of Possession

Spawn of Possession chronology
Noctambulant (2006)	Incurso (2012)

Professional ratings
Review scores
Source	Rating
AllMusic	4/5 stars
Sputnikmusic	4.5/5 stars
Metal Injection	9/10 stars

Incurso is the third and final studio album by Swedish death metal band Spawn of Possession, released in 2012. The album title is Latin for "I raid" or "I attack." It features two new band members, Christian Münzner on lead guitars and Erlend Caspersen on bass. The album has received very positive responses from fans and critics alike, as it is widely regarded as the best Spawn of Possession album up to date. Most of the positives went to describe how "Incurso is one of the rare highly technical albums that stay interesting and makes the listener to pay attention from the first to the last minute."

== Track listing ==
All lyrics are written by Dennis Röndum; all music is composed by Jonas Bryssling, except where noted.

No.	Title	Music	Length
1.	"Abodement" (instrumental)		1:40
2.	"Where Angels Go Demons Follow"		5:38
3.	"Bodiless Sleeper"		5:47
4.	"The Evangelist"		9:45
5.	"Servitude of Souls"	Bryssling; Erlend Caspersen	4:30
6.	"Deus Avertat"	Bryssling; Caspersen	5:38
7.	"Spiritual Deception"		6:34
8.	"No Light Spared"		4:37
9.	"Apparition"		8:24
Total length:			52:32

== Credits ==
Spawn of Possession

- Dennis Röndum – vocals
- Jonas Bryssling – guitar
- Christian Münzner – guitar
- Erlend Caspersen – bass
- Henrik Schönström – drums

Additional personnel

- Carl Löfvenhamn – orchestra conductor
- Jonas Karlsson – guitar solo on "No Light Spared"
- Spawn of Possession – engineering, production
- Jonas Nilsson – engineering
- Maxe Axelsson – mastering
- Magnus Sedenberg – mixing, engineering, mastering, production
- Pär Olofsson – artwork
