= Amen (Igorrr album) =

2025 album by Igorrr

Studio album by Igorrr
- Released: 19 September 2025
- Length: 44:14
- Label: Metal Blade
- Producer: Very Noise Family

Igorrr chronology
Spirituality and Distortion (2020)	Amen (2025)

Amen is the fifth studio album by French multi-instrumentalist Igorrr. It was released on 19 September 2025 as a digital download and 12" LP.

== Background ==
Igorrr's 2017 album Savage Sinusoid and follow-up album Spirituality and Distortion marked a shift in style towards a more organic approach featuring live instruments and natural acoustics, whilst the project shifted from a solo studio project to a full live band. Amen is a continuation on the theme, and experiments with less conventional instrumentation. Igorrr has indicated that the album is much darker and solemn in its themes than his previous work.

== Recording, production ==
A wide variety of live instrumentation was recorded for the album, with Igorrr recording vocals from a live choir inside of a church. He also recorded a nine-foot Tibetan dung-chen horn (typically used in Buddhist ceremonies).

Igorrr has also experimented with a less-conventional approach to percussion. On the track "Pure Disproportionate Black and White Nihilism", he hit snares with a giant hammer on a blacksmith's anvil for a more aggressive sound. On "Headbutt", Igorrr used an excavator to play the piano.

== Release, promotion, marketing ==
The first single from the album "ADHD" was released on 3 April 2025. Igorrr stated that the song is "kind of an autobiographical piece of music". The single was accompanied by a music video created by Meat Dept, which was created with AI assistance. The video has been described as a "symbolic journey into experimental therapy for treating a patient with ADHD.

On 21 May 2025, Igorrr released the second single from the album, "Blastbeat Falafel" which featured Trey Spruance on guitar, keyboard and vocals as well as violin and trumpet contributions from Timba Harris. The single includes influences from both metal and traditional oriental music and was accompanied with a music video.

On 26 June 2025, the third single from the album, "Infestis", was released. The song has been categorised as death metal.

The album was released on 19 September 2025 on Metal Blade Records.

Professional ratings
Review scores
Source	Rating
Blabbermouth	8/10
Metal Hammer	4/5 stars

== Artwork ==
The artwork was designed by Adrian Baxter, an illustrator who has worked with other bands including Paradise Lost, The Halo Effect and Dååth. His works are sketched using a pencil and then hand-inked using pigment liners. Digital colouring and adjustments are made afterwards.

== Touring ==
In support of the album, Igorrr announced a tour across UK and Europe, including 19 dates in October 2025. The initial announced dates have been noted as "Part 1" of a wider tour.

== Track listing ==
Amen track listing
No.	Title	Writer(s)	Length
1.	"Daemoni"	Gautier Serre; Martyn Clément; Jb Le Bail; Rémi Sérafino; Nils Cheville	4:09
2.	"Headbutt"	Serre; Marthe Alexandre; Clément; Le Bail	3:44
3.	"Limbo"	Serre; Alexandre; Clément; Cheville	4:41
4.	"Blastbeat Falafel" (featuring Trey Spruance)	Serre; Clément; Le Bail; Sérafino	3:14
5.	"ADHD"	Serre	4:33
6.	"2020"	Serre	0:12
7.	"Mustard Mucous" (featuring Scott Ian)	Serre; Clément; Le Bail; Sérafino	3:06
8.	"Infestis"	Serre; Clément	5:26
9.	"Ancient Sun"	Serre; Cheville	4:00
10.	"Pure Disproportionate Black and White Nihilism"	Serre; Le Bail; Sérafino; Cheville	3:51
11.	"Étude n°120"	Serre; Cheville	1:30
12.	"Silence"	Serre; Rémi Subjobert; Ben Violet	5:47
Total length:			44:14

== Personnel ==
Credits adapted from the CD release.

=== Igorrr ===
- Gautier Serre – synths, electronics, electric guitar, percussion, cowbell, electronics drums, flute, piano, theremin, saw, anvil
- JB Le Bail – harsh vocals
- Marthe Alexandre – clean vocals
- Rémi Serafino – drums
- Martyn Clément – electric guitars, synth

=== Additional contributors ===
- Nils Cheville – classical guitar, mohan veena, santoor, electric guitar (tracks 1, 3, 9, 10, 11)
- Timba Harris – strings (tracks 1, 4, 5, 9, 10)
- Mike Leon – electric bass guitar (tracks 1, 2, 3, 8, 10)
- Erland Caspersen – electric bass guitar (tracks 4, 5, 6, 7)
- Guilhem Fabre – piano (tracks 2, 3, 5, 12)
- Stephan Nicolay – choir direction (tracks 1, 2, 3, 4, 5, 7, 8, 10)
- Anthony Miranda – percussion, bouzouki, electric guitar, sitar (tracks 4, 5, 10)
- Dmitry Tarakanov – throat singing (track 1)
- Trey Spruance – electric guitar, saz, rabab (track 4)
- Sacha Vanony – flute (track 5)
- Antoine Souchaud – clavecin (track 5)
- Scott Ian – electric guitar (track 7)
- Gabriele Marzi – dung chen, percussion (track 8)
- Mali Yea – dung chen, percussion (track 8)
- Lili Refrain – lead vocals (track 9)
- Gabriela Gutierrez – harp (track 9)
- Ben Violet – strings (track 12)
- Very Noise Family – production
- Adrian Baxter – artwork

== Charts ==
Chart performance for Amen
Chart (2025)	Peak position
Austrian Albums (Ö3 Austria)	14
Belgian Albums (Ultratop Flanders)	109
Belgian Albums (Ultratop Wallonia)	132
French Albums (SNEP)	109
French Rock & Metal Albums (SNEP)	8
German Albums (Offizielle Top 100)	28
German Rock & Metal Albums (Offizielle Top 100)	9
Swedish Physical Albums (Sverigetopplistan)	13
Swiss Albums (Schweizer Hitparade)	33
UK Albums Sales (OCC)	85
UK Independent Albums (OCC)	32
UK Rock & Metal Albums (OCC)	14
US Top Current Album Sales (Billboard)	42
