= Deus Deceptor =

Studio album by NonExist
- Released: May 18, 2002
- Genre: Melodic death metal
- Length: 41:04
- Label: New Hawen/Century Media

NonExist chronology
Deus Deceptor (2002)	From My Cold Dead Hands (2012)

Professional ratings
Review scores
Source	Rating
AllMusic	2.5/5 stars

Deus Deceptor is the first full-length album by the Swedish death metal band NonExist.

== Track listing ==
No.	Title	Length
1.	"Entrance" (Instrumental)	1:52
2.	"The Devil Incarnate"	4:01
3.	"Faith"	3:19
4.	"Eaten Alive"	5:14
5.	"Ataraxia" (Instrumental)	1:43
6.	"A Halo Askew"	3:26
7.	"Phantoms"	3:00
8.	"Ebony Tower"	4:58
9.	"Nowhere" (Instrumental)	2:20
10.	"Delirious Tongues"	2:52
11.	"Divided We Fall"	4:24
12.	"Carnage Bloody Carnage" (Japanese edition bonus track)	1:39

== Personnel ==
- Johan Liiva – vocals
- Johan Reinholdz – guitar/bass
- Matte Modin – drums
