= Andromeda (Swedish band) =

Swedish progressive metal band

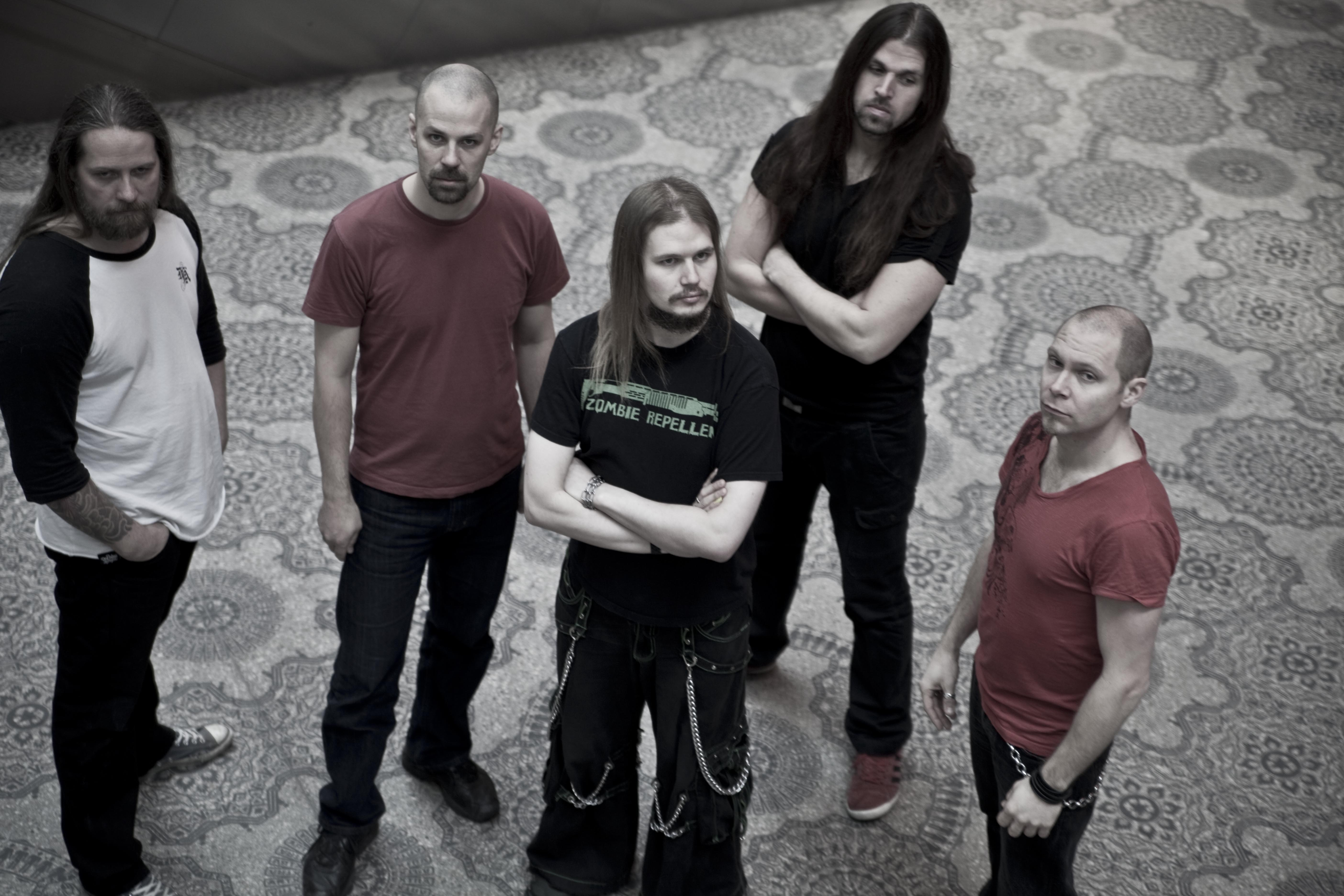
- Andromeda

Background information
- Origin: Sweden
- Genre: Progressive metal
- Years active: 1999 – present (hiatus since 2020)
- Labels: Massacre, Avalon, Marquee, Replica, Inner Wound
- Members: Johan Reinholdz; David Fremberg; Martin Hedin; Thomas Lejon; Linus "Mr. Gul" Abrahamson
- Past members: Lawrence Mackrory; Gert Daun; Fabian Gustavsson
- Website: andromeda.band

Andromeda is a progressive metal band from Sweden formed in 1999. They are currently signed to Massacre Records, Replica Records and Avalon/Marquee. The style emphasizes strong keyboards and technical drumming. The band is also well known for the vocals of David Fremberg.

They have recorded five albums as of 2011, as well as a live DVD. There are two versions of their first album, Extension of the Wish. The original recording features their first vocalist Lawrence Mackrory. The second version has all of the original instrument tracks, but with their replacement vocalist David Fremberg. The most recent album Manifest Tyranny was released in 2011.

In 2016 they released their second live DVD "Live in Vietnam", which was then made available to see on YouTube in 2020. The band has been on hold since then.

== Line-up ==
- Johan Reinholdz – guitar (also in Nonexist, Opus Atlantica, Skyfire, Dark Tranquillity)
- David Fremberg – vocals (also in Bloom)
- Thomas Lejon – drums (also in ACT, ex-Embraced, ex-Ominous)
- Martin Hedin – keyboards
- Linus "Mr. Gul" Abrahamson – bass

=== Former members ===
- Lawrence Mackrory – vocals (also in Seethings, ex-Darkane, Enemy Is Us)
- Gert Daun – bass
- Fabian Gustavsson – bass

== Discography ==
- Extension of the Wish - (2001, Century Media)
- II=I (Two Is One) (2003, Century Media)
- Extension of the Wish - Final Extension (Compilation) (2004)
- Chimera (2006, Massacre Records)
- Playing Off the Board (Live DVD) (2007, Metal Mind Productions)
- The Immunity Zone (2008, Nightmare Records)
- Manifest Tyranny (2011, Inner Wound Recordings)
- Live in Vietnam (Live DVD) (2016, Andromeda Rec.)
