= Timeless Departure =

Studio album by Skyfire
- Released: 12 March 2001
- Recorded: 1–14 August 2000, Abyss Studios
- Genre: Melodic death metal, power metal, black metal
- Length: 41:51
- Label: Hammerheart
- Producer: Tommy Tägtgren

Skyfire chronology
Timeless Departure (2001)	Mind Revolution (2003)

Professional ratings
Review scores
Source	Rating
Allmusic	2.5/5 stars
Chronicles of Chaos	8/10 stars
Rock Hard	4.5/10 stars

Timeless Departure is the debut full-length studio album by the Swedish melodic death metal band Skyfire, released on 12 March 2001 by Hammerheart Records. Common themes on the album include death, mysticism, and armageddon.

== Track listing ==
1. "Intro" – 2:05 [Music: Hanner/Edlund]
2. "Fragments of Time" – 3:32 [Music: Hanner/Reinholdz, Lyrics: Hanner/Björk]
3. "The Universe Unveils" – 4:56 [Music: Hanner/Edlund, Lyrics: Björk]
4. "By God Forsaken" – 4:57 [Music: Hanner/Edlund, Lyrics: Hanner]
5. "Timeless Departure" – 6:49 [Music: Edlund/Hanner, Lyrics: Björk]
6. "Breed Through Me, Bleed for Me" – 5:10 [Music: Hanner/Edlund, Lyrics: Hallin]
7. "Dimensions Unseen" – 4:54 [Music: Hanner/Edlund, Lyrics Björk/Wenngren]
8. "Skyfire" – 3:52 [Music: Edlund/Hanner, Lyrics: Björk]
9. "From Here to Death" – 5:32 [Music: Edlund/Hanner, Lyrics Björk]

The positions of track 4 "By God Forsaken" and track 8 "Skyfire" were juxtaposed on the original Hammerheart CD release's back insert due to a printing error. The 2013 digital re-release by Pivotal Rockordings corrected the mislabeled track listing.

== Credits ==
=== Band members ===
- Martin Hanner − guitar, keyboards
- Andreas Edlund − guitar, keyboards
- Jonas Sjögren − bass
- Henrik Wenngren − death vocals
- Tobias Björk − drums

=== Production and other ===
- Produced, engineered and mixed by Tommy Tägtgren and Skyfire.
- Mastered at Franky's Recording Kitchen by Berthus Westerhuys.
