= Chimera (Andromeda album) =

Studio album by Andromeda
- Released: 21 January 2006
- Recorded: Academy of Music, Malmö, Hedin 41 studios, Hedin High studios, Multipass studios. Sweden; Mar. 2004 - Jan. 2005
- Genre: Progressive metal
- Length: 64:16
- Label: Massacre Records; Replica Records; Marquee/Avalon
- Producer: Martin Hedin

Andromeda chronology
II=I (Two is One) (2003)	Chimera (2006)	The Immunity Zone (2007)

Chimera is the third album by the progressive metal band Andromeda, released in 2006.

The album was reviewed and received scores of 7/10 from Rockhard.de, and 8.5/10 from Metal Express Radio.

== Track listing ==
1. "Periscope" – 6:11
2. "In the End" – 4:58
3. "The Hidden Riddle" – 5:51
4. "Going Under" – 6:27
5. "The Cage of Me" – 7:08
6. "No Guidelines" – 6:23
7. "Inner Circle" – 7:03
8. "Iskenderun" – 5:30
9. "Blink of an Eye" – 9:29
10. "Chameleon Carnival" (Live) – 5:12 (Bonus. Japanese edition only)

== Personnel ==
=== Band ===
- Johan Reinholdz - Guitars
- David Fremberg - Vocals
- Fabian Gustavsson - Bass
- Thomas Lejon - Drums
- Martin Hedin - Keyboards and backing vocals

=== Other ===
- Andromeda - Engineer
- Patrik Ekeblom - Engineer
- Martin Hedin - Mastering and mixing
- David Fremberg - Layout
- Niklas Sundin - Artwork
- Daniel Andersson - Photos
