= In These Veins =

Studio album by Hearse
- Released: 25 October 2006
- Genre: Melodic death metal
- Length: 43:49
- Label: Dental Records

Hearse chronology
The Last Ordeal (2005)	In These Veins (2006)	Single Ticket To Paradise (2009)

In These Veins is the fourth album by the Swedish melodic death metal band Hearse.

== Track listing ==
1. "House of Love" - 06:07
2. "Corroding Armor" - 05:07
3. "Intoxication" - 03:28
4. "Naked Truth" - 04:04
5. "Crusade" - 02:56
6. "Among The Forlorn" - 04:24
7. "Atrocious Recoil" - 04:19
8. "Hearse" - 02:46
9. "In These Veins" - 05:15
10. "Mayfly Euphoria" (Japanese Bonus Track) - 05:23

== Credits ==
=== Hearse ===
- Johan Liiva - vocals
- Mattias Ljung - lead guitar
- Max Thornell - drums, rhythm guitar and bass guitar

=== Other Personnel ===
- Dan Swanö - mastering
- Pär Johansson - cover art
