= Hearse (band) =

Swedish melodic death metal band

- Origin: Sweden
- Genres: Melodic death metal, death 'n' roll
- Years active: 2001–present
- Members: Johan Liiva; Max Thornell; Mattias Ljung
- Website: hearse.se

Hearse is a Swedish melodic death metal band formed by vocalist Johan Liiva (ex-Arch Enemy) and drummer Max Thornell in 2001. The band have released five albums to date.

== History ==
After Johan Liiva departed NonExist, he formed a new project with Max Thornell. The duo recruited guitarist Mattias Ljung and recorded a demo in 2001. The band sent their first recording to metal press and labels, and attracted interest from Hammerheart Records. They signed a contract and released the single "Torch" in 2002. Debut album Dominion Reptilian followed in March 2003. In the summer of 2003, Hearse started recording their second album, Armageddon, Mon Amour. It was released in April 2004 on Karmageddon Media (formerly Hammerheart Records). Their third album, The Last Ordeal, was released in 2005, and their fourth release, In These Veins, was released in 2006 on Cold Records. In 2009, Hearse released their fifth album, Single Ticket To Paradise. A music video for the song "Sundown" was produced.

== Band members ==
- Johan Liiva – vocals
- Max Thornell – drums
- Mattias Ljung – guitars

Session and touring

- Jocke "Skägget" Knutsson – bass

== Discography ==
=== Full-length ===
- Dominion Reptilian (2003)
- Armageddon, Mon Amour (2004)
- The Last Ordeal (2005)
- In These Veins (2006)
- Single Ticket to Paradise (2009)

=== Demos ===
- Hearse (2002)

=== EPs ===
- Torch (2002)
- Cambodia (2005)

== See also ==
- Arch Enemy
- Johan Liiva
