= Manifest Tyranny =

Studio album by Andromeda
- Released: 21 November 2011
- Genre: Progressive metal
- Length: 63:59
- Label: Inner Wound Recordings

Andromeda chronology
The Immunity Zone (2008)	Manifest Tyranny (2011)

Manifest Tyranny is the fifth full-length album by progressive metal band Andromeda.

The album was reviewed with 8/10 by Powermetal.de, 9/10 by Metal.de, but only 6.5/10 by Rockhard.de.

== Track listing ==
1. "Preemptive Strike" - 2:32
2. "Lies 'R' Us" - 5:19
3. "Stay Unaware" - 6:21
4. "Survival of the Richest" - 6:02
5. "False Flag" - 9:38
6. "Chosen By God" - 4:35
7. "Asylum" - 7:03
8. "Play Dead" - 7:47
9. "Go Back to Sleep" - 7:40
10. "Antidote" - 7:02

== Personnel ==
- David Fremberg - vocals
- Johan Reinholdz - guitars
- Thomas Lejon - drums
- Martin Hedin - keyboards
- Fabian Gustavsson - bass
