= Extension of the Wish =

Studio album by Andromeda
- Released: May 29, 2001
- Recorded: March–April 2000
- Studio: Dug Out Productions, Uppsala, Sweden
- Genre: Progressive metal
- Length: 44:13
- Label: Century Media
- Producer: Andromeda; Daniel Bergstrand

Andromeda chronology
Extension of the Wish (2001)	II=I (Two is One) (2003)

Extension of the Wish is the debut album by Andromeda.

The album has been reviewed with 2/5 by Allmusic, and 8.5/10 by Rockhard.de (review of the "definitive edition").

== Track listing ==
(All music and lyrics by Johan Reinholdz)

1. "The Words Unspoken" – 5:28
2. "Crescendo of Thoughts" – 5:24
3. "In the Deepest of Waters" – 7:07
4. "Chameleon Carneval" – 4:59
5. "Starshooter Supreme" – 5:18
6. "Extension of the Wish" – 10:03
7. "Arch Angel" – 5:54
8. "Journey of Polyspheric Experience" (definitive edition bonus track) - 5:42

== Credits ==
=== Band ===
- Johan Reinholdz - Guitar
- Martin Hedin - Keyboards
- Thomas Lejon - Drums
- Gert Daun - Bass
- Lawrence Mackrory - Session Vocalist

=== Other ===
- Daniel Bergstrand - Engineer
- Johan Reinholdz - Engineer
- Staffan "Hitman" Olofsson - Mastering
- Niklas Sundin - Graphics/Art direction
- Dennis Tencic - Layout
- Wez Wenedikter - Executive producer
