= Savage Sinusoid =

Studio album by Igorrr
- Released: 16 June 2017
- Studio: Improve Tone
- Length: 39:26
- Label: Metal Blade

Igorrr chronology
Hallelujah (2012)	Savage Sinusoid (2017)	Spirituality and Distortion (2020)

Singles from Savage Sinusoid
- 1. "ieuD" Released: 11 April 2017; 2. "Opus Brain" Released: 4 May 2017; 3. "Cheval" Released: 6 June 2017

Savage Sinusoid is the third album by Gautier Serre, under his alias Igorrr, released on Metal Blade Records on June 16, 2017.

== Background ==
Igorrr signed with Metal Blade Records in early 2017. The album was preceded by the singles "ieuD", "Opus Brain", and "Cheval".

Unlike previous albums, the album did not feature any samples. Travis Ryan from the band Cattle Decapitation guests on three tracks.

Serre cited Taraf de Haïdouks, Cannibal Corpse and Aphex Twin as inspiration for the album.

== Critical reception ==
Professional ratings
Review scores
Source	Rating
AllMusic	4/5 stars
Angry Metal Guy	3.5/5 stars
It Djents	5/5 stars
Kill Your Stereo	4/5 stars
Metal Hammer	4/5 stars
Metal Injection	5/5 stars
Metal Temple	5/5 stars
Pure Grain Audio	3.5/5 stars
Soundscape	5/5 stars
Sputnikmusic	4/5 stars

The album received critical acclaim.

Metal Injection, as well as giving it a perfect 10/10 score, named it the "Batshit Crazy Album of the Year". They concluded in their review, "Igorrr is a project with no boundaries, and the personal belief of creating the art one wants to. In a world where we argue from the mainstream radio to the underground scene, Igorrr is a breath of fresh air. Savage Sinusoid isn’t just a breath of fresh air in musical technicality and emotion though, but an excellent reminder to just enjoy music." Additionally, they ranked the album 9th on their year end rankings of every album.

AllMusic stated "Serre's fusion of acoustic and electronic instruments is tighter and more refined than ever, and while Savage Sinusoid sounds unmistakably like an Igorrr album, he hasn't come close to sounding predictable yet."

Dom Lawson of Metal Hammer wrote, "Igorrr exist in a world where borders between genres are non-existent and anything is possible, albeit with a preference for being wildly unpredictable", and saw "much subtlety offsetting the shifts of pace and mood and some spellbinding moments of serene but subversive finesse", concluding: "If only more metal records were this barmy."

== Track listing ==
All tracks are written by Gautier Serre.

No.	Title	Length
1.	"Viande"	1:55
2.	"ieuD"	3:55
3.	"Houmous"	3:31
4.	"Opus Brain"	5:25
5.	"Problème d'émotion"	4:38
6.	"Spaghetti Forever"	4:24
7.	"Cheval"	3:06
8.	"Apopathodiaphulatophobie"	2:02
9.	"Va te foutre"	1:45
10.	"Robert"	3:19
11.	"Au Revoir"	5:26

== Personnel ==
=== Igorrr ===
- Gautier Serre – music, guitar, piano, electronics, recording, mixing, mastering

=== Additional musicians ===
- Laurent Lunoir – vocals (1–4, 6–8, 10)
- Laure Le Prunenec – soprano (2–8, 10, 11)
- Sylvain Bouvier – drums (1–4, 6–11)
- Katerina Chrobokova – harpsichord (2, 4, 8, 9)
- Erlend Caspersen – bass (2–4, 7–11)
- Travis Ryan – vocals (7, 8, 10)
- Morten Iversen – guitar (1), bass (1)
- Benjamin Violet – strings (4–7, 11)
- Pierre Mussi – accordion (3, 7)
- Antony Miranda – sitar (4), additional drums (4), surf guitar (2)
- Nils Cheville – classical guitar (3, 4, 6, 11), santoor (4)
- Yann Le Glaz – saxophone (3, 10)
- Benjamin Bardiaux – piano (11)
- Nicolas Seguin – piano (11)
- Adam Stacey – accordion (3)
- Pedrou Lacasa – mandolin (7), balkan vocals (7)
- Jasmina Barra – balkan vocals (7)
- Stuart Dickson – percussion (3)
- Aymeric Thomas – 8 bit sounds (3)
- Patrick – chicken (3)

=== Technical personnel ===
- Hervé Faivre – recording
- Metastazis – artwork

== Charts ==
Chart (2017)	Peak position
Belgian Albums (Ultratop Flanders)	173
