= Skyfire (band) =

Swedish melodic death metal band

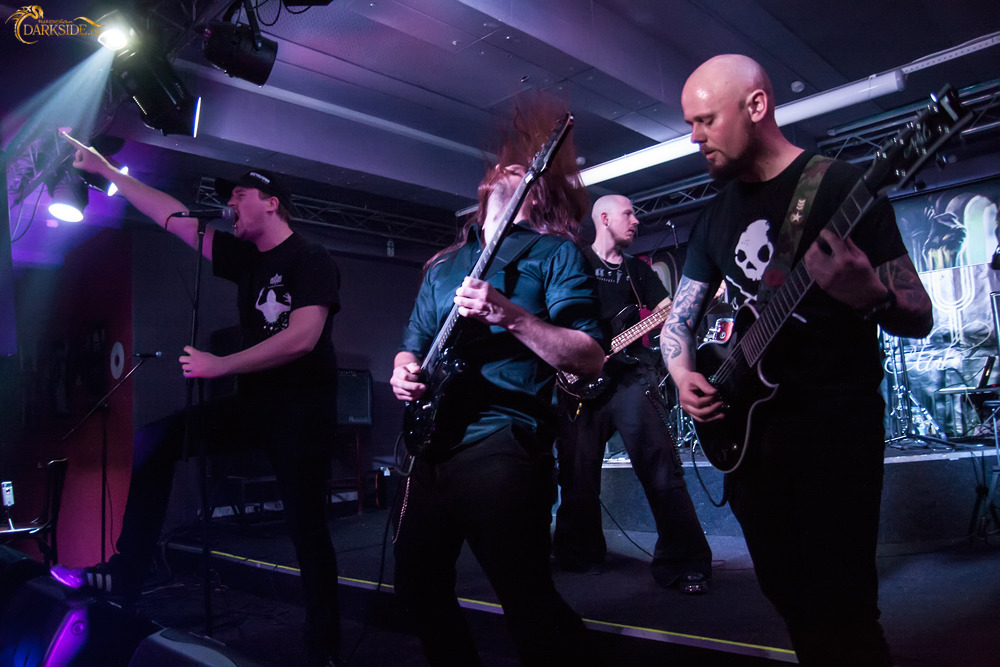
- Skyfire performing in 2013

Background information
- Origin: Höör, Sweden
- Genres: Melodic death metal, power metal, progressive metal
- Years active: 1995–present (on hold since 2017)
- Labels: Arise, Hammerheart, Pivotal Rockordings
- Members: Martin Hanner; Joakim Jonsson; Johan Reinholdz; Joakim Karlsson
- Past members: Andreas Edlund; Tobias Björk; Jonas Sjögren; Henrik Wenngren
- Website: skyfireonline.net

Skyfire is a Swedish melodic death metal band from Höör, Skåne County. Formed in 1995, its initial lineup comprised Andreas Edlund (guitar), Martin Hanner (bass guitar), Jonas Sjögren (guitar) and Tobias Björk (drums). The band's lineup has significantly changed since its inception. The band has released four albums and five extended plays.

== Biography ==
Andreas Edlund (guitar), Martin Hanner (bass guitar), Jonas Sjögren (guitar), and Tobias Björk (drums) formed Skyfire in Höör, Sweden, in 1995. The four knew each other since high school and had similar musical taste. The band recorded the demos Within Reach and The Final Story. Henrik Wenngren sang on the latter. Skyfire got in touch with members of Thyrfing, who helped them find Dutch label Hammerheart Records. During two weeks in August 2000, Skyfire recorded their debut album, Timeless Departure, in the Abyss Studio.

In September 2002, the band recorded their second album, Mind Revolution, in the Abyss Studio with new drummer Joakim Jonsson. Mind Revolution was released in 2003 and branched the band's style off into different genres. The third album, Spectral, was recorded at Los Angered and Studio Underground and released on 10 May 2004 by Arise Records.

Wenngren left the band and Joakim Karlsson replaced him.

On 7 January 2008, Skyfire signed with a three-album deal with Florida-based label Pivotal Rockordings. The band began recording their fourth, untitled album. Mixing was done by Scar Symmetry's Jonas Kjellgren at Black Lounge Studios.

On 15 May 2009, Skyfire announced the digital-only EP Fractal for a July 2009 release. The EP is a collection of B-sides recorded between 2004's Spectral and Esoteric. Fractal was released on 6 July for digital download.

Skyfire's fourth album, Esoteric, was released on 14 September 2009 in the United Kingdom via Pivotal Rockordings. The album was released on 18 September 2009 in the rest of Europe and in North America on 13 October 2009 due to a scheduling issue. The cover art was created by Pär Olofsson, who made covers for Brain Drill, Psycroptic, Spawn of Possession, Persuader and others.

On 4 July 2017, the band launched a PledgeMusic campaign to fund the EP Liberation in Death. The campaign raised the full amount needed in under eight hours. The band has been on hold since then.

== Musical style ==
Skyfire has been described as a variety of genres including melodic death metal, power metal, symphonic metal, neo-classical metal, progressive metal, black metal, and progressive death metal.

== Band members ==
=== Current ===
- Martin Hanner − bass (2005−present); guitar (1995−2005), keyboards (1995−present)
- Joakim Jonsson − drums, guitar (2001−present)
- Johan Reinholdz − guitar (2005−present)
- Joakim Karlsson − vocals (2007−present)

=== Former ===
- Andreas Edlund − guitar, keyboards (1995−2015)
- Tobias Björk − drums (1995−2001)
- Jonas Sjögren − bass (1995−2005)
- Henrik Wenngren − vocals (1998−2007)

== Discography ==
=== Studio albums ===
- Timeless Departure (2001)
- Mind Revolution (2003)
- Spectral (2004)
- Esoteric (2009)

=== Demos and EPs ===
- Within Reach (1998)
- The Final Story (2000)
- Haunted by Shadows (2003)
- Fractal (2009)
- Liberation in Death (2017)
