= Mind Revolution =

Studio album by Skyfire
- Released: 5 May 2003
- Genres: Melodic death metal, melodic black metal, power metal, progressive metal
- Length: 43:42
- Label: Hammerheart

Skyfire chronology
Timeless Departure (2001)	Mind Revolution (2003)	Spectral (2004)

Mind Revolution is the second studio album by Swedish melodic death metal band Skyfire, released on 5 May 2003 by Hammerheart Records. In a continuing trend, "Mind Revolution" focuses on insanity, isolation, loneliness, and the self. The Korean release of the album features four bonus songs; "The Final Story", "Skyfire" (Demo), "By God Forsaken" (Demo) and "Free From Torment". The 10th anniversary digital re-release of the album also features "Free From Torment", along with all tracks from the 1998 demo Within Reach.

== Track listing ==
1. "Nightmares Nevermore" – 3:16
2. "Haunted by Shadows" – 5:27
3. "Colliding in Mind" – 4:23
4. "Dawn Will Break" – 3:37
5. "Uncloud the Sky" – 4:52
6. "Shapes of Insanity" – 6:00
7. "Blinded by Euphoria" – 4:40
8. "Caged" – 4:01
9. "Mind Revolution" – 6:55
10. "Free From Torment" (Japanese bonus track) − 4:41

Korean release bonus track listing

1. "The Final Story" − 1:39
2. "Skyfire" (Demo) − 3:58
3. "By God Forsaken" (Demo) − 5:00
4. "Free From Torment" − 4:41

2013 re-release bonus track listing

1. "Free From Torment" − 4:41
2. "Within Reach" (Demo) − 3:39
3. "Faces" (Demo) − 5:34
4. "Open Flower" (Demo) − 5:52

== Credits ==
- Martin Hanner − guitar, keyboards
- Andreas Edlund − guitar, keyboards
- Jonas Sjögren − bass
- Henrik Wenngren − death vocals
- Joakim Jonsson − drums, additional guitar
