= Spawn of Possession =

Swedish technical death metal band

- Origin: Kalmar, Sweden
- Genres: Technical death metal
- Years active: 1997–2017
- Labels: Relapse, Neurotic, Unique Leader
- Past members: Dennis Röndum; Jonas Bryssling; Christian Muenzner; Erlend Caspersen; Henrik Schönström; Richard Schill; Matthew "Chalky" Chalk; Ben Lawless; Jonas Karlsson; Niklas Dewerud

Spawn of Possession was a Swedish technical death metal group, which formed in 1997 in Kalmar. The band have collectively released three studio albums. A fourth album was planned, but in 2017 the band announced their split up. In 2024, four of the five members of the final lineup reformed into the band Retromorphosis.

== History ==
Spawn of Possession formed in February 1997, consisting of Jonas Bryssling (guitar), Jonas Karlsson (guitar), and Dennis Röndum (drums).

After three years the band recorded their first demo, The Forbidden, and right after found bass guitar player Nick Dewerud to fill the empty bass spot. A year later the band went to the studio to record their second demo, Church of Deviance, and in December 2001 Spawn of Possession signed a deal with Unique Leader Records.

The band worked on new material for the next six months and in June 2002 began recording their debut album, Cabinet. The band ended up in the Pama Studios together with the highly acclaimed producer and engineer Magnus Sedenberg with whom they had worked on previous recordings, and released Cabinet.

To promote the album, they first toured Europe for four weeks, together with Disavowed, Vile, Inhume, and Mangled. Shortly after followed a six-week North American tour together with Unique Leader label mates Severed Savior, Pyaemia, and Gorgasm. Travelling coast to coast including a five gigs ride to Canada, they played no less than 27 shows on this tour.

After coming back from the US came another European tour, as part of the annual No Mercy package, with bands such as Cannibal Corpse, Hypocrisy, Kataklysm, Exhumed, Vomitory, and Carpathian Forest. After this spring-tour summerfestival the band perform at eight festivals, including Fuck the Commerce (Germany), Stonehenge (Netherlands), Grind You Mother (Italy), and Mountains of Death (Switzerland).

During this period and the beginning of fall 2004, Spawn of Possession also started to work on new material. In mid-September the band joined Cannibal Corpse as direct support on a 24 show tour throughout Scandinavia and the Baltic/Eastern European states. The successor to the second album is titled Noctambulant and was released in July 2006 by Neurotic Records.

On 11 May 2009, the band posted a small preproduction teaser from their as yet untitled new album, commenting that they wanted "to finally break the silence". There are five finished songs and seven others still in the works. The band also explained that "additional lineup changes will be announced soon".

On 24 June 2009, Jonas Bryssling confirmed on Spawn of Possession's message board that Matthew Chalk (ex-Psycroptic, Mephistopheles) and Christian Muenzner (ex-Obscura, ex-Necrophagist) have joined the band. Bryssling states "Two very talented and competent musicians has recently joined Spawn of Possession. Matthew Chalk (Ex-Psycroptic) is going to handle the vocal and lyric writing. Christian Muenzner (ex-Obscura, ex-Necrophagist) is going to do the Lead Guitar part and unleash his madness into the multicoloured and distorted universe of Spawn of Possession. The Line-up is now complete." In the same year, Norwegian bassist Erlend Caspersen (Blood Red Throne, The Allseeing I), known for his highly technical playing, also joined the band to complete the lineup.

However in September 2010, Dennis Rondum joined back and will handle the vocals instead of Chalky who just joined for a brief period.

In December 2010, Richard Shill has been relieved from drumming duties. The reason cited was that Richard depends very much on actual band practice and with SoP members being scattered all over Sweden, Norway and Germany band practice becomes an impossibility. Henrik Schönström announced as new drummer.

On 13 March 2012, with three new members, Spawn of Possession released their third retail album, Incurso, which was met with very positive reactions from fans and critics alike, being their most technical and heavy record up to date. It is often being dubbed as 'one of the most influential modern death metal records, next to Necrophagist's Epitaph and Obscura's Cosmogenesis, all of which Muenzner performed on. However, most of the music was written by Jonas Bryssling with assistance of Erlend Caspersen on certain songs.

On 4 August 2017 the band announced on Facebook they were breaking up, stating:

Last week we decided to put SoP to rest due to several problems, mostly because we now realise we dont have the time to either finish a beast like a new album properly or do anything else with SoP for a long time. So the band has pretty much just faded away at this point. Anyway! We are very thankful for all the support we had through the years! Cheers!

== Musical style and influences ==
Spawn of Possession have been influenced by many different artists from various subgenres, mainly from death metal and classical music. They have been influenced by artists such as Death, Monstrosity, Nocturnus, Morbid Angel, Suffocation, Cannibal Corpse, Gorguts, Dismember, Edge of Sanity, and Carcass as well as art music composers such as Johann Sebastian Bach, Sylvius Leopold Weiss and Dmitri Shostakovich. Despite the band's Swedish nationality, Metal Hammer stated the opinion that the band's "brand of death metal just doesn’t sound that Swedish at all."

== Members ==
Final line-up

- Dennis Röndum − drums (1997−2006), vocals (1997−2006, 2010−2017)
- Jonas Bryssling − guitar (1997–2017)
- Christian Münzner − guitar (2009–2017)
- Erlend Caspersen − bass (2008–2017)
- Henrik Schönström − drums (2010–2017)

Live musicians

- Mikael Petersson − vocals (2001)
- Ben Lawless − guitar (2010)
- Danny Tunker − guitar (2012)

Former members

- Jonas Hagström − bass (1997−2000)
- Jonas Karlsson − guitar (1997−2009)
- Niklas Dewerud − bass (2000−2008)
- Kelly Izquierdo − vocals (2002−2003)
- Jonas Renvaktar − vocals (2003−2009)
- Richard Schill − drums (2008−2010)
- Matthew "Chalky" Chalk − vocals (2009−2010)

Timeline

== Discography ==
Studio albums

- Cabinet (2003)
- Noctambulant (2006)
- Incurso (2012)

Demos

- The Forbidden (demo, 2000)
- Church of Deviance (demo, 2001)
