= Two Is One (Andromeda album) =

II=I

Studio album by Andromeda
- Released: 11 March 2003
- Recorded: Academy of Music, Malmö, Sweden; Nov. 2001 - Aug. 2002
- Genre: Progressive metal
- Length: 65:10
- Label: Century Media
- Producer: Martin Hedin

Andromeda chronology
Extension of the Wish (2001)	II=I (2003)	Chimera (2006)

Professional ratings
Review scores
Source	Rating
Allmusic	1.5/5 stars

II=I (Two is One) is the second album by the progressive metal band Andromeda, released in 2003.

The album received reviews of 1.5/5 from Allmusic, 7/10 from Metal.de, 8.5/10 from DPRP, and Powermetal.de.

== Track listing ==
1. "Encyclopedia" – 7:08
2. "Mirages" – 5:42
3. "Reaching Deep Within" – 4:50
4. "Two Is One" – 9:05
5. "Morphing Into Nothing" – 7:35
6. "Castaway" – 6:17
7. "Parasite" – 6:55
8. "One In My Head" – 8:03
9. "This Fragile Surface" – 8:05

== Credits ==
=== Band ===
- Johan Reinholdz – guitar, bass
- David Fremberg – vocals
- Martin Hedin – keyboards
- Thomas Lejon – drums

=== Other ===
- Martin Hedin - Engineer
- Göran Finnberg - Mastering
- Mattias Norén - Artwork and layout
- Andromeda - Executive producer
- Freddy Billqvist - Photos
