= The Last Ordeal =

Studio album by Hearse
- Released: 1 August 2005
- Recorded: White Chapel Studios
- Genre: Melodic death metal
- Length: 41:36
- Label: Karmageddon Media
- Producer: Jonas Elder

Hearse chronology
Armageddon, Mon Amour (2004)	The Last Ordeal (2005)	In These Veins (2006)

The Last Ordeal is the third album by the Swedish melodic death metal band Hearse.

== Track listing ==
No.	Title	Length
1.	"Pathfinder"	5:20
2.	"Quintessence"	4:39
3.	"Shackles of Guilt"	4:52
4.	"Ambrosia" (Instrumental)	2:05
5.	"Una Lucha a Muerte"	4:55
6.	"Bountyhunter"	5:49
7.	"Demon Curd" (Instrumental)	2:41
8.	"Aggravation"	4:32
9.	"The Last Ordeal"	6:40
