= Armageddon, Mon Amour =

Studio album by Hearse
- Released: 6 April 2004
- Recorded: Basement Audio System
- Genres: Melodic death metal, death 'n' roll
- Length: 46:38
- Label: Candlelight Records
- Producer: Jonas Elder

Hearse chronology
Dominion Reptilian (2003)	Armageddon, Mon Amour (2004)	The Last Ordeal (2005)

Professional ratings
Review scores
Source	Rating
Allmusic	3/5 stars

Armageddon, Mon Amour is the second album by the Swedish melodic death metal band Hearse.

== Track listing ==
No.	Title	Length
1.	"Mountain of the Solar Eclipse"	5:11
2.	"Turncoat"	5:05
3.	"Crops of Waste"	4:41
4.	"In Love and War"	5:15
5.	"Ticket to Devastation"	1:29
6.	"Tools"	4:29
7.	"Cambodia" (Kim Wilde cover)	3:23
8.	"Sodi" (Instrumental)	1:17
9.	"Play Without Rules"	4:45
10.	"Determination"	4:38
11.	"Armageddon, Mon Amour"	6:25

"Armaggedon, mon amour" is French for "Armageddon, my love", which is inspired by the film Hiroshima mon amour.
