= Dominion Reptilian =

Studio album by Hearse
- Released: May 3, 2003
- Studio: Dog Pound Studios (Stockholm)
- Genre: Melodic death metal
- Length: 43:28
- Label: Hammerheart Records

Hearse chronology
Dominion Reptilian (2003)	Armageddon, Mon Amour (2004)

Dominion Reptilian is the first album by the Swedish melodic death metal band Hearse. It was recorded at Dog Pound Studios in Stockholm.

== Track listing ==
1. "Dominion Reptilian" - 03:50
2. "Torch" - 04:43
3. "Cosmic Daughter" - 04:14
4. "Contemplation" - 04:43
5. "Rapture In Twilight" - 04:53
6. "Well Of Youth" - 04:10
7. "Abandoned" - 03:30
8. "End Of Days" - 04:43
9. "So Vague" - 08:42

=== Bonus tracks ===
- "The Unknown" - 4:46*
- "Avalon" - 4:00*

"The Unknown" and "Avalon" are bonus tracks on the digipak version.
