= Pforzheim =

City in Baden-Württemberg, Germany

- City
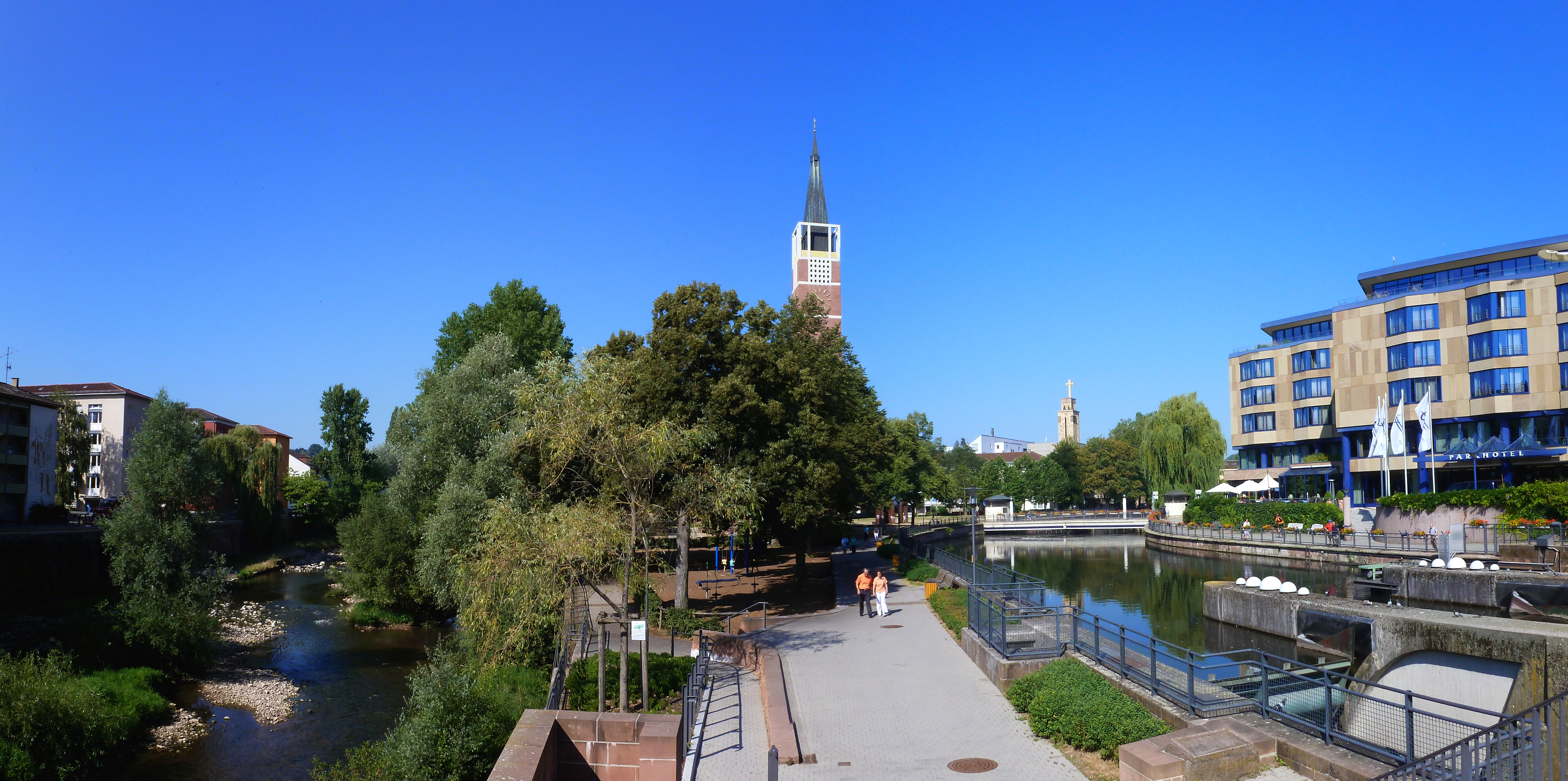

- Flag Coat of arms
- Interactive map of Pforzheim
- Location within Germany Location within Baden-Württemberg
- Coordinates: 48°53′42″N 08°42′18″E
- Country: Germany
- State: Baden-Württemberg
- Admin. region: Karlsruhe
- District: Stadtkreis
- Subdivisions: 16 Stadtteile

Government
  - Mayor (2017–25): Peter Boch (CDU)

Area
  - Total: 98.07 km^{2} (37.87 sq mi)
- Elevation: 273 m (896 ft)

Population (2025-12-31)
  - Total: 134,422
  - Density: 1,371/km^{2} (3,550/sq mi)
- Time zone: UTC+01:00 (CET)
  - Summer (DST): UTC+02:00 (CEST)
- Postal codes: 75172–75181
- Dialling codes: 07231, 07234, 07041
- Vehicle registration: PF
- Website: www.pforzheim.de

Pforzheim (German: [ˈpfɔʁtshaɪm]) is a city of over 135,000 inhabitants in the federal state of Baden-Württemberg, in the southwest of Germany.

It is known for its jewelry and watch-making industry, and as such has gained the nickname Goldstadt ("Gold City"). With an area of 97.8 square kilometres (37.8 sq mi), it is situated about halfway between the cities of Stuttgart and Karlsruhe at the confluence of three rivers (Enz, Nagold and Würm). It lies on the border of Baden and Württemberg, on the Baden side. From 1535 to 1565, it was the home to the Margraves of Baden-Durlach.

The City of Pforzheim is a Stadtkreis, meaning it is both a municipality and a district at the same time. Also, it hosts the administrative offices of the Enz district that surrounds the city.

During World War II, Pforzheim was bombed by the Allies a number of times. The largest raid, and one of the most devastating area bombardments of World War II, was carried out by the Royal Air Force (RAF) on the evening of 23 February 1945. Nearly one third of the town's population, 17,600 people, were killed in the air raid, and about 83% of the town's buildings were destroyed. The Allies believed that precision instruments were being produced here for use in the German war effort and that the town was a transport centre for the movement of German troops.

From 1945 to 1948, Pforzheim (after the initial French occupation) was administered by the United States military and was part of the short-lived state of Württemberg-Baden. In the 20 years following the end of the war, Pforzheim was gradually rebuilt. The town reflects the architecture of the postwar period and has some landmark buildings of the 1950s.

== Geography ==
Pforzheim is located at the northern rim of the eastern part of the Black Forest (Schwarzwald) and the rim of the hilly country of the Kraichgau, in an open valley at the confluences of the rivers Würm and Nagold, as well as the rivers Nagold and Enz. Due to its location, this city is also called the "three-valleys town" (Drei-Täler Stadt) or the "Gateway to the Black Forest" (Pforte zum Schwarzwald / Porta Hercynia).

Pforzheim and its surrounding area belongs to the "Densely Populated Area Karlsruhe/Pforzheim". Pforzheim has the functions of a regional center (Mittelzentrum) for the towns and municipalities Birkenfeld (Enz), Eisingen, Engelsbrand, Friolzheim, Heimsheim, Ispringen, Kämpfelbach, Keltern, Kieselbronn, Königsbach-Stein, Mönsheim, Neuenbürg, Neuhausen, Neulingen, Niefern-Öschelbronn, Ölbronn-Dürrn, Remchingen, Straubenhardt, Tiefenbronn, Wiernsheim, Wimsheim and Wurmberg.

=== Neighbouring communities ===
The following towns and communities share borderlines with the City of Pforzheim. Below they are mentioned in clockwise order, beginning to the north of the city. Except for Unterreichenbach, which belongs to the district of Calw, all of them are part of the Enz district.

Ispringen, Neulingen, Kieselbronn, Niefern-Öschelbronn, Wurmberg, Wimsheim, Friolzheim, Tiefenbronn, Neuhausen (Enz), Unterreichenbach, Engelsbrand, Birkenfeld (Enz), Keltern and Kämpfelbach.

=== City wards ===
The city of Pforzheim consists of 16 city wards. The communities Büchenbronn, Eutingen an der Enz, Hohenwart, Huchenfeld and Würm, which by way of the latest regional administrative reform during the 1970s were incorporated into Pforzheim's administration, are represented by independent community councils and community administrations. In important matters concerning any of these communities the opinions of the respective community councils must be taken into consideration. However, final decisions on the matter will be made by the Pforzheim city council.

- City center (Innenstadt)
- Northern ward (Nordstadt)
- Eastern ward (Oststadt)
- Southeastern ward (Südoststadt)
- Southwestern ward (Südweststadt)
- Western ward (Weststadt)
- Arlinger
- Brötzingen
- Buckenberg and Hagenschieß; including Altgefäll, Haidach and Wald-Siedlung
- Büchenbronn including Sonnenberg
- Sonnenhof
- Dillweißenstein
- Eutingen an der Enz including Mäuerach
- Hohenwart
- Huchenfeld
- Würm

=== Climate ===
Climate data for Karlsruhe normals 1991-10/2008, Rheinstetten normals 11/2008-2020, extremes 1948–2020
Month	Jan	Feb	Mar	Apr	May	Jun	Jul	Aug	Sep	Oct	Nov	Dec	Year
Record high °C (°F)	17.5 (63.5)	22.0 (71.6)	26.7 (80.1)	30.4 (86.7)	33.3 (91.9)	37.3 (99.1)	39.2 (102.6)	40.2 (104.4)	33.2 (91.8)	29.5 (85.1)	22.0 (71.6)	19.2 (66.6)	40.2 (104.4)
Mean maximum °C (°F)	13.2 (55.8)	15.6 (60.1)	20.3 (68.5)	25.9 (78.6)	29.5 (85.1)	33.3 (91.9)	35.2 (95.4)	34.4 (93.9)	28.7 (83.7)	23.9 (75.0)	17.3 (63.1)	13.5 (56.3)	36.5 (97.7)
Mean daily maximum °C (°F)	5.3 (41.5)	7.3 (45.1)	12.1 (53.8)	17.1 (62.8)	21.0 (69.8)	24.7 (76.5)	27.0 (80.6)	26.8 (80.2)	21.8 (71.2)	16.0 (60.8)	9.5 (49.1)	6.0 (42.8)	16.2 (61.2)
Daily mean °C (°F)	2.5 (36.5)	3.5 (38.3)	7.1 (44.8)	11.2 (52.2)	15.3 (59.5)	18.9 (66.0)	20.8 (69.4)	20.4 (68.7)	15.8 (60.4)	11.1 (52.0)	6.3 (43.3)	3.3 (37.9)	11.4 (52.4)
Mean daily minimum °C (°F)	−0.3 (31.5)	-0.0 (32.0)	2.5 (36.5)	5.3 (41.5)	9.4 (48.9)	13.0 (55.4)	15.0 (59.0)	14.6 (58.3)	10.7 (51.3)	7.1 (44.8)	3.2 (37.8)	0.6 (33.1)	6.8 (44.2)
Mean minimum °C (°F)	−8.7 (16.3)	−7.0 (19.4)	−3.8 (25.2)	−1.4 (29.5)	2.8 (37.0)	7.5 (45.5)	10.2 (50.4)	9.3 (48.7)	5.0 (41.0)	0.4 (32.7)	−3.3 (26.1)	−7.5 (18.5)	−11.3 (11.7)
Record low °C (°F)	−20.0 (−4.0)	−15.9 (3.4)	−14.6 (5.7)	−5.3 (22.5)	−0.9 (30.4)	3.6 (38.5)	6.9 (44.4)	6.3 (43.3)	1.4 (34.5)	−4.1 (24.6)	−9.3 (15.3)	−18.7 (−1.7)	−20.0 (−4.0)
Average precipitation mm (inches)	57.0 (2.24)	52.6 (2.07)	52.4 (2.06)	45.2 (1.78)	75.7 (2.98)	70.2 (2.76)	77.2 (3.04)	62.0 (2.44)	54.8 (2.16)	66.5 (2.62)	64.4 (2.54)	72.0 (2.83)	750 (29.52)
Mean monthly sunshine hours	57.4	85.1	143.7	196.8	223.7	239.7	257.0	239.9	180.8	111.8	60.9	43.0	1,839.8
Source: Data derived from Deutscher Wetterdienst

Climate data for Pforzheim
Month	Jan	Feb	Mar	Apr	May	Jun	Jul	Aug	Sep	Oct	Nov	Dec	Year
Mean daily maximum °C (°F)	2.9 (37.2)	5 (41)	9.4 (48.9)	13.9 (57.0)	18.4 (65.1)	21.5 (70.7)	23.8 (74.8)	23.4 (74.1)	20 (68)	14.3 (57.7)	7.8 (46.0)	4 (39)	13.7 (56.6)
Mean daily minimum °C (°F)	−2.5 (27.5)	−1.6 (29.1)	0.8 (33.4)	4 (39)	8 (46)	11.3 (52.3)	13 (55)	12.7 (54.9)	9.6 (49.3)	5.8 (42.4)	1.5 (34.7)	−1.4 (29.5)	5.1 (41.1)
Average rainfall mm (inches)	53 (2.1)	49 (1.9)	50 (2.0)	60 (2.4)	81 (3.2)	94 (3.7)	74 (2.9)	78 (3.1)	57 (2.2)	54 (2.1)	60 (2.4)	60 (2.4)	770 (30.4)
Average snowfall cm (inches)	7.4 (2.9)	4.5 (1.8)	2.2 (0.9)	0.7 (0.3)	0.0 (0.0)	0.0 (0.0)	0.0 (0.0)	0.0 (0.0)	0.0 (0.0)	0.4 (0.2)	1.5 (0.6)	5.7 (2.2)	22.4 (8.9)
Average rainy days	11.9	9.7	13.2	12.8	18.3	16.6	15.7	14.8	10.5	11.7	10.9	14.3	160.4
Average snowy days	8.8	7.3	3.4	0.6	0	0	0	0	0	0.2	2.3	5.9	28.5
Mean monthly sunshine hours	58.9	87.6	133.3	171	217	228	254.2	232.5	183	127.1	72	55.8	1,820.4
Mean daily sunshine hours	1.9	3.1	4.3	5.7	7	7.6	8.2	7.5	6.1	4.1	2.4	1.8	5.0
Mean daily daylight hours	8.8	10.2	11.9	13.7	15.3	16.1	15.7	14.3	12.6	10.8	9.2	8.3	12.2
Source: Weather2visit, Weather Atlas

== History ==
It was settled by the Romans earlier than the current centers of Stuttgart and Karlsruhe were. These colonists constructed a ford through the river, shortly past the confluence of the three rivers, for their military highway. Due to this strategic location, Pforzheim later became a center for the timber-rafting trade, which transported timber from the Black Forest via the rivers Wuerm, Nagold, Enz and down the Neckar and Rhine to, among other markets, the Netherlands for use in shipbuilding. Their timbers were also used to construct the foundations for Amsterdam, which was built in a swamp.

Since 90: A settlement was established by Roman citizens at the Enz River near the modern Altstädter Brücke (old town bridge). Archeological surveys have unearthed several artifacts of that period which are kept and displayed in the Kappelhof Museum. The settlement was located where the Roman military road connecting the military camp Argentoratum (nowadays Strasbourg in France) and the military camp at Cannstatt (now a suburb of Stuttgart) at the Upper Germanic Limes border line of the Roman Empire crossed the Enz river.

This place was known as Portus (meaning "river crossing, harbor"), which is believed to be the origin of the first part of the city's name "Pforzheim". A Roman milestone (the so-called 'Leugenstein') from the year 245 was excavated in modern times at present-day Friolzheim; it is marked with the exact distance to 'Portus' and is the first documented evidence of the settlement.

259/260: The Roman settlement 'Portus' was destroyed completely, as the Frank and Alemanni tribes overran the Upper Germanic Limes border line of the Roman Empire and conquered the Roman administered area west of the Rhine River. From then on, over an extended period of time, historical records about the settlement were not available.

6th/7th century: Graves from this period indicate that the settlement had been continued.

1067: The settlement was mentioned as "Phorzheim" for the first time, in a document by Henry IV, Holy Roman Emperor. Visits to Pforzheim by Heinrich IV in 1067 and 1074 are documented.

Before 1080: The "old town" of Pforzheim was awarded market rights (Marktrecht). At that time Pforzheim belonged to the estate of Hirsau Monastery, according to monastery documents.

From 1150: Establishment of the "new town" west of the "old town" at the foot of the Schlossberg (palais hill) under Margrave Hermann V.

1200: The town charter of the "new town" was mentioned for the first time in a document. The "old town" continued to exist as a legally independent entity.

1220: The Margraves of Baden selected Pforzheim as their residence. This resulted in the "new town" becoming prominent.

1240: A mayor of Pforzheim was mentioned in a document for the first time.

13th/14th century: Pforzheim enjoyed its first period of flourishing. A group of influential patricians emerged. They developed the financial markets of those days. The town drew its income from the wood trade, timber rafting, the tannery trade, textile manufacturing, and other crafts. Documents mention mayor, judge, council and citizens.

The town walls surrounding the new town were completed about 1290. During this era, three Roman Catholic orders established their convents in town (the Franciscan order established their domicile within the town wall at present-day Barfuesserkirche (the choir of which remains), the Dominican sisters order established their domicile outside the walls of the old town near Auer Bridge, and the Prediger cloister was located east of the Schlossberg, probably inside the town walls). Outside the town wall and across the Enz river, the suburb Flösser Quarters (the home of the timber-floating trade) was established. Next to the western town wall, the suburb of Brötzingen gradually developed.

The Margraves of Baden considered Pforzheim as their most important power base up to the first half of the 14th century. Under Margrave Bernard I (Bernhard I), Pforzheim became one of the administrative centers of the margraviate.

1322: Holy Ghost Hospital was founded at Tränk Street (present-day Deimling Street).

=== 15th century ===
Various fraternities, also known as guilds, among people working in the same trade were established: The fraternity of tailors in 1410, the fraternity of bakers on 14 May 1422, the fraternity of the weavers in 1469, the fraternity of the wine-growers in 1491, the fraternity of the skippers and timber raftsmen in 1501, and the fraternity of the carters in 1512. Members of the same fraternity assisted each other in various ways, for example with funerals and in cases of sickness. In a sense, the fraternities were early forms of health and life insurance.

8–9 August 1418: Sigismund, Holy Roman Emperor visits Margrave Bernard I (Bernhard I) in Pforzheim. On this occasion the mint of the Margraves of Baden in Pforzheim was mentioned. Mint master was Jakob Broeglin between 1414 and 1431. The emperor appointed the master of the Pforzheim mint, Jakob Bröglin, and Bois von der Winterbach for five years as Royal Mint Masters of the mints of Frankfurt and Nördlingen. The Margrave was appointed as their patron.

1447: The wedding of Margrave Charles I (Karl I) of Baden with Catherine of Austria, the sister of Frederick III, Holy Roman Emperor (Friedrich III), was celebrated in Pforzheim with great pomp (including tournaments and dances).

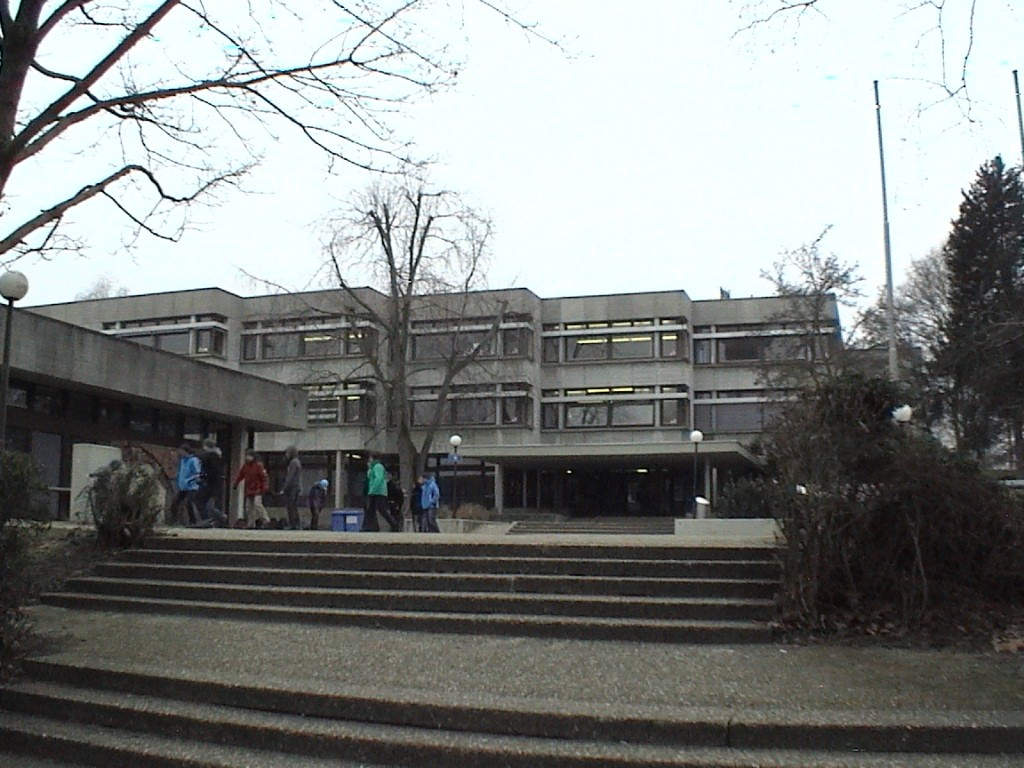
Reuchlin-Gymnasium (Reuchlin-Highschool) today near the water tower

1455: Johannes Reuchlin, the great German humanist, was born in Pforzheim on 29 January (he died in Stuttgart on 30 June 1522). He attended the Latin School section of the monastery school run by the Dominican order of Pforzheim in the late 1460s. Later, partly due to Reuchlin's efforts, the Latin School of Pforzheim developed into one of the most prominent schools in southwestern Germany, named Reuchlin-Gymnasium. The school's teachers and pupils played an outstanding role in the dissemination of the ideas of humanism and the protestant reformation movement. The most famous pupils included Reuchlin himself, Reuchlin's nephew Philipp Melanchthon, and Simon Grynaeus.

1460: Margrave Charles I established a kind of monastery (Kollegialstift) at the site of Schlosskirche St. Michael, turning the church into a collegiate church. There were also plans to establish a university in Pforzheim, but this plan had to be abandoned because Margrave Charles I lost the Battle of Seckenheim.

1463: Margrave Charles I was forced to transfer the palace and the town of Pforzheim as a fiefdom to the Elector Palatine after losing the Battle of Seckenheim. He then began to build a new palace in modern Baden-Baden. Christoph I, Margrave of Baden-Baden finally moved the residence of the margraves to Baden-Baden. This gradually ended the first period of Pforzheim's flourishment. The rich merchants gradually left the town, which declined to the status of a country town of mostly small traders.

1486: The Weavers Ordinance (Wollweberordnung) for the towns Pforzheim und Ettlingen was approved by Christoph I, Margrave of Baden-Baden. This was a contract concerning the town privileges of Pforzheim. This regulation of the weaving trade did not allow the formation of a regular guild (Zunft).

1491: A contract between Christoph I, Margrave of Baden-Baden and the citizens of Pforzheim was concluded, granting the town of Pforzheim several privileges concerning taxes and business.

1496: Foundation of the first printer's shop by Thomas Anshelm. During the first half of the 16th century Pforzheim's printers contributed significantly to the establishment of this (in those days) new medium.

=== 16th century ===
1501: Christoph I, Margrave of Baden-Baden enacted the "Ordinance on the timber rafting profession in Pforzheim". The single timber logs that were floated from the deeper Black Forest areas down the Enz, Nagold and Wuerm rivers were bound together in the Au area to form larger timber rafts. Those rafts were then floated down the lower Enz, Neckar and Rhine rivers. The timber rafting stations of Weissenstein, Dillstein and Pforzheim were well known in the profession.

1501 was also the year for which an outbreak of the plague (probably the bubonic plague) is recorded in the Swabian chronicle Annalium Suevicorum by Eberhard Karls University of Tübingen professor Martin Grusius, published 1596. It is not known how many of Pforzheim's citizens died in that year, but there are reports of 500 deceased in the close by city of Calw and about 4000 in Stuttgart, which accounted for approximately one quarter to one half of the populations of those towns. Outbreaks of the disease were reported for many places in southwestern Germany, Bohemia, the Alsace region in nowadays France, Switzerland, and Italy. Common graves with massive numbers of human bones at the cemetery of St. Michael Church and the cemetery on the estate of the Dominican order near nowadays Waisenhausplatz found during the last century may indicate that hundreds of citizens became the victims of the plague. There are indications that a fraternity for taking care of the sick and removing the bodies of the deceased from houses was formed in 1501, whose members later on stayed together and became known as the choral society Singergesellschaft, which is still active today as the Loebliche Singergesellschaft of 1501. (They are probably one of the oldest clubs in Europe).

1520s: The ideas of the protestant religious movement advanced by Martin Luther spread rapidly in Pforzheim. Its most prominent promoters were Johannes Schwebel, a preacher at Holy Ghost church (Heiliggeistkirche), and Johannes Unger, the principal of the Dominican Latin school.

1535–1565: Due to the heritage division of the clan of the Margraves of Baden, Margrave Ernst of Baden made Pforzheim the residential town of his family line. He decided to use the Schlosskirche St. Michael as the entombment site for his family line.

1549: A large fire caused severe damage to the town.

1556: After the conclusion of the Peace of Augsburg in 1555, Margrave Karl II introduced Lutheranism (Protestantism) as the state religion in the district Baden-Durlach, which included Pforzheim. The (Catholic) monasteries were gradually shut down.

1565: Margrave Karl II chose Durlach as the new residential town. Pforzheim stayed one of the administrative centers of Baden.

=== 17th century ===
1618: At the beginning of the Thirty Years' War, the number of inhabitants of Pforzheim is estimated to have been between 2500 and 3000. This was the largest town among all towns in Baden, even though at that time it had already declined somewhat.

A view of Pforzheim in the early 17th century. It shows all significant landmarks including the city wall, the rivers Enz and Nagold, the three monastery churches and the Margrave's residence on Schlossberg hill.

1645: Toward the end of the Thirty Years' War the "old town" was burned down by Bavarian (i.e. Catholic) troops. It was rebuilt, but without the former fortifications, which gave it the status of a village-like settlement. It soon vanished from historical records. The "new town" had survived.

1688–1697: The "War of the Palatinian Succession" (also called the Nine Years War) caused tremendous destruction in Southwestern Germany. The French "sun king" Louis XIV's efforts to expand the territory of France up to the Upper Rhine river and to put the Elector Palatine under pressure to severe its ties with the League of Augsburg included the Brûlez le Palatinat! tactics of destroying major towns on both sides of the Rhine river. These tactics seem to have been mainly the idea of the French war minister, François Michel le Tellier, Marquis de Louvois.

Pforzheim was occupied by French troops on 10 October 1688. Commanding officer is said to have been Joseph de Montclar. The town was forced to accommodate a large number of soldiers and had to pay a large amount of "contributions" to the French. When the army unit was about to depart early in the morning of 21 January 1689 (obviously because an army of the Holy Roman Empire had been approaching), they set many major buildings on fire, including the palais, the city hall, and vicarages. About 70 houses (i.e. one quarter of all houses) and part of the town's fortifications were reportedly destroyed.

Between 2 and 4 August, the French army under the general command of Marshal Jacques Henri de Durfort de Duras again crossed the Rhine river and began the destruction of major towns in Baden. On 10 August 1689, a French army unit under the command of General Ezéchiel du Mas, Comte de Mélac appeared in front of Pforzheims town gates, but this time the town refused to surrender. In response, the French army began shelling the town with cannons from the Rod hill located southwest of the town, and the several hundred soldiers of the German imperial command, who were defending the town, were forced to surrender. After a short period of looting, the French troops set the inner town area on fire on 15 August, which made that area uninhabitable for several weeks. Then the French moved on.

During the following two years, French troops stayed away from Pforzheim, but the economic situation of the town was miserable. In addition to this, the reconstruction of the town and the repairs of the fortifications under the supervision of Johann Matthaeus Faulhaber, the chief construction officer of the Margraviate Baden, required a lot of efforts. The accommodation of an imperial garrison under the command of (then) colonel Count Palffy also was a heavy burden.

In 1691, Louvois instructed his marshals to destroy those towns which were to serve as winter quarters for imperial troops, explicitly including Pforzheim, and then continue to Wuerttemberg for further destructions. After the French troops had crossed the Rhine river under the command of Marshal Guy Aldonce de Durfort de Lorges at Philippsburg on 3 August 1691, they assaulted the Margraves' residential town of Durlach and 1,200 cavalry men, 300 dragoons and 1,200 infantry men advanced toward Pforzheim where they arrived in the morning on 9 August and surrounded the town. When the approximately 200 imperial soldiers under the command of Captain Zickwolf and other men in the town refused to surrender, the siege began. After shelling the town during the day and the following night, the resistance of the town broke down and on 10 August in the morning the French forced the town gates open, occupied and looted it (although with little success, as there was not much left to be taken away). On 12 August, the French moved on, this time refraining from setting houses on fire. The fortification had again been damaged, though (the White Tower, the Auer Bridge Gate, the Upper Mill and the Nonnen Mill were burnt down). The French also stole all church bells, except for one minor one.

On 20 September 1692, again crossed the Rhine river under the general command of Marshal Guy Aldonce de Durfort de Lorges, and advanced toward Durlach and Pforzheim. On 24 September, 2,000 cavalry soldiers and 1,200 infantry and artillery troops under the command of Marshal Noël Bouton de Chamilly, moved to Pforzheim, where the town and 600 soldiers of the imperial German army in town surrendered without any military engagements. The rest of the French army arrived on 27 September under the command of Marshal de Lorges. On the same day, the French army moved on to Oetisheim near Mühlacker and attacked an imperial army unit of 4,000 cavalry men under the command of Duke Frederick Charles of Württemberg-Winnental in their camp. As they were taken by surprise, they withdrew hastily and lost several hundred men, either killed or captured by the French. (The Duke himself was among the French prisoners.) On 28 September, the French army returned to Pforzheim and established a camp. It was reported that the entire Enz valley between the village of Eutingen east of Pforzheim and the village of Birkenfeld west of Pforzheim was occupied by the 30,000 French soldiers' camps. From their base in Pforzheim, French army units obviously under the leadership of Marshal de Chamilly advanced along the river valleys of Nagold and Würm and looted and destroyed the villages and towns of Huchenfeld, Calw, Hirsau, Liebenzell and Zavelstein. They also destroyed Liebeneck castle about 10 kilometres from Pforzheim towering above the Würm valley, where part of the Pforzheim town archives were hidden. The archive was burned. Another part of the town archive as well as documents of Baden administrative office had been brought to Calw, where they went up in flames, too.

When the French troops left after about one week of occupation, they again looted Pforzheim and put it on fire. This time, all houses which had survived the two previous fires, were destroyed. In the Au suburb, only three houses survived. The Au bridge was heavily damaged. Only four houses survived in the Broetzingen suburb. The town church of St. Stephen and a large part of the Dominican monastery complex were also destroyed. The Castle Church (Schlosskirche) of St. Michael was heavily damaged, and the family tombs of the Margraves of Baden in the church were desecrated by the soldiers. The last remaining church bell and the churches' clockworks were stolen as well. The town wall was damaged again, including the town gates. After the week-long presence of 30,000 soldiers in a town of only a few thousand citizens, all food was gone, including the seeds saved for next spring's sowing season. Every tree and grapevine on the valley slopes had been used up as firewood. The French army reached their camp in Philippsburg on 5 October 1692.

=== 18th century ===
1718: Inauguration of the "institution for orphans, the mad, the sick, for discipline and work" in a building of the former Dominican order Convent by the Enz river. Fifty years later this institution was to become the incubator of Pforzheim's jewellery and watchmaking industries.

1715–1730: During this period, there was a prolonged dispute between Pforzheim's citizens and the Margrave of Baden concerning the privileges granted to the town in 1491, which the Margrave considered obsolete and therefore demanded significantly higher tax payments from Pforzheim citizens. The issue was taken all the way to the Imperial Court of Justice, where the town's motion was defeated.

1767: Establishment of a watch and jewellery factory in the orphanage. This led to Pforzheim's jewellery industries. Watchmaking was given up later on.

=== 19th century ===
1805–06: A typhus epidemic in Pforzheim caused many deaths, disrupting the town's economy.

1809: The Administrative District Pforzheim of Baden was split into a Municipal District Administration Pforzheim and two Rural Districts.

1813: The two Rural Districts were combined to form the Rural District Administration Pforzheim.

1819: Municipal District Pforzheim and Rural District Pforzheim are merged to form the Higher District Administration Pforzheim.

1836: Ferdinand Öchsle in Pforzheim invented a device for measuring the sugar content in freshly pressed grape juice for assessing the future quality of wine (Mostwaage). It is still in use in the winery business.

1861–62: Pforzheim was connected to the German railway network with the completion of a section of the Karlsruhe–Mühlacker line between Wilferdingen and Pforzheim.

1863: The railway section between Pforzheim and Mühlacker was completed, thus establishing railway traffic between the capital of Baden, Karlsruhe, and the capital of Württemberg, Stuttgart.

1864: The Higher District Administration Pforzheim was made the Regional Administration Pforzheim.

1868: The Enz Valley Railway between Pforzheim and Wildbad was completed.

1869: Establishment of the first workers' union in Pforzheim, the "Pforzheim Gold(-metal) Craftsmen's Union".

1874: The section of the Nagold Valley Railway between Pforzheim and Calw was completed.

1877: Inauguration of the Arts and Crafts School (Kunstgewerbeschule; now incorporated into Hochschule (University) Pforzheim).

1888: On 5 August 1888, Bertha Benz and her two sons arrived in her hometown of Pforzheim on the first long-distance automobile journey in a car manufactured by her husband Carl Benz. She had started her drive in Mannheim, which is located about 106 kilometres (66 miles) from Pforzheim. Two years earlier, Carl Benz test drove his Benz Patent-Motorwagen, considered the first practical gasoline-powered automobile, after he was granted a patent for this technology on 29 January 1886. For her trip back home from Pforzheim, Bertha Benz bought fuel in a pharmacy in Wiesloch. During the trip, she had to make repairs with a hairpin to open a blocked fuel line, and after returning home, suggested to her husband that another gear be provided in his automobile for climbing hills. To commemorate her journey, the Bertha Benz Memorial Route, from Mannheim via Heidelberg to Pforzheim and back, was officially approved as a European Route of Industrial Heritage in 2008.

1893: Inauguration of the Pforzheim Synagogue.

The company Wellendorff, a family-owned jewellery producing until now, is founded by Ernst Alexander Wellendorff. The enterprise sells many kinds of jewelry at the highest level worldwide.

=== 20th century ===
From 1900: Revival of the Pforzheim watchmaking industry.

1905: The western borough Brötzingen was incorporated into the administration Pforzheim.

1906: The 1. FC Pforzheim football club was defeated by VfB Leipzig with a score of 1–2 in the final game of the German football championship.

1907: Julius Epple founded Aristo, the watch brand, benefitting from the bull market for wristwatches in the 1920s.

1914–1918: Pforzheim was not a battlefield in World War I, but 1600 men from Pforzheim lost their lives as soldiers on the battlefields.

1920s: The Pforzheim watchmaking industry thrived due to the new popularity of wrist-watches.

1927: Stowa, another well-known German watch brand from Pforzheim, was founded by Walter Storz in Hornberg, moving the business to Pforzheim in 1935. Walter's son, Werner, eventually takes over the business.

From 1933: On 5 March 1933, Germany held a federal election. In Pforzheim, the NSDAP won an absolute majority with over 57% of votes. On 21 March 1933, the Potsdam Day celebration, which marked the reopening of the Reichstag with speeches from Paul von Hindenburg and Adolf Hitler, lead to a large rally and torchlit parade in Pforzheim, with around 30,000 people participating. On 1 April 1933, the Nazis initiated a national boycott of Jewish businesses, which was also carried out in Pforzheim. The liquidation sales of Jewish businesses were also boycotted. On 10 April 1933, the city council awarded Adolf Hitler and Paul von Hindenburg honorary citizenship of the city. It also renamed Panorama Avenue and Hachel Park (today's Hachelallee and Hachelanlage) as Adolf Hitler Avenue and Adolf Hitler Park (Adolf-Hitler-Allee and Adolf-Hitler-Anlagen). On 17 June 1933, Pforzheim also held a book burning on the market square attended by several thousand people, organized by the local chapter of the Hitler Youth and League of German Girls. By the end of 1933, 13% of Jewish residents had left the city.

Along with the installation of the Nazi government in Germany the local subsidiaries of all political parties, groups and organizations other than the NSDAP were gradually disbanded in town. Public life as well as individual affairs were increasingly affected by Nazi influences. Persecution of Jewish fellow citizens occurred in Pforzheim, too, with boycotts of Jewish shops and companies.

1938: Establishment of the municipal Jewellery Museum.

1938: On 9 November, the so-called Kristallnacht, the Pforzheim Synagogue (see WWW-site) of the Jewish community was so badly damaged by Nazi activists that it had to be demolished later on.

1939: Regional Administration Pforzheim (Bezirksamt) was converted to the Rural District Pforzheim (Landkreis) with Pforzheim city as its administrative site. However, the town itself became a district-less administrative body.

1940: On 22 October 1940, the Gestapo deported most of the German Jewish population of Baden, the Palatinate, and Saarland to the Gurs internment camp in Vichy France as part of the Wagner-Bürckel Operation (Wagner-Bürckel-Aktion). As part of this operation, 186 Pforzheim residents were deported under the authority of Robert Heinrich Wagner, the Gauleiter of Gau Baden. Some of these were later transported to concentration camps in the east. Of the Pforzheim Jews deported to Gurs, only 55 were confirmed to have survived the Holocaust.

==== World War II ====
In 1944, many factories were converted to produce weaponry such as anti-aircraft shells, fuses for bombs, and allegedly even parts for the V-1 and V-2 rockets.

On the evening of 23 February 1945, Pforzheim was bombed in one of the most devastating area bombardments of World War II. Carried out by the Royal Air Force, the air raid killed about one quarter of the town's population, over 17,000 people, and destroyed about 83% of the town's buildings. The mission order to bomb Pforzheim issued by RAF Bomber Command states as the intention of the raid on Pforzheim "to destroy built up area and associated industries and rail facilities". The bombardment was carried out as part of the British carpet bombing campaign. The town was put on the target list for bombardments in November 1944 because it was thought by the Allies to be producing precision instruments for use in the German war effort and as transport centre for the movement of German troops. (Note: Pforzheim is situated in a valley and also spread out across the adjacent hill slopes. On the northern slope there is a level, narrow plateau that is about 100 meters wide and about 2 kilometers in length. The railway facilities, including the main station and what used to be the freight loading facilities, are located on this plateau. This is the only level space that can possibly be used for railway facilities there. If the RAF would have been only aiming at destroying the railway facilities, a few aircraft would have sufficed to finish this job in a short time. There was no need to bomb an area that was wider than one kilometer (0.6 miles) and had a length of more than three kilometers (1.9 miles) using more than 360 Lancasters, as was the case in the big raid on 23 February. The existence and size of the plateau on the northern slope can be verified by examining any topographic map featuring the Pforzheim city area, and the map showing the destroyed city area. And besides that, the area bombardment obviously was not even effective in destroying the railway facilities, because less than one month after the big raid in mid-March the railway facilities were bombed again several times by the USAF, this time focussing mainly on the suspected military target, not civilian estates.)

There were also several minor raids in 1944 and 1945.

After the main attack, about 30,000 people had to be fed by makeshift public kitchens because their housing had been destroyed. Almost 90% of the buildings in the core city area had been destroyed. Many Pforzheim citizens were buried in mass graves at Pforzheim's main cemetery because they could not be identified. There are also many graves of complete families. Among the dead were several hundred foreigners who had been in Pforzheim as forced labor workers.

The inner-city districts were severely depopulated. According to the State Statistics Bureau (Statistisches Landesamt), in the Market Square area (Marktplatzviertel) in 1939 there were 4,112 registered inhabitants, in 1945 none (0). In the Old Town area (Altstadtviertel) in 1939 there were 5,109 inhabitants, in 1945 only three persons were still living there. In the Leopold Square area, in 1939 there were 4,416 inhabitants, in 1945 only 13. (Note: These figures are similar to Groh (2005), but must be from another source which is not recorded.)

The German Army Report of 24 February 1945 devoted only two lines to reporting the bombardment: "In the early evening hours of February 23, a forceful British attack was directed at Pforzheim." RAF Bomber Command later assessed the bombing raid as the one with "probably the greatest proportion (of destroyed built-up area) (of any target) in one raid during the war".

In early April, as the Allied forces and the French Army advanced toward Pforzheim, the local German military commander gave orders to destroy the electric power generating plant and those gas and water supply lines that were still working, but local residents succeeded in persuading the staff sergeant in charge of the operation to refrain from this action in the face of the imminent and seemingly inevitable surrender of the German military. Likewise, orders were issued for the destruction of those bridges that had remained unscathed (some of the bridges had been destroyed by the air strikes of 23 February, others damaged or destroyed earlier in the war). Only the Iron (Railway) Bridge in Weißenstein ward was saved by citizens who pulled off the fuse wiring from the explosive devices which had already been installed, and dropped it into Nagold river. On 8 April, French troops, including an armored vehicle unit, moved into Pforzheim from the northwest, and were able to occupy the area north of Enz river, but the area south of the Enz river was defended by a German infantry unit using artillery. Fighting was especially fierce in Broetzingen. The French army units (including an Algerian and Moroccan unit) suffered heavy losses; among the dead was the commander of the army unit, Capitaine Dorance. The advance of the French army came to a halt temporarily, but with the support of fighter-bomber aircraft and due to the bad condition of the defenders - which included many old men and young boys who had been drafted into the Volkssturm - the French troops took possession of the vast rubble field which once was the a residential town of the Baden Margraves on 18 April.

The three months of French occupation were reportedly marked by hostile attitudes on both the French army side and the Pforzheim population's side; incidents of rape and looting, mainly by Moroccan soldiers, were also reported. Au Bridge (Auerbruecke) and Wuerm Bridge received makeshift repairs by the French military. The US Army, which replaced the French troops on 8 July 1945, helped repair Goethe Bridge, Benckiser Bridge, Old Town Bridge (Altstädterbrücke) and Horse Bridge (Roßbrücke) in 1945 and the following year. The relationship between the population and the US military was reportedly more relaxed than had been the case with the French army.

==== Post-World War II ====
1945–1965: Pforzheim was gradually rebuilt, giving Pforzheim a quite modern look. In September 1951 the Northern Town Bridge (Nordstadtbrücke) was inaugurated (the ceremony was attended by then Federal President Prof. Dr. Theodor Heuss). Jahn Bridge followed in December 1951, Werder Bridge in May 1952, the rebuilt Goethe Bridge in October 1952, and the rebuilt Old Town Bridge was inaugurated in 1954.

1955: On the occasion of the 500th birthday anniversary of Johannes Reuchlin, the city of Pforzheim established the Reuchlin Prize and awarded it for the first time in the presence of then President of the Federal Republic of Germany (West-Germany), Prof. Dr. Theodor Heuss.

1961: Inauguration of the culture center "Reuchlinhaus", which from then on housed the Jewellery Museum, the Arts and Crafts Association, the City Library, the Homeland Museum (Heimatmuseum), and the City Archives.

1968: On 10 July 1968, Pforzheim and its surrounding areas were hit by the Black Forest tornado, a rare F4 storm considered one of the worst in Germany in the 20th century. With wind speeds between 333 and 418 kilometers per hour and a path of around 30 km, it destroyed more than 2,000 buildings in the city and caused damages of around 130 million DM. Two people died in Ottenhausen and more than 200 people were injured. Across the town between Büchenbronn and Wurmberg, the storm caused severe damage to forest areas. During the first night and the following days French 3rd Hussar Regiment and the US Army soldiers, stationed at the Buckenberg Barracks, helped clear the streets of fallen trees (especially in the Buckenberg/Haidach area). It took about four weeks to carry out the most necessary repairs to buildings. The overhead electric contact wires for the electric trolley buses then still operating in town and the streetcar to the village of Ittersbach were never repaired, and those transport systems were retired.

1971–1975: The townships of Würm, Hohenwart, Buechenbronn, Huchenfeld and Eutingen were incorporated into the city administration.

1973: On 7 July 1973, Pforzheim inaugurated its New City Hall (Neues Rathaus) to replace the building destroyed in the 1945 air raid. Constructed between 1968 and 1973 in the Brutalist style, it was designed by architect Rudolf Prenzel.

1973 As part of the reform of administrative districts, the rural district of Pforzheim was incorporated into the newly established Enz rural district, which has its administration in Pforzheim. But the city of Pforzheim itself remains a district-less city. In addition, Pforzheim became the administrative center of the newly formed Northern Black Forest Region.

1975 On 1 January, the population exceeded 100.000 and Pforzheim gained the status of a "large city" (Grossstadt).

1979: Inauguration of the Pforzheim City Museum.

1983: Inauguration of the "Technical Museum of the Jewellery and Watchmaking Industry" and the "Citizens Museum".

1987: Inauguration of the City Convention Center.

1987/1990: Inauguration of the City Theater at the Waisenhausplatz.

1989: Sister City agreement with the City of Gernika, Spain.

1990: Sister City agreement with the City of Saint-Maur-des-Fossés, France.

1991: Sister City agreement with the City of Vicenza, Italy.

1992: State Gardening Expo in Pforzheim. Enzauenpark was created and part of the Enz river was re-naturalized.

1994: Inauguration of the cultural institution "Kulturhaus Osterfeld".

1994: Merger of the Pforzheim Business School and the Pforzheim School of Design to form the Pforzheim University of Applied Sciences in Design, Technology and Business.

1995: Inauguration of the Archeological Site Kappelhof.

=== 21st century ===
2000: Inauguration of the Pforzheim Gallery.

2002: In November, during excavation works for a new shopping center in the center of the city, a power shovel hit a 250 kg (551 lb) bomb that had not detonated during the bombardment of 1945. On a Sunday, about 5000 citizens temporarily left their homes as a precaution while specialists defused and disposed of the latest of a large number of unexploded bombs found in Pforzheim's grounds since 1945.

2006: The Timex Group introduced a line of high-end watches engineered in Pforzheim over a five-year period, to six sigma standards. The technology used miniaturization with digital sensors and microprocessors driving independent motors and dial hands — to enable a range of specialized complications atypical to non-digital, analog watches — an array of functions that would either be impossible or highly impractical in a mechanical movement.

== Demographics ==
=== Administrative unions ===
Formerly independent communities and districts which were incorporated into the City of Pforzheim.

Administrative unions of Pforzheim
Date incorporated	Community	Increase in km^{2}	Increase in sq mi
1 January 1905	Brötzingen	13.01	5.02
1 January 1913	Dillweißenstein	4.612	1.781
1 April 1924	Parts of Haidach district	0.76	0.29
1 October 1929	Parts of Hagenschieß district	16.23	6.27
1 September 1971	Würm	8.22	3.17
1 April 1972	Hohenwart	4.92	1.90
1 January 1974	Büchenbronn	11.14	4.30
1 January 1975	Huchenfeld	9.47	3.66
20 September 1975	Eutingen an der Enz	8.45	3.26

=== Population ===
The table below shows the number of inhabitants for the past 500 years. Until 1789 the numbers represent estimates, after that they represent census results or official recordings by the Statistics Offices or the city administration.

Historical population

Year	Pop.	±% p.a.
1500	800	—
1689	1,000	+0.12%
1789	4,311	+1.47%
1810	5,572	+1.23%
1830	6,284	+0.60%
1849	10,711	+2.85%
1855	12,377	+2.44%
1871	19,803	+2.98%
1890	29,988	+2.21%
1900	43,373	+3.76%
1910	69,082	+4.76%
1925	78,859	+0.89%
1933	79,816	+0.15%
1939	79,011	−0.17%

Year	Pop.	±% p.a.
1946	46,752	−7.22%
1950	54,143	+3.74%
1961	82,524	+3.91%
1970	90,338	+1.01%
1975	108,635	+3.76%
1980	106,500	−0.40%
1985	104,100	−0.45%
1987	106,530	+1.16%
1990	112,944	+1.97%
1997	118,300	+0.66%
2000	117,156	−0.32%
2003	115,777	−0.39%
2020	126,016	+0.50%

The population growth diagram show that the largest growth rates were recorded between about 1830 and 1925, which was the period following the political reorganisation of Europe agreed upon at the Vienna Congress of 1815 after the violent period that was so much dominated by Napoleon Bonaparte of France. This high population growth period coincided with the period of intensive industrialisation of Germany. Population growth weakened due to the effects of World War I and World War II. The population declined sharply due to the destruction on 23 February 1945, and increased sharply in the post-World War II era due to high economic growth levels in West-Germany and the rapid rebuilding efforts in Pforzheim. Earlier setbacks were recorded during the Thirty Years' War period in the 17th century.

=== Immigration ===
Pforzheim has the largest percent of foreign nationals in Baden-Württemberg (31.2% as of November 2023). 60.4% of the population has a migration background (as of 2024), which is the second highest percentage in Germany. The largest groups of foreigners, in that order, are from Romania, Turkey, Italy, Iraq, Croatia, Ukraine, Hungary, Syria, Poland, and Bulgaria (as of 2023).

The table below lists the largest immigrant groups of Pforzheim as of 31 December 2018.

Largest immigrant groups by nationality
Turkey	4,952
Romania	4,129
Italy	3,939
Iraq	3,653
Croatia	2,173
Hungary	1,735
Poland	1,392
Syria	1,062
Portugal	993
Bulgaria	895
Kosovo	845
Serbia	754
Russia	710
Greece	691
Slovakia	397
Spain	332
North Macedonia	322
Ukraine	278
France	242
Vietnam	212

=== Religions ===
After margrave Karl II of Baden in 1556 installed the Protestant Reformation in the Margraviate of Baden, of which Pforzheim was the capital in those days, Pforzheim continued to be a Protestant town for several centuries. The congregations in Pforzheim were affiliated with the deanery (Dekanat) of Pforzheim of the Protestant National Church of Baden, unless they were members of one of the independent churches (Freikirche).

Since the 19th century at the latest Catholics settled in Pforzheim again. They are affiliated with the deanery of Pforzheim, which belongs to the Archdiocese of Freiburg.

Other denominations and religious sects in Pforzheim are:

- Israelite Congregation
- Islamic Congregation
- Adventist Congregation
- Jehovah's Witnesses
- Baptist Church
- Salvation Army
- Methodist Church
- Church of Christ, Scientist

== Politics ==
=== City council ===
The city council of Pforzheim consists of the Oberbürgermeister (mayor) as its president and 40 elected (part-time) councillors. It is elected by the citizens for a period of five years. The last election was on 9 June 2024. The city council is the main representative body of the city and determines the goals and frameworks for all local political activities. It makes decisions about all important issues regarding the public life and administration of the city and directs and monitors the work of the city administration. It forms expert committees in order to deal with specialized issues.

=== Lord mayors ===
At an early stage, the town administration was led by the mayor (Schultheiss) who used to be appointed by the lord (owner) of the town. Later on, there was a council with a mayor leading it, who since 1849 holds the title "Oberbürgermeister". The terms of office of the mayors until 1750 are unknown. Only the names of the mayors are mentioned in historical documents.

Lord mayors of Pforzheim
Start	End	Year(s)	Mayor
1750	1758	7–8	Ernst Matthaeus Kummer
1758	1770	11–12	W.C. Steinhaeuser
1770	1775	4–5	Weiss
1775	1783	7–8	Kissling
1783	1795	11–12	Guenzel
1795	1798	2–3	Geiger
1798	1815	16–17	Jakob Friedrich Dreher
1815	1830	14–15	Christoph Friedrich Krenkel
1830	1837	6–7	Wilhelm Lenz
1837	1848	10–11	Rudolf Deimling
1848	1849	0–1	Christian Crecelius
1849	1862	12–13	Karl Zirenner
1862	1875	12–13	Kaspar Schmidt
1875	1884	8–9	Karl Gross
1885	1889	3–4	Emil Kraatz
1889	1919	29–30	Ferdinand Habermehl
1920	1933	12–13	Erwin Guendert
1933	1933	0	Dr. Emil Goelser
1933	1933	0	Dr. Hans Gottlob
1933	1941	7–8	Hermann Kuerz
1941	1942	0–1	Karl Mohrenstein
1942	1945	2–3	Ludwig Seibel
1945	1945	0	Albert Hermann
1945	1945	0	Wilhelm Becker
1945	1947	1–2	Friedrich Adolf Katz
1947	1966	18–19	Dr. Johann Peter Brandenburg, FDP/DVP
1966	1985	18–19	Dr. Willi Weigelt, SPD
1985	2001	15–16	Dr. Joachim Becker, SPD
2001	2009	7–8	Christel Augenstein, FDP/DVP
2009	2017	7–8	Gert Hager, SPD
2017	present	8–9	Peter Boch, CDU

=== The coat of arms ===
Coat of arms of Pforzheim

The coat of arms of Pforzheim city shows in the left-hand half of a shield an inclined bar in red color on a golden background, and the right-hand half is divided into four fields in the colors red, silver, blue and gold. The city flag is white-blue.

The inclined bar can be traced back to the 13th century as the symbol of the lords (owners) of Pforzheim, which later on also became the National Coat of Arms of Baden, but its meaning is unknown. Since 1489 the coat of arms in its entire form can be verified, but its meaning is not known, either. Current coloring has been used only since 1853; in earlier times the coloring was different.

== Economy and infrastructure ==
Pforzheim is one of the regional centers (Oberzentrum) in Baden-Württemberg and has one of the highest densities of industrial activity in the state.

Pforzheim is historically an important jewelry and watch-making centre in Germany. Due to this reason, Pforzheim is nicknamed as Golden City. Jewelry and watch-making industry is first set up by Jean François Autran after receiving an edict from then overlord Margrave Karl Friedrich von Baden. This enterprise is later joined by other commercial enterprises and helped Pforzheim to become an important manufacturing city. Pforzheim accounts for just under 70 percent of the total sales of the German jewelry and silverware industry and around 80 percent of all the pieces of jewelry exported by Germany come from Pforzheim.

However, a smaller fraction of the economy nowadays is dedicated to producing the traditional products of watches and jewellery. Only 11,000 people are employed in the jewelry and watch-making industries. Two thirds of all employment positions are made available in the areas of metal processing, dental industry electronics and electro-technology. The mail order companies (Bader, Klingel, Wenz) with their sales volumes in the order of millions of Euros occupies a leading position in Germany. Tourism is gaining importance. In this respect the city benefits from its favorable Three-Valleys location at the gateway to the Black Forest, and related to this, from the starting points of a large number of hiking, cycling and waterway routes. The European long-distance trail E1 passes through Pforzheim. It is also the starting point of the Black Forest hiking routes Westweg, Mittelweg and Ostweg.

=== Transport ===
Pforzheim is located on the Karlsruhe–Mühlacker line, part of the legacy railway between Karlsruhe and Stuttgart. Pforzheim Hauptbahnhof, the central station, is a junction station, as two Black Forest branch lines start here: the Enz Valley Railway to Bad Wildbad, and the Nagold Valley Railway to Calw, Nagold and Horb. Since the 1990s, the Karlsruhe tram-train system has been extended to Pforzheim: since 2019, the local service to Karlsruhe is the S5 tram-train continuing into Karlsruhe city centre and Wörth am Rhein. In addition, tram-train S6 links Pforzheim via the Enz Valley Railway with the town centre of Bad Wildbad. In addition to tram-trains, regional trains operated by Arverio Baden-Württemberg and DB Regio Baden-Württemberg offer connections to Karlsruhe, Mühlacker, Bietigheim-Bissingen and Stuttgart (routes IRE1 and MEX17a), as well as to Tübingen via Calw (RB73). Also, some Intercity trains operated by Deutsche Bahn serve Pforzheim on its Karlsruhe-Stuttgart-Nuremberg route.

Local bus service in Pforzheim is currently franchised to DB Südwestbus, operating 13 urban bus routes. In addition, there are regional bus services to surrounding places.

The nearest airports are Stuttgart Airport, located 49 km (30 mi) south east and Karlsruhe/Baden-Baden Airport, located 62 km (39 mi) north west of Pforzheim.

All regional trains, tram-trains and buses within Pforzheim and the surrounding Enzkreis are marketed under the brand of the Verkehrsverbund Pforzheim-Enzkreis (VPE), offering mutually integrated fares.

Between 1900 and 1968 a metre-gauge light railway existed between Pforzheim and Ittersbach, connected there to the still existing Busenbach–Ittersbach railway.

The A8 Autobahn (Perl–Bad Reichenhall) runs by just to the north of the city. The city can be accessed via four A8 exits. In addition, the B10 (Lebach–Augsburg) and B294 (Gundelfingen–Bretten) and B463 (Pforzheim–Nagold) run through the city.

=== Major local enterprises ===
- Wellendorff Gold-Creationen GmbH & Co. KG, worldwide selling, family-owned jewellery since 1893
- Victor Mayer GmbH & Co. KG, Workmaster of Fabergé
- Amazon, logistics centre
- Durowe, watch movement manufacturer
- Schmid Machine Tools
- Klingel Mail Order Company
- Bader Mail Order Company
- Witzenmann GmbH (Specialized Metal Goods)
- Mapal WWS
- Allgemeine Gold- und Silberscheideanstalt (metal processing)
- Sparkasse Pforzheim Calw (Local financial services company)
- Bernhard Forster GmbH (Forestadent) (Orthodontic Products Manufacturer)

=== Media ===
The daily newspapers Pforzheimer Zeitung (independent) and the Pforzheimer Kurier, which is a regional edition of Badische Neueste Nachrichten (BNN) with main editorial offices in Karlsruhe, are published in Pforzheim.

=== Courts of Justice ===
Pforzheim is the site of a Local Court of Justice, which belongs to the District Court and Higher District Court Precinct of Karlsruhe. It is also the domicile of a local labor court.

=== Authorities ===
Pforzheim is the domicile of the following public authorities and public incorporated bodies:

- Pforzheim Employment Exchange (a federal government agency; Arbeitsagentur Pforzheim).
- Pforzheim Internal Revenue Agency (a state agency; Finanzamt Pforzheim)
- Northern Black Forest Chamber of Commerce (a public incorporated body; IHK Nordschwarzwald). The precinct of the chamber is the Northern Black Forest Region.
- Northern Black Forest Regional Association (a public incorporated body; Regionalverband Nordschwarzwald).

=== Educational institutions ===
- Pforzheim University of Applied Sciences (Hochschule Pforzheim – Hochschule fuer Gestaltung, Technik und Wirtschaft) enrolls about 5400 students. It was formed in 1992 by way of merging the former Pforzheim School of Design (Fachhochschule für Gestaltung) and Pforzheim Business School (Fachhochschule für Wirtschaft) and additionally establishing the Faculty of Engineering. The Pforzheim School of Design had its roots in the Ducal Academy of Arts and Crafts and Technical School for the Metal Processing Industry, established 1877. The Pforzheim Business School was the successor institution of the National Business College, which was established in 1963. The campuses of the Faculty of Design and the Faculties of Economics and Engineering are located at separate sites in the city area. The Pforzheim University of Applied Sciences fosters international exchange. Among other relationships, it is affiliated with the NIEBES Association and has close academic ties to Osijek University of Croatia and academic exchange programs with many institutions abroad, among them Auburn University, the University of Wyoming, Brigham Young University and the Illinois Institute of Technology, in Chicago, of the United States of America.
- The Goldsmith and Watchmaking Vocational School is one of the two schools of its kind in Europe. It is attended by many students from abroad.
- The general qualification for university admission (Abitur) can be obtained through an education at the Reuchlin-Highschool, the Kepler-Highschool, the Hebel-Highschool, the Theodor-Heuss-Highschool, the Hilda-Highschool, the Schiller-Highschool, the Fritz-Erler-Highschool (economics-oriented high school), the Heinrich-Wieland-Highschool (technology-oriented high school), the Johanna-Wittum-Highschool (home economics-oriented high school), as well as the Waldorfschule.
- Pforzheim also has many schools providing the mandatory general elementary and secondary education (Grundschule, Realschule) as well an institution which is dedicated to further education of grown-ups (Volkshochschule). There are also several state-run vocational schools leading to professional diplomas in the crafts and trades.

== Culture and places of interest ==
=== Theatre ===
- Municipal Theatre of Pforzheim (opera, operetta, dance, musical, drama)

=== Orchestras ===
- Pforzheim Chamber Orchestra – This orchestra was founded by Friedrich Tilegant in 1950
- Symphony Orchestra of the City of Pforzheim

=== Museums ===
- Archeological Site Kappelhof – Roman and medieval excavation objects
- Civic Museum Eutingen
- Museum on the German Democratic Republic (former east Germany)
- The Center of Fellow-Countrymen Associations (Landsmannschaften; especially those from eastern Europe)
- The Pforzheim Minerals Museum
- The Pforzheim Gallery (paintings)
- Reuchlinhaus
- The Pforzheim Jewellery Museum in the Reuchlinhaus
- The Pforzheim City Museum Pforzheim (on city history)
- The Technical Museum of the Jewellery and Watchmaking Industry of Pforzheim
- Weissenstein Station – On Railway History in the area of Pforzheim
- Roman Estate in the Kanzlerwald (the excavated remains of an estate built by Roman settlers)
- The Product Exhibition of Pforzheim (jewellery) Companies (Industriehaus)
- The Exhibition of Precious Stones by Widow Mrs. Schuett

=== Cultural institutions ===
- The House of Culture Osterfeld (a sociocultural center: theater, music, dance, cabaret, musical, arts, exhibitions etc.)
- Kupferdaechle (The Copper Roof Teenage Culture Center)
- The Puppet Theater of Raphael Muerle / The Marionette Stage Mottenkaefig
- The Communal Cinema of Pforzheim
- CongressCenter Pforzheim (CCP)
- City Library

=== Notable examples of architecture ===
==== Pre-war ====
- The Archive Building (Archivbau)
- The House of Industry (Industriehaus)
- The Arch Bridge at Dillweißenstein
- The ruins of Liebeneck Castle
- District office tower (Bezirksamtsturm)
- Leitgastturm
- Seehaus (formerly a hunting villa of the Margrave; now a popular destination for Sunday afternoon walks away from the city)
- The Old Grapes Press of Brötzingen
- Hachel Tower
- The Copper Hammer (Kupferhammer; a traditional water-powered sledge hammer which was used for metal forming)

==== Post-war ====
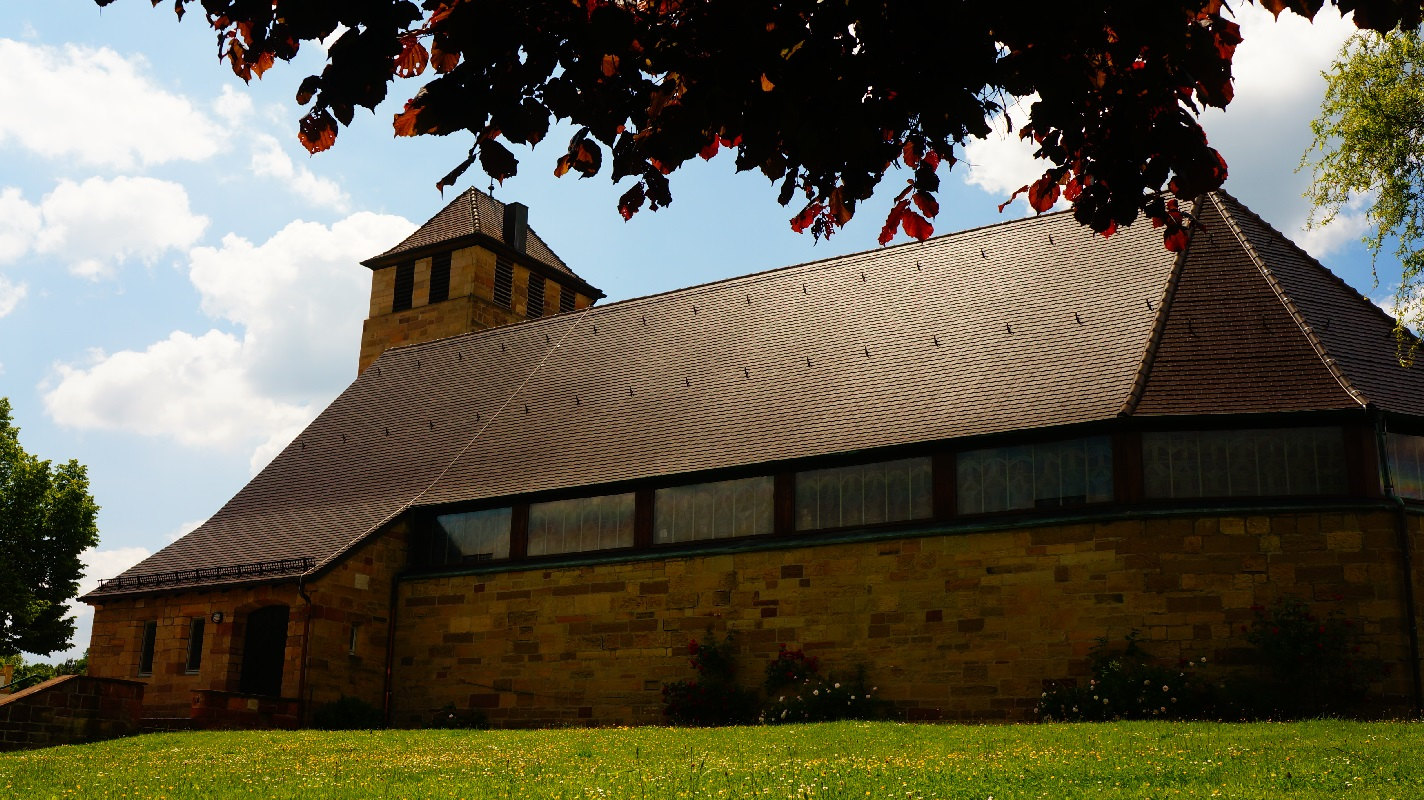
Resurrection Church (Auferstehungskirche)

- The Main Railway Station
- The former main post office and Brötzingen post office
- Reuchlinhaus
- Goldener Adler Building at Leopoldplatz
- former Public Health Authority building (Gesundheitsamt) at Blumenhof
- District Court Building
- The Old and New City Hall
- Stadtbau Building (Architect: Luigi Snozzi)
- Sparkasse Tower
- Churches:
  - The Palais and Monastery Church St. Michael (Schloss- und Stiftskirche); it is the city's landmark.
  - The Old Town Church St. Martin (Altstadtkirche; Protestant)
  - Resurrection Church (Auferstehungskirche; Protestant)
  - The Bare Feet Church (Barfüsserkirche; Catholic)
  - Christ Church of Brötzingen (Protestant)
  - The Protestant City Church (Stadtkirche)
  - Sacred Heart Church (Herz-Jesu-Kirche; Catholic)
  - St. Matthew Church (Matthäuskirche; Protestant). This church was designed by architect Eiermann and is a precursory structure of the famous New Berlin Memorial Church (Gedächtniskirche)
  - St. Francis Church (Catholic)
- Other Temples
  - The Islamic Mosque
  - The notable New Synagogue (1890) was lost on Kristallnacht

=== Other sites of interest ===
- The Alpengarten Pforzheim, closed since 2006
- The Main Cemetery (Hauptfriedhof)
- Wallberg. The debris from the destroyed town (23 February 1945) was dumped onto this hill. The Wallberg-Monument on the top is meant to remind people of the city's history; it was erected in 2005 on the occasion of the 60th anniversary of the bombing raid.
- The Game Animals Zoo (Wildpark Pforzheim)
- Brötzingen Valley Stadium. This is the classical soccer stadium of the 1. FC Pforzheim soccer club of 1896, which was inaugurated in 1913. It accommodated a record number of "15.000 to 20.000" spectators on the occasion of the match between South Germany against Central Hungary in 1920. In the post-Second-World-War era it accommodated 12.000 spectators at the cup matches 1. FC Pforzheim – 1. FC Nürnberg (score 2–1 after extra time; 1961) and 1. FCP – Werder Bremen (score 1–1 after extension; 1988). The soccer club (simply called the "club"), which during its history supplied the first national team captain and a total of eleven first league players, had to file for bankruptcy in February 2004 and for the first time in history is playing in the fifth league, i.e. the Soccer Association's Northern Baden League, during the 2004–05 season. In 1906, the club lost the final of the German Football Championship against VfB Leipzig 1–2 in Nuremberg.
- The Weststadtpark in the borough Maihälden, an extensive park area

== Twin towns and sister cities ==
Pforzheim is twinned with:

- Gernika-Lumo, Spain (1989)
- Saint-Maur-des-Fossés, France (1989)
- Vicenza, Italy (1991)
- Irkutsk, Russia (2007)
- Nevşehir, Turkey (2007)
- Częstochowa, Poland (2007)
- Osijek, Croatia (2008)
- Alsónémedi, Hungary (2026)

== Notable people ==
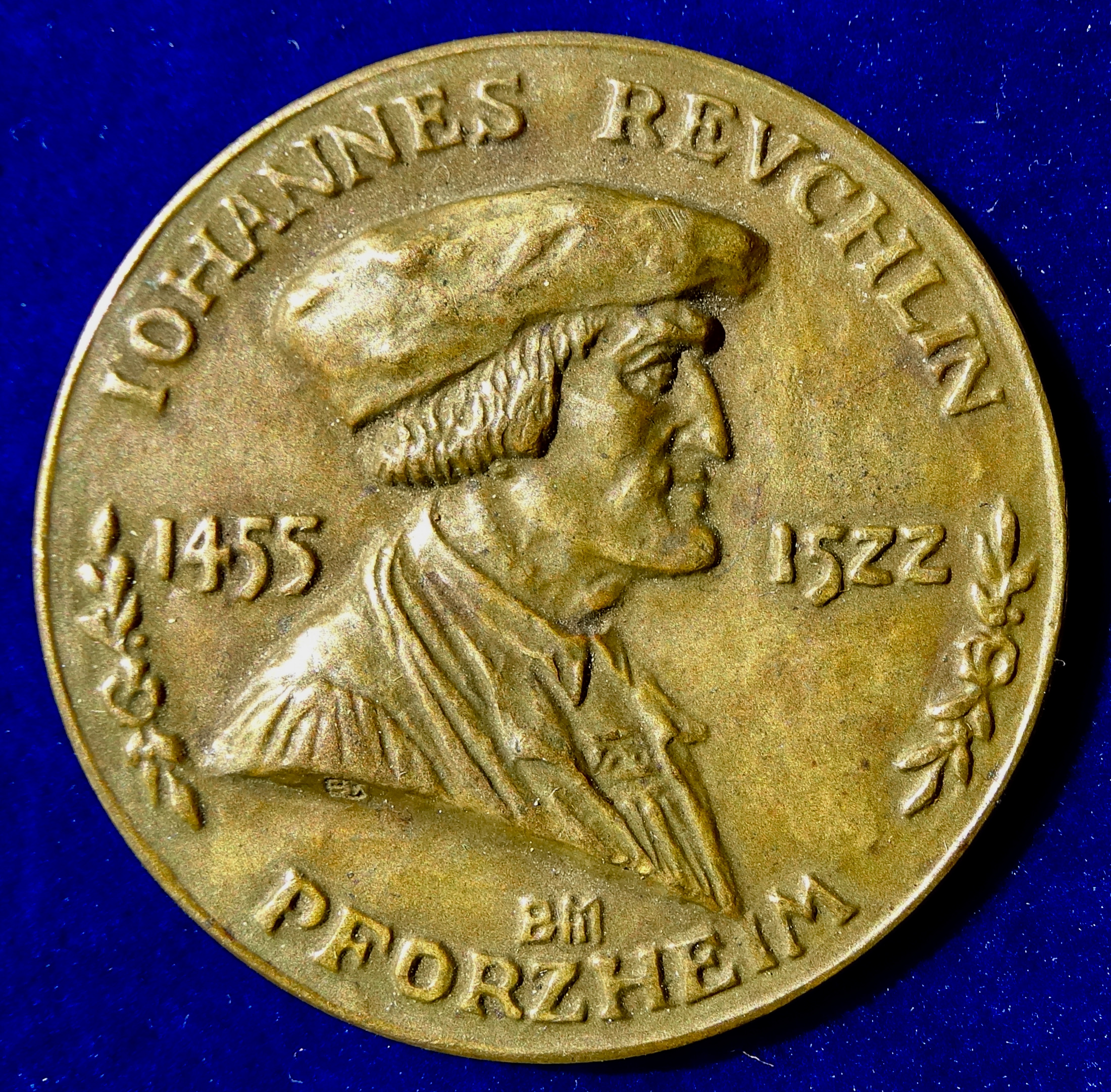
Johannes Reuchlin 400th Anniversary Medal, 1922

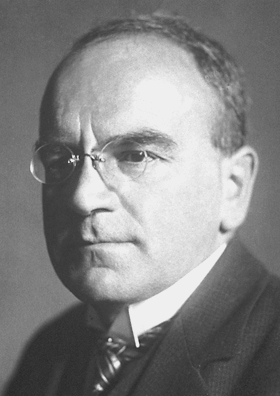
Heinrich Otto Wieland, 1927

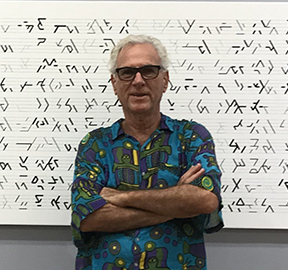
Manfred Mohr, 2019

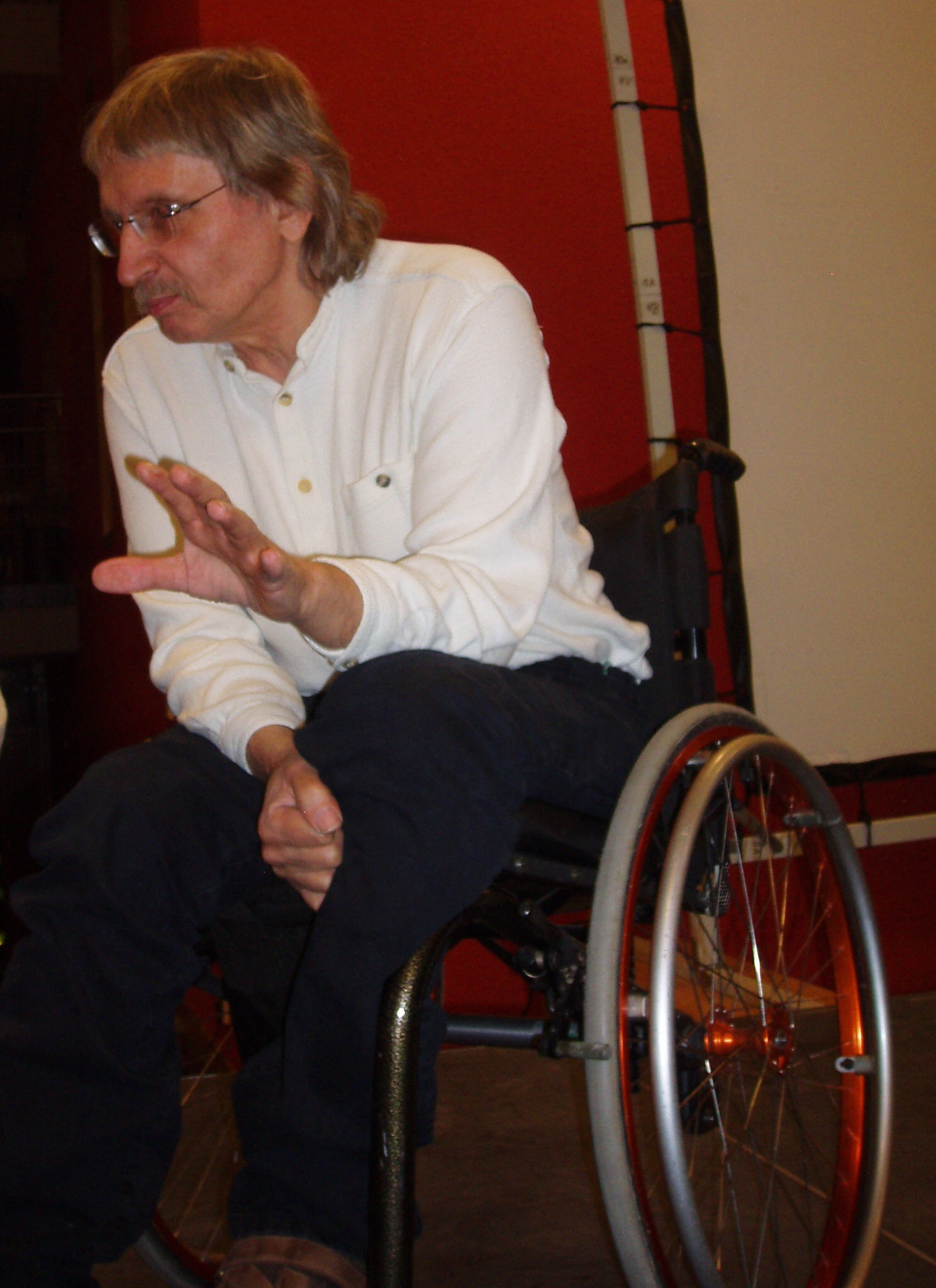
Jochen Hasenmayer, 2009

- Jakob Bänsch (born 2003), jazz musician
- Johannes Reuchlin (1455–1522), humanist and philosopher.
- Ernest, Margrave of Baden-Durlach (1482–1553), the ruling Margrave of Baden-Pforzheim from 1533
- Nikolaus Gerbel (1485–1560), humanist and jurist
- Charles II, Margrave of Baden-Durlach (1529–1577), governed Baden-Durlach from 1552 to 1577.
- Philipp Jakob Becker (1763–1829), painter
- Christopher Bechtler (1782–1843), goldsmith and watchmaker
- Karl Heinrich Baumgaertner (1798–1886), physician and pathologist
- Christian Friedrich Wilhelm Roller (1802–1878), psychiatrist
- Bertha Benz (1849–1944), wife of automotive engineer Carl Benz
- Victor Mayer (1857–1946), jewellery manufacturer
- Guillermo Kahlo (1871–1941), photographer. father of painter Frida Kahlo
- Heinrich Otto Wieland (1877–1957), chemist, won the 1927 Nobel Prize in Chemistry
- Erich Rothacker (1888–1965), sociologist and exponent of philosophical anthropology.
- Emil Georg Bührle (1890–1956), Swiss industrialist and armament manufacturer
- Fritz Todt (1891–1942), engineer and head of Organisation Todt
- Hans Ferdinand Mayer (1895–1980), physicist and electrical engineer
- Karl Abt (1899–1985), painter of naturalistic landscapes and flowers
- Adolf Rosenberger (1900–1967), race car driver and co-founder of Porsche
- Fritz Dietrich (1905–1945), musicologist and composer
- Hans Henninger (1905–1937), stage and film actor
- Laura Perls (1905–1990), psychoanalyst
- Gottlob Frick (1906–1994), opera bass known for singing Mozart and Wagner.
- Herbert Witzenmann (1905–1988), writer and researcher
- W. Carl Burger (1925–2023), American abstract expressionist painter.
- Fritz Rau (1930–2013), music promoter and concert manager
- Werner Tochtermann (1934–2021), chemist and university lecturer
- Manfred Mohr (born 1938), artist, pioneer of the digital art
- Jochen Hasenmayer (born 1941), speleologist and cave diver
- Wolfgang Heinz (born 1942), criminologist and legal scientist
- Dieter Kosslick (born 1948), director of the Berlinale Film Festival
- Peter Bofinger (born 1954), economist and a former member of the German Council of Economic Experts
- Tomas Maier (born 1957), fashion designer
- Jürgen Elsässer (born 1957), journalist and political activist
- Marcus Prinz von Anhalt (born 1966), businessman, nightclub and brothel owner
- Stefan Mappus (born 1966), economist and politician (CDU)
- Florian Ross (born 1972), composer, jazz pianist and bandleader
- Jeff S. Klotz (born 1990), author, publisher, museum director and entrepreneur
- Felix Herkens (born 1995), politician

=== Sport ===
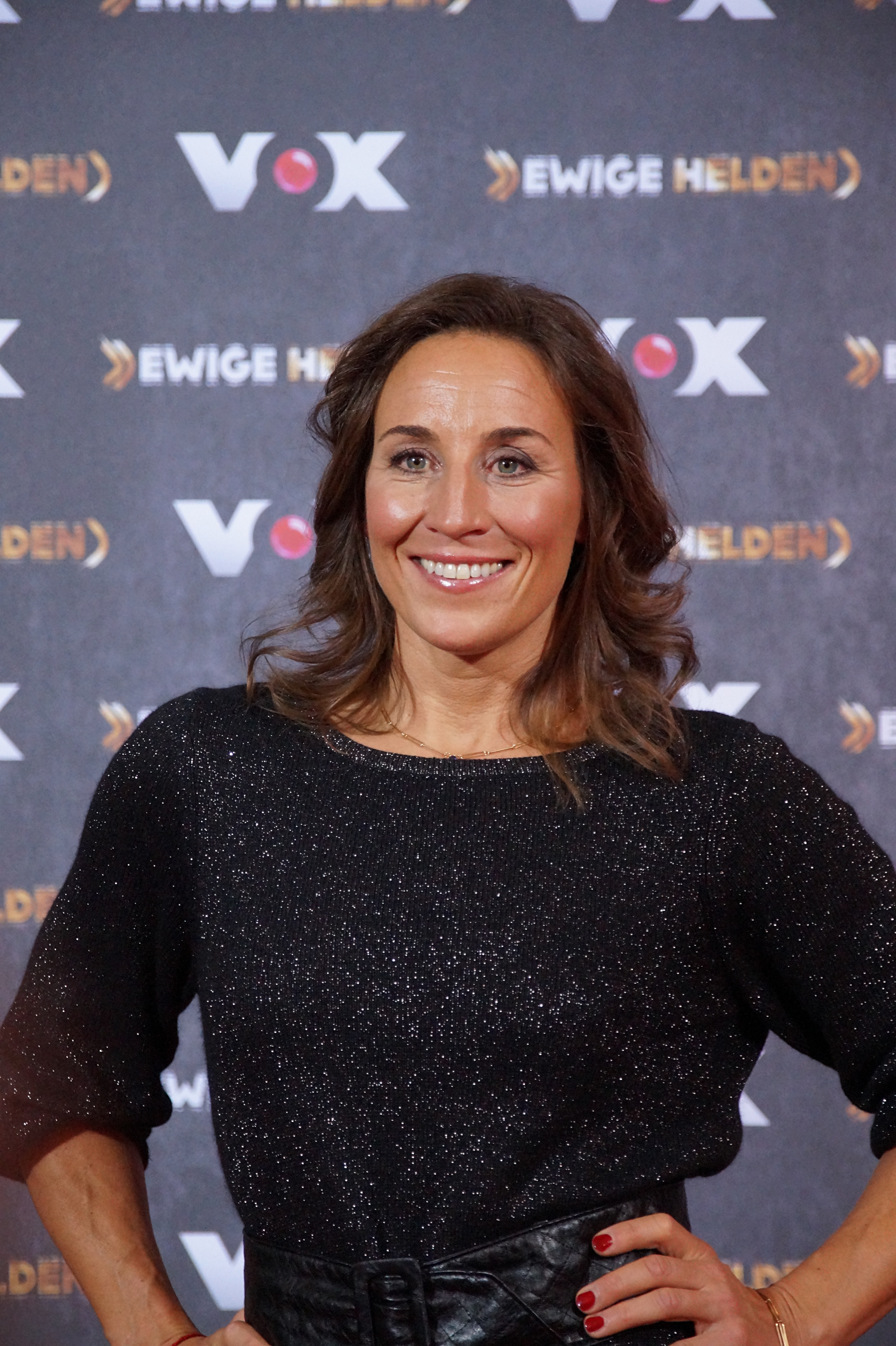
Nicola Thost, 2015

- Robert Faas (1889–1914), footballer
- Marius Hiller (1892–1964), footballer
- Hellmut Maneval (1898–1967), footballer
- Theodor Burkhardt (1905–1958), footballer
- Leah Horowitz (1933–1956), Israeli hurdler
- Bernd Klotz (born 1958), football coach and a former player who played over 230 games
- Marcello Craca (born 1974), German-Italian tennis player
- Nicola Thost (born 1977), snowboarder and gold medallist at the 1998 Winter Olympics
- Marcel Rapp (born 1979), former footballer who played 381 games
- Stephan Loboué (born 1981), football goalkeeper who has played over 240 games
- Sascha Boller (born 1984), footballer who has played over 230 games
- Denis Thomalla (born 1992), footballer who played over 320 games
- Matthias Zimmermann (born 1992), footballer who has played over 380 games
- Vincenzo Grifo (born 1993), footballer, played over 340 games
- Julian Günther-Schmidt (born 1994), footballer who has played over 300 games
- Robert Bauer (born 1995), footballer, played over 200 games
- Robin Hack (born 1998), footballer, played over 170 games

=== Honorary citizens ===
- 1939 * Alfons Kern, (DE Wiki), (1859–1941), historian and city architect
- 1965 * Johann Peter Brandenburg, (DE Wiki), (1905–1977) politician (FDP/DVP), Member of State Parliament, Lord Mayor of Pforzheim
- 1985 * Willi Weigelt (1920–2002), politician (SPD), Lord Mayor of Pforzheim
- 1991 * Richard Ziegler, (DE Wiki) (1891–1992), painter
- 1998 * Rolf Schweizer (1936–2016), composer, choirmaster and church music director

== Miscellaneous topics ==
- The Freemasons Lodge "Reuchlin" is located in Pforzheim.
- Fool's Garden, an internationally successful rock band, has its origins in Pforzheim.

== Gallery ==
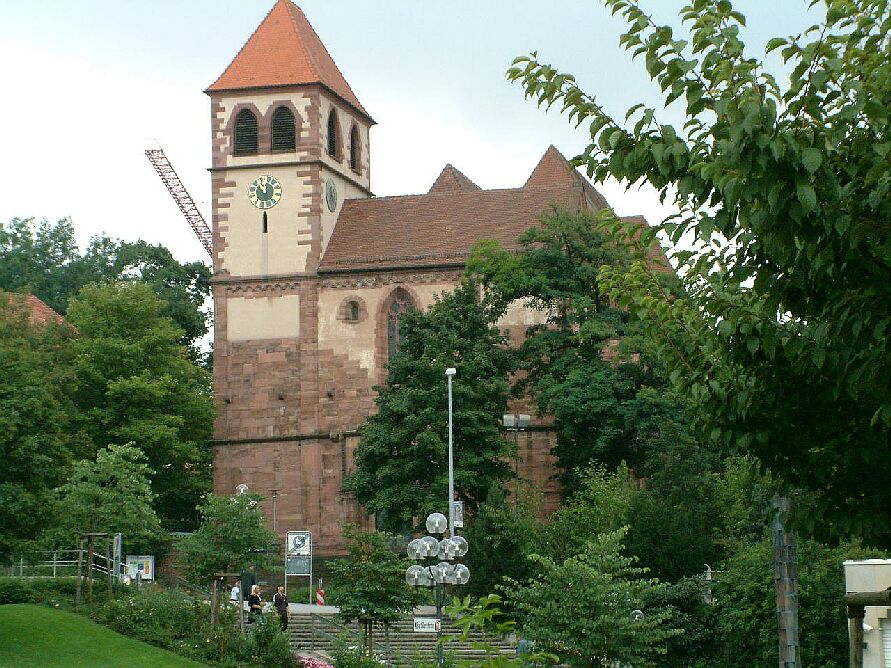
Church of St. Michael

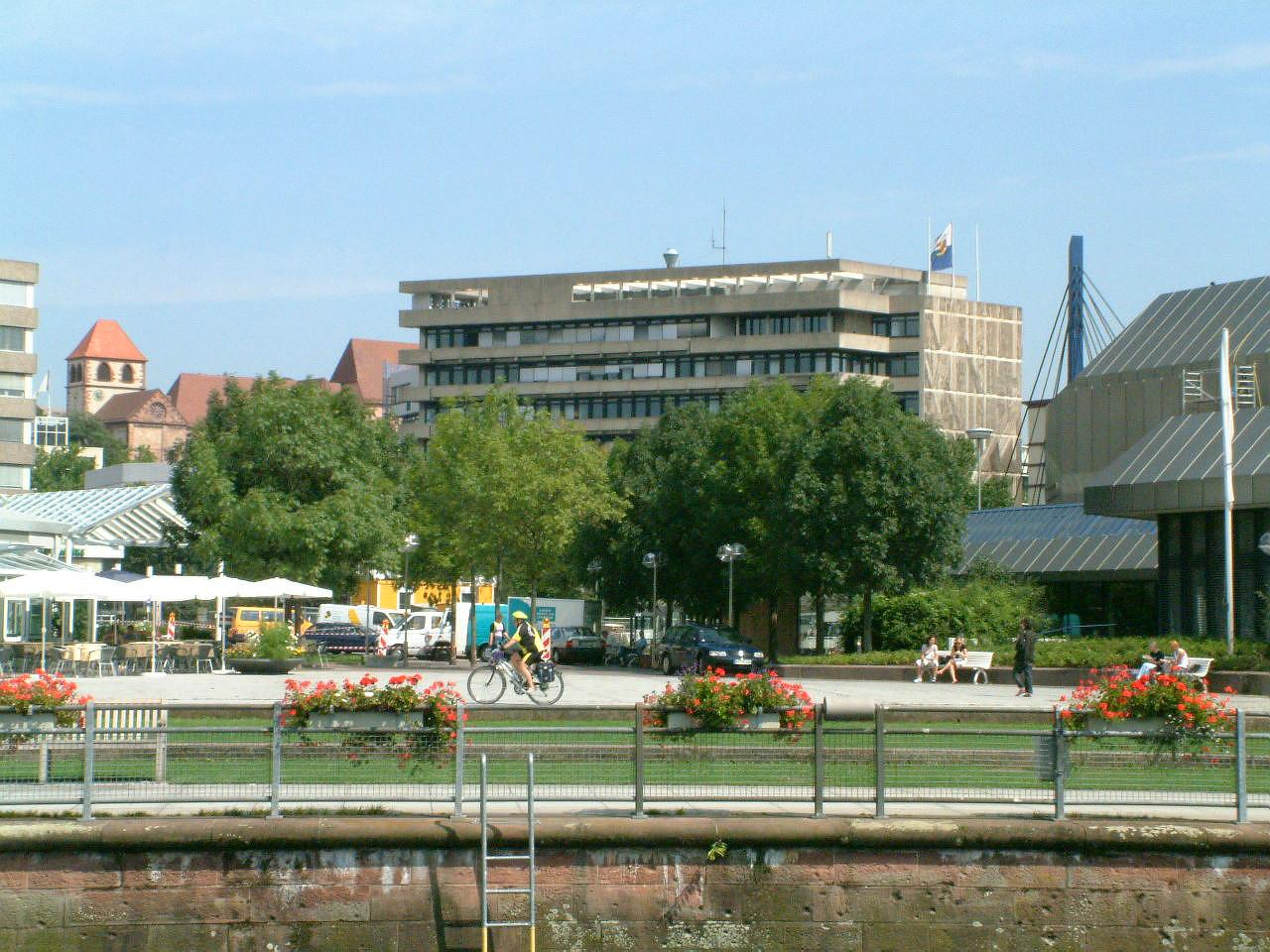
The New City Hall and Waisenhaus square

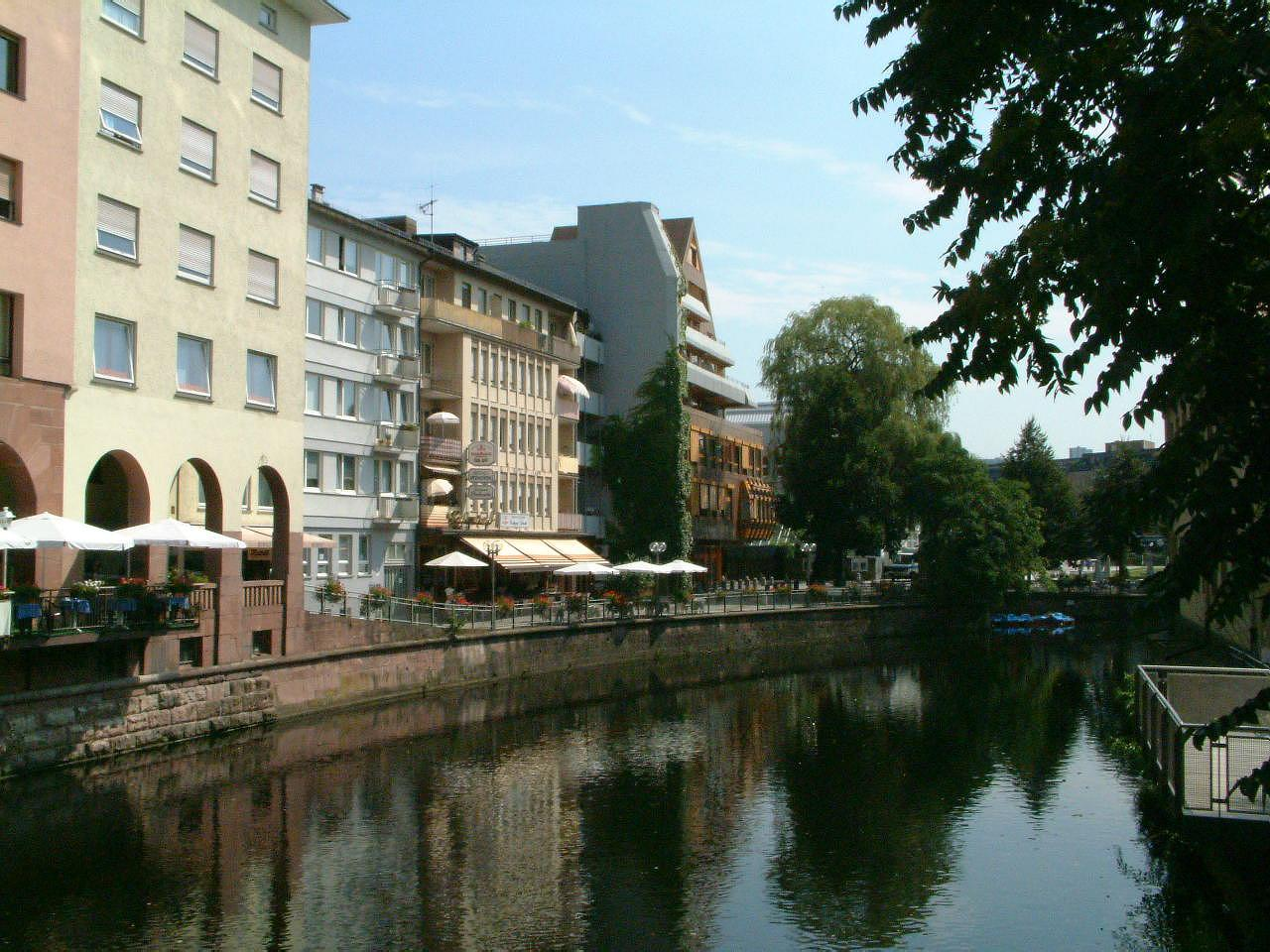
Enz river at Rossbrücke

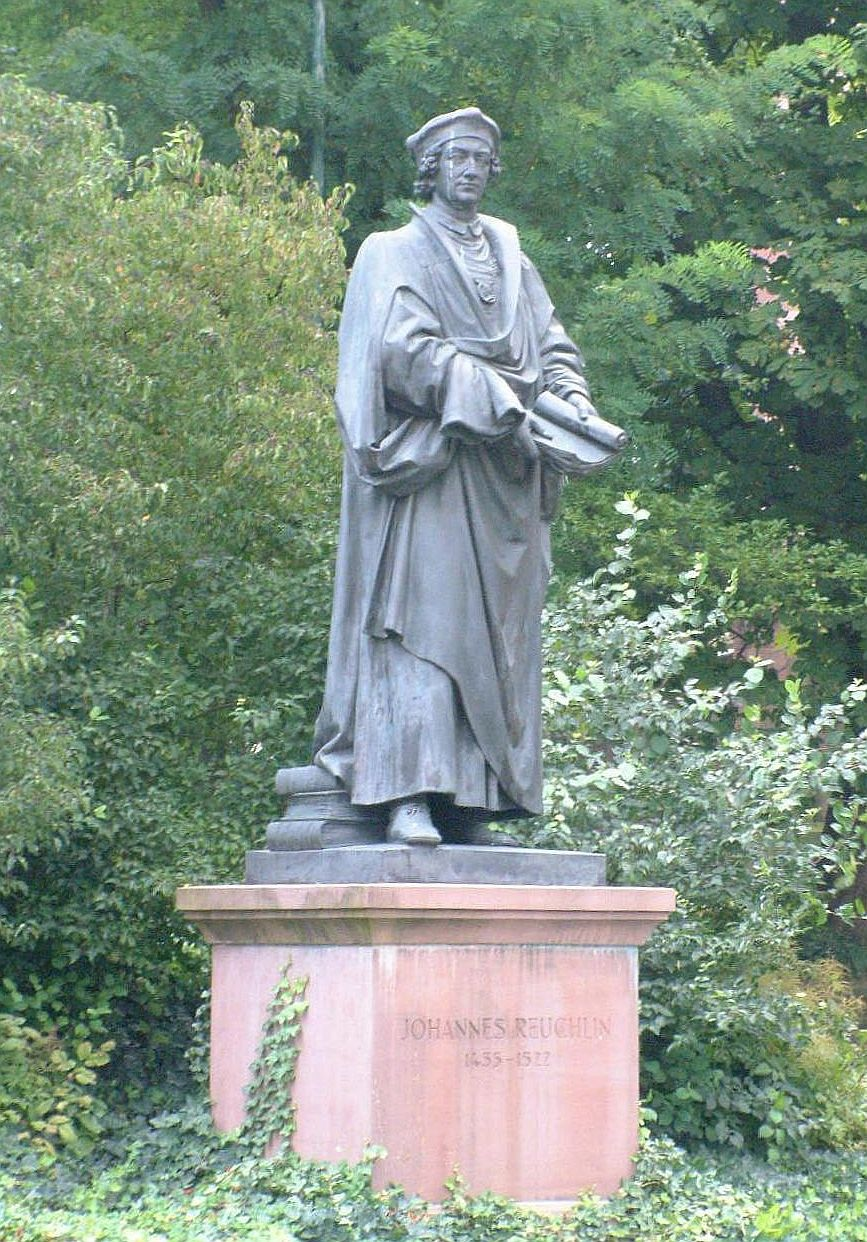
Statue of Johannes Reuchlin

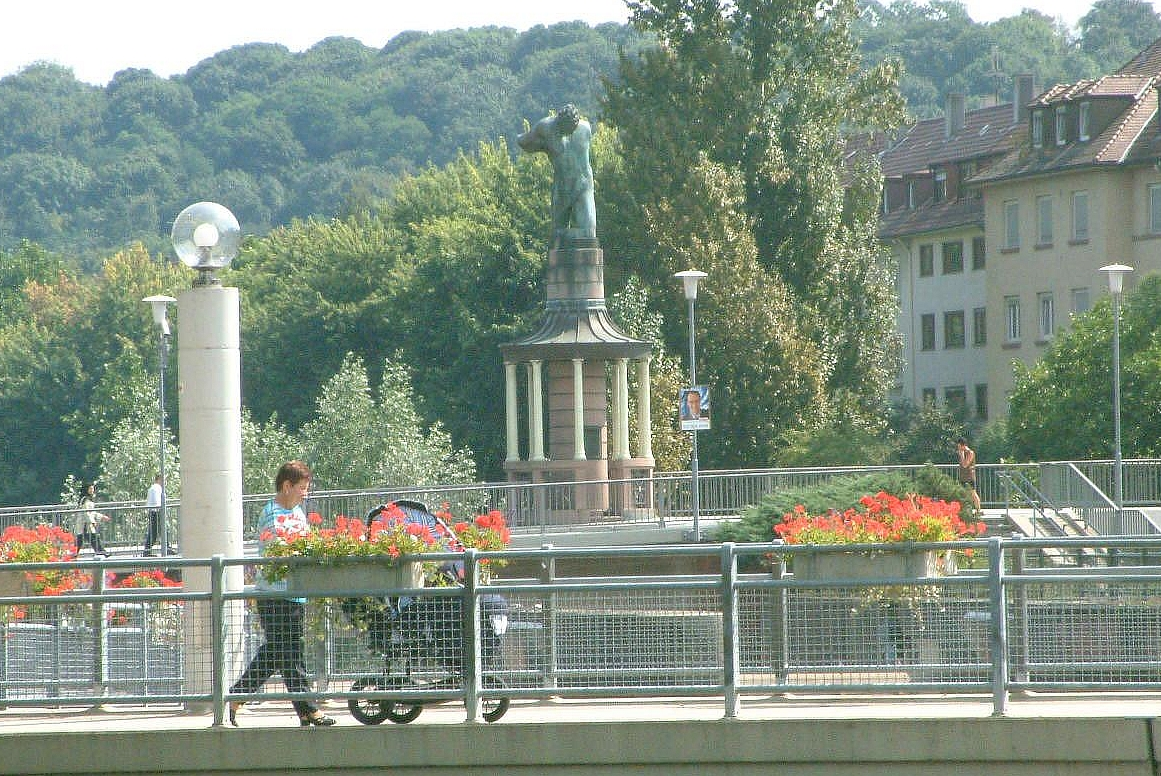
Monument commemorating the timber floating profession in medieval Pforzheim

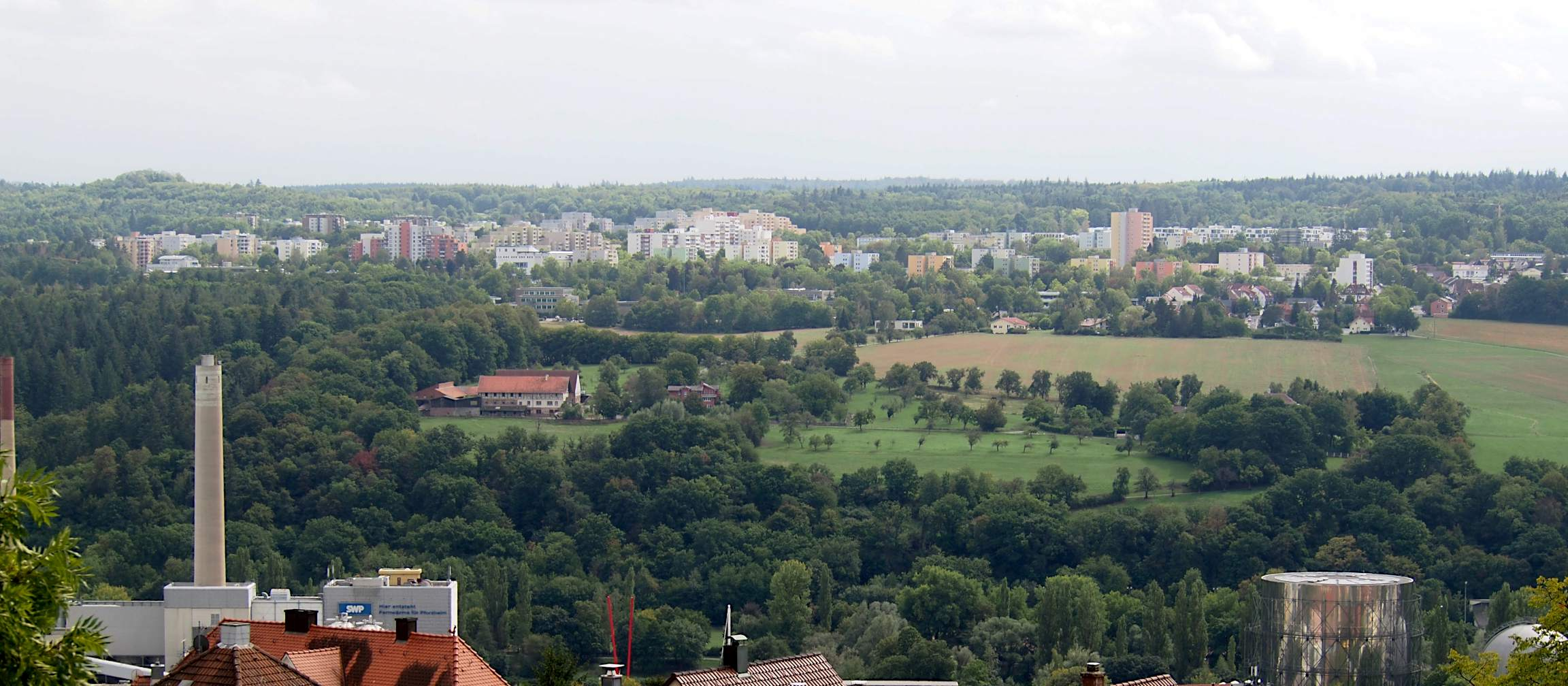
Haidach planned suburb, Buckenberg estate, Enz valley
