= Reuchlin-Gymnasium =

Location
- Schwarzwaldstraße 84; Pforzheim, 75173; Germany; 48°52′56″N 8°41′07″E

Information
- Type: Grammar school
- Headmaster: Wolfgang Essich
- Website: reuchlin-gymnasium.de (in German)

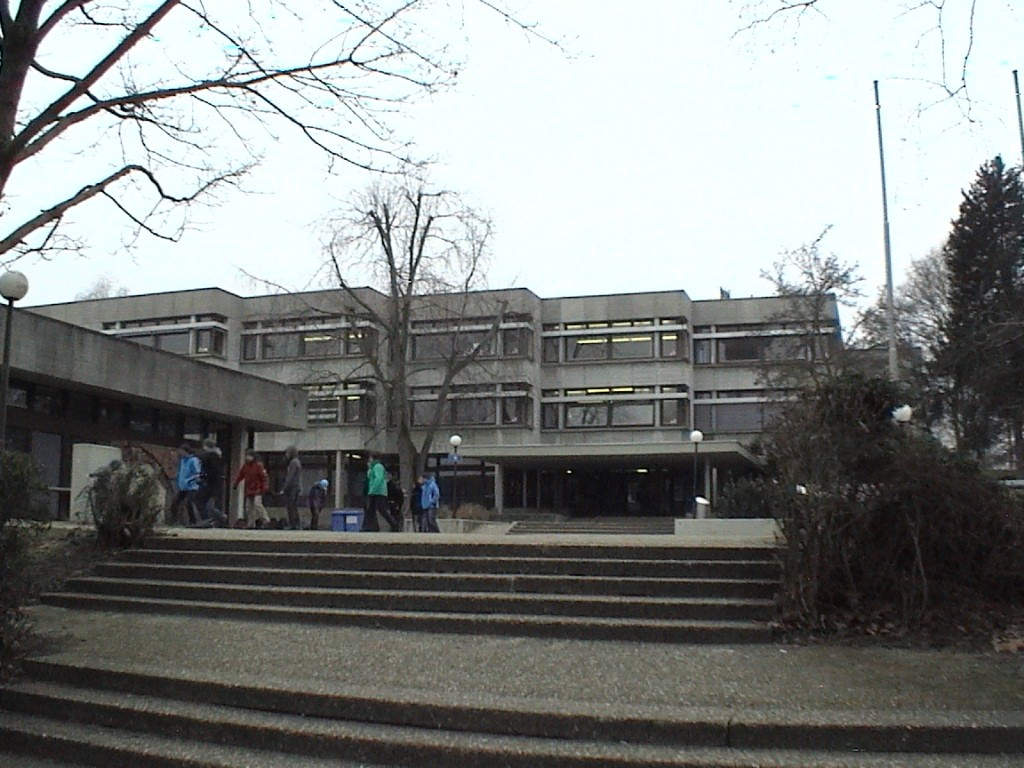
East side of the Reuchlin-Gymnasium Pforzheim main building

Reuchlin-Gymnasium (germ. for Reuchlin Grammar School) is a general educating grammar school of the town Pforzheim in Germany with one language and one science orientation. It was named after the humanist Johannes Reuchlin (1455–1522).

== History ==
The history of Reuchlin-Gymnasium dates back over 500 years. In 1447 a Latin school of Pforzheim was named as predecessor school for the first time, whose founding date is unknown. It probably owes its origins to the institution of a collegiate at castle church St. Michael. Members of the collegiate were most probably teachers as the five year old Johannes Reuchlin entered the school. Reuchlin was taught there for ten years.

In the two last decades of the 15th century the Latin school in Pforzheim became more important as it surpassed the Latin schools of Baden-Baden and Ettlingen. The Latin school in Pforzheim had competent teachers, and great men praised themselves to have received their first education at this school. Around 1500 under rector Georg Simmler the school turned from the collegiate school to an urban school.

The heyday of the school lasted half a century, but with the death of Reuchlin the prominence of the school in Pforzheim gradually decreased.

1692 the monastery in which the Latin school was placed was destroyed in a great city fire. The Latin school wasn't continued until 1718 as Collegium Reuchlianum in the sacristy extension of the castle church.

As an answer to the great growth of the town in the end of the 19th century new school buildings were constructed. In this time the grammar school was built as a successor to the Latin school on the bridge to Goethestraße into which it was moved in 1905. It was a stately renaissance building. The highlight was, that the new school would bear the name "Reuchlin-Gymnasium".

The riverside road on the Enz at the Reuchlin-Gymnasium received the name "Simmlerstraße" in memory of the first known rector of the Latin school. Eleven years later the High Secondary School, now named Hebel-Gymnasium, moved into its new house.

The destruction of Pforzheim on 23 February 1945 ruined the Reuchlin-Gymnasium building stock so severely that it couldn't be rebuilt. Unlike the Reuchlin, the High Secondary School (Hebel-Gymnasium) was rebuilt and accommodated the Reuchlin-Gymnasium and the girls' secondary school in its rooms. For twenty years (1948–1968) the Reuchlin-Gymnasium was a guest at the Hebel-Gymnasium.

1955 the Reuchlin-Gymnasium received its organisational independence back again on the occasion of the humanist Johannes Reuchlin's 500th birthday.

The Reuchlin-Gymnasium couldn't move into the own house on the old water tower until 25 October 1968. The Reuchlin-Gymnasium is located far away from the loud town traffic. Nonetheless it is still near the city centre and with the city bus line 7 and direct school bus it is linked with the central station, and all town districts are easily reachable. The four buildings are amid green areas and schoolyards, the main building with the class room section and an atrium as the meeting place for communication and celebration, the music pavilion, the scientific building with the sports hall, since 1970 the extra building and since 1999 the Greek Theatre. Currently about 900 students visit the Reuchlin-Gymnasium.

== Education ==
After entering the school, the Reuchlin-Gymnasium offers an old language and a new language orientation, plus a bilingual one. The school is especially known for its Highly gifted orientation.

In the old language orientation, Latin is taught four hours per week from the 5th class onwards.

In the new language orientation, the second foreign language is French taught from the 6th class onwards.

The bilingual orientation offers intensified English lessons (six weekly lessons instead of four in class 5, and four instead of three in class 6) and also from class 6 onwards French.

In class 8 every student has the choice between Ancient Greek and Naturwissenschaft und Technik (English Science and technical education). Students of all forms, who haven't chosen French for class 6, can choose it now.

The highly gifted orientation, which the school has had since 2006, teaches Latin from class 5 onwards and is taught by extra skilled teachers. For entering the highly gifted orientation a student has to pass a test and some practice lessons.

Also every student can earn the certificate "Europäisches Gymnasium" (English European grammar school), if he chooses Spanish as a 4th foreign language, thus studying two old languages (Latin and Greek) and two modern languages (English and Spain). If chosen, the English lessons are reduced to two weekly lessons.

== Events ==
- Adventsrock (Advent Rock): Every year in the atrium of the Reuchlin-Gymnasium on the first Friday of December the Adventsrock takes place. It is planned and organized by the event-referees of the student council. The event took place in 2008 for the 26th time with about 1000 visitors.
- Jazzabend (Jazz Eve): Jazz eve also takes place regularly in the atrium of the Reuchlin-Gymnasium.
- Musikabend (Music Eve): Music eve takes place with mostly classical performances of students. The String Project and the String Society play some songs.

== Headmaster ==
As of January 2025, the grammar school's headmaster is Wolfgang Essich, the representative headmaster is Claudia Schnabel.

== Extracurriculars ==
The Reuchlin-Gymnasium offers a wide pallet of extracurriculars. The topics range from sports to music, film to theatre as well as learning of languages to IT and ambulance.

== Known formers ==
- Heinrich Otto Wieland (1877–1957), graduation 1896, German chemist and Nobel laureates
- Erich Rothacker (1888–1965), graduation 1907, German philosopher
- Richard Ziegler (1891–1992), German painter
- Wilhelm Baur (1895–1973), German publisher
- Laura Perls (1905–1990), German psychoanalyst
- Herbert Witzenmann (1905–1988), German fabricant and philosopher
- Frithjof Rodi (born 1930), German author and professor of philosophy
- Martin Boss (born 1959), graduation 1978, German archaeologist
- Uwe Hübner (born 1961), graduation 1981, German presenter
- Nicola Thost (born 1977), graduation 1996, German snowboarder
