= Wellendorff =

German jewellery manufacturer

Wellendorff Gold-Creationen GmbH & Co. KG
- Company type: family-owned
- Industry: Ordinary jewellery
- Founded: 1893
- Headquarters: Pforzheim, Germany
- Area served: Worldwide
- Products: jewellery
- Number of employees: 120
- Website: www.wellendorff.com

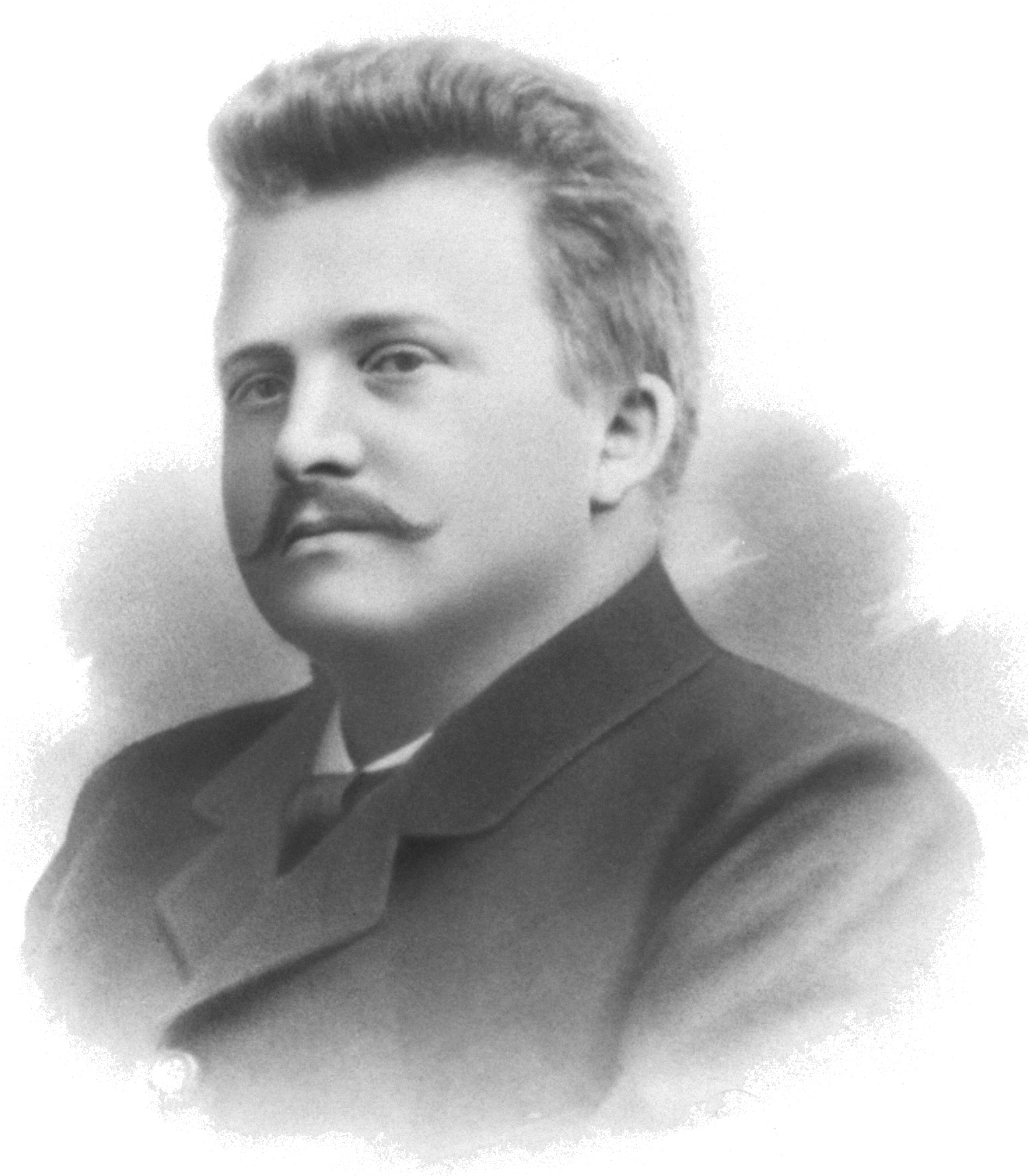
Founder: Ernst Alexander Wellendorff

Wellendorff is a family-owned German manufacturer of jewellery headquartered in Pforzheim, Baden-Württemberg.

== History ==
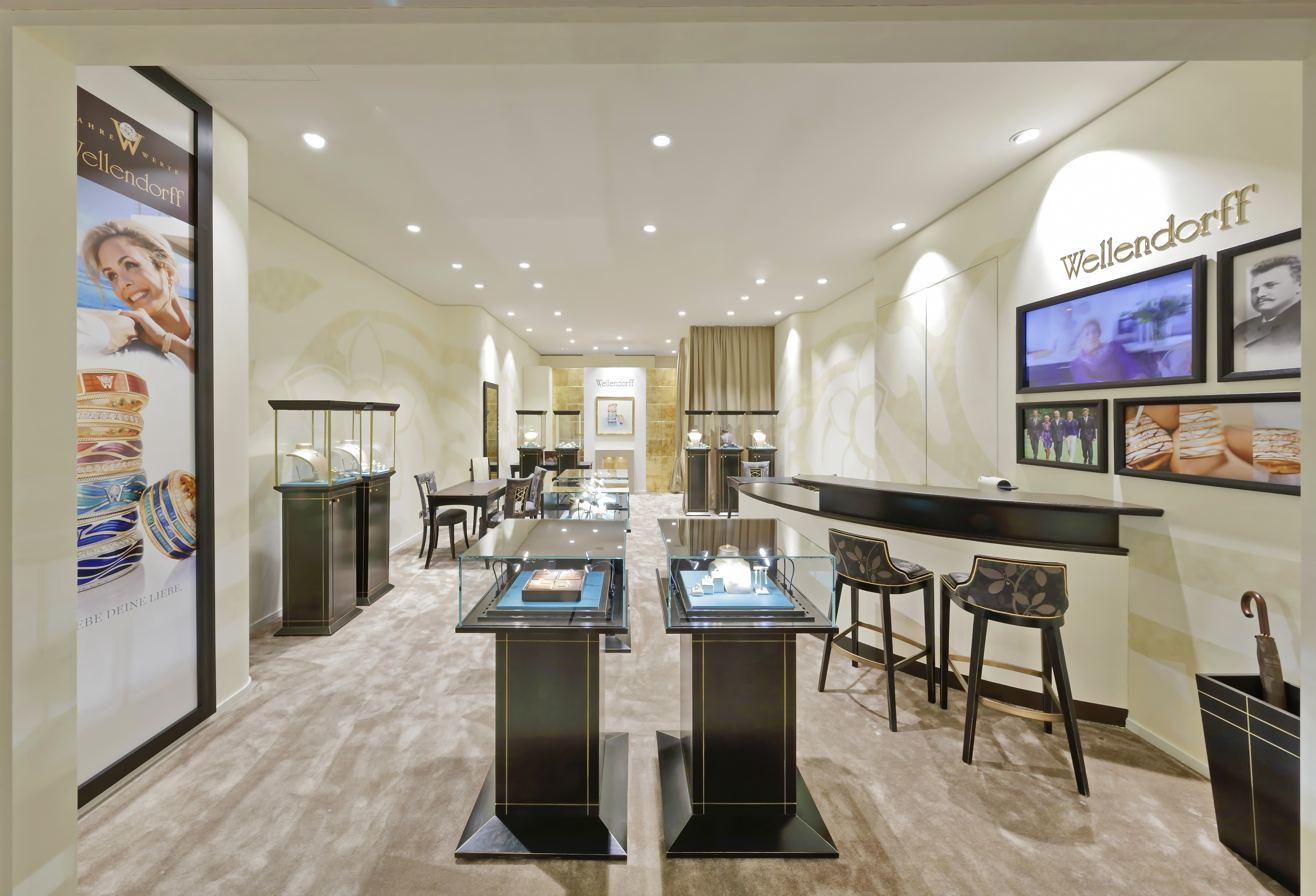
Wellendorff boutique at the KaDeWe Berlin

The manufactory was established in 1893 by Ernst Alexander Wellendorff and is now run by his great-great-grandchildren.

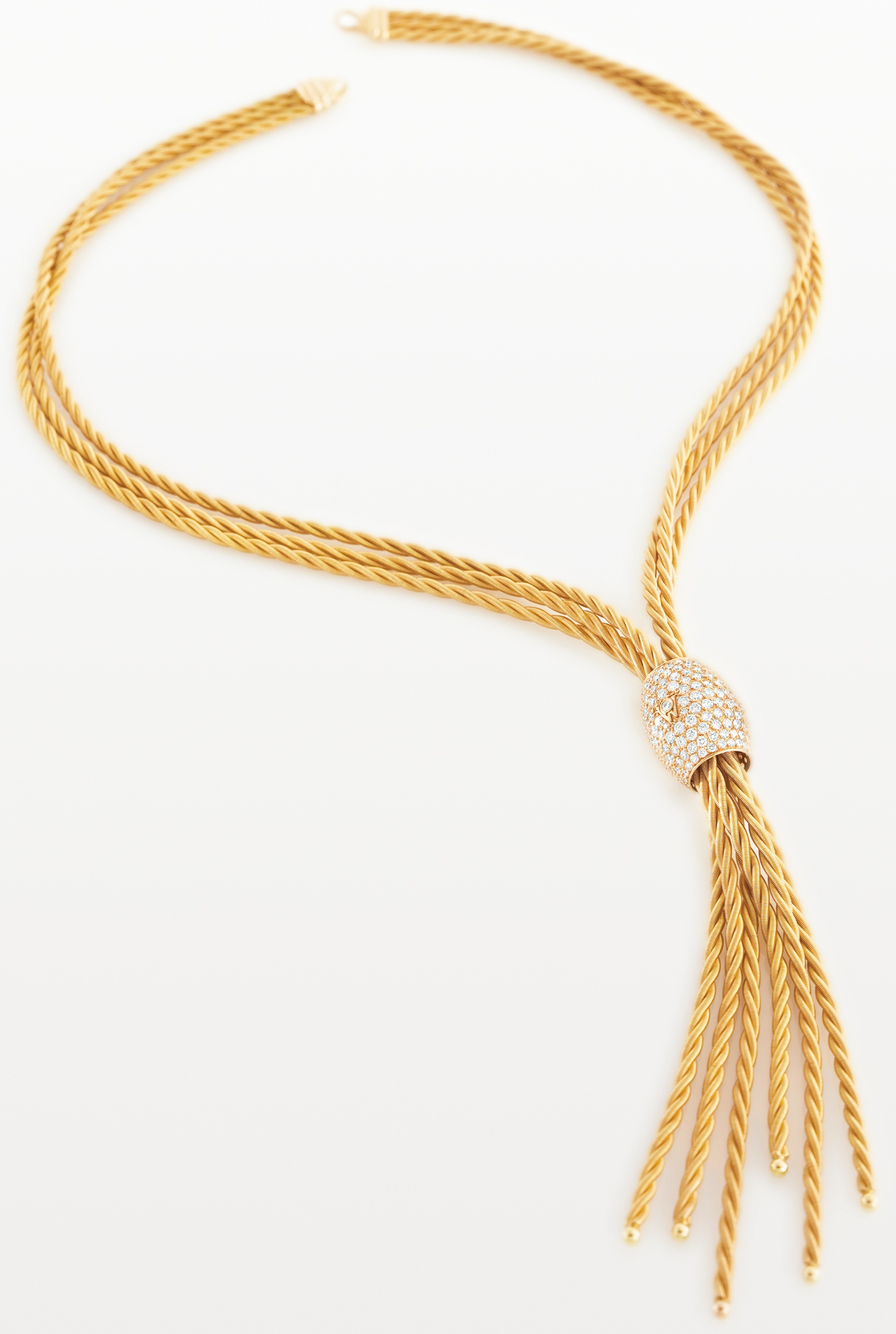
Example of a "Wellendorff rope"

The Wellendorff rope first appeared in 1977, its recipe unchanging through the years. Christoph Wellendorff claims that their jewellery cannot be replicated exactly how they craft it. Since 1993 the company has produced a collection of cold enamel jewellery and rings.
