= Friolzheimer Riese =

Former communications tower in southwest Germany

Coordinates: 48°50′21″N 8°51′15″E

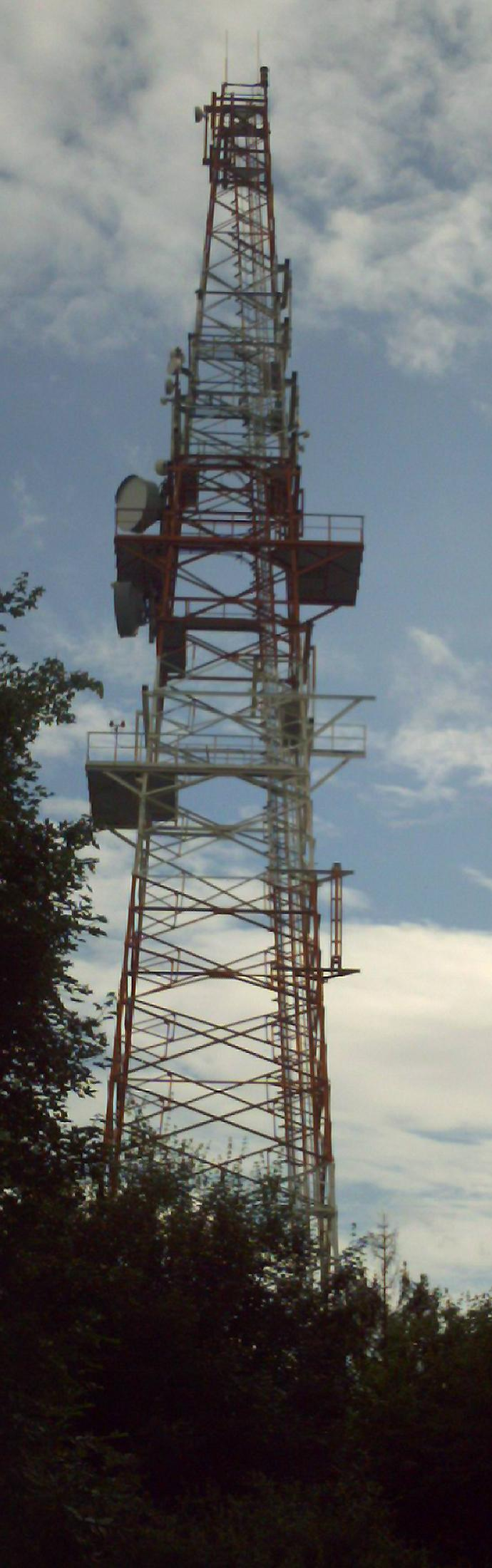
Friolzheimer Riese

The Friolzheim Giant (German: Friolzheimer Riese) was a 47-metre-tall (154 ft) lattice tower on Geissberg, a mountain northeast of Friolzheim in Baden-Württemberg, Germany. It was dismantled in 2021.

Until 2003 it was used as radio relay for the US military (during its final use as a US facility, as part of the Defense Information Systems Network) in Germany, and for non-military communication afterwards. A special feature of it were the four large concrete basements on which its four legs stop.
