= Friolzheim =

German municipality

- Municipality
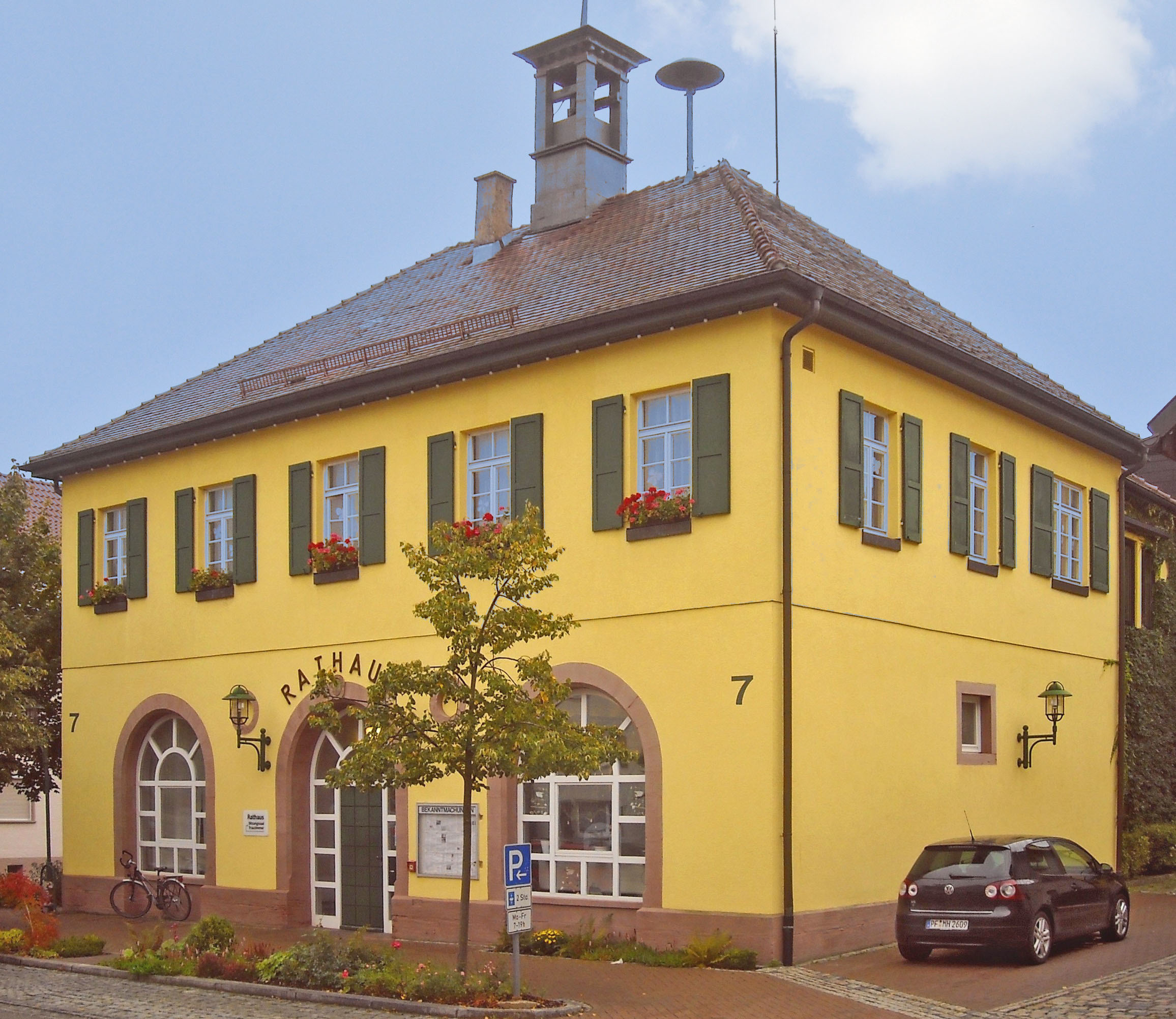
- Friolzheim town hall

- Coat of arms

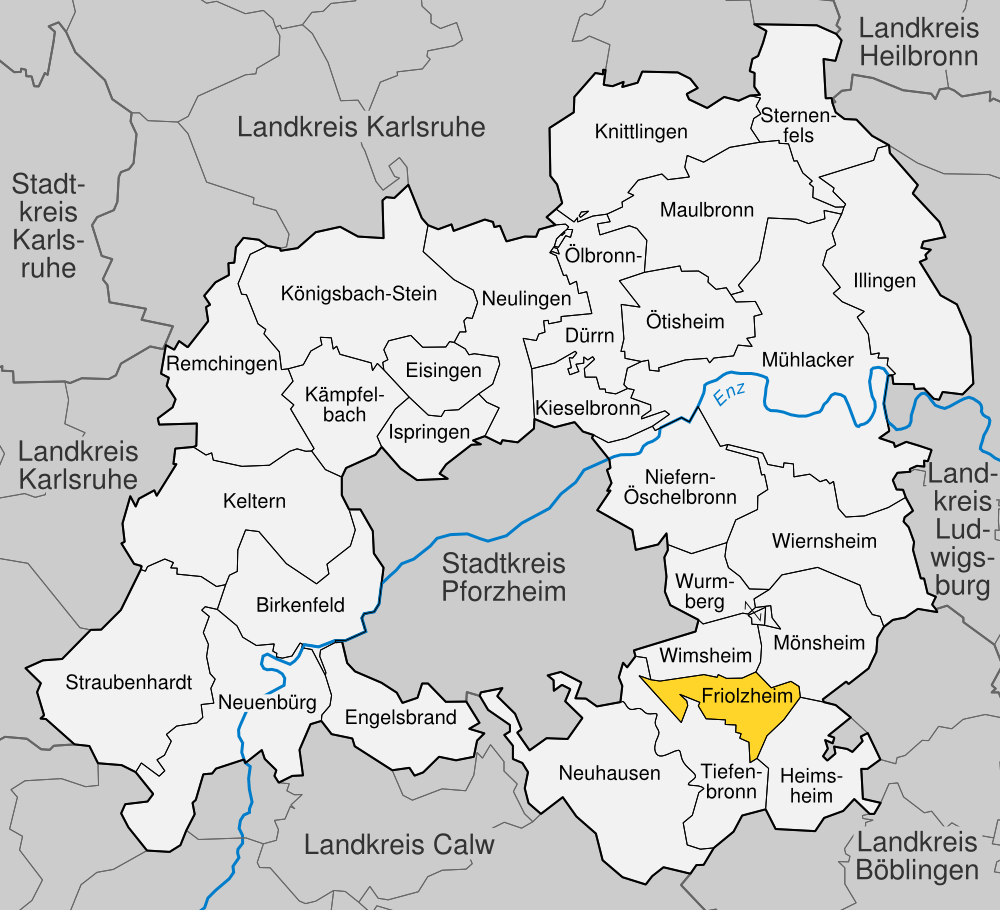
- Location of Friolzheim within Enzkreis district
- Interactive map of Friolzheim
- Location within Germany Location within Baden-Württemberg
- Coordinates: 48°50′10″N 8°50′12″E
- Country: Germany
- State: Baden-Württemberg
- Admin. region: Karlsruhe
- District: Enzkreis

Area
  - Total: 8.54 km^{2} (3.30 sq mi)
- Elevation: 453 m (1,486 ft)

Population (2025-12-31)
  - Total: 4,023
  - Density: 471/km^{2} (1,220/sq mi)
- Time zone: UTC+01:00 (CET)
  - Summer (DST): UTC+02:00 (CEST)
- Postal codes: 71292
- Dialling codes: 07044
- Vehicle registration: PF
- Website: www.friolzheim.de

Friolzheim is a municipality of the Enz district in Baden-Württemberg, Germany. The Friolzheimer Riese telecommunications tower was located here.

== History ==
The village of Friolzheim gradually became a possession of the House of Gemmingen in the 15th century, but then sold the village to Hirsau Abbey. Friolzheim remained a possession of the monastery until it was dissolved in 1807 following German mediatization. Under the Kingdom of Württemberg, Friolzheim was first assigned to Oberamt Calw in 1807, then to Oberamt Leonberg on 26 April 1808. Following the 1973 reorganization of Baden-Württemberg's districts, Friolzheim was assigned to the Enz district.

== Geography ==
The municipality (Gemeinde) of Friolzheim covers 8.54 square kilometers (3.30 mi^{2}) of the Enz district of Baden-Württemberg, a state of the Federal Republic of Germany. Friolzheim is physically located at the edge of the Black Forest and the Upper Gäu. Most of the municipal area lies in the Heckengäu, a region characterized by karstified and forested muschelkalk hills covered with thin layers of soil.

A portion of the Federally-protected Tiefenbronner Seewiesen natural reserve is located in the southeast of the municipality.

== Coat of arms ==
Friolzheim's municipal coat of arms is divided vertically between an image of a stag in gold upon a field of blue on the right, and five bars – three gold and two blue – on the left. The bars on the left are from the coat of arms of the House of Gemmingen, while the stag is a reference to Hirsau Abbey. This pattern was drafted and accepted on the suggestion of the Central State Archive Stuttgart in 1937, as Friolzheim had had no coat of arms until then. It was officially approved by the Federal Ministry of the Interior on 11 December 1957.
