= Engelsbrand =

German municipality

- Municipality
- Coat of arms

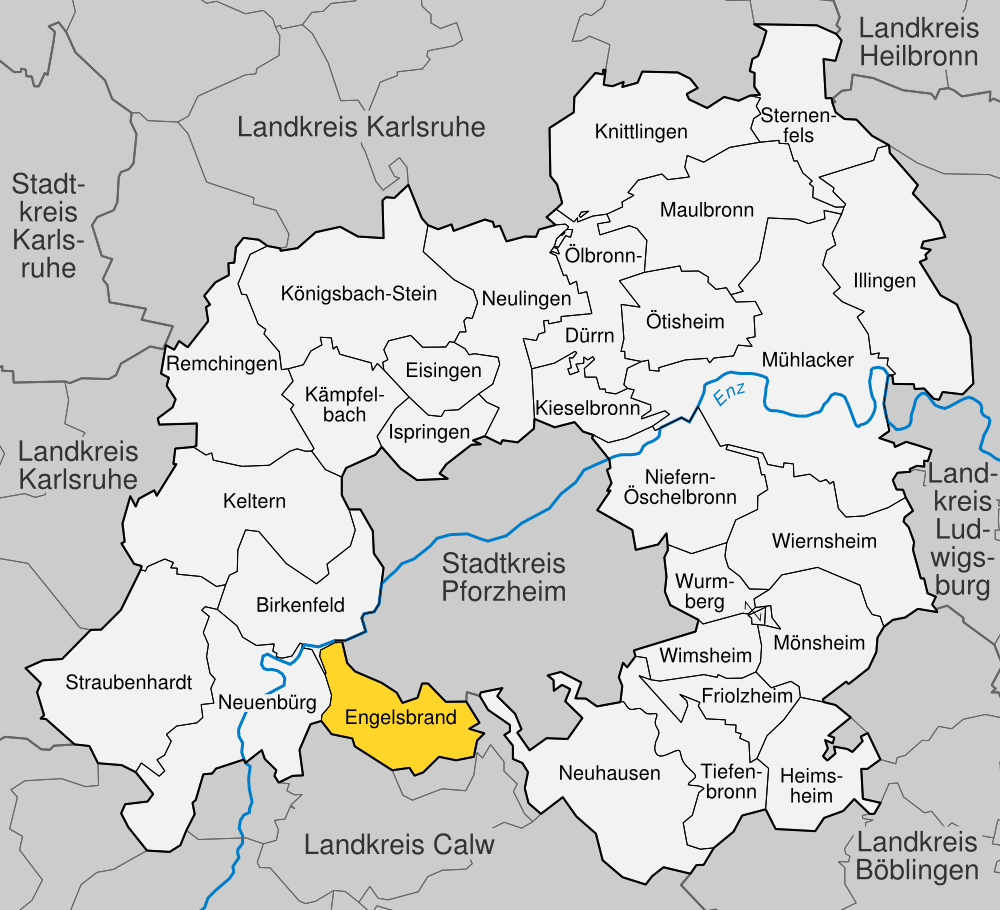
- Location of Engelsbrand within Enzkreis district
- Interactive map of Engelsbrand
- Location within Germany Location within Baden-Württemberg
- Coordinates: 48°49′48″N 08°39′00″E
- Country: Germany
- State: Baden-Württemberg
- Admin. region: Karlsruhe
- District: Enzkreis

Area
  - Total: 15.19 km^{2} (5.86 sq mi)
- Elevation: 587 m (1,926 ft)

Population (2025-12-31)
  - Total: 4,493
  - Density: 295.8/km^{2} (766.1/sq mi)
- Time zone: UTC+01:00 (CET)
  - Summer (DST): UTC+02:00 (CEST)
- Postal codes: 75331
- Dialling codes: 07235 / 07082
- Vehicle registration: PF
- Website: www.engelsbrand.de

Engelsbrand is a municipality in the district of Enz in Baden-Württemberg, Germany. It is home to the luxury watchmaker Stowa. It contains the villages of Engelsbrand, Salmbach, and Grunbach.

== History ==
The three villages of Engelsbrand, Salmbach, and Grunbach were founded in the 11th or 12th centuries Waldhufendorf as part of the settling of the area around Hirsau Abbey. The first documentation of the communities occurred on 24 July 1404, when canons from Brötzingen requested the separation of several villages, including the Engelsbrand three, from Brötzingen for the formation of a new parish in Langenbrand. This application was approved on 10 September of the same year, making Engelsbrand subservient to the Count of Württemberg.

The Engelsbrand three were struck with plague and frequently sacked during the Thirty Years' War, the reign of Louis XIV of France, and the Coalition Wars. In 1807, the three villages were assigned to Oberamt Calw, a province of the Kingdom of Württemberg. Three years later, they were assigned to Oberamt Neuenbürg, which both came under the Schwarzwaldkreis in 1817.

== Coat of arms ==
Engelsbrand's coat of arms since 1984

The coat of arms of Engelsbrand shows a holly leaf with two berries and a burning log over a white field divided by an oblique and wavering blue band, combining the coats of arms of the three villages in the municipality. A first draft of this coat of arms, commemorating the merger of Engelsbrand, Grunbach, and Salmbach into one municipality on 1 January 1975, was authorized for use by the Enzkreis district office on 20 December 1984. The blue band is taken from Grunbach and Salmbach, as is the holly leaf that symbolizes the flora of the Black Forest, while the burning log, representing forest-clearing activities by medieval farmers, is from Engelsbrand proper.
