= Circle of Contempt =

Finnish metalcore band

- Also known as: Thrust Moment (2006–2009)
- Origin: Pori, Finland
- Genres: Progressive metalcore, djent
- Years active: 2006–present
- Labels: Sumerian
- Members: Risto-Matti Toivonen; Markus Karhumäki; Ville Patrikainen; Denis Hautaniemi; JP Kaukonen
- Past members: Riku Haavisto; Joni Kosonen

Circle of Contempt is a Finnish progressive metalcore band formed in Pori in 2006. The band consists of lead vocalist Denis Hautaniemi, bassist Markus Karhumäki, drummer JP Kaukonen and guitarists Risto-Matti Toivonen and Ville Patrikainen. The band has released two full-length albums and four EPs, and is currently operating independently.

== History ==
Circle of Contempt was founded in 2006 under the name Thrust Moment by former vocalist Riku Haavisto, guitarist Risto-Matti Toivonen, bassist Markus Karhumäki and drummer JP Kaukonen. In 2006 they independently released their first demo EP Parallels, followed by two EPs – Rumour Has It... and Color Lines, released in 2007 and 2008 respectively. The band changed its name to Circle of Contempt in early 2009, announcing their signing to the US label Sumerian Records. Later in 2009, Joni Kosonen joined the band as a second guitarist. Their debut album Artifacts in Motion was released on 23 November 2009. In early 2010 Circle of Contempt supported Veil of Maya on their US tour, along with Periphery and Animals as Leaders. Vocalist Riku Haavisto left Circle of Contempt in July 2011, soon to be replaced by current vocalist Denis Hautaniemi. The band performed at the 2012 Euroblast Festival in Cologne, Germany. Guitarist Joni Kosonen announced his departure from the band in late 2012. He was replaced by guitarist Ville Patrikainen of the Finnish melodic death metal band Kill the Romance.

Their third EP Entwine the Threads was released in December 2012 through Sumerian Records. It was produced by Sami Raatikainen of Necrophagist, who was also featured on the album's title track. In 2014 the band dropped from Sumerian Records for unresolved reasons. Since then, they have operated independently. After a period of hiatus, in February 2016 the band announced they will release a new album entitled Structures for Creation. It was released independently on 1 July 2016.

== Members ==
Current

- Risto-Matti Toivonen – guitars (2006–present)
- Markus Karhumäki – bass guitar (2006–present)
- JP Kaukonen – drums (2006–present)
- Denis Hautaniemi – vocals (2011–present)
- Ville Patrikainen – guitars (2012–present)

Former

- Joni Kosonen – guitars (2009–2012)
- Riku Haavisto – vocals (2006–2011)

Timeline

== Discography ==
Studio albums

- Artifacts in Motion (2009) (Sumerian Records)
- Structures for Creation (2016) (self-released)

EPs

- Parallels (2007) (Demo)
- Rumour Has It... (2007) (self-released)
- Color Lines (2008) (self-released)
- Entwine the Threads (2012) (Sumerian Records)
