= Gaggenau =

- Town
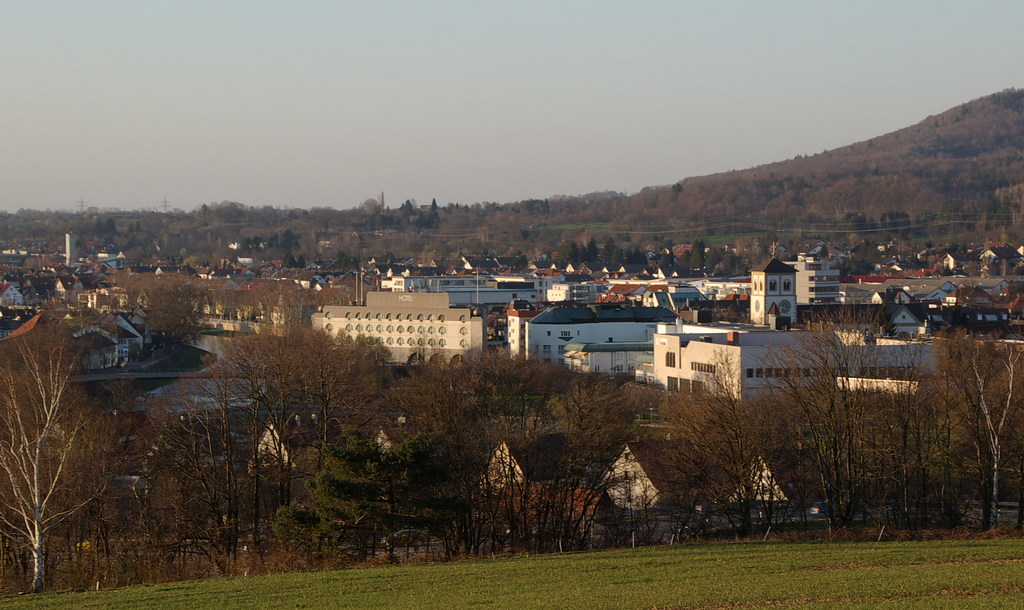
- Gaggenau

- Coat of arms

- Location of Gaggenau within Rastatt district
- Interactive map of Gaggenau
- Location within Germany Location within Baden-Württemberg
- Coordinates: 48°48′14″N 08°19′10″E
- Country: Germany
- State: Baden-Württemberg
- Admin. region: Karlsruhe
- District: Rastatt
- Subdivisions: 8 districts

Government
  - Mayor (2023–31): Michael Pfeiffer (Ind.)

Area
  - Total: 65.01 km^{2} (25.10 sq mi)
- Elevation: 141 m (463 ft)

Population (2025-12-31)
  - Total: 29,394
  - Density: 452.1/km^{2} (1,171/sq mi)
- Time zone: UTC+01:00 (CET)
  - Summer (DST): UTC+02:00 (CEST)
- Postal codes: 76551–76571
- Dialling codes: 07225
- Vehicle registration: RA
- Website: www.gaggenau.de

Gaggenau (German pronunciation: [ˈɡaɡənaʊ]) is a town in the district of Rastatt, in Baden-Württemberg, Germany. It is located some 8 km northeast of Baden-Baden.

== History ==
Gaggenau was first mentioned in local records in 1243 under the name "Gaggenaw". The present district of Bad Rotenfels is even older, having been mentioned in a royal donation letter in 1041. Gaggenau remained a small village until the 19th century: Originally part of the Ufgau, it came under the jurisdiction of the marquisate of Baden in the 13th century, and was included in the territory claimed by the Margrave of Baden-Baden in 1535, which held it until 1689. At that time, it was placed under the jurisdiction of the Kuppenheim district of the Bishopric of Speyer. It was eventually assigned to the jurisdiction of the Rastatt Office of the State of Baden, which later became the District of Rastatt.

In 1691, the area was at the heart of the Palatinate War of Succession and was almost completely destroyed by the French forces. In 1772, Anton Rindeschwender established a successful glassworks factory below the village, and along with it a number of new residences and supporting businesses in the area.

The real industrial boom began in 1873 with the establishment of the Michael Flürscheims Ironworks, which resurrected an iron smelter originally established by the Margrave of Baden in the late 18th century. In 1895 the factory built the 5-hp automobile Orient Express and entered the new industry of automobile manufacture. In 1905 they renamed themselves the Gaggenau South German Automobile Factory GmbH. In 1907 the company was taken over by the company Benz & Cie of Mannheim until the merger of Daimler-Benz AG in 1926.

Thus, the settlement grew, and Gaggenau was eventually raised to the status of a town on 15 September 1922 because of its economic prosperity.

In September 1944, the Nazis built a detention camp in the Bad Rotenfels district. Six barracks were built to house about 1,600 men and women, mostly French prisoners, who were used as forced labour in the Daimler-Benz plants. About 500 of them were killed. A memorial plaque has been raised in the meadow where the barracks were located. Another memorial was raised in the Bad Rotenfels cemetery commemorating the murder of 27 of those prisoners by their Nazi captors.

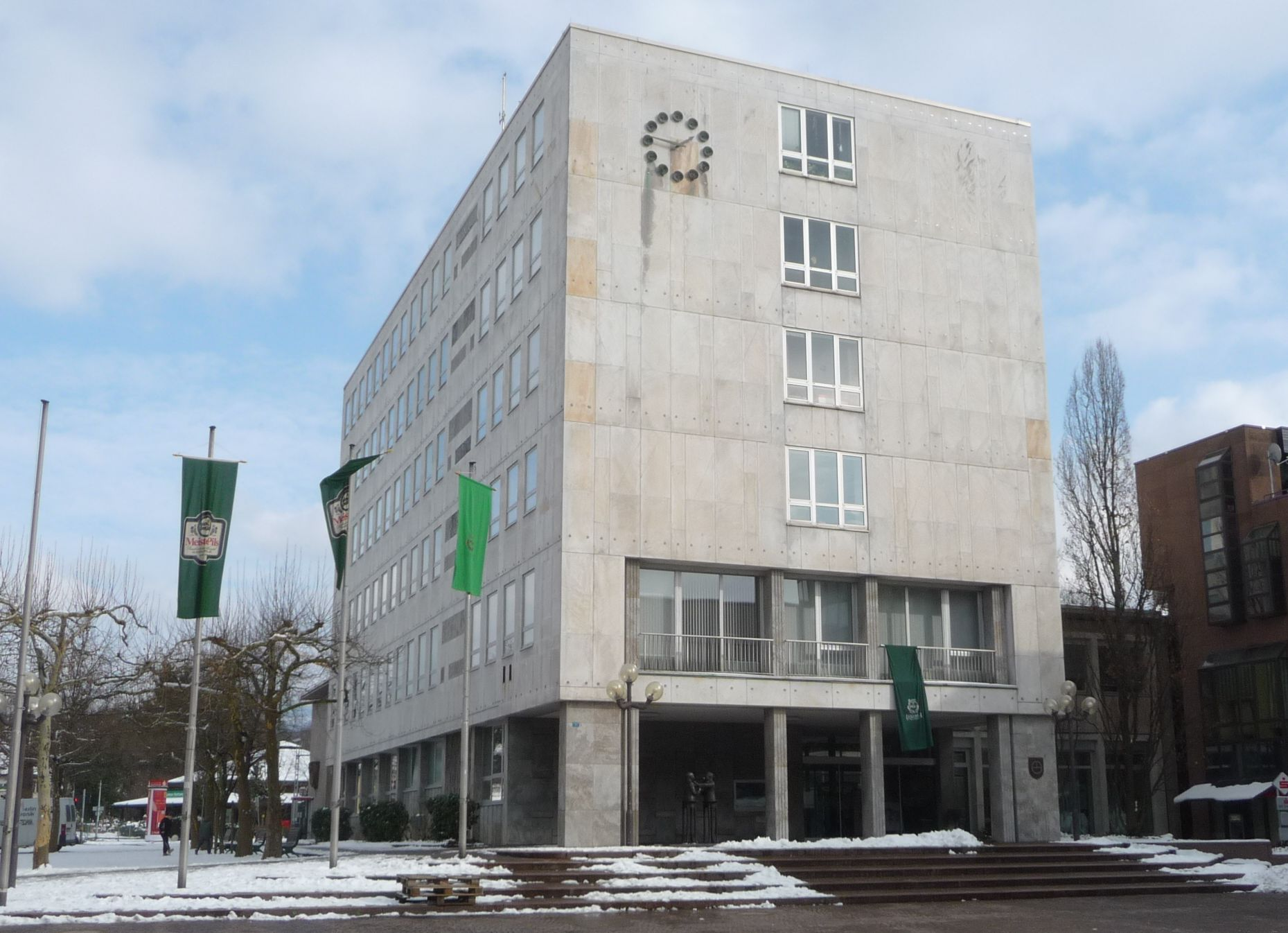
Town hall

In World War II, about 70% of the town was destroyed. On 10 September 1944, 140 B-17 bombers from the 8th battalion of the US Air Force bombed the automobile factory complex. Another battalion of 139 B-24 bombers bombed the area a second time on 3 October. The town and surrounding area was rebuilt after the war, and was completed with the construction of Gaggenau's town hall in 1958.

In 1969, in response to an effort to aggregate and consolidate municipal governments into districts of 20,000 or more, the state government of Baden-Württemberg approved a petition by the town of Gaggenau to annex six of its surrounding communities, thereby doubling Gaggenau's population and increasing its area fivefold. Among the areas annexed was the former municipality of Rotenfels and the large swath of forest that ran along the Murg River between the two municipalities. The annexations were performed over a period of six years.

=== Annexations ===
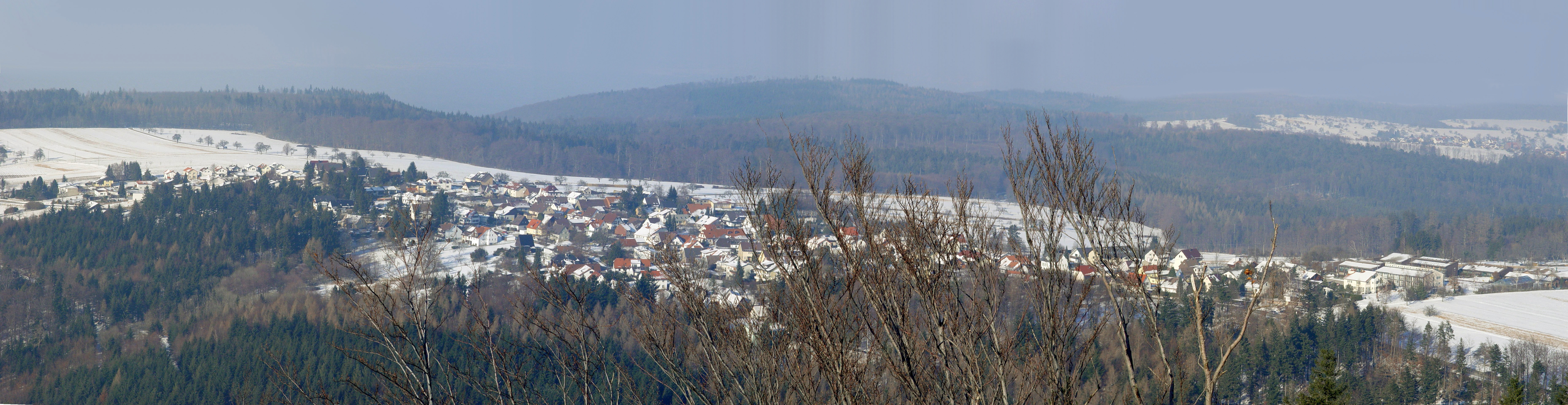
Freiolsheim as seen from the Mahlberg Hill

The following communities were annexed into the town of Gaggenau on the following dates. They were all administered under the office or district of Rastatt:

- 1935: Ottenau
- 1 January 1970: Bad Rotenfels, with the hamlet of Winkel
- 1 April 1970: Selbach
- 1 September 1971: Freiolsheim with the hamlet of Moosbronn and the village of Mittelberg
- 1 April 1972: Oberweier with the villages of Upper and Lower Weier
- 1 April 1973: Sulzbach
- 1 January 1975: Hörden and Michelbach

Bad Rotenfels, Gaggenau and Ottenau together were combined into a single administrative "village" in accordance with the Municipal Code of Baden-Württemberg.

=== Population development ===
Population figures for the respective territorial status. The figures are census results (¹) or official updates of the respective statistical offices (only primary residences):

Year	Population
1450	100
1550	350
1650	160
1790	520
1833	1,071
December 1880 ¹	1,522
December 1905 ¹	2,400
December 1910 ¹	3,120
1926	4,162
1935	6,600
May 1939 ¹	7,741

Year	Population
1945 ¹	4,500
September 1950 ¹	7,526
June 1961 ¹	12,537
May 1970 ¹	21,132
December 1975	28,846
December 1980	28,533
May 1987 ¹	28,116
December 1990	28,761
December 1995	29,531
December 2000	29,703
December 2005	29,709

¹ Census results

=== Religion ===
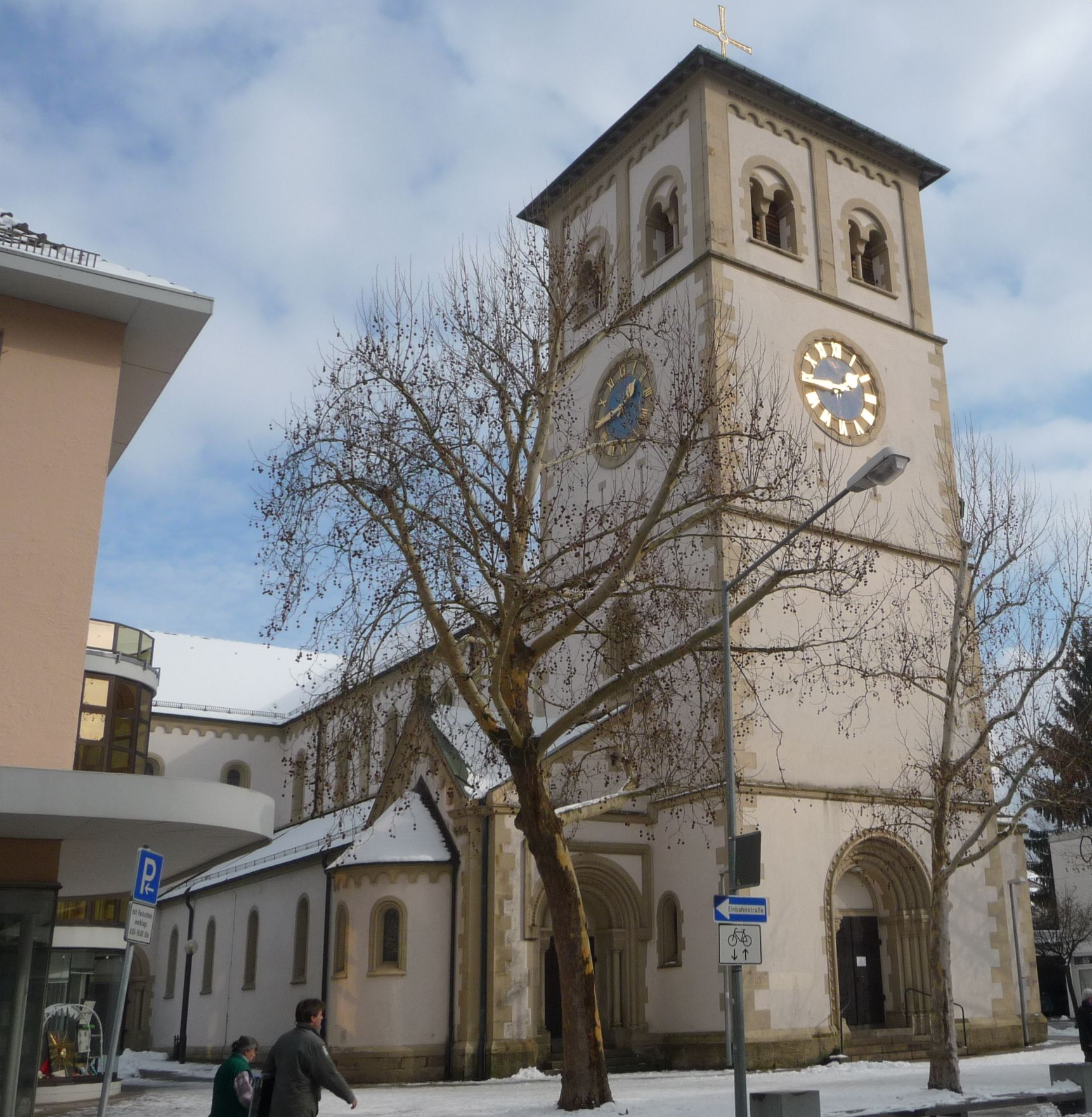
The Catholic Parish of St. Joseph's in the town centre

Gaggenau belonged to the Diocese of Speyer and was assigned to the Kuppenheim District under that Diocese. The Reformation arrived in 1555, and over the next three and a half centuries, under a variety of rulers, the majority denomination of Gaggenau changed six times between Catholic and Evangelical Lutheran (Protestant) before finally settling to become a Catholic majority.

Until 1891, the only Catholic parish church for the entire region was the St. Lawrence parish church in Rotenfels. The present church dates from the Baroque era in the 17th century, with the interior dating from the 18th century. In 1891, the St. Wendelin chapel was consecrated in Gaggenau. Gaggenau received its own parish church of St. Joseph in 1899. The Catholic churches in the other districts of Gaggenau date to earlier times. All of the area parishes came under the newly founded Archdiocese of Freiburg in 1821/1827 and assigned to the Murgtal Office of the Dean. Today, the town of Gaggenau includes the following Catholic parishes: St. Joseph (Gaggenau); Gaggenau; St. Mary; Mary Help (Moosbronn-Freiolsheim); St. Johann Nepomuk (Hörden); St. Michael (Michelbach); St. John the Baptist (Oberweier); St. Lawrence (Bad Rotenfels); St. Nicholas (Selbach); St. Anne (Sulzbach); and St. Jodocus (Ottenau).

The Evangelical Lutherans (Protestants) were driven out in the 18th century but moved back in again to Gaggenau in the 19th century. They formed their own community and built their own church in 1891. This church was destroyed in the Second World War but rebuilt in 1953. The community, including all of the Protestants in the modern districts of Gaggenau and in Rastatt, belong to the Evangelical Church district of Baden-Baden.

Besides the two major churches above, other Christian communities exist in Gaggenau, including the New Apostolic Church and Jehovah's Witnesses. Over 1,100 Muslims, mainly Turkish, also live in Gaggenau. The Sultan Ahmet Mosque (which belongs to the DİTİB, or the Diyanet İşleri Türk-İslam Birliği) is located in the Bad Rotenfels district and has over 200 members.

== Geography ==
Gaggenau lies on both sides of the Murg River in an extension of the Murg Valley at the Rastatt-Freudenstadt federal highway Bundesstraße 462 (Black Forest Valley road).

The highest point in the urban area is 750 m above sea level; the lowest point is 134 m above sea level. The urban area extends 10.6 km north to south and 10.3 km east to west, or approximately 109 square kilometres.

=== Neighboring municipalities ===
The following boroughs and municipalities border the town of Gaggenau (clockwise from north): Malsch, Marxzell (both in the district of Karlsruhe), Bad Herrenalb (district of Calw), Loffenau und Gernsbach (both in the district of Rastatt), Baden-Baden (City District), and Kuppenheim, Bischweier and Muggensturm (all in the district of Rastatt).

=== Town administration ===
The town of Gaggenau today comprises the town of Gaggenau itself and the eight subdivisions of Bad Rotenfels, Freiolsheim, Hörden, Michelbach, Oberweier, Ottenau, Selbach and Sulzbach. Except for the main town and the villages of Bad Rotenfels and Ottenau, which have been combined into a single residential area for purposes of representation within Baden-Württemberg's municipal structure, each district has its own area council and mayor / chairman. For each district, the area council is elected by the district residents and consists of eight to ten members, with the chairperson of the council serving as mayor. The area councils hear and adjudicate on matters concerning their district.

The district of Freiolsheim includes the original town of Freiolsheim, the village of Mittelberg and the hamlet of Moosbronn. The core area of Gaggenau includes the town of Gaggenau, the village Ottenau, and the hamlet Amalienberg. The Oberweier district includes the villages of Oberweier and Niederweier. The Bad Rotenfels district includes the original village of Bad Rotenfels and the hamlet of Winkel. The original villages of Hörden, Michelbach, Selbach and Sulzbach were retained as separate districts.

== Politics ==
=== Municipal ===
The council of the town of Gaggenau is made up of 26 seats.

Party/List	Seats
CDU	9
Free voters Baden-Württemberg	6
SPD	7
Alliance 90/The Greens	2
FDP	2

=== Mayor ===
When local government was established in the 16th century, a judge-advocate was appointed for life by the Margraviate Overseer to protect the Margrave's interests. By the end of the century, this judge-advocate had expanded to six people to govern the town. At that time, the Margrave of Baden or his representative appointed the jury magistrates as life appointments. In 1809, the office of Vogt ('Steward') was created, appointed by the Margrave. In 1832, a new state law transformed local government. The citizens of the community were to elect a Mayor, which replaced the Vogt; and a Council of 5-6 members.

In 1933, the Nazi policy of Gleichschaltung effectively abolished local and state government and put all German territory under national administrative control. After the demise of the Nazi regime in 1945, state and local governments were re-established. In 1971, the office of Deputy Mayor was established.

==== Stewards and mayors ====
- 1809–1820: Michael Merkel, Steward
- 1821: Jacob Holl, Steward
- 1822: Josef Schmidt, Steward
- 1823–1836: August Henkele
- 1837–1840: Florian Götzmann
- 1840–1849: Adam Hirth
- 1849–1870: Daniel Henger
- 1870–1877: Hieronymus Merkel
- 1877: Kilian Fütterer
- 1878–1881: Karl Lang
- 1881–1902: Franz Bracht
- 1902–1919: Karl Kohlbecker
- 1919–1933: August Schneider
- 1933–1935: Otto Dietz
- 1935: Karl Fütterer
- 1936–1945: Adolf Martin
- 1945–1946: Heinrich Focken
- 1946–1950: Oskar Fritz
- 1950–1968: Josef Hollerbach (1898–1971)
- 1968–1984: Helmut Dahringer (1919–2011)
- 1984–1991: Thomas Schäuble, CDU (1948–2013)
- 1991–2007: Michael Schulz
- 2007–2023: Christof Florus (born 1956)
- Since 2023: Michael Pfeiffer

Florus was elected as Mayor on 25 March 2007 in a runoff election. Florus won against candidates Alois Degler, Wolfgang Seckler and former Mayor Michael Schulz. He was reelected in March 2015 with 95,13 % of the votes. He was the only candidate.

=== Coat of arms ===
The coat of arms of Gaggenau consists of a white representation of a Sester (an old Roman unit of measure for liquids and grain) on a red background. The municipal flag is white and red.

The current coat of arms began appearing on town reference documents in the 18th century, but was replaced in 1901 with a split design of a cogwheel (symbolizing industry in general) on one side and a glass beaker (for the local glassworks industry) on the other. In 1938, the emblem was changed again, this time with the Gaggenau Sester on top and a pruning hook below, in order to reflect the inclusion of the town of Ottenau. It was changed again in 1958 with the images rotated to be equally represented on the shield. Finally, as part of the municipal reform and additional village annexations of the 1970s, the emblem was restored to its original pre-20th-century design by the Interior Ministry of Baden-Württemberg.

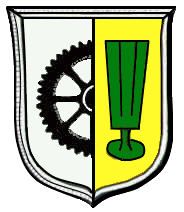
Gaggenau coat of arms, 1901–1938

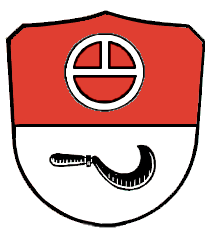
Gaggenau coat of arms, 1938–1958, after annexation of Ottenau

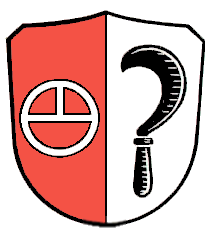
Gaggenau coat of arms, 1958–1971

Gaggenau coat of arms, 19th century & today

== Culture and sights ==
=== Theatre ===
The "Klag-Bühne" in Gaggenau is a nationally known venue for cabaret music and dinner theater. The theatre is located in the town's cultural centre.

=== Museums ===
- The Kast Museum in the Hörden district shows rafting, forest, hunting, history, fairy tales and legends.
- There is a local history museum in the Michelbach district.
- The Unimog Museum is a private museum in the Bad Rotenfels district, owned by Daimler-Benz, that celebrates the history of the Unimog line of trucks manufactured by Daimler-Benz.

=== Buildings ===
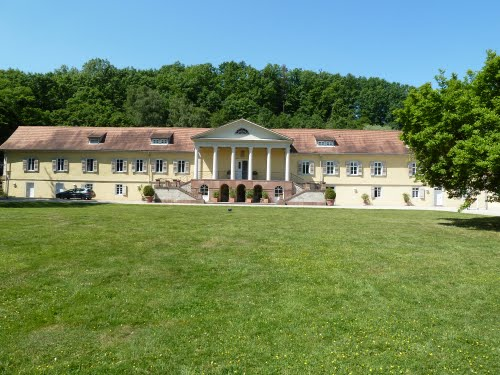
The Rotenfels Castle

In Gaggenau proper, St. Mark's Evangelical Church was built in 1891, and St. Joseph's Catholic Parish was built in 1899 (replacing the original St. Wendelin chapel built in 1891). Both were heavily damaged in World War II and rebuilt after the war with significant design changes. The town hall was also destroyed along with most buildings in the town during the air raids of the Second World War, and was rebuilt in 1957.

The district of Bad Rotenfels has a number of historic buildings. The Baroque Catholic parish church of St. Lawrence in Bad Rotenfels was originally built in 1752–1766 by Ignaz Franz Krohmer. The church was the first parish in the Murg Valley and is therefore known as the mother church of the Murg. The current church building is actually the third version built, the most recent in the mid-1800s. In a 1902–1903 renovation, the facade of the church was updated with a neo-baroque facade.

Other churches in the current town include the St. Johann Nepomuk Hörden Catholic Church (Year 1894), the half-timbered Catholic Church of St. Mary in the Michelbach village from the 13th Century with later alterations, the late Gothic St. John the Baptist Catholic Church in Oberweier, the Selbach Catholic Church from 1756, the neo-Romanesque church in Sulzbach from 1884 and the neo-Gothic parish church in Ottenau from 1906. In the upper village of Bad Rotenfels, at the turnoff to the hamlet of Winkel, the one-room St. Sebastian chapel was built from 1747–1752 with an open porch and roof turret and is smaller than the surrounding rural residences.

Bad Rotenfels is the home of the Rotenfels spa, built on top of the Bad (German: Bath) Rotenfels hot springs. The spa hosts thousands of visitors. The district also includes the Rotenfels Castle Academy, which is housed in the buildings and grounds of the former Rotenfels stoneware factory. The factory, built around 1801, housed a stoneware (porcelain) manufacturing plant until 1816. In 1818, Margrave Wilhelm of Baden decided to turn the property into a country chateau. From 1818 to 1827, the building was redesigned by Friedrich Weinbrenner into a prestigious building in classical portico style. It remained a country residence until the 1970s, when the Academy purchased the building for its use.

=== Parks ===
In the inner town and the suburbs are many wells and springs. The best known of these is the goose fountain, built at the train station in 1981 by Gudrun Schreiner. The fountain represents Gaggenau's founding legend that claims the town of Gaggenau was founded on a spot where geese gathered on a large pond. The town of Gaggenau was named from the cackling of the geese. Hörden also has an interesting fountain, the Fountain Rafters, designed to recall the traditional local craft of raftsmen. The gargoyles represent traditional characters of the Hörden Carnival: The Fürigen Barthel, the stillage and Domino. In the district and former town of Bad Rotenfels, an old draw-well tray was rediscovered by the lower acorn mountain road by the local heritage society and restored for public display.

Gaggenau has created a park along the banks of the Murg River, which runs through its community. Gaggenau also includes a large park on the south side of the river against the forest which hosts a number of significant ruins and springs, including military fortifications dating back to the 16th century, as well as a memorial to a Nazi labor camp where some 1,600 prisoners were housed and used for forced labor. The park includes outdoor sports facilities and marked nature paths with historical markers.

=== Cemeteries ===
The original Rotenfels cemetery was located on the grounds of the St. Lawrence parish church. This cemetery was closed around 1820 and all of the graves except for a representative handful of gravestones of notable town citizens (which were left on the church premises) were relocated to a new cemetery on a small island in the Murg River just south of the town centre. The island is connected to the town via a bridge which spans a canal used to generate hydroelectric electric power. After the Second World War, this island cemetery was closed for further interments and the current cemetery was built between the town centres of Rotenfels and Gaggenau.

=== Regular events / festivities ===
- May Market (now called "Gaggenau May Days"), arose from the former Bad Rotenfels annual fair and market
- Autumn Fair
- Artists and crafts market
- Nicholas Market

== Economy and infrastructure ==
=== Transport ===
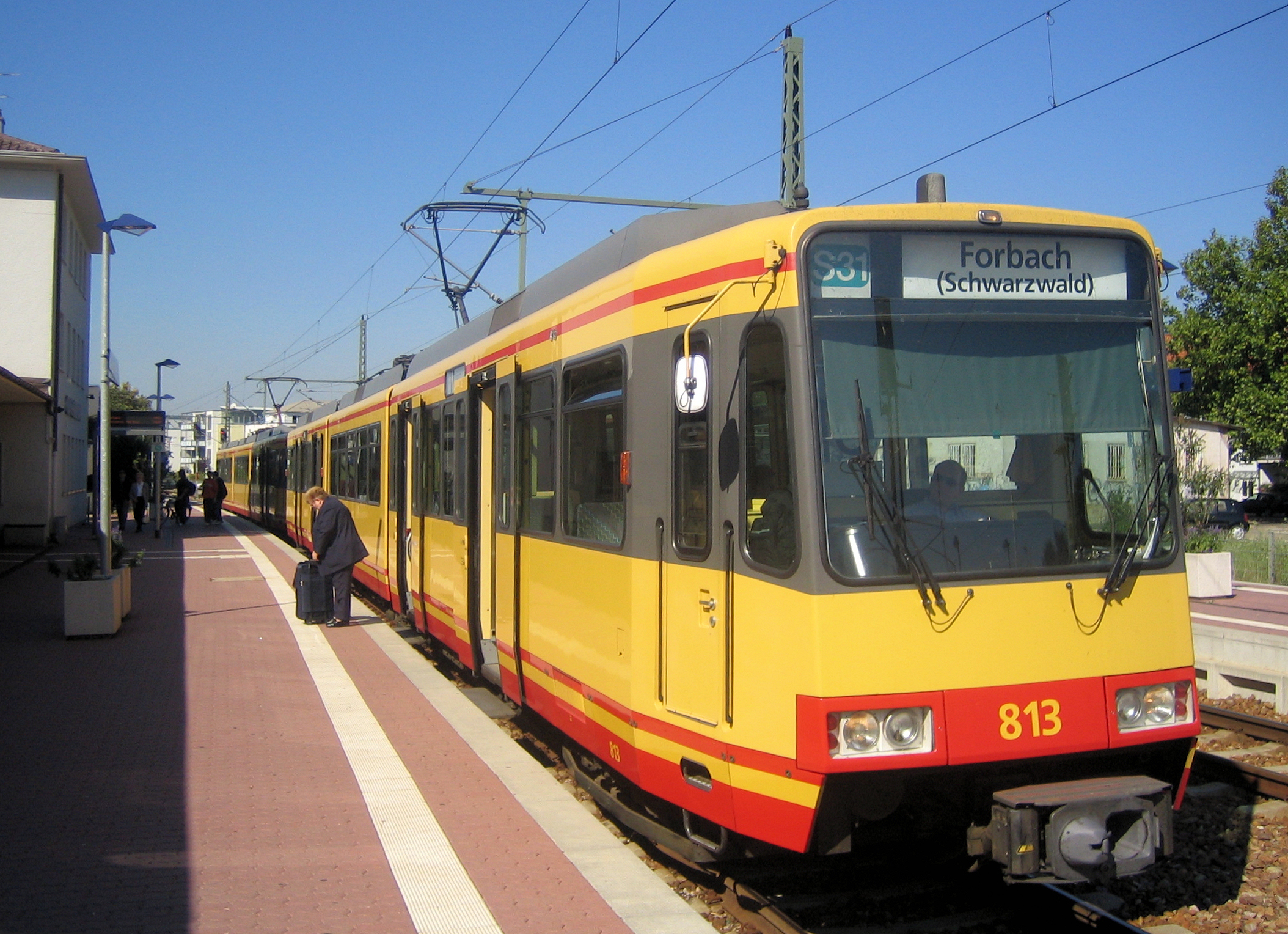
The Light Rail station in Gaggenau

Gaggenau is located on the Rastatt-Freudenstadt Highway 462 (Black Forest Valleys road). The nearest motorway junction is Federal Highway 5 at Karlsruhe-Basel in Rastatt.

The Rastatt-Freudenstadt (Murgtalbahn) line also runs through the town, having done so since the line was electrified in 2002. The Karlsruhe light rail line has also provided direct service to Gaggenau since that time.

=== Local industry ===
- Daimler AG, Mercedes-Benz plant in Gaggenau, the largest employer in the town
- Dambach Group of Companies
- Grötz GmbH & Co. KG
- King Metal
- Kohlbecker Architects & Engineers
- KWH Automotive GmbH
- Gerhard Lang GmbH & Co. KG and scrap metal recycling company
- Lang GmbH & Co. KG Builders
- Florence Mash Protektorwerk
- Precitec GmbH & Co. KG
- PolyOne Th Bergmann GmbH

=== Local media ===
The Badisches Tagblatt (BT), based in Baden-Baden, reports on local happenings and provides local editorials to Gaggenau through their local edition of Murgtäler. Their daily circulation figure is 11,000. The Badische Neueste Nachrichten (BNN), based in Karlsruhe, also provides local coverage of Rastatt and Gaggenau in their local edition with daily circulation figures of 10,000.

Gaggenau Week is a local weekly newsletter. It is distributed free of charge once per week to Gaggenau households, with a circulation of about 16,000 copies. This newsletter is published by Walnut Media, based in Weil. They maintain a field office in the town of Gaggenau.

The Badisches Tagblatt also publishes two local business news journals and a weekly magazine for the Rastatt / Murgtal areas called WO, delivered to households free of charge, with a special Murgtal weekend edition on Sunday. Circulation of WO is about 25,000 copies, the Sunday weekend edition approximately 73,000 copies.

Südwestrundfunk serves as the regional television station, broadcast out of Karlsruhe. It also provides reporting of local events in Gaggenau.

=== Education ===
The town of Gaggenau has one high school (Goethe Gymnasium), a secondary school (Realschule Gaggenau), and three elementary and secondary schools with vocational school (Eichelbergschule Bad Rotenfels, Hebelschule and Merkurschule) the Hans-Thoma- primary school and one elementary school in the suburbs for Selbach (Eberstein Elementary School), Hörden, Michelbach, Oberweier and Sulzbach. Furthermore, the school complex Dachgrub Bad Rotenfels, funded by Erich Kästner-Schule, was established by the district of Rastatt. The area also hosts the Carl Benz School, a vocational school.

The Akademie Schloss Rotenfels has been established In the Rotenfels Castle since 1996. The Baden-Württemberg Academy of Fine Arts school and amateur theater are also located in the community.

== Twin towns – sister cities ==
Gaggenau is twinned with:

- Annemasse, France (1970)
- Sieradz, Poland (2000)

== Notable people ==
- Günther Rall (1918–2009), general in the Luftwaffe Inspector of the Air Force
- Muhammed Suiçmez, technical death metal pioneer and founder of Necrophagist
