= Entwine the Threads =

EP by Circle of Contempt
- Released: 11 December 2012
- Genre: Progressive metalcore
- Length: 19:40
- Label: Sumerian
- Producer: Sami Raatikainen

Circle of Contempt chronology
Artifacts in Motion (2009)	Entwine the Threads (2012)	Structures for Creation (2016)

Entwine the Threads is the fourth EP from Finnish progressive metalcore band Circle of Contempt. It was released by Sumerian Records on 11 December 2012.

== Track listing ==
No.	Title	Length
1.	"Entwine the Threads"	5:04
2.	"Dare to Defy"	3:26
3.	"Transient Belief"	3:20
4.	"To Entitle Vacancy"	4:12
5.	"Perceive the Mendacity"	3:38
Total length:		19:40

== Charts ==
Chart (2012)	Peak position
US Heatseekers Albums	24

== Personnel ==
Circle of Contempt

- Denis Hautaniemi – vocals
- Risto-Matti Toivonen – guitar
- Ville Patrikainen – guitar
- Markus Karhumäki – bass guitar
- JP Kaukonen – drums

Production

- Sami Raatikainen – production, engineering
