= Saint Wendel =

Saint Wendel or Saint Wendelin may refer to:

- Wendelin of Trier (c. 554–c. 617), German hermit and abbot
- Sankt Wendel, a municipality in Saarland, Germany
- Saint Wendel, a constituency of the German Parliament
- Saint Wendel, Indiana
- St. Wendel Township, Stearns County, Minnesota, United States
- St. Wendelin chapel, Freiburg im Breisgau, Germany
- St. Wendelin High School, Fostoria, Ohio, United States

== See also ==
- São Vendelino, a municipality in the state Rio Grande do Sul, Brazil settled by immigrants from Sankt Wendel, Germany
