= Goulon =

Goulon is a surname. Notable people with the surname include:

- Hérold Goulon (born 1988), French footballer
- Romain Goulon, drummer for German technical death metal band Necrophagist
