= Artifacts in Motion =

Studio album by Circle of Contempt
- Released: 23 November 2009
- Genre: Progressive metalcore
- Length: 34:34
- Label: Sumerian
- Producer: Jori Haukio

Circle of Contempt chronology
Color Lines (2008)	Artifacts in Motion (2009)	Entwine the Threads (2012)

Artifacts in Motion is the first studio album from Finnish progressive metalcore band Circle of Contempt. It was released by Sumerian Records on 23 November 2009. The songs "Color Lines", "Nothing Imminent", "C.O.C." and "Scour the Sharpside" are re-recorded from their previous EP titled "Color Lines", released under the band name Thrust Moment

== Track listing ==
No.	Title	Length
1.	"Color Lines"	2:45
2.	"Nothing Imminent"	3:05
3.	"Artifacts in Motion"	3:16
4.	"Concealed"	2:52
5.	"Remnants left"	3:04
6.	"C.O.C."	2:17
7.	"Prelude for the Implication"	4:10
8.	"The Pendulum Swing"	2:43
9.	"A Day for Night"	2:45
10.	"Zerohour"	3:38
11.	"Scour the Sharpside"	3:59
Total length:		34:34

== Personnel ==
Circle of Contempt

- Riku Haavisto – vocals
- Risto-Matti Toivonen – guitar
- Joni Kosonen – guitar
- Markus Karhumäki – bass guitar
- JP Kaukonen – drums

Production

- Jori Haukio – production, engineering
