= Badische Neueste Nachrichten =

German daily newspaper

Badische Neueste Nachrichten (BNN)
- Type: Daily newspaper, 6 issues per week + special Sunday edition
- Founder(s): Wilhelm Baur; Walter Schwerdtfeger
- Editor: Klaus Michael Baur
- Founded: March 4, 1944; 82 years ago
- Language: German
- Headquarters: Karlsruhe
- Country: Germany
- Circulation: 230,000
- Website: bnn.de

Badische Neueste Nachrichten (BNN; German for Baden's Latest News) is the only printed regional newspaper in the city and district of Karlsruhe. It also appears with local editions in the Rastatt district, Baden-Baden, in the Ortenaukreis, Pforzheim and in the Enzkreis. The paid circulation amounts to 112,419 copies, a reduction of 30.7 percent since 1998. Ninety editors work in the head and local editorial offices of the newspaper.

BNN belongs to a foundation named after the newspaper founder, Wilhelm Baur. The foundation seeks independence for the newspaper. The newspaper appears only on working days. On Sundays, the publisher distributes the free and similarly sized Der Sonntag with a circulation of about 230,000 copies to all households in Karlsruhe and its suburbs as well as to subscribers of the Mittelbadish local editions. Since 2013, BNN has distributed an app that includes an electronic version of the print edition as well as updates in the fields of politics, economics, sports and world affairs.

== History ==
Wilhelm Baur and Walter Schwerdtfeger were granted a license to publish a newspaper in Karlsruhe on 1 March 1946, by the Information Control Division of the American Occupation Forces. The first edition of the Badische Neueste Nachrichten was published on 4 March 1946. In 1950 Wilhelm Baur became the sole publisher of the BNN. After the death of his uncle Wilhelm Baur in 1973, Hans Wilhelm Baur (1926–2015) became publisher. A new administration building was built in 1986 in Neureut. Klaus Michael Baur became editor-in-chief in 2000. After the death of the publisher Brunhilde Baur in the fall of 2004, he was also editor and in December 2015, the newspaper announced that he had now also succeeded Hans Wilhelm Baur as publisher.

The Badische Neueste Nachrichten became known nationwide through the unveiling of the tax case of Peter Graf. On 12 July 1995, under the heading "Tax investigation at Steffi Graf's home," BNN disclosed the search warrant, which had been kept secret by the authorities until then. The search of the home had already taken place on 23 May immediately before the French Open.

== Editorial ==
The editorial department subscribes to the news agencies Deutsche Presse-Agentur (DPA), Sport-Informations-Dienst (SID) and Agence France-Presse (AFP). Collaboratively with other German daily newspapers, Badische Neuesten Nachrichten has a network of correspondents in Europe and around the world. Two correspondents report from the capital, Berlin, and the newspaper maintains a correspondent's office in Stuttgart. The newspaper appears on Mondays with two sports packages for worldwide or local sports. On Thursdays, a section provides event and activity tips for the upcoming weekend. On Saturdays, BNN includes two supplements: Fächer ("Topics") and Reise-Fächer ("Travel Matters").

In the city of Karlsruhe proper and the surrounding area, BNN has had a de facto monopoly on the local daily print market of newspapers for decades. Elsewhere in its distribution area, BNN competes with the local papers Pforzheimer Zeitung, Badisches Tagblatt, Rheinpfalz and with the Offenburger Tageblatt.
