= Bad Rotenfels =

- Stadtteil of Gaggenau
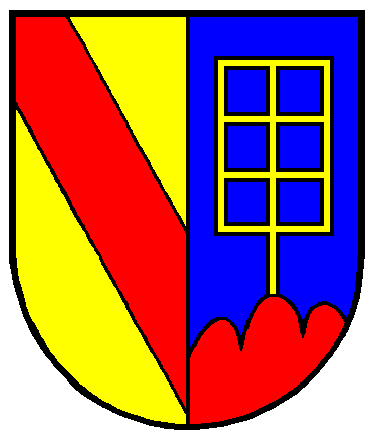
- Coat of arms
- Interactive map of Bad Rotenfels
- Location within Germany Location within Baden-Württemberg
- Coordinates: 48°48′14″N 08°19′10″E
- Country: Germany
- State: Baden-Württemberg
- District: Rastatt
- City: Gaggenau
- Founded: ca 1041 CE

Area
  - Total: 109.18 km^{2} (42.15 sq mi)
- Elevation: 160 m (520 ft)
- Time zone: UTC+01:00 (CET)
  - Summer (DST): UTC+02:00 (CEST)
- Website: www.bad-rotenfels.de

Bad Rotenfels is a district in the city of Gaggenau, Rastatt district, in Baden-Württemberg, Germany, some 8 km northeast of Baden-Baden.

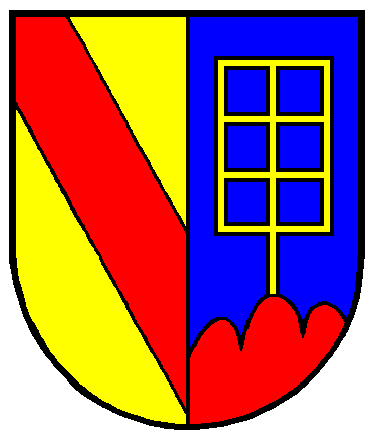
Coat of Arms (pre-1970)

== History ==
=== Origins in the Middle Ages ===
The township of Rotenfels was first mentioned in a royal transfer letter in 1041. In 1041, Count Heinrich von Calw, aka Emperor Henry III, ceded the Rotenfels estate along with other holdings to the Ufgau as free property as part of a larger transfer of property being made on the behalf of the marriage of his daughter Judit of Backnang-Sulichgau, Countess of Eberstein-Calw, to Hermann I, the Margrave of Verona.

In 1102, disputes arose over land owned by the Knights of Michelbach. Emperor Henry IV authorized the return of lost property, including the Rotenfels area, to the Cathedral Chapter of Speyer in a deed dated 15 February 1102. Hermann II and Graf von Eberstein, who dominated the Ufgau at the time, then enforced the deed in the region. Gaggenau and Rotenfels remained part of the Ufgau under the Diocese of Speyer for the next century and a half.

In 1112 Hermann II, son of Hermann I (d. 1074) began referring to himself as the Margrave of Baden, and from this time the separate history of Baden dates. Hermann appears to have called himself "Margrave" rather than "Count", because of the family connection to the Margrave of Verona. Hermann II's descendants, Hermann III, Hermann IV, and Herman V, added to their territories. Hermann III also served in the Second Crusade, Hermann IV served in the Third Crusade, and Hermann V served in the Fifth Crusade.

When Hermann IV died, Baden was divided, establishing the lines of Baden-Baden and Baden-Hachberg. About a century later, the Baden-Hachberg line was further divided into the Baden-Hachberg and Baden-Sausenberg lines.

The family of Baden-Baden was very successful in increasing the area of its holdings. Hermann VI served as Margrave from 1243 until his death in 1250; and through his marriage to the heiress Gertrude of Babenberg which had ruled Austria, laid some claim to the Duchy of Austria. His son and heir Frederick I was a year old at his father's death and so Baden passed into a regency by Hermann VI's brother Rudolf I. When Frederick I was executed at age 19 by Charles of Anjou in 1268, Rudolf I became the Margrave of Baden until his death in 1288. In 1283, Rudolf I succeeded in adding the area around Rotenfels and Gaggenau to his family's holdings.

When Rudolf I died, the rule of Baden was shared among his four sons: Hesso, Rudolf II, Hermann VII, and Rudolf III. By 1297, all except Rudolf III had died, but Hesso's son and heir, Rudolf Hesso, co-ruled with Rudolf III until Rudolf III's death in 1310. In 1320, Rudolf Hesso died, and the margraviate passed to Rudolf IV, who ruled until his death in 1348. His son Frederick III then took over until his death in 1353. Under Frederick's son, Rudolf VI, who ruled until 1372, all other family lines except the Sausenberg line had died out and reverted to him.

Rudolf's sons, Bernard I and Rudolf VII, concluded an inheritance contract in 1380 which again split Baden: Rudolf VII received the southern areas from Ettlingen to Baden-Baden, and Bernard received the northern areas around Dulach and Pforzheim. When Rudolf VII died in 1391, his lands reverted to Bernard. Bernard I's son Jacob became Margrave in 1431 until his death in 1453, at which time Baden passed into the hands of his sons Charles I and Bernard II. Bernard II later abdicated his ruling claims to serve in a monastery, and was later beatified by the Church; Charles I remained Margrave until his death in 1475.

=== The Protestant Reformation ===
During the 15th century, a war initiated and lost by Charles I with the Count Palatine of the Rhine cost him a substantial part of his territories, but these losses were later recovered and exceeded by his son and successor, Christopher I. In 1503 the Baden-Sausenberg line became extinct, and the whole of Baden was once again united under Christopher. At his death in 1527, it was divided once again among his three sons. One of these died childless in 1533, and in 1535 his remaining sons, Bernard and Ernest, having shared their brother's territories, made a fresh division and founded the lines of Baden-Baden and Baden-Pforzheim, called after 1565 Baden-Durlach. This division was enhanced by the Protestant Reformation, under which the Baden-Baden territory remained staunchly Catholic while the Baden-Durlach line became Evangelical (Lutheran).

Further divisions followed. The family strains eventually culminated in open warfare, and from 1584 to 1622 Baden-Baden was in the possession of one of the princes of Baden-Durlach.

The Catholic Baden-Baden line led by Bernhard controlled much of the area around the town of Baden-Baden and points south, and the Protestant Baden-Durlach line led by brother Ernest controlled much of the area around Karlruhe and Durlach and points north. Rotenfels and Gaggenau, as part of the Rastatt / Baden region, remained in the Catholic Baden-Baden territory during this family split.

=== 17th & 18th Centuries ===
The house remained divided through the period of continental slaughter between Catholics and Protestants known as the Thirty Years' War (1618–1648). Being located between most all of the warring factions, from Catholic France and Spain and Bavaria to Lutheran Prussia and Denmark and Calvinist Netherlands and Switzerland, Baden suffered severely during this struggle, and both branches of the family were exiled in turn.

A report to the Bishop of Speyer listed the population of Rotenfels and the nearby hamlet of Winkel in 1683 as "60 people and five Catholic families". During the reign of French King Louis XIV, the villages of Rotenfels and Gaggenau were almost completely destroyed by the French in a 'scorched-earth' campaign in 1691 during the Nine Years' War, aka the War of the Grand Alliance (1688–1697). One of the noted heroes of that war was Baden-Baden Margrave Ludwig "Turk Louis" Wilhelm, who played a part in routing Louis XIV's forces from the Rhineland and bringing the war to a close.

In 1701, the Rotenfels church records indicated that the population of Rotenfels, along with the nearby hamlet of Winkel, numbered 415 inhabitants, despite the ravages brought to the area by the French in the previous decade.

In 1707, Baden-Baden Margrave Ludwig "Turk Louis" Wilhelm died. His son, the crown prince Ludwig Georg Simpert von Baden (who eventually came to be known as "Hunter Louis", both for his love of hunting as well as a play off of his father's nickname), was only 5 at the time, so Baden-Baden was placed under the regency of his mother, Franziska Sibylla Augusta von Sachsen-Lauenburg until the young prince turned 25 in 1727. During this period, the regency was prosperous.

About 1725, the crown prince or his mother set up a small smelter and a steel mill in the Murg commons of the Rotenfels area. This experiment proceeded for about 20 years as the smelter and mill failed and changed hands a number of times until Rastatt glassmaker Franz Anton Dürr came and took over the facilities in 1753.

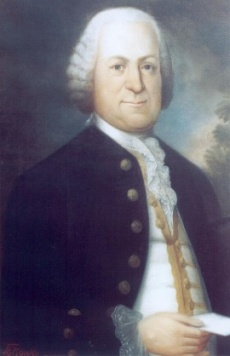
Anton Rindeschwender, founder of the Rindeschwender Glassworks in Gaggenau

The smelter and steel mill suffered primarily for two reasons: 1) A lack of an adequate supply of timber-fuel (the smelter required some 4,000 cords of wood each year to sustain its efforts, a demand which deforested the forest area around Rotenfels over the first two decades) and, perhaps more importantly, 2) A lack of a local supply of iron ore. Dürr solved both for the time being by importing fuel and ore from outside the Rotenfels area, and made a successful go at the business for about ten years. But ultimately, even the more remote sources began to peter out, and by the time that Ludwig George Simpert's successor, brother August Georg Simpert died in 1771 ("Hunter Louis" had died without a male heir in 1761), the business was again deeply in arrears with little hope of turnaround and was taken to foreclosure by its creditors. Dürr sold the business to other investors, who tried to make a go of it for another ten years without success. The ironworks were put up for sale again in 1779, but there were no buyers. Efforts continued to refinance the closed factory for another ten years.

With Georg August' death in 1771, the territories of Baden-Baden and Baden-Durlach were reunited under Baden-Durlach Margrave Karl Friedrich. In 1789, Karl Friedrich agreed to absorb all of the debts of the previous Baden-Baden margraviate. As part of that, he agreed to purchase the defaulted ironworks property from the previous owners, after which he had the entire plant with buildings and equipment demolished. In 1790, he turned over the property, which he called the "Rotenfels Smelter Estate," to his 2nd wife, Luise Karoline.

In 1772, Gaggenau became the home of the Rindeschwendersche glassworks and with it a number of operating homes and workshops. But while there were similar and multiple efforts to establish industries in Rotenfels during the late 18th and early 19th centuries, all of them eventually failed.

=== The French Revolution and Napoleon ===
When the French Revolution threatened to be exported throughout Europe in 1792, Baden joined forces against France, and Rotenfels and its local hills were center-stage in many of the campaigns. With French successes in the first few years, the Margrave of Baden was compelled to pay an indemnity and to cede his territories on the left bank of the Rhine to France.

However, in 1796, fortunes changed. Back in the time of the 30 Years' War (1618–1648), several military fortifications were built in the "Großen und Kleinen Schanzenberg" ("Great and Small Mountain Redoubt") hills across from Rotenfels. These came into play in June 1796, when the Austrian "Imperial" of 16,000 men led by General Latour retreated into the Murg Valley to bolster their defense against a battalion of 56,000 French soldiers. Their retrenchment allowed them, as well as other "Imperial" forces in nearby communities of Kuppenheim and Bischweier, to bottle up the French troops in the Murg Valley. Realizing no hope of victory in that circumstance, the French retreated, but in so doing launched a "scorched-earth" policy through the area, including the towns of Rotenfels, Gernsbach, Ebersteinburg and Selbach. Residents fled with their cattle and whatever other possessions they could muster into the forests of Oberweier. Included in the devastation was the destruction of the historic Rotenfels "Solitude" house, built in the 17th century, at the foot of the mountain redoubt.

By early July, the French force in the Murg Valley had dwindled to 36,000 men. On July 9, 1796, Reich Marshall Archduke Karl led 45,000 Austrians into battle, driving the French back to France. The French again launched a "scorched-earth" policy in their retreat, this time devastating Karlsruhe and forcing the Margrave of Baden to flee his capital until the French fully vacated.

The Margrave's fortunes soon changed again. France's Napoleon Bonaparte effected a coup of the French Republic in late 1799 and took over control of the government. By 1803, Napoleon was looking to build alliances and allies, and largely owing to the good offices of Alexander I, Emperor of Russia, to whom Karl Frederick was related by marriage, the Margrave received the bishopric of Konstanz, part of the Rhenish Palatinate, and other smaller districts, together with the dignity of a prince-elector. When war between France and Germany broke out again in 1805, this time he fought for Napoleon, with the result that by the Peace of Pressburg signed in that year, he obtained the Breisgau and other territories at the expense of the Habsburgs. In 1806 he joined Napoleon's new Confederation of the Rhine, not only receiving other additions of territory, but also declaring himself a sovereign prince and taking the title of Grand Duke.

The Baden contingent continued to assist France, and by the Peace of Vienna in 1809 the new Grand Duke of Baden was rewarded with accessions of territory at the expense of the kingdom of Württemberg. With Napoleon's support, Karl Friedrich had expanded Baden from 3,600 square kilometers with about 175,000 inhabitants in 1803 to 15,000 square kilometers and almost a million inhabitants.

=== The Rotenfels Stoneworks Factory ===
In 1801, the Countess of Baden, Luise Karoline, decided to establish and porcelain stoneware factory at the site of the ill-fated smelterworks of the prior century.

Since becoming Karl Friedrich's wife, the Countess Luise Karoline was controversial. She was a daughter of the governor and chamber of "King" Henry Geyser of Geyersburg, a minor noble; and had served as a Lady-In-Waiting in the court of Baden princess Amalie von Baden for 15 years and then 2 years as a Lady of the Court before she married the 60-year-old widow Margrave at the age of 19 in 1787. But due to her family's "lower" status, the marriage was morganatic – which meant that her children would not be recognized as eligible to accede to the Margrave's (later Grand Duke's) throne.

By the time of the Congress of Vienna in 1809, after Karl's first son Karl Louis had died in 1801 and Karl Frederick, already in ill health, realized that the only feasible successors would be from his second marriage, he began efforts to grant them the right of succession. Although Karl Frederich died in 1811, his grandson Charles continued the efforts and won those rights with the adoption of a new Baden constitution in 1817.

Although quite pretty, the Margrave's new wife was not well-regarded. Besides being perceived in her "inferior" royal status, she was seen as unduly brash and ambitious. Part of that derived from her efforts to seek succession eligibility for her children; but she was also very active in funding favored projects in the Kingdom. Even Napoleon noted: "If her intrigues do not bring an end to her shameless and depraved life, they should lock her in a monastery".

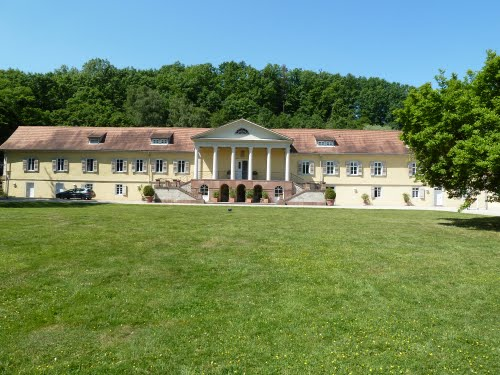
The Rotenfels Castle, which today serves as a private academy and Fine Arts school

In the late 18th century, porcelain plates and bottles from China became outrageously popular among the European elite, and diligent efforts were made in Europe to duplicate the technology. Rotenfels turned out to have a suitable clay deposit in its vicinity for porcelain making, and in 1793, several Protestant "stonecrafters" from the French province of Alsace relocated to Rotenfels and established a small stoneware (porcelain) factory on the old Rotenfels smelter factory now owned by the Countess Luise Karoline. By the end of the 18th century, they were generating annual gross proceeds of some 6,400 guilders in their business – enough for the Countess to take notice and to decide to take over the industry into her own manufacturing operations. The Margrave granted a 5-year monopoly to the business and, with 4,000 guilders, the Countess set up her operations. The new facility was up and in operation by 1803. Production was similar to the English "Wedgewood" stoneware and bore the embossed Hochberg family coat of arms as its logo.

After the successful development of a safer lead-free glaze in 1804 / 1805, the business expanded into kitchenware and the Countess expanded the workshop in 1806 / 1807.

Although the business thrived under the 5-year monopoly, it began to suffer when that monopoly expired against the import of similar goods from Alsace. The business also suffered from the depletion of the local forest, which required the import of fuelwood and driving manufacturing costs up. By 1811, after Karl Fredrick died, the Countess put the business on the sales block at fire-sale prices. A buyer was interested, but the rest of the family objected to the terms and cancelled the sale. The business continued to struggle until 1816 when Margrave William von Baden, son of Karl Frederich and Luis Karoline and who had purchased the business from his mother's estate, felt compelled to shut down the business due to its ongoing losses. Over the next ten years, he converted the factory building into a country house, what is today known as Schloß Rotenfels (German: Rotenfels Castle). At the same time, he turned the grounds into a model organic farm based on scientific techniques, the operations of which continue to this day.

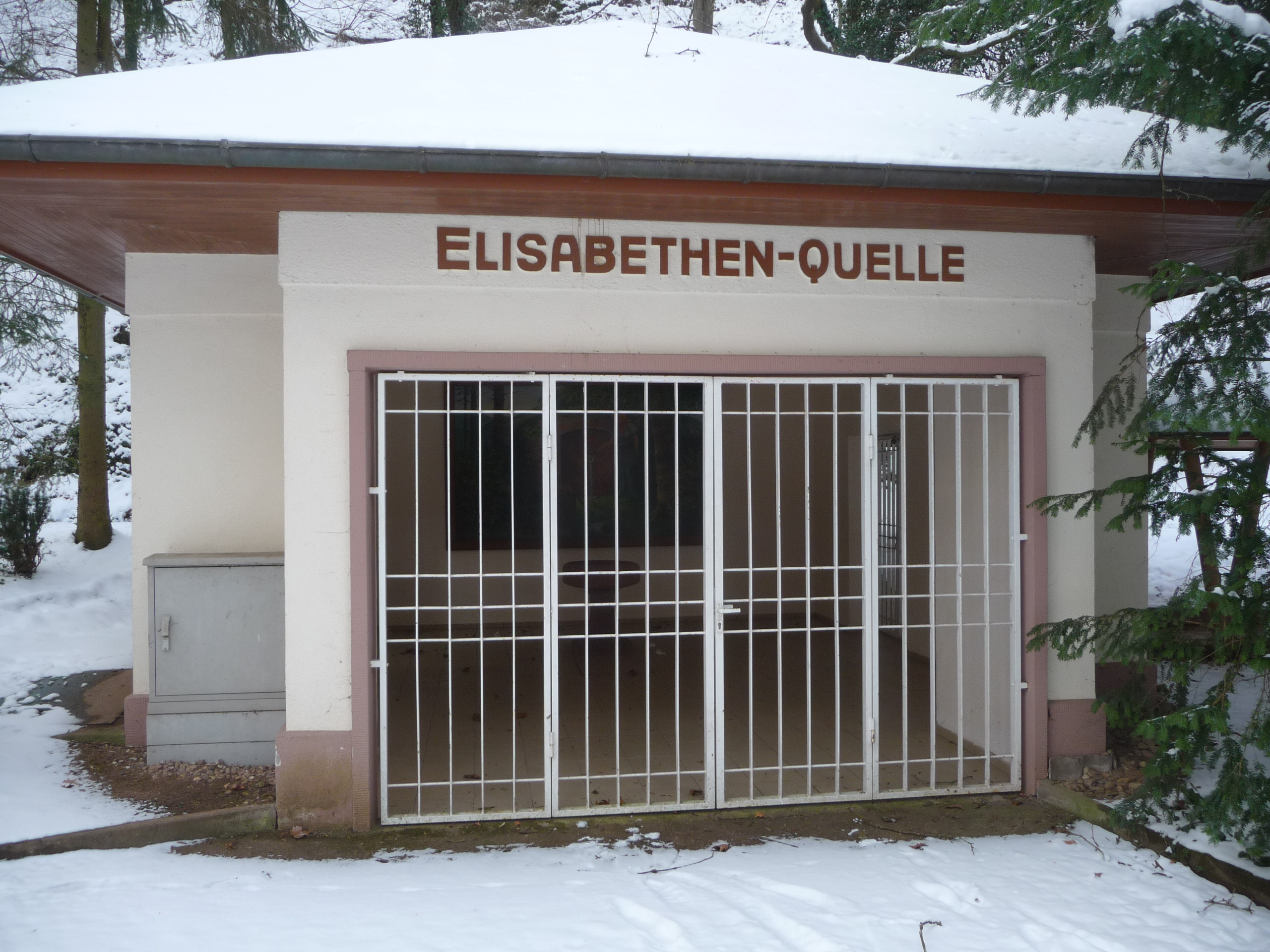
The ElizabethenQuelle Site & Memorial

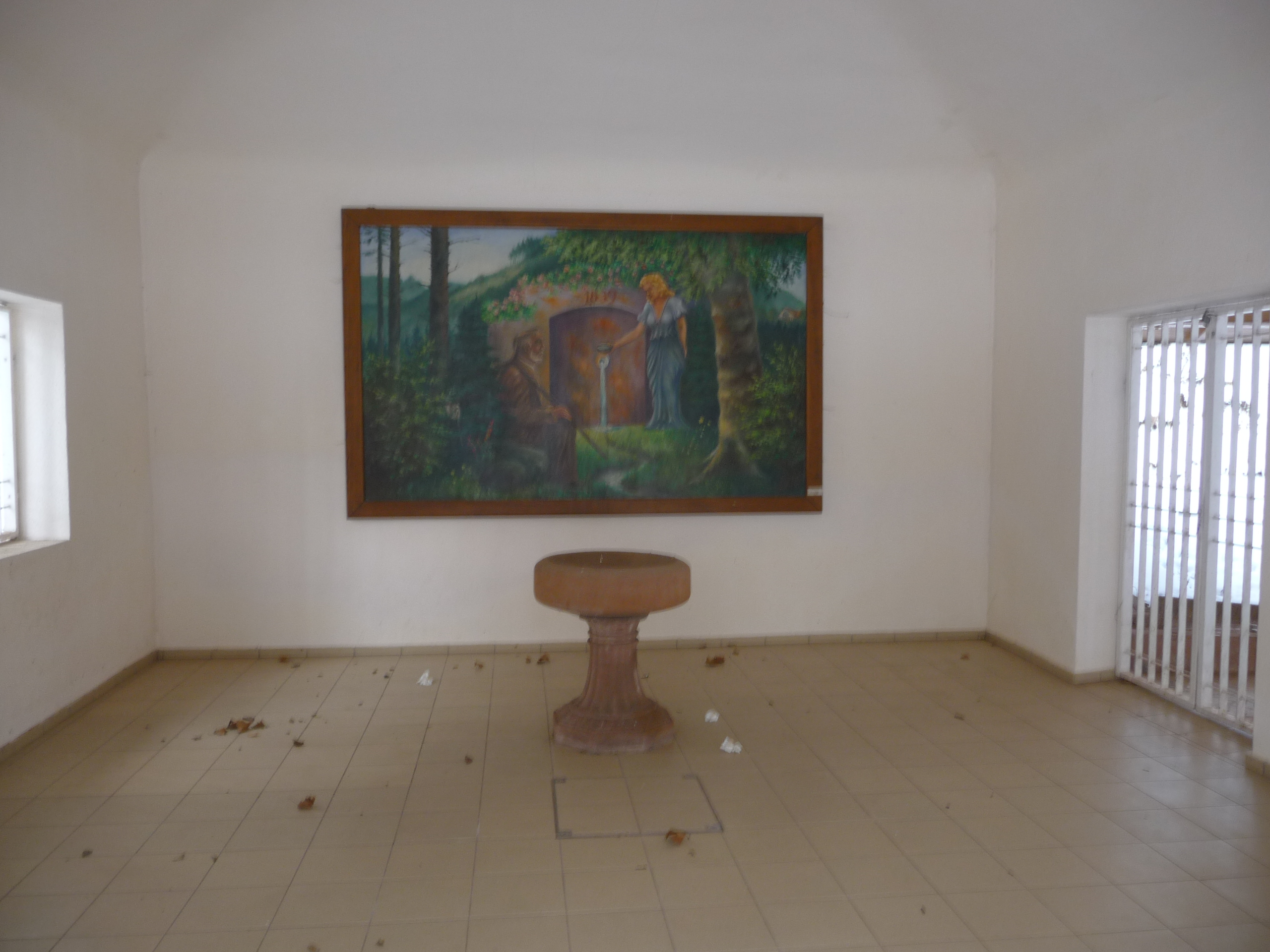
Inside the ElizabethenQuelle Memorial

In 1996, the Rotenfels Castle Academy was established at Schloß Rotenfels, which also includes the Baden-Württemberg Academy of Fine Arts school, school and amateur theater.

A new development for the Rotenfels community began in 1839 with Margrave William, who resided each summer in his newly built castle in Rotenfels. Ever the entrepreneur, he began drilling at the foot of the mountain redoubt for possible coal deposits. Although that effort failed, it opened up a thermal mineral spring. Margrave William named the spring "ElizabethenQuelle" (German: Elizabeth's Source) after his youngest daughter, Elizabeth, and proceeded to turn the spring into a local health spa. He also renamed the town "Bad Rotenfels" (German: Rotenfels Baths) at this time to help promote the town and spa.

=== The 20th Century; Absorption into Gaggenau ===
The next century saw many changes in Germany, from the Revolution of 1848, to the rise of the German Empire in 1870, World War I & II, the post-war occupation and partitioning of Germany, and eventual reunification of West Germany in 1952 and East Germany in 1989.

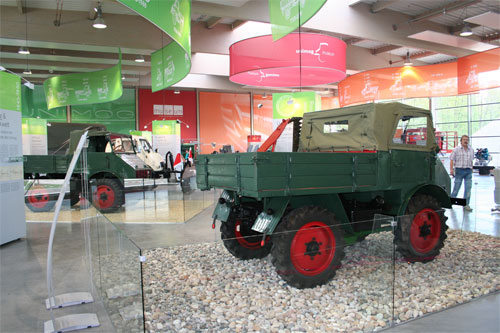
A display in the Unimog Museum, Rotenfels

Memorial plaque of the Nazi detention camp in Rotenfels.

In 1873, an Ironworks factory was established in the nearby town of Gaggenau. In 1895 the factory built the 5-hp automobile Orient Express and entered the new industry of automobile manufacture. In 1905 they renamed themselves the Gaggenau South German Automobile Factory GmbH. In 1907 the company was taken over by the company Benz & Cie of Mannheim until the merger of Daimler-Benz AG in 1926. Rotenfels became a bedroom community for the automobile factories.

Daimler-Benz eventually made Rotenfels the manufacturing base for their Unimog line of industrial trucks. Rotenfels is the home of the Unimog Museum, a private museum owned by Daimler-Benz which documents the history and evolution of the Unimog truck line.

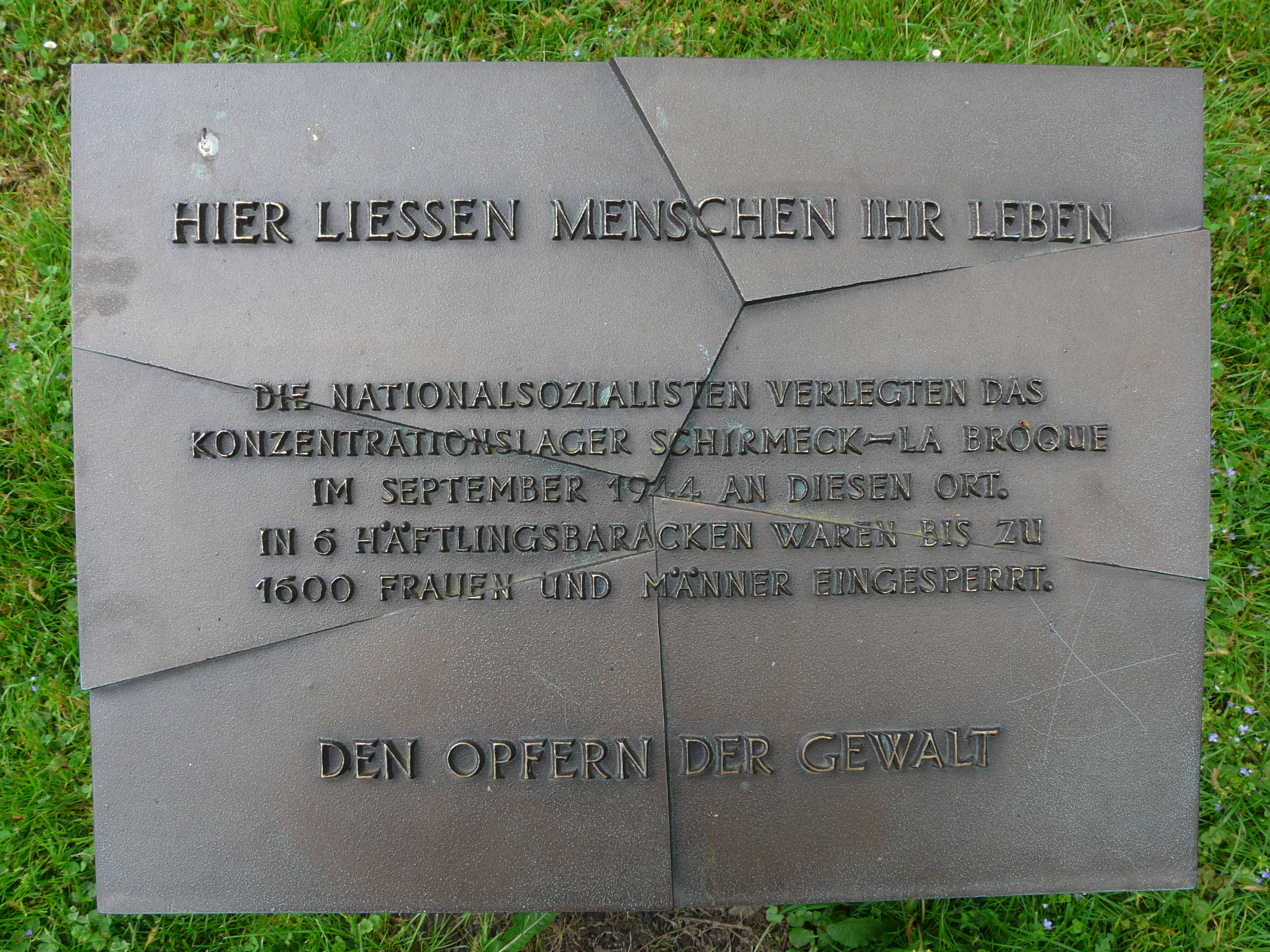
Closeup of Memorial plaque

After World War I, the Grand Duke of Baden was forced out during the German Revolution of 1918-1919, and Baden declared itself a "Free Republic", with its own constitution, parliament, and president. It retained that status until the rise of the Nazis and the abolishment of German states in the 1933 German declarations.

In September 1944, the Nazis built a detention camp in the town of Bad Rotenfels. Six barracks were built to house about 1,600 men and women, mostly French prisoners, who were used as forced labor in the Daimler-Benz plants nearby. About 500 of them were killed. A memorial plaque has been placed in the meadow where the barracks were located, across from the Rotenfels spa. Another memorial was placed in the Bad Rotenfels cemetery commemorating the murder of 27 of those prisoners by their Nazi captors.

In the late 1960s, in response to an effort to aggregate and consolidate municipal governments into districts of 20,000 or more, the state government of Baden-Württemberg approved a petition by the town of Gaggenau to annex six of its surrounding communities, including the municipality of Bad Rotenfels and the large swath of forest that ran along the Murg River between the two municipalities. Bad Rotenfels and its smaller hamlet of Winkel became a district of the city of Gaggenau in January 1970.

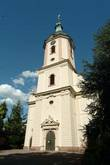
St. Lawrence Parish Church, in Bad Rotenfels Burough, City of Gaggenau

== Religion ==
Rotenfels belonged to the Diocese of Speyer and was assigned to the Kuppenheim District under that Diocese in the Middle Ages. The Reformation arrived in 1555, and over the next three and a half centuries, as the area came under the authority of various rulers with differing religious preferences, the majority denomination of Rotenfels changed six times between Catholic and Evangelical Lutheran (Protestant) before finally settling to become a Catholic majority.

St. Sebastian Chapel, at the Winkel turnoff in Bad Rotenfels Burough, City of Gaggenau

Until 1891, the only Catholic parish church for the entire region was the St. Lawrence parish church in Rotenfels. The present church dates from the Baroque era in the 17th century, with the interior dating from the 18th century. At the turnoff in Rotenfels to the hamlet of Winkel, the tiny one-room St. Sebastian chapel was built from 1747 to 1752 with an open porch and roof turret. (It remains an active chapel today.) All of the area parishes came under the newly founded Archdiocese of Freiburg in 1821/1827 and assigned to the Murgtal Office of the Dean.

The Evangelical Lutherans (Protestants) were driven out of the area in the 18th century but moved back in again to the Rotenfels area in the 19th century. They formed their own community and built their own church in 1891. This church was destroyed in the Second World War but rebuilt in 1953. The community, including all of the Protestants in the modern districts of Gaggenau and in Rastatt, belong to the Evangelical Church District of Baden-Baden.

== Sites ==
In 1818 Margrave Wilhelm of Baden and his 2nd wife Luise Karoline) turned the former site of Rotenfels spa into a country chateau. From 1818 to 1827, the building was redesigned by Friedrich Weinbrenner in classical portico style. It remained a country residence until the 1970s, when the academy purchased the building for its use.

Bad Rotenfels includes a large park on the south side of the river against the forest which hosts a number of significant historical ruins and hot springs, including military fortifications dating back to the 16th century, as well as a memorial to a Nazi labor camp where some 1,600 prisoners were housed and used for forced labor. The park includes outdoor sports facilities, hiking trails, a beer garden, mini-golf, and marked nature paths with historical markers.
