= Onset of Putrefaction =

Studio album by Necrophagist
- Released: September 14, 1999
- Recorded: August 1998 – April 1999
- Genres: Technical death metal; brutal death metal
- Length: 35:51
- Labels: Noise Solution (original); Willowtip (reissue)
- Producer: Muhammed Suiçmez

Necrophagist chronology
Onset of Putrefaction (1999)	Epitaph (2004)

2004 re-issue cover

Onset of Putrefaction is the debut album by German technical death metal band Necrophagist. It was recorded almost solely by the band's founder, guitarist and vocalist Muhammed Suiçmez, who recorded all the vocal and guitar tracks, and programmed most of the drum and bass tracks with some help from Jochen Bittmann and Bjoern Vollmer.

== Background ==
=== Release and 2004 re-release ===
The original 1999 version of the album was very difficult to obtain due to distribution problems with French label Noise Solution Records who owned the rights to its music and pressed only 1,000 copies. American label Willowtip Records' founder Jason Tipton described the situation in an interview:

I first heard Onset in 2000. I started emailing Muhammed, asking about releasing it in the US, and Muhammed always wanted it to happen, but things were a complete mess. He had signed a really bad contract and his label had gone out of business and the rights to that album were sold to another company. So this company owned the rights to the CD and they were near impossible for anyone to deal with. In fact they weren't doing their job at all. They didn't really care at all about the Band and didn't have the CD in press. It was a complete mess.

Despite the hardships of the situation, Willowtip eventually successfully re-released Onset of Putrefaction. The re-release version of the album features new cover art as well as a complete re-mix of all its songs as well as new resampled drum machine tracks. The vastly improved drum samples used by the drum machine were recorded and programmed by drummer Hannes Grossmann.

== Track listing ==
All songs written by Muhammed Suiçmez.

No.	Title	Length
1.	"Foul Body Autopsy"	1:55
2.	"To Breathe in a Casket"	5:43
3.	"Mutilate the Stillborn"	3:45
4.	"Intestinal Incubation"	4:13
5.	"Culinary Hyperversity"	5:06
6.	"Advanced Corpse Tumor"	5:29
7.	"Extreme Unction"	4:48
8.	"Fermented Offal Discharge"	4:42
Total length:		35:51

2004 re-issue bonus tracks

No.	Title	Length
9.	"Dismembered Self-Immolation" (Demo '95)	3:58
10.	"Pseudopathological Vivisection" (Demo '95)	2:38
Total length:		42:06

== Reception ==
Professional ratings
Review scores
Source	Rating
AllMusic	5/5 stars

== Personnel ==
Necrophagist

- Muhammed Suiçmez – vocals, guitars, bass guitar, drum programming
- Jochen Bittmann – additional bass guitar
- Bjoern Vollmer – guitar solo on "Extreme Unction"
- Hannes Grossmann - additional drum programming (2004 re-release)

Production

- Muhammed Suiçmez – producer
