= Pforzheimer Zeitung =

German newspaper in Baden-Württemberg,

- Type: Daily newspaper
- Founded: 1949
- Website: www.pz-news.de

Pforzheimer Zeitung (German pronunciation: [ˈpfɔʁtshaɪmɐ ˈtsaɪtʊŋ]; transl. "Pforzheim Newspaper") is an independent local subscription newspaper with seat in Pforzheim, which is mainly distributed and read in the city of Pforzheim and the surrounding Enz district. Its language of publication is German and it appears daily, from Monday to Saturday. It features in-depth coverage of news on Pforzheim and the surrounding region, and reports on major national and international events. News topics are politics, economy, social issues, and sports. The newspaper has the largest circulation in the region with more than 100,000 copies per day. It has an editorial office in Mühlacker and publishes special local versions for the Mühlacker and Northern Black Forest regions.

The Pforzheimer Zeitung was founded in October 1949 by Jakob Esslinger, who had been operating in Pforzheim as a printer and newspaper publisher since 1928. His earlier newspaper was the daily "Pforzheimer Rundschau", a newspaper with a long tradition, which he took over in 1928 and published until March 1, 1943, when it was shut down by the Nazi regime citing "lack of paper" as the reason. But this reason was only a pretense, given the independence of the paper in times when the Nazi regime was aiming at total control of the media. The PZ was founded in economically difficult times after the end of World War II and in a town that to a large extent had been destroyed by an area bombardment.

The bombing raid had destroyed all printing presses of Esslinger's company. Pforzheimer Zeitung is registered under the company name "J. Esslinger GmbH & Co. KG" and is led by the publisher Albert Esslinger-Kiefer (2006).

The Pforzheimer Zeitung operates its own printing shop in the center of Pforzheim and nowadays is one of the most modern and productive independent newspapers in Germany. It utilizes modern techniques such as electronic text and image processing, digital photography, computer-to-plate technology, high-quality four-color printing, and large rotary printing presses which can print up to 35,000 copies per hour. PZ has established its own internet homepage where it offers a news summary free of charge.

In 2006, PZ had around 150 employees, of which 37 belonged to the editorial staff. At that point, PZ earned roughly 70% of its revenue from advertising and the remaining 30% from subscriptions.
