= St. Wendelin's Chapel =

Church building in Freiburg, Germany

Coordinates: 47°59′58″N 7°54′19″E

The small St. Wendelin's Chapel is located about 750 metres east of St. Odile above the Musbach valley, Germany, on the Small Roßkopf, a spur of the Roßkopf, at a height of 540 m. It belongs to the parish of St. Hilarius in Freiburg's suburb Ebnet. It is named after Saint Wendelin, a king's son who lived as a shepherd and hermit. Wendelin is the patron saint of shepherds and flocks. According to the documents of the Capuchins the first chapel was built of wood in 1723 and served the herdsmen from Ebnet also as a protection against storms. Pilgrims who went from Freiburg over the Roßkopf to St. Peter used this chapel as a shelter and for devotion. The present stone chapel was funded and built by the citizens of Ebnet in 1895. Even today it is maintained from Ebnet.

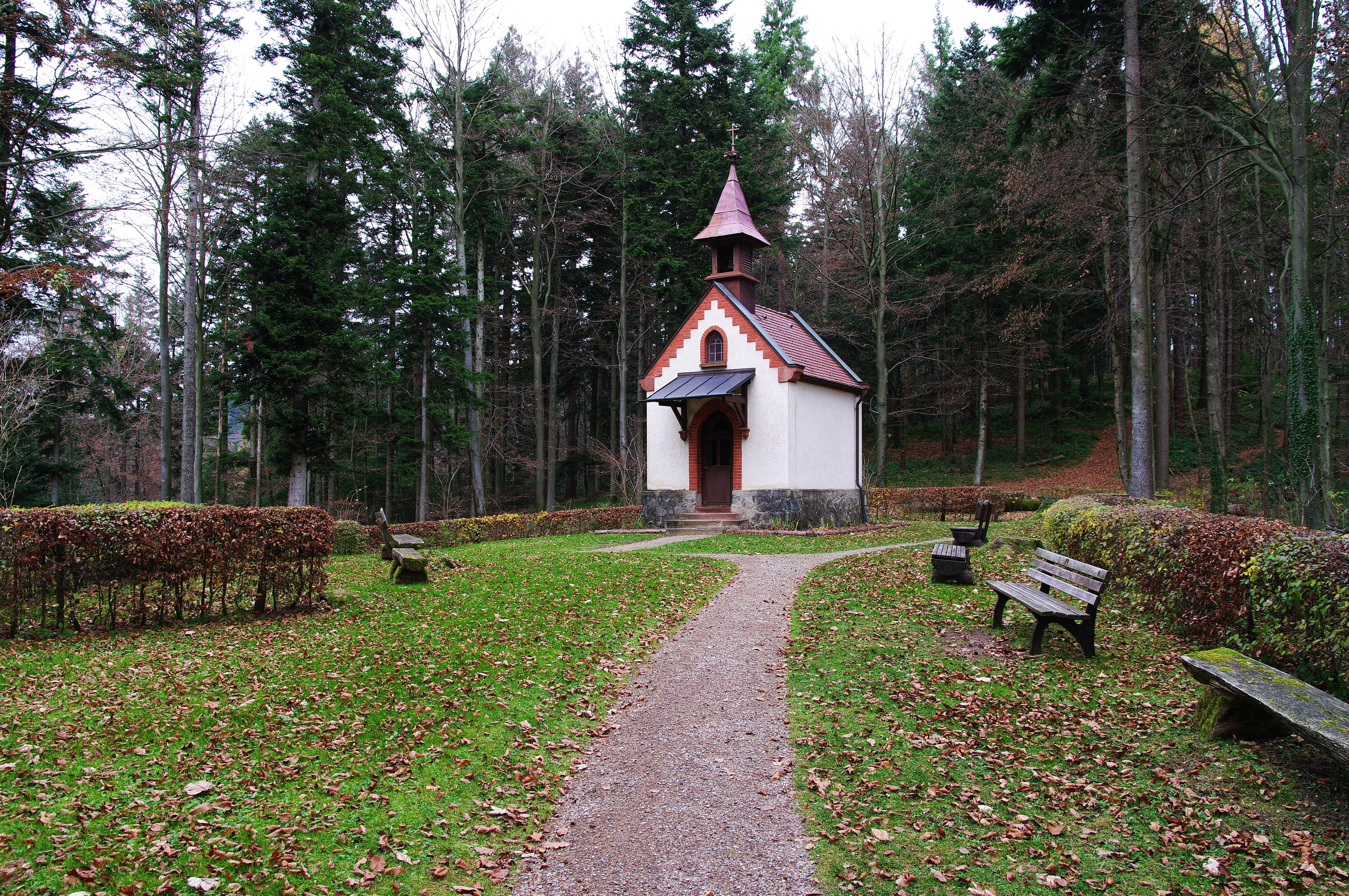
The isolated location of the chapel

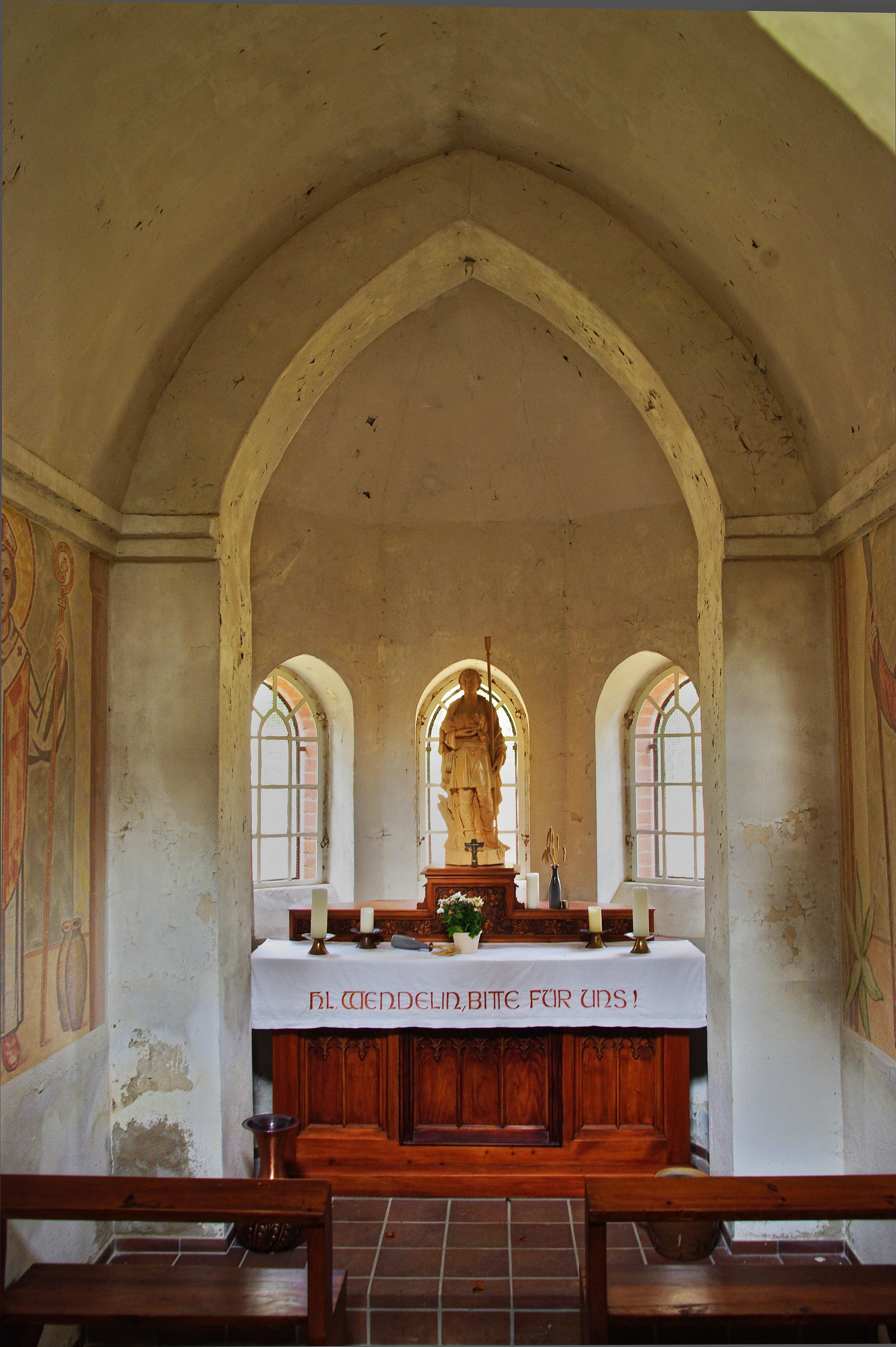
The altar

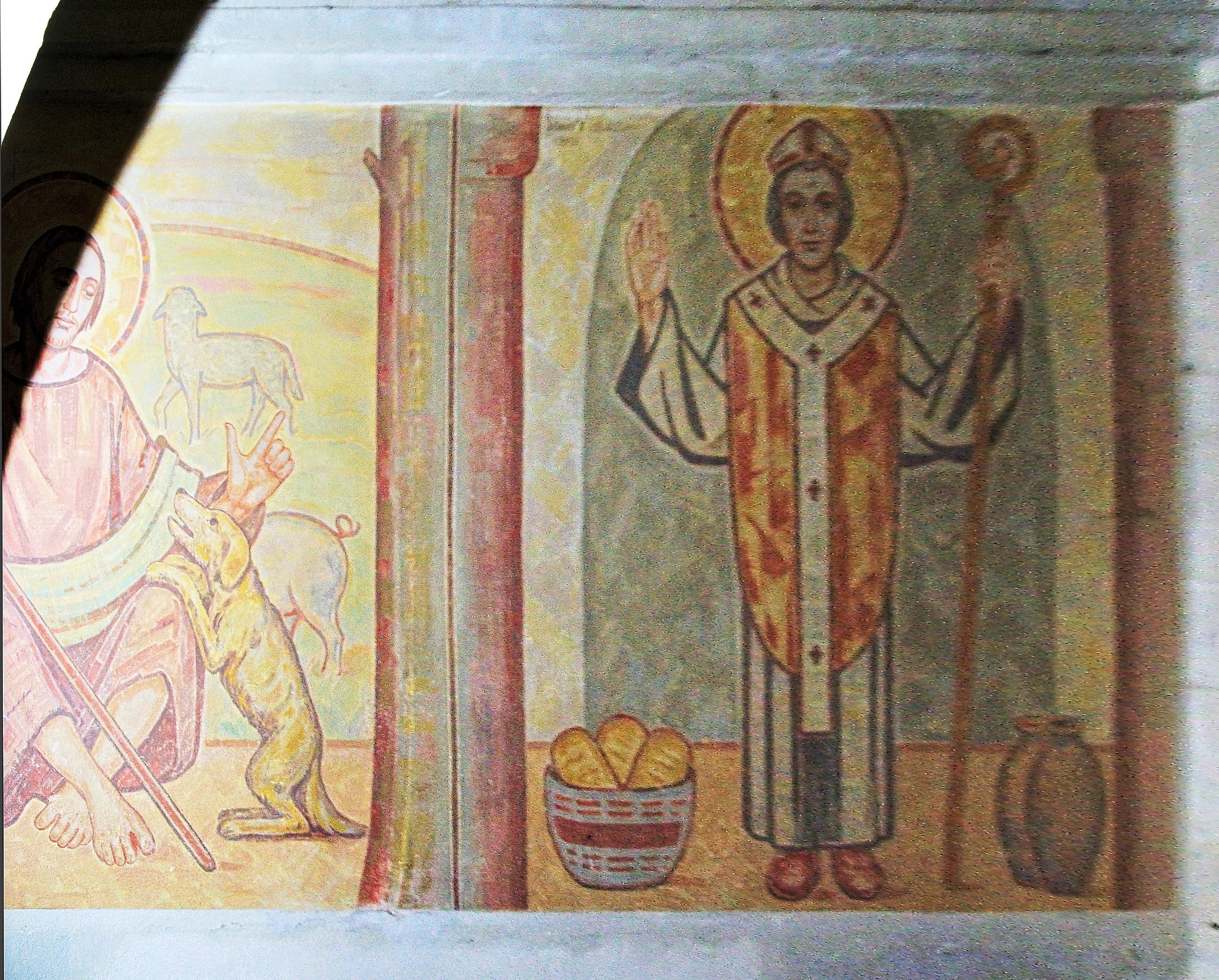
Paintings to the left

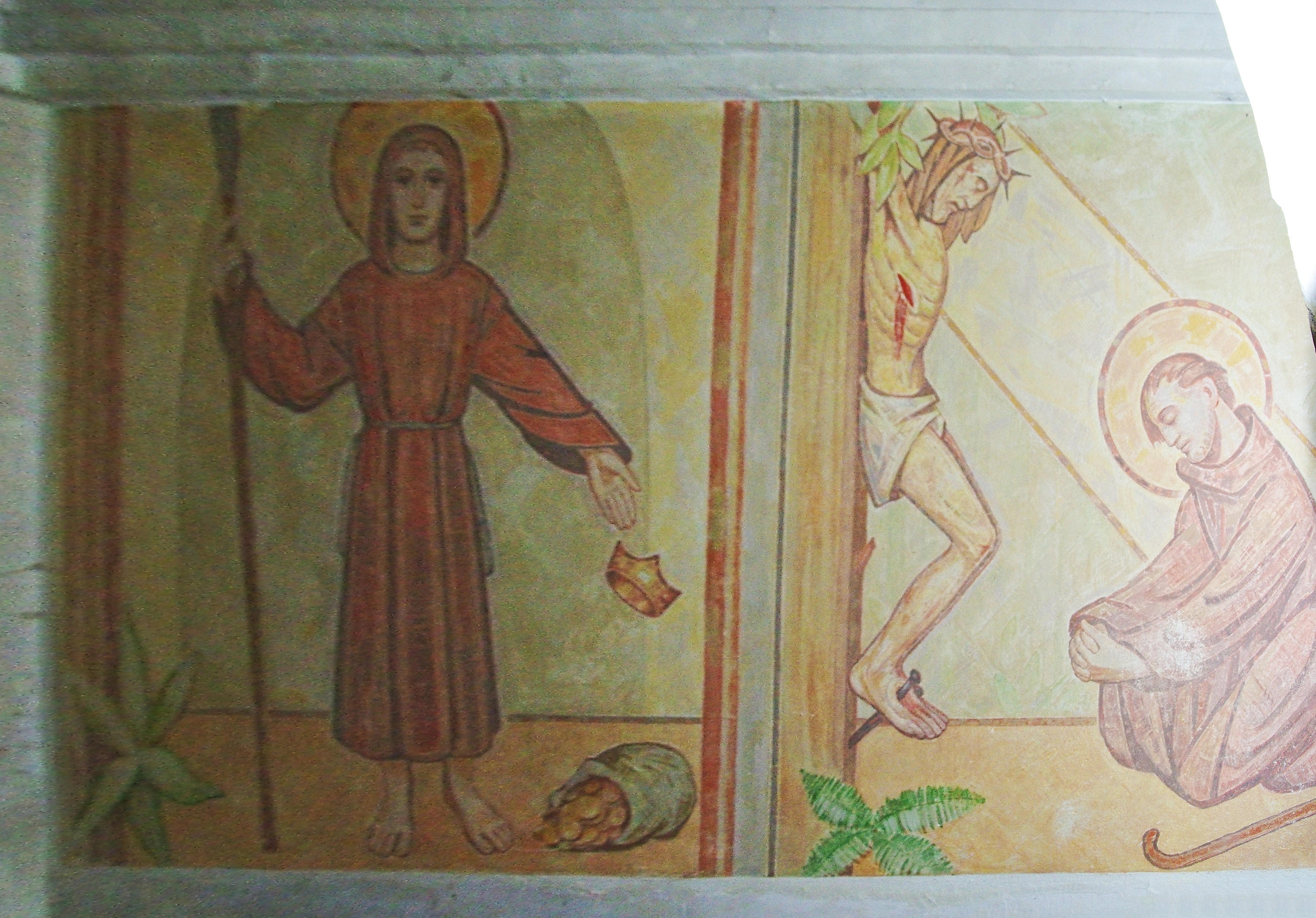
Paintings to the right
