= Necrophagist =

German technical death metal band

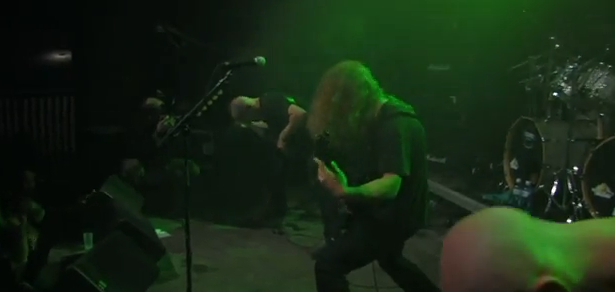
- Necrophagist performing in 2010. Left to right: Stephan Fimmers, Muhammed Suiçmez, Romain Goulon (behind) and Sami Raatikainen.

Background information
- Origin: Gaggenau, Germany
- Genre: Technical death metal
- Years active: 1992–2010
- Labels: Relapse; Willowtip
- Past members: (See below)
- Website: necrophagist.de

Necrophagist (/nɛkroʊˈfæɡɪst/ nek-roh-FA-gist) was a German technical death metal band that guitarist and vocalist Muhammed Suiçmez founded and fronted. The band used baroque music-influenced compositions and extreme metal drumming.

== History ==
=== 1999–2004: Onset of Putrefaction and Epitaph ===
Necrophagist's debut album, Onset of Putrefaction, has been out of print for years. A drum machine handled the percussion on the album . A new edition with drum samples recorded by Hannes Grossmann was created. All the old guitar, bass guitar and vocal tracks were mixed with the new drum samples. The re-release features two songs from Necrophagist's 1995 self-titled demo tape. Producer Christoph Brandes engineered the album at The Iguana Studios. Bob Katz mastered it at "Digital Domain", Orlando, Florida. Willowtip issued the re-release in 2004 in the United States/Canada and Relapse in the rest of the world. In August 2001, Necrophagist performed at the Brutal Assault open air festival in the Czech Republic. The band returned to perform in 2003, 2005, and 2010.

=== 2004–2008: Touring and continued lineup changes ===
On 10 February 2006, it was announced that Christian Münzner had departed the band due to scheduling conflicts. He was replaced with Finnish guitarist Sami Raatikainen, who also plays in the band Codeon.

In 2006, the band undertook an American tour called "Carving North America's Epitaph". Necrophagist was joined on this tour by Arsis, Alarum, Neuraxis, Ion Dissonance, Cattle Decapitation and Thine Eyes Bleed. They and Dying Fetus supported Cannibal Corpse on their U.S. tour in the fall, which included some Canadian venues.

In 2007, the band announced on its Myspace profile that after the 2007 California Metalfest, drummer Hannes Grossmann would leave the band. Hannes stated that he was unable to commit to the band's full-time touring schedule. Marco Minnemann was Hannes's official permanent replacement.

Necrophagist headlined The Summer Slaughter Tour in 2007, which featured other extreme metal bands, including Decapitated, Arsis, The Faceless, Cephalic Carnage, As Blood Runs Black and Cattle Decapitation.

In April 2008, Necrophagist announced that drummer Romain Goulon would join the band to replace Minnemann, who would still work with Suiçmez on a side project.

Necrophagist played in the "Pillage the Village Tour" in 2008 from 26 August 2008 to 10 September 2008 with death metal bands Dying Fetus and Beneath the Massacre. Shows in some areas included Carcass, Suffocation, 1349 and Aborted.

=== 2008–present: Hiatus ===
In 2008, Necrophagist began work on its next album with new drummer Romain Goulon. According to rumours, two possible names were "The Path to Naught" and "Death to the Faithful". Suiçmez stated that the band would use seven-string guitars on the album. Muhammed recorded with a custom shop Ibanez Xiphos guitar with seven strings and 27 frets. Sami Raatikainen is an Ibanez guitar endorser, using a seven-string RG-Series guitar on stage.

On 11 September 2013, Goulon issued a statement that Necrophagist were still active and attempting to record a new album, but there was no indication as to when it would be released. On 4 April 2016, Goulon replied to a Facebook comment and confirmed the end of the band, stating, "we're looking for a coffin to mourn the death".

In 2019, a fan asked Suiçmez about the third album, Suiçmez said it was recorded on a hard drive somewhere, but that he didn't have the motivation to reform the band.

== Members ==
Final lineup

- Muhammed Suiçmez – vocals, guitar (1992–2010)
- Stephan Fimmers – bass (2003–2010)
- Sami Raatikainen – guitar (2006–2010)
- Romain Goulon – drums (2008–2010)

Former members

- Jochen Bittmann – bass (1992–2001)
- Jan-Paul Herm – guitar (1992–1995)
- Matthias Holzapfel – guitar (1995–2000)
- Raphael Kempermann – drums (1992–1995)
- Daniel Silva – drums (1995–1998, 2001–2003)
- Shahram Naderi – drums (1998–2001)
- Mostafa Karami – guitar (1998–2001)
- Mario Petrovic – guitar (2000–2001)
- Slavek Foltyn – drums (2000–2001)
- Björn Vollmer – guitar (2001–2002)
- Julien Laroche – bass (2001–2003)
- Christian Münzner – guitar (2002–2006)
- Heiko Linzert – bass (2003)
- Hannes Grossmann – drums (2003–2007)
- Marco Minnemann – drums (2007–2008)

== Discography ==
Studio albums

- Onset of Putrefaction (1999)
- Epitaph (2004)

Demo tapes

- Requiems of Festered Gore (1992)
- Necrophagist (1995)
