= Sami Raatikainen =

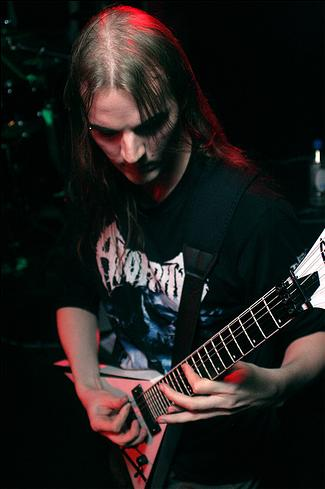
- Raatikainen performing live in 2006

Background information
- Origin: Finland
- Genres: Technical death metal
- Occupation: Guitarist
- Instrument: Guitar
- Years active: 2006–present
- Labels: Relapse
- Member of: Codeon
- Formerly of: Necrophagist
- Website: www.radiance.fi

Sami Raatikainen is a Finnish guitarist who played for the German technical death metal band Necrophagist. He joined Necrophagist in 2006 after the departure of Christian Müenzner. He also plays guitar in the Finnish technical death metal band Codeon and performs guitar, bass, keyboard and drums for his solo project Radiance.

== Radiance ==
During Necrophagist's extended downtime Sami spent his time recording and producing a solo album called "The Burning Sun" under the project name Radiance. The entire album was written by Sami, including the vocals and lyrics, though Mats Levén recorded the vocals.

Sami also studies theoretical physics at the University of Helsinki in Finland as a PhD candidate with a master's degree.
