= Possessed (band) =

American death metal band

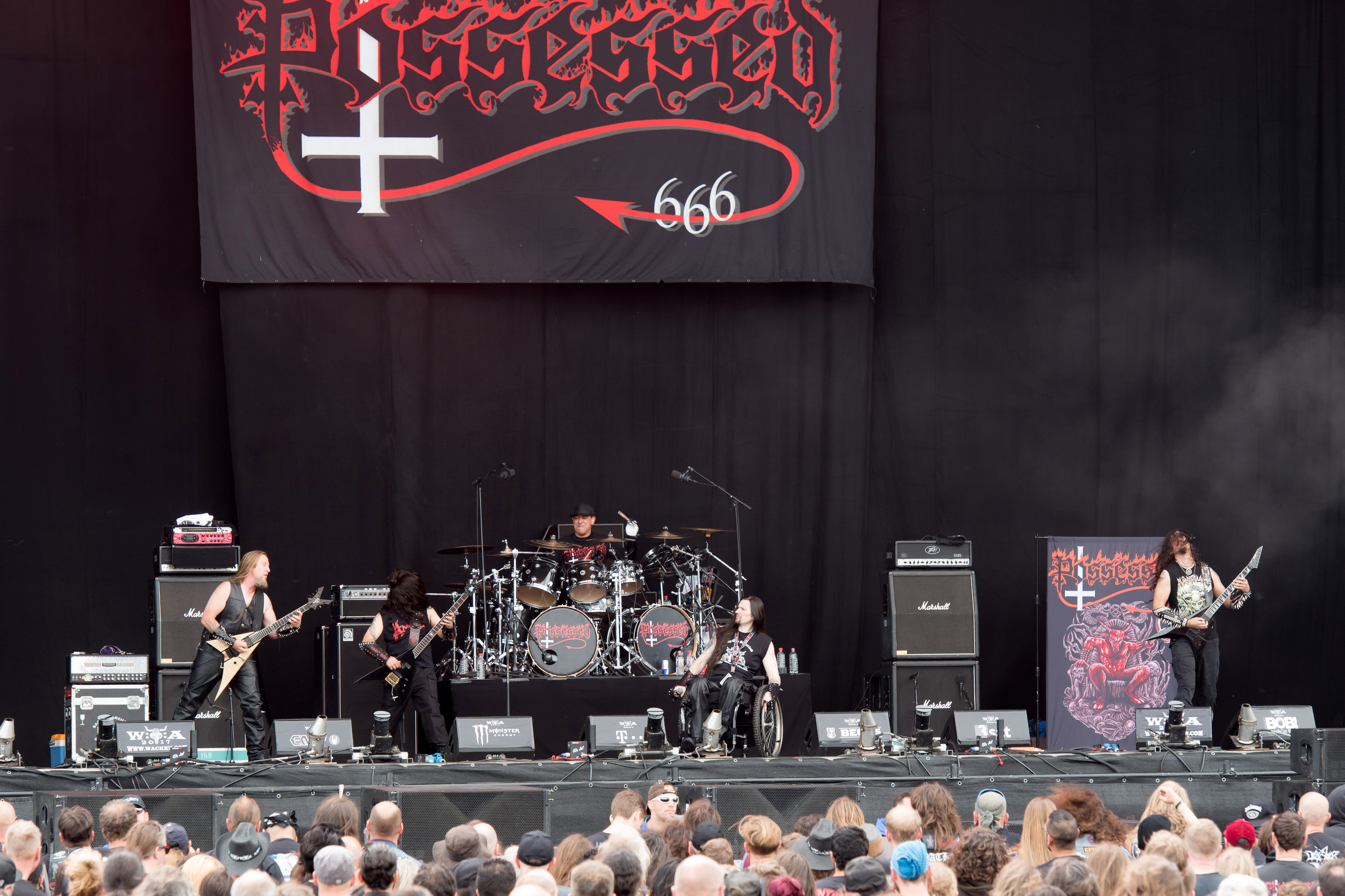
- Possessed in 2017

Background information
- Origin: San Francisco Bay Area, California, U.S.
- Genres: Death metal; thrash metal
- Years active: 1982–1987; 1990–1993; 2007–present
- Labels: Combat; Relativity; Under One Flag; Agonia; Roadrunner; Nuclear Blast
- Members: Jeff Becerra; Daniel Gonzalez; Claudeous Creamer; Robert Cardenas; Chris Aguirre
- Past members: Mike Pardi; Barry Fisk; Jeff Andrews; Brian Montana; Mike Sus; Mike Torrão; Larry LaLonde; Duane Connley; Dave Alex Couch; Colin Carmichael; Chris Stolle; Bob Yost; Mark Strausburg; Walter Ryan; Mike Hollman; Paul Perry; Ernesto Bueno; Rick Cortez; Bay Cortez; Tony Campos; Kelly McLauchlin; Emilio Marquez

Possessed is an American death metal band formed in 1982 in the San Francisco Bay Area. Noted for their fast playing style and Jeff Becerra's growled vocals, they are often called the first death metal band, and paved the way for the 1980s Bay Area thrash metal scene, along with Metallica, Exodus, Testament and Death Angel. The band is notable for featuring then-teenage guitarist Larry LaLonde, who went on to join Primus.

After breaking up in 1987, and reforming from 1990 to 1993, the band reformed again around original bassist and vocalist Jeff Becerra in 2007. Possessed has released three studio albums, Seven Churches (1985), Beyond the Gates (1986) and Revelations of Oblivion (2019), as well as one live album, two compilation albums and two EPs.

== History ==
=== Formation (1982–1983) ===
The band originated in the San Francisco Bay Area in 1982, when San Pablo and El Sobrante residents Mike Torrao (guitar) and Mike Sus (drums) started a garage band with vocalist Barry Fisk and former Exodus bassist Jeff Andrews under the name Possessed. While the quartet had begun writing together, the line-up was cut short when Fisk committed suicide by gunshot in front of his girlfriend's house in Tara Hills, California, and Andrews opted not to participate in the group.

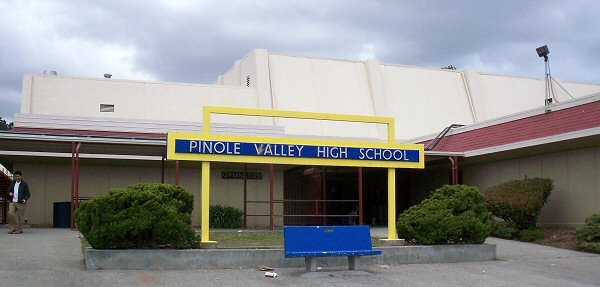
Pinole Valley High School, the alma mater of Jeff Becerra, Larry LaLonde, Danny Boland and Michael Miner

Bassist and vocalist Jeff Becerra had split with his band, Blizzard, in Pinole. That band included guitarists Larry LaLonde and Danny Boland and drummer Michael Miner, all of whom were high school seniors. After Torrao and Sus approached him, Becerra joined Possessed as singer and bassist. The band had placed an advertisement for a new guitarist, to which Brian Montana responded, leading to the second incarnation of Possessed.

=== Initial career (1983–1989) ===
Possessed spent 1983 and 1984 practicing and performing at local venues and becoming active in the Bay Area thrash scene. They recorded the three-song demo Death Metal in 1984. After concerts with Metallica and Exodus, the latter group brought the band's demo recording to Brian Slagel, head of Metal Blade Records. Slagel offered to put the song "Swing of the Axe" on the upcoming compilation Metal Massacre VI. Following the release of the compilation, Montana left the band due to creative differences and was replaced with Blizzard guitarist Larry Lalonde. According to Montana, "I left the band because Torrao had a terrible attitude problem and wouldn’t stop ragging at me. He was like some senile old lady that just wouldn’t shut up. He had a problem with my image. He didn’t think I was evil enough or something. He was always ragging on me to wear an upside down crucifix and be satanic."

The band hired Mechanics Bank heiress Debbie Abono (nee Downer), mother of LaLonde's then-girlfriend, Julie, as their manager.

Combat Records signed the band and released their debut album, Seven Churches, in 1985. Roadrunner Records handled European distribution. In November of that year, the band flew to Montreal, Canada for the WWIII Weekend Festival to support Seven Churches, playing with Celtic Frost, Destruction, Voivod and Nasty Savage. The concert was Possessed's first and largest arena appearance, with nearly 7,000 in attendance. Possessed followed the release with a supporting tour that included a performance with Slayer and Venom at San Francisco's Kabuki in 1986.

On Halloween 1986, Possessed released their second album, Beyond the Gates. They embarked on a short European tour with Voivod and opened for Dark Angel in the U.S. In May 1987, the band issued a five-song EP produced by guitarist Joe Satriani titled The Eyes of Horror, which changed the band's musical direction. Satanic themes were almost completely absent, and the songs were more thrash metal than death metal. The song "Storm in My Mind" was written by Lalonde and the rest by Torrao, who had written most of the band's earlier material. After the release, internal tensions led to the band's break up.

In 1989, Jeff Becerra was held up at gunpoint by two assailants after buying cigarettes at a store. After refusing to give them his money, he was shot twice. Becerra recalled the incident in 2019: "We scuffled, there was no way out of it and I ended up getting shot a couple of times. The first guy pushed a 9-millimeter to my chest. It broke through the ribs and shattered the lungs and stuck on in the spine, so I still have a 9-millimeter slug stuck on the vertebrate T3. I think the second guy was covering me from about 15 feet away, so there was nowhere to run. It was more like a knee-jerk reaction because the first shot was 'Pow!' and right after, 'Pow!' [...] I got shot by two different guns in a robbery. I was doing concrete construction. I worked something like 13 hours that day. I stopped to get a pack of Camels and I guess I flashed a hundred and on the way out, two guys in hoods, little ninja guys came running up with guns: 'Give me all of your fucking money.'" The shooting left Becerra paralyzed from the chest down. The incident occurred while he was employed as a construction worker. He lamented: "I've been in a wheelchair longer than I've been walking. It's my normal."

Despite Becerra's debilitating injuries, he continued to play a role in the death, black, and thrash metal scenes. He struggled with drug and alcohol abuse for the following five years before turning his life around and earning a college degree; he studied at San Francisco State University, majoring in labor studies. He stated that he plans to attend law school.

=== Reformations and recent developments (1990–present) ===
Mike Torrao formed a new version of Possessed in 1990, taking over lead vocals himself, and recorded a two-song demo in 1991. Several different line-ups were attempted, and a four-song demo was recorded in 1993, but the group failed to gain momentum and disbanded shortly thereafter. In 2015, the 1991 demo, as well as ten other recordings from that era of Possessed, were reissued on fellow California death metal band Desecration's retrospective Dead... Yet, Not Forgotten in 2015 (Desecration drummer Bob Yost had performed in Torrao's version of Possessed between 1990 and 1992).

In 2007, it was announced that vocalist and bassist Jeff Becerra would be performing under the Possessed name at the Wacken Open Air festival and would be backed by the members of Sadistic Intent, one of the bands featured on the Possessed tribute album Seven Gates of Horror released in 2004. They would also headline the Gathering of the Bestial Legions III festival in Los Angeles. This same lineup also performed at Maryland Deathfest VIII in May 2010. After a U.S. tour with Danzig and Marduk, Rick and Bay Cortez along with Ernesto Bueno returned to Sadistic Intent, while drummer Emilio Marquez remained.

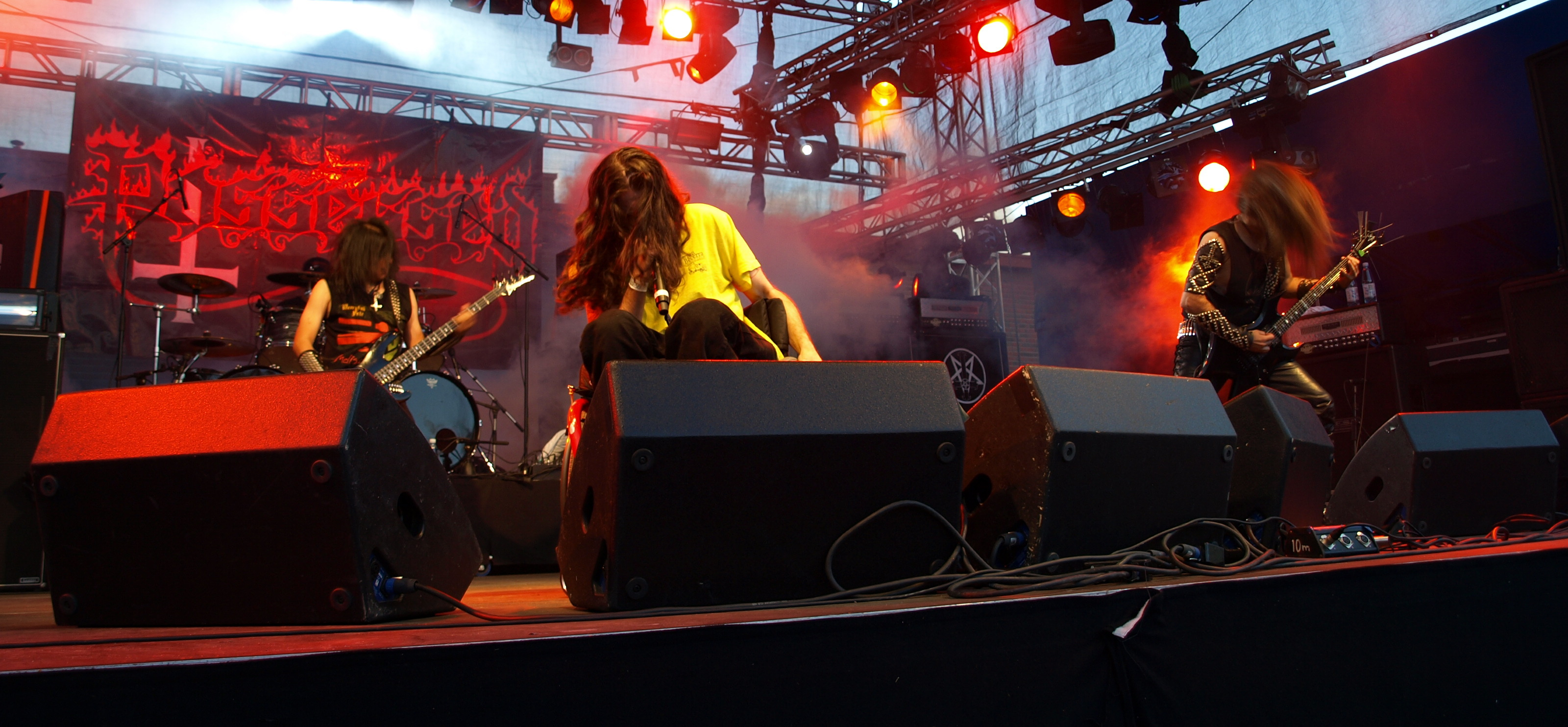
Possessed at Jalometalli 2008 in Finland

By late 2012, Possessed had begun writing new material for their first full-length studio album since 1986's Beyond the Gates. They had performed several new songs live which were expected to appear on the new album.

In 2017, the band signed a three-album recording contract with Nuclear Blast Records. By this time, the band consisted of Becerra and Marquez along with guitarists Daniel Gonzalez and Claudeous Creamer and bassist Robert Cardenas. Initially set for release in 2018, the band's third studio album Revelations of Oblivion was released on May 10, 2019, their first in 33 years. The album entered the UK Rock & Metal Singles and Albums Charts at number 7 in its first week.

In a February 2021 interview, Becerra stated that he would begin writing new material for the next Possessed album after the conclusion of the Revelations of Oblivion tour.

In September 2021, Becerra walked for the first time in 30 years with the aid of robotic legs.

Becerra said in December 2023 that the band would record their new album in 2024. The band performed at Milwaukee Metal Fest in June 2024.

Former guitarist Brian Montana died on April 28, 2025 after he was shot by South San Francisco police officers following an incident in which he reportedly fired at neighbors and officers in a dispute about garden clippings. Police said that alcohol was a factor in the incident. Becerra took to the band's official Instagram account to make a statement, where he said: "The Brian I know is from when we were still just kids back in the beginning of Possessed. He was nothing like what I'm seeing being written about him. In fact, I think that's one of the reasons that led to him leaving Possessed. He just wasn't willing to be as dark as we wanted him to be at that time. We were going for that evil imagery, and Brian was just so lighthearted, even goofy in a good way."

In 2025, the band embarked on a world tour to celebrate the 40th anniversary of Seven Churches, which included legs in Latin America, Australia, and Europe. In an interview with Subculture about the Australian tour, Becerra stated Throne of Sorrow as a working title for the follow-up to Revelations to Oblivion.

== Musical style and influences ==
At least four Possessed members who had written and recorded with the band at some point (vocalist/bassist Becerra and former guitarists Torrao, Montana and LaLonde) cite early Exodus and Venom as their main influences, in addition to new wave of British heavy metal acts like Motörhead, Iron Maiden and Judas Priest, and other bands such as Rush, Scorpions and Van Halen. Although AllMusic attributed Slayer as being a musical influence for Seven Churches, the first Slayer album Show No Mercy had not been released until December 1983, shortly after members of Possessed were already writing material for their demo and debut album. Lyrically, most of Possessed's songs focused on Satanism and death.

== Legacy and influence ==
Possessed are often cited as the first death metal band, largely because of the early use of grunted vocals, ultra-fast drumming and guitar tremolo picking as previously noted. In the 2004 book, Choosing Death: The Improbable History of Death Metal and Grindcore, Jeff Becerra staked claim to creating the "death metal" nomenclature in 1983. The band's efforts on Seven Churches have been called an influence by groups like Death, Pestilence, Sepultura, Deicide, Morbid Angel, Sadistic Intent, Cannibal Corpse, Gorguts, Sinister, Vader, God Dethroned and Amon Amarth, the latter five bands having appeared on a 2004 Possessed tribute album. Possessed's "The Exorcist" had been covered earlier by Cannibal Corpse on the 1993 Hammer Smashed Face EP.

Even while the band had played only a handful of gigs in the Bay Area, they earned a huge capital of popularity in Europe's metal scene. Members of Napalm Death were influenced by Possessed and credit the band for their musical shift from grindcore to a more death metal direction after Scum. In addition to their impression on overseas death metal, the group would also inspire black metal acts like Germany's Falkenbach, Greece's Rotting Christ, Switzerland's Samael and Norway's Dimmu Borgir.

Chuck Schuldiner, who had relocated his band Death to the Bay Area to write Scream Bloody Gore with Chris Reifert, in tandem with Possessed's rise, told magazine Metal Maniacs:

Possessed was different from all the other bands who were coming out at that time. They weren't pure noise, and they attempted to incorporate a lot of different musical ideas into their songwriting, not just rehash the same thing. They were into progressing as a band, which paved the way for other groups to expand their sound and do different things.

In the book Choosing Death, Mantas/Death drummer Kam Lee called Possessed the first death metal band, and added:

When we were in Mantas, (Chuck Schuldiner, Rick Rozz and myself) still had a more Venom/Motörhead sound kinda going on. And then I remember Chuck getting the Possessed demo, and I just remember hearing it and just freaking out like, 'Man, this is the way we gotta be.'

Author Daniel Ekeroth expanded on Lee's assessment of the 1984 Death Metal demo in his book, Swedish Death Metal:

Unlike virtually all other contemporary bands, Possessed left the Venom/Motörhead touches behind, creating "symphonic" tunes, and combining loads of complex riffs and drum patterns with the rawest sounds and fastest paces imaginable...Becerra took his vocal style one step beyond anything the world had heard before, as he seemed to scream and grunt at the same time. All these ideas would later be considered trademarks of death metal, and Possessed's demo has since generally been considered the first pure death metal recording.

Possessed's association with Debbie Abono would be a "first" for both sides: Abono would be the band's first manager, and Possessed were Abono's first managed signed band. A grandmother in her mid-fifties at that time, Abono had no previous connection to heavy metal music other than as a concert designated driver for her daughters, one of whom was a girlfriend of guitarist Larry LaLonde. Due to generation gap, Abono also had limited awareness of the sometimes blasphemous themes of heavy metal, and was allegedly offended upon reading the lyric sheet of Seven Churches. Nevertheless, she agreed to manage and represent Possessed as long as Becerra and LaLonde finished high school commitments. Although the group's relationship amongst themselves and their first manager would reach points of discord and eventual termination, Abono would go on to manage additional bands in the Bay Area thrash metal scene like Exodus, Vio-lence and Forbidden Evil, as well as death metal bands like Chicago's Broken Hope and Florida's Cynic and Obituary.

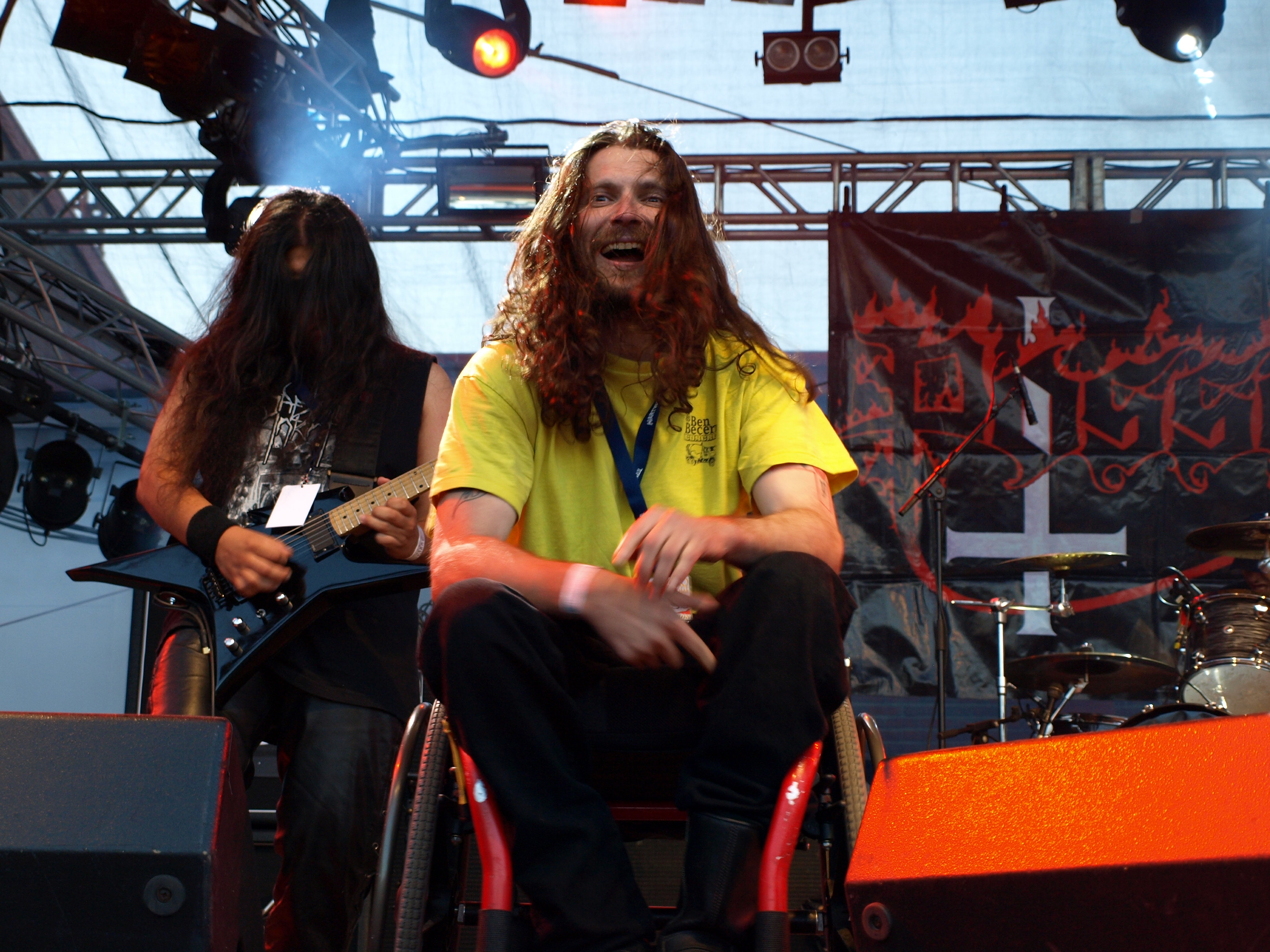
Vocalist Jeff Becerra at Jalometalli 2008

While Possessed's first album, Seven Churches, was praised for its speed and the brutality of the vocals, the second album, Beyond the Gates, disappointed both fans and critics alike. Released on Halloween of 1986, the album was not as powerful and as influential as its predecessor, and the band's popularity suffered because of it. The band members themselves expressed disappointment in the release, in general, and the sound production in particular.

== Other projects ==
In 1993, former drummer Mike Sus retired from music to pursue other careers, going on to get a degree in psychology and is helping injured people to live a normal everyday life. He is also a drug addiction counselor.

Former guitarist Larry LaLonde joined the Bay Area thrash metal band Blind Illusion which released The Sane Asylum in 1988, after which LaLonde went on to join the influential funk metal band Primus in 1989 (led by former Blind Illusion bassist Les Claypool).

In 1995, former guitarist Mike Torrão joined a new death metal band, Infanticide, but never released any songs to the public. Infanticide broke up in 1997. He has since worked as a landscaper and plays music only in his spare time. As of 2008, Torrao is working with the band INaCAGE in the San Francisco Bay Area.

== Members ==
Current

- Jeff Becerra – bass guitar (1983–1987), lead vocals (1983–1987, 2007–present)
- Daniel Gonzalez – guitar (2011–present)
- Robert Cardenas – bass guitar (2012–present)
- Claudeous Creamer – guitar (2016–present)
- Chris Aguirre – drums (2023–present)

Former

- Mike Torrão – guitar (1983–1987, 1990–1993), lead vocals (1990–1993)
- Mike Sus – drums (1983–1987)
- Barry Fisk – lead vocals (1983; died 1983)
- Jeff Andrews – bass guitar (1983)
- Brian Montana – guitar (1983–1984, died 2025)
- Larry LaLonde – guitar (1985–1987)
- Bob Yost – bass guitar (1990–1992; died 2010)
- Duane Connley – guitar (1990)
- Dave Alex Couch – guitar (1990)
- Colin Carmichael – drums (1990)
- Chris Stolle – drums (1990)
- Mark Strausburg – guitar (1991–1993)
- Walter Ryan – drums (1991–1993)
- Paul Perry – bass guitar (1991–1993)
- Mike Hollman – guitar (1993)
- Emilio Márquez – drums (2007–2023)
- Ernesto Bueno – guitar (2007–2010)
- Rick Cortez – guitar (2007–2010)
- Bay Cortez – bass guitar (2007–2010)
- Tony Campos – bass guitar (2011–2012)
- Kelly McLauchlin – guitar (2011–2013)
- Mike Pardi – guitar (2013–2016)

Timeline

== Discography ==
=== Studio albums ===
Year	Title	Label
1985	Seven Churches	Relativity/Combat
1986	Beyond the Gates	Relativity/Combat
2019	Revelations of Oblivion	Nuclear Blast

=== Live albums ===
Year	Title	Label
2004	Agony in Paradise	Agonia

=== Compilation albums ===
Year	Title	Label
1985	Metal Massacre VI	Metal Blade
1992	Victims of Death	Relativity/Combat
2003	Resurrection	Agonia

=== Extended plays ===
Year	Title	Label
1987	The Eyes of Horror	Combat
2006	Ashes from Hell	Boneless
2019	Shadowcult	Nuclear Blast

=== Music videos ===
Year	Title	Label
2019	"Shadowcult (Official Live Video)"	Nuclear Blast
2019	"Graven (Official Music Video)"	Nuclear Blast

=== Documentaries ===
Year	Title	Label
2019	Murder in the Front Row	Bonded by Blood
