= Hell Awaits =

Studio album by Slayer
- Released: April 8, 1985
- Studio: Eldorado Recording (Los Angeles)
- Genre: Thrash metal
- Length: 37:11
- Label: Metal Blade
- Producers: Slayer; Brian Slagel

Slayer chronology
| Live Undead (1984) | Hell Awaits (1985) | Reign in Blood (1986) |

Hell Awaits is the second studio album by American thrash metal band Slayer, released on April 8, 1985, by Metal Blade Records. After the band's 1983 debut Show No Mercy became the label's highest-selling release, producer Brian Slagel decided to record and release a second Slayer album. Unlike the previous album, which was paid for by band members, Slagel co-financed the recording budget with the band and recruited Ron Fair despite his lack of experience working with heavy metal musicians.

As with their debut, the lyrical themes on Hell Awaits include hell and Satan, while the intro of the title track played backwards reveals the repeated phrase "join us". Musically, the album features the band's most diverse work compared to their previous releases. According to Kerry King, he and Jeff Hanneman were very into Mercyful Fate at the time, which led to the longer and more progressive songs. The sound on the album has been described as "sludgy and amorphous" in comparison to the "sharp and clear" production of its succeeding album, Reign in Blood.

Hell Awaits received critical acclaim upon release, with many deeming it an improvement over the previous album due to its higher production quality and darker sound. As a result of the album's success, it was the last Slayer record to be released by Metal Blade and the only one to be produced by Slagel. Defined as "influential to future extreme metal acts", the best known songs from the album were re-recorded by various heavy metal bands and have appeared on several tribute albums.

== Recording ==
Slayer's previous album, Show No Mercy, became Metal Blade Records' highest selling release, selling 40,000 copies worldwide; the success led producer Brian Slagel to want to record another album with them. Slagel hired producer Ron Fair, who worked for Chrysalis Records, and had seen the band perform live and enjoyed their performance. On seeing Slayer in the studio, Fair stated, "Wow, these guys are really angry," as he was inexperienced working with heavy metal musicians. Slagel financed the album, in stark contrast to Show No Mercy, which was financed by singer Tom Araya, who used his earnings as a respiratory therapist, and a loan from guitarist Kerry King's father.

"Hell Awaits" (1985)
30 second sample from the intro of "Hell Awaits", with the backwards demonic voice.

The budget organized by Slagel allowed for professional assistance. Bernie Grundman provided audio mastering, Eddy Schreyer worked on remastering, and Bill Metoyer, who worked on the band's earlier release Haunting the Chapel, acted as sound engineer. The recording featured audio effects such as the intro to "Hell Awaits", a reversed recording of a demonic-sounding voice repeating "Join us", ending with "Welcome back". Still, Araya later stated the album had poor production quality: "Nowadays, production-wise, it's so under par. But for what it was at the time, those are amazing records to me. I guess we could go in and redo it. But why ruin it?"

Drummer Dave Lombardo, on the other hand, asserts the album was professionally done compared to Show No Mercy: "I didn't have to overdub the cymbals, and we had a really good engineer." Lombardo's favorite song is "At Dawn They Sleep", "because it was kind of slow and grungy, but then it had that double-bass part at the end." While recording the track, neither guitarists King, nor Jeff Hanneman who wrote the lyrics, were in the studio—only Araya and Slagel. On reading the lyrics, which featured a misspelled word, Araya sang it as it was spelled, although it is not a real word. The song "Hardening of the Arteries" on the album ends with a very similar section that makes up the beginning of the song "Hell Awaits" and is also one of the only Slayer songs to fade out on a continuous riff.

The album's cover art was done by Albert Cuellar. Araya told The Quietus that the art was put together "overnight", with the scene of "skeletal demon beasts" fighting in hell directly resembling a scene of a 1977 issue of the comic Heavy Metal. It went unnoticed until 2011 when a blog post uploaded PDFs of the story "Approaching Centauri" drawn by Jean Giraud.

== Touring ==
To promote Hell Awaits, Slayer embarked on the Combat Tour with Venom and Exodus. Exodus guitarist Gary Holt commented, "We immediately bonded with the Slayer guys. It was two bands of friends playing with one band of heroes, you know? We were just star-struck."

Inside Venom's tour bus (the first time Slayer had been in one) the band members got drunk with Venom, while listening to Hell Awaits. Araya entered the bus "hammered out of his mind", according to Lombardo, saying "I gotta take a piss! Where's the bathroom in this thing?" Venom singer Conrad "Cronos" Lant responded, saying "Right here—right here in my mouth!" Araya took it almost literally and urinated on his hair. Cronos got up and punched him in the face, the two blamed each other all night, and Araya continued the tour with a black eye. Araya will not discuss the incident other than saying that he was drunk and it was a very disrespectful thing to do.

== Reception ==
Professional ratings
Review scores
| Source | Rating |
|---|---|
| AllMusic | 4/5 stars |
| The Rolling Stone Album Guide | 4/5 stars |
| Rock Hard | 9/10 |

Although it did not enter any charts, Hell Awaits was hailed upon its release as Slayer's most progressive recording, featuring a much darker thrash-oriented style, with unusual arrangements such as varying tempos, and dissonant nuances that "paved the way to a wholly distinctive sound all their own", according to AllMusic reviewer Eduardo Rivadavia. Rivadavia awarded the album four out of five stars, saying that it was "incredibly ahead of its time" and referred to it as "a mandatory item in the band's remarkable discography". It has sold over 1,000,000 records worldwide according to Brian Slagel.

In the book Legends of Rock Guitar, Hell Awaits was defined as "a psychotic exploration into the depths of Satanism and physical torture". The book, a chronology of the great guitarists of rock which includes both Kerry King and Jeff Hanneman, observed the band's evolution in comparison with their previous album, Show No Mercy, saying, "The musicianship is improved, as is lead singer Tom Araya's voice, making the band sound less like hacks and more like metal fiends. The sludgy riffs, which were pure [Black] Sabbath, are offset by some of King's and Hanneman's faster solos, giving Slayer entrée into the speed metal realm."

== Influence ==
Musicians such as singer Phil Anselmo and drummer Gene Hoglan cite Hell Awaits as an influence. Anselmo—known for his work with Pantera, Down, and Superjoint Ritual—explained in an interview with D. X. Ferris, author of the book about the album Reign in Blood, that "Hell Awaits just holds the entire thing. Every bit of everything to do with heavy music. [Slayer] are gods, the best band from California, for sure." Norwegian musician Frode Sivertsen (also known as "E. N. Death"), former member of the black metal band Gehenna, says the song "Hell Awaits" and Slayer's music in general has influenced him as a musician, ranking the album in his top five. Dimebag Darrell of Pantera and Damageplan picked "At Dawn They Sleep" among his 12 Favorite Tunes in the March 1993 issue of Guitar World, stating that Slayer taught him "how to play with guts and aggression".

Trey Azagthoth, guitar player and main composer of death metal legends Morbid Angel, said that when Hell Awaits "came out I was very much into". That record "gave me a lot of inspiration." He gets into further detail:

When the Hell Awaits album came out it was something that everyone was looking forward to and it came out and gave everybody what they wanted. It gave me what I wanted. It was furious, exciting, and it was still new. It was memorable. I think it was a milestone; almost but not quite a good foundational album for death metal.

Defined as "influential to future extreme metal acts", the most popular songs from Hell Awaits were re-recorded by various underground metal bands, and have appeared in several tribute albums, such as Slatanic Slaughter II and Gateway to Hell 1 & 2. The song "Hell Awaits" has been covered by Cradle of Filth, Incantation, Earth Crisis, and Mr Bungle, "Kill Again" by Angelcorpse, "Praise of Death" by Sinister, "At Dawn They Sleep" by Six Feet Under, and "Necrophiliac" by Sadistic Intent, Sinister, Benediction and Fleshcrawl.

== Track listing ==
Side one
| No. | Title | Lyrics | Music | Length |
|---|---|---|---|---|
| 1. | "Hell Awaits" | Kerry King | Jeff Hanneman; King | 6:16 |
| 2. | "Kill Again" | King | Hanneman; King | 4:56 |
| 3. | "At Dawn They Sleep" | Tom Araya; Hanneman; King | Hanneman | 6:17 |

Side two
| No. | Title | Lyrics | Music | Length |
|---|---|---|---|---|
| 4. | "Praise of Death" | Hanneman | King | 5:21 |
| 5. | "Necrophiliac" | Hanneman; King | Hanneman | 3:46 |
| 6. | "Crypts of Eternity" | Araya; Hanneman; King | Hanneman; King | 6:40 |
| 7. | "Hardening of the Arteries" | Hanneman | Hanneman | 3:55 |
| Total length: | | | | 37:11 |

Bonus tracks^{[†]}
| No. | Title | Writer(s) | Length |
|---|---|---|---|
| 8. | "Haunting the Chapel" | Hanneman; King | 4:00 |
| 9. | "Captor of Sin" | Hanneman; King | 3:31 |
| Total length: | | | 44:42 |

† The Metal Classics version features two additional songs taken from Haunting the Chapel. The version of Show No Mercy from the same series (CD ZORRO 7) includes the remaining two tracks from the EP.

== Personnel ==
Slayer

- Tom Araya – bass, vocals
- Kerry King – guitars
- Jeff Hanneman – guitars
- Dave Lombardo – drums

Production

- Brian Slagel – production
- Slayer – production
- Carolyn Collins – assistant engineering
- Ron Fair – engineering
- Bernie Grundman – mastering
- Albert Cuellar – artwork
- Brian James – layout design
- Bill Metoyer – engineering
- Lowell Katz – photography

== Charts ==
Chart performance for Hell Awaits
| Chart (2021–2026) | Peak position |
|---|---|
| Austrian Albums (Ö3 Austria) | 36 |
| Belgian Albums (Ultratop Flanders) | 62 |
| Belgian Albums (Ultratop Wallonia) | 137 |
| German Albums (Offizielle Top 100) | 8 |
| German Rock & Metal Albums (Offizielle Top 100) | 2 |
| Swiss Albums (Schweizer Hitparade) | 31 |
| Scottish Albums (Scottish Singles and Albums Charts) | 65 |
| Swedish Physical Albums (Sverigetopplistan) | 5 |
| UK Rock & Metal Albums (Official Charts) | 24 |
