= Debbie Abono =

American band manager (1929–2010)

- Born: Deborah Ann Downer; August 31, 1929; Oakland, California, U.S.
- Died: May 16, 2010 (aged 80)
- Family: E. M. Downer (grandfather)

Deborah Ann Abono (nee Downer; August 31, 1929 – May 16, 2010) was an American manager of death metal and thrash metal bands during the 1980s and early 2000s.

== Biography ==
Abono was born in Oakland, California, as Deborah Ann Downer to Gertrude and E. M. Downer, Jr. She was a granddaughter of E. M. Downer, who founded Mechanics Bank. She had served on the Board of Directors of the bank at one time. Her career as a heavy metal manager began in the mid-eighties when the members of Possessed, one of the first death metal bands, asked her to manage the group. After they assured her there was "nothing to it ... all you gotta do is get us shows," she agreed and even let them practice at her house. A grandmother at that time, Abono had no connections to heavy metal music other than through one of her daughters, who was dating Possessed's then-guitarist Larry LaLonde.

According to author David Konow, Abono was unaware of the sometimes blasphemous themes of heavy metal and was offended after reading the lyrics to Seven Churches, the band's debut album. Nevertheless, she agreed to continue managing Possessed on the condition that LaLonde and vocalist Jeff Becerra finish high school. Because Possessed suffered from internal conflicts, Abono would go on to manage additional bands in the Bay Area metal scene like Exodus, Vio-lence, and Forbidden, as well as death metal bands like Chicago's Broken Hope and Florida's Cynic and Obituary. Other bands that she managed included Sepultura and Skinlab.

Abono died on May 16, 2010 from cancer, aged 80. In honour of Abono and Ronnie James Dio (who had died the same day, also from cancer), Machine Head's Robb Flynn recorded and released for free online a cover of Black Sabbath's "Die Young". Abono managed Flynn and Machine Head guitarist Phil Demmel when they were members of Vio-lence.
