= Live Undead =

Live album by Slayer
- Released: November 16, 1984
- Recorded: 1984, New York City
- Genre: Thrash metal
- Length: 23:16
- Label: Metal Blade
- Producer: Brian Slagel; Slayer

Slayer chronology
Haunting the Chapel (1984)	Live Undead (1984)	Hell Awaits (1985)

Live Undead is the first live album by American thrash metal band Slayer. It was released through Metal Blade Records and recorded in New York City in front of a room of people. It has been questioned by both critics and authors that the audience sound may or may not be faked. However, in 1984, WBAB Fingers Metal Shop, a radio station, held a contest to meet and hang out with Slayer during a live recording. The album was recorded at Tiki Recording Studios in Glen Cove, NY in front of around a dozen people. The album was originally intended to be recorded in front of a live audience, but things went wrong. Nevertheless, when asked if they were fake, producer Bill Metoyer said, "I don't know if I should tell you." The album begins with an extended introduction of "Black Magic", followed by a small speech. The remaining tracks include both those of 1983's Show No Mercy and 1984's Haunting the Chapel.

== Conception ==
The seven-track live record was recorded in front of a room full of people in New York City in the autumn of 1984. It has been rumored that the crowd noise was added in a studio rather than recorded on stage. Joel McIver, author of The Bloody Reign of Slayer, asked Live Undead's producer/engineer Bill Metoyer, who had worked on the album in Los Angeles. Metoyer responded: "I don't know if I should tell you [if the crowd noises were faked]! Isn't that one of those great industry secrets? Let's just say that when you're doing a live record, you want live sound — even if perhaps the microphones didn't pick up the audience properly."

Live Undead marked the beginning of a short association between Slayer and artist Albert Cueller. Cueller would design the sleeve image, which depicts the four band members as grinning, partially decayed zombies walking through a graveyard.

== Music ==
The EP begins with "Black Magic", with an extended introduction building alongside the audience's yelling. The song is performed faster, heavier, and more confident than its original recording in 1983. When the song is over, lead vocalist Tom Araya says, "They say the pen is mightier than the sword. Well I say fuck the pen! Cause you can die by the sword.", and the band begins playing "Die by the Sword". The band then run-through "Captor of Sin", "The Antichrist", "Evil Has No Boundaries", and "Show No Mercy". "Aggressive Perfector" is dedicated to the Old Bridge Militia, a group of headbangers from Old Bridge, New Jersey. "Aggressive Perfector" is performed with more "power", as described by author Joel McIver, who described the entire track listing as, "a fearsome set, although the rest of the songs don't quite have the visceral power of the opening track. In fact, the Live Undead version of "Black Magic" established a career-long trend of Slayer's live songs being more powerful than the studio versions, with very few exceptions".

== Reception and release ==
Professional ratings
Review scores
Source	Rating
AllMusic	2.5/5 stars
The Rolling Stone Album Guide	2/5 stars

AllMusic's employee Ned Raggett gave the album a two and a half star rating, noting that "Live Undead isn't really necessary except for the hardest of hardcore fans in the end, especially in comparison to Decade of Aggression," and saying that "Evil Has No Boundaries" was the best performance of the seven songs. Raggett also wrote that despite being an unnecessary release, "it does have its 'it could only be Slayer' moments — including Araya's almost casual way of rudely introducing 'Captor of Sin'."

The album was originally released in 1984 under Metal Blade Records. In both 1993 and 1994, it was re-released with the same catalog numbers. In 2006, it was again re-released as an eleven-track record. It included the Haunting the Chapel EP and the studio version of "Aggressive Perfector".

== Track listing ==
Original release

Side one
No.	Title	Lyrics	Music	Length
1.	"Black Magic"	Kerry King	Jeff Hanneman; King	3:57
2.	"Die by the Sword"	Hanneman	Hanneman	4:03
3.	"Captor of Sin"	Hanneman; King	Hanneman; King	3:32
4.	"The Antichrist"	Hanneman	Hanneman; King	3:13

Side two
No.	Title	Lyrics	Music	Length
5.	"Evil Has No Boundaries"	Hanneman; King	King	2:58
6.	"Show No Mercy"	King	King	3:02
7.	"Aggressive Perfector"	Hanneman; King	Hanneman; King	2:29
Total length:				23:16

Reissue edition bonus tracks
No.	Title	Writer(s)	Length
8.	"Chemical Warfare" (from Haunting the Chapel EP)	Hanneman; King	6:02
9.	"Captor of Sin" (from Haunting the Chapel EP)	Hanneman; King	3:29
10.	"Haunting the Chapel" (from Haunting the Chapel EP)	Hanneman; King	3:56
11.	"Aggressive Perfector" (from Haunting the Chapel EP)	Hanneman; King	3:28
Total length:			40:11

== Personnel ==
The following personnel can be sourced from the album's notes.

Slayer

- Tom Araya – bass, vocals
- Jeff Hanneman – guitars
- Kerry King – guitars
- Dave Lombardo – drums

Technical personnel

- Brian Slagel – production
- Slayer – production
- Mark Gaide - Audio Engineer - Tiki Studios
- Bill Metoyer – engineer
- Eddy Schreyer – remastering
- Brian Ames – layout design
- Albert Cueller – artwork, cover art

== Charts ==
Chart performance for Live Undead
Chart (2021)	Peak position
German Albums (Offizielle Top 100)	77
