= Bay Area thrash metal =

Music genre

- Other names: Bay Area thrash
- Stylistic origins: NWOBHM; speed metal; hardcore punk; punk rock
- Cultural origins: The San Francisco Bay Area in the early 1980s
- Derivative forms: Groove metal

Regional scenes
- San Francisco, California

Local scenes
- The San Francisco Bay Area

Bay Area thrash metal (also known as Bay Area thrash) referred to a steady following of heavy metal bands in the 1980s who formed and gained international status in the San Francisco Bay Area in California. Along with Central Florida, the scene was widely regarded as a starting point of American thrash metal, crossover thrash and death metal.

== History ==
=== Exodus and Metallica ===
The earliest documented roots of the Bay Area thrash scene date back to the formation of Exodus in 1979. By the time the group recorded their full-length album four years later, five different guitarists or bassists had already passed through the lineup, with some going on to join or form bands that were equally relevant to the area's burgeoning metal scene. In November 1982, Exodus opened a show at San Francisco's Old Waldorf venue for Metallica, a then-relatively unknown (and unsigned) band from Southern California who were recently discovered by Brian Slagel and had appeared on the first volume of his Metal Massacre compilation. Exodus (who were also unsigned at this time) had distributed an untitled demo the same year with a lineup that included guitarist Kirk Hammett.

Although Metallica had initially formed in Los Angeles, it was not until their February 1983 relocation to the East Bay area that Cliff Burton formerly from Trauma joined as bassist, sealing the band's first, formative lineup. The group (which then consisted of Burton, James Hetfield, Lars Ulrich, and Dave Mustaine) had moved into a Carlson Blvd. house in El Cerrito, near Albany Hill, which had been rented by Mark Whitaker, then-manager of Exodus. After Mustaine was removed from the lineup that same year, then-Exodus guitarist Hammett would replace him following Whitaker's recommendation; in turn, Mustaine would move back to Los Angeles to form Megadeth.

Metallica's signing to Megaforce Records, the release of their first album and the songwriting process and rehearsals for Ride the Lightning and Master of Puppets had all taken place while the group resided at Whitaker's El Cerrito home.

=== Networking between local bands ===
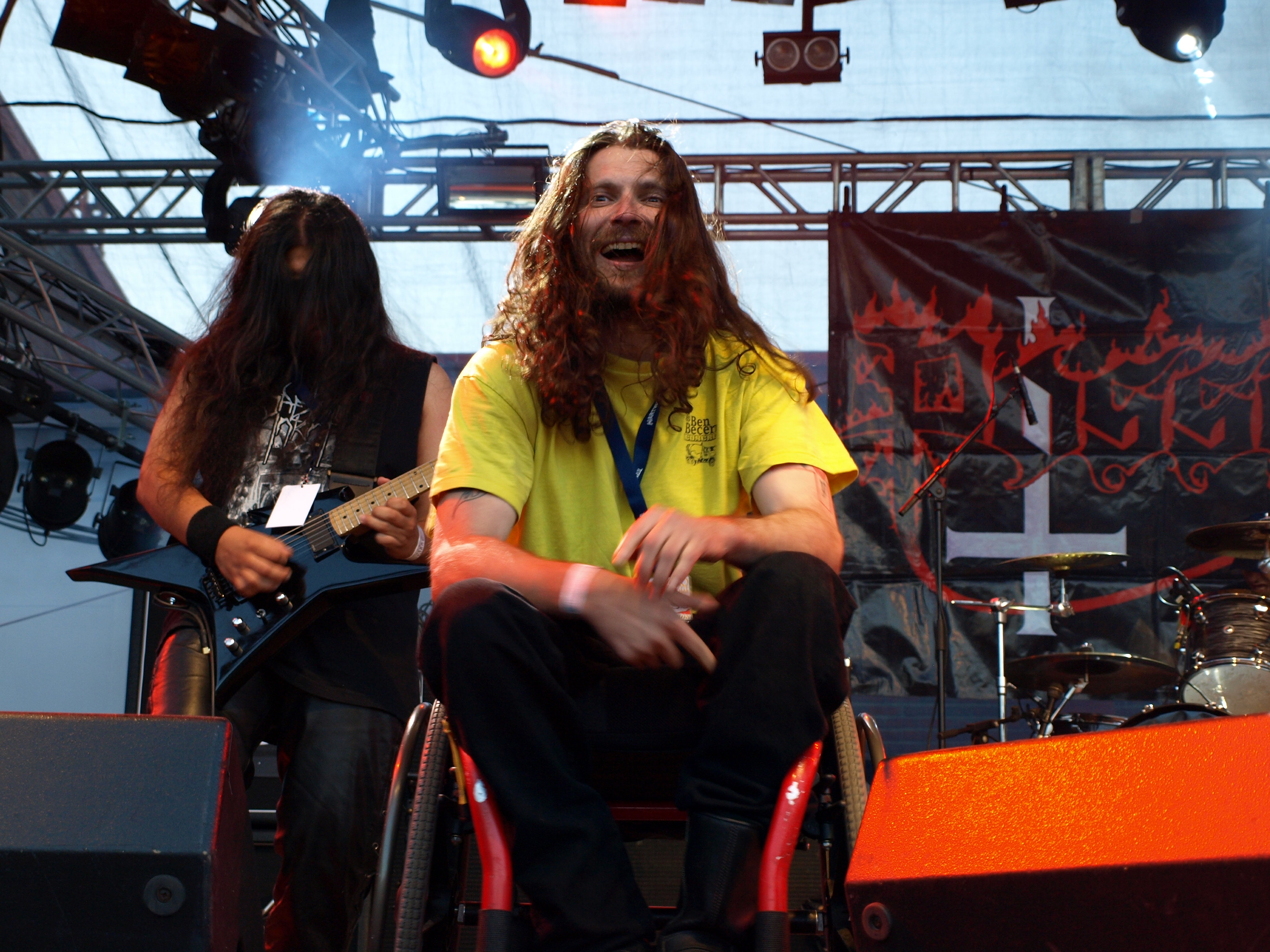
Jeff Becerra of Possessed, 2008

Burton and Hammett's friendship with other local acts, notably Oakland's Exodus and Testament, and later, San Francisco's Death Angel—among others—strongly vitalized the scene, leading to intensive touring and tape trading that would cross borders and seas, and eventually graduate to record signings.

El Sobrante's Possessed would bring a turning point to the genre with 1985's Seven Churches, regarded as the first album to cross over from thrash metal to death metal for the largely "growling vocals" and subject matter dealing with horror and the occult. In addition to the inspiration of black metal, it would predate other albums, such as Los Angeles-based Slayer's Reign in Blood and Death's San Francisco Bay Area-written and rehearsed Scream Bloody Gore, which had also been regarded as influential to thrash and death metal.

Members from Possessed had also maintained a strong network with other integral musicians of the Bay Area thrash scene: vocalist Jeff Becerra and then-guitarist Larry LaLonde had played in a short-lived speed metal band called Blizzard, which featured former Exodus bassist Carlton Melson and Desecration guitarist Danny Boland (then-Possessed drummer Mike Sus and former Possessed bassist Bob Yost had also played in Desecration, a Bay Area death/thrash band active between 1985 and 1989). Former Exodus bassist Geoff Andrews co-founded Possessed before Becerra replaced him in 1983, taking over both vocal and bass duties. Andrews went on to form the thrash band Sabertooth with Johnee McKelvey.

After Possessed's first disbanding, LaLonde went on to join Blind Illusion, which featured former Exodus members Evan McCaskey and Tim Agnello, then-Heathen members Marc Biedermann and Dave Godfrey, and Blizzard drummer Mike Miner. Blind Illusion co-founder Les Claypool (who was a high school friend of Kirk Hammett at Richmond's DeAnza High School) would unsuccessfully audition as Metallica's bassist in 1986 after Burton's bus accident death in Sweden.

=== Networking between bands in other scenes ===
Heavy metal in Southern California had spanned back to the 1970s, and in the 1980s, was the home base of Slayer and Megadeth, two of thrash's "big four". However, from the mid-1980s until the early 1990s, glam metal had been the pervading and popular subgenre within the boundaries of the Los Angeles scene.

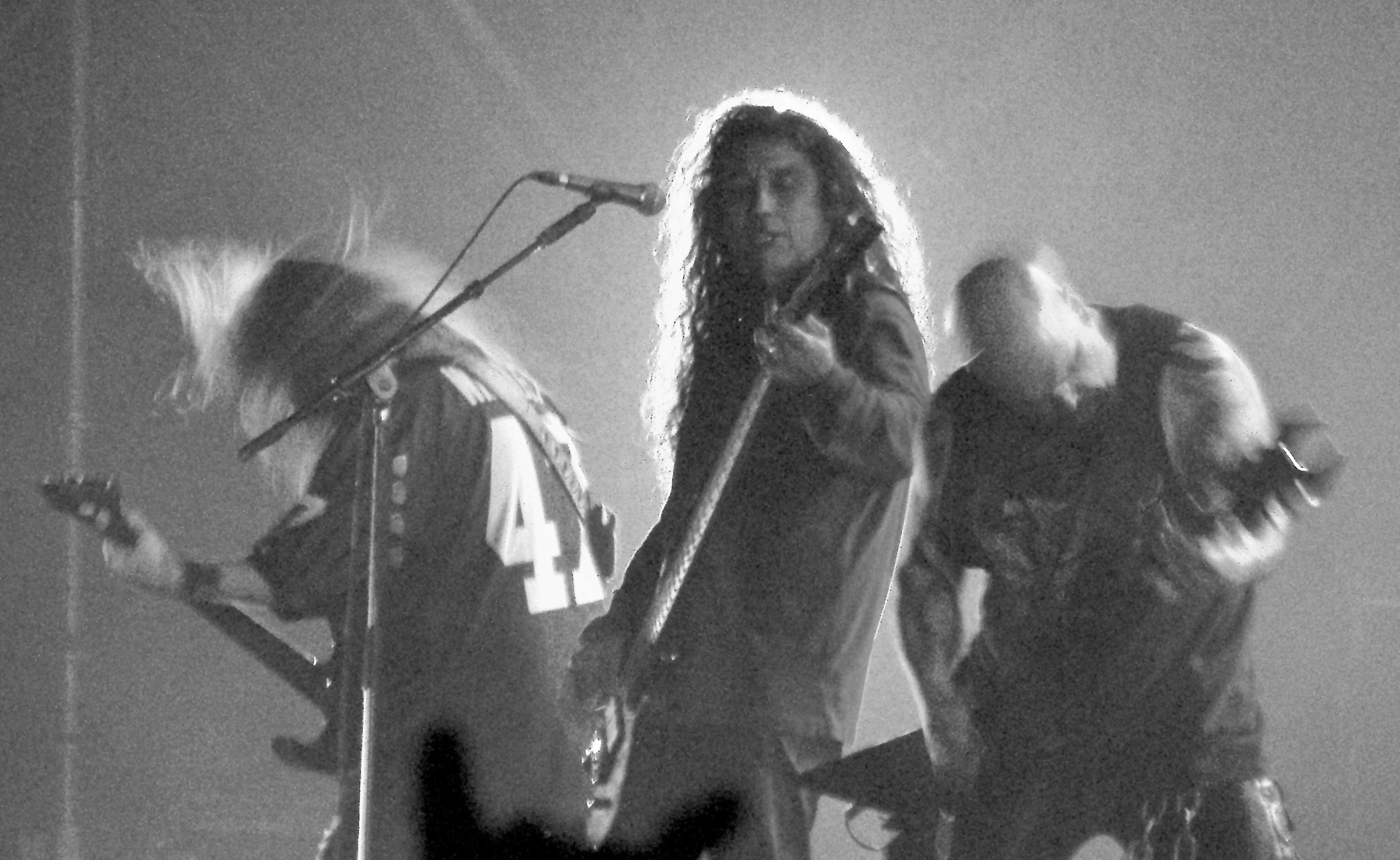
Slayer's Jeff Hanneman, Tom Araya and Kerry King at the 2007 Hellfest. Although Slayer was not formed in the Bay Area, the band had gotten an early headstart in the Bay Area thrash metal scene, and they are often associated (along with Megadeth) as being a part of it.

Notwithstanding, both Slayer and Megadeth would receive recognition early in their careers by playing at Bay Area venues, including Berkeley's Ruthie's Inn with Exodus between 1984 and 1985, a time in which current Slayer guitarist Kerry King had played alongside Mustaine in Megadeth. Oakland native Jeff Hanneman was a founding Slayer member; Paul Bostaph (formerly of Forbidden, and later Exodus and Testament) had been Slayer's full-time drummer for the balance of the 1990s. Similarly, drummer Dave Lombardo played on Testament's The Gathering album before returning to Slayer in 2004.

In 1987, shortly after the release of Scream Bloody Gore and Chuck Schuldiner's move back to Florida, Chris Reifert would form his own endeavor, Autopsy, which has also been regarded as an early inspiration of the death metal genre. Autopsy's 1989 debut, Severed Survival, would feature bassist Steve Di Giorgio, founder of Antioch, California thrash metal band Sadus; Schuldiner had also met DiGiorgio while living in the Bay Area, who would play bass for Death on the albums Human and Individual Thought Patterns.

== Musical characteristics ==
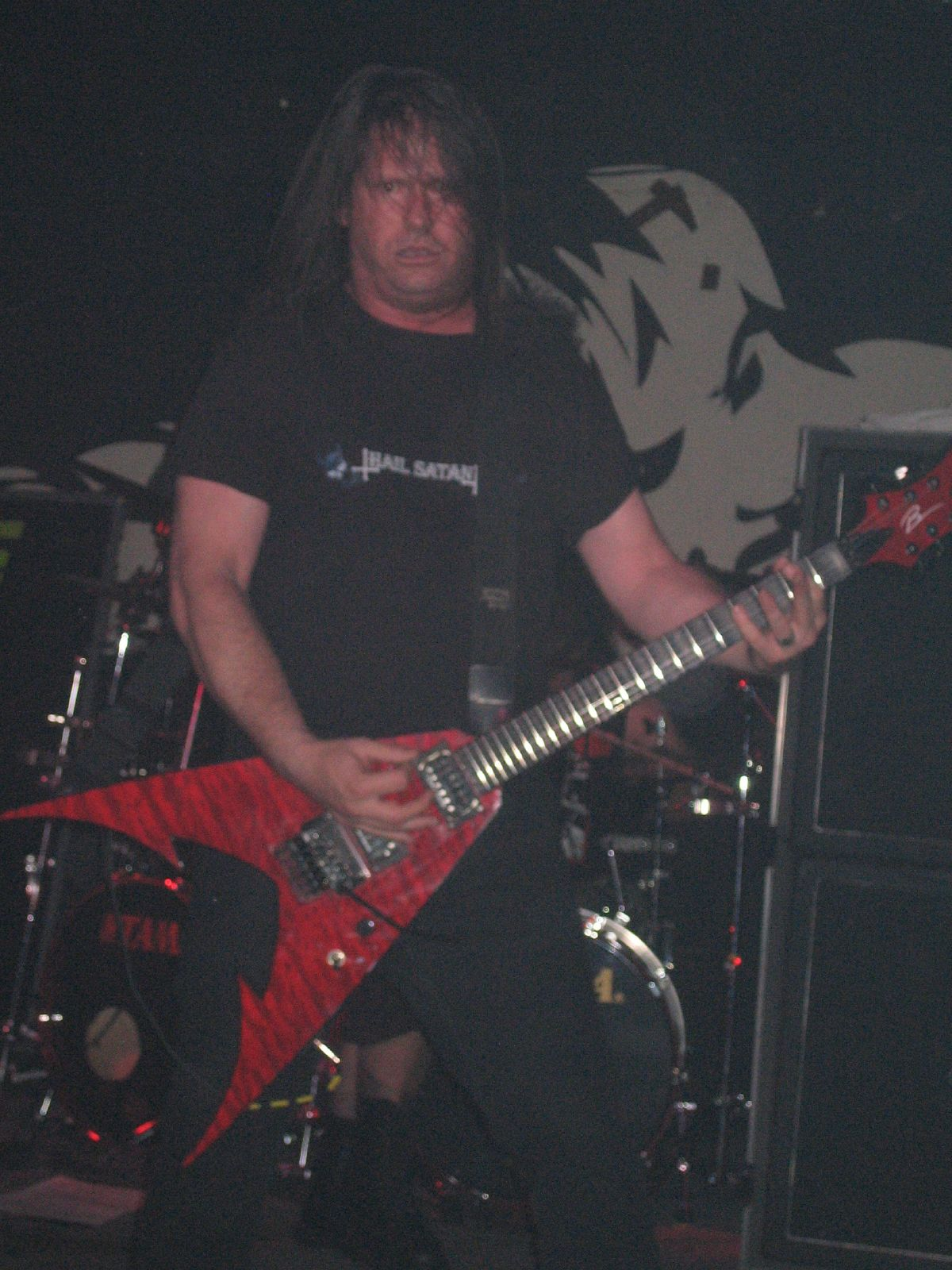
Exodus guitarist and songwriter Gary Holt live in concert, 2005

According to Ken McIntyre of Metal Hammer, "Regardless of what it was called in its infancy, the sound produced by these early San Francisco bands was like nothing ever heard before. Young, fleet-fingered savages were pushing musical boundaries, playing faster and with more intricacy then seemed humanly possible."

=== Influences ===
As different thrash metal scenes developed around the world throughout the 1980s, each had their own distinct style and influence.

Several early luminaries of the Bay Area scene borrowed heavily from the new wave of British heavy metal and early punk rock: Exodus guitarist Gary Wayne Holt mentioned discovering Tygers of Pan Tang, Diamond Head, Trauma, Angel Witch, Venom and Budgie on a KUSF radio show hosted by Ian Kallen and Ron Quintana. Hammett, Hetfield and Ulrich have also cited Venom and Budgie as important influences, in addition to punk acts like the Misfits, Charged GBH and Discharge. Albums that very much reflected this era and inspiration include Kill 'Em All and Bonded By Blood.

Other bands, such as Attitude Adjustment, took the hardcore punk influence to a greater extent, with the aforementioned group involving former musicians from Agnostic Front, D.R.I., and Murphy's Law during their lineup history, in addition to show dates at 924 Gilman, a Berkeley venue more oriented to hardcore punk than heavy metal music.

Attitude Adjustment's style, "crossover thrash", a grindcore precursor, would influence many bands of the latter subgenre, including chief innovator, the British band Napalm Death, who would cover Attitude Adjustment's "Dope Fiend" and Hirax's "Hate, Fear, and Power" on an exclusive covers album (coincidentally, the Hirax track had featured Attitude Adjustment drummer Eric Brecht on the original 1986 recording). Hirax, while Orange County, California-based, had many connections to bands of the Bay Area thrash scene, as the group had played at Ruthie's Inn, and in past lineups, featured Paul Baloff (formerly of Exodus and Heathen) and Ron McGovney (Metallica's first bassist).

Long Island-born multi-instrumentalist Joe Satriani had relocated to Berkeley, California, in 1978 to pursue a career teaching music; although he was mainly influenced by blues rock and had not specialized in heavy metal music initially, many of Satriani's students would go on to become progenital guitarists in the Bay Area metal scene, including Kirk Hammett of Metallica/Exodus, Larry LaLonde of Possessed, Alex Skolnick of Testament, Rick Hunolt of Exodus, Phil Kettner of Lȧȧz Rockit and Geoff Tyson of T-Ride. Satriani would also produce Possessed's 1987 The Eyes of Horror EP.

Jeff Becerra of Possessed cites early Exodus, Venom and Motörhead as his inspirations, calling bassist/vocalist Lemmy his greatest of influences. Although Allmusic attributed Slayer as being a musical influence for 1985's Seven Churches, the first Slayer album Show No Mercy had not been released until December 1983, shortly after members of Possessed were already writing material for their demo and debut album. However, former Possessed member Brian Montana explained that guitarist Mike Torrao once wanted Possessed to have a "Slayer-type outfit" (which then consisted of make-up, leather, pentagrams, and inverted crosses), something Montana rejected as being too derivative. Montana (who had played guitar on the first Possessed demo) also cited early Exodus as an influence, in addition to Iron Maiden, Judas Priest, Yngwie Malmsteen, and Joe Satriani.

=== Image, themes, philosophies and lifestyle ===
In regards to heavy metal and image, Sadus co-founder Steve Di Giorgio explained:

...in high school, if you were playing any kind of music that wasn't dance, or just something that was really different—you know, rock, metal or hard rock, anything like that—then you needed to look like it. You needed to look like a bad dude, and we just looked like normal dudes....It wasn't about trying to impress everybody, because we looked at those types of people as weenies trying to do that stuff ... We just wore our normal stuff and we didn't really think about it. It just kind of happened that way and I think because we were searching for an extreme style, coupled with this no image, who-cares-what-we-look-like thing, then I think we fit in to that new movement that we discovered a little ways later, the whole Bay Area thrash scene.

For logos, many bands within the Bay Area scene had a more "do it yourself"-artistic approach compared to the older metal bands using an already established font. Conversely, professional illustrators (most notably Ed Repka on Beyond the Gates, Eternal Nightmare, Product of Society, and Scream Bloody Gore) were sometimes utilized to design album art.

Lyrical topics generally dealt in themes like the occult, horror, death, witchcraft, warfare, destruction, violence, apocalypse, rebellion and tyranny. However, some groups took on subjects more relevant to the day. Metallica's "Master of Puppets", from the 1986 album of the same name, deals with the issues of hard drugs, with some phrases in the song being references to cocaine use. The crack-cocaine epidemic had been an active problem at that time for many large U.S. cities, and particularly affected the San Francisco Bay Area.

Dave Mustaine's association to the Bay Area scene was limited to his brief El Cerrito tenure with Metallica (in addition to the early Megadeth shows). However, the "Megadeth" namesake emanated from a pamphlet written by then–U.S. Senator Alan Cranston, a prominent politician from the South Bay. Cranston's text related to nuclear disarmament and the Cold War, two hot-button political issues during the 1980s which would become song topics on the second Megadeth album, Peace Sells... But Who's Buying?.

At live shows, members of Exodus were forward in their disdain for the glam metal scene in Los Angeles, making the phrase "kill the posers" a common stage mantra; guitarist Gary Holt often recalled how both he and then-singer Paul Baloff would approach individuals wearing Ratt or Mötley Crüe T-shirts, cut the clothes up with pocket knives (either for or against the wearer's will) and then tied the mangled fabrics around their wrist as a "badge of honor." Despite Holt later conceding to being a Ratt fan himself (along with guitarist Lee Altus), he still criticized the image-driven mentality of glam metal, and described Exodus and other thrash metal bands as being more "based on musicianship, chops, songwriting and performance".

While Vio-lence had been signed to a major label (MCA Records) for their 1988 debut album, a rare feat for any 2nd wave thrash band, then-guitarist Robb Flynn described tour life:

...we were all like nineteen ... our stuff was crammed into the van, no hotels, crashing out on people's floors and shit like that. (Then-Vio-lence manager) Debbie (Abono) came out with us for a few dates and those ruled because we'd get to eat at Denny's. We'd just eat as much as humanly possible and hopefully we'd eat at the show, but we had absolutely no spending money. We weren't making anything, that's for sure, maybe we made $50 a night.

== Decline ==
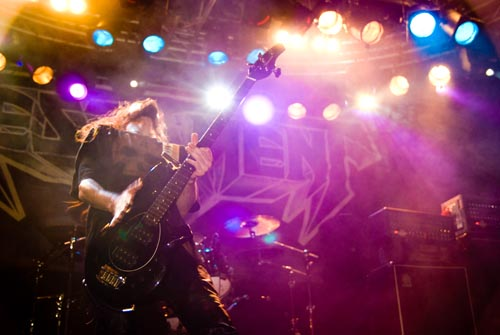
Greg Christian of Testament, live at Hole in the Sky, 2007

By the early 1990s, the scene had mostly died down, with many groups disbanding, going on hiatus or venturing to musical styles deemed more commercial or accessible at the time.

Oakland thrash metal band Vio-lence would dissolve, leading guitarist Robb Flynn to form and front Machine Head, who would help popularize the groove metal genre. Flynn (who had also co-founded Forbidden) would be joined by drummer Chris Kontos (formerly of Attitude Adjustment) and later guitarist Phil Demmel, who played alongside Flynn in Vio-lence.

Vocalist Steev Esquivel would take a similar direction to Flynn after the 1994 breakup of his thrash metal band, Defiance, when he formed groove metal/nu metal group, Skinlab, the following year.

Possessed would disband in 1989 after vocalist/bassist Becerra was shot by two street thieves and left paralyzed from the waist down. In addition, personal and creative conflicts within the band had been described by former members. Mike Torrao would reform Possessed the following year with a different lineup; however, the group would fold once again in 1993.

The 2008 documentary film Get Thrashed attributed thrash's disintegration to grunge's rise after the Clash of the Titans tour. While every band touring the 1990 European segment were veterans of 1980s thrash, a then-unknown Alice in Chains was the opening band on the North American segment in 1991. Death Angel were originally intended by promoters as the supporting act (for their album, Act III); however, in the previous year, a vehicle accident in Arizona left drummer Andy Galeon critically injured, and Geffen Records had dropped the group from their roster after a disagreement on who to replace him; subsequently, the band would dissolve. The same year, Geffen created a subsidiary label, DGC Records, which was responsible for signing Nirvana, who—along with Alice In Chains, Pearl Jam and Soundgarden—epitomized the face of the Seattle grunge phenomena of the early 1990s. Nearly coinciding with Nevermind's No. 1 spot on the Billboards, Exodus would be dropped from Capitol Records and the group would go on hiatus the same year.

Despite lineup shifts and label changes, Testament managed to intercept thrash's slow period by touring Europe and building a new fan base abroad. Sadus bassist Steve Di Giorgio and Floridian guitarist James Murphy (both alums of Schuldiner's band Death) would join ranks with the band, in addition to former or session members of Forbidden, Exodus, and Slayer. However, Murphy would leave Testament after a brain tumor diagnosis in 1999. He had initially replaced founding guitarist Alex Skolnick, who had left Testament in 1993 to explore other musical styles.

Almost in tandem with grunge's receding vogue, and the increasing popularity of alternative rock, nu metal, rap rock, hip hop, and boy bands, MTV's Headbangers Ball (which had showcased music videos of many Bay Area thrash groups in the late 1980s and early 1990s) would be taken off the air in 1995, limiting U.S. output of thrash (in addition to associated metal subgenres like death and black metal) to outlets such as radio shows, carrier current, mailorder, word of mouth, or the Internet.

Out of all bands from the Bay Area metal scene, Metallica managed not only to stay active (despite alcoholism, internal conflicts and a turnover of bassists) but also branch out to the mainstream, even while thrash metal and other 1980s metal styles began to shrink from the public eye. Metallica was the only "big 4 thrash group" not on the Clash of the Titans tour; instead, after the Titans event ended, the band teamed up with Guns N' Roses and Faith No More on two consecutive tours in support of their self-titled fifth album, known colloquially as the Black Album. The record was considered a musical departure from their thrash metal days, showing a direction reared toward modern hard rock, and was attributed (along with Load and ReLoad) as alienating long-time fans. The April 2000 Napster file sharing lawsuits would bring the band further controversy from both the press and fans, considering the process of music trading was a factor in their early success. Since the beginning of the Soundscan era, the Black Album has held distinction as one of the best selling albums of all time; the accumulated Metallica discography currently makes the group the 3rd most financially successful heavy metal band of all time (after Led Zeppelin and AC/DC) and the best selling thrash metal band of all time. The band has sold a total of over 100 million records.

== Revival ==
In August 2001, a small "reunion" of Bay Area thrash metal bands organized Thrash of the Titans, promoted to help Testament vocalist Chuck Billy, who had been diagnosed with cancer, as well as Death's Chuck Schuldiner, who was ailing from a brain tumor. Although Death was based in Orlando, Florida, Schuldiner had relocated the group to the San Francisco Bay Area during the 1980s while pooling a lineup.

The classic Vio-lence lineup (minus Machine Head's Robb Flynn), Death Angel, Heathen, Forbidden (going under their original name, Forbidden Evil), Anthrax, Sadus, Stormtroopers of Death and Exodus were among the performers. Schuldiner died from cancer four months later, and Exodus' singer Paul Baloff died from a stroke the following year. However, Testament's singer, Chuck Billy, survived cancer.

Death Angel and Heathen would reform and record new albums as a result of their reunions for the benefit concert, and Exodus, who had been on semi-hiatus at the time, asked 1980s era singer Steve Souza to rejoin the band after Baloff's death, also leading to a new album.

On July 9, 2005, a "sequel" concert, Thrash Against Cancer, took place, featuring Testament, Lȧȧz Rockit and Hirax, with Death Angel guitarist Ted Aguilar.

== Notable venues ==
=== The Chatterbox, San Francisco ===
- Formerly Graffiti. Hosted early 1980s punk shows.
- NOFX: July 1, 1988
- Hell's Kitchen: February 25, 1989

=== The Fillmore, San Francisco ===
- Exodus & Forbidden: July 14, 1989 (Recorded and released as the live album Good Friendly Violent Fun)
- Testament: 1995 (Recorded and released as the live album Live at the Fillmore)
- Metallica: 2003 and 2011

=== The Old Waldorf, San Francisco ===
Hosted some of Metallica's first shows in the Bay Area.

=== Kabuki Theatre, San Francisco ===
- Metallica, Armored Saint, & Death Angel: March 14 & 15, 1985
- Megadeth and Exodus: May 31, 1985

=== The Farm, San Francisco ===
Exodus and Heathen: July 17 & 18, 1986. These were Zetro's first shows singing for Exodus.

=== The Keystone, Berkeley & Palo Alto ===
At Berkeley's Keystone: Megadeth, April 15, 1984

=== Mabuhay Gardens, San Francisco ===
Located at 435 Broadway in San Francisco, this club held a number of shows for hardcore and thrash bands.

Death Angel, Possessed, and Testament: February 23, 1985

=== On Broadway, San Francisco ===
Open from 1984 to 1985, second floor of 435 Broadway, also called "Rock on Broadway", in the same building as Mabuhay Gardens. Hosted bands such as Attitude Adjustment, Blind Illusion, Control and Heathen. Opened as "Rock On Broadway" by Brent Turner of Mad Reign and then eventually managed by Paul Baloff of Exodus.

=== Ruthie's Inn, Berkeley ===
Prior to, and upon moving back to California, the Texas-born Wesley K. Robinson was immersed in the jazz music scene. While in the Army, was immersed in the New York City jazz music scene, where he met musicians like Pharoah Sanders and John Coltrane. Robinson returned to the Bay Area in the early 1960s. In 1975, frustrated by the commercialism of jazz, Robinson focused on the Bay Area hardcore punk scene and Ruthie's Inn, a small club, on San Pablo Avenue in Berkeley, California to present these bands. By the 1980s, Robinson then became interested in the thrash metal and early death metal bands in the area, and would promote those bands as well.

From 1982 to 1988, the club was an early local venue for Metallica, Megadeth, Death, Slayer, Exodus, Possessed, Death Angel, Testament, Suicidal Tendencies, Vio-lence, Forbidden and D.R.I., in addition to presenting punk rock groups. Cliff Burton had also been a regular in the audience.

The club was eventually converted into a restaurant, Rountree's, in 2002. On December 31, 2006, the venue's original founder, Wes Robinson, died at age 77. In a Berkeley Daily Planet op-ed, Robinson was remembered for focusing on "freshness and originality of the music and passion of its artists rather than the commercial appeal."

In 1982, Bob Baldock, Bob Brown and Don Pretari co-founded Black Oak Books in the Gourmet Ghetto in north Berkeley. In 2008, Gary Cornell, a former math professor at the University of Connecticut, who sold his company, Apress, paid off the IRS and bought the bookstore's name, moved the business to the former Rountree R & B club, and ended business, at the end of January 2016.

=== Aquatic Park, Berkeley ===
From, at least, 1981 to 1984, Wes Robinson held a music festival at Aquatic Park known as "Eastern Front" or "Day on the Dirt". The 1984 Eastern Front featured Suicidal Tendencies, Exodus, and Slayer, which became known as "the Woodstock of Bay Area thrash metal". This show may be an early crossover thrash show.

=== The Stone, San Francisco ===
The Stone is attributed for hosting Burton's first concert appearance with Metallica, and would lead to repeat performances from other thrash acts, such as Megadeth and Dark Angel.

=== The Warfield, San Francisco ===
The 1920s vaudeville theater the Warfield featured a myriad of thrash metal bands during the 1980s and was the exclusive location for Slayer's War at the Warfield video in 2003.

=== The Omni, Oakland ===
- Testament, Vio-lence and Forbidden: May 6, 1988
- Testament and Vio-lence: August 18, 1989
- Death Angel: November 3, 1989
- Death: March 30, 1990

=== San Francisco Civic Auditorium, San Francisco ===
Metallica, Exodus, Metal Church & Megadeth: December 31, 1985.

=== Henry J. Kaiser Auditorium, Oakland ===
Suicidal Tendencies, Exodus, Possessed & Verbal Abuse: July 26, 1985. Show is also known as "Summer Slam".

=== Scottish Rites Temple, Oakland ===
Suicidal Tendencies, Testament, & Forbidden: November 26, 1986.

=== River Theatre, Guerneville ===
Exodus and Testament: January 10, 1986
