= Murder in the Front Row =

- Directed by: Adam Dubin
- Produced by: Rachèle Benloulou-Dubin; Jack Gulick
- Starring: Metallica; Anthrax; Slayer; Megadeth; Exodus
- Cinematography: Eli Adler
- Edited by: Sean Fullan
- Production company: Bonded By Blood
- Release date: April 20, 2019
- Running time: 92 minutes
- Country: United States
- Language: English

Murder in the Front Row is a documentary film which chronicles the 1980s Bay Area thrash metal scene. The documentary premiered on April 20, 2019. Directed by Adam Dubin and produced by Jack Gulick and Rachèle Benloulou-Dubin, the film contains over fifty interviews with various metal stalwarts (including Metallica, Megadeth, Slayer, Anthrax, Exodus, Testament and Death Angel), and is told through a mix of first-person interviews, animation and narration by comedian Brian Posehn. The film was released on DVD and digitally on April 24, 2020.

== Background ==
Dubin directed a few documentaries for Metallica over the years, including their multi-platinum A Year and a Half in the Life of Metallica, Hit the Lights: The Making of Metallica Through the Never, and Freeze 'em All: Metallica in Antarctica, as well as the music video for "Nothing Else Matters". Murder in the Front Row takes its title, from a line from the song, Bonded by Blood, on the album, Bonded by Blood, by Exodus, about a gig at Ruthie's Inn, Berkeley.

== Synopsis ==
The documentary chronicles the history of a community of young kids in Northern California who shared a passion for heavy rock bands like UFO, Iron Maiden, and Motörhead. Most of these bands were from England and rarely toured as far as the West Coast, this group of young people decided to channel their energy and love for the music into forming their own Bay Area thrash metal music scene, including making their own music, creating fanzines, booking clubs (Ruthie's Inn, Berkeley), and swapping tapes.

The film is mainly told through first-person interviews with bands that were integral to the scene including Metallica, Megadeth, Slayer, Anthrax, Exodus, Testament and Death Angel. The members of these recall how the thrash metal scene was formed and relate the events that catapulted this genre into the mainstream. Dubin's experience directing comedy specials for Lewis Black and Jim Breuer, enabled him to add lightness and humor to the film as well. These elements help to authentically tell the narrative as it had unfolded starting in the 1980s and capture the energy and passion the community felt for this genre of music, not just recall the musical history.

One of the film's main goals was to highlight bands who never reached the popularity of bands like Metallica but were just as important and influential to the music scene—particularly thrash forefathers Exodus. Dubin hoped that the movie would inspire its audience to fully appreciate the contributions of Kirk Hammett, who founded Exodus in the Bay Area three years prior to Metallica joining the scene.

== Release ==
Murder in the Front Row had its world premiere on April 20, 2019, at AMC Kabuki 8 theater in San Francisco in collaboration with a follow-up performance by Metal Allegiance at The Fillmore later that night. The film's first festival premiere was at the San Francisco Doc Fest on May 31, 2019. The UK premiere was at House of Vans London and was co-hosted by Kerrang! on June 19, 2019. The Europe premiere was at the Athens International Film Festival (Greece) on September 19, 2019.

== Appearances ==
=== Bands ===
- Testament
- Anthrax
- Slayer
- Megadeth
- Exodus
- Metallica
- Suicidal Tendencies
- Dirty Rotten Imbeciles
- Possessed
- Metal Allegiance
- Death Angel
- Vio-lence
- Forbidden
- Heathen

=== Performers ===
- Alex Skolnick
- Charlie Benante
- Chuck Billy
- Dave Lombardo
- Dave Mustaine
- David Ellefson
- Gary Holt
- James Hetfield
- Kerry King
- Kirk Hammett
- Larry LaLonde
- Lars Ulrich
- Mark Menghi
- Mark Osegueda
- Phil Demmel
- Rick Hunolt
- Robert Trujillo
- Robb Flynn
- Tom Araya
- Tom Hunting
