= Seven Churches (disambiguation) =

Seven Churches may refer to:

- Seven Churches of Asia, mentioned in the Book of Revelation
- Seven Churches of Saint Thomas, a tradition in Indian Christians
- Seven Churches (album), a 1985 album by Possessed, or its title track
