= Revelations of Oblivion =

Studio album by Possessed
- Released: May 10, 2019
- Studios: NRG studios, Titan Studios
- Genres: Death metal; thrash metal
- Length: 54:15
- Label: Nuclear Blast
- Producer: Jeff Becerra

Possessed chronology
Ashes from Hell (2006)	Revelations of Oblivion (2019)

Singles from Revelations of Oblivion
- 1. "No More Room in Hell" Released: March 16, 2019

Revelations of Oblivion is the third studio album by death metal band Possessed. It was released on May 10, 2019 via Nuclear Blast. The album entered the UK Rock & Metal Singles and Albums Charts at #7 and the Billboard Top Current Album Sales chart at #59 in its first week.

It is the band's first full-length studio album in 33 years, preceded by 1986's Beyond the Gates. The album was announced on March 16, 2019 alongside the promotional single "No More Room in Hell".

Per Metalinsider's Metal By Numbers weekly column, the album sold 200 units in its first week.

The album marks the band's first full-length release for label Nuclear Blast, for which they signed in May 2017.

The album's art was created by Zbigniew Bielak; Bielak had previously provided artwork for Absu, Deicide, Ghost, Gorguts, and Paradise Lost.

The album features a host of new additions to the band, featuring only Becerra from the classic 80's lineup. It is the first Possessed album to feature drummer Emilio Marquez and bassist Robert Cardenas of Coffin Texts, guitarist Daniel Gonzalez from Gruesome, and guitarist Claudeous Creamer.

The album also marked the band's first "cinematic" music video in their history. A music video for "Graven", directed by Scott Hansen and featuring a cameo by the band's friend, actor Peter Stormare, was released on May 23, 2019. A live video for the song "Shadowcult" was released the prior April.

"Graven" dates back to 2012, where the lyric was performed under the title "The Crimson Spike" with a different musical backing.

== Reception ==
Professional ratings
Review scores
Source	Rating
Angry Metal Guy	3.0/5 stars
Metal Storm	8.5/10
Distorted Sound Magazine	8/10
The Rock Pit	10/10
Heavy Music HQ	4.5/5 stars
Metal Utopia	9/10

Critics praised the album and Becerra's return, with Blabbermouth calling the album "a monstrous reaffirmation of this absurdly influential band's original ethos that it almost defies belief."

Decibel Magazine praised the mixing of the album, calling Peter Tägtgren's mix "near perfect" and stating that Tägtgren was "able to get the modern edge out of Possessed while also preserving the magic of Randy Burns." Decibel would go on to name the album the 6th best metal album of 2019.

Exclaim! praised the album's original '80s death metal sound but also pointed out the symphonic elements of "Omen" and the technicality of tracks like "Abandoned".

Exclaim! concluded:

Possessed deserve to be spoken of in the same breath as Black Sabbath and Metallica when it comes to influence. Simply put, nobody does this as well as them and probably no one ever will. 'Revelations of Oblivion' was exactly the reminder we all needed.

— Max Morin

== Track listing ==
No.	Title	Length
1.	"Chant of Oblivion"	1:53
2.	"No More Room in Hell"	4:48
3.	"Dominion"	4:25
4.	"Damned"	5:00
5.	"Demon"	5:16
6.	"Abandoned"	5:20
7.	"Shadowcult"	4:43
8.	"Omen"	6:41
9.	"Ritual"	4:47
10.	"The Word"	5:09
11.	"Graven"	4:19
12.	"Temple of Samael"	1:49
Total length:		54:15

== Personnel ==
Possessed

- Jeff Becerra - vocals
- Daniel Gonzalez - lead guitar
- Claudeous Creamer - rhythm guitar
- Robert Cardenas - bass
- Emilio Márquez - drums

Production

- Jeff Becerra - executive production
- Daniel Gonzalez - production
- Peter Tägtgren - mixing, mastering

== Charts ==
Chart (2019)	Peak position
US Top Album Sales (Billboard)	81
US Independent Albums (Billboard)	17
US Heatseekers Albums (Billboard)	2
US Indie Store Album Sales (Billboard)	11
