= Ashes from Hell =

EP by Possessed
- Released: June 6, 2006
- Genre: Death metal, thrash metal
- Label: Boneless Records

Possessed chronology
Agony in Paradise (2004)	Ashes from Hell (2006)	Revelations of Oblivion (2019)

Ashes from Hell is a four-track EP from American death metal band Possessed. It was released on June 6, 2006, purposely (the digits of this date being 06/06/06, the number of the beast) by Boneless Records. A 7" vinyl, that has rare mixes and live performances. Sales of the record were limited to 1000 copies, with the first 100 editions being sold with a guitar pick with the Possessed logo on it along with bassist Jeff Becerra's signature on the back.

Side-A of the vinyl features the two mixed tracks, while side-B contains the live acts.

== Track listing ==
No.	Title	Length
1.	"The Exorcist" (Ashes Edit)
2.	"Confessions" (Rough Mix)
3.	"Death Metal" (Live)
4.	"Burning In Hell" (Live)

== Venues of the performances ==
The songs "Death Metal" and "Burning In Hell" were both performed on September 7, 1985, at Ruthie's Inn in Berkeley, California.
