= Haunting the Chapel =

EP by Slayer
- Released: June 1984
- Recorded: 1984
- Studio: Track Record (North Hollywood, California)
- Genre: Thrash metal
- Length: 13:27
- Label: Metal Blade
- Producer: Slayer

Slayer chronology
Show No Mercy (1983)	Haunting the Chapel (1984)	Live Undead (1984)

Haunting the Chapel is an extended play (EP) released by American thrash metal band Slayer in 1984 through Metal Blade and Enigma Records. Slayer's debut album Show No Mercy became Metal Blade's highest-selling, leading to producer Brian Slagel wanting to release an EP. Recorded in Hollywood, the recording process proved difficult when recording drums in a studio without carpet, although it resulted in drummer Dave Lombardo meeting Gene Hoglan who was to become an influence in his drumming style and speed. It was during the recording of this session that Lombardo first had the double bass added to his kit. Hoglan, working for Slayer at the time, sat at the kit and played a double bass for the first time. Lombardo was impressed and although Hoglan never gave him lessons, he did give him tips regarding the use of the double kick drum.

Although originally featuring three songs, the record evidences a marked evolution from the style of their previous album, Show No Mercy, and is considered the first demonstration of the band's "classic" style displayed on later albums and is often described as a "stepping stone". The songs "Captor of Sin" and "Chemical Warfare" were regularly featured on the band's live set list. "Chemical Warfare" appears in Guitar Hero: Warriors of Rock.

== Recording ==
Slayer's previous album, Show No Mercy, had sold over 40,000 copies worldwide and the band were performing the songs "Chemical Warfare" and "Captor of Sin" live, which made producer Brian Slagel want to release an EP. The album was recorded in Hollywood with sound engineer Bill Metoyer, in a studio with no carpet which was a problem while recording the drums. Slagel was acting as executive producer. Metoyer is Christian and the lyrics from Show No Mercy did not bother him. However, the first words Araya sang when recording Haunting the Chapel were "The holy cross, symbol of lies, intimidates the lives of Christian born", and other anti-religious lyrics; Metoyer thought he would go to Hell for his part in recording the lyrics. These lyrical themes were inspired by the band Venom, who influenced King and was also into the Satanic image.

Slayer drummer Dave Lombardo set his drum kit on the concrete and the kit went "all over the place" while playing. Lombardo asked Gene Hoglan to hold his kit together, while recording "Chemical Warfare", with Hoglan thinking, "I hope he does this in one or two takes, because this is rough." Hoglan was coaching Lombardo how to use double-bass drums to improve his drumming ability and speed; Lombardo asserts Hoglan was "an amazing double-bass player even back then", although it was Hoglan's first time playing the double bass. Eddy Schreyer provided audio mastering and digital remastering, with the cover art design created by Vince Gutierrez. Haunting the Chapel was darker and more thrash-oriented than Show No Mercy, and laid the groundwork for the future direction in the band's sound.

== Touring ==
Hoglan worked as a roadie for the band after their lighting guy did not show up one night, and performed Lombardo's soundchecks. Slayer and Hoglan would play Dark Angel songs during soundchecks, which is how Hoglan eventually joined Dark Angel. Hoglan approached Dark Angel guitarist Jim Durkin: "He came up to me one day and started giving me his criticisms of the band. He said we needed to be more evil. And then he goes, 'By the way, I'm a better drummer than the guy you have in Dark Angel right now.'"

Hoglan was fired as he thought a roadie only did lighting, while vocalist Tom Araya's brother Johnny Araya would do all roadie duties, such as moving equipment, working with sound and lights, and setting up the stage. The band performed a show in Seattle in front of a crowd of 1500, the largest show they performed at the time, supporting Metal Church, and in Texas played with a band also called Slayer in San Antonio. However, it was the San Antonio Slayer's goodbye show.

== Reception ==
Professional ratings
Review scores
Source	Rating
AllMusic	3/5 stars
The Rolling Stone Album Guide	3/5 stars

Although the EP did not enter any charts, Eduardo Rivadavia of AllMusic awarded the EP three out of five stars. Rivadavia said Haunting the Chapel was a "stepping stone" that "offers important clues about this transition period, which saw Slayer's rock-based song structures give way to the non-linear, genre-defining style thereafter regarded as thrash metal's signature sound." The tracks "Chemical Warfare" and "Captor of Sin" are played at Slayer's live shows regularly.

Vocalist Karl Willetts of the death metal band Bolt Thrower asserts the record was an inspiration for the band: "When Slayer's Haunting the Chapel came out I had never heard anything like that before with that style of guitar playing. We were punks and heavy metal was alien to our upbringing. And other bands we heard like Venom, Slaughter and Metallica. So we took the elements of musicianship from metal and the aggression of punk and poured it all together." Chuck Schuldiner of the band Death said the record was "life changing at the time" asserting, "That was some of the early stuff that gave me that push."

The black metal band Perverseraph covered "Chemical Warfare" on a tribute CD to Slayer titled Gateway to Hell, Vol. 2: A Tribute to Slayer. Thrash metal band Equinox also made an appearance on the album covering "Haunting the Chapel". Melodic death metal band At the Gates released "Captor of Sin" on a 2002 re-issue of their 1995 album Slaughter of the Soul.

== Track listing ==
All tracks are written by Jeff Hanneman and Kerry King.

Side one
No.	Title	Length
1.	"Chemical Warfare"	6:02

Side two
No.	Title	Length
2.	"Captor of Sin"	3:29
3.	"Haunting the Chapel"	3:56
Total length:		13:27

=== Bonus track (re-issue) ===
The re-issue features a bonus track previously found on the Metal Massacre Vol. 3 compilation and some vinyl and cassette copies of Show No Mercy

No.	Title	Length
4.	"Aggressive Perfector"	3:28
Total length:		16:55

== Personnel ==
Slayer

- Tom Araya – bass, vocals
- Kerry King – guitars
- Jeff Hanneman – guitars
- Dave Lombardo – drums

Additional personnel

- Slayer – production
- Brian Slagel – executive production
- Bill Metoyer – engineering
- Eddie Schreyer – mastering
- Vince Gutierrez – cover art, cover concept
- Kerry King – cover concept
- Jeff Hanneman – cover concept

== Charts ==
Chart performance for Haunting the Chapel
Chart (2021)	Peak position
German Albums (Offizielle Top 100)	89
