= Victims of Death =

Compilation album by Possessed
- Released: September 15, 1992
- Genres: Death metal, thrash metal
- Length: 33:14
- Label: Relativity/Combat

Possessed chronology
The Eyes of Horror (1987)	Victims of Death (1992)	Resurrection (2003)

Victims of Death is the first compilation album by the American death metal band Possessed. It was released in 1993.

== Track listing ==
No.	Title	Length
1.	"The Exorcist"	4:52
2.	"Pentagram"	3:34
3.	"Swing of the Axe"	3:10
4.	"March to Die"	3:12
5.	"Death Metal"	3:15
6.	"The Eyes of Horror"	3:16
7.	"Fallen Angel"	3:58
8.	"Burning in Hell"	3:10
9.	"Beyond the Gates"	2:55
10.	"Seven Churches"	3:14
Total length:		33:14
