= Emilio Márquez =

American drummer

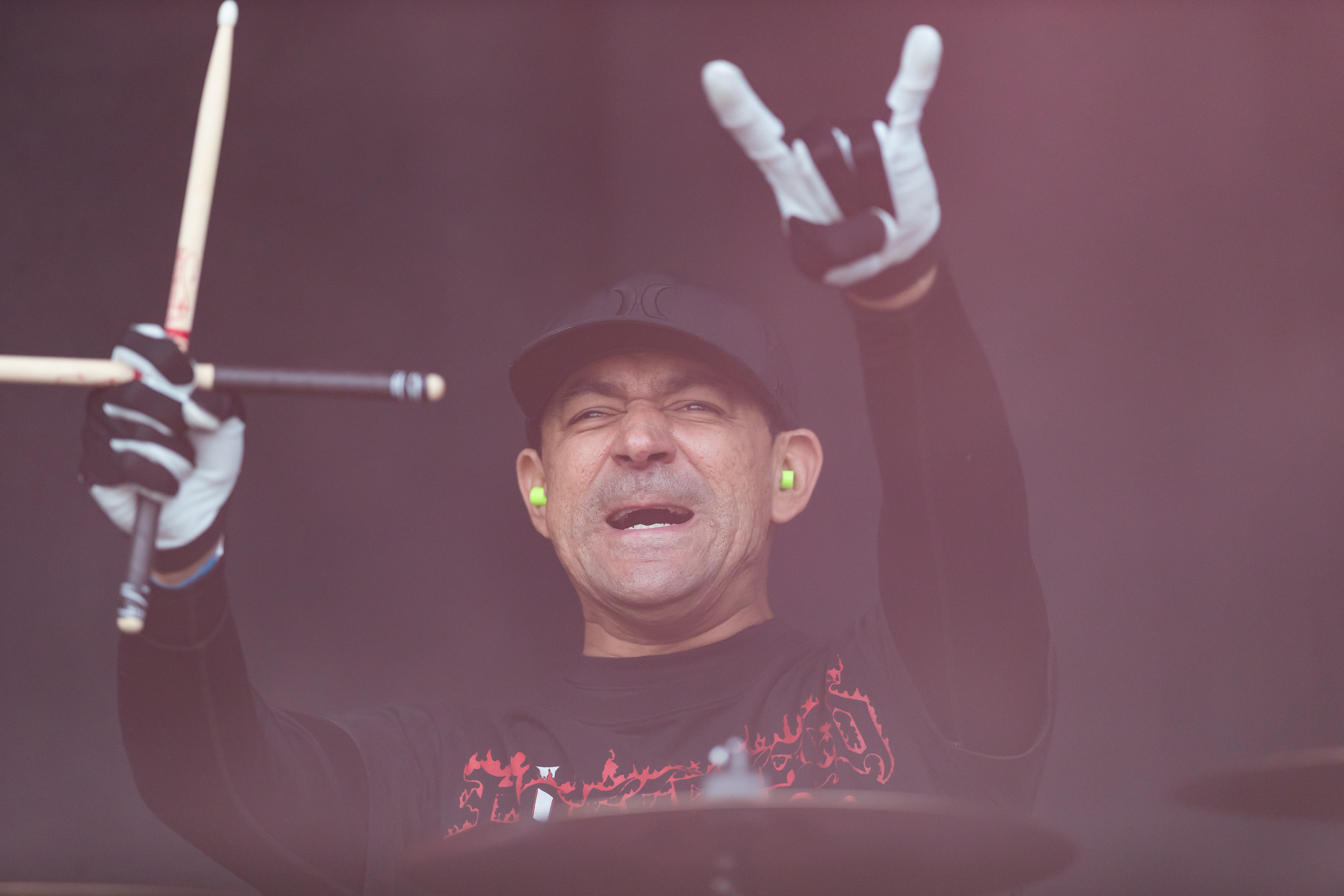
- Márquez in 2017

Background information
- Also known as: El Sadistico
- Born: Los Angeles, California, U.S.
- Genres: Death metal; heavy metal; extreme metal
- Occupation: Musician
- Instrument: Drums
- Years active: 1998–present
- Labels: Odio Records

Emilio Márquez is an American drummer who currently plays in the metal bands Asesino, Engrave, Coffin Texts, and Possessed. He was also the former drummer for Brainstorm (Los Angeles) and Sadistic Intent (1996–2010).

Márquez partially provided the guest voice of Dr. Sepultura's assistant on an episode of the acclaimed animated rock musical comedy series Metalocalypse.
