= Agony in Paradise =

Live album by Possessed
- Released: 2004
- Recorded: 1987
- Genres: Death metal, thrash metal
- Length: 57:02
- Label: Agonia Records

Possessed chronology
Resurrection (2003)	Agony in Paradise (2004)	Ashes from Hell (2006)

Agony in Paradise is a live album from the American death metal band Possessed. The recording took place on January 26, 1987, in Parma, Ohio. It was released by Agonia Records in 2004.

== Track listing ==
No.	Title	Length
1.	"March to Die"	4:14
2.	"Pentagram"	4:00
3.	"Beast of the Apocalypse"	3:43
4.	"Holy Hell"	6:26
5.	"Swing of the Axe"	4:12
6.	"Burning in Hell"	3:48
7.	"Heretic"	3:23
8.	"Phantasm"	4:00
9.	"The Exorcist"	5:39
10.	"Fallen Angel"	3:59
11.	"Seance"	3:33
12.	"Twisted Minds"	7:17
13.	"Death Metal"	4:48
Total length:		57:02
