= Resurrection (Possessed album) =

Demo album by Possessed
- Released: 2003
- Recorded: 1984
- Genres: Death metal, thrash metal
- Label: Agonia Records

Possessed chronology
Victims of Death (1992)	Resurrection (2003)	Agony in Paradise (2004)

Resurrection is a demo album by American death metal band Possessed. It contains a rehearsal from 1984 and a song by Jeff Becerra's new band, Side Effect. There were only 500 copies of the album available that were recorded on 10" vinyl.

== Track listing ==
No.	Title	Length
1.	"Death Metal"
2.	"Evil Warriors"
3.	"Burning in Hell"
4.	"Twisted Minds"
5.	"Fallen Angel"
6.	"Pentagram"
7.	"Swing of the Axe"
8.	"Hemorrhage" (Side Effect Track)
