= Beyond the Gates (Possessed album) =

Studio album by Possessed
- Released: October 31, 1986
- Recorded: March 1986
- Studios: Prairie Sun Recording Studios, Cotati, California
- Genres: Thrash metal; death metal
- Length: 36:46
- Labels: Combat (North America); Under One Flag (UK)
- Producer: Carl Canedy

Possessed chronology
Seven Churches (1985)	Beyond the Gates (1986)	The Eyes of Horror (1987)

Professional ratings
Review scores
Source	Rating
AllMusic	2.5/5 stars
Collector's Guide to Heavy Metal	5/10
Kerrang!	3/5 stars

Beyond the Gates is the second album by death metal band Possessed, released on October 31, 1986 by Combat Records in North America and by Under One Flag in the United Kingdom. Taking a different direction from their debut, Seven Churches, Beyond the Gates has a more technical and, due to poor production, muddy sound.

== Artwork ==
The vinyl release of the album featured an enhanced gatefold-style format: the "gates" of the front cover opened outward, exposing several flaps that opened further to reveal a large, nine-panel illustration of a line of demonic creatures approaching over a desert landscape. Lyrics were included on the inner sleeve.

== Legacy ==
Reception was mixed, with some critics and fans being very disappointed by the album for the sound and production, while others were satisfied with the new direction of the band. Eduardo Rivadavia of AllMusic wrote: "Verily, in most every observer's eyes, Beyond the Gates represented an almost indefensible step backwards; transforming a sound previously distinguished for its inexorable power into a ragged, decidedly weaker-kneed replacement. [...] Taken as a whole, there was no denying that Beyond the Gates packed nowhere near the consistency, inventiveness and, most importantly, eventual influence of its predecessor, signaling the beginning of Possessed's inevitable decline."

Beyond the Gates became a sign of Possessed's decline, as they only released the EP The Eyes of Horror before they officially disbanded the following year. This became the band’s last full-length album, up until the release of their third studio album, Revelations of Oblivion, 33 years later.

Over the years, fans have slowly appreciated Beyond the Gates and have even considered it being an "underrated masterpiece" and "overlooked classic".

== Track listing ==
Published by Take Out Music.

All lyrics are written by Jeff Becerra; all music is composed by Mike Torrao, except where indicated.

Side one
No.	Title	Music	Length
1.	"Intro" (instrumental)	Carl Canedy	1:23
2.	"The Heretic"		2:40
3.	"Tribulation"	Larry LaLonde	4:48
4.	"March to Die"		3:12
5.	"Phantasm"	LaLonde	4:23

Side two
No.	Title	Music	Length
6.	"No Will to Live"		6:47
7.	"Beyond the Gates"		2:55
8.	"The Beasts of the Apocalypse"		3:13
9.	"Seance"	LaLonde	3:03
10.	"Restless Dead"		2:59
11.	"Dog Fight" (instrumental)		1:23
Total length:			36:46

== Personnel ==
Possessed

- Jeff Becerra – bass, vocals
- Mike Torrao – guitars
- Larry LaLonde – guitars
- Mike Sus – drums

Production

- Carl Canedy – producer
- John Cuniberti, Tom Size – engineers
- Tom Coyne – mastering
- Steve Sinclair – executive producer
