= Broken Hope =

American death metal band

- Origin: Chicago, Illinois, U.S.
- Genres: Death metal
- Years active: 1988–2001, 2012–present
- Labels: Metal Blade, Century Media
- Members: Jeremy Wagner; Damian Leski; Mike Miczek; Matt Szlachta; Diego Soria
- Past members: Joe Ptacek; Brian Griffin; Ryan Stanek; Shaun Glass; Dave Duff; Ed Hughes; Sean Baxter; Duane Timlin; Chuck Wepfer
- Website: brokenhope.com

Broken Hope is an American death metal band from Chicago, Illinois.

== History ==
Broken Hope was founded in 1988. They were known as a mid-paced style death metal band with low-pitched growling vocals. They were active for roughly twelve years, recording five albums between 1991 and 1999.

The early lineup of Broken Hope comprised Joe Ptacek (vocals), Jeremy Wagner (rhythm guitar), Brian Griffin (lead guitar), and Ryan Stanek (drums). They signed a deal with the Grindcore/RedLight Label and recorded their debut album, Swamped in Gore. AllMusic reviewer John Book compared Swamped in Gore to Death's 1987 debut album Scream Bloody Gore.

Following the release of Swamped in Gore, Metal Blade Records signed the band, who released their second album, The Bowels of Repugnance, in 1993. The band's third album, 1995's Repulsive Conception, reached CMJ New Music Monthly's Metal Top 25 chart, as did the follow-up, 1997's Loathing, an album that explored political domination, necrophilia, and safe sex.

The band moved to indie label Martyr Records for their fifth album, Grotesque Blessings, released in 1999. Rumors of the band's breakup circulated at this time. This also marks the last album Joe Ptacek played. In April 2002, it was reported by Jeremy Wagner that after being in limbo for about a year, Broken Hope had broken up.

In a 2007 interview, Wagner explained that band dysfunction and a lack of support in Europe from Metal Blade contributed to the split. Wagner added that the band members had met "face to face" for the first time in five years and discussed a possible reunion.

On January 20, 2010, vocalist Joe Ptacek committed suicide. He was 37 years old.

The band reunited in 2012 with returning members Shaun Glass and Jeremy Wagner and new members Mike Miczek and Damian Leski, playing a North American tour with Obituary, Decrepit Birth, Jungle Rot, and Encrust.

Omen of Disease was released September 27, 2013 via Century Media Records.

Former drummer Ryan Stanek died in Wisconsin on March 1, 2015 from a heart attack. He was 42 years old.

Broken Hope's seventh album, Mutilated and Assimilated, was released on June 23, 2017.

== Band members ==
=== Current members ===
- Jeremy Wagner – rhythm guitar (1988–2001, 2012–present)
- Damian Leski – vocals (2012–present)
- Mike Miczek – drums (2012–present)
- Matt Szlachta – lead guitar (2014–present)
- Diego Soria – bass (2014–present)

=== Former members ===
- Joe Ptacek – vocals (1988–2001; died 2010)
- Ryan Stanek – drums (1988–1997; died 2015)
- Ed Hughes – bass (1988–1994)
- Dave Duff – lead guitar (1988–1990)
- Brian Griffin – lead guitar (1991–2001)
- Shaun Glass – bass (1995–1998, 2012–2014; died 2026)
- Duane Timlin – drums (1997–1998)
- Brian Hobbie – bass (1999–2001)
- Sean Baxter – drums (1999–2001)
- Chuck Wepfer – lead guitar (2012–2014)

=== Session members ===
- Ryan Schimmenti – bass (1999)
- Mike Zwicke – bass (1999)
- Larry DeMumbrum – drums (1999)

== Discography ==
=== Albums ===
- Swamped in Gore (1991)
- The Bowels of Repugnance (1993)
- Repulsive Conception (1995)
- Loathing (1997)
- Grotesque Blessings (1999)
- Omen of Disease (2013)
- Mutilated and Assimilated (2017)

=== EPs ===
- Hobo Stew (1993)

=== Other releases ===
- Live Disease (2015)

=== Demos ===
- Broken Hope (1990)
- Demo 2 (1990)
- Demo '93 (1993)
