= The Eyes of Horror =

EP by Possessed
- Released: May 31, 1987
- Studios: Fantasy Studios, Berkeley,. California
- Genres: Thrash metal; Death metal
- Length: 18:04
- Labels: Combat (North America); Under One Flag (UK)
- Producer: Joe Satriani

Possessed chronology
Beyond the Gates (1986)	The Eyes of Horror (1987)	Victims of Death (1992)

Professional ratings
Review scores
Source	Rating
AllMusic	2/5 stars
Collector's Guide to Heavy Metal	6/10

The Eyes of Horror is an EP by American death metal band Possessed. It was released on May 31, 1987. It was produced by guitarist Joe Satriani.

== Track listing ==
All lyrics are written by Jeff Becerra; all music is composed by Mike Torrao.

No.	Title	Length
1.	"Confessions"	2:53
2.	"My Belief"	3:34
3.	"The Eyes of Horror"	3:16
4.	"Swing of the Axe"	3:59
5.	"Storm in My Mind"	4:22
Total length:		18:04

== Personnel ==
- Jeff Becerra – bass, vocals
- Mike Torrao – guitars
- Larry Lalonde – guitars
- Mike Sus – drums

Production

- Joe Satriani – producer
- John Cuniberti, Tom Size – engineers
- Steve Sinclair – executive producer

== Cover versions ==
- Amon Amarth – "The Eyes of Horror" on their 2001 album The Crusher
- Cannibal Corpse – "Confessions" on their 2003 EP Worm Infested
- Sinister – "Storm in My Mind" on their 2001 album Creative Killings
