= Mechanics Bank =

Community bank in California, U.S.

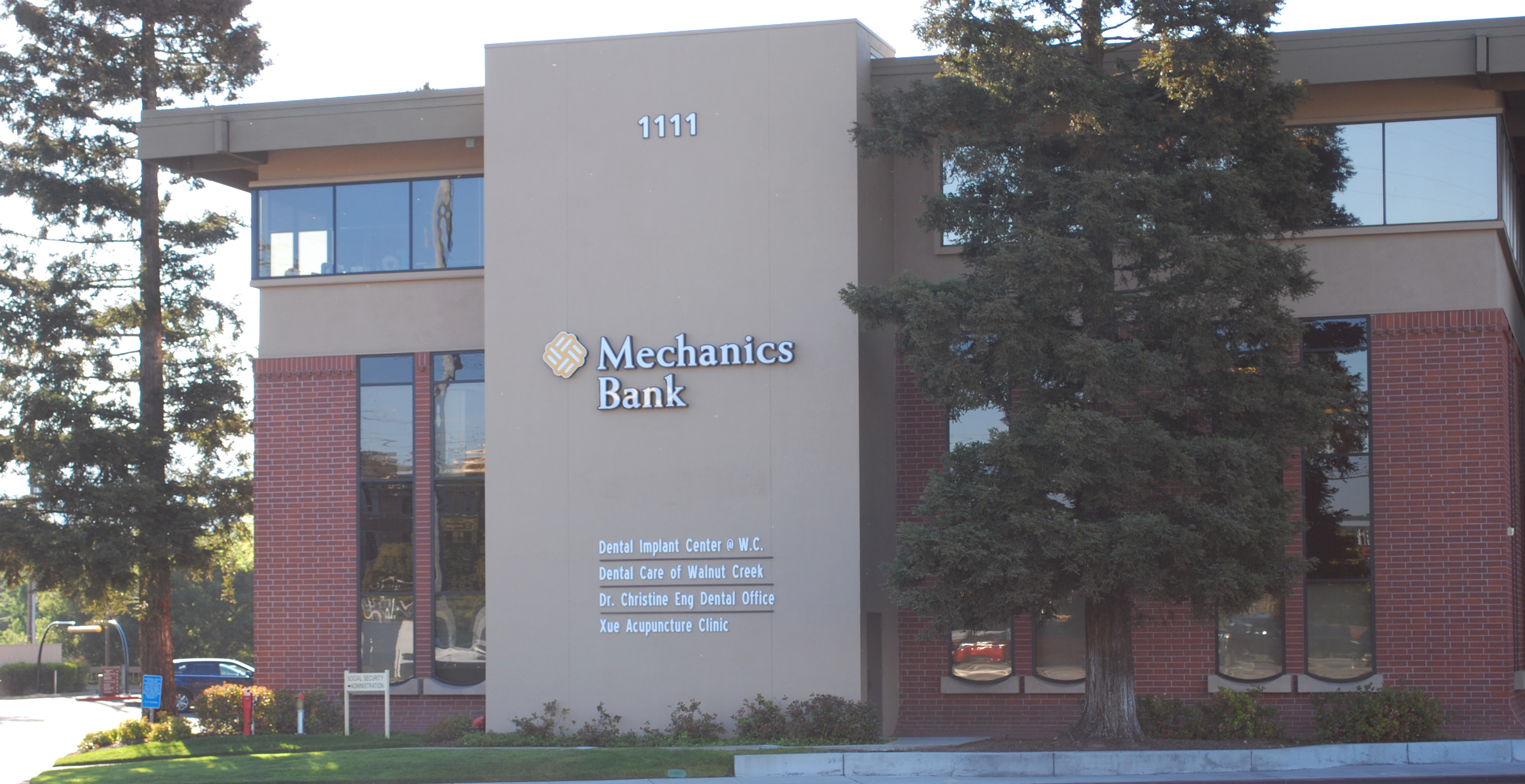
- Mechanics Bank headquarters, Walnut Creek
- Type: Private
- Industry: Banking
- Founded: 1905
- Headquarters: Walnut Creek, California
- Number of locations: 166
- Key people: C.J. Johnson (President/CEO); Carl B. Webb (Chairman); E. Michael Downer (Vice Chairman)
- Products: Financial services
- Website: www.mechanicsbank.com

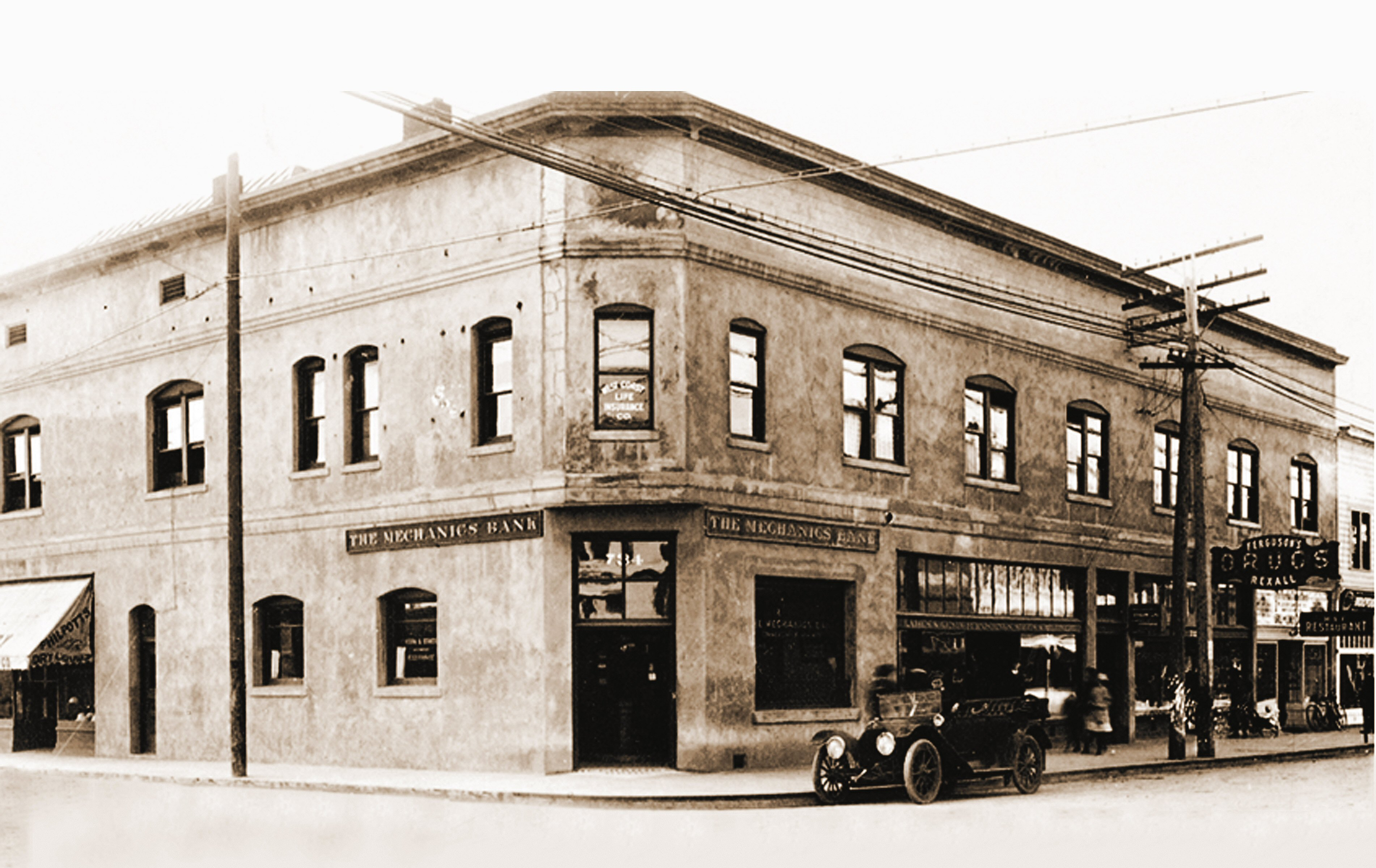
The original Mechanics Bank office at 8th and Macdonald in Richmond, California c. 1907

Mechanics Bank is a full-service community banking financial institution headquartered in Walnut Creek, California. It was founded in 1905 and serves markets throughout the states of California, Washington, Oregon and Hawaii. The bank has over $22 billion in assets and over 1,700 associates at 166 retail branches.

== History ==
Mechanics Bank was originally chartered as The Iverson Bank and Trust Company, founded in Richmond in 1905. It was renamed as The Mechanics Bank in 1907. Shortly after it was renamed, Edward M. Downer joined the organization, and by 1919 he had purchased a controlling interest and soon became president.

E.M. Downer (1869–1938) was a prominent official in the town of Pinole who created the "Bank of Pinole", the precursor to Mechanics Bank. In 1889 at the age of 20 E.M. Downer was appointed as Transfer Agent and Telegrapher for Southern Pacific Railroad's Pinole Depot railroad station. The depot became the town hub and he subsequently opened a laundromat and started The Pinole Weekly Times newspaper. Later the depot was selected as the location for the infant city's first post office and Downer became the first postmaster. After the community incorporated in 1903 he became the first city clerk and afterwards mayor.

The beginnings of the bank were in 1905 when E.M. Downer began offering financial services to his acquaintances from a floor safe in his office. This was a great convenience to the residents because the closest bank at the time was at the Contra Costa County seat at Martinez, 13 miles (21 km) away. In 1915 he became second vice president and later, in 1919 after purchasing a controlling interest, he became president until his death in 1938. He was succeeded by his son E.M. Downer Jr. in 1939 who served as president until 1978.

After starting the Bank of Pinole in 1905, E.M. Downer joined Mechanics Bank in Richmond. The Downer family has led Mechanics Bank through most of its history, starting with E. M. Downer who ran the bank through the 1920s boom years when Richmond was a major West Coast industrial center. Mechanics Bank served Standard Oil, Santa Fe Railroad, the Ford Motor Company and their employees during this period. Downer also successfully led the bank through the Great Depression while many other banks succumbed.

In 1939, E.M. Downer Jr. became president. During World War II Richmond became a major hub of industrial and shipping activities and the bank experienced explosive growth as did Richmond. Over 70,000 new residents were attracted to the city largely to the Richmond Kaiser Shipyards and other World War II home front industries (see Rosie the Riveter National Park).

Mechanics Bank created the first personal, automobile and appliance loans in Northern California in addition to the first drive-in banking operation. From 1941 to 1945, the bank more than quadrupled in size.

E.M. Downer III became president in 1971. In 1980, the Bank moved its headquarters to the Hilltop neighborhood of Richmond, California. In 1990 the bank began expanding outside of Western Contra Costa County, adding offices in Walnut Creek, Pleasant Hill, Concord, Oakland, Marin County, and Napa Valley. This was followed by later additions of Mechanics Bank offices in San Francisco, El Dorado Hills, Elk Grove, Roseville, and Lafayette. In 1995 the bank reached 1 billion dollars in assets. In 2009, in the aftermath of the 2008 financial crisis, the bank refused $60 million in bailout loans from the Troubled Asset Relief Program. The bank remodeled all of its retail locations to be LEED certified as part of an effort to "go green". In 2010, Dianne Daiss Felton (D.D.), the great-granddaughter of E.M. Downer was named chairman of the board. At the same time, E.M Downer's great-grandson, E. Michael Downer, was named vice chairman of the board, and E.M. Downer III (Eddie) was named chairman emeritus.

In September 2014, Texas billionaire Gerald J. Ford acquired 69% of the bank via a tender offer which was accepted.

In 2016, Mechanics Bank completed a strategic merger with California Republic Bank of Irvine, CA.

In 2018, Mechanics Bank completed a strategic acquisition of Scott Valley Bank of Yreka, CA.

In 2019, Rabobank's North American retail operations merged with Mechanics Bank; the combined banks will do business under the Mechanics name.

In 2024, the bank hired its new chief executive officer, C.J. Johnson.

In 2025, Mechanics Bank completed a reverse merger with HomeStreet, Inc. of Seattle, WA. It is now publicly traded under the ticker MCHB.
