= Sadistic Intent =

American death metal band

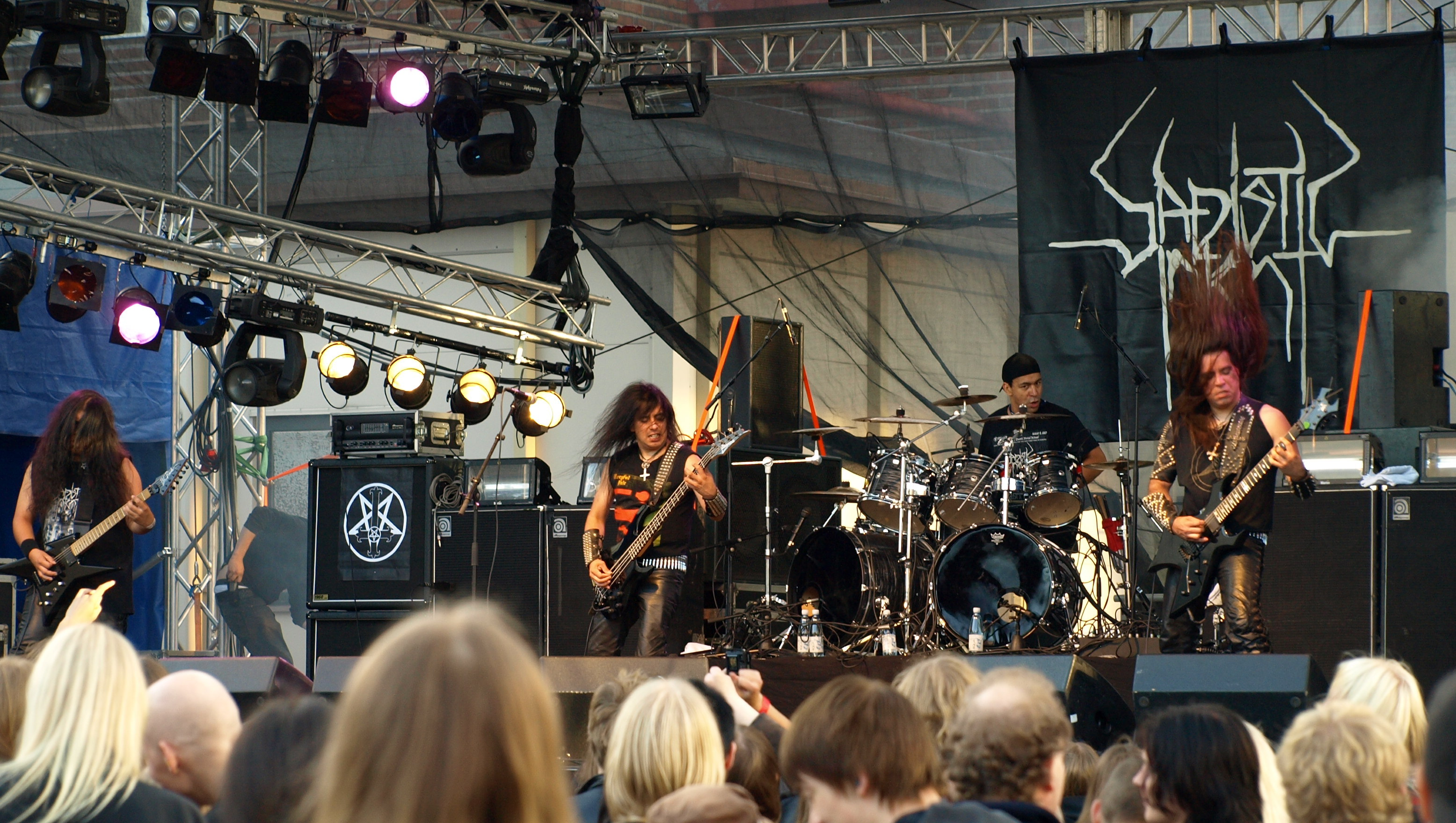
- Sadistic Intent at Jalometalli Metal Music Festival 2008

Background information
- Also known as: Possessed (2007-2010)
- Origin: Los Angeles
- Genres: Black metal, death metal
- Years active: 1987–present
- Label: Dark Realm Records
- Members: Rick Cortez; Bay Cortez; Ernesto Bueno; Arthur Mendiola
- Past members: Emilio Marquèz; Jeff Becerra

Sadistic Intent is an American death metal band from Los Angeles. Active since 1987, it is one of the longest-standing death metal acts in California, and a prominent Latino metal band. As of 2026, the band has never released a full-length album, releasing EPs and splits instead.

== Biography ==
After the demise of Devastation, which formed in 1986, Sadistic Intent began in 1987. The band changed its line-up and released a few rehearsal tapes. In early 1989, they released the Conflict Within demo, which the band distributed through the international underground scene. Sadistic Intent signed with Wild Rags Records. In 1990, the Impending Doom EP was released and a few tours followed in Mexico and the United States. The following year, after disputes with the label, they self-released the limited edition (1,000 copies) 7-inch EP A Calm Before The Storm. Due to line-up problems, the band did not play live until 1993.

In 1994, Sadistic Intent recorded the Resurrection MCD (released through Gothic Records, the re-pressed by Dark Realm Records in 1995) with bassist Bay Cortez singing. After another line-up problem in 1996, they recorded a tribute song to Celtic Frost for Dwell Records. In 1997, they released Ancient Black Earth as a limited edition (500 hand-numbered copies) MCD through their own record label, Dark Realm Records. In 1998, a split 7-inch EP with the German black metal group Ungod was released through German record label Merciless Records. 1999 saw more tribute recordings and releases from Sadistic Intent. One was for a Dwell Records tribute to Slayer, and another for Possessed, which featured original Possessed singer Jeff Becerra. By 2000, Sadistic Intent licensed its Resurrection of the Ancient Black Earth LP to Germany's Iron Pegasus Records, which also released the Morbid Faith 7-inch EP in 2002.

By 2007, Becerra asked founding members of Sadistic Intent Rick and Bay Cortez if they were interested in doing more Possessed songs. It was then that Becerra joined Sadistic Intent, who renamed to Possessed. In 2010, Becerra left the band, who reverted to Sadistic Intent. After that split-up, drummer Nick Barker (Lock Up and Dimmu Borgir) joined Sadistic Intent in 2011. Following the addition of current drummer Arthur Mendiola in 2011, the next Sadistic Intent release was recorded in 2013 and released in 2014, titled Reawakening Horrid Thoughts, a 12-inch laser-etched EP through Iron Pegasus Records.

Sadistic Intent has toured countries such as Norway, Brazil, Finland, Mexico, Germany, Chile, Holland, Italy, Switzerland, Denmark, Greece, Belgium, Australia, Singapore, France and the US.

== Band members ==
Current

- Bay Cortez – bass (1987–present), vocals (1991–present)
- Rick Cortez – guitar (1987–present)
- Ernesto Bueno – guitar (2007–present)
- Arthur Mendiola – drums (2011–present)

Former members

- Enrique Chavez – vocals (1987–1991)
- Joel Marquez – drums (1988–1992, 1993–1995)
- Carlos Gonzalez – guitar (1989–1990)
- Vince Cervera – guitar (1990–2002)
- Emilio Marquez – drums (1995–2010)
- Nicholas Barker – drums (2011)

Timeline

== Dark Realm Records and store ==
Sadistic Intent is linked to the record label and record store Dark Realm Records in Downey, California, since the owners of the store, Bay Cortez and Rick Cortez, are both Sadistic Intent members. The store has been compared to the black metal gathering site and record store Helvete in Norway. The record label of the same name has released Sadistic Intent's albums, as well as albums by Dark Angel, Pentacle, Witchmaster, and Draconis.

== Discography ==
- Conflict Within (demo, 1989)
- Impending Doom (EP, 1990)
- A Calm Before the Storm (EP, 1991)
- Live at the Deathcave (demo, 1993)
- Resurrection (EP, 1994)
- Ancient Black Earth (EP, 1997)
- Eternal Darkness/Phallus Cult (split 7-inch EP, 1998)
- Resurrection of the Ancient Black Earth (Best-of compilation, 2000)
- Morbid Faith (EP, 2002)
- Reawakening Horrid Thoughts (12-inch MLP, 2014)
- Invocations of the Death-Ridden (split 12-inch, 2016)
