= Seven Churches (album) =

Studio album by Possessed
- Released: November 4, 1985
- Recorded: March 30 – April 5, 1985
- Studio: Prairie Sun Studios (Cotati, California)
- Genres: Death metal; thrash metal
- Length: 39:21
- Label: Combat
- Producer: Randy Burns

Possessed chronology
Death Metal (1984)	Seven Churches (1985)	Beyond the Gates (1986)

Professional ratings
Review scores
Source	Rating
About.com	(favorable)
AllMusic	4.5/5 stars
Collector's Guide to Heavy Metal	5/10
Spin	(favorable)

Seven Churches is the debut studio album by American death metal band Possessed, released on November 4, 1985 by Combat Records. Seven Churches is widely regarded as the first death metal album to exist, and About.com named it one of the ten essential albums of the genre.

The album title refers to the Seven Churches of Asia mentioned in the Book of Revelation. "The Exorcist" begins with producer Randy Burns' version of Mike Oldfield's Tubular Bells, performed as it was in the 1973 horror film of the same name. Jeff Becerra and Larry Lalonde were only 16 when the album was recorded.

== Music and lyrics ==
The music on Seven Churches has been characterized as "connecting the dots between thrash metal and death metal." Nick Ruskell of Kerrang wrote: "Faster than Metallica and more evil-sounding than even Slayer, Seven Churches wasn’t simply thrash moved up one more notch, it was a definitive new thing. Death metal had arrived, and though its genesis seems quite cute in hindsight, what Possessed created was a bloody, pointy, and defiantly black-hearted line in the sand." Writing for Decibel, Greg Pratt said Possessed "took the most frantic of thrash metal and brought it to new levels of extremity."

Lyrical themes explored on the album include Satanism. According to Becerra, the lyrics to "Burning in Hell" were written in 1979 or 1980, when he was around 11 years old.

== Background ==
According to David Konow's Bang Your Head: The Rise and Fall of Heavy Metal, the album was recorded during the Spring Break of 1985 when Pinole Valley High School juniors Jeff Becerra and Larry LaLonde had ample time for studio production. Up until the release of the album, the band had practiced at manager Debbie Abono's house in Pinole, but had formed in the El Sobrante/San Pablo area, which was the location of Mike Torrao's and Mike Sus' garage band.

In November of the same year, the band flew to Montreal, Quebec, Canada for the WWIII Weekend Festival in support of the Seven Churches release, playing alongside Celtic Frost, Destruction, Voivod and Nasty Savage; the concert was Possessed's first and largest arena appearance, with nearly 7,000 in attendance.

== Legacy and impact ==
While Florida's Death had released more albums and is also cited as an enduring death metal progenitor, Seven Churches predates the latter band's debut album Scream Bloody Gore by two years. The book Choosing Death: The Improbable History of Death Metal & Grindcore credited bassist/vocalist Jeff Becerra as initially creating the term in 1983.

Seven Churches is considered to be crucial in the development of the death metal style. Additionally, it is also considered by many to be one of the first albums in the genre, which is attributed to interviews with (or literature by) musicians including Kam Lee (ex-Mantas/Death, ex-Massacre), the late Ronnie James Dio (ex-Dio, ex-Black Sabbath) and Steven Wilson (Porcupine Tree). Former Napalm Death drummer Mick Harris said his introduction to metal was Possessed's Seven Churches album, a personal recommendation to him by then-guitarist Justin Broadrick.

Incantation guitarist John McEntee expressed the impact and influence Seven Churches had on him, saying: "When I heard that [album], that really like did something to me where I was just like 'Fuck.' I remember picking it up the first time and not even knowing what the fuck to think. [...] I felt like I had to listen to it more to understand."

In its July 1986 review of Seven Churches, SPIN described the album as belonging to the "sub-mutated genre of death-metal" and being a "full-on Japanese-commuter-train-without-brakes of what this genre should sound like [...] bassist/vocalist Jeff Becerra regurgitates what have to be the most Stygian vocal utterances to date."

British extreme metal record label Earache Records stated that "the likes of Trey Azagthoth and Morbid Angel based what they were doing in their formative years on the Possessed blueprint laid down on the legendary Seven Churches recording. Possessed arguably did more to further the cause of 'Death Metal' than any of the early acts on the scene back in the mid-late 80's."

"The Exorcist" is covered on Cannibal Corpse's 1993 EP Hammer Smashed Face, on Cavalera Conspiracy's 2008 album Inflikted, and on Death's 2011 reissue of their 1993 album Individual Thought Patterns (though Gene Hoglan plays the drums and guitar on it).

In 2011, Chris Dalton of Invisible Oranges called Mike Sus's drumming on the album "one of the worst performances in metal history." He said Sus was "completely unable to keep time, substituting such a skill with a bizarre mish-mash of fills, starts, and stops," adding that "he nevertheless is unable to keep such landmark satanic monuments as 'The Exorcist' and 'Death Metal' from rightfully being considered classics."

In August 2014, Revolver placed Seven Churches on its "14 Thrash Albums You Need to Own" list.

In 2020, Nick Ruskell of Kerrang wrote: "It was th[is] early folly that truly cemented Possessed’s name. Arguments come and go about the definitive start of death metal, but few touch the claim that Seven Churches is the record that did it. It remains a truly superb work of scrappy Satanic majesty."

In 2021, Greg Pratt of Decibel wrote: "This album [is] absolutely a document of total chaos. It was the next step beyond thrash, and looking back on it now, it’s hard to believe this came out in 1985; the heaviest of Slayer or Venom only hinted at what was on Seven Churches. Here, vocalist/bassist Jeff Becerra and his crew laid down next-level extremity."

== Track listing ==
All lyrics are written by Jeff Becerra, except where noted; all music is composed by Mike Torrao, except where noted.

Side one
No.	Title	Lyrics	Music	Length
1.	"The Exorcist"	Torrao	Torrao, Mike Oldfield	4:51
2.	"Pentagram"			3:34
3.	"Burning in Hell"			3:10
4.	"Evil Warriors"			3:44
5.	"Seven Churches"		Torrao, Larry LaLonde	3:14

Side two
No.	Title	Lyrics	Length
6.	"Satan's Curse"	Torrao	4:15
7.	"Holy Hell"		4:11
8.	"Twisted Minds"		5:10
9.	"Fallen Angel"		3:58
10.	"Death Metal"		3:14
Total length:			39:21

== Personnel ==
Possessed

- Jeff Becerra − bass, vocals
- Mike Torrao − guitars
- Larry LaLonde − guitars
- Mike Sus − drums

Production

- Randy Burns − keyboards on tracks 1 and 9, producer, engineer
- Barry Kobrin − executive producer
