= Show No Mercy =

Studio album by Slayer
- Released: December 3, 1983
- Recorded: November 1983
- Studios: Track Record, Los Angeles
- Genres: Thrash metal; speed metal
- Length: 35:02
- Label: Metal Blade
- Producer: Slayer

Slayer chronology
Show No Mercy (1983)	Haunting the Chapel (1984)

Show No Mercy is the debut studio album by American thrash metal band Slayer, released in December 1983 by Metal Blade Records. Brian Slagel signed the band to the label after watching them perform an Iron Maiden cover. The band self-financed their full-length debut, combining the savings of vocalist Tom Araya, who was employed as a respiratory therapist, and money borrowed from guitarist Kerry King's father. Touring extensively promoting the album, the band brought close friends and family members along the trip, who helped backstage with lighting and sound.

Although Show No Mercy was criticized for its poor production quality, it became Metal Blade's highest-selling release. It produced the songs "The Antichrist", "Die by the Sword" and "Black Magic", which were played at Slayer's live shows regularly.

== Background and recording ==
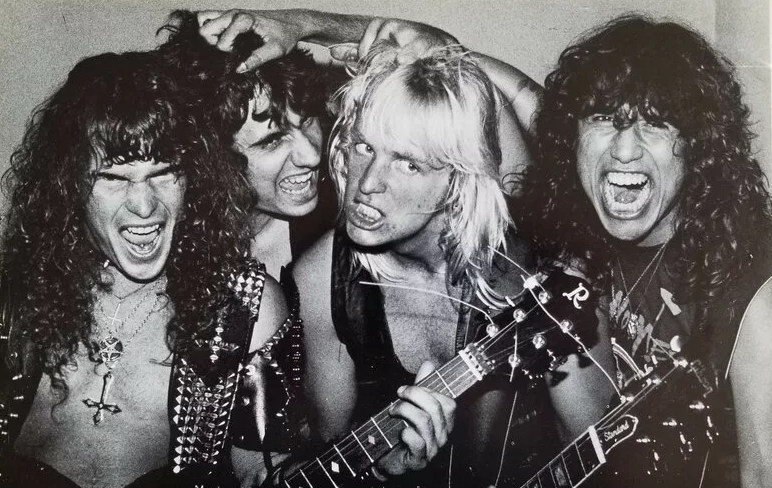
Slayer in 1983. From left: Kerry King, Dave Lombardo, Jeff Hanneman, and Tom Araya

Slayer was the opening act for Bitch at the Woodstock Club in Los Angeles, performing eight songs—six being covers. While performing an Iron Maiden cover, the band was spotted by Brian Slagel, a former music journalist who had recently founded Metal Blade Records. Slagel met with the band backstage and asked if they would like to be featured on the label's upcoming Metal Massacre III compilation; the band agreed. The band's appearance on the compilation created underground buzz, which led to Slagel signing the band with Metal Blade Records. Recorded in Los Angeles, Show No Mercy was financed by vocalist Tom Araya, who used his earnings as a respiratory therapist, and money borrowed from guitarist Kerry King's father. King says the album is "fuckin' Iron Maiden here and there". Vocalist Araya asserts Venom, Judas Priest, Iron Maiden, and Mercyful Fate were big influences on the record, as guitarist King was into the Satanic image.

Lombardo said in 2015 that he was not pleased with how the drums were recorded. The engineer at the time had difficulties getting the right mix between the toms and the cymbals because they were too loud. The solution was to dampen the cymbals with towels and record the toms and cymbals separately. As such, Lombardo called Show No Mercy his least favorite Slayer album, although he emphasized that the songs were great, just not his performance.

Gene Hoglan, later known as the drummer for bands like Dark Angel and Death, provided backing vocals on the song "Evil Has No Boundaries". "Back at the time it was Jeff [Hanneman] and Kerry doing the 'Evil!' You know, it didn't sound too heavy and I mentioned to like Tom or Jeff or somebody like, 'You know you guys should consider...maybe consider doing like big gang vocals on that, make it sound evil like demons and stuff,' and they were like 'Good idea.' But how about now, we got about eight dudes sitting around in the studio, and now everybody jumped up and yelled 'EVIL!!!' So I was like 'Cool' because I'm like, 'I wanna sing on this record somehow, that's how I can do it,' totally unplanned you know?! Sure enough they were like, 'Fuck we have the time, let's do it.' So I was like 'Yeah, I got to sing on it!'" On recording the drums, Slagel wanted drummer Dave Lombardo to play without using cymbals due to the amount of noise they made, as he was unsure if he could siphon the noise out, which he eventually did.

The band used Satanic themes in both lyrics and live performances to gain notice among the metal community and "to fuck with people". The back cover featured 'side 666' and inverted crosses, with Hanneman playing his guitar. Due to the imagery and lyrical content, Slayer received mail from the Parents Music Resource Center telling the band to stop releasing records. Araya comments, "Back then you had that PMRC, who literally took everything to heart. When in actuality you're trying to create an image. You're trying to scare people on purpose." The album produced the songs "The Antichrist", "Die by the Sword", and "Black Magic", which were played at Slayer's live shows regularly.

== Music and lyrics ==
Jeremy Ulrey of AllMusic characterized the sound on Show No Mercy as "basically amounting to a cleaned-up version of black metal stalwarts Venom." The album's lyrics explore themes including Satanism.

== Artwork ==
Simon Young of Metal Hammer said of the album's cover artwork: "This is what happens when rural metal fans think it'll be a laugh to dress their goat in a cape, black swimming trunks and give them a sword. One minute, it's adorable, the next, your livestock is going fucking mental."

== Release and promotion ==
After the album's release, the band went on their first US tour. Slagel gave the band a list of venue addresses and contact numbers. Araya was still working at the hospital and called the members, saying, "Today's the day. Are we gonna do this?" The band knew they never would if they did not tour now. So they set out taking Araya's Camaro and U-Haul. During the first leg of the tour, Slayer had no manager; Doug Goodman, who had met the band when he was first in line for their first show in Northern California (opening for Lȧȧz Rockit) took a vacation from his job at a grocery store to help out on the tour, eventually becoming the band's "tour guide". Goodman now tour manages acts such as Green Day and Beck.

Kevin Reed, a friend of the band, set up the drums and lighting when touring with the band. Reed's father, Lawrence R. Reed, drew the album cover, which depicts Baphomet with a sword on the album's cover. Araya's younger brother, Johnny Araya, who was 13 or 14 at the time, was a roadie who set up the back line and sound. The band hardly made enough money to sustain themselves, only buying the "essentials" such as food, gas, and beer. Araya asserts, "We basically used whatever money we got to get from point A to point B. When we got back, Brian was like, 'So, where's the money?' And we were like, 'What money?' At that time, we didn't realize that you had to ask for money up front. I think he got a lot of money sent directly to him, and we were supposed to pick up the rest."

The band performed in a hotel in Winnipeg, where the basement was the club. Araya comments, "We stayed there for like four or five days, I think. We saw Verbal Abuse play there. Then we played a place in Boston called the Lizard Lounge. In fact, a car had run into the front of the building, and it was all boarded up, but we still played there." When one of the guitarists broke a string Araya would hand them the bass, Hanneman stating, "We'd argue about it, too—like, 'I wanna play bass for a while!'"

== Reception and legacy ==
Professional ratings
Review scores
Source	Rating
AllMusic	2/5 stars
Collector's Guide to Heavy Metal	7/10
Kerrang!	unfavorable
Metal Forces	9/10
Rock Hard	9/10
The Rolling Stone Album Guide	3/5 stars
Sputnikmusic	4/5

Although the band did not have enough time to sell any records while touring, the album became Metal Blade Records' highest selling release. Five thousand copies was the label's average. Show No Mercy went on to sell between 15,500 and 20,000 copies in the United States; it also went on to sell more than 15,000 overseas, as Metal Blade had worldwide rights. The success of the album led to Slagel wanting the band to release a new record and an EP.

Show No Mercy was met with polarized opinions and reviews, mostly negative when it was issued, but in some recent reviews, it came to be considered a classic album. In 1984, Dave Dickson of Kerrang! crushed the album defining it "pure, unadulterated junk", while Bernard Doe of Metal Forces called the record "one of the heaviest, fastest, most awesome albums of all time!" The German magazine Rock Hard gave Show No Mercy a positive review, which remarked how Slayer were "actually the hardest and fastest" in comparison with their contemporaries Metallica and Exciter, and defined their music as "heavy metal punk." AllMusic reviewer Jeremy Ulrey had mixed feelings towards the album, saying that even though the musicianship and production were "amateurish" compared to Slayer's later releases, the album remains a "solid, if inessential, part of the Slayer legacy". Users voted 4/5 at AllMusic. Sputnikmusic staff member Hernan M. Campbell described the album as "fast, heavy, and mean, inducing an inescapable atmosphere of utter atrocity." He noted that the "lo-fi" production quality gives the album a "classic" feeling.

Canadian journalist Martin Popoff praised Show No Mercy for being as "seminal" as Metallica's Kill 'Em All "in defining state-of-the-art speed metal" and for inspiring new bands to "expand the limits of metal." However, he "found the record stiff and one-dimensional", with "its style laid down in stifling arrangements." Fenriz, drummer for Darkthrone, cited Show No Mercy as the inspiration for the band's "current style of fusing NWOBHM with black metal". Terry Butler of Obituary and Death defined the album as "the blueprint for the beginning of death metal" and said: "When I heard Show No Mercy I wanted to play that way....It was a whole new level of mayhem. I wanted to play that way".

System of a Down's Daron Malakian has praised Show No Mercy as an influential album that helped shape him as a person and artist. He claimed he introduced heavy metal to the people of Iraq with this album when he lived there at age 14.

In 2023, Metal Hammer included the album cover on their list of "50 most hilariously ugly rock and metal album covers ever".

== Track listing ==
Side 6
No.	Title	Lyrics	Music	Length
1.	"Evil Has No Boundaries"	Jeff Hanneman; Kerry King	King	3:09
2.	"The Antichrist"	Hanneman	Hanneman; King	2:49
3.	"Die by the Sword"	Hanneman	Hanneman	3:36
4.	"Fight till Death"	Hanneman	Hanneman	3:37
5.	"Metal Storm / Face the Slayer"	King	Hanneman; King	4:53

Side 66
No.	Title	Lyrics	Music	Length
6.	"Black Magic"	King	Hanneman; King	4:03
7.	"Tormentor"	Hanneman	Hanneman	3:45
8.	"The Final Command"	King	Hanneman; King	2:32
9.	"Crionics"	Hanneman; King	Hanneman; King	3:29
10.	"Show No Mercy"	King	King	3:06
Total length:				35:02

Note

- The writing credits for "Metal Storm / Face The Slayer" only apply to "Face The Slayer". No credits for "Metal Storm" appear in the liner notes.

The 1987 re-issue also features songs from the Haunting the Chapel EP.

Bonus tracks (1987 re-issue)
No.	Title	Writer(s)	Length
11.	"Chemical Warfare"	Hanneman; King	6:01
12.	"Captor of Sin"	Hanneman; King	3:27
13.	"Haunting the Chapel"	Hanneman; King	3:57
Total length:			48:27

Bonus tracks (1994 re-release)
No.	Title	Writer(s)	Length
11.	"Aggressive Perfector"	Hanneman; King	3:31
12.	"Chemical Warfare"	Hanneman; King	6:01
Total length:			44:34

Bonus track on some vinyl editions & 1983 cassette edition
No.	Title	Writer(s)	Length
6.	"Aggressive Perfector"	Hanneman; King	3:31
Total length:			38:33

== Personnel ==
Personnel taken from Show No Mercy liner notes, except where noted.

Slayer

- Tom Araya – bass, vocals
- Jeff Hanneman – guitars, backing vocals on "Evil Has No Boundaries"
- Kerry King – guitars, backing vocals on "Evil Has No Boundaries"
- Dave Lombardo – drums

Additional performer

- Gene Hoglan – backing vocals on "Evil Has No Boundaries"

Technical personnel

- Slayer – production
- Brian Slagel – executive production
- Bill Metoyer – engineering, mixing
- Lawrence R. Reed – cover art, cover concept and design
- Steve Craig – cover concept and design, back cover and sleeve photography, logo and pentagram
- Don Cline – back cover and sleeve photography
- Lisa Wickwire – back cover and sleeve photography

== Charts ==
Chart performance for Show No Mercy
Chart (2021)	Peak position
German Albums (Offizielle Top 100)	44
UK Rock & Metal Albums (Official Charts)	26
