= Brian Slagel =

American music executive

- Born: February 14, 1961 (age 65); U.S.
- Origin: Woodland Hills, California, U.S.
- Occupation: Music executive
- Years active: 1982–present
- Labels: Metal Blade Records

Brian Slagel (born February 14, 1961) is an American music executive. He is the founder and CEO of the independent record label Metal Blade Records. Slagel is known for having initiated the Metal Massacre series of compilation albums in 1982, the first of which included the first commercial recording by Metallica. Metal Blade has since released seminal albums by Slayer, Mercyful Fate, Cannibal Corpse, Fates Warning, Amon Amarth and the Black Dahlia Murder, among others.

== Biography ==
Slagel grew up in Woodland Hills, California, and with an early love of heavy music, began working at a rock record store, Oz Records, as a teenager. With the new wave of British heavy metal sweeping the underground metal scene, bands such as Iron Maiden, Def Leppard and Diamond Head were virtually unknown in the US, outside of the tape trading underground. Slagel began importing NWOBHM records, and noticing a public interest in European metal, organized one of the first metal fanzines, The New Heavy Metal Revue. As the fanzine started to pick up steam, Slagel began working as a columnist for Kerrang!, Sounds Magazine, and other music publications.

In 1982, Slagel organized the release of a compilation album, featuring all local Los Angeles metal bands, called The New Heavy Metal Revue Presents Metal Massacre. The album featured the first recordings of Ratt, Steeler, Black 'n Blue, Malice, Avatar, Cirith Ungol, Bitch and Metallica. The album quickly sold all 5,000 copies that were printed, and led to a distribution deal with Enigma Records in 1983. Slagel founded Metal Blade Records in 1982, and released albums by Warlord, Bitch, Armored Saint and Slayer's Show No Mercy, which sold 40,000 copies worldwide.

Metal Blade quickly expanded, signing bands such as Trouble, Flotsam and Jetsam, Gwar, Sacred Reich, and Corrosion of Conformity, and although the label's roster expanded, Slagel ran the company alone until 1988.

With heavy metal's popularity exploding in the late 1980s, many Metal Blade artists began moving to major labels. After the expiration of their distribution deal with Enigma Records, Metal Blade entered a partnership with Warner Bros. Records, who would distribute and market some of the independent label's releases, but Warner was soon bought by Time, Inc, and incorporated into WEA. At the same time, Body Count's "Cop Killer", also released on WEA, was causing controversy, and after public backlash, the band was dropped from WEA. Following Body Count's troubles, WEA introduced new policies regarding controversial lyrics, and attempted to censor Gwar's America Must Be Destroyed. Not wanting to compromise the artistic integrity of any Metal Blade acts, WEA and Slagel parted ways in 1992, with Metal Blade giving WEA the Goo Goo Dolls, and receiving a distribution deal with RED Distribution.
