= Metal Blade Records =

American independent record label

- Founded: 1982; 44 years ago
- Founder: Brian Slagel
- Distributor: The Orchard
- Genre: Heavy metal, extreme metal
- Country of origin: United States
- Location: 5632 Van Nuys Blvd #1301, Van Nuys, California U.S.
- Official website: metalblade.com

Metal Blade Records (often shortened to Metal Blade) is an American independent record label founded by Brian Slagel in 1982 based in the U.S. state of California. The label primarily focuses on heavy metal.

== History ==
Metal Blade Records was founded in 1982 by Brian Slagel alongside its first release, Metal Massacre. Slagel was an employee of Los Angeles record store Oz Records and had launched a metal fanzine known as The New Heavy Metal Revue. He was a fan of New Wave of British Heavy Metal (NWOBHM) and was dedicated to the local heavy metal scene in California, but was also drawn to an underground strain of metal strongly influenced by NWOBHM like Raven and Venom which placed more emphasis on "heaviness" than melodic hooks and "anthem-like choruses". He saw that rock bands with a European influence began increasing in number around Southern California. Inspired by popular NWOBM compilations such as Metal for Muthas, he reached out to several local bands regarding contributing to a compilation that he envisioned as a showcase of "the best metal Los Angeles had to offer." Slagel purchased records for the compilation and contacted distributors who accepted the deal. Slagel received a call from Lars Ulrich—who had not formed a band yet—who asked if he could record a song for the album, which he accepted. Using borrowed money from his friends and family, Slagel pressed either 2,500 or 5,000 copies of Metal Massacre. The first pressing sold out almost immediately, credited to Slagel's work at Oz Records, where the store's independent distributors—Gem, Important, and Green World—purchasing them immediately. Slagel told Billboard that one of the distributors told him if he could provide them records, they would handle the manufacturing and distribution, resulting in Metal Blade's founding. He established a distribution deal with Green World, later known as Enigma, after a short-lived manufacturing and distribution deal with Metalworks. Metal Blade would later be considered as the first label to fully focus on heavy metal.

In 1983, Slayer signed with Metal Blade to release their debut album Show No Mercy which went on to become Metal Blade Records' highest selling release at the time. Five thousand copies was the label's average. Show No Mercy went on to sell between 15,500 and 20,000 copies in the United States; it also went on to sell more than 15,000 overseas, as Metal Blade had worldwide rights.

When death metal first came out, I thought it was a refreshing new genre of music. It made complete sense to me. It was the heaviest thing I'd ever heard, but it was also really, really good. [...] When Slayer and Metallica came out, that was the heaviest thing ever, and eventually that became mainstream, right? I just knew that was gonna happen to death metal [...] it was only a matter of time before it was gonna get popular."

— Brian Slagel, speaking of the label's role during the infancy of death metal

In April 1987, Metal Blade and Enigma Records signed a long-term distribution and development deal, with Enigma promoting and distributing Metal Blade Records artists' records along with distribution through CEMA, a record-label distribution branch of Capitol-EMI. From 1988, to 1993, the label entered into a US distribution and partnership deal with Warner Bros. Records.

During the late 1980s into 1990s Metal Blade signed and overseen the rise of many prominent bands such as Cannibal Corpse, Gwar, Amon Amarth Six Feet Under, Mercyful Fate and King Diamond.

Goo Goo Dolls became the first Metal Blade band to receive a certification from the RIAA; this was a Gold award (and later Platinum award) for the 1995 album A Boy Named Goo.

In 2002, the label celebrated its 20th anniversary with a comprehensive retrospective compilation box set, Metal Blade Records: 20th Anniversary, featuring tracks from releases along with live performances from a Hollywood event with acts like Cannibal Corpse and Armored Saint.

Whitechapel’s 2014, album Our Endless War became the highest charting Metal Blade album on the Billboard 200, peaking at number 10. Multiple Metal Blade artist such as Gwar, Killswitch Engage and As I Lay Dying have received Grammy Award nominations in the Best Metal Performance category.

On January 18, 2017, Metal Blade Records was inducted into the Hall of Heavy Metal History for their large contribution to the Heavy Metal library. Slagel was inducted by special guest Kerry King of Slayer. On August 29, 2017, BMG Rights Management published The Sake of Heaviness: The History of Metal Blade Records, a book on the label's history, co-written by Mark Eglington and the label's founder Brian Slagel.

In 2019, Metal Blade Records opened a store in Las Vegas, Nevada that sold rare and out-of-print items from them and their artists.

In 2022, the Metal Blade Records hosted numerous events in celebration of their 40th anniversary. Three celebration concerts were held, the first headlined by Rivers of Nihil on August 6, Sacred Reich on September 17, and Killswitch Engage on October 5. On August 19, 2023, the Metal Blade Museum opened in Las Vegas, Nevada featuring memrobilla from the labels past.

In 2027, founder Brian Slagel Metal will begin hosting the Metal Blade Records' 45th Anniversary Podcast, where he interviewed various Metal Blade Records artists from the past and present.
