= Let the World Burn (EP) =

EP by Vio-lence
- Released: March 4, 2022
- Recorded: January–April 2021
- Studios: Trident Studios, Pacheco, California
- Genre: Thrash metal
- Length: 24:47
- Label: Metal Blade Records
- Producer: Juan Urteaga

Vio-lence chronology
Nothing to Gain (1993)	Let the World Burn (2022)

Singles from Let the World Burn
- 1. "Flesh from Bone" Released: January 10, 2022; 2. "Let the World Burn" Released: February 11, 2022

Let the World Burn is an EP by the American thrash metal band Vio-Lence, released on March 4, 2022, by Metal Blade Records. It is the band's first material of any kind since their initial disbandment in 1994, and their first EP since Torture Tactics (1991). The EP is also Vio-lence's first studio recording to feature a different lineup, with bassist Christian Olde Wolbers and guitarist Bobby Gustafson replacing Deen Dell and Robb Flynn respectively, and three-fifths of the Eternal Nightmare lineup – guitarist Phil Demmel, vocalist Sean Killian and drummer Perry Strickland – remaining. This is also the band's only recording to feature Gustafson, whom the band parted ways with in 2022, and Wolbers, who departed the band in 2025; it is also their final recording to feature Strickland and Demmel before their departures from the band in January 2023 and February 2024, respectively.

== Background ==
Vio-lence's third and final studio album to date, Nothing to Gain, was recorded in August 1990 – about a month after the release of Oppressing the Masses – but not released until December 1993. The album received mixed to negative reviews, and unlike their previous two albums (Eternal Nightmare and Oppressing the Masses), the band never toured in support of it. By that point, Vio-lence was at a crossroads, with rhythm & lead guitarist Robb Flynn having left in 1992 in order to focus on then-new band Machine Head, and drummer Perry Strickland would also leave the band about a year later; the duo were replaced by Ray Vegas and Mark Hernandez respectively. After performing a series of shows around the Bay Area with this lineup, as well as several aborted attempts to record a fourth studio album, Vio-lence officially disbanded in 1994, and four-fifths of the band's last lineup at the time continued to collaborate under the name Torque, with guitarist Phil Demmel also taking over on vocals, and they released their only studio album in 1996 as an eponymous.

In August 2001, Vio-lence reunited for their first show in eight years at the Thrash of the Titans festival, which was held as a co-benefit for the band's close friends Chuck Billy of Testament and Chuck Schuldiner of Death, who were both battling cancer. This was originally intended as a one-off show, but after its success, Vio-lence decided to resume activity as a band and spent much of 2002 and early 2003 playing shows around the West Coast, in addition to an appearance at the Milwaukee Metalfest in the summer of 2002 with Exodus, who had also reunited for the Thrash of the Titans benefit. The band was also considering recording new material, but nothing came out of it, and Vio-lence disbanded after playing a farewell show at The Pound in San Francisco on April 19, 2003, after which Demmel reunited with Flynn in Machine Head, where the former would remain until his departure from the band in 2018.

A near-reunion of Vio-lence took place at The Midway in San Francisco, California on January 20, 2018, as a benefit concert for frontman Sean Killian, who had recently been diagnosed with stage four liver cirrhosis earlier. The benefit included performances by the members of Vio-Lence and their Bay Area thrash metal peers Testament, Exodus, Death Angel, Forbidden and Mordred. Following Demmel's departure from Machine Head and Killian's recovery from his illness, as well as months of speculation of a potential Vio-lence reunion, the band announced on January 8, 2019, that their first show in over fifteen years would take place on April 13 at the Metro in Oakland, which would see them perform the Eternal Nightmare album in its entirety. Initially planned as a one-off show, it sold out shortly after its announcement, resulting in a matinee appearance at the Metro, which took place on the following day. Vio-lence spent the rest of 2019 playing a series of US shows as well as their first-ever appearance in Europe, where they played the Alcatraz Metal Fest in Belgium.

Vio-lence's intention to write a follow-up to Nothing to Gain was revealed in August 2019, when Demmel told Australia's Heavy magazine that, "Sean's itching to write some new music. I'm not itching as hard. I've got a lot on my plate. Vio-lence is definitely a priority, but that's just a step I haven't... It's hard, because you have this comeback, and then you play the songs, and you want to be good. I don't want to put out something that isn't as good as Eternal Nightmare or some of the songs from Oppressing. I want to have something that's quality." In an interview with Exodus frontman Steve "Zetro" Souza on his "Toxic Vault" video channel, Killian said, "Phil and I have talked a couple of times. It's kind of up to him because he is very busy doing a soundtrack for a video game and I guess a Netflix series, and he's doing Allegiance and these other things he's doing." Killian also said that the other members of Vio-lence were interested in writing a new album; however, he concluded that "it's Phil and I that need to connect."

In January 2020, just as the band was preparing to work on new material, it was announced that Ray Vegas had left Vio-lence and he was replaced by former Overkill guitarist Bobby Gustafson; shortly thereafter, longtime bassist Deen Dell had quit the band for personal reasons and was replaced by former Fear Factory bassist Christian Olde Wolbers. In March 2020, it was announced that Vio-lence had signed to Metal Blade Records and the band was going to record a new EP in the coming months. In August of that year, the band released its first song in more than two decades, which was a cover of Dead Kennedys' "California über alles". By October 2020, Vio-lence had finished writing four songs for a five-song EP that they had planned to release sometime in 2021. On January 18, 2021, the band entered Trident Studios in Pacheco, California to begin recording their new EP with producer Juan Urteaga, and the sessions were finished on April 24 in time for its planned summer release; however, its release was later pushed back to late 2021. On June 16, Vio-lence announced Let the World Burn as the title of the EP, although its release was once again delayed to early 2022.

On January 10, 2022, a lyric video for "Flesh from Bone" was released, and on the same day, the band announced that Let the World Burn would be released on March 4. A month later, the EP's second single "Let the World Burn" was released to streaming platforms.

== Track listing ==
No.	Title	Length
1.	"Flesh from Bone"	5:02
2.	"Screaming Always"	5:24
3.	"Upon Their Cross"	5:27
4.	"Gato Negro"	3:44
5.	"Let the World Burn"	5:10
Total length:		24:47

== Personnel ==
- Sean Killian – lead vocals
- Phil Demmel – guitars
- Bobby Gustafson – guitars
- Christian Olde Wolbers – bass
- Perry Strickland – drums

== Charts ==
Chart performance for Let the World Burn
Chart (2022)	Peak position
UK Album Downloads (Official Charts)	98
