= Darkness Within (song) =

Single by Machine Head

from the album Unto the Locust
- Released: July 31, 2012
- Genre: Groove metal, alternative metal
- Length: 6:28 (4:50 for radio)
- Label: Roadrunner
- Songwriters: Robb Flynn, Dave McClain and Phil Demmel
- Producer: Robb Flynn

Machine Head singles chronology
"Locust" (2011)	"Darkness Within" (2012)	"Killers & Kings" (2014)

Music video
- "Darkness Within" on YouTube

Professional ratings
Review scores
Source	Rating
Loudwire	5/5 stars

"Darkness Within" is a single by American heavy metal band Machine Head, from the 2011 album Unto the Locust. It peaked at No. 35 on the Billboard Mainstream Rock chart, the band's first entry and highest position.

== Track listing ==
No.	Title	Length
1.	"Darkness Within" (Edit)	4:50
2.	"Darkness Within" (Acoustic)	5:05
3.	"Darkness Within" (Album version)	6:28

== Music video ==
The video for "Darkness Within" was filmed in Prague, Czech Republic. Guitarist and vocalist Robb Flynn explained this choice:

"The first time I visited Prague was on the Burn My Eyes tour cycle in 1994 as support to Slayer. I'll never forget the city. I was blown away, I'd never seen anything like it before or since. The baroque and gothic architecture, the religious symbolism everywhere, the Charles Bridge, St. Vitus's cathedral, but also the Eastern Block feel it still carried, it was one of the most unique and beautiful cities I'd ever seen and still is. And yet, it had a dark underbelly to it that ran through her streets. Heroin use was open and rampant back then, and having dabbled in that, and having had friends who did more than dabble, I was all too aware of it. But there was something about that that charmed me. That there could be that dark side within such a beautiful, religious place. I said right there and then, 'I want to do a video here someday.'"

The song won Metal music video of the year at the 2012 Loudwire Music Awards.

== Personnel ==
- Robb Flynn – lead vocals, rhythm guitar, acoustic guitar
- Adam Duce – bass, backing vocals
- Dave McClain – drums
- Phil Demmel – lead guitar
