= Jackson Phil Demmel Demmelition V =

The Demmelition King V is the signature guitar of Phil Demmel, the lead guitarist of the American heavy metal band Machine Head. The Demmelition King V model was released on 5 May 2008 by Jackson Guitars. It was designed in part by Phil Demmel and Jackson says that, "it is a superb addition to the King V dynasty."

The Demmelition King V has the line’s classic sharp V-shaped alder body, with a more aggressive edge thanks to its additional cutouts and set up for the low-tuned brutal player. Its through-body, quick-action, quartersawn maple neck features a bound compound-radius ebony fingerboard (12” to 16”) with 24 jumbo frets, mother-of-pearl shark fin position inlays and black-bound headstock with an inlaid mother-of-pearl Jackson logo. The barrage comes from an EMG 81 bridge pickup and an EMG 60 neck pickup (EMG, Inc.), each with its own CTS volume control and both controlled by a three-way Switchcraft switch. Other features include a Floyd Rose Original double-locking two-point tremolo bridge, which comes tuned to Demmel's preferred tuning; Dropped B tuning. It also features black hardware and die-cast tuners. It's available in red with black bevels, black with silver bevels, and white with black bevels.

In North America, this model (regardless of finish) usually retails for approximately $1,299 and in Europe, it can retail for approximately £900.
