= Eternal Nightmare (Vio-lence album) =

Studio album by Vio-lence
- Released: June 27, 1988
- Recorded: February–April 1988
- Genre: Thrash metal
- Length: 35:23
- Label: Mechanic Records
- Producer: John Cuniberti

Vio-lence chronology
Eternal Nightmare (1988)	Oppressing the Masses (1990)

Professional ratings
Review scores
Source	Rating
AllMusic	3/5 stars
Blabbermouth.net	8/10 stars

Eternal Nightmare is the debut album by the San Francisco Bay Area thrash metal band Vio-lence, released on June 27, 1988 through MCA Records' Mechanic sublabel.

It is considered to be an essential release in the genre by Revolver. The song "Serial Killer" is considered a fan favorite.

== Release history ==
It was released on June 27, 1988 through MCA Records' Mechanic sublabel. A limited 10" promo single was released, featuring two tracks, 'Eternal Nightmare' and 'Phobophobia.'; the release was quite unique, as it came in a "vomit pack", a sealed plastic cover containing fake vomit. Shortly after, thrash metal innovators Slayer released a single in a similar format but with fake blood, and rock band The Revolting Cocks released a single with fake semen.

The 2005 re-release of the album includes a bonus CD of the Thrash of the Titans concert (benefit for Testament singer Chuck Billy), recorded August 11, 2001. As of 2023, other than the EPs Torture Tactics and Let the World Burn, this is the only Vio-lence studio album to have been made available on digital streaming services.

== Music ==
The album's sound has drawn comparisons to Exodus, Death Angel and Testament. Revolver stated that some of the arrangements on the album are progressive.

== Track listing ==
All songs written by Sean Killian, Phil Demmel and Robb Flynn.

No.	Title	Length
1.	"Eternal Nightmare"	6:10
2.	"Serial Killer"	2:58
3.	"Phobophobia"	6:31
4.	"Calling in the Coroner"	3:55
5.	"T.D.S. (Take It as You Will)"	5:04
6.	"Bodies on Bodies"	5:47
7.	"Kill on Command"	4:56

Bonus disc

No.	Title	Length
1.	"Liquid Courage [Live]"	6:26
2.	"Ageless Eyes [Live]"	4:23
3.	"Calling in the Coroner [Live]"	4:13
4.	"World in a World [Live]"	4:53
5.	"Officer Nice [Live]"	5:21
6.	"Subterfuge [Live]"	4:45
7.	"Kill on Command [Live]"	5:23
8.	"Phobophobia [Live]"	6:38
9.	"Bodies on Bodies [Live]"	7:39
10.	"I Profit [Live]"	7:29
11.	"T.D.S. (Take It as You Will) [Live]"	5:27
12.	"Paraplegic [Live]"	5:08

== Personnel ==
- Sean Killian – lead vocals
- Phil Demmel – guitar, backing vocals
- Robb Flynn – guitar, backing vocals
- Deen Dell – bass, backing vocals
- Perry Strickland – drums

Production

- Produced, recorded, engineered, edited and mixed by John Cuniberti
- Second engineers: Casey McMakin and David Plank
