= Nothing to Gain =

Studio album by Vio-lence
- Released: November 1993
- Recorded: August 1990
- Genre: Thrash metal
- Length: 45:08
- Label: Bleeding Hearts
- Producer: Michael Rosen

Vio-lence chronology
Torture Tactics (1991)	Nothing to Gain (1993)	Let the World Burn (2022)

1997 reissue

Professional ratings
Review scores
Source	Rating
AllMusic	2.5/5 stars

Nothing to Gain is the third and most recent full-length studio album by San Francisco Bay Area thrash metal band Vio-lence. The album was recorded in August 1990 but was not released until 1993, and is the last to feature guitarist Robb Flynn (who had left the band to form Machine Head by the time of its release) and bassist Deen Dell. This was also their last work as a band to contain new material for over 28 years, until the release of Let the World Burn in March 2022. Nothing to Gain was re-released in 1997 with a different cover. As of 2023, this is one of the two Vio-lence studio albums (along with Oppressing the Masses) to have never been made available on digital services worldwide.

There were two additional songs recorded during the album's sessions ("All Good Dies" and "Put Them In"), which did not make the final album and which still remain unreleased.

== Track listing ==
No.	Title	Length
1.	"Atrocity"	5:02
2.	"Twelve Gauge Justice"	4:47
3.	"Ageless Eyes"	4:10
4.	"Pain of Pleasure / Virtues of Vice"	5:46
5.	"Killing My Words"	4:22
6.	"Psychotic Memories"	5:24
7.	"No Chains"	5:03
8.	"Welcoming Party / This Is System"	6:55
9.	"Colour of Life"	3:40

== Credits ==
- Sean Killian – lead vocals
- Phil Demmel – guitars
- Robb Flynn – guitars
- Dean Dell – bass
- Perry Strickland – drums
