= Category 7 (band) =

American heavy metal band

- Genres: Heavy metal, thrash metal
- Years active: 2023–present
- Label: Metal Blade Records
- Spinoff of: Metal Allegiance
- Members: John Bush; Phil Demmel; Mike Orlando; Jack Gibson; Jason Bittner

Category 7 is an American heavy metal supergroup formed in 2023. The lineup features Armored Saint and former Anthrax frontman John Bush, Kerry King sideman and former Machine Head guitarist Phil Demmel, Adrenaline Mob guitarist Mike Orlando, Exodus bassist Jack Gibson, and Shadows Fall and former Overkill drummer Jason Bittner.

== History ==
Category 7 was put together in early 2023 as a result of the members "hanging out and tearing it up", with Bush and Demmel having collaborated earlier in Metal Allegiance. The project was named "after the numerical designation for the most powerful wind storms" and "came together from a batch of musicians who strived to play music they loved and weren't hearing elsewhere, and wanted to do so with bandmates they enjoyed being with."

Details of Category 7 were revealed on April 10, 2024, and it was reported that they had signed to Metal Blade Records. On May 2, 2024, the band released "In Stitches" as the lead single off their upcoming self-titled debut album, released on July 26. On July 2, 2024, the official music video was released for the single "Mousetrap".

== Band members ==
- John Bush – vocals
- Phil Demmel – guitars
- Mike Orlando – guitars
- Jack Gibson – bass
- Jason Bittner – drums

== Discography ==
- Category 7 (2024)
