= BPMD =

American rock supergroup

- Genres: Hard rock, heavy metal
- Years active: 2019–present
- Labels: Napalm Records
- Spinoff of: Metal Allegiance
- Members: Bobby "Blitz" Ellsworth; Phil Demmel; Mark Menghi; Mike Portnoy

BPMD is an American hard rock/heavy metal supergroup. Formed in 2019, the band plays cover songs of classic American rock bands of the 1970s. The band consists of Overkill singer Bobby "Blitz" Ellsworth, former Vio-lence and Machine Head guitarist Phil Demmel, and two members of Metal Allegiance – bassist Mark Menghi and drummer Mike Portnoy.

== History ==
BPMD was conceived in the summer of 2019 when Ellsworth, Demmel, Menghi and Portnoy teamed up to record an album featuring covers of 1970s songs, titled American Made. In a January 2020 interview on The Blairing Out with Eric Blair Show, Demmel revealed that the project would be called BPMD, in reference to three of the members' last names as well as Ellsworth's nickname Blitz.

American Made was released on June 12, 2020 through Napalm Records and includes ten song covers.

== Musical style ==
About the project, Demmel said: "It's all cover tunes from American bands of the '70s. It's called American Made, [and it's got songs from] ZZ Top, Lynyrd Skynyrd, James Gang, Aerosmith, Grand Funk Railroad — all these cover tunes that we modernized them and not really thrashed them up, but we made kind of metal versions of them."

== Discography ==
- American Made (2020)
