= Unatoned =

Studio album by Machine Head
- Released: April 25, 2025
- Recorded: 2024
- Studios: Robb's Jam Room, Oakland, California; Sharkbite Studios, Oakland, California
- Genres: Groove metal, alternative metal
- Length: 41:38
- Labels: Nuclear Blast; Imperium
- Producers: Robb Flynn; Zack Ohren

Machine Head chronology
Of Kingdom and Crown (2022)	Unatoned (2025)

Singles from Unatoned
- 1. "These Scars Won't Define Us" Released: November 15, 2024; 2. "Unbound" Released: February 18, 2025; 3. "Bonescraper" Released: April 4, 2025

Unatoned (stylized as UNATØNED) is the eleventh studio album by American heavy metal band Machine Head, released on April 25, 2025, through Nuclear Blast and Imperium Recordings. It is the band's only album to feature Reece Scruggs on guitar who joined the band in 2024 and left in October 2026.

At 41 minutes, Unatoned is Machine Head's shortest album.

== Background and promotion ==
On February 17, 2024, Wacław Kiełtyka announced he had left Machine Head, explaining that Decapitated is his 'absolute No. 1 band' and that Decapitated and Machine Head are both active bands with overlapping tours, creating important scheduling conflicts. In November 2024, the band announced a North American tour for 2025 with In Flames, Lacuna Coil and Unearth as support acts, and released a single, "These Scars Won't Define Us", which featured vocals from all of those bands in what Machine Head described as a "Wu Tang Clan-level thrash collaboration" (the album version does not include vocals from those bands); in doing so, the band announced its eleventh studio album. The album's title, Unatoned, and release date of April 25 were announced in February, along with a second single, "Unbound", and an accompanying music video; the album will be the band's first to feature Scruggs, who was being treated as a full member of the band by December.

== Reception ==
Professional ratings
Review scores
Source	Rating
Angry Metal Guy	2/5
Blabbermouth.net	7.5/10
Distorted Sound	7/10
Kerrang!	3/5
Metal.de	7/10
Metal Hammer	4.5/5 stars
Sputnikmusic	2.3/5

Unatoned received generally positive reviews from music critics upon release. Dan McHugh of Distorted Sound gave it a score of 7/10, writing "UNATØNED may not be Machine Head's finest hour but it is certainly loaded with plenty of exciting moments that will grab your attention and encourage repeat listens." Angry Metal Guy were more negative, giving it a score of 2.0/5 and stating "With solid cuts in the front and lazy ones in the back, UnatØned is an unbalanced mish-mash of singles and filler pieces."

== Track listing ==
All track titles are stylized in all caps, and every letter "o" is written as "ø"; for example, "Unbound" is stylized as "UNBØUND".

No.	Title	Writer(s)	Length
1.	"Landscape of Thorns"	Robb Flynn	0:31
2.	"Atomic Revelations"	Flynn; Reese Scruggs	3:41
3.	"Unbound"	Flynn	3:56
4.	"Outsider"	Flynn	3:56
5.	"Not Long for This World"	Flynn; Jared MacEachern; Scruggs	3:30
6.	"These Scars Won't Define Us"	Flynn	3:32
7.	"Dustmaker"	Flynn	2:10
8.	"Bonescraper"	Flynn	3:34
9.	"Addicted to Pain"	Flynn; MacEachern; Scruggs	3:10
10.	"Bleeding Me Dry"	Flynn; MacEachern; Scruggs	5:36
11.	"Shards of Shattered Dreams"	Flynn; MacEachern; Scruggs	3:28
12.	"Scorn"	Flynn; Scruggs	4:16
Total length:			41:38

== Personnel ==
Machine Head

- Robb Flynn – lead vocals, rhythm guitar
- Reese Scruggs – lead guitar
- Jared MacEachern – bass, backing vocals
- Matt Alston – drums, percussion

Production

- Robb Flynn – production
- Zack Ohren – production, engineering
- Colin Richardson – mixing
- Chris Clancy – mixing, engineering
- Ted Jensen – mastering
- Jordan Fish – post-production
- Joel Wanasek – post-production
- Olav Tabatabai – additional engineering
- Seth Siro Anton – artwork

== Charts ==
Chart performance for Unatoned
Chart (2025)	Peak position
Austrian Albums (Ö3 Austria)	3
Belgian Albums (Ultratop Flanders)	42
Belgian Albums (Ultratop Wallonia)	29
Finnish Albums (Suomen virallinen lista)	44
French Albums (SNEP)	43
French Rock & Metal Albums (SNEP)	4
German Albums (Offizielle Top 100)	5
Portuguese Albums (AFP)	99
Scottish Albums (Official Charts)	13
Swiss Albums (Schweizer Hitparade)	7
Spanish Albums (Promusicae)	93
UK Albums (Official Charts)	71
UK Independent Albums (Official Charts)	6
UK Rock & Metal Albums (Official Charts)	2
