= Road to Bloodshed =

Studio album by Sanctity
- Released: April 24, 2007
- Recorded: Audiohammer Studio in Sanford, Florida
- Genre: Thrash metal, groove metal, heavy metal
- Length: 45:27
- Label: Roadrunner
- Producer: Jason Suecof

Professional ratings
Review scores
Source	Rating
About.com	4/5 stars
AllMusic	4/5 stars
Exclaim!	(unfavorable)

Road to Bloodshed is the first and only studio album by American thrash metal band Sanctity, released in the United States on April 24, 2007, through Roadrunner Records.

== Track listing ==
1. "Beneath the Machine" – 3:19
2. "Brotherhood of Destruction" – 4:21
3. "Road to Bloodshed" – 3:29
4. "Laws of Reason" – 4:26
5. "Billy Seals" – 3:28
6. "Zeppo" – 4:12
7. "Beloved Killer" – 3:19
8. "The Shape of Things" – 3:34
9. "Flatline" – 3:26
10. "The Rift Between" – 3:38
11. "Seconds" – 3:38
12. "Once Again" – 4:30
13. "Haze of Gray" – 3:46 (Japan only bonus track)

== Personnel ==
- Jared MacEachern – vocals, rhythm guitar
- Zeff Childress – lead guitar
- Derek Anderson – bass
- Jeremy London – drums
