= Unto the Locust =

Studio album by Machine Head
- Released: September 23, 2011
- Recorded: April–July 2011
- Studio: Jingletown, Oakland, California
- Genre: Thrash metal; groove metal
- Length: 48:58
- Label: Roadrunner
- Producer: Robb Flynn

Machine Head chronology
The Black Procession (2011)	Unto the Locust (2011)	Machine Fucking Head Live (2012)

Singles from Unto the Locust
- 1. "Locust" Released: June 14, 2011; 2. "Darkness Within" Released: July 31, 2012

Unto the Locust is the seventh studio album by American heavy metal band Machine Head, released in Australia on September 23, in the UK on September 26 and worldwide on September 27, 2011. It was produced and mixed by Robb Flynn, and was the band's highest charting album (22 on the Billboard 200) until their following release, Bloodstone & Diamonds, reached 21.

Unto the Locust was recorded in Green Day's Jingletown Studios. On June 14, 2011, Machine Head released a mix of lead single "Locust" on the 2011 Mayhem Festival iTunes sampler. This was their last studio album with cofounder and bassist Adam Duce before ongoing differences got him fired in February 2013. It is also their last studio album to be released through Roadrunner Records. It sold over 100,000 copies in the United States.

== Release ==
The first single from Unto the Locust, simply titled "Locust", was released on June 10, 2011. Side A begins with the song "Locust" and Side B contains the two live tracks "Beautiful Mourning" from The Blackening and "Bite the Bullet" from Through the Ashes of Empires.

Sloat stated about the "Locust" clip:

"The video is all based on the artwork from the album as well as the vision of the artist, Paul Gerrard. Together we hashed out some concepts for attack scenes as well as the band's performance. We shot the band on green screen in Philadelphia on August 1st, 2011. It was on a 'off' date from the [Rockstar Energy Drink] Mayhem Festival. There's well over 600 shots in the video, all of which have varying levels of CG effects, and ended up taking over two months to complete. [It is] easily the BIGGEST music video I've ever done. With so many CG shots, we had to divide the work among several CG FX people and editors. Once the shots came back, I would edit them in and start the color effects and any last minute tweaks I wanted to add."

== Special edition ==
The UK version of Metal Hammer magazine have announced that a special edition fan-pack would be released by the magazine with a 132-page special issue with exclusive behind-the-scenes access to the making of the album, extensive interviews with every member, historic shots from the band's personal collections, a guide to their custom rigs, and a diary of their massive Rockstar Energy Drink Mayhem Festival tour. Metal Hammer also gave away a special edition vinyl with their November 2011 issue containing the song Locust with alternate lyrics on the A-Side as well as live recordings of Beautiful Mourning and Bite the Bullet on the B-Side.

== Reception ==
Professional ratings
Aggregate scores
Source	Rating
Metacritic	91/100
Review scores
Source	Rating
About.com	4.5/5 stars
AllMusic	4/5 stars
Artistdirect	5/5 stars
Blabbermouth.net	9.0/10
Blistering	8/10
CraveOnline	8.5/10
Decibel	9/10 stars
The Guardian	5/5 stars
Metal Hammer	10/10
Pitchfork Media	7.7/10
Revolver	4.5/5

According to the review aggregator Metacritic, Unto the Locust received "universal acclaim" based on a weighted average score of 91 out of 100 from 6 critic scores.

The songs "I Am Hell" and "This Is The End" received heavy rotation on college radio stations, most notably on WVYC's After-Hour Abomination. Unto The Locust sold over 17,000 copies in the United States in its first week of release to land at position No. 22 on the Billboard 200 chart — putting Machine Head in the Top 25 for the first time in the band's 19-year history. This is also their third consecutive album to show at least a 20 percent increase in sales over its predecessor. This was accomplished in spite of the music market dropping by more than 45 percent in the four and a half years since the release of the band's previous album, The Blackening.

In 2011, the album won a Metal Storm Award for Best Thrash Metal Album.

=== Accolades ===
Year-end rankings

Publication	Accolade	Rank
Decibel	40 Best Metal of 2011	31
Loudwire	Top 10 Metal Albums of 2011	3
Metal Rules	The Top 20 Heavy Metal Albums of 2011	14
Pitchfork	Top 40 Metal Albums of 2011	36
Pop Matters	Best Metal of 2011	17

Decade-end rankings

Publication	Accolade	Rank
Kerrang!	The 75 Best Albums of the 2010s	60
Louder Sound	The 50 Best Metal Albums of the 2010s	28

== Tour ==
The band toured the album under the name of The Eighth Plague beginning November 1, 2011. Support came from the bands Bring Me the Horizon, DevilDriver and Darkest Hour. Robb Flynn made a statement saying that "This will no doubt be the heaviest show you're going to see this year. A lot of the greatest shows of our last touring cycle were in Europe and the U.K., so the prospect of this lineup combined with these crowds has us extremely stoked to get out there and tear it up! New material, great venues, killer fans... we absolutely cannot wait!"

The band also played two warm up shows, at Club Vegas in Salt Lake City, Utah and The Knitting Factory, Reno on July 5 and 7 respectively. These dates were first time the band had taken the stage since March 2010 after the touring cycle for their last album The Blackening ended. The band performed on the 2011 edition of Rockstar Mayhem Festival, marking their 2nd time on the tour, as they were on the inaugural tour in 2008. They spent the first 9 dates on the tour from July 9–20 playing the Main Stage, after which they headlined on the Revolver Stage spanning July 22 – August 14.

== Track listing ==
No.	Title	Lyrics	Music	Length
1.	"I Am Hell (Sonata in C#)": I: Sangre Sani (Blood Saint); II: I Am Hell; III: Ashes to the Sky"	Robb Flynn, Phil Demmel	Flynn	8:25
2.	"Be Still and Know"	Flynn, Demmel	Flynn, Demmel	5:43
3.	"Locust"	Flynn, Demmel	Flynn, Demmel	7:36
4.	"This Is the End"	Flynn	Flynn	6:11
5.	"Darkness Within"	Flynn	Flynn, Demmel, Dave McClain	6:28
6.	"Pearls Before the Swine"	Flynn, Demmel	Flynn, Demmel, McClain	7:19
7.	"Who We Are"	Flynn	Flynn	7:07

Deluxe collector's edition bonus tracks
No.	Title	Lyrics	Music	Length
8.	"The Sentinel" (Judas Priest cover)	Glenn Tipton, Rob Halford, K.K. Downing	Glenn Tipton, Rob Halford, K.K. Downing	5:08
9.	"Witch Hunt" (Rush cover)	Neil Peart	Geddy Lee, Alex Lifeson	4:46
10.	"Darkness Within" (Acoustic)	Flynn	Flynn, Demmel, McClain	5:05

Japanese bonus track
No.	Title	Lyrics	Music	Length
11.	"Halo" (Live)	Flynn	Flynn, McClain, Adam Duce, Demmel	9:09

Metal Hammer special fan pack bonus track
No.	Title	Lyrics	Music	Length
8.	"Locust" (Live)	Flynn, Demmel	Flynn, Demmel	7:42

Bonus DVD
No.	Title	Length
1.	"Making of 'Unto the Locust'"	22:43

== Personnel ==
Machine Head

- Robb Flynn – lead and harmony vocals, rhythm guitar, acoustic guitar
- Adam Duce – bass, backing vocals
- Phil Demmel – lead guitar, backing vocals
- Dave McClain – drums

Additional musicians

- Rachel, Kathy, Genie, and Michi of Quartet Rouge – Strings on "I Am Hell", "Darkness Within", and "Who We Are"

Production

- Robb Flynn – production, mixing
- Juan Urteaga – mixing, engineering
- Brad Kobylczak – assistant engineering
- Lee Bothwick – assistant engineering
- Ted Jensen – mastering
- Paul Gerrard – artwork
- Myriam Santos – photography
- Strephon Taylor – logo design

== Chart positions ==
Chart (2011)	Peak position
Australian Albums Chart	10
Austrian Albums Chart	6
Belgian Albums Chart (Flanders)	19
Belgian Albums Chart (Wallonia)	21
Canadian Albums Chart	32
Danish Albums Chart	10
Dutch Albums Chart	20
Finnish Albums Chart	8
French Albums Chart	18
German Albums Chart	5
Hungarian Albums Chart	19
Japanese Albums Chart	18
New Zealand Albums Chart	19
Norwegian Albums Chart	15
Spanish Albums Chart	28
Swedish Albums Chart	14
Swiss Albums Chart	10
UK Albums Chart	43
U.S. Billboard 200	22
