= Of Kingdom and Crown =

Studio album by Machine Head
- Released: August 26, 2022
- Recorded: December 2019 – January 2022
- Studios: Sharkbite Studios, Oakland, California; The Locust Room, Oakland, California
- Genres: Groove metal; thrash metal; alternative metal
- Length: 59:22 (standard); 70:00 (digipak)
- Labels: Nuclear Blast; Imperium
- Producers: Robb Flynn; Zack Ohren

Machine Head chronology
Catharsis (2018)	Of Kingdom and Crown (2022)	Unatoned (2025)

Singles from Of Kingdom and Crown
- 1. "My Hands Are Empty" Released: November 13, 2020; 2. "Become The Firestorm" Released: June 11, 2021; 3. "Choke on the Ashes of Your Hate" Released: April 12, 2022; 4. "Unhallowed" Released: June 21, 2022; 5. "No Gods, No Masters" Released: August 26, 2022

Of Kingdom and Crown (stylized as ØF KINGDØM AND CRØWN) is the tenth studio album by American heavy metal band Machine Head, released on August 26, 2022, through Nuclear Blast and Imperium Recordings. It is the band's only album to feature guitarist Wacław Kiełtyka who joined the band in late 2019, and left in early 2024. and the first album to feature drummer Matt Alston. (Note: While Alston is credited as being the drummer of the band, the liner notes credit Koperweis with "Drums performed by Navene Koperweis".) The band's first concept album, Of Kingdom and Crown is set in a futuristic wasteland and revolves around two characters, Ares and Eros, who both go on their own respective killing sprees following the death of their loved ones.

Of Kingdom and Crown was positively received by critics, many who called it a return to form for Machine Head following the release of the band's oft-maligned ninth album Catharsis (2018), with praise being directed towards the album's diversity and musicianship, which was described as heavier and more technical than previous efforts.

== Concept and lyrics ==
Of Kingdom and Crown is the band's first concept album. The band's frontman, Robb Flynn, described the general plot of the album's concept to Blabbermouth;

"The concept is set in a futuristic wasteland where the sky is always crimson red, and it's based around two characters. Character number one is named Ares [pronounced Aries], and he loses the love of his life, Amethyst, and goes on a murderous rampage against the people who killed her. Character number two is Eros [pronounced Arrows], who loses his mother to a drug overdose and, in his downward spiral, depression, becomes radicalized by this charismatic leader and goes on his own killing spree and is one of the people who killed Amethyst. And so the lyrics detail how their lives intertwine."

The initial concept of Of Kingdom and Crown was described by Robb Flynn as "a very American story arc" where there was a good guy who won. While Flynn thought the concept was "good", he was unhappy with it when he found he was unable to connect to it emotionally. After watching the anime series Attack on Titan, which Flynn's two sons had got him and his family into during the COVID-19 pandemic, Flynn had a "total lightbulb going off", and rewrote the concept to make both of the protagonists antiheroes. Flynn wrote most of the album's lyrics "in his head", and at 3 a.m. "I just would set a timer for 20 minutes and I would just write anything that came to my mind — dumb shit, killer shit. I would just try and make everything rhyme; I would try and make a sequence out of it. And then I would just go back to bed and then wake up and look at it the next morning and then I would either sing it or try and mess around with it. And I think just doing it, kind of just chipping away at it like that every day, really helped the story come together." While most of the album's lyrics were written solely by Flynn, Jared McEachern and Wacław Kiełtyka also helped contribute to the lyrics and music, with McEachern and Flynn "bouncing" ideas off each other. Due to logistical problems caused by the COVID-19 pandemic, Matt Alston was unable to perform drum duties for the album, but recorded the album's demo tracks

=== Plot summary ===
The album's story is set in a "decimated futuristic wasteland where the sky is stained crimson red". A man called Ares becomes overcome by rage and need for revenge when his love Amethyst is murdered ("Slaughter the Martyr"), and in his rage, combined with the dystopia he sees ("Choke On The Ashes Of Your Hate"), becomes the leader of an army rampaging through society ("Become The Firestorm").

In a flashback, another man, Eros, loses his mother to a drug overdose ("Overdose"), which pushes him into a depression ("My Hands are Empty"); as he struggles to stay sane ("Unhallowed"), he is radicalized by a demagogue ("Assimilate"), and goes on a murderous rampage ("Kill Thy Enemies"), culminating in the murder of Amethyst retold at the start of the story.

As Ares' army continues their destruction ("No Gods, No Masters"), Eros prepares to face them head on ("Bloodshot"), but realizing what he has done, breaks from his conviction ("Rotten") and commits suicide ("Terminus"). Understanding the futility of the war he is waging, Ares vows to end it ("Arrows In Words From The Sky").

== Reception ==
Professional ratings
Review scores
Source	Rating
Angry Metal Guy	2.5/5
Blabbermouth	10/10
Classic Rock	3.5/5 stars
Distorted Sound	8/10
Kerrang!	4/5 stars
Metal Hammer	4/5 stars
Metal Injection	9/10
Record Collector	3/5 stars
Sputnikmusic	2.9/5

Of Kingdom and Crown received critical acclaim from music critics.

Many publications hailed the album as a return to form for the band. Writing for Kerrang!, Dan Slessor praised the band's musical interplay and wrote "Machine Head have been down before – their nu-metal adventures 20-something years ago – and have come back from it, so maybe counting them out was premature. Regardless, with this version of the band they are back to their best, and that is all that matters." Simultaneously, it was also praised as for its diversity and advancement of the band's sound, which was described as heavier and more technical; Blabbermouth, who awarded the album a perfect 10/10 score, described Of Kingdom and Crown as "the greatest record Machine Head have ever made", writing; "the principle and performance remain the same — tight, brutal, precise — throughout what is easily this band's most vicious and punishing album yet."

Metal Injection gave the album a 9/10, writing "Despite its occasional stumble – it's another long album, with more than a little recognizable fat to be trimmed in tracks like 'No Gods, No Masters' – it's undoubtedly a career high point for the band and one that could be held up against The Blackening in comparison with very little complaint. The storytelling aspect works, and the music is top-notch and as heavy as Machine Head comes in places. What's not to love?"

== Track listing ==
All tracks are written by Robb Flynn, except where noted.

No.	Title	Lyrics	Music	Length
1.	"Slaughter the Martyr"		Flynn; Jared MacEachern	10:25
2.	"Choke on the Ashes of Your Hate"	Flynn; MacEachern	Flynn; MacEachern	4:06
3.	"Become the Firestorm"			4:59
4.	"Overdose"			0:58
5.	"My Hands Are Empty"	Flynn; MacEachern	Flynn; MacEachern; Logan Mader	5:29
6.	"Unhallowed"	Flynn; MacEachern	Flynn; MacEachern; Wacław Kiełtyka	6:29
7.	"Assimilate"			0:59
8.	"Kill Thy Enemies"		Flynn; MacEachern	5:40
9.	"No Gods, No Masters"	Flynn; MacEachern	Flynn; MacEachern	4:18
10.	"Bloodshot"	Flynn; MacEachern	Flynn; MacEachern; Kiełtyka	4:20
11.	"Rotten"			4:32
12.	"Terminus"			1:12
13.	"Arrows in Words from the Sky"	Flynn; MacEachern		5:55
Total length:				59:22

Digipak and box set bonus tracks
No.	Title	Lyrics	Length
14.	"Exteroception" (instrumental)		4:45
15.	"Arrows in Words from the Sky" (acoustic)	Flynn; MacEachern	5:53
Total length:			70:00

Notes

- All tracks are stylized in all caps, and all letter O's are stylised as "Ø"

== Personnel ==
Machine Head

- Robb Flynn – lead vocals, guitar
- Wacław Kiełtyka – guitar
- Jared MacEachern – bass, backing vocals
- Matt Alston – drums, percussion

Production and additional musicians

- Robb Flynn – production
- Zack Ohren – production, engineering
- Colin Richardson – mixing
- Chris Clancy – mixing, engineering
- Ted Jensen – producer, engineering
- Logan Mader – guitar and songwriting on "My Hands Are Empty"
- Seth Siro Anton – artwork
- Navene Koperweis – drum performance

== Charts ==
Chart performance for Of Kingdom and Crown
Chart (2022)	Peak position
Australian Albums (ARIA)	27
Austrian Albums (Ö3 Austria)	6
Belgian Albums (Ultratop Flanders)	34
Belgian Albums (Ultratop Wallonia)	16
Dutch Albums (Album Top 100)	62
Finnish Albums (Suomen virallinen lista)	13
German Albums (Offizielle Top 100)	6
Japanese Albums (Oricon)	64
Japanese Hot Albums (Billboard Japan)	61
Polish Albums (ZPAV)	11
Scottish Albums (Official Charts)	7
Spanish Albums (Promusicae)	28
Swiss Albums (Schweizer Hitparade)	3
UK Albums (Official Charts)	27
UK Independent Albums (Official Charts)	3
UK Rock & Metal Albums (Official Charts)	1

== Release history ==
Release history and formats for Of Kingdom and Crown
Country	Format	Date	Ref.
Various	CD; digital download; streaming	August 26, 2022	
Various	Vinyl	November 25, 2022	
