= Torque (band) =

American groove metal band

Background information
- Origin: San Francisco Bay Area, California, U.S.
- Genres: Groove metal, thrash metal
- Years active: 1994–1997
- Label: Mascot Records
- Spinoff of: Vio-lence
- Past members: Phil Demmel; Ray Vegas; Deen Dell; Mark Hernandez

Torque was an American groove/thrash metal band from the San Francisco Bay Area, active from 1994 to 1997.

== History ==
Torque consisted of Phil Demmel (Machine Head, Vio-lence) on lead guitar and vocals, Ray Vegas on rhythm guitar, Deen Dell on bass, and Mark Hernandez on drums.

The band released three demos between 1994 and 1997. A self-titled debut album, released on Mascot Records in 1996, is their sole studio release.

The songs "Breed", "Again", and "Shooter", from the original release, were written while the band was still recording as Vio-lence, with lyrics by Sean Killian before he left the band in 1993. After forming Torque, Demmel re-recorded the vocals. Mascot signed the band, who went to 'O' Street Studios in Antioch, California to record the full album with Rob Beaton.

Their self-titled album was reissued with bonus tracks via Mascot Records in 2019.

== Members ==
- Phil Demmel – lead vocals, lead guitar (1994–1997)
- Ray Vegas – rhythm guitar, backing vocals (1994–1997)
- Deen Dell – bass, backing vocals (1994–1997)
- Mark Hernandez – drums, backing vocals (1994–1997)

== Discography ==
Demo albums

- Demo 1994
- Demo 1995
- Demo 1997

Studio albums

- 1996: Torque (Mascot Records)
