= Dublin Death Patrol =

American thrash metal band

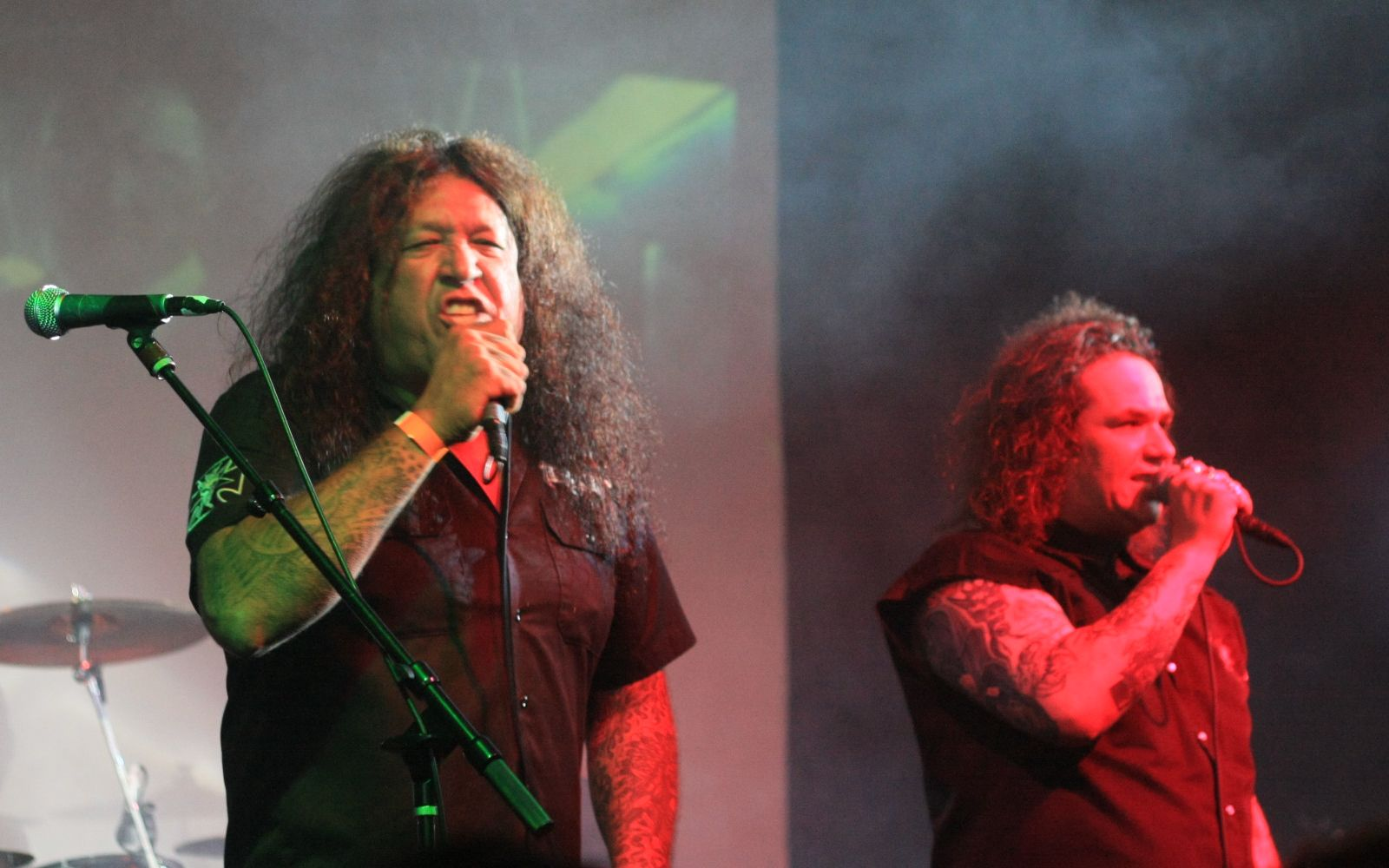
- Chuck Billy and Steve Souza on stage, 2011

Background information
- Origin: Dublin, California, U.S.
- Genre: Thrash metal
- Years active: 2006–present
- Label: Mascot
- Members: Chuck Billy; Steve Souza; Andy Billy; Greg Bustamante; Steve Robello; Willy Langenhuizen; John Souza; John Hartsinck; Eddie Billy; Danny Cunningham; Troy Luccketta
- Past members: Phil Demmel
- Website: dublindeathpatrol.com

Dublin Death Patrol (DDP) is an American thrash metal band formed in 2006 by Testament singer Chuck Billy and Exodus singer Steve Souza.

The band began as a seven-piece with Souza and Billy on vocals, Billy's brother Andy, Greg Bustamante and Steve Robello on guitar, Willy Lange on bass, and Dan Cunningham on drums. During the recording process of the album in 2007, the band added three more members to the fold: Troy Luccketta on drums/percussion, Steve Souza's brother John Souza on bass, and Phil Demmel on guitar. They made one more change after the album, adding their 11th member, Eddie Billy, on bass – the third of the Billy brothers in the band.

For local shows after the album's release the lineup was an eight-piece featuring Chuck Billy and Steve Souza on vocals, Willy Lange on bass, Andy Billy, Steve Robello, Greg Bustamante and John Hartsinck on guitar, and Danny Cunningham on drums.

For the touring of the album, not all of the members could make it across the country and overseas, so the lineup for the tour was trimmed down to Chuck Billy and Steve Souza, John Souza on bass, Dan Cunningham on drums, and Andy Billy, Greg Bustamante and special guest John Hartsinck on guitar. Eventually, the hometown "official" lineup was re-established and John Hartsinck took Phil Demmel's place (although it looks like he took Steve Robello's place, and Steve Robello was placed back in Demmel's spot).

Dublin Death Patrol has released two albums on the Mascot Records label, 2005's DDP 4 Life and 2012's follow-up effort Death Sentence on August 14.

== Members ==
- Chuck Billy – vocals
- Steve "Zetro" Souza – vocals
- Andy Billy – guitar
- Greg Bustamante – guitar
- John Hartsinck – guitar
- Steve Robello – guitar
- Willy Lange – bass
- Eddie Billy – bass
- John Souza – bass
- Danny Cunningham – drums
- Troy Luccketta – drums

Performances' lineups usually include a minimum of seven musicians, depending on which band members are available at the time.

=== Former members ===
- Phil Demmel – guitar

== Discography ==
- DDP 4 Life (2007)
- Death Sentence (2012)
