= Sanctity (band) =

American thrash metal band

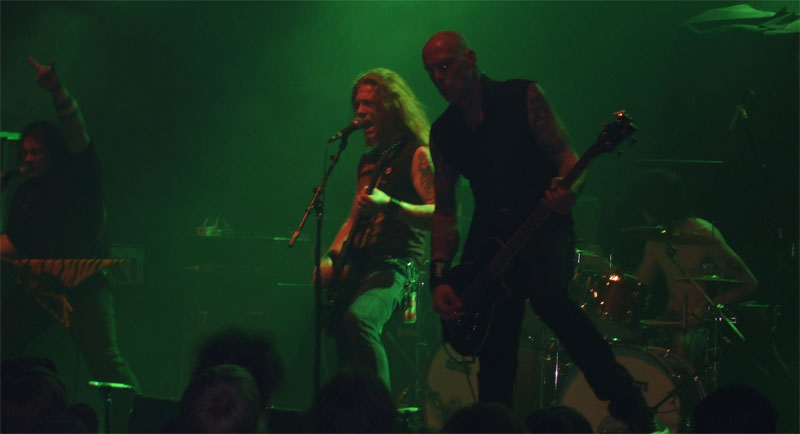
- Sanctity in 2007

Background information
- Origin: Asheville, North Carolina, U.S.
- Genres: Thrash metal, heavy metal
- Years active: 1998–2008
- Label: Roadrunner
- Past members: Zeff Childress; Scott Smith; Jeremy London; Nate Queen; Jared MacEachern; Bill Moody; Joey Cox; Danny Lanier; Derek Anderson; Zach Jordan
- Website: sanctityweb.com

Sanctity was an American thrash metal band from Asheville, North Carolina. They formed in 1998 and released Road to Bloodshed in 2007. They were in the midst of writing material for another album, with an undisclosed new vocalist, which did not have a chance to come to fruition before the band's dissolution in 2008. Founder, songwriter and lead guitarist Zeff now has a separate project named Graveyard Fields and Jeremy, Jared and Derek also have a project together.

== History ==
After touring extensively around the North Carolina, Tennessee and South Carolina areas, Sanctity got their break after Trivium saw the band perform live at a gig in South Carolina. Matt Heafy, impressed with what he saw, received the band's recorded material, and passed it on to Roadrunner's A&R person Monte Conner.

In late 2005 the band self-financed and produced a music video for their song "Zeppo" with director Ramon Boutviseth. They were signed to Roadrunner and toured the US as a supporting act for DragonForce in the first half of 2006. Megadeth's Dave Mustaine caught Sanctity's set at one of these shows and personally invited the band to join his summer metalfest Gigantour. Later that year, Sanctity supported labelmates Trivium on their first headlining tour of the US, and Children of Bodom on their US tour at the end of the year. The band released its debut album Road to Bloodshed in April 2007, following the production and subsequent release of the music video for "Beneath the Machine", also directed by Boutviseth. They supported Trivium on their European tour along with Gojira and Annihilator, and opened for Zakk Wylde's band Black Label Society on the first leg of their spring US tour. Following the completion of a summer US tour with progressive metallers Symphony X, Sanctity set out on another US run in support of Machine Head alongside Arch Enemy and Throwdown. The music video for "Beloved Killer" was released shortly thereafter. In October 2007, the band embarked on their first headlining run, touring the UK with Evile and Romeo Must Die.

== Members ==
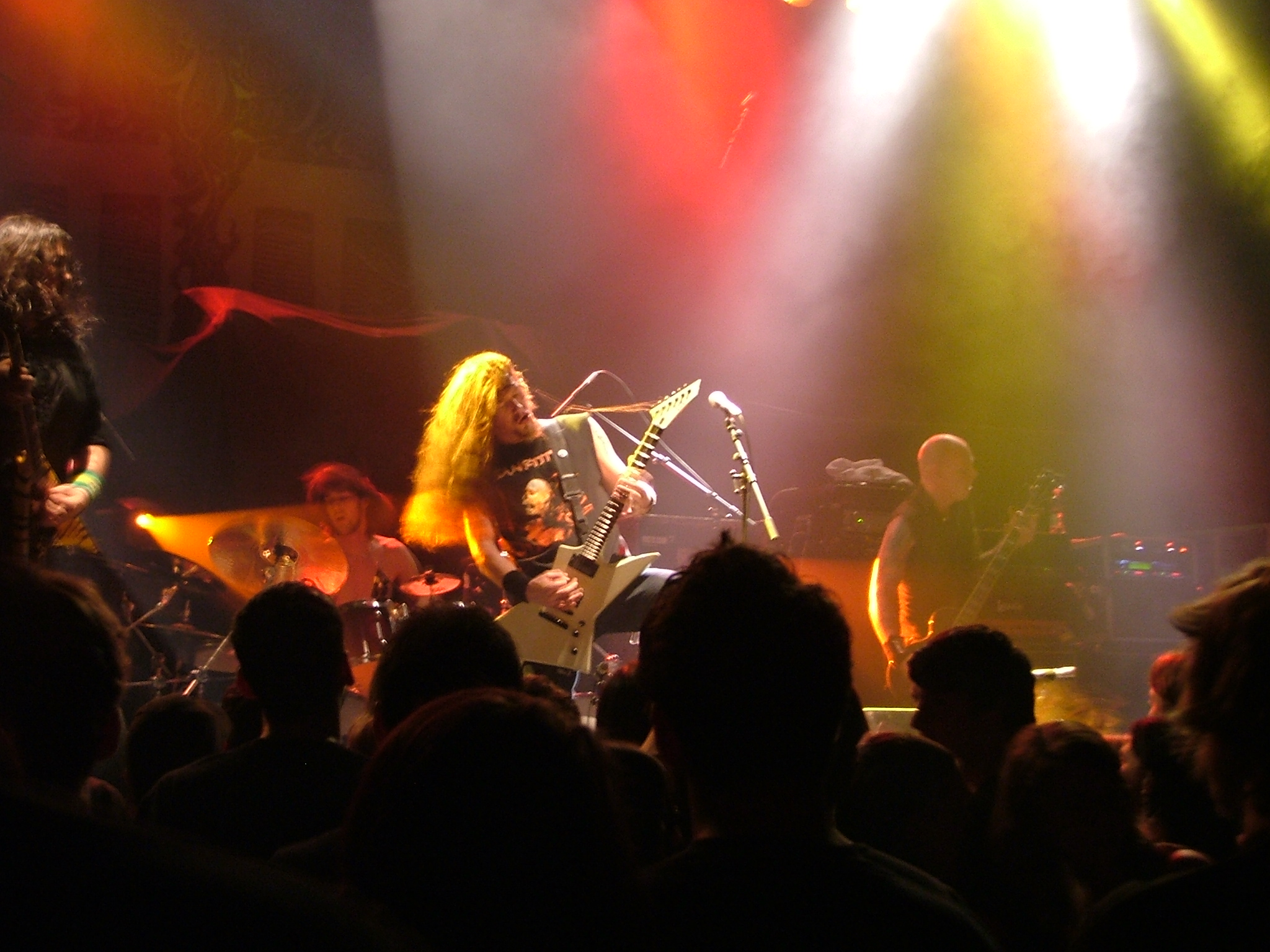
Sanctity performing in 2007

- Zach Jordan – rhythm guitar
- Zeff Childress – lead guitar
- Scott Smith – bass
- Jeremy London – drums

=== Former ===
- Nate Queen – vocals
- Brian Stephenson – vocals (touring)
- Jared MacEachern – vocals, rhythm guitar (played on debut album)
- Derek Anderson – bass (played on debut album)
- Billy Moody – bass (left during the making of debut album)
- Joey Cox – vocals
- Danny Lanier – bass

== Discography ==
Since their adoption to Roadrunner Records, Sanctity have released one studio album.

- Road to Bloodshed (2007)

=== Demos ===
- Untitled (2003)
1. "Harvest" – 4:18
2. "Images" – 4:36
3. "Two Days from Yesterday" – 4:12
- Untitled (2005)
1. "Driftwood"
2. "Lost to Ego"
3. "Seconds"
4. "Brotherhood"

=== EPs ===
- Bedroom Sessions (2004)
1. "Shallow Lies" – 3:43
2. "Flatline" – 4:27
3. "Two Days" – 4:08
4. "Lament" – 1:54
5. "Zeppo" – 5:35

=== Music videos ===
Date	Title	Director	Album
2005	"Zeppo"	Ramon Boutviseth	Road to Bloodshed
2007	"Beneath the Machine"	Ramon Boutviseth	Road to Bloodshed
2007	"Beloved Killer"	Ramon Boutviseth	Road to Bloodshed

== Awards ==
Date	Title	Contributor
Fall 2007	Best New Band	Total Guitar Magazine, issue 170
Fall 2007	# 9 – Best International Newcomer	Rock Sound Magazine
Spring 2008	# 2 – Best New Band	Metal Hammer Magazine
