= Jared MacEachern =

American musician (born 1980)

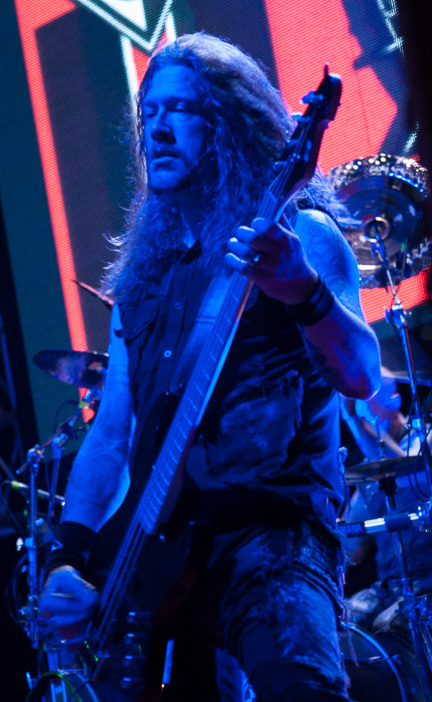
- MacEachern with Machine Head in 2015

Background information
- Born: August 16, 1980 (age 46); Virginia Beach, Virginia, U.S.
- Genres: Thrash metal; groove metal
- Occupation: Musician
- Instruments: Bass; vocals; guitar
- Years active: 1998–present
- Member of: Machine Head
- Formerly of: Sanctity; Serenity Dies

Jared MacEachern (born August 16, 1980) is an American heavy metal musician who is the current bassist of Machine Head. He was previously the singer and rhythm guitarist of Sanctity.

== Biography ==
MacEachern started singing in his parents' church choir when he was five until he was thirteen. He started playing musical instruments when he was ten, starting with the violin, later switching to cello, and then to bass guitar, which he played for several years. He graduated from Frank W. Cox High School in Virginia Beach. He went to college for music performance for bass. He then met his future Sanctity bandmates and switched to guitar.

MacEachern became exposed to heavy metal music around the age of twelve. A friend had a copy of Metallica's Black Album and he played the song "The Unforgiven". Afterwards, another friend gave MacEachern an old copy of Kill 'Em All. MacEachern was captivated, as he did not previously know music in that style existed. He considers his two favorite heavy metal albums to be Kill 'Em All and Arise by Sepultura. He became completely enamored with the metal bands of that time, such as Metallica, Megadeth, Slayer and Pantera, but for his bass playing, his main influence was former Metallica bassist Cliff Burton.

=== Sanctity ===
With a brief stint at the Brevard School for Music Performance, MacEachern has consistently played bass for over two decades. However, in Sanctity he played rhythm guitar and provided lead vocals. The band formed in 1998 and released one album, Road to Bloodshed, on April 24, 2007.

In February 2008, MacEachern left Sanctity for personal reasons. His child had recently been born and MacEachern wanted to focus on being a good father.

=== Serenity Dies ===
In October 2010, Serenity Dies, a thrash metal band from the Maldives formed in 2005, announced that it had begun writing new material with MacEachern, who stated: — "I'm really excited to join Serenity Dies. This band is exactly what I was looking for and I'm stoked that they asked me to be a part of it! We've already got our collective creative juices flowing, and new songs are in the works. We're all really looking forward to breaking some heads!"

=== Machine Head ===
In June 2013, Machine Head announced that MacEachern had joined as an official member, replacing their former bassist and founding member, Adam Duce. The band released their first album with him in November 2014 entitled Bloodstone & Diamonds.

== Discography ==
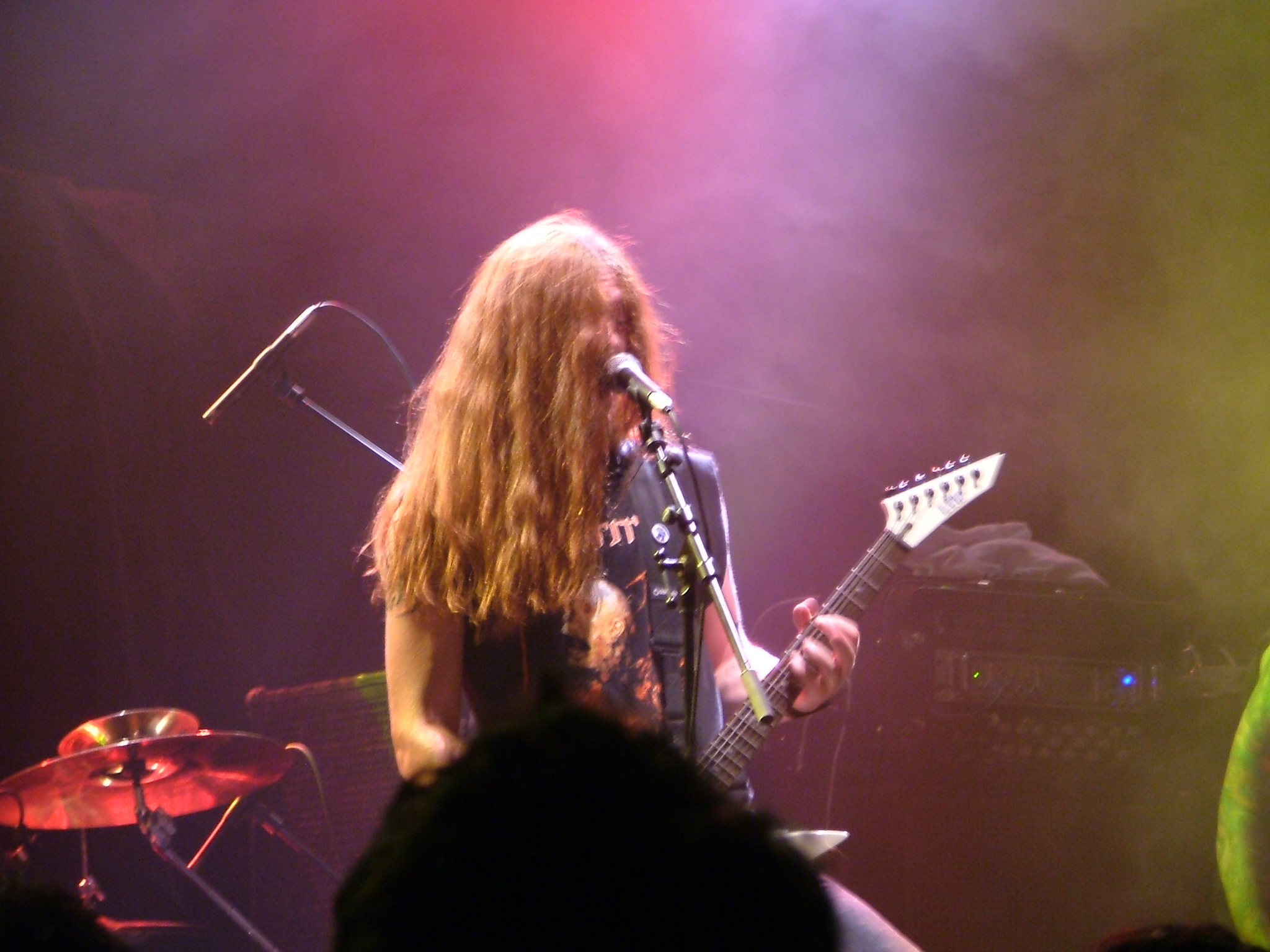
MacEachern with Sanctity in 2007

With Sanctity

- "Beneath the Machine" (single) (2007)
- Road to Bloodshed (2007)

With Machine Head

- Bloodstone & Diamonds (2014)
- Catharsis (2018)
- Of Kingdom and Crown (2022)
- Unatoned (2025)
