= Oppressing the Masses =

Studio album by Vio-lence
- Released: July 13, 1990
- Recorded: December 1989
- Genre: Thrash metal
- Length: 41:28
- Label: Megaforce/Atlantic
- Producer: Alex Perialas

Vio-lence chronology
Eternal Nightmare (1988)	Oppressing the Masses (1990)	Torture Tactics (1991)

Professional ratings
Review scores
Source	Rating
AllMusic	3/5 stars

Oppressing the Masses is the second album by San Francisco Bay Area thrash metal band Vio-lence. It was originally released in July 13, 1990 via Megaforce Records. The original print (20,000) contained the song "Torture Tactics" but all copies were destroyed because of Atlantic Records' objection to the lyrical content. However, that song can be found on the Japanese version of the album. The re-release version contains the tracks from Torture Tactics EP. As of 2023, this is one of the two Vio-lence studio albums (along with Nothing to Gain) to have never been made available on digital services worldwide.

== Track listing ==
All lyrics are written by Killian.

Side one
No.	Title	Music	Length
1.	"I Profit"	Flynn, Demmel	7:04
2.	"Officer Nice"	Demmel, Flynn	5:23
3.	"Subterfuge"	Flynn, Demmel	4:38
4.	"Engulfed by Flames"	Demmel, Flynn, Killian	3:55

Side two
No.	Title	Music	Length
1.	"World in a World"	Flynn, Demmel	4:11
2.	"Mentally Afflicted"	Flynn, Demmel, Killian	5:49
3.	"Liquid Courage"	Demmel, Flynn, Killian	5:27
4.	"Oppressing the Masses"	Demmel, Flynn	4:58

Japan bonus track

No.	Title	Music	Length
5.	"Torture Tactics"	Demmel, Flynn, Killian	5:18

== Credits ==
- Sean Killian – lead vocals
- Phil Demmel – guitars
- Robb Flynn – guitars
- Dean Dell – bass
- Perry Strickland – drums
