= Mordred (band) =

American funk/thrash metal band

Mordred is an American funk metal/thrash metal band based in the San Francisco Bay Area. They released three studio albums and one EP from 1989 to 1994. The album Fool's Game (1989) followed the Bay Area thrash blueprint, while The Next Room resembled a Faith No More album.

In a 2016 interview on music website No Echo, bassist Art Liboon spoke about the lack of success after The Next Room was released,

At this time, [Mordred drummer] Gannon [Hall] took over as manager. We seemed to be moving along okay during the recording. The noise appeared to be giving it a supportive reaction. When it hit the shelves, our strongest fanbase in Germany either shunned the record or didn't know about our forthcoming tour. There were no pre-sale tickets for the tour. Noise pulled the plug on the tour. We said, 'Fuck you,' by disbanding. We were not bluffing. The tour cancellation and growing tension between Gannon and Karl from Noise led to the ultimate sacrifice: ending the band.

Mordred broke up in 1995 and reunited in 2001. The following year, they played live in San Francisco and went on to perform again. The band did not release new material until 2015. On October 20, 2013, Mordred created their official Facebook page. A few days later, they announced a reunion with the "In This Life" lineup.

The band toured the UK and Ireland in 2014 with drummer Jeff Gomes, alongside British Metal Revival band Kaine. They played the then-new song "The Baroness", and announced their intention to record a new album.

Mordred's first full-length studio album in 27 years, The Dark Parade, was released on July 23, 2021.

== Members ==
=== Current members ===
- Art Liboon – bass, backing vocals (1984–1995, 2001, 2007, 2013–present)
- James Sanguinetti – guitars, backing vocals (1984–1986, 1990–1995, 2001, 2007, 2013–present)
- Aaron Vaughn – keyboards, turntables, backing vocals (1989–1995, 2001, 2007, 2013–present)
- Scott Holderby – lead vocals (1986–1993, 2001, 2013–present)
- Danny White – guitars (1986–1995, 2013–present)
- Jeff Gomes – drums (2014–present)

=== Former members ===
- Paul Kimball – lead vocals (1993–1994)
- Jim Taffer – guitars (1987–1989)
- Steve Scates – lead vocals (1984–1986, 2007)
- Eric Lannon – drums (1984–1987, 2001–2007)
- Alex Gerould – guitars (1984–1987)
- Slade Anderson – drums (1984–1985)
- Shawn Tearle – guitars (1986–1988)
- Sven Soderlund – guitars (1984–1985, 2007)
- Chris Powell – guitars (2001)
- Gannon Hall – drums (1987–1995, 2001, 2013–2014)
- Josh Juska - guitars (1984)

=== Touring members ===
- Jeff Gomes – drums (2013–2014)

== Discography ==
=== Studio albums ===
- Fool's Game (1989)
- In This Life (1991)
- The Next Room (1994)
- The Dark Parade (2021)

=== EPs ===
- Falling Away (1991)
- Esse Quam Videri (1991)
- Vision (1992)
- Grand Summit (1994)
- Splinter Down (1994)
- Netherworld (2015) (digital release)
- Volition (2020)

=== Compilation albums ===
- Demo I (1986)
- Demo II (1987)
- The Demos 1986–1988 (2014)

=== Home videos ===
- In This Live Video (1992)
