= Metal Allegiance =

American heavy metal band

- Origin: New York, U.S.
- Genres: Thrash metal, groove metal
- Years active: 2014–present
- Label: Nuclear Blast
- Spinoffs: BPMD, Category 7
- Spinoff of: Testament, Megadeth, Dream Theater, The Winery Dogs, Flying Colors
- Members: Mark Menghi; David Ellefson; Alex Skolnick; Mike Portnoy
- Website: metalallegiance.com

Metal Allegiance is an American thrash metal supergroup formed on Long Island, New York, in 2014 by bassist and songwriter Mark Menghi. Shortly after, he recruited bassist David Ellefson (formerly of Megadeth), guitarist Alex Skolnick (from Testament), and drummer Mike Portnoy (from Dream Theater). The group does not have an official lead singer; they hire guest musicians to sing and/or play guitar in the studio and on live shows, including Andreas Kisser of Sepultura and Mark Osegueda of Death Angel. Metal Allegiance has released two studio albums and one EP.

== Background ==
Metal Allegiance was formed by bassist/songwriter/producer Mark Menghi on Long Island in July 2014. Menghi recruited then-Megadeth bassist David Ellefson and drummer Mike Portnoy (Dream Theater, The Winery Dogs, Sons of Apollo and Flying Colors) to perform on Motörhead's Motörboat Cruise for their first live appearance as Metal Allegiance, which was described as "a celebration of heavy metal, powered by the almost tribal bond shared between the extreme music community's most revered trailblazers, armed with a list of contributors onstage (and off) that read like a Wikipedia entry on the genre itself." All the band members were friends and had jammed together on occasion, including events such as the Shiprocked Cruise and NAMM. This led to recording an album. On the Motörboat Cruise, they enlisted guitarist Alex Skolnick (Testament) as the final member of the four-piece. Their eponymous album was released on September 17, 2015, and included guest vocals by Phil Anselmo, Randy Blythe, Troy Sanders, Chuck Billy, Mark Osegueda, Cristina Scabbia, Matt Heafy, Doug Pinnick, Jamey Jasta, Chris Jericho, Tim "Ripper" Owens, Alissa White-Gluz and Steve "Zetro" Souza, guitar by Heafy, Gary Holt, Phil Demmel, Andreas Kisser, Misha Mansoor, Ben Weinman, Charlie Benante and Ron "Bumblefoot" Thal, and bass by Rex Brown. Between December 2014 and September 2015, Menghi, Ellefson, Skolnick and Portnoy wrote, recorded, mixed and mastered their debut album with over two dozen guests, and signed with Nuclear Blast Entertainment. Metal Allegiance received positive reviews worldwide, and performed well on the charts, entering number 143 on the Billboard 200, and number 27 on the Top Rock Albums chart. The band promoted the album by touring at various venues in the United States and performing at many festivals, as well as appearances at Loud Park Festival in Japan and Bloodstock Festival in the United Kingdom, amongst others.

Metal Allegiance's next release was the digital-only covers EP Fallen Heroes, released on August 12, 2016, as a tribute to Lemmy, David Bowie and Glenn Frey. The EP includes covers of Motörhead's "Iron Fist", Bowie's "Suffragette City" and the Eagles' "Life in the Fast Lane", with vocals by Troy Sanders, Mark Osegueda and Alissa White-Gluz, respectively. Metal Allegiance performed a special "Fallen Heroes" tribute concert at The Grove in Anaheim, California on January 20, 2017, where they covered music from their personal musical heroes who had died.

Metal Allegiance released their second album, Volume II: Power Drunk Majesty, on September 7, 2018. In addition to Osegueda and Sanders, guest vocalists on the album included Trevor Strnad, John Bush, Bobby "Blitz" Ellsworth, Mark Tornillo, Johan Hegg, Max Cavalera and Floor Jansen.

By 2019, Metal Allegiance was working on their third album, which was reportedly going to include guest appearances by Bobby "Blitz" Ellsworth and Phil Demmel.

== Members ==
Current line-up

- Mark Menghi – bass, songwriter (2014–present)
- Alex Skolnick – guitars (2014–present)
- David Ellefson – bass (2014–present)
- Mike Portnoy – drums (2014–present)

Live musicians

- Andreas Kisser – guitars (2014–present)
- Mark Osegueda – vocals (2015–present)
- Charlie Benante – drums (2015–2016)
- Dave Lombardo – drums (2016, 2020)
- Phil Demmel – guitars (2016, 2022–present)
- Chuck Billy – vocals (2022–present)
- John Bush – vocals (2022–present)
- Jack Gibson – bass (2022–present)
- Doc Coyle – guitars (2024–present)
- Alissa White-Gluz - vocals (2026-)
- Becky Baldwin - Bass (2026-)

== Discography ==
=== Studio albums ===
- Metal Allegiance (2015)
- Volume II: Power Drunk Majesty (2018)

=== EPs ===
- Fallen Heroes (2016)
