= Phil Demmel =

American guitarist (born 1967)

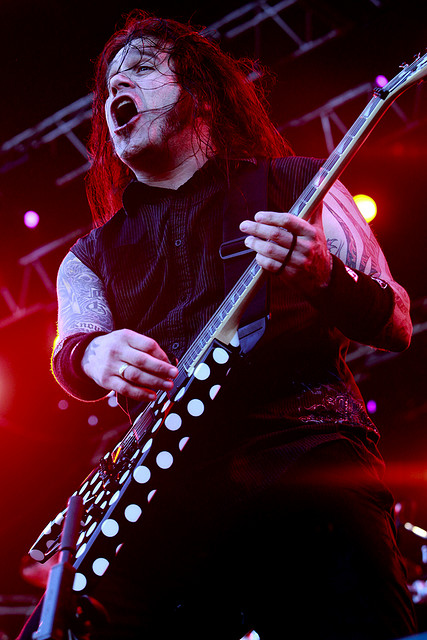
- Demmel performing in 2009

Background information
- Born: April 2, 1967 (age 58); Dublin, California, U.S.
- Genres: Thrash metal; groove metal; heavy metal
- Occupation: Musician
- Instrument: Guitar
- Years active: 1985–present
- Member of: BPMD; Kerry King; Category 7
- Formerly of: Machine Head; Vio-lence; Torque; Technocracy

Phil Demmel (born April 2, 1967) is an American musician who played lead guitar in the heavy metal band Machine Head between 2002 and 2018, making him their longest running member in that position. He has also performed with other artists such as Vio-lence, Torque, Metal Allegiance, BPMD, Kerry King and Category 7, and briefly with Slayer, Nonpoint, Overkill, Lamb of God and Testament as a fill-in guitarist.

== Biography ==
In 1996, Demmel auditioned for lead vocals with Sepultura as the replacement for Max Cavalera, but lost that position to Derrick Green.

Demmel joined Machine Head shortly before the recording of the 2003 album Through the Ashes of Empires. He began touring with Machine Head in 2002. He was long time friends with Machine Head frontman Robb Flynn, either since or before they both played in Vio-lence.

In 2007 Demmel appeared as a guest on the album DDP 4 Life with Chuck Billy's and Steve Souza's Dublin Death Patrol.

Demmel has suffered from a loss of consciousness and fainting several times while playing live with Machine Head. At first believed to be a side effect of dehydration, Demmel has since said that an existing heart condition was the cause. On the subject of his collapse whilst playing in Bristow, Virginia, he said,

"I've suffered from episodes of Cardiogenic Syncope for the last 17 years or so but (doctors) ran a series of tests that came up inconclusive. I hadn't had it happen for a while until last December in Italy, when I passed out roughly about the time my father passed away back in the States. The incident in Virginia felt similar to what has happened in the past"

Demmel announced his engagement to Bleeding Through's keyboardist Marta Peterson in January 2012. Before that, he had two children. The two were married later that year.

Following Demmel's departure from Machine Head in November 2018, musical outlets reported there were rumors that he would reunite with Vio-lence, who planned to do shows and possibly release new material "in the not too distant future". A reunion of the band was officially confirmed on January 8, 2019, and it has been performing occasional live shows since then. The band released their first recording in 29 years, Let the World Burn, as an EP on March 4, 2022.

In December 2018, Demmel joined Slayer for a few shows on their final European tour, filling in for his friend Gary Holt who left the tour to be home with his dying father.

In summer 2019, Demmel joined forces with Overkill vocalist Bobby "Blitz" Ellsworth and two-fourths of Metal Allegiance (bassist Mark Menghi and drummer Mike Portnoy) in the supergroup/cover band BPMD, which released their first album, American Made, in June 2020.

In 2020, Demmel contributed a guest guitar solo to the song Drowning In My Head, by Scottish groove metal band Catalysis.

Demmel filled in for Dave Linsk (who was unable to perform) at an Overkill concert in New Jersey on November 13, 2021, and two months later, he filled in for Willie Adler during Lamb of God's performance at ShipRocked.

In April 2022, Demmel filled in as bassist for Lamb of God, and in October of that year performed with the band as the first time they had ever played with three guitarists live.

In January 2023, on ShipRocked, Demmel, Vixen's Tyson Leslie, and Jack Ivins composed the backing band for Living Colour's Corey Glover.

Demmel performed on Kerry King's 2024 solo debut album From Hell I Rise, as well as Category 7's self-titled debut album.

== Equipment ==
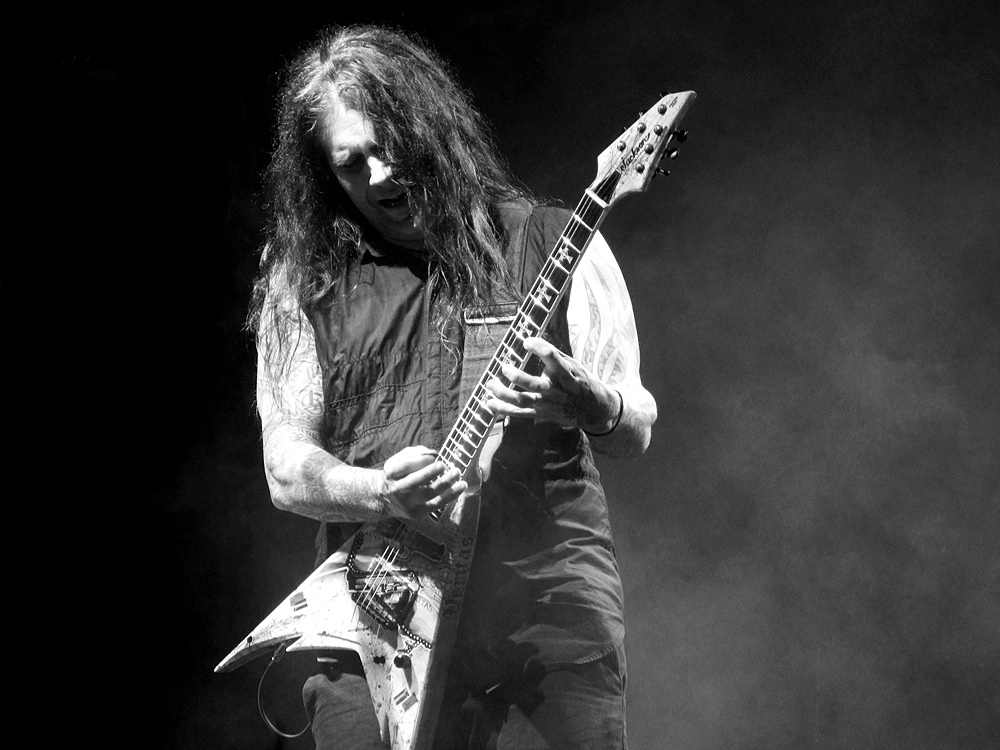
Demmel performing with Machine Head in 2011

Since his days with Vio-Lence, Demmel has always used Jackson guitars. He first used Randy Rhoads models, then later in the 1990s he began using a white King V. When he joined Machine Head he had his white V and a Jackson Warrior which can be seen in the videos for "Imperium" and "Days Turn Blue to Gray". Around the time of The Blackening's release he had his own signature V with Jackson, named The Demmelition King V.

For amplification, he uses Peavey 5150 and 6505 amplifiers with Marshall 1960BV cabinet in the studio. When playing live, he turned to the Axe-FX pre-amplifier for practical reasons.

== Discography ==
=== Vio-lence ===
- Eternal Nightmare (1988)
- Oppressing the Masses (1990)
- Torture Tactics (1991)
- Nothing to Gain (1993)
- Let the World Burn (2022)

=== Torque ===
- Torque (1996)

=== Machine Head ===
- Through the Ashes of Empires (2003)
- The Blackening (2007)
- Unto the Locust (2011)
- Bloodstone & Diamonds (2014)
- Catharsis (2018)

=== BPMD ===
- American Made (2020)

=== Category 7 ===
- Category 7 (2024)

=== Kerry King ===
- From Hell I Rise (2024)

Preceded by Ahrue Luster	Machine Head lead guitarist 2003–2018	Succeeded by Vogg
