= Thrash of the Titans =

2001 benefit concert

Thrash of the Titans concert poster

Thrash of the Titans was a benefit concert held on August 11, 2001, at the Maritime Hall in San Francisco, California. The concert was a co-benefit for Testament vocalist Chuck Billy, who was diagnosed with germ cell seminoma (a rare form of cancer); and Chuck Schuldiner, leader of the death metal band Death, who was also battling cancer. The Master of Ceremonies for the evening was S.O.D. vocalist Billy Milano. The concert was organized by Walter Morgan. The show was announced in May 2001, and all 2,300 tickets quickly sold out.

The concert focused primarily on Bay Area thrash metal, a popular and influential metal scene in the 1980s and early 1990s (of which Testament played a big part), and featured the reunions of then-defunct Bay Area bands Heathen, Death Angel, Vio-lence (minus Robb Flynn, who declined to participate), Forbidden Evil, Sadus, Legacy (an early version of Testament), and then partially defunct Exodus (with Paul Baloff). As a result of the show, Exodus, Heathen and Death Angel all officially reunited and released new albums. Forbidden would reunite again in 2007 and released a new album, called Omega Wave, three years later.

Also appearing at the concert were Anthrax and S.O.D., who are all friends of Chuck Billy's. Lȧȧz Rockit were scheduled to appear, but had to pull out at the last minute, due to singer Michael Coons being admitted to a rehabilitation center, and were replaced by Flotsam and Jetsam. M.O.D. were also scheduled to appear, but with the show running long, Billy Milano announced that M.O.D. would play a show in Oakland the next week, and that tickets to the Thrash of the Titans would be honored.

Beginning with Heathen at 3 pm, the show featured ten bands, with Legacy taking the stage just after 2am. Legacy, a precursor to Testament, featured Steve "Zetro" Souza on vocals, John Tempesta on drums, and Alex Skolnick on lead guitar. Skolnick's appearance marked his first playing thrash metal since quitting Testament in 1993, and eventually led to his rejoining the band. Also appearing with Legacy were Paul Bostaph, the original drummer of Forbidden Evil (who was then with Slayer) and Steve Di Giorgio, bassist for Sadus and formerly of Death, Autopsy and Iced Earth. Chuck Billy himself joined Legacy for the last song of the night, "Into the Pit". The show featured many other guest appearances, including Steve Souza joining Exodus and Paul Baloff for a duet on "Brain Dead". Thrash of the Titans marked one of the last live appearances of Exodus frontman Paul Baloff, who died of a stroke just six months later, on February 2, 2002. Death's Chuck Schuldiner also died of brain cancer four months after the benefit, on December 13, 2001.

== Performers ==
In order of appearance:

- Heathen
- Flotsam and Jetsam
- Sadus
- Forbidden Evil
- Death Angel
- Exodus (with Paul Baloff)
- S.O.D.
- Anthrax
- Vio-lence
- Legacy (early Testament, featuring Eric Peterson, Alex Skolnick, Steve "Zetro" Souza, Jon Allen, Derrick Ramirez, John Tempesta, Paul Bostaph, Steve Di Giorgio, Greg Christian, Louie Clemente and Chuck Billy)

== See also ==
- Bay Area thrash metal
- Testament
- Chuck Billy
- Chuck Schuldiner
