= Torture Tactics =

EP by Vio-lence
- Released: 1991
- Recorded: 1989/1991
- Genre: Thrash metal
- Length: 18:18
- Label: Megaforce/Caroline

Vio-lence chronology
Oppressing the Masses (1990)	Torture Tactics (1991)	Nothing to Gain (1993)

Professional ratings
Review scores
Source	Rating
AllMusic	1.5/5 stars
Robert Christgau	C−

Torture Tactics is an EP recorded by the San Francisco Bay Area thrash metal band Vio-lence in 1991. It was released originally on Megaforce Records and the studio tracks are old songs from the demo times of Vio-lence.

The song "Torture Tactics" was deleted from the previous album; however, it can be found on the Japanese edition of Oppressing the Masses. This EP is the only release besides the Japanese edition of Oppressing the Masses to include "Torture Tactics."

"Officer Nice (live)" was a fake live track. The live intro is taken from Vio-lence's Hallandale, FL show from August 1988. "Dicks of Death" and "Gutterslut" were the two outtakes from the 1989 Oppressing the Masses sessions.

== Track listing ==
No.	Title	Length
1.	"Torture Tactics"	5:21
2.	"Officer Nice" (Live)	5:49
3.	"Gutterslut"	3:24
4.	"Dicks of Death"	3:39

== Credits ==
- Sean Killian - lead vocals
- Phil Demmel - guitars
- Robb Flynn - guitars
- Dean Dell - bass
- Perry Strickland - drums
