= Machine Head (band) =

American heavy metal band

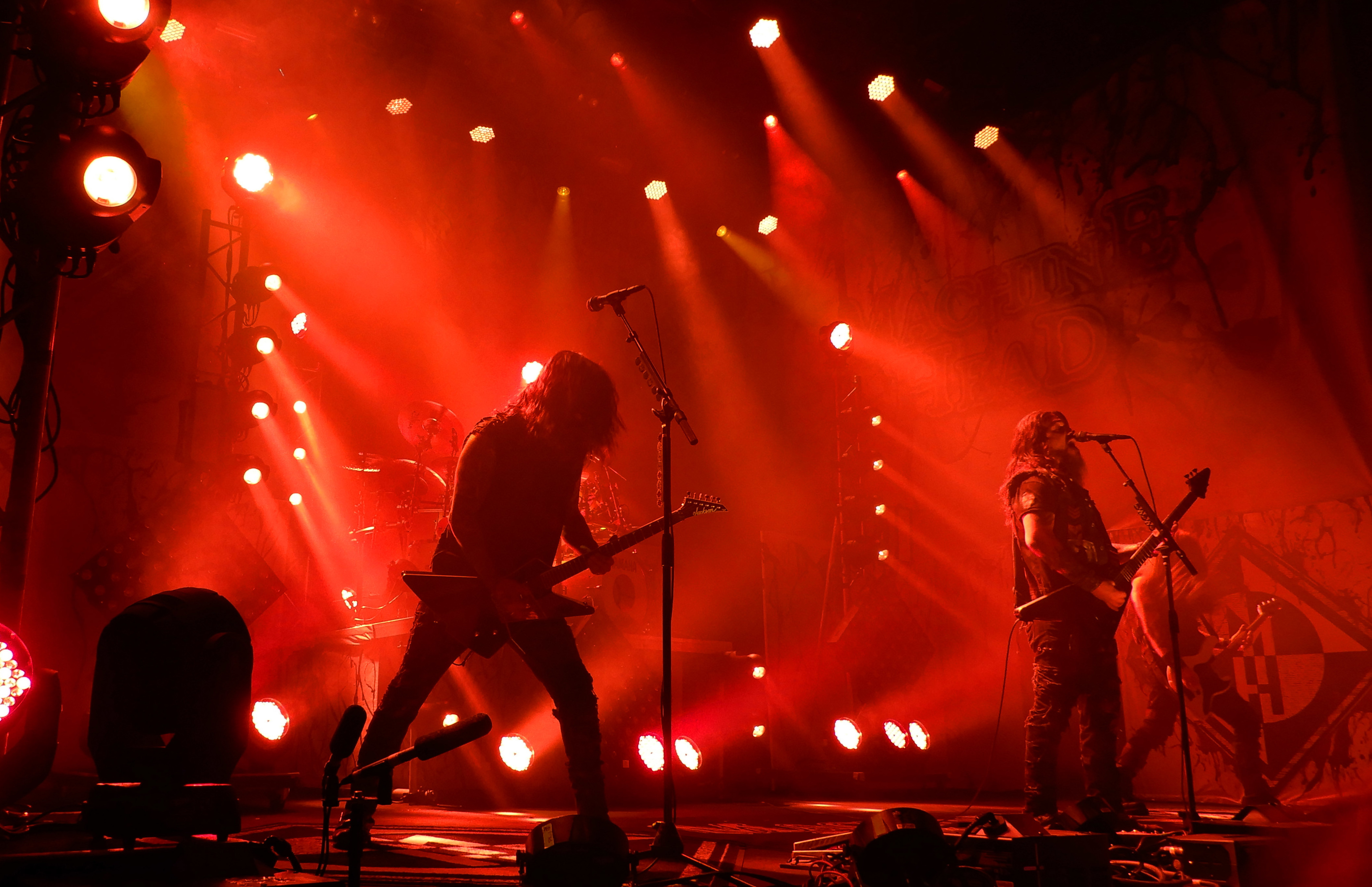
- Machine Head performing in La Rochelle, France in 2018. From left to right: Dave McClain, Phil Demmel, Robb Flynn and Jared MacEachern.

Background information
- Origin: Oakland, California, U.S.
- Genres: Groove metal; thrash metal; nu metal; alternative metal
- Years active: 1991–present
- Labels: Roadrunner; Nuclear Blast; Imperium
- Spinoff of: Vio-lence
- Members: Robb Flynn; Jared MacEachern; Matt Alston
- Past members: Adam Duce; Tony Costanza; Logan Mader; Chris Kontos; Dave McClain; Ahrue Luster; Phil Demmel; Wacław Kiełtyka; Reece Scruggs
- Website: machinehead1.com

Machine Head is an American heavy metal band from Oakland, California. The band was formed in 1991 by vocalist/guitarist Robb Flynn, who remains the only original member of the band. Machine Head's aggressive musicianship made it one of the pioneering bands in the new wave of American heavy metal. Its current lineup comprises Flynn, bassist Jared MacEachern, and drummer Matt Alston. Bassist Adam Duce, guitarists Logan Mader, Ahrue Luster, Phil Demmel, Wacław Kiełtyka and Reece Scruggs, and drummers Tony Costanza, Chris Kontos and Dave McClain are former members of the band; Mader and Kontos toured with the band in 2019 and 2020 as part of the 25th anniversary tour for its first album, Burn My Eyes (1994).

Machine Head's first four albums earned the band a growing fan base in Europe; however, the band would not have success in the United States until later releases. The band drew controversy with its fourth album, Supercharger (2001), which was released three weeks after the September 11 attacks; its only single, "Crashing Around You", and its music video (which featured burning buildings) was pulled from all media outlets. The band nearly disbanded in 2002 after negotiating off its label Roadrunner Records as a result of the controversy, however the band would eventually re-sign with the label.

Having experimented with elements of groove metal and nu metal in its early releases, Machine Head changed to a more traditional thrash metal sound and longer songs with its sixth album, The Blackening (2007), which drew critical acclaim and was chosen as Album of the Decade by Metal Hammer in 2010; the album's first single, "Aesthetics of Hate", also earned a Grammy Award nomination. The band achieved similar success with its next two albums, Unto the Locust (2011) and Bloodstone & Diamonds (2014), before again experimenting with nu metal on its ninth album, Catharsis (2018). Machine Head reverted to its groove and thrash metal roots on the follow-up album, Of Kingdom and Crown (2022), which was its first concept album. Their latest studio album is 2025's Unatoned.

Machine Head has released eleven studio albums, two live albums, one video album, 13 singles and 15 music videos. Four of the band's studio albums have been certified silver in the United Kingdom, and the band's highest peak on the Billboard 200 came with Bloodstone & Diamonds at number 21. As of 2013, the band has sold over three million records worldwide.

== History ==
=== Formation and Burn My Eyes (1991–1995) ===
On October 12, 1991, vocalist/guitarist Robb Flynn attended the Day on the Green festival in Oakland, California, featuring Metallica, Queensrÿche, Faith No More and Soundgarden. Unhappy with the creative direction of then-current band Vio-lence, he became inspired to form his own band. Later that evening, he asked friend, bassist and longtime Vio-lence fan Adam Duce to join his then-unnamed side project, which became Machine Head. At the point of the band's formation, Flynn had written "Death Church" and "Blood for Blood"—both of which Vio-lence had rejected. Four months after the band's formation, Flynn parted ways with Vio-lence after a physical fight between the band members and a local gang. (Note: The incident would be later retold on Catharsis in the song "Triple Beam".) Flynn then recruited guitarist Logan Mader and drummer Tony Costanza. Despite the popular belief that it came from the Deep Purple album of the same name, Flynn settled on the name Machine Head purely because he thought it "sounded cool". The band played their first show at a house party in Oakland on August 15, 1992. The band then started jamming in a local warehouse shared with four punk rock bands. Machine Head recorded a demo in a friend's bedroom, funded with US$800. Monte Conner representing Roadrunner Records listened to the demo and signed the band; the night of signing the record contract, Flynn nearly died of a heroin overdose.

Machine Head entered Fantasy Studios in Berkeley, California to record its debut album Burn My Eyes. Not long into production, Constanza left the band and was replaced by Chris Kontos. Most of the songs on the album were songs written by Flynn and Duce during the time Flynn was not in a band, about "being pissed off" from his previous struggles in Vio-lence, as well as both of their battles with illegal drugs. Produced by Colin Richardson, the album was released on August 9, 1994. The album shipped nearly 400,000 copies worldwide, becoming Roadrunner Records' best-selling debut album. Allmusic reviewer John Franck stated "Burn My Eyes is a bone-shattering exercise in brutality".

Not long after Burn My Eyes's release Machine Head started touring heavily in support of the album, opening for Slayer in Europe in the latter half of 1994, a tour which ended with their own headline show at the London Astoria. Following the success of the support tour, the band returned to Europe for a headline tour in early 1995, performing in the same venues they opened for Slayer. The band would return to Europe for the summer festival season but Kontos refused to tour and the band drafted Walter Ryan for the festival dates. On the band's return to the US, Kontos was fired because he was not keeping to touring commitments, and Kontos went on to play drums with Testament. When Machine Head began auditioning drummers, Flynn received a phone call from Igor Cavalera and music journalist Borivoj Krgin, who recommended him to Dave McClain, then of Sacred Reich. After McClain initially declined, the band began auditioning other potential drummers but received another call from McClain, who accepted the offer. McClain was hired after the audition, leaving Sacred Reich.

=== The More Things Change... and The Burning Red (1996–2000) ===
After touring for Burn My Eyes, Machine Head entered the studio on June 10, 1996, to record its second studio album, The More Things Change..., with Richardson producing and mixing for a second time. The band expected to release the album in October of that year, but its release was delayed due to McClain breaking his leg and problems with its recording, including guitar and vocal tracks being erased for no apparent reason and a protracted mixing process that lasted four months. The album was ultimately released on March 24, 1997, and debuted at number 138 on the Billboard 200 albums chart. By July 1998, the album had sold 400,000 copies worldwide. Machine Head toured in Europe with Napalm Death, Coal Chamber and Skinlab, then went on the first Ozzfest for the first tours in support of the album.

The band's upward trajectory took a personal toll on the members, who individually began struggling with substance abuse and mental health issues; Mader showed up to a practice session late, high on methamphetamine, cursing at and insulting the band members; and quit the band later that day. Ahrue Luster replaced him and finished touring, while Mader toured with Soulfly in support of their self-titled debut album.

After three years of touring and working with producer Ross Robinson, Machine Head released its third studio album, The Burning Red, on July 27, 1999. The band added new elements to its music, including rapping vocals, with Luster's influence moving the band in a more melodic direction. This album, along with the band's change in image and musical direction was highly criticized, with critics and fans alike accusing the band of "selling out". Nevertheless, McClain stated they weren't trying to sound like popular bands but "wanted to sound different". Rick Anderson of Allmusic stated Machine Head was "sounding a bit looser and less constricted musically than they have in the past". The Burning Red went on to become Machine Head's second best-selling album, and debuted at number 88 on the Billboard 200.

The band then proceeded to perform on the Livin la Vida Loco tour with Coal Chamber, Slipknot, Amen and Dope. The tour caused tension between Machine Head and a then up-and-coming Slipknot when the latter's stage show of nine people struggled to physically fit on stage with the gear of the other headlining acts; additionally, Robinson―who signed Slipknot to his own label―gave a series of interviews criticizing Machine Head, which soured their relationship. The two bands would eventually reconcile after Slipknot's success became undeniable.

=== Supercharger and Through the Ashes of Empires (2001–2005) ===
Machine Head finished touring for The Burning Red and entered a studio with producer Johnny K to record Supercharger. Debuting at number 115 on the Billboard 200, the album was released on October 2, 2001. The album met the same criticism as The Burning Red, especially for the ever-present rapping vocals. Blabbermouth.net reviewer Borivoj Krgin stated Supercharger "is likely to disappoint everyone who is expecting the Bay Area quartet to return to the ultra-testosterone-charged sounds of their first two albums".

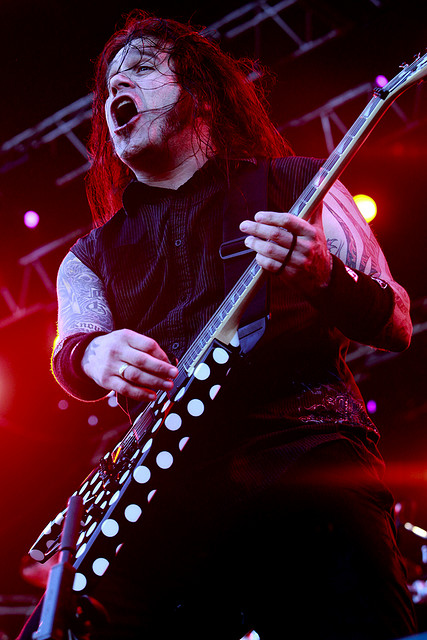
Guitarist Phil Demmel performing in 2009

Machine Head released a single for "Crashing Around You" as well as a music video. The video was released several weeks after the September 11 attacks, and was banned from MTV for the depictions of falling buildings. Roadrunner Records, expecting to make a fair profit from album promotions, dropped the band's funding, causing Machine Head to leave the label. At the same time the band was leaving Roadrunner, Luster departed the band after a dispute over side projects; in retrospect, he described the situation as "a bunch of young egos".

By 2002, Machine Head had sold over 1.3 million albums worldwide, and overall Supercharger (mixed by Colin Richardson) would go on to sell 250,000 copies worldwide, which was their lowest selling album to date. Once the tour for the album had been completed, Machine Head and Roadrunner Records mutually decided to sever ties with regards to distribution in North America and around the world, however to fill the ties, the band released Hellalive (also mixed by Richardson) which was a recording of a Brixton Academy, London set.

In 2002, Luster left the band and was temporarily replaced by Phil Demmel, who played in thrash band Vio-lence alongside Flynn. Demmel played some festival shows with Machine Head (including a headlining slot at the With Full Force festival in Germany). Then with Demmel not being able to commit to the band, he and Machine Head parted ways. The remainder of the band starting writing songs for the next album (eventually Through the Ashes...), and hoping to get signed to a record label. They recorded a short demo, including a radio-style song called "Pins and Needles", and an Electronic Press Kit for the companies, also hoping they can get signed on the strength of their previous efforts. Nearly every record label in the music industry rejected the four track demo.

After Machine Head's European tour, Luster returned to his family business and the band started writing together as a three-piece, while leaving a position open for Demmel. In March 2003, Demmel joined Machine Head as a full-time guitarist and started writing with the band. By June 2003, Machine Head entered a studio with Flynn producing. On October 31, 2003, Machine Head released Through the Ashes of Empires in Europe.

The band was turned down by multiple record labels in the United States, until Roadrunner USA, interested in the new album, offered Machine Head another record contract. Machine Head accepted the offer on the grounds that the band owns 100% of the music. On April 20, 2004, Through the Ashes of Empires was released in the United States with a bonus track for the Americans' long wait for the album's release. The album debuted at number 88 on the Billboard 200. The band released a single for "Imperium", the video for which received heavy rotation on MTV. Eduardo Rivadavia of AllMusic stated Through the Ashes of Empires "marked a return to form in no uncertain terms".

Machine Head headlined the True Metal stage at the 2005 Wacken Open Air festival to 40,000 fans—the band's largest headlining crowd at the time. The band released a DVD containing a full sold-out concert held at the Brixton Academy in December 2004, a documentary, and music videos. The DVD debuted at number 13 on the U.S. music video charts. They also played in Dubai for the annual Dubai Desert Rock Festival in 2005. This was their first show in the Middle East. The band also played at the farewell concert of Böhse Onkelz on the Euro Speedway Lausitz.

=== The Blackening (2006–2009) ===
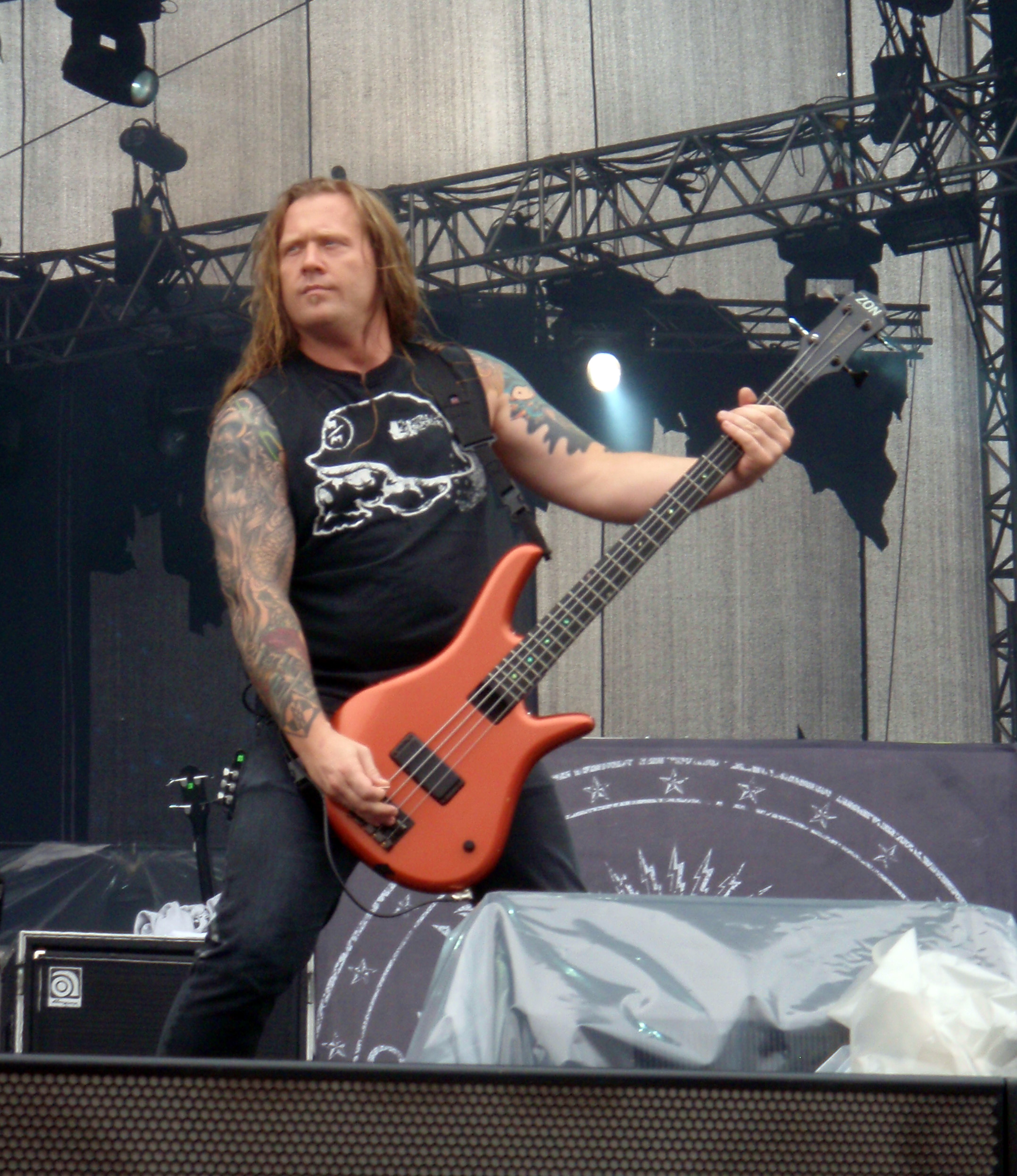
Adam Duce from Machine Head performing at 2009 Sonisphere Festival in Kirjurinluoto, Pori, Finland

Machine Head's sixth studio album, titled The Blackening, was released in North America on March 27, 2007. It entered the Billboard 200 at number 53, the highest charting position for the band at that time, with first-week sales of 15,000. It also made the top 20 in several European countries. Robb Flynn stated during an interview that the band are fans of Rush and received a great deal of influence from their album A Farewell to Kings while creating The Blackening.

The album received positive reviews from music critics, with some labeling it the best metal album of 2007. Blabbermouth.net reviewer Don Kaye awarded the album a 9.5 out of 10, saying The Blackening is "one of the purest, finest, most powerful expressions of modern heavy metal released" and compared it to the 1986 Metallica album Master of Puppets, while Allmusic editor Thom Jurek described the album as "an over the top rage and pummelfest with all the qualities that earned the group its enormous fan base by touring and recording", praising the songs "Beautiful Mourning", "Halo", and "Now I Lay Thee Down". Rolling Stone reviewer Andy Greene, however, responded negatively as he was displeased with the songs running over ten minutes.

Machine Head toured North America with Lamb of God, Trivium and Gojira in early 2007 to promote The Blackening, and opened for Megadeth and Heaven & Hell in April 2007. A European tour saw the band make an appearance at the Download Festival in Donington Park. Shortly after, the band announced a co-headlining tour with Trivium of Japan, Europe, and Australia titled The Black Crusade from October to December. Other bands on the bill included Arch Enemy, DragonForce (Europe only) and Shadows Fall (Europe only). On June 12, 2007, at the Metal Hammer Golden Gods Awards, the band won the award for "Best Album", and Flynn won the "Golden God" award. Machine Head won Best Album at the Kerrang! Awards 2007 and went on to be chosen as Album of the Decade by Metal Hammer in 2010. The band replaced Bullet for My Valentine supporting Metallica's Wembley Stadium show on July 8, 2007, as Bullet For My Valentine's vocalist Matt Tuck required a tonsillectomy. Machine Head also toured North America with Hellyeah, Nonpoint and Bury Your Dead in early 2008. Machine Head completed a world tour where they played Bengaluru, India, Israel, and Dubai, UAE in March 2008.

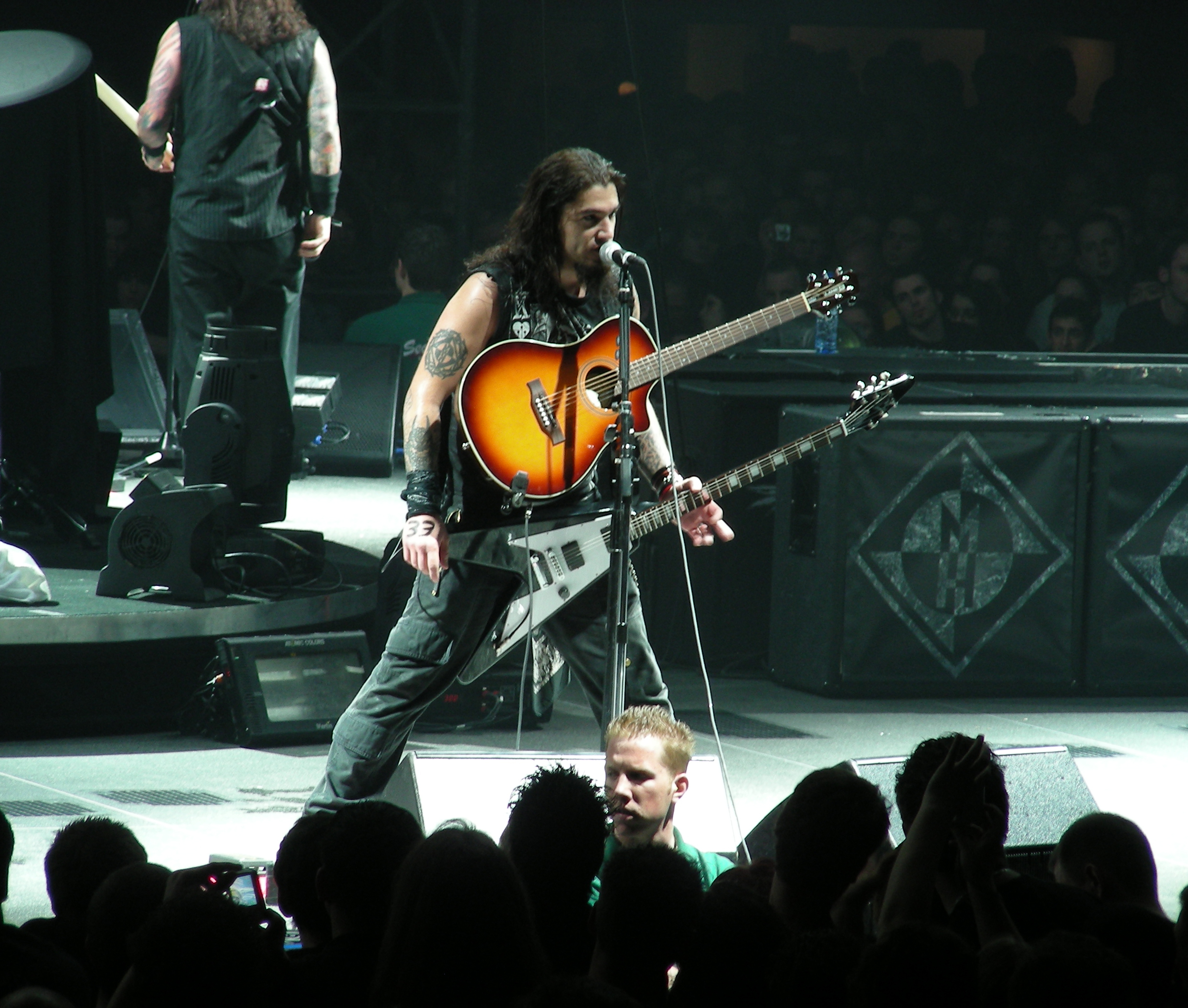
Robb Flynn with Machine Head as the support band for Metallica in Rotterdam 2009

In October 2008, the band toured in Australia with Slipknot. The band then toured Europe with Slipknot and Children of Bodom in November and December. The band recorded a version of Iron Maiden's classic, "Hallowed Be Thy Name" for a Kerrang! tribute compilation album, entitled Maiden Heaven: A Tribute to Iron Maiden; this song was played live multiple times since its release and has become a permanent in their current touring setlists. Amongst other bands who appeared on the album were label mates, Dream Theater and Trivium.

It was announced on August 10, 2008, that Machine Head and Austin, Texas based band The Sword would be opening for Metallica at ten shows in January 2009. In a 2008 interview conducted with Phil Demmel, he revealed that with Machine Head's upcoming touring commitments, the band would not have chance to write a follow-up album until at least 2010, for an expected 2011 release date. Machine Head toured with The Sword in Metallica's World Magnetic Tour for the Death Magnetic album from 2008 to 2009. Machine Head also opened for Megadeth, Slayer and Suicide Silence on the Canadian Carnage tour in late June. Machine Head reportedly cancelled their appearance at the Sonisphere Festival in the UK because they had disagreements with the staff over their slot. They thought they should play after Limp Bizkit. However, a week before the Sonisphere festival took place on August 1 and 2, Machine Head agreed to take back their slot below Limp Bizkit. Their appearance was kept secret until the day they played. In August 2009, they won the Inspiration Award at the 2009 Kerrang! Awards. It was announced on the August 31, that Machine Head would tour through Europe and UK in 2010 with Hatebreed, Bleeding Through, and All Shall Perish in what will be known as "The Black Procession", as well as adding dates for an Australian and New Zealand tour cycle in March. This will be the last time the band tour in support of The Blackening before writing the next album, as Dave McClain described in an interview, before their Belfast show in Northern Ireland.

=== Unto the Locust (2010–2012) ===
In November 2010, Machine Head began writing and demoing new material for their seventh studio album, Unto the Locust. With Robb Flynn acting as producer, Machine Head officially began recording the album on April 16, 2011, at Green Day's Jingletown Studios in Oakland, California.

In the summer of 2011, Machine Head toured as a part of the Rockstar Mayhem Festival. During the tour, the band debuted a new song off of Unto the Locust, entitled "Locust". The song was later released on Amazon and iTunes on June 14, 2011. Unto the Locust was released on September 27, 2011, to critical acclaim. The album charted in several countries, including number 22 in the US (the first time the band had ever cracked the top 25 in US) and at number 5 in Germany.

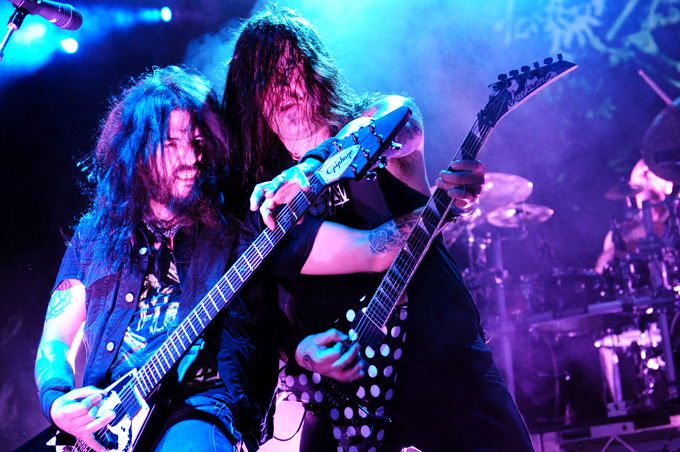
Robb Flynn (left) and Phil Demmel (right) in 2012

After the release of Unto the Locust, Machine Head began its Eight Plague Tour and during the first European leg, the band was supported by Bring Me the Horizon, DevilDriver, and Darkest Hour. On the North American leg, Machine Head was supported by Suicide Silence, Darkest Hour, and Rise to Remain (although Rise to Remain was later forced to drop out).

In 2012, Machine Head headlined the Soundwave Festival in Australia. The band also played at the 2012 Download Festival, Metalcamp, and Graspop festivals, as well as headlining both Bloodstock Open Air and the Wacken Festival. Machine Head were also scheduled to be part of the first-ever Mayhem Festival cruise, until it was cancelled.

On September 10, Machine Head announced a North American tour with Dethklok, All That Remains and The Black Dahlia Murder, beginning with a "Warm Up" show on October 24, the tour started on October 30 and ended on December 8. On September 14, Machine Head won the "Best International Band" award at the 2012 Metal Hammer awards in Berlin, Germany. On October 1, Machine Head announced the release of "Machine Fucking Head Live", the band's first live album since 2003's Hellalive. The album featured 15 live recordings from the band's various 2011-2012 tours and was released on November 13 on a two disc set or download with 4 bonus tracks, with pre-orders of the album having a six track rarities & B-sides EP.

On November 13, Machine Head announced cancellation of their North American tour dates from the 13 to the 23 due to Robb Flynn requiring emergency surgery to treat an inguinal hernia.

In a November 2012 interview, Machine Head guitarist Phil Demmel revealed that the band planned to begin writing new material for their eighth studio album in 2013 and hoped that they would begin recording it before the end of the year.

=== Bloodstone & Diamonds (2013–2015) ===
On February 22, 2013, the band announced that bassist/founding member Adam Duce had left the band, albeit on seemingly friendly terms. Four days later, however, Flynn revealed in his online blog that he fired Duce because of ongoing differences. His departure made Flynn the only remaining original member of Machine Head still with the band. As of March 2013, Unto the Locust has sold 100,000 copies in the United States, making it their third quickest-selling album behind The Blackening and Supercharger which have sold 260,000 in two weeks and 250,000 copies in four months in the United States respectively. The band began the process of searching for a temporary bassist for the 2013 Rockstar Energy Drink Mayhem Festival in the U.S. For a limited time, the band accepted and reviewed YouTube submissions. On June 24, 2013, the band announced that former Sanctity rhythm guitarist and vocalist Jared MacEachern had joined the band as their new bassist. Robb Flynn said of MacEachern: "Monte Conner recommended Jared since he was already on the tour, and that ended up being a great call. Jared flew out a few days before the tour and rehearsed with us and did great." Phil Demmel continued: — "There were dozens of amazing players, and it was interesting to watch each one take on our tunes. One of our biggest criteria for this gig was to be able to sing the high harmonies. That was our litmus test. And Jared passed with flying colors.".

On October 2, 2013, the band announced that they signed with Nuclear Blast. In February 2014, the band entered the studio to record their new album, Bloodstone & Diamonds, for a late summer release.

In early 2014, Duce filed a lawsuit against his former band and manager in federal court "for trademark infringement, breach of fiduciary duty, breach of partnership agreement, intentional and negligent interference with prospective economic relations, negligence, defamation and unfair competition, and wanted the band enjoined from using the Machine Head marks." The lawsuit was settled out of court on July 2 with undisclosed terms. In August 2014, Flynn announced the track listing for Bloodstone & Diamonds, consisting of 12 tracks along with its artwork.

Bloodstone & Diamonds was released on November 7, 2014, to positive reviews from fans and critics alike, with many saying how the addition of MacEachern brought a sense of rejuvenation to the band. The album debuted at No. 21 on the Billboard 200, becoming the band's highest-charting album ever. The band embarked on a lengthy world tour in support of the album, including a leg of European shows, two American legs and various others in Japan, Australia and New Zealand. By August 2016, the album had sold 200,000 copies worldwide, allowing the band to recoup the advance they received from Nuclear Blast.

=== Catharsis, lineup changes and stand-alone singles (2016–2020) ===
On June 1, 2016, a stand-alone single titled "Is There Anybody Out There?" premiered on Sirius XM Octane, and on June 3, the single was available for digital download. On March 17, 2017, the band were featured on American horror movie The Devil's Candy's soundtrack along with Ghost and Slayer. In June 2017, it was reported that Machine Head was in the studio working on new material. In September 2017, the band announced the new album Catharsis for a January 2018 release with an accompanying world tour.

On September 28, 2018, Robb Flynn posted a live video on Facebook to explain that Demmel and McClain had left Machine Head earlier in the week, but that they would both complete the band's fall tour. The announcement was mistakenly reported on by news sources as a disbandment, due to Flynn's referral to the current run of shows as a "farewell tour". Flynn later clarified that it was "the farewell tour of this lineup, this era of Machine Head. This is not the farewell tour of Machine Head." Demmel later said in an interview that he left the band because he "didn't like [his] job anymore" and did not like the musical direction that Flynn had been taking the band over the last three years.

On March 23, 2019, Flynn posted a live video on Instagram to announce that Machine Head had held auditions to search for replacements for Demmel and McClain. He said that the process had "been awesome, really good; in fact, really confusing. [I] don't know where we are going. We've got some thinking to do", and in regards to the musicians taking part in the auditions, he said, "you might not know some of these guys" while "some of [them] you may." Two days later, it was announced that early members Logan Mader and Chris Kontos, who both appeared on Burn My Eyes, would reunite with the band for a tour celebrating the album's 25th anniversary. The band later re-recorded the full album live in the studio and announced plans to release the tracks one by one ahead of the tour. On the possibility of recording new original material with Mader and Kontos, Flynn said, "Nothing's certain right now. I'm not sure what that is at the moment. We're really just focused on re-learning how to play the Burn My Eyes songs. But we'll be out on the road for a while together. I think that I could see Machine Head forward with just a constant flow of new music."

On September 28, 2019, a year on from announcing the departure of Demmel and McClain, the band announced Decapitated guitarist Wacław Kiełtyka and Devilment drummer Matt Alston as their replacements. A month later, Machine Head digitally released the stand-alone single "Do or Die". On February 14, 2020, Machine Head released another stand-alone single, "Circle the Drain".

Whilst the COVID-19 pandemic made live performances impossible, Robb Flynn established the streaming format Electric Happy Hour. As early as March 2020, he had streamed a short performance of just a few songs, using only an acoustic guitar and accompanied by his son Wyatt on the cello. More streamed acoustic performances followed, initially on Facebook and Instagram. Then, in April 2020, Flynn established weekly performances as part of a live stream on Machine Head's Facebook page, which he called Acoustic Happy Hour. When the social distancing rules were relaxed in September 2020, bassist Jared MacEachern was able to take part in Flynn's weekly streaming performances, and the initial acoustic sessions quickly turned into Electric Happy Hour, in which the two musicians now used electric guitars and basses, and later added drums from the tape. Some of the drum tracks used were recorded by drummer Matt Alston in England, but he was never seen in the livestreams. In addition to Facebook, streaming was now also done on Twitch and YouTube. The list of songs varied greatly from gig to gig and included a large number of cover versions. On each release day of a Machine Head studio album, Flynn and MacEachern played through the respective album in its entirety. The last streamed performance, on August 5, 2022, featured ex-drummer Chris Kontos on board to perform the record Burn My Eyes in its entirety on the occasion of its 28th birthday.

In June 2020, the band put out a dual single known as Civil Unrest featuring Jesse Leach of Killswitch Engage on the track "Stop the Bleeding", a song written about the George Floyd protests, while another song on the B-side known as "Bulletproof", was also written about the protests. A music video was eventually released for "Stop the Bleeding" after its release. Five months later, another single entitled "My Hands Are Empty" was released. On June 11, 2021, the band released a new three-track single entitled Arrows in Words from the Sky. The single included the title track, "Become the Firestorm", and "Rotten".

Due to the pandemic, not all band members could participate in the recording process. On both songs for "Civil Unrest" Carlos Cruz from Warbringer can be heard as session drummer. He had already been hired for the single "Do or Die". The drums on "Circle the Drain", "My Hands Are Empty" and the three tracks of Arrows in Words from the Sky were recorded by Navene Koperweiss.

=== Of Kingdom and Crown (2021–2023) ===
On April 12, 2022, Machine Head released a new single entitled "Choke on the Ashes of Your Hate" with an accompanying music video and announced its tenth studio album, Of Kingdom and Crown, released on August 26, 2022, via Nuclear Blast and Imperium Recordings. Along with "Choke on the Ashes of Your Hate" and eight other new songs (three of which are interludes), Of Kingdom and Crown includes all three songs off of Arrows in Words from the Sky, as well as the "My Hands Are Empty" single released over a year prior. As with the stand-alone singles before, Wacław "Vogg" Kiełtyka and Matt Alston were not in the studio for the recordings. Again Navene Koperweiss can be heard on drums. Of Kingdom and Crown is designed as a concept album and tells the story of a blood feud set in a post-apocalyptic future. It is loosely based on the Manga series Attack on Titan. On June 21, the album's sixth song "Unhallowed" was released as the next advance single.

On August 12, 2022, Machine Head played ten songs as unannounced surprise guests at Bloodstock Open Air in England, including the two new releases "Become the Firestorm" and "Choke on the Ashes of Your Hate". It was the band's first performance in front of a live audience since the beginning of the COVID-19 pandemic. It was followed by five concerts in Scotland, called Electric Happy Hour (Live) in reference to the streaming performances. They served as Machine Head's preparation for the Vikings and Lionhearts Tour, a co-headlining tour of Europe with Amon Amarth and The Halo Effect in September and October. In November and December 2022, Machine Head played a total of 39 Electric Happy Hour (Live) concerts in the U.S. On November 3, 2022, Reece Scruggs of Havok made his debut as touring guitarist for Machine Head. Scruggs was filling in for Vogg while Vogg honored prior touring commitments with Decapitated.

In early 2023, Flynn and MacEachern resumed the weekly streaming format Electric Happy Hour. On March 14, the band announced the next chapter of their Electric Happy Hour (Live) Tour with a total of 18 concerts in the US. Only one month later the entire tour was cancelled without replacement. As a reason Machine Head gave problems with the allocation of U.S. work visas for their European band and crew members. Also the band had little luck with the festival season in the summer of 2023: Machine Head played only three of five planned gigs: May 28 at Milwaukee MetalFest (with R. Scruggs on guitar), June 16 as headliners at the 2023 Graspop Metal Meeting in Belgium, and September 16 at the Metal Injection Festival in Anaheim, CA (again with R. Scruggs). Machine Head was also part of the lineup at Blue Ridge Rock Fest in Alton, Halifax, VA on September 7. However, due to adverse weather conditions, their performance had to be cancelled shortly before the start. An interim announced concert at KIWR Rock Fest in Council Bluffs, IA was also canceled the previous month without explanation (August 4). The Electric Happy Hour (Live) concert series continued in October with eleven concerts in South America. For the first time in their history, Machine Head performed in Venezuela and Costa Rica. They also replaced Mudvayne at short notice on November 5 at the Hell & Heaven Metal Fest near Mexico City.

=== Unatoned (2024–present) ===
On January 19, 2024, the band began its Slaughter the Martour world tour with a total of 29 concerts in the U.S. and Canada. This first North America leg featured Fear Factory, Orbit Culture and Gates to Hell as support bands. In mid-March, the tour continued with seven concerts in Australia and New Zealand, again with Fear Factory as support. Machine Head will also be playing various European and US 2024 summer festivals, including Rock am Ring and Rock im Park, Hellfest, Download, Novarock, Greenfield, Graspop, Resurrection Fest, Mystic Festival (Gdansk, Poland), Evil Live (Lisbon), Sonic Temple and Rockville (Daytona).

On February 17, 2024, Vogg announced he had left Machine Head, explaining that Decapitated is his 'absolute No. 1 band' and that Decapitated and Machine Head are both active bands with overlapping tours, creating important scheduling conflicts. In November 2024, the band announced a North American tour for 2025 with In Flames, Lacuna Coil and Unearth as support acts, and released a single, "These Scars Won't Define Us", which featured vocals from all four bands in what Machine Head described as a "Wu Tang Clan-level thrash collaboration"; in doing so, the band announced its eleventh studio album. The album's title, Unatoned, and release date of April 25 were announced in February, along with a second single, "Unbound", and an accompanying music video; the album will be the band's first to feature Scruggs, who was being treated as a full member of the band by December.

During the Summer of 2026 Machine head will be serving as support for Killswitch Engage’s US and Canada tours.

== Musical style and influences ==
Machine Head has been described as groove metal, thrash metal, nu metal, alternative metal, or heavy metal in general. The band is influenced by thrash metal bands such as Metallica, Exodus, Slayer and Testament, traditional heavy metal bands Iron Maiden, crossover thrash bands Suicidal Tendencies and Cro-Mags, groove metal bands Pantera, Exhorder, Sepultura and Fear Factory, grunge/alternative rock-metal bands Nirvana, Soundgarden, Alice in Chains and Rage Against the Machine and hardcore bands Biohazard. Machine Head is considered to be one of the pioneering bands in the new wave of American heavy metal, as well as part of the second wave of thrash metal bands from the 1990s.

Their early albums Burn My Eyes and The More Things Change... show a groove metal and thrash metal approach, similar to bands like Pantera and Exhorder. The albums also featured technical drumming by Chris Kontos and Dave McClain. The band changed their musical direction for the albums The Burning Red (1999) and Supercharger (2001), which have been described as displaying a nu metal sound. These albums featured rapping by Robb Flynn and simpler guitar riffs, but retaining part of their aggressive sound. This change in direction resulted in criticism from many fans because of the popularity of nu metal at the time. Machine Head returned to the groove metal and thrash metal sound of the first two albums with Through the Ashes of Empires (2003).

Machine Head increased the complexity and technicality in their sound for the next album, The Blackening, which partially changes the sound of their first 5 albums in favor of a more classic heavy metal and thrash metal oriented sound, with fully complex song structures and guitar riffs. Unto the Locust features heavier, faster and more complex riffs by both Flynn and Phil Demmel, influenced by classical music, and supported by fast and complex drum patterns by McClain. This is also the first Machine Head's record to include blast beats.

A trademark of Machine Head is Flynn's use of natural harmonics in riffs. Flynn explained his use of harmonics was a happy accident: trying to learn DRI riffs but being unaware of the concept of audio feedback, he emulated it using harmonics.

Flynn makes use of different vocal styles including yelling, raspy singing, clean vocals, screams and death growls; Flynn himself has jokingly called his own singing style "barking in key".

== Band members ==
Current members

- Robb Flynn – lead vocals, guitar (1991–present)
- Jared MacEachern – bass, backing vocals (2013–present)
- Matt Alston – drums (2019–present)

Former members

- Logan Mader – guitar, backing vocals (1991–1998; touring 2019–2021)
- Ahrue Luster – guitar (1998–2002)
- Phil Demmel – guitar, backing vocals (2003–2018; touring 2002)
- Wacław Kiełtyka – guitar (2019–2023; touring 2025, 2026)
- Reece Scruggs – guitar, backing vocals (2024–2026; touring 2022–2024)
- Adam Duce – bass, backing vocals (1991–2013)
- Tony Costanza – drums (1991–1992; died 2020)
- Chris Kontos – drums (1992–1995; touring 2019–2021)
- Dave McClain – drums (1995–2018)

Session musicians

- Carlos Cruz – drums (2019–2020)
- Navene Koperweis – drums (2020–2022)

Touring musicians

- Walter Ryan – drums (1995)
- Zack Ohren – guitar (2025; select dates)
- "Uncle" Ben Eller – guitar (June 2026)

== Discography ==
- Burn My Eyes (1994)
- The More Things Change... (1997)
- The Burning Red (1999)
- Supercharger (2001)
- Through the Ashes of Empires (2003)
- The Blackening (2007)
- Unto the Locust (2011)
- Bloodstone & Diamonds (2014)
- Catharsis (2018)
- Of Kingdom and Crown (2022)
- Unatoned (2025)

== Awards and nominations ==
Year	Award	Work / nominee	Category	Result
2007	Metal Hammer Golden Gods Awards	Robb Flynn	Golden God	Won
2007	Metal Hammer Golden Gods Awards	The Blackening	Album of the Year	Won
2007	Kerrang! Awards	The Blackening	Album of the Year	Won
2007	Danish Metal Awards	The Blackening	Best International Album	Won
2008	Swedish Metal Awards	The Blackening	Best Foreign Metal	Won
2008	Grammy Awards	"Aesthetics of Hate"	Best Metal Performance	Nominated
2009	Metal Hammer Golden Gods Awards	Machine Head	Best Live Band	Won
2010	Metal Hammer Golden Gods Awards	Machine Head	Best Live Band	Won
2012	Loudwire Music Awards	Machine Head	Metal Band of the Year	Nominated
2012	Loudwire Music Awards	"Darkness Within"	Metal Video of the Year	Won
