= List of Agent Steel band members =

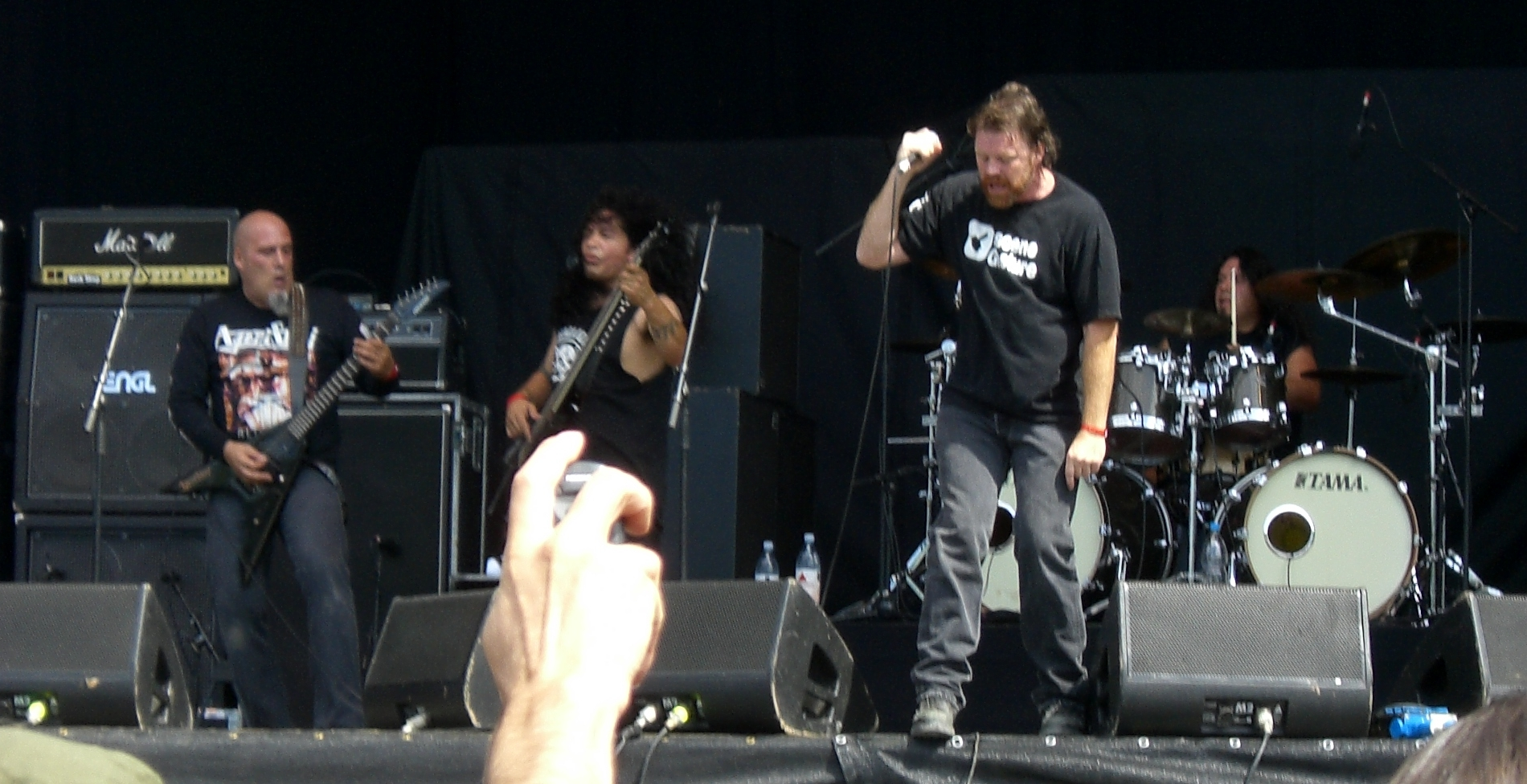
Agent Steel performing live in 2008.

Agent Steel is an American heavy metal band from Los Angeles, California. Formed in 1984, the group originally consisted of vocalist John Cyriis, guitarist Brad Phillips, bassist George "Doom" Robb and drummer Chuck Profus. By the time the band recorded its debut album, guitars were performed by Juan Garcia and Kurt Colfelt. As of 2026, Cyriis is the only remaining original member of the band, with other members including 2024 addition Johnny Moraes, returning guitarist Nikolay Atanasov and 2025 arrivals Alexandre Vilegas on bass and Junior Wendland on drums, respectively.

== History ==
=== 1984–1988 ===
After leaving Abattoir and later Megadeth, vocalist John Cyriis formed Agent Steel in August 1984. The band's initial lineup included bassist George "Doom" Robb and drummer Chuck Profus, with the role of guitarist changing multiple times in quick succession — founding member Brad Phillips was replaced by Mark Marshall and Bill Simmons, the latter of whom was himself soon replaced by Cyriis' former Abattoir bandmate Juan Garcia in time for the band's first shows in September 1984. After the band recorded its first demo 144,000 Gone, Kurt Colfelt replaced Marshall for a second demo later in the year. Before the end of 1984, the band signed with Combat Records and started recording its debut full-length album Skeptics Apocalypse, which was released in the middle of 1985.

In August 1985, Bernie Versailles replaced Colfelt, who left due to "musical and personal differences". After the recording of the EP Mad Locust Rising, Robb was also replaced in early 1986 by Mike Zaputil, with Garcia claiming that the band "needed a new bass player who was more precise, cleaner and faster". After the recording of the band's second album Unstoppable Force, Cyriis and Profus relocated to Florida in early 1987, rebuilding the band with a new lineup, adding guitarists Jay Weslord and James Murphy, and bassist Richard Bateman. After a European tour which spawned the live video Mad Locust Rising: Live at the Hammersmith Odeon June '87, Agent Steel disbanded in June 1988 and Cyriis and Profus briefly continued working in a new group called Pontius Prophet.

=== 1998–2011 ===
In 1998, former members Juan Garcia, Bernie Versailles, Mike Zaputil and Chuck Profus reformed Agent Steel, adding Bruce Hall as the band's new lead vocalist. The new lineup initially used the name Agents of Steel, in an attempt to differentiate itself with John Cyriis no longer a member, although they changed back to the original name after a few months. Zaputil soon stepped back from the project, with Karlos Medina taking his place in time for the recording of three demos, followed by return album Omega Conspiracy in 1999. In May 2001, the band temporarily changed its name to Order of the Illuminati due to legal action by Cyriis. Shortly thereafter, founding member Profus was replaced by Rigo Amezcua. By the summer of 2002, the band had reverted back to its original name.

Agent Steel's first album without Profus, Order of the Illuminati, was released in 2003. The same lineup released Alienigma in 2007, before Medina was replaced by Robert Cardenas that September. By April 2010, Hall had chosen to leave Agent Steel, claiming that "the continual walk in John's [Cyriis] shoes has entirely drained my passion for doing anything other than treating Agent Steel as a cover band". Shortly after Hall's departure, the band announced that it had reunited with original vocalist Cyriis, with tour dates planned for later in 2010. In January 2011, Cyriis had to back out of the band's performances on the 70000 Tons of Metal cruise due to "unfortunate events", with James Rivera of Helstar and Rick Mythiasin of Steel Prophet sharing vocal duties for the shows. Cyriis subsequently returned for a handful of shows, the last of which took place on June 10, 2011 at Sweden Rock Festival, which the band had dubbed the final show with the vocalist (although he denied this onstage).

=== Since 2019 ===
In January 2019, John Cyriis announced that he was relaunching Agent Steel with a brand new lineup, to be unveiled at the group's debut performance at the Keep It True Festival in April. A few days before the show, the lineup was announced as featuring guitarists Damian Giron and Igor Lopes, bassist Joe McGuigan, and drummer Kyle Abbott; Giron and McGuigan did not perform, however, with Leonardo Da Rocha and Hein Willekens, respectively, standing in. Willekens later claimed that he had been asked to fill in just "2.5 days before the gig". In May, Nikolay Atanasov was announced as one of the band's new guitarists. In June, the band announced a new lineup with Atanasov, McGuigan, returning early guitarist Bill Simmons, and new drummer Dennis Kruse Strømberg.

After the release of two demo singles — "Separation of Church and Fate" and "Way of the Mechanism" — Agent Steel's lineup changed again around June 2020, when Vinicius Carvalho joined as third guitarist, McGuigan was replaced by Eddie Webb, and Rasmus Kjær took over from Strømberg. Within just a few weeks, Webb had been replaced by Shuichi Oni and Simmons had left. This lineup released No Other Godz Before Me, the band's first studio album in 14 years and the first with Cyriis in 23 years, in 2021. This was followed by the single "Terminator of Souls" later in the year. In January 2022, the band announced that Atanasov had been "suspended" from the band pending litigation, although the guitarist later disputed this, claiming that he had left of his own accord.

The band remained relatively inactive during 2022, before announcing a new lineup in July 2023 featuring guitarist Justin Zych, bassist Kelly Conlon and drummer Lamar Little (with Carvalho remaining). Nikolay Atanasov briefly returned for a European tour in November 2023. In late 2024, Cyriis performed with a new lineup including former bassist George Robb, plus new members Johnny Moraes (guitar), Ricardo França (guitar) and Marcus Dotta (drums). By early 2025, Robb had been replaced by Andre Mellado. Further lineup changes that year included Atanasov returning as guitarist, Mellado being replaced by Alexandre Vilegas and Junior Wendland replacing Dotta.

== Members ==
=== Current ===
Image	Name	Years active	Instruments	Release contributions
	John Cyriis	1984–1988; 2010–2011; 2019–present	vocals	all Agent Steel releases from 144,000 Gone (1984) to Mad Locust Rising: Live at the Hammersmith Odeon June '87 (1989), and from "Separation of Church and Fate" (2019) to date
	Nikolay Atanasov	2019–2022; 2023; 2025-present	guitars	"Separation of Church and Fate" (2019); "Way of the Mechanism" (2019); No Other Godz Before Me (2021); "Terminator of Souls" (2021)
	Johnny Moraes	2025–present	guitar	none to date
	Junior Wendland	2025–present	drums	none to date
	Alexandre Vilegas	2025–present	bass	none to date

=== Former ===
Image	Name	Years active	Instruments	Release contributions
	Chuck Profus	1984–1988; 1998–2001; (died 2025)	drums	all Agent Steel releases from 144,000 Gone (1984) to "Forever Black" (2000)
	George "Doom" Robb	1984–1986; 2024–2025	bass	144,000 Gone (1984); untitled second demo (1984); Skeptics Apocalypse (1985); Mad Locust Rising (1986)
	Brad Phillips	1984	guitar	none
	Mark Marshall	1984	guitar	144,000 Gone (1984)
	Bill Simmons	1984; 2019	guitar	"Separation of Church and Fate" (2019); "Way of the Mechanism" (2019)
	Juan Garcia	1984–1987; 1998–2011	guitar; backing vocals	all Agent Steel releases from 144,000 Gone (1984) to Alienigma (2007), except Mad Locust Rising: Live at the Hammersmith Odeon June '87 (1989)
	Kurt Colfelt	1984–1985	guitar	untitled second demo (1984); Skeptics Apocalypse (1985)
	Bernie Versailles	1985–1987; 1998–2011	guitar; backing vocals	all Agent Steel releases from Mad Locust Rising (1986) to Alienigma (2007), except Mad Locust Rising: Live at the Hammersmith Odeon June '87 (1989)
	Mike Zaputil	1986–1987; 1998–1999	bass	Metal Hammer Roadshow 1 (1986); Unstoppable Force (1987); Agents of Steel 1998 demos; Deny the Poison (1999)
	Jay Weslord	1987–1988	guitar	Mad Locust Rising: Live at the Hammersmith Odeon June '87 (1989)
	James Murphy	1987–1988	guitar	Mad Locust Rising: Live at the Hammersmith Odeon June '87 (1989)
	Richard Bateman	1987–1988 (died 2018)	bass	Mad Locust Rising: Live at the Hammersmith Odeon June '87 (1989)
	Bruce Hall	1998–2010	lead vocals	all Agent Steel releases from the Agents of Steel demos (1998) to Alienigma (2007)
	Karlos Medina	1998–2007	bass; backing vocals	all Agent Steel releases from the Agents of Steel demos (1998) to Alienigma (2007)
	Rigo Amezcua	2001–2011	drums	Order of the Illuminati (2003); Earth Under Lucifer (2003); Live @ Dynamo Open Air (2005); Alienigma (2007)
	Robert Cardenas	2007–2011	bass; backing vocals	none
	Joe McGuigan	2019–2020	bass	"Separation of Church and Fate" (2019); "Way of the Mechanism" (2019)
	Kyle Abbott	2019	drums	none
	Igor Lopes	2019	guitar	none
	Damian Giron	2019	guitar	none
	Leonardo Da Rocha	2019	guitar	none
	Dennis Kruse Strømberg	2019–2020	drums	"Separation of Church and Fate" (2019); "Way of the Mechanism" (2019)
	Vinicius Carvalho (aka. Vin Fasqueira/Vin Obscurious)	2020–2023	guitar	No Other Godz Before Me (2021); "Terminator of Souls" (2021)
	Rasmus Kjær	2020–2023	drums	No Other Godz Before Me (2021); "Terminator of Souls" (2021)
	Eddie Webb	2020	bass	none
	Shuichi Oni	2020–2023	bass	No Other Godz Before Me (2021); "Terminator of Souls" (2021)
	Justin Zych	2023	guitar	none
	Kelly Conlon	2023	bass	none
	Lamar Little	2023	drums	none
	Marcus Dotta	2024-2025	drums	none
	Ricardo França	2024-2025	guitar	none
	Andre Mellado	2025	bass	none

=== Touring ===
Image	Name	Years active	Instruments	Notes
	Tim Thomas	2005	guitar	Thomas filled in for Bernie Versailles during a European tour in early 2005.
	James Rivera	2011	lead vocals	Rivera and Mythiasin filled in for John Cyriis at 70000 Tons of Metal in January 2011.
	Rick Mythiasin	2011	lead vocals	Rivera and Mythiasin filled in for John Cyriis at 70000 Tons of Metal in January 2011.
	Hein Willekens	2019	bass	Willekens filled in for Joe McGuigan at the band's first return show in April 2019.

== Lineups ==
Period	Members	Releases
August 1984	John Cyriis — vocals; Brad Phillips — guitar; George Robb — bass; Chuck Profus — drums	none
August/September 1984	John Cyriis — vocals; Mark Marshall — guitar; Bill Simmons — guitar; George Robb — bass; Chuck Profus — drums	none
September–fall 1984	John Cyriis — vocals; Mark Marshall — guitar; Juan Garcia — guitar; George Robb — bass; Chuck Profus — drums	144,000 Gone (1984)
Fall 1984–August 1985	John Cyriis — vocals; Juan Garcia — guitar; Kurt Colfelt — guitar; George Robb — bass; Chuck Profus — drums	untitled second demo (1984); Skeptics Apocalypse (1985)
August 1985–early 1986	John Cyriis — vocals; Juan Garcia — guitar; Bernie Versailles — guitar; George Robb — bass; Chuck Profus — drums	Mad Locust Rising EP (1986)
Early 1986–early 1987	John Cyriis — vocals; Juan Garcia — guitar; Bernie Versailles — guitar; Mike Zaputil — bass; Chuck Profus — drums	Metal Hammer Roadshow 1 (1986); Unstoppable Force (1987)
Early 1987–June 1988	John Cyriis — vocals; Jay Weslord — guitar; James Murphy — guitar; Richard Bateman — bass; Chuck Profus — drums	Mad Locust Rising: Live at the Hammersmith Odeon June '87 (1989)
Band inactive July 1988–1997
1998	Bruce Hall — lead vocals; Juan Garcia — guitar, backing vocals; Bernie Versailles — guitar, backing vocals; Mike Zaputil — bass; Chuck Profus — drums, backing vocals	none
1998–2001 (as Agents of Steel during 1998) (as Order of the Illuminati in 2001)	Bruce Hall — lead vocals; Juan Garcia — guitar, backing vocals; Bernie Versailles — guitar, backing vocals; Karlos Medina — bass, backing vocals; Chuck Profus — drums, backing vocals	Agents of Steel demos (1998); Deny the Poison demo (1999); Omega Conspiracy (1999); "Forever Black" (2000)
Summer 2001–September 2007 (as Order of the Illuminati until 2002)	Bruce Hall — lead vocals; Juan Garcia — guitar, backing vocals; Bernie Versailles — guitar, backing vocals; Karlos Medina — bass, backing vocals; Rigo Amezcua — drums	Order of the Illuminati (2003); Earth Under Lucifer (2003); Live @ Dynamo Open Air (2005); Alienigma (2007)
September 2007–April 2010	Bruce Hall — lead vocals; Juan Garcia — guitar, backing vocals; Bernie Versailles — guitar, backing vocals; Robert Cardenas — bass, backing vocals; Rigo Amezcua — drums	none
May 2010–June 2011	John Cyriis — lead vocals; Juan Garcia — guitar, backing vocals; Bernie Versailles — guitar, backing vocals; Robert Cardenas — bass, backing vocals; Rigo Amezcua — drums	none
Band inactive July 2011–December 2018
January–April 2019	John Cyriis — vocals; Damian Giron — guitar; Igor Lopes — guitar; Joe McGuigan — bass; Kyle Abbott — drums	none
April 2019	John Cyriis — vocals; Leonardo Da Rocha — guitar (stand-in); Igor Lopes — guitar; Hein Willekens — bass (stand-in); Kyle Abbott — drums	none
May–June 2019	John Cyriis — vocals; Nikolay Atanasov — guitar; Joe McGuigan — bass; Kyle Abbott — drums	none
June 2019–June 2020	John Cyriis — vocals; Nikolay Atanasov — guitar; Bill Simmons — guitar; Joe McGuigan — bass; Dennis Kruse Strømberg — drums	"Separation of Church and Fate" (2019); "Way of the Mechanism" (2019)
June–July 2020	John Cyriis — vocals; Nikolay Atanasov — guitar; Bill Simmons — guitar; Vinicius Carvalho — guitar; Eddie Webb — bass; Rasmus Kjær — drums	none
July 2020–January 2022	John Cyriis — vocals; Nikolay Atanasov — guitar; Vinicius Carvalho — guitar; Shuichi Oni — bass; Rasmus Kjær — drums	No Other Godz Before Me (2021); "Terminator of Souls" (2021)
January 2022–July 2023	John Cyriis — vocals; Vinicius Carvalho — guitar; Shuichi Oni — bass; Rasmus Kjær — drums	none
July–November 2023	John Cyriis — vocals; Vinicius Carvalho — guitar; Justin Zych — guitar; Kelly Conlon — bass; Lamar Little — drums	none
November 2023	John Cyriis — vocals; Vinicius Carvalho — guitar; Nikolay Atanasov — guitar (touring); Kelly Conlon — bass; Lamar Little — drums	none
Late 2024–early 2025	John Cyriis — vocals; Johnny Moraes — guitar; Ricardo França — guitar; George Robb — bass; Marcus Dotta — drums	none
Spring 2025	John Cyriis — vocals; Johnny Moraes — guitar; Ricardo França — guitar; Andre Mellado — bass; Marcus Dotta — drums	none to date
Approx. December 2025-present	John Cyriis — vocals; Johnny Moraes — guitar; Nikolay Atanasov — guitar; Alexandre Vilegas — bass; Junior Wendland — drums	none to date
