= Divide and Conquer (album) =

- Cover art by Edward Repka

Studio album by Suicidal Angels
- Released: 10 January 2014
- Studio: Prophecy and Music Factory Studios, Munich, Germany. Zero Gravity studios, Athens, Greece. Soundlodge studios, Rhauderfehn, Germany. Fredman Studios, Gothenburg, Sweden
- Genre: Thrash metal
- Length: 49:51
- Label: NoiseArt
- Producer: Roberto Dimitri Liapakis, Nick Melissourgos

Suicidal Angels chronology
Bloodbath (2012)	Divide and Conquer (2014)	Division of Blood (2016)

Professional ratings
Review scores
Source	Rating
Metalstorm.net	7.9/10

Divide and Conquer is the fifth studio album by Greek thrash metal band Suicidal Angels, released on 10 January 2014. It is their third album for NoiseArt Records, and their second to enter the German official album charts.

The production took place at the Music Factory and Prophecy Studios in Germany, as well as Zero Gravity Studios in Athens. Some parts of the album were edited by Jörg Uken at Soundlodge Studios, based in Rhauderfehn, Germany. The album was mixed and mastering by Fredrik Nordström at the Fredman Studios in Gothenburg, Sweden.

== Track listing ==
All music and arrangements by Nick and Orfeas; All lyrics by Nick.

No.	Title	Length
1.	"Marching over Blood"	3:34
2.	"Seed of Evil"	6:56
3.	"Divide and Conquer"	3:06
4.	"Control the Twisted Mind"	6:56
5.	"In the Grave"	5:23
6.	"Terror Is My Scream"	3:12
7.	"Pit of Snakes"	4:28
8.	"Kneel to the Gun"	3:53
9.	"Lost Dignity"	3:30
10.	"White Wizard"	8:49
Total length:		49:51

== Personnel ==
Suicidal Angels

- Nick Melissourgos – lead vocals, rhythm guitar, lead guitar, production
- Aggelos Lelikakis – bass
- Orfeas Tzortzopoulos – drums
- Chris Tsitsis - lead guitar

Production

- Roberto Dimitri Liapakis - producer
- Jörg Uken - editing
- Fredrik Nordström Mixing, mastering
- Virginia Kakava - photography
- Edward Repka - Cover art
- Timo Pollinger - Layout
