= Division of Blood =

Studio album by Suicidal Angels
- Released: 27 May 2016
- Studio: Soundlodge studios, Rhauderfehn, Germany
- Genre: Thrash metal
- Length: 43:31
- Label: NoiseArt
- Producer: Jörg Uken; Nick Melissourgos

Suicidal Angels chronology
Divide and Conquer (2014)	Division of Blood (2016)	Years of Aggression (2019)

Professional ratings
Review scores
Source	Rating
Rock Hard	7/10
Sputnikmusic	3.5/5

Division of Blood is the sixth studio album by Greek thrash metal band Suicidal Angels, released on 27 May 2016. It is their fourth album for NoiseArt Records, and the third album in a row to enter the German official album charts.

This time, the whole production took place at Soundlodge Studios, based in Rhauderfehn, Germany. All drums, guitars, bass, vocals were recorded there during autumn 2015 by Jörg Uken who also mixed and mastered the album afterwards. It is their first album to feature Gus Drax on lead guitar.

== Track listing ==
All music and arrangements by Nick and Orfeas; All lyrics by Nick.

No.	Title	Length
1.	"Capital of War"	4:25
2.	"Division of Blood"	5:12
3.	"Eternally to Suffer"	4:14
4.	"Image of the Serpent"	2:59
5.	"Set the Cities on Fire"	3:19
6.	"Front Gate"	4:13
7.	"Bullet in the Chamber"	3:25
8.	"Cold Blood Murder"	3:20
9.	"Of Thy Shall Bring the Light"	12:20
Total length:		43:31

== Personnel ==
Suicidal Angels

- Nick Melissourgos – lead vocals, guitar, production
- Aggelos Lelikakis – bass
- Orfeas Tzortzopoulos – drums
- Gus Drax – guitar

Production

- Jörg Uken – production, mixing, mastering
- Nick Melissourgos – production
- Edward Repka – cover art
