= Mad Locust Rising =

EP by Agent Steel
- Released: 1985
- Studio: Indigo Ranch Studios, Malibu, CA.
- Genre: Speed metal; power metal
- Length: 11:44
- Label: Combat
- Producer: Agent Steel

Agent Steel chronology
| Skeptics Apocalypse (1985) | Mad Locust Rising (1985) | Unstoppable Force (1987) |

Mad Locust Rising is an EP by the American heavy metal band Agent Steel, released in 1985, by Combat Records. It was recorded at Indigo Ranch Studios in October 1985 in Malibu, California. The EP features a cover of the Judas Priest song "The Ripper". It is also included on the 1999 reissue of the 1987 album Unstoppable Force. Former bassist Mike Zaputil is credited on the album, but the bass tracks were actually recorded by George Robb, who was then fired after the recordings, while Zaputil joined in early 1986 from Letchen Grey.

== Track listing ==
Side A
| No. | Title | Length |
|---|---|---|
| 1. | "(The Swarm is Upon Us)" (Instrumental) | 0:16 |
| 2. | "Mad Locust Rising" | 4:15 |

Side B
| No. | Title | Length |
|---|---|---|
| 3. | "The Ripper" (Judas Priest cover) | 2:33 |
| 4. | "Let It Be Done / The Day at Guyana" | 4:40 |
| Total length: | | 11:44 |

== Personnel ==
- John Cyriis - Lead Vocals
- Juan Garcia - Guitars
- Bernie Versailles - Guitars
- George Robb - Bass (Uncredited)
- Mike Zaputil - Bass
- Chuck Profus - Drums

Production

- Barry Kobrin - Executive producer
- Steve Sinclair - Executive producer
- Chuck Johnson - Engineering
- Carl Lange - Engineering
- Tom Coyne - Mastering
- Joe Leonard - Production coordination
- Dan McConomy - Producer (additional)
- John Cyriis - Cover concept
- Gerald McLaughlin - Cover art
- Bill Cassel - Photography
- Edward J. Repka - Sleeve design
