= Toxic Grace =

Studio album by Evildead
- Released: May 24, 2024
- Recorded: 2023
- Studio: Music Studios; Phase 66
- Genre: Thrash metal
- Length: 40:40
- Label: SPV/Steamhammer
- Producer: Dave Casey; Rob Hill

Evildead chronology
United $tate$ of Anarchy (2020)	Toxic Grace (2024)

Singles from Toxic Grace
- 1. "Bathe in Fire" Released: July 28, 2023; 2. "Raising Fresh Hell" Released: March 13, 2024; 3. "Subjugated Souls" Released: April 24, 2024

Toxic Grace is the fourth studio album by American thrash metal band Evildead. It was released on May 24, 2024. It is the band's first studio album since 2020's United $tate$ of Anarchy, and their first to have the same lineup as the preceding album. The album's artwork is also Evildead's first not to be designed by Ed Repka; instead, it was designed by Dan Goldsworthy.

== Track listing ==
No.	Title	Length
1.	"F.A.F.O."	3:29
2.	"Reverie"	4:15
3.	"Raising Fresh Hell"	3:26
4.	"Stupid on Parade"	4:18
5.	"Subjugated Souls"	4:26
6.	"Bathe in Fire"	5:26
7.	"Poetic Omen"	4:48
8.	"World ov Rats"	1:55
9.	"Fear Porn"	3:29
10.	"The Death & Resurrection Show 2024" (bonus track for vinyl and digital)	5:04
Total length:		40:40

== Personnel ==
=== Evildead ===
- Juan Garcia – guitars
- Phil Flores – vocals
- Rob Alaniz – drums
- Albert Gonzalez – guitars
- Karlos Medina – bass
