= Bloodbath (album) =

- Cover art by Edward Repka

Studio album by Suicidal Angels
- Released: 27 January 2012
- Recorded: October – November 2011
- Studio: Prophecy and Music Factory Studios, Munich, Germany. Zero Gravity studios, Athens, Greece. Soundlodge studios, Rhauderfehn, Germany.
- Genre: Thrash metal
- Length: 43:01
- Label: NoiseArt
- Producer: Jörg Uken, Suicidal Angels

Suicidal Angels chronology
Dead Again (2009)	Bloodbath (2012)	Divide and Conquer (2014)

Professional ratings
Review scores
Source	Rating
Metalstorm.net	7.2/10

Bloodbath is the fourth studio album by Greek thrash metal band Suicidal Angels, released on 27 January 2012. It is their second album for NoiseArt Records, and their first to enter the German and Austrian official album charts.

The production took place at the Music Factory and Prophecy Studios in Germany, as well as Zero Gravity Studios in Athens. The band worked with Jörg Uken for the mix and master at Soundlodge Studios, based in Rhauderfehn, Germany.

== Track listing ==
All music and arrangements by Suicidal Angels; All lyrics by Melissourgos.

No.	Title	Length
1.	"Bloodbath"	4:41
2.	"Moshing Crew"	3:51
3.	"Chaos (The Curse Is Burning Inside)"	4:35
4.	"Face of God"	3:36
5.	"Morbid Intention to Kill"	6:07
6.	"Summoning of the Dead"	4:21
7.	"Legacy of Pain" (Guest vocals by Karl Willets)	3:32
8.	"Torment Payback" (Guest solo by Bob Katsionis)	2:55
9.	"Skinning the Undead"	3:22
10.	"Bleeding Cries"	6:01
Total length:		43:01

== Personnel ==
Suicidal Angels

- Nick Melissourgos – lead vocals, rhythm guitar, lead guitar, production
- Panos Spanos – rhythm guitar, lead guitar
- Angel Kritsotakis – bass (credited, did not perform)
- Orfeas Tzortzopoulos – drums, production

Production

- Jörg Uken - producer, mixing, mastering
- Christian Schmid – sound engineer
- Andy Siry - Executive producer
- Laura-Maya Toscana and Leo - A&R
- Edward Repka - Cover art
- Tobcat - Layout
