= The Prophecy (Defiance album) =

Studio album by Defiance
- Released: October 19, 2009
- Recorded: June–July 2009
- Genre: Thrash metal
- Length: 40:10
- Label: Candlelight
- Producer: Defiance

Defiance chronology
Beyond Recognition (1992)	The Prophecy (2009)

The Prophecy is the fourth album by American thrash metal band Defiance, released in 2009. Unlike the previous two albums, Void Terra Firma and Beyond Recognition, the album is much more straight forward thrash metal, similar to Product of Society.

== Reception ==
The album had some mediocre reviews by both critics and metal fans alike. For example, about.com responded to this album with,

"There will always be those bands out there who sadly failed to make the impact they deserved. Then again, there will also always be those C-level acts who feel the desperate need to reform and attempt to make good on the promise they never had in the first place. You could count the Bay Area's Defiance—and their crippled 'comeback' The Prophecy—as one of the latter."

Themetalcrypt.com said, "Yet another 'Thrash Revival' album that contains a shitload of groove and yelling but very little actual Thrash."

The album also received favorable reviews for their efforts on what would ultimately be their last. A good example of this warmer reception by critics could be read in the LordsofMetal.com review from late 2009,

"The songs are all fine, from the fast opener 'Prion' to a more sophisticated approach in 'The War Inside' to the typical Bay Area metal-like 'Fuel The Fire' and the instrumental 'Eschaton'. ...Along with the excellent sound this results in yet another world class record."

A similar exert taken from the review by AllMusic shows another positive opinion on the music,

"Guitarist Adams is particularly impressive here, spinning out ferocious solos loaded with dive-bombs and distorted fretboard pyrotechnics, as Kaufmann and Hernandez ...crunch and rumble through the twists and turns of these riff-heavy compositions. The Prophecy doesn't take Defiance beyond the bounds of what they'd already accomplished on their unjustly forgotten earlier albums, but it doesn't tarnish their artistic legacy, either. Thrash veterans/diehards will love hearing these guys again, and retro-thrash youngsters should pay attention to how the older generation does it."

== Track listing ==
No.	Title	Length
1.	"Prion"	3:21
2.	"The Prophecy"	3:46
3.	"Bastard Son"	4:36
4.	"The War Inside"	4:27
5.	"Fuel the Fire"	3:42
6.	"Eschaton"	1:12
7.	"Sloth"	3:24
8.	"Desert Sands"	3:05
9.	"Dissolving Around You"	4:52
10.	"Asthmaphere"	3:44
11.	"Eyes of the Front"	4:08

== Lineup ==
- Steev Esquivel – vocals
- Doug Harrington – guitars
- Jim Adams – guitars
- Mike Kaufmann – bass
- Mark Hernandez – drums
- Glen Alvelais – guitars
