= The Underworld (album) =

Studio album by Evildead
- Released: June 1991
- Recorded: February–March 1991
- Studio: Sound City Studios, Los Angeles, California
- Genre: Thrash metal, crossover thrash
- Length: 42:46
- Label: SPV/Steamhammer
- Producer: Warren "King" Croyle, Juan Garcia, Evildead

Evildead chronology
Annihilation of Civilization (1989)	The Underworld (1991)	United States of Anarchy (2020)

Professional ratings
Review scores
Source	Rating
Rock Hard	9/10 stars

The Underworld is the second studio album by the American thrash metal band Evildead, released in June 1991 on Steamhammer Records. While the album was a mild success, it did not maintain the same popularity as Annihilation of Civilization, likely due to its release coinciding with the advent of the grunge era, which ultimately resulted in a dramatic decline in the popularity of heavy metal in general. This would be their final album with founding vocalist Phil Flores (who left in 1993) and their only featuring guitarist Dan Flores (though he would stay in Evildead until their breakup and played on their 1994 demo EP Terror), bassist Karlos Medina (who also left in 1993, although he would return in 2016) and drummer Doug Clawson (who left not long after the album was released).

Although the band had made several attempts to make a third album during early-to-mid 1990s, and again during their initial reunion from 2008 to 2012, The Underworld would be Evildead's last studio album for nearly three decades, until the release of United States of Anarchy in 2020.

== Track listing ==
All tracks by Evildead, except "He's a Woman/She's a Man" by Rudolf Schenker, Klaus Meine, Herman Rarebell

1. "Intro (Comshell 5)" – 1:34
2. "Global Warming" – 3:14
3. "Branded" – 4:44
4. "Welcome to Kuwait" – 3:44
5. "Critic/Cynic" – 4:03
6. "The Hood" – 3:49
7. "The Underworld" – 4:35
8. "He's a Woman/She's a Man" (Scorpions cover) – 3:20
9. "Process Elimination" – 3:50
10. "Labyrinth of the Mind" - 4:23
11. "Reap What You Sow" - 5:19

== Credits ==
Band members

- Phil Flores – lead and backing vocals
- Juan Garcia – guitars, acoustic guitar, backing vocals, producer, cover concept
- Dan Flores – guitars, talk box, backing vocals
- Karlos Medina - bass, backing vocals

Additional musicians

- Doug 'The Claw' Clawson – drums
- Gene Hoglan - fade solo on "Welcome to Kuwait"
- David Wayne - chorus vocals on "He's a Woman/She's a Man"

Production

- Warren Croyle - producer, engineer, mixing
- Jeff Park - assistant engineer, mixing
- Jack Hayback - assistant engineer
- Jeff Weller - executive producer
- Edward J. Repka - cover art
- Neil Zlozower - photography
