= Unstoppable Force =

Studio album by Agent Steel
- Released: March 1987
- Recorded: March and June 1986
- Studio: Morrisound Studios, Tampa, Florida
- Genre: Speed metal; power metal
- Length: 39:10
- Label: Combat
- Producer: Dan Johnson

Agent Steel chronology
Mad Locust Rising (1985)	Unstoppable Force (1987)	Omega Conspiracy (1999)

Professional ratings
Review scores
Source	Rating
The Collector's Guide to Heavy Metal	7/10
Rock Hard	9.5/10

Unstoppable Force is the second album by American heavy metal band Agent Steel. It was recorded at Morrisound Recording Studios in Tampa, Florida from March – June 1986, and was digitally mastered in July 1986 at Criteria Studios in Miami, Florida. The album was released by Combat Records in March 1987. The 1999 reissue by Century Media Records contains the Mad Locust Rising EP, which some later reissues excludes the cover version of the Judas Priest song "The Ripper". It was the last album before the band split up in 1988, only to reform in 1998 for the release of the 1999 album Omega Conspiracy.

== Track listing ==
Credits adapted from the album liner notes.

Side A
No.	Title	Length
1.	"Unstoppable Force"	3:52
2.	"Never Surrender"	3:52
3.	"Indestructive"	3:30
4.	"Chosen to Stay"	4:46
5.	"Still Searchin'"	4:13

Side B
No.	Title	Length
6.	"Rager"	4:07
7.	"The Day at Guyana" (instrumental)	6:38
8.	"Nothin' Left"	4:23
9.	"Traveler"	3:49
Total length:		39:10

1999 Remastered bonus tracks
No.	Title	Writer(s)	Length
1.	"The Swarm Is upon Us" (instrumental)		0:17
2.	"Mad Locust Rising"		4:20
3.	"The Ripper" (Judas Priest cover)	Glenn Tipton	2:33
4.	"Let It Be Done / The Day at Guyana"		5:03
Total length:			51:23

== Personnel ==
Agent Steel

- John Cyriis – lead vocals
- Juan Garcia – guitars
- Bernie Versailles – guitars
- Michael Zaputil – bass
- Chuck Profus – drums

Additional Musicians

- Ben Meyer, Nasty Ronnie – backing vocals on "Indestructive" and "Rager"

Production

- Dan Johnson – producer
- Jim Morris – engineering
- Tom Morris – engineering, mixing
- Randy Burns – engineering (additional)
- Scott Burns – engineering (pre-production)
- Mike Fuller – mastering
- Steve Sinclair – executive producer
- Rick Frehsee – front cover underwater photography
- Gerald McLaughlin – logo air brushing
- Mark Weinberg – design, typography
- John Cyriis – cover concept
