= Evildead =

American thrash metal band

- Logo by Edward J. Repka

Background information
- Origin: Los Angeles, California, U.S.
- Genres: Thrash metal; crossover thrash
- Years active: 1986–1995; 2008–2012; 2016–present
- Label: Steamhammer
- Spinoff of: Abattoir; Agent Steel
- Members: Juan Garcia; Albert Gonzales; Karlos Medina; Rob Alaniz; Phil Flores
- Past members: Steve Nelson; Mark Caro; Dan Roe; Dan Flores; Mel Sanchez; Doug Clawson; Joe Montelongo; Jon Dette; Eddie Livingston

Evildead is an American thrash metal band formed in Los Angeles in 1986. The band consisted of former members of Agent Steel and Abattoir, including guitarist Juan Garcia, who is their only remaining original member. During their initial nine-year run, Evildead released two studio albums: Annihilation of Civilization (1989) and The Underworld (1991). Evildead suffered from extended inactivity due to lineup changes and problems with making a third album, which resulted in their breakup in 1995. After a reunion from 2008 to 2012, the band reformed in 2016, and has since released two more studio albums: United $tate$ of Anarchy (2020) and Toxic Grace (2024).

== History ==
=== Formation and first two albums (1986–1992) ===
Evildead was formed in 1986 as a side-project of Agent Steel guitarist Juan Garcia and Abattoir bassist Mel Sanchez. They intended to write heavy music with more hardcore and thrash metal elements than their bands at the time. Evildead's style was similar to Testament, Vio-lence, Dark Angel and Sacred Reich. Their lyrics explored political and social themes mixed with humor, and horror and nuclear war topics. The band was named after the Sam Raimi horror film The Evil Dead.

In 1988, the band signed with Steamhammer Records and released Rise Above (a three-track EP featuring the songs "Sloe-Death", "Run Again" and the title track, which is a cover version of the Black Flag song) the following year. They followed up with their debut full-length album, Annihilation of Civilization, released in 1989 to positive reviews. A music video was released for the title track, and it received airplay on MTV's Headbangers Ball.

In the winter of 1991, the band recorded their second album with producer Warren Croyle, The Underworld, released in June of that year. The album was not as successful as Annihilation of Civilization. They released a live album taken from the tour, Live...From The Depths of The Underworld, in 1992, but it was their last release, ostensibly due to what was perceived as grunge displacing 1980s heavy metal and hard rock in North America.

=== Cancelled third album and breakup (1993–2007) ===
Following The Underworld tour, Evildead went on a hiatus. The band began work on a third album in 1993, and wrote several new songs, including "Humano", "Immortal", and "Dia de los Muertos", which appear on the band's 1994 demo tape Terror and would be recorded again for the only Terror album, Hijos de los Cometas (1997). The album was left unfinished and Evildead broke up.

After the split, Karlos Medina and Juan Garcia reformed Agent Steel, and played with ex-Evildead member Danny Flores and Rigo Amezcua in a band called Terror, which released a Spanish-sung album released on BMG in Mexico and is not out of print. Former drummer Joe Montelongo played on the European tour and is on the live release. He went on to play with MX Machine and East Los Angeles-based punk band The Brat.

=== First reunion (2008–2012) ===
In 2008, Evildead announced that they would reunite in the summer of 2009 for shows. They also began rehearsals for the Thrasho De Mayo event that was held in Los Angeles in May 2010. The band also performed at the Way of Darkness Festival in Germany later that year. The line up at the time featured new vocalist, Steve Nelson (Winterthrall, Noctuary), Rob Alaniz (original drummer), Albert Gonzalez (original guitarist), Mel Sanchez (original bassist), and Juan Garcia (original guitarist).

By May 2011, Evildead had been writing new material for their what would be their third studio album. In addition, they posted a new track called "Blasphemy Divine", which was produced by George Pajon and is available for free download. The new album would have been Evildead's first album since 1991's The Underworld and the first new music from the band since writing and demoing songs for an unreleased album in 1993–1994. It would also have been the first Evildead album to feature the return of Albert Gonzalez on guitar, Mel Sánchez on bass and Rob Alaniz on drums since 1989's Annihilation of Civilization as well as Steve Nelson's debut album with the band.

Despite their plans to record a new studio album, it was announced on October 17, 2012, that Evildead had disbanded once again.

=== Second reunion (2016–present) ===
Evildead reunited once again for a one-off show on March 12, 2016, at the Love/Hate Rock Bar in Los Angeles, in celebration of the 50th birthday of drummer Rob Alaniz.

In June 2016, Evildead confirmed that they had permanently reunited, with plans to record new material and play some shows in 2017.

By August 2017, Evildead had been in the studio finishing four tracks for then-upcoming third album, which was being produced by Bill Metoyer. On September 23, 2017, the band premiered their first song in 26 years, "Word of God", on Los Anarchy Radio. Six days later, the band played their first show since reuniting the year before at the Union Club in Los Angeles. On February 11, 2018, Evildead announced on their website that their third album was "coming soon." The album, titled United $tate$ of Anarchy, was released on October 30, 2020.

In January 2023, Evildead announced on their Facebook page that they had been "grinding away writing new material" for their fourth studio album, and had begun pre-production on it by the following month. The then-upcoming album's lead single "Bathe in Fire" was released on July 28, 2023, via streaming services. On March 13, 2024, the album's second single "Raising Fresh Hell" was released, and the band announced their fourth album, Toxic Grace, which was released on May 24.

== Band members ==
=== Current lineup ===
- Juan Garcia – guitars (1986–1995, 2008–2012, 2016–present)
- Phil Flores – lead vocals (1986–1993, 2016–present)
- Rob Alaniz – drums (1986–1990, 2008–2012, 2016–present)
- Albert Gonzalez – guitars (1987–1989, 2010–2012, 2016–present)
- Karlos Medina – bass (1990–1993, 2016–present)

=== Former members ===
- Mel Sánchez – bass (1986–1990, 1993–1995, 2008–2012)
- Mark Caro – guitars (1986–1987, 2008–2009)
- Doug Clawson – drums (1990–1991)
- Dan Flores – guitars (1990–1995)
- Joe Montelongo – drums (1991–1993)
- Jon Dette – drums (1993–1994)
- Steve Nelson – lead vocals (1993–1995, 2010–2012)
- Eddie Livingston – drums (1994–1995; died 2018)
- Chris Maleki – lead vocals (2008–2009)

== Discography ==
=== Studio albums ===
- Annihilation of Civilization (1989)
- The Underworld (1991)
- United $tate$ of Anarchy (2020)
- Toxic Grace (2024)

=== Live albums ===
- Live... From the Depths of the Underworld (1992)

=== EPs ===
- Rise Above (1989)

=== Demos ===
- Terror (1994)
