= Hexen (band) =

American Thrash Metal band from Los Angeles, California

Hexen (Stylized as "HeXeN") was an American melodic thrash metal band from Los Angeles, California. They released 4 demos and 2 full-length albums.

The band formed in 2003 in the north county suburb foothills of Los Angeles, originally consisting of middle school friends Andre Hartoonian, Vahe Yaymayan and Tak Arayan. A year later, Greg Maksudyan was found on the Megadeth forums and now complete with a drummer, the band began forging their sound rehearsing in their garages while playing all sorts of thrash metal covers for fun from bands such as Megadeth, Testament, Death and Coroner. Soon, they realized they were part of the budding early 2000's thrash metal revival, and joined up with the scene playing shows all over Los Angeles and beyond. Playing a surprise cover song somewhere in their set became a staple of their live shows, at times even going beyond metal and doing weird and obscure covers of video game music or classic rock for fun like having played metal versions of the Tetris Theme, The Power Rangers Theme Song, "Burn" from Deep Purple, and a metal version of the Terminator 2 Theme. They had a couple line-up changes while they released a number of independently-produced demos and EPs. Exited Vahe Yaymayan, Tak Arayan and Greg Maksudyan, while Ronny Dorian, James Lopez, and Carlos Cruz climbed on board before they signed a 1-album deal with "Old School Metal Records" and released State of Insurgency in 2008 with cover art by the legendary Ed Repka (Megadeth, Dark Angel, Nuclear Assault, Death, etc). This period of 2007-2010 became the band's peak as they played the most amount of live shows of their entire decade-long run, reaching beyond Los Angeles and playing all along up and down the west coast, putting together little mini-tours that would extend out into Arizona, etc. After playing and most-times selling out all the major venues on the Hollywood Sunset Strip (from the now defunct Knitting Factory and Key Club) to the Troubadour to the Roxy to the world famous Whiskey-A-Go-Go countless times throughout the mid-to-late 2000s (with the likes of Exmortus, Merciless Death, Fueled by Fire, Warbringer, Rattlehead, Desecrate, etc), until they finally embarked on a full nation-wide tour alongside Rattlehead and Mantic Ritual (and Powerglove on a few dates!!) appropriately named "Thrashed and DeTOURed 2010".

After the tour, the band entered the studio again in 2011 to record their sophomore release; 2012's Being and Nothingness. Having fulfilled contract obligations with OSM Records, the band signed another 1-album deal again, this time with Pulverised Records. The Progressive Metal that the members had gotten into in the years since exploring music and metal beyond thrash was apparent on the follow-up. The songs were denser and longer, the subject matter was deeper and more complex, the vocal style changed from thrash to raspy/voiceless. The album's darker direction and tone matched with the new record label's mostly death and black metal roster. Unfortunately, the momentum for the band seemed to begin to wane around this time as Carlos Cruz, having recorded drum tracks, unexpectedly quit the group in 2011 to join Warbringer, right in the middle of the unfinished Being and Nothingness recording sessions. After Ronny Dorian completed tracking all guitars, Ronny had to return to finishing his USC graduate degree, leaving the vocalist/bassist to have to complete the remaining final third of the Being and Nothingness sessions by himself, as it wasn't certain what the status of the band exactly was during this period as he went in to record bass guitar, vocals, programmed keys/extras, and mixing & mastering. The album was completed during that record cold winter of 2010 going into 2011 (where there was snow in parts of Los Angeles it hadn't snowed in a century), and the band were able to once again commission one of their favorite metal cover artists to create the eerie, Twilight Zone-esque, dimension-turning cover art for the band's second full-length: Necrolord (Kristian Wåhlin) of Dissection/Emperor/At The Gates fame. As it was time to hit the stage again, free agent proficient metal drummers being difficult to find, the trio looked within the scene to Dismantle/Merciless Death drummer Gio Loyola they'd previously shared the stage alongside numerous times (as he was free at the time and the bands he was drumming for were on hold). The band played a couple more shows scattered throughout the next year, and not very enthusiastically at that, when the next tribulation came as Ronny also announced he'd be exiting the group and music altogether to focus on family and career. The scene had come and gone, as Andre soon found himself once again the only member. A decade straight of hard thrashing, life sacrifices and lineup changes took its toll and unfortunately, life tends to imitate art as the band eventually went from "being" to "nothingness" on an indefinite hiatus that extends to the present day.

== Discography ==
- Blast Radius (Demo, Self-Produced, 2004)
- Heal a Million...Kill a Million (EP, Self-Produced, 2005)
- From The Cradle...To The Chamber (Demo, Self-Produced, 2007)
- Cinders of Zarathustra (Demo, Self-Produced, 2007)
- State of Insurgency (Full-Length LP, Old School Metal Records, 2008)
- Being and Nothingness (Full-Length LP, Pulverised Records, 2012)

== Band Members ==
=== Current ===
- Andre Hartoonian - Vocals, Bass Guitar (2003-2013)

=== Former ===
- Vahe Yaymayan - Lead/Rhythm Guitar (2003-2006)
- Tak Arayan - Lead/Rhythm Guitar (2003-2005, 2006-2007, 2010-2013)
- Ronny Dorian - Lead/Rhythm Guitar (2005-2013)
- James Lopez - Lead/Rhythm Guitar (2007-2010)
- Greg Maksudyan - Drums (2004-2007)
- Carlos Cruz - Drums, Backing Vocals (2007-2011)
- Gio Loyola - Drums (2011-2013)

== Timeline ==
Timeline of HeXeN Band Members
