= Product of Society =

Studio album by Defiance
- Released: February 6, 1989
- Recorded: 1988
- Genre: Thrash metal
- Length: 36:30
- Label: Roadracer
- Producer: Jeff Waters

Defiance chronology
Product of Society (1989)	Void Terra Firma (1990)

Professional ratings
Review scores
Source	Rating
AllMusic	2/5 stars
Metal Hammer	3/5 stars

Product of Society is the debut album by the American thrash metal band Defiance. It was released in 1989 on Roadracer Records. It was the only album by Defiance to feature Ken Elkington on vocals and had cover art by Ed Repka. This album is much more straightforward technical thrash metal compared to their other albums, which would have a more progressive/complex sound until The Prophecy.

Re-released in 2008 by Metal Mind Productions from Poland as a new digipack edition on golden disc, digitally remastered using 24-Bit process and limited to 2000 numerated copies.

Annihilator guitarist Jeff Waters produced the album. However, the band was very unsatisfied with his production, which sounds very thin and takes away from the thrash metal crunch that gives the music its tonal identity.

== Track listing ==
1. "The Fault" – 3:12
2. "Death Machine" – 3:54
3. "Product of Society" – 3:27
4. "Forgotten" – 3:43
5. "Lock Jaw" – 3:40
6. "Insomnia" – 3:55
7. "Deadly Intentions" – 2:53
8. "Aftermath" (instrumental) – 1:27
9. "Tribulation" (instrumental) – 5:04
10. "Hypothermia" – 5:18

=== Re-release bonus tracks ===
11. "Hypothermia" (demo) – 5:25
12. "Aftermath" (instrumental) (demo) – 1:39
13. "Deadly Intentions" (demo) – 3:16
14. "M.I.A. (Forgotten)" (demo) – 3:58
15. "Product of Society" (demo) – 3:38
16. "Riff Raff" (live) – 4:14
17. "Matt's Drum Solo" (live) – 1:07
18. "Checkmate into Skits/Illusions" (live) – 8:39

== Personnel ==
- Ken Elkington – lead vocals
- Doug Harrington – guitars
- Jim Adams – guitars
- Mike Kaufmann – bass
- Matt Vander Ende – drums

Guests

- Jeff Waters – lead guitar on "Deadly Intentions"
