= Beyond Recognition =

Studio album by Defiance
- Released: March 27, 1992
- Recorded: 1991
- Genre: Thrash metal, progressive metal
- Length: 41:58
- Label: Roadrunner Records
- Producer: Rob Beaton

Defiance chronology
Void Terra Firma (1990)	Beyond Recognition (1992)	The Prophecy (2009)

Professional ratings
Review scores
Source	Rating
AllMusic	3.5/5 stars

Beyond Recognition is the third full-length album (and final until 2009's The Prophecy) by American thrash metal band Defiance, released in 1992 on Roadrunner Records. It was a bit of a departure from the band's previous work. It can be best described as "progressive thrash metal", featuring more complex song structures, odd time signatures, numerous key and tempo changes, technical riffs and drumming, and even clean sections that often evoked jazz fusion. This newer, more distinctive style earned the band their biggest critical success to date, and many fans hail it as their finest work.

Despite this, the album did not sell as well as their previous works due to a shifting musical landscape and as a result, poor advertisement for the album. It has been out of print for many years, though many thrash fans consider it to be a lost gem of the genre.

During the recording of Beyond Recognition, vocalist Steev Esquivel temporarily left the band due to lack of focus due to drug addiction. He came back later when the band was not satisfied with their replacement vocalist. All of the tracks on the album still had Esquivel on lead vocals.

Former Heathen vocalist Dave White makes a guest appearance on "Inside looking Out", doing a vocal harmony with Esquivel during the chorus line. Ed Repka also did the cover art.

== Track listing ==
1. Killing Floor (03:45)
2. Step Back (05:01)
3. Perfect Nothing (05:38)
4. No Compromise (04:14)
5. Dead Silence (04:10)
6. Inside Looking Out (05:19)
7. The Chosen (04:16)
8. Powertrip (04:22)
9. Promised Afterlife (4:50)
10. Beyond Recognition (Unreleased 1991) (Bonus track) (1:20)

== Lineup ==
- Steev Esquivel – lead vocals
- Doug Harrington – guitars
- Jim Adams – guitars
- Mike Kaufmann – bass
- Matt Vander Ende – drums
- Dave White – backing vocals on "Inside Looking Out"
