= Sanctify the Darkness =

- Cover art by Kristian Wahlin

Studio album by Suicidal Angels
- Released: 20 November 2009
- Recorded: March 2009, Prophecy and Music Factory Studios
- Studio: Prophecy and Music Factory Studios, Munich, Germany
- Genre: Thrash metal
- Length: 38:13
- Label: Nuclear Blast
- Producer: R.D Liapakis, Suicidal Angels

Suicidal Angels chronology
Eternal Domination (2007)	Sanctify the Darkness (2009)	Dead Again (2010)

Professional ratings
Review scores
Source	Rating
AllMusic	4/5 stars
Sea of Tranquility	3.5/5 stars

Sanctify the Darkness is the second full-length studio album by Greek thrash metal band Suicidal Angels. It is the first time that the band flies over outside the borders of Greece and more specifically to Munich, to record an album, right from the very beginning until the last detail of the master. Also it is the first time the band works with a producer, R.D Liapakis. Recording was done at the Prophecy and Music Factory Studios, while mixing and mastering took place at Maranis studios in Backnang, Germany. The release of the album took place in November 2009, through the major label Nuclear Blast, after the band won over 1200 bands at the RTN awards.

== Track listing ==
All music and arrangements by Nick and Orfeas; all lyrics by Nick Melissourgos and Themis Katsimichas.

No.	Title	Length
1.	"Bloodthirsty"	04:48
2.	"The Pestilence of Saints"	03:50
3.	"Inquisition"	04:38
4.	"Apokathilosis"	03:34
5.	"...Lies"	02:28
6.	"No More than Illusion"	03:38
7.	"Atheist"	03:40
8.	"Beyond the Laws of Church"	02:41
9.	"Mourning of the Cursed"	01:55
10.	"Dark Abyss (Your Fate Is Colored Black)"	03:23
11.	"Child Molester"	03:38
Total length:		38:13

== Personnel ==
Suicidal Angels

- Nick Melissourgos – lead vocals, rhythm guitar, lead guitar, production
- Themis Katsimichas – rhythm guitar, lead guitar (Katsimichas left the band a few months prior to the release of the album)
- Panos Spanos – lead guitar on Apokathilosis
- Angel Kritsotakis – bass (credited, did not perform)
- Orfeas Tzortzopoulos – drums, production

Production

- Christian Schmid – sound engineer
- Maranis studios – mixing, mastering
- R.D. Liapakis - producer
- Kristian Wahlin - Cover art
- Jaap Wagemaker - A&R
