= United States of Anarchy =

Studio album by Evildead
- Released: October 30, 2020
- Recorded: 2017–2020
- Genre: Thrash metal
- Length: 34:32
- Label: SPV/Steamhammer
- Producer: Bill Metoyer

Evildead chronology
The Underworld (1991)	United States of Anarchy (2020)	Toxic Grace (2024)

United States of Anarchy (stylized as United $tate$ of Anarchy) is the third studio album by the American thrash metal band Evildead, released on October 30, 2020. It is the band's first studio album since The Underworld (1991), marking the longest gap between two studio albums in the band's career. Nearly five years in the making, the album was produced by Bill Metoyer, and also sees four-fifths of the Annihilation of Civilization lineup reunited, with Karlos Medina replacing original bassist Mel Sanchez. Just like their previous two albums, the artwork for United States of Anarchy was designed by Ed Repka.

== Background ==
After a break following the accompanying tour for The Underworld, Evildead headed back into the studio in 1993 to work on their third album, and recorded several demos including the songs "Humano", "Immortal" and "Dia de los Muertos"; these songs also appeared on the band's 1994 demo tape Terror. However, internal disputes and problems while making the follow-up to The Underworld resulted in Evildead's first break up in 1995. The band first reformed in 2008 to play a handful of shows. Work on the third album had restarted by 2011, and the band released their first song in 20 years, "Blasphemy Divine", that May as a free download. However, Evildead would disband once again in October 2012, due to "personal differences", and announced that the songs written for the band's third album would surface on the debut by Faeost, a project featuring former members of Evildead.

Evildead reunited for the second time in March 2016 for what was initially intended to be a one-off show, at the Love/Hate Rock Bar in Los Angeles, in celebration of the 50th birthday of drummer Rob Alaniz. The band confirmed on Facebook several months later that they were active once again and working on their first studio album in over two decades, with plans to tour behind it in 2017. Evildead began recording the album in the summer of 2017, with Bill Metoyer handling the production, and premiered their first song in 26 years, "Word of God", that September on Los Anarchy Radio.

On February 11, 2018, Evildead announced on their Facebook page that new music was "coming soon", and it was later reported that their third album would be released in the summer; however, the album never appeared and no reason was given for the delay. The band re-signed with SPV/Steamhammer in 2019, and after numerous delays, Evildead announced on August 27, 2020, that their third album United States of Anarchy would be released on October 30.

== Track listing ==
United States of Anarchy track listing
No.	Title	Length
1.	"The Descending"	3:12
2.	"Word of God"	3:04
3.	"Napoleon Complex"	3:08
4.	"Greenhouse"	3:58
5.	"Without a Cause"	3:05
6.	"No Difference"	4:20
7.	"Blasphemy Divine"	2:57
8.	"A.O.P. / War Dance"	5:21
9.	"Seed of Doubt"	5:27
Total length:		34:32

LP/digital bonus track
No.	Title	Length
10.	"Planet Claire 2020" (cover of The B-52's)	4:03
Total length:		38:35

== Personnel ==
- Phil Flores – vocals
- Juan Garcia – guitars
- Albert Gonzalez – guitars
- Karlos Medina – bass
- Rob Alaniz – drums
