= Skeptics Apocalypse =

Studio album by Agent Steel
- Released: June 1985
- Recorded: December 1984–February 1985
- Studio: Indigo Ranch Studios (Malibu, California)
- Genre: Speed metal; thrash metal; power metal
- Length: 30:39
- Label: Combat
- Producer: Jay Jones

Agent Steel chronology
Skeptics Apocalypse (1985)	Mad Locust Rising (1985)

Professional ratings
Review scores
Source	Rating
AllMusic	4.5/5 stars
Collector's Guide to Heavy Metal	6/10
Rock Hard	9.5/10

Skeptics Apocalypse is the debut album by American heavy metal band Agent Steel. It was recorded in Los Angeles, California and mastered at Frankort Wayne Studios in Miami, Florida by Tom Coyne from December 1984 to February 1985. The album was released by Combat Records in June 1985 and reissued in 1998 by Century Media Records.

The bonus tracks on the 1998 reissue contains an updated version of "(The Calling)" titled "Calling 98 for Skeptics" and the never before released song "The Unexpected" in live format, both of which are of unknown origin. The latter can be seen and heard on the Mad Locust Rising home video. A second remastered version, released in 2008, contains the two songs, plus a cover version of the Judas Priest song "The Ripper", which was originally featured on the Mad Locust Rising EP.

"144,000 Gone" and "Taken by Force" are re-recordings of songs John Cyriis had previously cut as demos with his pre-Agent Steel band Sceptre in 1983. The Sceptre version of "Taken by Force" appears on Metal Massacre IV.

== Track listing ==
Side A
No.	Title	Length
1.	"(The Calling)" (Instrumental)	0:47
2.	"Agents of Steel"	3:04
3.	"Taken by Force"	2:30
4.	"Evil Eye / Evil Minds"	3:04
5.	"Bleed for the Godz"	3:28

Side B
No.	Title	Length
6.	"Children of the Sun"	4:53
7.	"144,000 Gone"	4:32
8.	"Guilty as Charged"	4:58
9.	"Back to Reign"	3:23
Total length:		30:39

1998 remastered edition bonus tracks
No.	Title	Length
1.	"Calling 98 for Skeptics"	0:57
2.	"The Unexpected" (live)	5:06
Total length:		36:42

2008 remastered edition bonus tracks
No.	Title	Writer(s)	Length
1.	"Calling 98 for Skeptics"		0:57
2.	"The Unexpected" (live)		5:06
3.	"The Ripper" (Judas Priest cover)	Glenn Tipton	2:33
Total length:			39:27

== Personnel ==
- John Cyriis – vocals
- Juan Garcia – guitars
- Kurt Colfelt – guitars
- George Robb – bass
- Chuck Profus – drums

Production

- Jay Jones – producer
- Dean "Goatie" Davis – engineering
- Tom Coyne – mastering
- Maarten de Boer – lacquer cut
- Vickie Miellie, Teresa Trebotic – photography
- Ron Breitag – logo design
