= Holy Terror (band) =

- Origin: North Hills, California, U.S.
- Genres: Thrash metal, speed metal
- Years active: 1985–1989
- Labels: Music for Nations, Roadracer Records, Blackend Records, Dissonance Productions

Holy Terror was an American thrash/speed metal band from North Hills, California, active between 1985 and 1989. The group earned a cult following thanks to its aggressive sound, socially conscious lyrical themes, and underground influence during the late‑1980s metal boom.

== History ==
Guitarist Kurt Kilfelt (also Kurt Colfelt) formed the band in 1985 after leaving Agent Steel. He recruited ex-Dark Angel drummer Jack Schwarz, bassist Floyd Flanary, guitarist Mike Alvord, and later vocalist Keith Deen.

They self-released a four-track demo, drawing label interest and eventually signing to UK's Music for Nations under its Under One Flag imprint. Schwarz reportedly signed the deal without full band consent and subsequently left, replaced by Joe Mitchell.

Holy Terror released their debut album, Terror and Submission, in 1987. Critics praised it as "a punishing thrash metal unit" with lyrical depth and melodic aggression—an approach that balanced speed with structure.

Their second and final album, Mind Wars (1988), was recorded in just 17 days. It was lauded for its "pure, aggressive, yet melodic energy that even now, decades later, is almost impossible to ignore."

The band toured Europe and North America with acts like D.R.I., Exodus, and Kreator. However, drug abuse, managerial turmoil during their second European tour, and internal strife ultimately led to their disbandment in 1989.

== Members ==
=== Final line-up ===
- Aaron Redbird – vocals
- Kurt Kilfelt – guitar
- Matt Fox – guitar
- Jeff Matz – bass
- Joe Mitchell – drums

=== Former members ===
- Keith Deen – vocals (d.2012)
- Mike Alvord – guitar
- Floyd Flanary – bass
- Jack Schwarz – drums

== Discography ==
=== Studio albums ===
- Terror and Submission (1987, Music for Nations)
- Mind Wars (1988, Music for Nations)

=== Compilations & box sets ===
- El Revengo (2006, Blackend Records) – demos, rare & live tracks
- Total Terror (2017, Dissonance Productions) – 5‑CD box set with full discography and live DVD

== Legacy ==
Holy Terror went largely overlooked in their time, but have since gained cult recognition within thrash fandom. Critics and fans consistently cite Mind Wars for its complexity and Keith Deen's intense vocal performance.

One critic called Terror and Submission "a punishing thrash metal unit … Holy Terror is a stunning thrash metal unit that cranked out an absolute must listen for fans of the genre."
