= John Cyriis =

Brazilian-born heavy metal singer

- Also known as: John Camps; John Syriis; Father Damien; Max Kobol; John Havlock
- Born: Santos, São Paulo, São Paulo, Brazil
- Genres: Heavy metal; thrash metal
- Occupations: Singer, guitarist
- Years active: ~1983–present
- Member of: Agent Steel
- Formerly of: Abbatoir, Megadeth

John Cyriis is an American singer and former guitarist, best known as the vocalist for thrash metal band Agent Steel. He was also the lead singer in other bands, most notably Abbatoir and Megadeth, and played guitar in Sceptre.

== Early life ==
Cyriis was born in Santos, São Paulo, Brazil and moved to the United States at a young age.

== Career ==
He joined Sceptre as a guitar player, using the pseudonym John Camps.

Cyriis joined Abbatoir in 1983, using the stage name John Syriis. One of the band's songs, "Taken by Force", was featured on the Metal Massacre IV compilation.

Cyriis was the lead singer of Megadeth in late 1983; the lineup at the time included guitarist Dave Mustaine, bassist David Ellefson and drummer Dijon Carruthers. He rehearsed with the band, learned the setlist and wrote lyrics to a Megadeth song, titled "Into the Abyss", which he described as being influenced by Mercyful Fate. Mustaine and Ellefson decided to let Cyriis go. Cyriis mentioned in an interview with Crystal Logic that he was "relieved" at leaving the band, in part because he had hoped to be part of a band with two guitars. He posited in an interview that if he had broadened his lyrics outside of the alien concept, he could have stayed with the band longer.

The band Agent Steel was formed in 1984.

Cyriis formed Pontius Prophet in 1988 and used the pseudonym Father Damien. Two years later, he contributed vocals to the band Black Reign under the pseudonym Max Kobol.

Cyriis used the pseudonym Max Havlock by the early 2000s.

Bruce Hall, who was the singer in Agent Steel, left the band in April 2010. Cyriis returned to the band the next month, playing his first return gig at Club Citta, Kawasaki, Japan in September 2010. The band canceled their planned April appearance in February at the Keep It True festival. The band (with the exception of Cyriis) performed with Rick Mythiasin of Steel Prophet in April 2011. The reunion did not last, with Cyriis leaving the band seven months later.

In 2019, Cyriis announced that he had reformed Agent Steel. It was announced in January that the band would play the Keep It True festival in Lauda-Königshofen, Germany in late April, as well as the Metalheadz Open Air festival in June in Oberndorf am Lech, Germany. Fans were dissatisfied with a shortened set, with the band playing for 30 minutes due to traffic problems, rather than the anticipated hour.

== Singing style ==
Cyriis is known for his "high-pitched vocals."

== Discography ==
=== With Abbatoir ===
- Metal Massacre IV (1983)

=== With Sceptre ===
- Sceptre (1983)

=== With Agent Steel ===
- 144,000 Gone (1984)
- Second Demo (1984)
- Skeptics Apocalypse (1985)
- Mad Locust Rising (1985)
- Metal Hammer Roadshow 1 (1986)
- Unstoppable Force (1987)
- No Other Godz Before Me (2021)
- Mad Locust Rising - Live at Hammersmith Odeon 1987 (2024)
