= Agent Steel =

American speed metal band

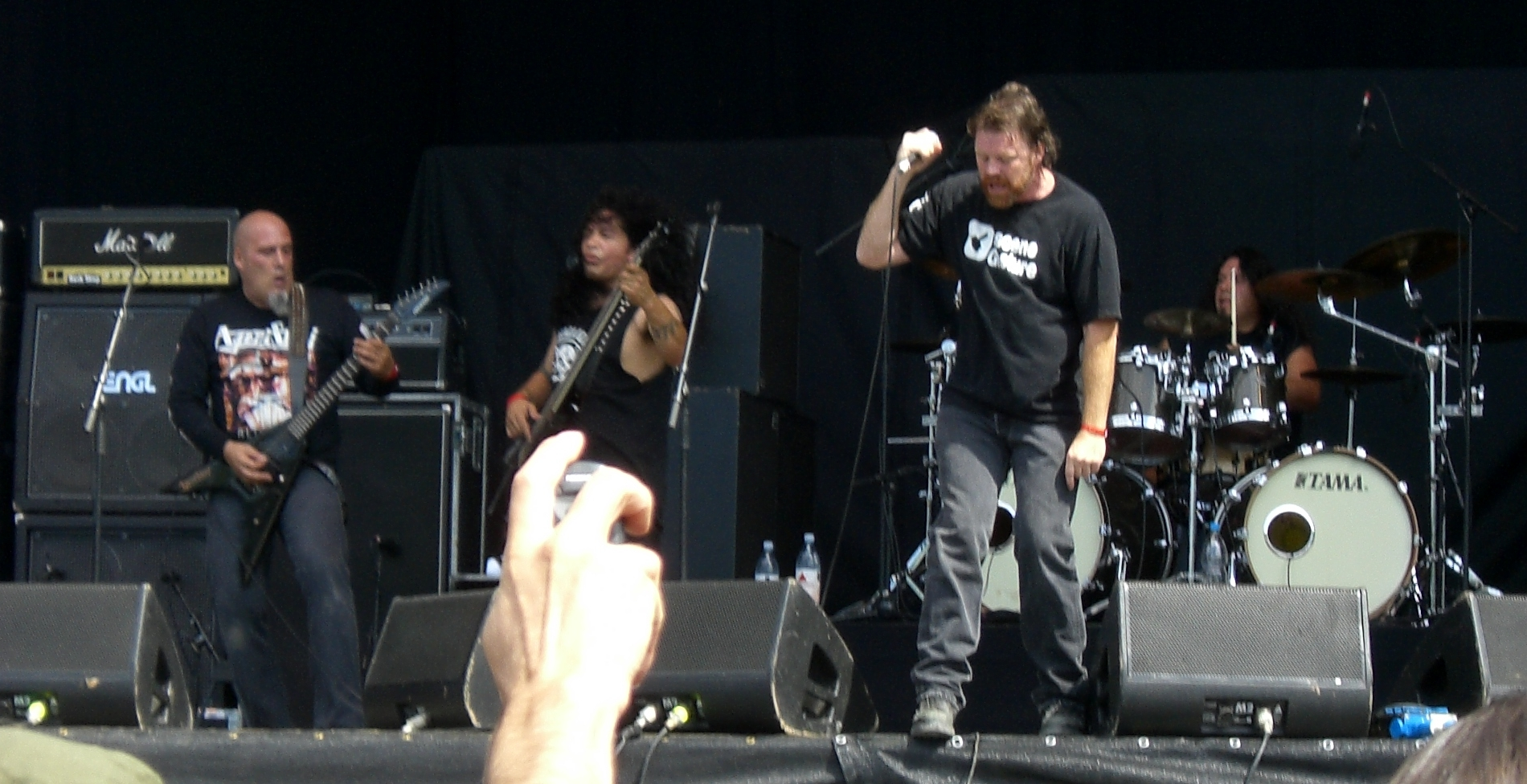
- Agent Steel performing at Bang Your Head 2008, with previous singer Bruce Hall

Background information
- Origin: Los Angeles, California, U.S.
- Genres: Speed metal; power metal; thrash metal
- Years active: 1984–1988; 1998–2011; 2018–present
- Labels: Dissonance Productions; Combat; Music for Nations; Metal Hammer; Candlelight; Scarlet; Mascot
- Spinoffs: Evildead; Holy Terror
- Spinoff of: Abattoir
- Members: Johnny Cyriis; Junior Wendland; Johnny Moraes; Alexandre Vilegas; Nikolay Atanasov
- Past members: Mark Marshal; John Gott; Kurt Colfelt; Bill Simmons; Chuck Profus; George Robb; Juan Garcia; Bernie Versailles; Michael Zaputil; Silvio Golfetti; Brian "Beast" East; Bruce Hall; Karlos Medina; Rigo Amezcua; Robert Cardenas; Kyle Abbott; Rasmus Kjær; Igor Lopes; Joe McGuigan; Vinicius Carvalho; Shuichi Oni; Ricardo França; Marcus Dotta; Andre Mellado
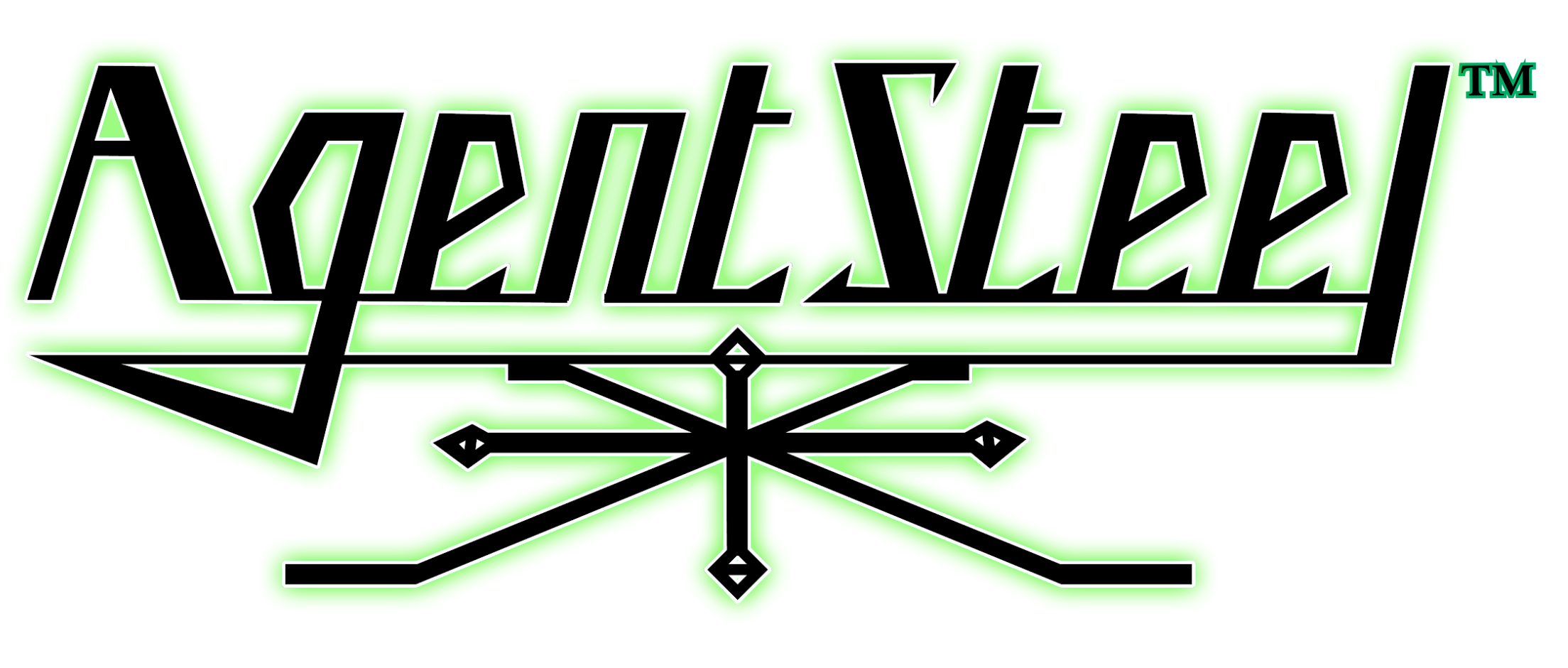

Agent Steel is an American speed metal band from Los Angeles, formed in 1984 by vocalist John Cyriis with drummer Chuck Profus. The band released two full-length albums and one EP before disbanding in 1988. They have since reformed twice. They are most notable for Cyriis' high-pitched vocals, melodic riffs, and fast tempos mixed in with interest in UFOs.

Agent Steel reformed in 1998 (without Cyriis, although he would return to the band in 2010, only to leave again in 2011) and released three more full-length albums before going on hiatus in 2011. The band reformed again in 2018, this time with Cyriis returning as the vocalist and without any previous members (including longtime guitarist Juan Garcia, who is now in Evildead and Body Count); under this new lineup, Agent Steel released their first studio album in 14 years (and also their first in 34 years to feature Cyriis), No Other Godz Before Me, in 2021.

== History ==
=== Early years and split (1984–1988) ===
Agent Steel was formed by John Cyriis shortly after his firing from Megadeth in 1984, as, according to Cyriis, guitarist and now lead vocalist Dave Mustaine was against the idea of focusing on the "entire Alien concept."

The first legal registration of the name Agent Steel was registered by Cyriis on July 23, 1984, as a DBA at the Los Angeles County Clerk's Office. Beforehand, however, Agent Steel was initially named Sanctuary.

Agent Steel's first incarnation recorded a demo in the studio, titled "144,000 Gone" in the summer of 1984. "144,000 Gone" was written by Cyriis when he was a guitarist in his previous band Sceptre, a metal band formed in Los Angeles in 1983 with Tony and Phil Sardo. The Sardo brothers left soon afterwards to form thrash metal band Sardo with Trash Wallow drummer Stephen Cook. The lineup then consisted of drummer Chuck Profus, guitarists Bill Simmons and Mark Marshal, and bassist George Robb. Another member named John Gott joined, but left shortly afterwards. New guitarists Juan Garcia and Kurt Colfelt joined the band. From December 1984 to February 1985, they recorded their debut album Skeptics Apocalypse, which was released in June 1985 by Combat Records. The most popular song on Skeptics Apocalypse, "Agents of Steel", has over half a million listens on YouTube as of 2020. Shortly after the band's debut album was released, a falling-out with John Cyriis led to the departure of Colfelt. Colfelt was then replaced with new guitarist Bernie Versailles.

In October 1985, the band recorded an EP titled Mad Locust Rising, which was released in January 1986. Bassist George Robb was fired after the recordings and was replaced by Letchen Grey bassist Michael Zaputil shortly after.

In March 1986, Agent Steel entered the studio once again to record their second album Unstoppable Force. The recordings came to a halt when the band went to perform at the Aardschok Dag Festival in Eindhoven in April 1986. In May 1986, they toured Europe with Anthrax and Overkill before returning to the studio to finish the recordings in June 1986. The album's release was then delayed due to complications with the cover artwork. An early 1987 release was then planned. In November 1986, Capitol Records expressed interest in signing the band, who had recently signed Megadeth. The band's management demanded more money, to which the label agreed, with a stipulation that the band would have to wait until the new year to release the album, and with the acquisition of new department budgets. Cyriis and Profus moved to Florida for various reasons, while the rest of the members remained in California.

In January 1987, Capitol Records withdrew from the offer due being unable to secure required industry-standard performance and surety bonds, due to the seemingly unreliable nature of Cyriis and the band's abrupt lineup changes. Unstoppable Force was released in March 1987 by Combat Records instead. Cyriis and Profus were then joined by guitarists James Murphy and Jay Weslord, and bassist Richard Bateman. The new lineup performed shows in Europe with Nuclear Assault in June 1987, one of them being at the Hammersmith Apollo, in which their final performance can be seen on the 1989 home video Mad Locust Rising.

In 1988, the band disbanded, as their record label, Combat Records, put them on suspension. This suspension lasted for as long as the band's contract with the label lasted—about three years or so.

In an interview, Cyriis stated his version as to why Agent Steel was disbanded in 1988: "....Agent Steel was buried alive by Combat Records, who put the band on suspension for no legitimate, justifiable reason. Why they did so, remains a mystery to this very day..."

=== First reformation (1998–2009) ===
In 1998, guitarists Juan Garcia and Bernie Versailles reformed Agent Steel without Cyriis' consent, featuring returning members Chuck Profus and Michael Zaputil, and new vocalist Bruce Hall. Zaputil left the band shortly after and new bassist Karlos Medina would replace him. The third album, Omega Conspiracy, was released on October 25, 1999. In 2001, the band changed their name to Order of the Illuminati due to legal pressure from Cyriis. Profus left the band in 2002 and was replaced with new drummer Rigo Amezcua. They would return to the Agent Steel name and would record their fourth album, Order of the Illuminati, under the same name which they performed at the time. It was released on June 10, 2003. In 2004, the band performed at the Dynamo Open Air festival, which is featured as a DVD, released on March 21, 2005, and also touring Europe with the band After All in the spring of 2005. On August 31, 2007, the fifth album, Alienigma, was released.

=== Reunion with John Cyriis and second hiatus (2010–2011) ===
On April 24, 2010, vocalist Bruce Hall announced his departure. On May 3, 2010, Agent Steel announced that they would reunite with John Cyriis. They performed at the Thrash Domination event on September 18 and 19 in Kawasaki, and was also rehearsing their classic material as well as working on new songs for a future album release, for which one of the tracks that Cyriis would write lyrics had a working title of "Behold...The Great Race".

On January 24, 2011, Agent Steel announced that Cyriis would not perform with the band on the 70000 Tons of Metal cruise due to "unfortunate events". Helstar vocalist James Rivera and Steel Prophet vocalist Rick Mythiasin would fill in for him, in which they would perform as Masters of Metal. On February 24, 2011, the band would cancel their appearance at the Keep It True festival in April. The organizers of the event explained that they were "facing totally new demands from one part of the band, that we, as a still small and dedicated festival, could not meet and really also do not want to meet. This, plus the troubles within the band itself, led to the final cancellation of Agent Steel with John Cyriis." Guitarist Juan Garcia denied any rumors that Rick Mythiasin was the band's new vocalist, but was only a temporary fill-in for Cyriis. Due to the circumstances surrounding the band, the organizers invited Agent Steel to still perform, but under a different name, and that Mythiasin would be invited to perform onstage with them. Cyriis later returned to the band and performed at the Sweden Rock Festival, which was claimed to be his final performance with the band, but was refuted by Cyriis during the event. Despite his apparent return, he would perform with his band S.E.T.I. at the Headbangers Open Air festival in July.

Meanwhile, the remaining members of Agent Steel have continued to perform as Masters of Metal, releasing their debut album From Worlds Beyond on September 18, 2015.

=== Second reformation (2018–present) ===
In November 2018, John Cyriis returned once more to reform Agent Steel, fronting a lineup of new members. He announced that the band would perform at the Keep It True festival in April 2019, and release their first studio album in twelve years, originally titled 8 Lights Protocol, with a tentative September 2019 release. At the time of the event, the band performed for only 30 minutes instead of the originally scheduled one-hour set. German-based magazine Underground Empire explained in an Instagram post that the band started later "because of a traffic jam", which then caused complaints from fans. The band posted a photo of the show the next day with the caption, "Germany truly was a phenomenon, but only the very beginning..." The new members were announced as guitarist Nikolay Atanasov, original guitarist Bill Simmons, bassist Joe McGuigan and drummer Dennis Kruse Strømberg. They signed to Dissonance Productions and changed the title of their seventh studio album to No Mercy from the Godz, which was originally due for release on October 18, 2019, with the band expected to launch a "tour in the fall of 2019 – and throughout 2020." In July 2019, the band announced that they changed the title of the album again to No Others Godz Before Me. In December 2019, Agent Steel released two visualizer videos for demo versions of two new songs titled "Separation of Church and Fate" and "Way of the Mechanism".

After a two-year delay, No Other Godz Before Me was released on March 19, 2021, to mostly mixed to negative reviews.

In December 2021, Agent Steel released a new song "Terminator of Souls" and announced plans to tour in 2022. They also were planning to release a new album in 2023; however, there was no sign of the album, nor any updates from the band. As of 2024, it remains unreleased.

Agent Steel's first live album, Mad Locust Rising - Live at Hammersmith Odeon 1987, was released on September 27, 2024.

On June 4, 2025, original Agent Steel drummer Chuck Profus died at the age of 61.

The band had further lineup changes in 2025, with Nikolay Atanasov returning as guitarist, as well as bassist Alexandre Vilegas and drummer Junior Wendland joining the band.

== Members ==
Current members

- John Cyriis — vocals (1984–1988, 2010–2011, 2019–present)
- Johnny Moraes — guitar (2024–present)
- Junior Wendland — drums (2025–present)
- Alexandre Vilegas — bass (2025–present)
- Nikolay Atanasov — guitar (2019–2022, 2023, 2025-present)

Former members

- Chuck Profus — drums (1984–1988, 1998–2001; died 2025)
- George "Doom" Robb — bass (1984–1986, 2024–2025)
- Brad Phillips — guitar (1984)
- Mark Marshall — guitar (1984)
- Bill Simmons — guitar (1984, 2019)
- Juan Garcia — guitar, backing vocals (1984–1987, 1998–2011)
- Kurt Colfelt — guitar (1984–1985)
- Bernie Versailles — guitar, backing vocals (1985–1987, 1998–2011)
- Mike Zaputil — bass (1986–1987, 1998–1999)
- Jay Weslord — guitar (1987–1988)
- James Murphy — guitar (1987–1988)
- Richard Bateman — bass (1987–1988; died 2018)
- Bruce Hall — lead vocals (1998–2010)
- Karlos Medina — bass, backing vocals (1998–2007)
- Rigo Amezcua — drums (2001–2011)
- Robert Cardenas — bass, backing vocals (2007–2011)
- Joe McGuigan — bass (2019–2020)
- Kyle Abbott — drums (2019)
- Igor Lopes — guitar (2019)
- Damian Giron — guitar (2019)
- Leonardo Da Rocha — guitar (2019)
- Dennis Kruse Strømberg — drums (2019–2020)
- Vinicius Carvalho — guitar (2020–2023)
- Rasmus Kjær — drums (2020–2023)
- Eddie Webb — bass (2020)
- Shuichi Oni — bass (2020–2023)
- Justin Zych — guitar (2023)
- Kelly Conlon — bass (2023)
- Lamar Little — drums (2023)
- Ricardo França — guitar (2024–2025)
- Marcus Dotta — drums (2024–2025)
- Andre Mellado — bass (2025)

== Discography ==
Studio albums

- Skeptics Apocalypse (1985)
- Unstoppable Force (1987)
- Omega Conspiracy (1999)
- Order of the Illuminati (2003)
- Alienigma (2007)
- No Other Godz Before Me (2021)

Live albums

- Mad Locust Rising - Live at Hammersmith Odeon 1987 (2024)

EPs

- Mad Locust Rising (1986)

Demos

- 144,000 Gone (1984)
- Second Demo (1984)
- Agents of Steel (1998)
- Agents of Steel 1998 demo (1998)
- Deny the Poison (1999)

Singles

- Forever Black (2000)
- Earth Under Lucifer (2003)
- The Devil's Greatest Trick (2020)

Videography

- Metal Hammer Roadshow 1 (1986)
- Mad Locust Rising (1989)
- Live @ Dynamo Open Air (2005)
- Mad Locust Rising (DVD) (2007)
