= Abattoir (band) =

American speed metal band

Background information
- Origin: Los Angeles, California, U.S.
- Genres: Speed metal; power metal
- Years active: 1982–1988; 1998–2005; 2018–2019
- Label: Combat Records
- Spinoffs: Agent Steel; Evildead
- Members: Rob Alainz; Mark Carro; Dan Oliverio; Steve Gaines; Eric Bryan
- Past members: Juan Garcia; Mel Sanchez; Kevin Macshane; Robert Wayne; Danny Anaya; John Cyriis

Abattoir was an American speed metal band founded in 1982 which went through a number of lineup changes.

Their first recording appearance was on Metal Massacre IV in 1983, during a time when their vocalist was John Cyriis, who later went to found Agent Steel. Juan Garcia, and Steve Gaines went on to be involved in other metal bands, including Evildead and Tactics. Future L.A. Guns founder Michael Jagosz was also briefly a vocalist for Abattoir during the early days.

On February 17 and 19, 1984, Abattoir was the opening act of the first two Megadeth shows. Cyriis was a former member of Megadeth.

== Discography ==
- Vicious Attack (1985)
- The Only Safe Place (1986)
- No Sleep 'til Kalamazoo - Live! (live, 2001)

== Performances ==
Performances
Date	Venue	City	Played With	Flyer
August 5, 1983	Shamus O'Briens	El Monte, CA	Prisoner, Medusa, Citizen Kane, Stormer, Tramp	
August 26, 1983	The Troubadour	Los Angeles, CA	N/A	1
October 8, 1983	The Country Club	Reseda, CA	W.A.S.P., Malice	1 2
October 15, 1983	Radio City	Anaheim, CA	Bitch	1
October 22, 1983	The Troubadour	Los Angeles, CA	Savage Grace, M80	1 2
November 4, 1983	The Country Club	Reseda, CA	Metallica, Armored Saint	1 2 3 4
December 21, 1983	The Country Club	Reseda, CA	Girlschool	1
February 17, 1984	Ruthie's Inn	Berkeley, CA	Opening for Megadeth	
February 19, 1984	The Stone	San Francisco, CA	Opening for Megadeth	
