= Suicidal Angels =

Greek thrash metal band

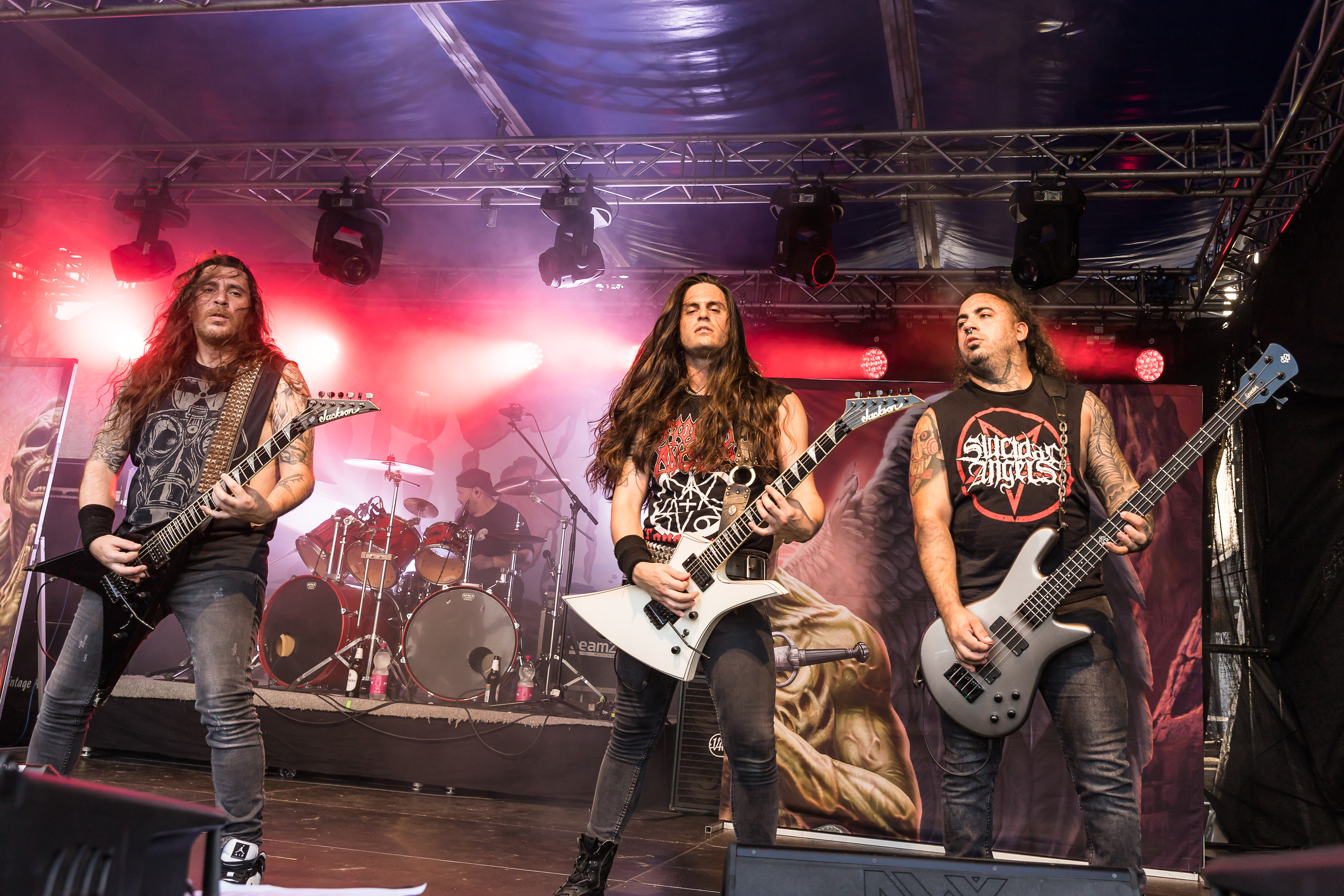
- Suicidal Angels at Rock & Metal Day'z 2026 at Oschersleben, Germany

Background information
- Origin: Athens, Greece
- Genre: Thrash metal
- Years active: 2001–present
- Labels: OSM, Nuclear Blast, NoiseArt
- Members: Nick Melissourgos; Orfeas Tzortzopoulos; Angelos Lelikakis; Stamatis Syrakos
- Past members: Gus Drax; Themis Katsimihas; Panos Spanos; Chris Tsitsis; Christina Gemidopoulou; Sotiris Skarpalezos; Angelos Kritsotakis
- Website: suicidalangels.net

Suicidal Angels are a Greek thrash metal band formed in 2001 in Athens by guitarist/vocalist and main songwriter Nick Melissourgos, who is the only constant member. The band have released eight studio albums and gone through several line-up changes.

== History ==
=== Early years (2001–2006) ===
The band's first demo, United by Hate, was released in 2002. Two years and two self-released demos later, they recorded their first extended play, Bloodthirsty Humanity, followed, in 2006, by the EP Armies of Hell, distributed by Greek label Live Records. The lineup for that release consisted of Nick Melissourgos on guitar and vocals, Themis Katsimichas on guitar, Orfeas Tzortzopoulos on drums, and Christine Gemidopoulou on bass.

=== Eternal Domination and Sanctify the Darkness (2007–2009) ===
Soon after, Gemidopoulou left and was replaced with Sotiris Skarpalezos on bass. The band recorded its first full-length album, Eternal Domination, and released it in July 2007 on California-based OSM Records. That year, after gaining experience in the local club circuit and a few shows abroad, Suicidal Angels joined Rotting Christ's Theogonia Balkans Tour. In 2007 and 2008, they toured Europe with Onslaught and Massacre. Prior to releasing Eternal Domination, in May 2007, Suicidal Angels supported Kreator in Athens. Mille Petrozza praised their live performance and supported them until their breakthrough.

In early 2009, Sotiris Skarpalezos left the band and was replaced with Angel Kritsotakis on bass. In March 2009, the band entered "Music Factory & Prophecy Studios" in Germany to record its second studio album, Sanctify the Darkness. Soon after recording the album, guitarist Themis Katsimichas left the band to pursue a medical career, and was replaced with Panos Spanos. Later that year, the band won the Rock The Nation and Nuclear Blast band contest over 1,200 bands from Europe.

Following Sanctify the Darkness in November 2009 by Nuclear Blast, the group toured with Kataklysm and Overkill, and performed at many European festivals, including Wacken Open Air and Metalcamp. Suicidal Angels opened the Greek leg of the Sonisphere Festival in 2010, supporting Anthrax, Megadeth, Slayer, and Metallica.

=== Dead Again, Bloodbath and Divide and Conquer (2010–2015) ===
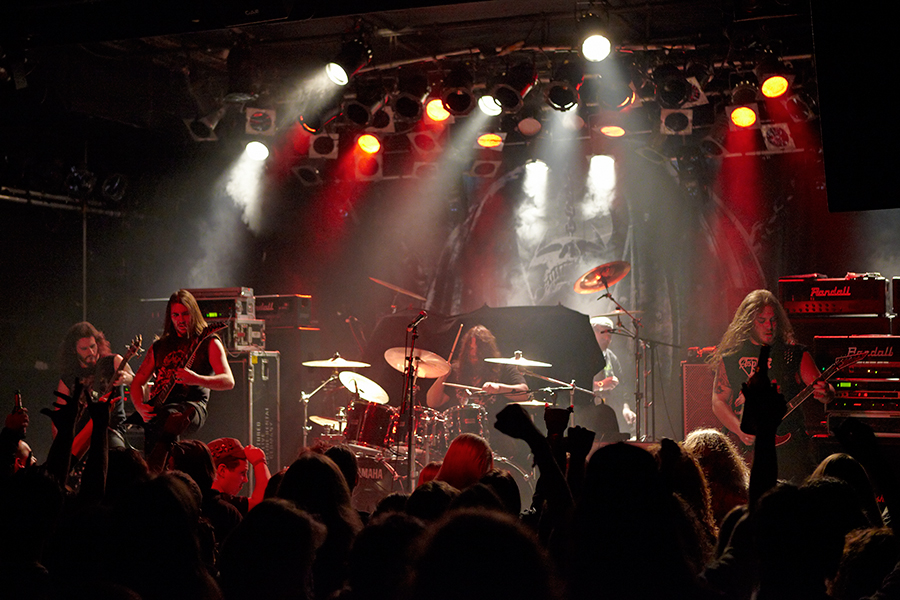
Suicidal Angels performing in Berlin in 2010

In 2010, they released their third studio record, Dead Again, and toured with Steelwing, Enforcer, and Cauldron. That year, Suicidal Angels toured with respected thrash metal bands, opening for Kreator, Exodus, and Death Angel during the Thrashfest Tour 2010.

In spring of 2011, the band toured Eastern Europe with Death Angel, and participated in summer festivals in Ukraine.

The band recorded their fourth album, Bloodbath, in the fall of 2011, and released it in January 2012, entering the German charts at #84 and the Austrian charts at #78. The release of the record was followed by the Full of Hate Tour 2012, including Cannibal Corpse, Behemoth, Legion of the Damned, and Misery Index.

After that tour, the band was confirmed for more summer festivals, such as Brutal Assault Open Air in August of that year. After the end of summer, Chris Tsitsis replaced Panos Spanos on guitar. In 2013, found Suicidal Angels toured Latin America, starting at Mexico City, followed by shows in Brazil. After returning home, the band promoted Bloodbath with several shows all over Greece. Later on, they recorded their fifth album at "Zero Gravity" Studios in Athens, preceded by a month of pre-production. After Angel Lelikakis replaced Angel Kritsotakis on bass, recording resumed at the "Music Factory & Prophecy Studios". As soon as recording finished, the band worked with producer Fredrik Nordstrom at Fredman Studios in Gothenburg, Sweden. The result was Divide and Conquer, released on 10 January 2014, reaching #82 in the German charts.

Shortly after, the band headlined the Conquering Europe Tour, which resulted in the band's first live album, Conquering Europe, recorded in Essen, Germany.

=== Division of Blood, Years of Aggression and Profane Prayer (2016–present) ===
Suicidal Angels released their sixth albumm Division of Bloodm in 2016. Gus Drax replaced Chris Tsitsis on guitar.

On 1 June 2018, Suicidal Angels announced on their official website that they were working on their seventh studio album, Years of Aggression, released on 9 August 2019. The album entered the charts at #33 in Germany, #63 in Austria and #71 in Switzerland. The production took place at Soundlodge Studiom where the drums where recorded, and also at Zero Gravity Studios, where they recorded guitars, vocals, and bass. After they finished the recordings, the band entered Fascination Street Studios in Sweden, where Jens Bogren mixed the album and Tony Lindgren mastered it.

The band participated in the fall 2018 MTV Headbangers Ball European Tour with Exodus, Death Angel and Sodom.

In March 2023, it was announced that Suicidal Angels left Nuclear Blast and were working on their eighth studio album. Six months later, vocalist and guitarist Nick Melissourgos said that the band had finished recording, mixing and mastering the album. It was announced on 24 November 2023 that the album, Profane Player, would be released on 1 March 2024.

On 26 March 2025, a week after the Eastern European Profanation Tour concluded, Gus Drax and the Band announced on their respective Instagram profiles that they have officially parted ways after 9 and a half years.

== Members ==
=== Current members ===
- Nick Melissourgos – vocals, rhythm guitar (2001 – present)
- Orfeas Tzortzopoulos – drums (2003 – present)
- Angel Lelikakis – bass (2013 – present)
- Stamatis Syrakos — lead guitar (2025 — present)

=== Past members ===
- Themis Katsimichas – lead guitar (2005–2009)
- Panos Spanos – lead guitar (2009-2012)
- Chris Tsitsis – lead guitar (2012-2015)
- Gus Drax – lead guitar (2015–2025)
- Christina Gemidopoulou – bass (2005–2006)
- Sotiris Skarpalezos – bass (2006–2009)
- Angelos Kritsotakis – bass (2009–2013)

== Gallery ==
Suicidal Angels, band members live at Rock & Metal Day'z 2026 at Oschersleben

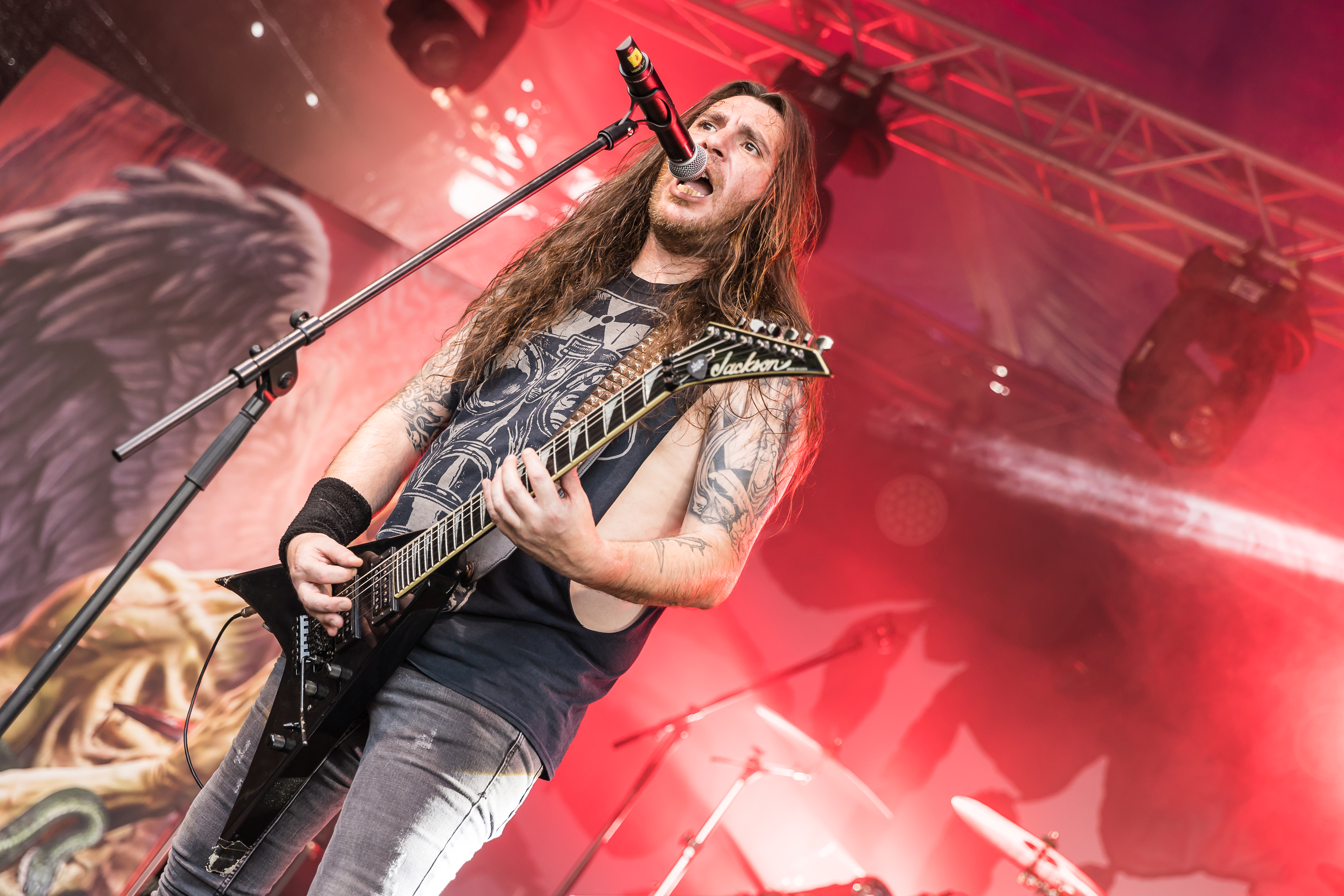
Nick Melissourgos, vocals, guitar

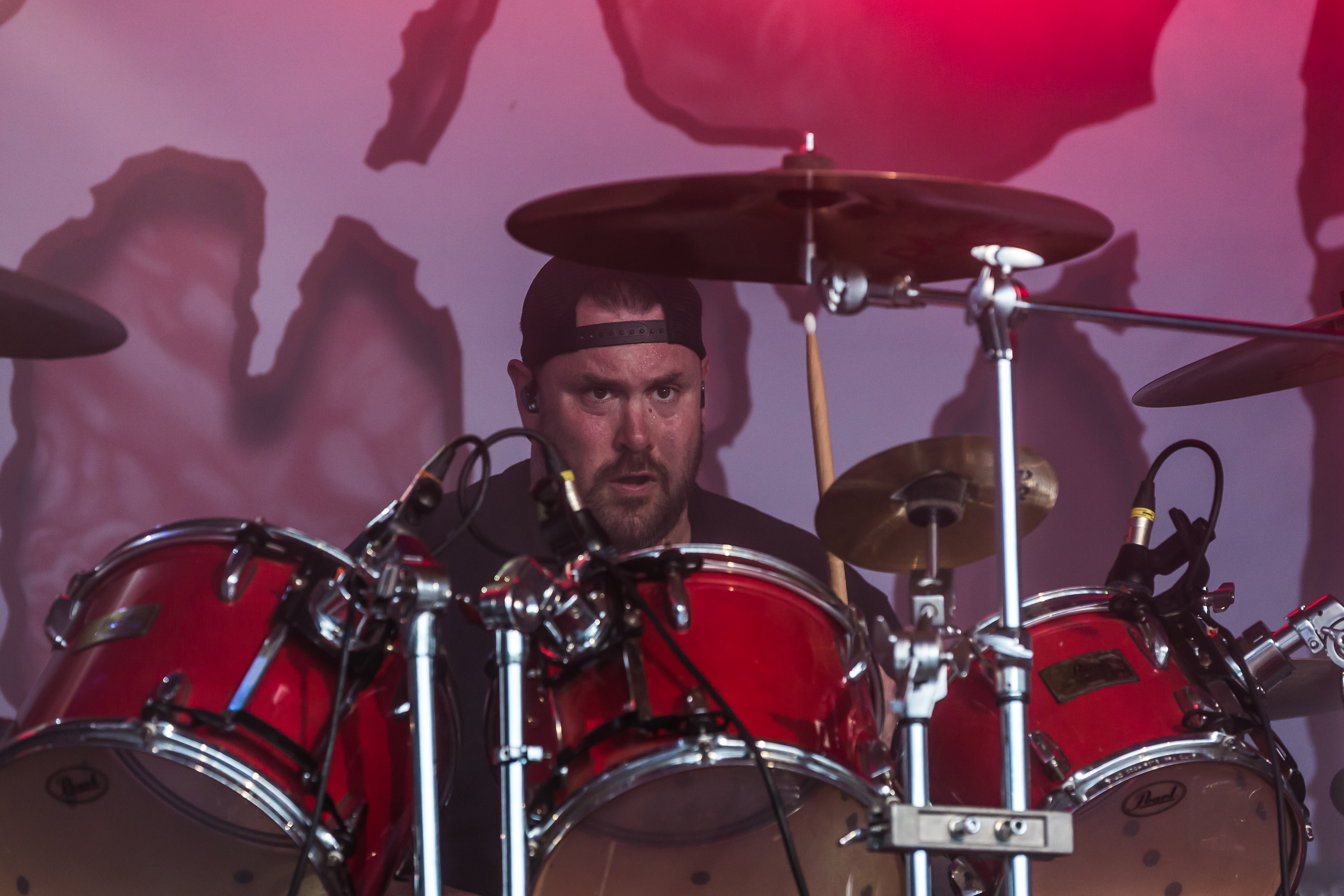
Orfeas Tzortzopoulos, drums

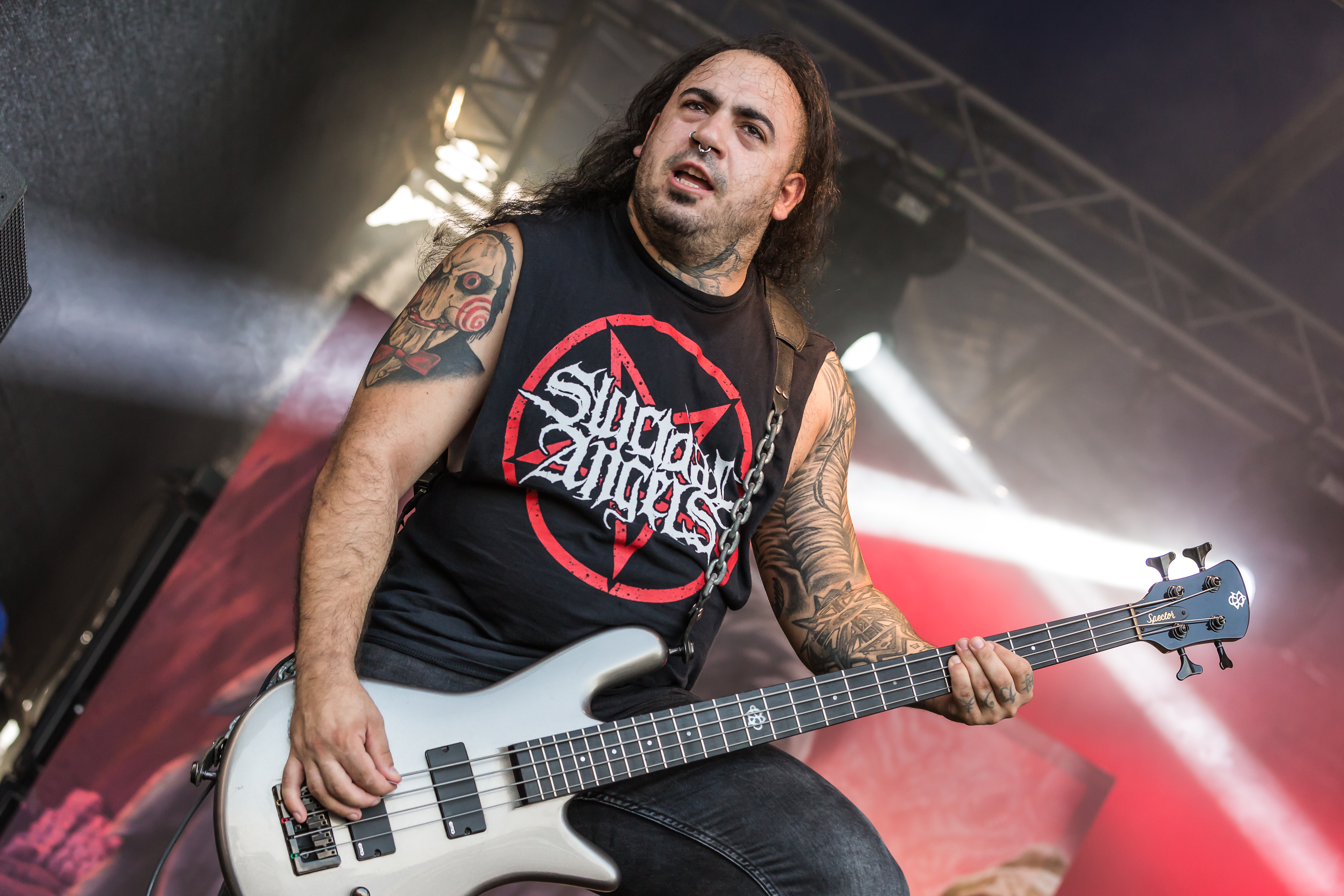
Aggelos Lelikakis, bass

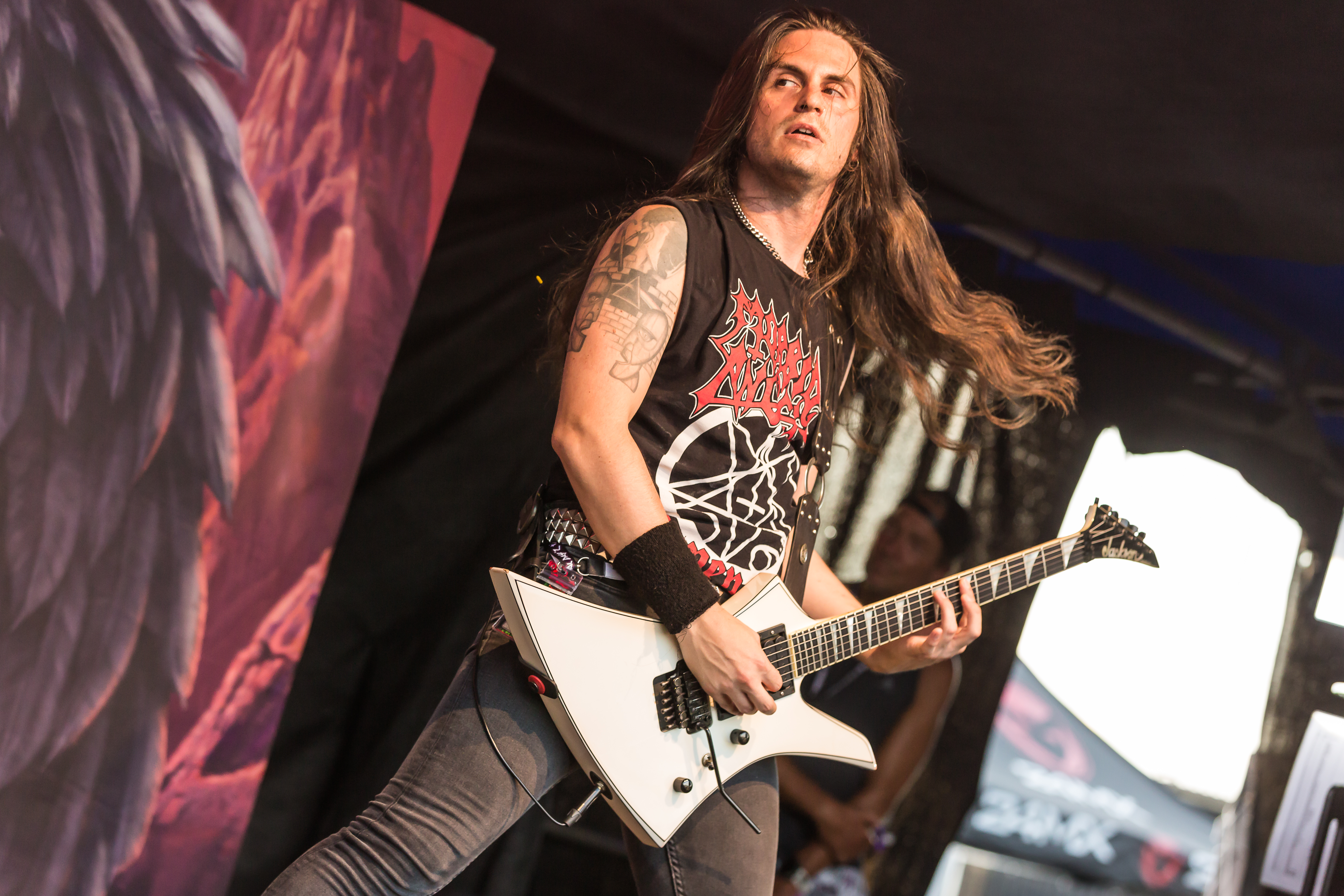
Stamatis Syrakos, guitar

== Discography ==
=== Studio albums ===
Year	Album	Album details	Peak positions		
Year	Album	Album details	GER	AUS	SWI
2007	Eternal Domination	Released: 16 July 2007; Label: OSM Records; Formats: CD, Digital Download	–	–	–
2009	Sanctify the Darkness	Released: 20 November 2009; Label: Nuclear Blast; Formats: CD, Vinyl, Digital Download	–	–	–
2010	Dead Again	Released: 19 November 2010; Label: NoiseArt; Formats: CD, Vinyl, Digital Download	–	–	–
2012	Bloodbath	Released: 27 January 2012; Label: NoiseArt; Formats: CD, Vinyl, Digital Download	84	78	–
2014	Divide and Conquer	Released: 10 January 2014; Label: NoiseArt; Formats: CD, Vinyl, Digital Download	82	–	–
2016	Division of Blood	Released: 27 May 2016; Label: NoiseArt; Formats: CD, Vinyl, Digital Download	93	–	–
2019	Years of Aggression	Released: 9 August 2019; Label: NoiseArt; Formats: CD, Vinyl, Digital Download	33	63	71
2024	Profane Prayer	Released: 1 March 2024; Label: Nuclear Blast; Formats: CD, Vinyl, Digital Download	–	–	–

=== EPs ===
- Bloodthirsty Humanity (2005)
- Armies of Hell (2006)

=== Demos ===
- United by Hate (2002)
- Angels' Sacrifice (2003)
- The Calm Before the Storm (2004)

=== Live albums ===
- Conquering Europe (2016)
