= Void Terra Firma =

1990 thrash metal album by Defiance

Studio album by Defiance
- Released: March 26, 1990
- Recorded: December 1989 at Prairie Sun Recording Studios, Cotati, California
- Genre: Thrash metal
- Length: 40:10
- Label: Roadracer Records
- Producer: John Cuniberti

Defiance chronology
Product of Society (1989)	Void Terra Firma (1990)	Beyond Recognition (1992)

Professional ratings
Review scores
Source	Rating
AllMusic	3/5 stars

Void Terra Firma is the second album by American thrash metal band Defiance, released in 1990. It was the first album to feature vocalist Steev Esquivel. It was advertised as being recorded "Live and in Your Face!"

This is Defiance's best known album, as it features their cover of Iron Maiden's "Killers".

== Track listing ==
1. "Void Terra Firma" (05:25)
2. "Deception of Faith" (04:28)
3. "Questions" (04:58)
4. "Skitz-Illusions" (03:26)
5. "Slayground" (03:30)
6. "Killers" (04:42) (Iron Maiden cover)
7. "Steamroller" (03:23)
8. "Checkmate" (03:39)
9. "Buried or Burned" (03:22)
10. "Last Resort (Welcome to Poverty)" (03:16)

=== Re-release bonus tracks ===
1. Violent Remedy (Void) – (live) (5:27)
2. Skitz-Illusions – (demo) (3:43)
3. Checkmate – (demo) (3:39)
4. Deception of Faith – (demo) (4:37)
5. Checkmate – (live) (4:15)
6. Drum Solo-Lockjaw – (live) (6:26)
7. The Fault – (live) (3:14)

== Personnel ==
- Steev Esquivel – lead vocals
- Doug Harrington – guitars
- Jim Adams – guitars
- Mike Kaufmann – bass
- Matt Vander Ende – drums
