= Annihilation of Civilization =

Studio album by Evildead
- Released: September 1989
- Recorded: July 30, 1988 – March 25, 1989
- Studio: Music Grinder, Los Angeles
- Genre: Thrash metal, crossover thrash
- Length: 38:59
- Label: SPV/Steamhammer
- Producer: Evildead, Casey McMakin

Evildead chronology
Rise Above (1989)	Annihilation of Civilization (1989)	The Underworld (1991)

Professional ratings
Review scores
Source	Rating
Rock Hard	7.5/10 stars

Annihilation of Civilization is the debut album by American thrash metal band Evildead. It was released in September 1989 on Steamhammer Records, and was preceded by the EP Rise Above, released some months earlier. The album and the single "Annihilation of Civilization" earned Evildead widespread recognition in large part due to airplay of the single's video on MTV's Headbangers Ball.

Annihilation of Civilization was the only Evildead album for 31 years to feature Albert Gonzales on guitar and Rob Alaniz on drums. The lineup that recorded this album (except bassist Mel Sanchez, who was replaced by Karlos Medina) would be reunited for their third album United States of Anarchy (2020).

== Track listing ==
- All songs written and arranged by Evildead.
1. "F.C.I./The Awakening" – 3:22
2. "Annihilation of Civilization" – 4:17
3. "Living Good" – 5:33
4. "Future Shock" – 5:39
5. "Holy Trials" – 5:39
6. "Gone Shooting" – 4:47
7. "Parricide" – 4:23
8. "Unauthorized Exploitation" – 3:21
9. "B.O.H.I.C.A." – 1:56
10. "Rise Above" (Black Flag cover) – 3:33
11. "Slow-Death" – 3:26
12. "Run Again" – 4:02
- "F.C.I. / The Awakening" contains an audio excerpt from the horror film The Evil Dead, the film from which the band took their name.
- "B.O.H.I.C.A." is a CD bonus track and did not appear on the vinyl release.
- The last three tracks, which are from the Rise Above EP, were featured as bonus tracks on the 2004 reissue.

== Personnel ==
- Phil Flores – vocals
- Albert Gonzales – guitars
- Juan Garcia – guitars
- Mel Sanchez – bass
- Rob Alaniz – drums
- Ed Repka – cover art
