= Ed Repka =

American graphic artist (born 1960)

Edward J. Repka (born October 22, 1960) is an American graphic artist, best known for creating album covers for metal bands as well as shirt designs, including those featuring Megadeth's mascot Vic Rattlehead. Repka's portfolio also includes Dark Angel's logo and model designs for the Hellraiser films. He works for the National Entertainment Collectibles Association as their lead painter and head of art direction.

Repka's artwork based on the original Universal Studios film The Wolf Man was used as the cover art for the first issue of horror magazine HorrorHound.

Repka admits that despite being known as the "King of Thrash Metal Art," he is not a big fan of the genre. He is more into the punk genre like the Misfits.

== List of works ==
- 3 Inches of Blood – Advance & Vanquish
- Aggression (Spanish band) – Moshpirit
- After All – Dawn of the Enforcer
- After All – Rejection Overruled
- After All – Waves of Annihilation
- Abiotx – Straight to Hell
- Ancesthor – Beneath the Mask
- Atheist – Piece of Time
- Austrian Death Machine – Total Brutal
- Austrian Death Machine – Double Brutal
- Austrian Death Machine – Triple Brutal
- The Black Zombie Procession – Mess with the Best, Die Like the Rest
- Besieged – Victims Beyond All Help
- Bloodfreak – Scared Stiff
- Brainwreck – Evil Waysl
- Burning Nitrum – Molotov
- Chorpuss – "Witch of the Moor"
- Circle Jerks – VI
- Condition Critical – Operational Hazard
- Dark Angel – Darkness Descends
- Dark Angel – Leave Scars
- Deal With it – End Time Prophecies
- Death – Scream Bloody Gore
- Death – Leprosy
- Death – Spiritual Healing
- Defiance – Product of Society
- Defiance – Beyond Recognition
- Dismantle – Satanic Force
- DSA Commando – Sputo
- Eliminator – Breaking the Wheel
- Elm Street – Barbed Wire Metal
- Evil Survives – Judas Priest Live
- Evil Survives – Powerkiller
- Exeloume – Fairytale of Perversion
- Exeloume – Return of the Nephilim
- Evildead – Annihilation of Civilization
- Evildead – The Underworld
- Evildead – United States of Anarchy
- Faith Or Fear – Instruments of Death
- Fallen Man – Mercenary
- Frade Negro – Black Souls in the Abyss (Brazilian band)
- Frade Negro – The Attack of the Damned
- Flesher – Tales Of Grotesque Demise
- Gruesome – Dimensions of Horror
- Gruesome – Savage Land
- Gruesome – Twisted Prayers
- Guillotine – Blood Money
- Hell's Domain – Hell's Domain
- Hexen – State of Insurgency
- Hirax – El Rostro de la Muerte
- Holy Grail – Improper Burial
- Hyades – And the Worst Is Yet to Come
- Hyades – The Roots of Trash
- Infinite Translation – Impulsive Attack
- Infinite Translation – Masked Reality
- Killjoy – Compelled by Fear
- Korrosive - Toxic Apokalypse
- Lost Society – Fast Loud Death
- Ludichrist – Immaculate Deception
- Mad Maze – Frames of Alienation
- Massacre – From Beyond
- Massacre – Inhuman Condition
- Megadeth – "Holy Wars... The Punishment Due"
- Megadeth – Peace Sells... but Who's Buying?
- Megadeth – "Hangar 18"
- Megadeth – "No More Mr. Nice Guy"
- Megadeth – Rust in Peace
- Megadeth – Rusted Pieces
- Merciless Death – Evil in the Night
- Morbid Saint – Swallowed by Hell
- Municipal Waste – Hazardous Mutation
- Miss Djax – Inferno
- Miss Djax – Stereo Destroyer
- Napalm – Cruel Tranquility
- Necro – The Pre-Fix for Death
- NOFX – S&M Airlines
- Nuclear Assault – Game Over
- Pánico Al Miedo – Pánico Al Miedo
- Pitiful Reign – Visual Violence
- Possessed – Beyond the Gates
- Ravage – The End of Tomorrow
- Red Razor – Beer Revolution
- Ruff Neck – Ruff Treatment
- Sanctuary – Refuge Denied
- Sanctuary – Inception
- Skull Vomit – Deadly Observation
- S.O.B. – Gate of Doom
- Solstice – Solstice
- Steelwing – Lord of the Wasteland
- Suicidal Angels – Dead Again
- Suicidal Angels – Bloodbath
- Suicidal Angels – Divide and Conquer
- Suicidal Angels – "Division of Blood"
- Suicide Watch – Global Warning
- Toxic Holocaust – Hell on Earth
- Toxik – World Circus
- Toxik – Think This
- Ultra Violence – Deflect the Flow
- Ultra-Violence – Privilege to Overcome
- Uncle Slam – Will Work for Food
- Uncle Slam – When God Dies
- Untimely Demise – Black Widow
- Untimely Demise – City of Steel
- Untimely Demise – Full Speed Metal
- Untimely Demise – No Promise of Tomorrow
- Untimely Demise – Systematic Eradication
- Various Artists – Butchering the Beatles – A Headbashing Tribute
- Various Artists – Thrash or Be Thrashed – An International Tribute to Thrash
- Venom – Here Lies
- Vio-lence – Eternal Nightmare
- Violent Playground – Thrashin Blues
- Whiplash – Unborn Again
- Wrathchild America – Climbin' the Walls
- Wild – Calles de Fuego (Spanish band)
- Wild – La Nueva Orden
- Zero Down – Good Times... At the Gates of Hell
- Zero Down – "No Limit to the Evil"
- Zombis Do Espaco – Em uma missão de Satanas
- Zumbis Do Espaco – Nos Viemos Em Paz
