= Steel Prophet =

American power metal band

- Origin: Middletown, Connecticut, U.S.
- Genres: Power metal
- Years active: 1984–present
- Labels: Nuclear Blast, ROAR
- Members: Steve Kaschinsky; Vince Dennis; Jon Paget; John Tarascio; R.D. Liapakis

Steel Prophet is an American power metal band led by the founder and main writer Steve Kachinsky.

== History ==
The band started in 1984 in Middletown, Connecticut. The group's initial lineup consisted of Steve Kachinsky on guitar, Gary Stocking on vocals, Wayne Faircloth on bass, and Harry Blackwell on drums; Blackwell's father was jazz drummer Ed Blackwell. Blackwell and Stocking left the group late in 1985; J.T. Tarascio joined on drums in 1985 before Kachinsky moved the group to California in 1987. Following the move Kachinsky and Tarascio reconstituted the group with bassist Vince Dennis, singer Scott Lindsenbardt, and guitarist Domenic Chavira. Lindsenbardt was quickly replaced by Nick Mantis, who was himself replaced by Rick Mythiasin; Chavira left the group about the same time Mantis did, and was replaced by Jon Paget.

In 1990, they released a demo album Inner Ascendance, after which time Paget left; Horacio Colmenares replaced him on guitar. The success eventually led the band to release their first full-length album. It was called The Goddess Principle and was released in 1995. It contained completely new songs; no demo song was re-used on it. One year later, in 1996, the band released an EP called Continuum. Following this, Tarascio and Colmenares departed, and drummer Pete Parada and guitarist Jon Pons joined.

In 1997, the band released their second studio album called Into the Void (Hallucinogenic Conception). The style of music changed in a way that most of the complex song structures were replaced by simpler structures.

They next signed with Nuclear Blast. In early 1999, Steel Prophet released their third studio album Dark Hallucinations. The album consisted of concept songs that followed the storyline of Ray Bradbury's dystopian novel Fahrenheit 451. Musically, the style again changed again, losing a bit of complexity in favor of speed and power. In early 2000, the band released their fourth studio album Messiah which took the style of the previous album but took it to new, more melodic and more experimental levels.

In September 2000, the band re-released their demo Inner Ascendance for the first time on CD, together with various cover songs. This release was called Genesis.

Pete Parada left the group after the release of "Into the Void", and Pat Magrath joined on drums for "Dark Hallucinations"; Kevin Cafferty filled in at Wacken and the Heavy Oder Was festivals, and played on the "Messiah" album. After Messiah was released Jon Pons departed, with Jim Williams replacing him on guitar. By the end of 2000, the band already had their next studio album completely written and pre-produced - but because they did not want to put out a third release in one year, they decided to release Book Of The Dead in early 2001. This album had still the same style of music as the previous two albums, but was also packed with references of the first album The Goddess Principle. Two of the new songs use the same short intros as two songs on the debut album and the slow instrumental song Ruby Dreams (Fear And Hope) from the debut album appeared in a re-recorded and rearranged version.

In 2002, the band released their sixth studio album Unseen. The album title was a reference to a song the band had on their album Messiah. Unseen was the first Steel Prophet release that did not have a booklet.

Vocalist Mythiasin left the band in June 2002. In the process of making the album Unseen, band leader Kachinsky did not want Mythiasin to use his characteristic high-pitched voice on the album anymore. The majority of lyrics were written by Mythiasin.

In 2004, new vocalist Nadir D`Priest joined the band. Soon after that, they released their seventh and last studio album Beware through Nightmare Records. The album brought a slight glam rock vibe into the music. Shortly after that former Hellion bassist Glenn Cannon was added to the lineup while Vince Dennis (Vincent Price) was on tour with Ice T's band Body Count. Dennis later rejoined Steel Prophet.

Half a year later, Kachinsky announced that they once again changed their vocalist. It was announced that Bruce Hall, vocalist of the band Agent Steel, was the new vocalist for Steel Prophet. Yet, no new material was recorded with him and no live shows were played either.

In March 2007, Kachinsky announced that Mythiasin rejoined the band. On May 4, 2008, the new song Trickery Of The Scourge, with Mythiasin as vocalist, was uploaded to the official Steel Prophet MySpace site. It was also announced that plenty of new songs were being recorded.

The 2008 release The Shallows Of Forever by Steel Legacy Records consists of very old recordings from a time before the band had even released their first demo Inner Ascendance.

In February 2011, Kachinsky announced on the official Steel Prophet internet forum that the band has got 8 songs ready and will start recording the new album when another 6 songs will be done. The album will contain a new metal version of the fun-song Oleander that was the outro of their 2001 album Book Of The Dead.

Over the course of 2014, the band began re-releasing their previous albums as remastered vinyl editions, starting with the release of The Goddess Principle on January 31 (limited to 400 pcs worldwide, including a limited to 150 pcs worldwide edition with black & white splatter look and bonus Steel Prophet logo pin and patch) and continuing with the Continuum EP and Into the Void combined on one release on September 19 (CD version including a limited Steel Prophet logo patch) and November 28 (vinyl version, including a limited to 150 pcs worldwide blue vinyl edition with Steel Prophet logo pin).

On July 8, 2014, Steel Prophet released their long-awaited album Omniscient featuring Mythiasin's vocals once again. On March 18, the album was also released on vinyl (including a limited to 150 pcs worldwide mint-green vinyl edition).

On August 8, 2015, Mythiasin announced on his official projects Facebook page that he was no longer in Steel Prophet.

On February 2, 2019, Steel Prophet has announced in its official Facebook site new singer R.D. Liapakis of Mystic Prophecy and upcoming new studio album The God Machine in 2019.

== Discography ==
Studio albums

- Inner Ascendance (1990)
- The Goddess Principle (1995)
- Into the Void (Hallucinogenic Conception) (1997)
- Dark Hallucinations (Nuclear Blast, 1999)
- Messiah (Nuclear Blast, 2000)
- Genesis (Nuclear Blast, 2000)
- Book of the Dead (Nuclear Blast, 2001)
- Unseen (Nuclear Blast, 2002)
- Beware (Nightmare Records, 2004)
- Shallows Of Forever (Steel Legacy Records, 2008)
- The Goddess Principle (vinyl rerelease) (Pure Steel Records, 2014)
- Omniscient (Cruz Del Sur Records, 2014)
- Omniscient (vinyl re-release) (Cruz Del Sur Records, 2015)
- The God Machine (ROAR, 2019)

EPs

- Continuum EP (1996)
- Into the Void & Continuum EP (re-release) (Pure Steel Records, 2014)
- Into the Void & Continuum EP (vinyl re-release) (Pure Steel Records, 2014)

== Band members ==
Current

- Steve Kachinsky – guitars (1984–present)
- Vince Dennis – bass (1988–2004, 2007–present)
- Jon Paget – guitars (1989–1995, 2015–present)
- John Tarascio – drums (2015–present)
- R.D. Liapakis – vocals (2019-present)

Former

- Rick Mythiasin – vocals (1987–2002, 2007–2015)
- Nadir D'Priest – vocals (2003–2004)
- Bruce Hall – vocals (2004–2007)
- Nick Mantis – vocals (1988–1989)
- Scott Lindsenbardt – vocals (1988)
- Gary Stocking – vocals (1983–1985)
- Jimmy Williams – guitars (2000–2002)
- John Pons – guitars (1996–2000)
- Horacio Colmenares – guitars (1995–1996, 2007–2013)
- Domenic Chavira – guitars (1988–1989)
- Pete Skermetta – guitars (2003–2004)
- Tim Thomas – guitars (2004–2007)
- Glenn Cannon – bass (2004–2007)
- Wayne Faircloth – bass (1983–1988)
- Gene McEven – drums (2004–?)
- Karl Rosqvist – drums (2001–2004)
- Pat Magrath – drums (1999)
- Pete Parada – drums (1996–1999)
- Harry Blackwell – drums (1983–1985)
- Kevin Cafferty – drums (1999–2001, 2004)
- Steve Aresco – drums
- Charles Schleyer – guitars (2013–2015)
- James Schultz – drums (2013–2015)

Live

- Neil Turbin - vocals (2015)
