= Rhauderfehn =

- Municipality
- Flag Coat of arms

- Location of Rhauderfehn within Leer district
- Interactive map of Rhauderfehn
- Location within Germany Location within Lower Saxony
- Coordinates: 53°10′N 07°33′E
- Country: Germany
- State: Lower Saxony
- District: Leer
- Subdivisions: 10 districts

Government
  - Mayor (2019–24): Geert Müller (SPD)

Area
  - Total: 102.92 km^{2} (39.74 sq mi)
- Elevation: 4 m (13 ft)

Population (2025-12-31)
  - Total: 18,199
  - Density: 176.83/km^{2} (457.98/sq mi)
- Time zone: UTC+01:00 (CET)
  - Summer (DST): UTC+02:00 (CEST)
- Postal codes: 26817
- Dialling codes: 0 49 52
- Vehicle registration: LER
- Website: www.rhauderfehn.de

Rhauderfehn is a municipality in the Leer district, in Lower Saxony, Germany.
