= Juan Garcia (guitarist) =

Cuban-American guitarist (born 1963)

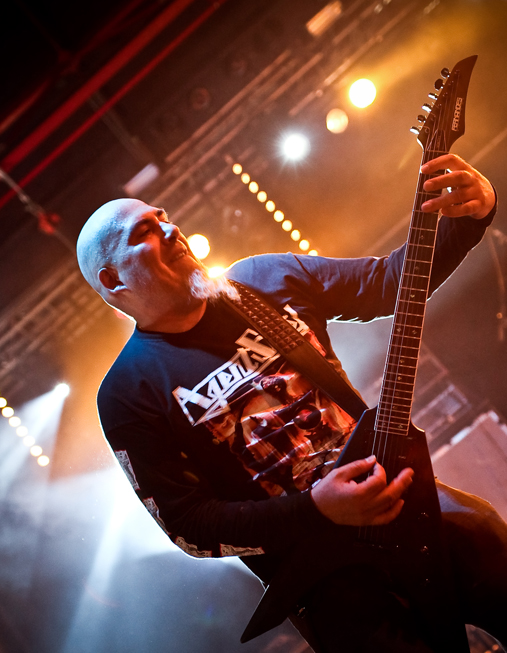

Background information
- Also known as: Juan of the Dead
- Born: November 24, 1963 (age 62); Havana, Cuba
- Genres: Speed metal, thrash metal, heavy metal
- Occupation: Guitarist
- Years active: 1982–present
- Member of: Evildead, Body Count
- Formerly of: Abattoir, Agent Steel, Terror
- Website: bodycountband.com

Juan García (born November 24, 1963) is a Cuban-American guitarist. He is perhaps best known as the guitarist for the thrash metal bands Agent Steel and Evildead and the power metal/speed metal band Abattoir. Garcia is also the rhythm guitarist of Body Count, where he is known by the stage name Juan of the Dead.

== Biography ==
In 1982, Garcia joined the newly formed heavy metal band Abattoir along with bassist Mel Sanchez, guitarist Mark Caro, drummer Ron Gonzales, and vocalist Chris Maleki. He played on the band's early demos 'Abattoir (1983)' and 'Demo 1984' (1984); He also performed on the debut Abattoir 'Vicious Attack' Lp released on Combat Records before leaving the band in October 1984 to join Agent Steel. He recorded on two classic albums with Agent Steel 'Skeptics Apocalypse' (1985) and 'Unstoppable Force' (1987) as well as their EP 'Mad Locust Rising' (1986). After leaving Agent Steel in 1987, Garcia reunited with Mel Sanchez to form Evildead, with the intention to write heavy music with more hardcore and thrash metal elements; more so than their previous bands; EvilDead's debut show was at Fender's Ballroom in Long Beach, California along with Possessed, Dark Angel, and Cryptic Slaughter. The band's name was inspired from the Sam Raimi horror film 'The Evil Dead'. Their lyrics focused on exploring political and social themes mixed with horror and nuclear war topics. During their initial career, Evildead released two albums, a live recording and an EP all on SPV/Steamhammer Records. After several lineup changes and an attempt to make a third album, the band broke up in 1995.

After Evildead folded, Garcia, along with his former bandmates Karlos Medina, Dan Flores and Jon Dette ( replaced by Eddie Livingston and later Rigo Amezcua ) formed a new band, Terror (not to be confused with the hardcore punk band with the same name). This band would follow the same vein as Evildead, but with lyrics and vocals in Spanish. After managing to release their debut album 'Hijos de Los Cometas' on BMG/Culebra (now out of print) in 1997 and a self-titled EP in 1998; Terror split up and Garcia returned to Agent Steel to record co-write and record the comeback album 'Omega Conspiracy'. He was also contributed guitars on the Killing Machine 'Metalmorphosis' second release which featured James Rivera (Helstar) on vocals, and David Ellefson (Megadeth) on bass.

In 2008, Garcia recorded guitar tracks for the song 'Santa Claus Is Back In Town' featuring Tim "Ripper" Owens on vocals, lead guitarist Steve Morse, bassist Marco Mendoza, and drummer Vinny Appice, for "We Wish you a Metal Xmas" compilation which landed on the U.S. Billboard charts. Also that year, Garcia performed with Agent Steel at the 'Bang Your Head Festival' in Germany, and 'Graspop Metal Meeting' in Belgium. Evildead would reunite in the summer of 2009 and began rehearsals for 'Thrasho De Mayo' event that was held in Los Angeles in May 2010. The band also performed at the "Way of Darkness Festival" in Germany later in 2010. The line up featured vocalist, Steve Nelson (Winterthrall, Noctuary), Rob Alaniz (original drummer), Albert Gonzalez (original guitarist), Mel Sanchez (original bassist), and Juan Garcia (original guitarist). Evildead had been writing new music for a 2012 release. However, it was announced on October 17, 2012, that the band was no more. In April 2013, Garcia released a 4-song EP with members of Agent Steel under the moniker Masters of Metal. On November 9, 2013, Garcia joined Body Count featuring Ice-T on vocals on rhythm guitar for a live appearance in Austin, Texas at the "Fun Fun Fun Festival" and is now a full-time member of the band after completing a full U.S. Tour to support the release of the "Manslaughter" album as part of the Rockstar Energy Drink Mayhem Festival.

On March 31, 2017, Body Count released a full-length album, Bloodlust, on Century Media Records which received a Grammy nomination for "Best Metal Performance" for the song "Black Hoodie". On March 6, 2020, Body Count released their album Carnivore, which received a Grammy Award for "Best Metal Performance" for the song "Bum-Rush". Garcia is still working with Evildead who have released a full-length album on October 30, 2020 featuring the return of original vocalist Phil Flores through SPV/Steamhammer. Evildead toured Europe in the summer of 2023 with performances at Wacken Open Air (DE), Brutal Assault (CZ), and Alcatraz Metal Festival in Kortrijk, Belgium. Evildead released their latest and 4th studio album "Toxic Grace" in May, 2024. On November 22, 2024 Body Count released their latest studio full-length album "Merciless" on Century Media.

== Discography ==
=== Studio albums ===
- Abattoir – 'Vicious Attack' (1985)
- Agent Steel – 'Skeptics Apocalypse' (1985)
- Agent Steel – 'Unstoppable Force' (1987)
- Evildead – Annihilation of Civilization (1989)
- Evildead – The Underworld (1991)
- Evildead – Live ....From The Depths of The Underworld (1992)
- Terror – 'Hijos De Los Cometas' (1997)
- Agent Steel – 'Omega Conspiracy' (1999)
- Agent Steel – 'Order of the illuminati' (2003)
- Killing Machine – Metalmorphosis (2006)
- Agent Steel – 'Alienigma' (2007)
- Body Count – Manslaughter (2014)
- Body Count – Bloodlust (2017)
- Body Count – Carnivore (2020)
- Evildead – United $tate$ of Anarchy (2020)
- Evildead – Toxic Grace (2024)
- Body Count – Merciless (2024)

=== Extended plays ===
- Agent Steel – 'Mad Locust Rising' (1986)
- EvilDead – 'Rise Above' (1989)
- Masters of Metal – Self-titled (2013)
- Masters of Metal – From Worlds Beyond (2015)

== Awards and nominations ==
Year	Nominee / work	Award	Result	Ref.
2018	"Black Hoodie"	Grammy Award for Best Metal Performance	Nominated	
