= Machine Head discography =

Band discography

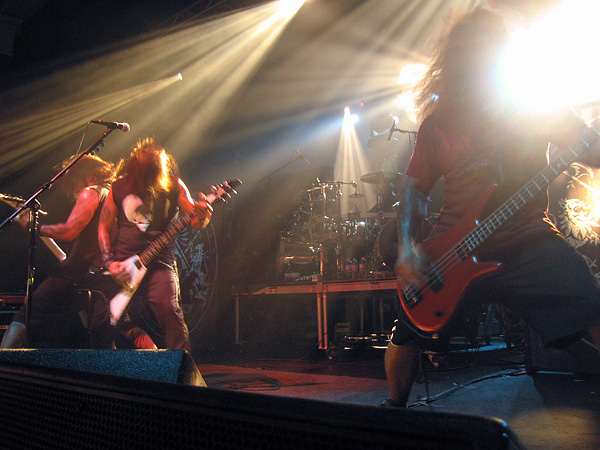
- Machine Head live in 2006. From left to right: Phil Demmel, Robb Flynn, and Adam Duce
- Studio albums: 11
- Extended plays: 2
- Live albums: 2
- Singles: 13
- Video albums: 1
- Music videos: 15

Machine Head is an American heavy metal band formed in 1991 by vocalist/guitarist Robb Flynn and bassist Adam Duce. They have released eleven studio albums, two live albums, one extended play, one video album, and thirteen singles. Later that year, Logan Mader and Tony Costanza were hired as guitarist and drummer respectively. Costanza left the band shortly afterwards, being replaced by Chris Kontos. In 1993, they signed to Roadrunner Records and released their debut album, Burn My Eyes, in 1994. Their second album, The More Things Change..., was released in 1997.

In 1999, Machine Head released The Burning Red, with this album the band changed its musical direction and were accused of selling out. Despite backlash from the media, the album debuted at number 88 on the Billboard 200. In 2001, Machine Head released its fourth studio album, Supercharger. The music video for "Crashing Around You", taken from this album, was avoided by MTV after the September 11, 2001 attacks due to its depictions of falling buildings. After the music video ban, Roadrunner stopped promoting the album, causing the band to leave the label after the release of a live album, Hellalive, only for contract obligations. The band's fifth studio album, Through the Ashes of Empires, was released in Europe and caught the attention of Roadrunner US. The label asked the band to re-sign to them and the band accepted. In March 2007, Machine Head released its sixth studio album, The Blackening, which debuted at number 54 on the Billboard 200, their highest chart position in the United States.

== Albums ==
=== Studio albums ===
Title	Album details	Peak chart positions										Sales	Certifications
Title	Album details	US	AUS	AUT	FRA	GER	JPN	NLD	SWE	SWI	UK	Sales	Certifications
Burn My Eyes	Released: August 9, 1994; Label: Roadrunner	—	—	29	—	35	—	45	38	—	25	US: 150,000+; WW: 400,000+	ARIA: Gold; BPI: Gold
The More Things Change...	Released: March 25, 1997; Label: Roadrunner	138	30	24	21	22	—	22	17	—	16	US: 115,000+; WW: 400,000	
The Burning Red	Released: August 9, 1999; Label: Roadrunner	88	30	22	55	15	93	35	17	—	13	US: 150,000+; WW: 400,000	BPI: Silver
Supercharger	Released: October 2, 2001; Label: Roadrunner	115	24	33	35	25	59	88	42	82	34	US: 50,000+	
Through the Ashes of Empires	Released: April 20, 2004; Label: Roadrunner	88	91	56	44	24	—	65	41	80	77	US: 100,000+	BPI: Silver
The Blackening	Released: March 27, 2007; Label: Roadrunner	54	14	19	36	12	53	29	19	29	16	US: 150,000+	BPI: Gold
Unto the Locust	Released: September 27, 2011; Label: Roadrunner	22	10	6	18	5	18	20	14	10	43	US: 100,000+	
Bloodstone & Diamonds	Released: November 7, 2014; Label: Nuclear Blast	21	10	6	35	6	67	38	31	7	18	WW: 180,000+	
Catharsis	Released: January 26, 2018; Label: Nuclear Blast	65	10	3	34	3	50	41	—	4	12		
Of Kingdom and Crown	Released: August 26, 2022; Label: Nuclear Blast, Imperium	—	27	6	—	6	64	62	—	3	27		
Unatoned	Released: April 25, 2025; Label: Nuclear Blast, Imperium	—	—	3	—	5	—	—	—	7	71		
"—" denotes a release that did not chart.

=== Live albums ===
Title	Album details	Peak chart positions		
Title	Album details	FRA	GER	UK
Hellalive	Released: March 11, 2003; Label: Roadrunner	78	—	143
Machine Fucking Head Live	Released: November 13, 2012; Label: Roadrunner	115	62	—
"—" denotes a release that did not chart.

== Extended plays ==
Year	EP details	Notes
2011	The Black Procession: Released: April 16, 2011; Label: Roadrunner	Released exclusively for Record Store Day.
2021	Arrows in Words from the Sky: Released: June 10, 2021	

== Singles ==
Year	Song	Peak chart position				Album
Year	Song	US Main.	SCO	UK	UK Rock	Album
1994	"Davidian"	—	—	—	—	Burn My Eyes
1995	"Old"	—	37	43	2	Burn My Eyes
1997	"Ten Ton Hammer"	—	—	—	—	The More Things Change...
1997	"Take My Scars"	—	66	73	2	The More Things Change...
1999	"From This Day"	—	74	74	1	The Burning Red
2000	"The Blood, The Sweat, the Tears"	—	—	—	—	The Burning Red
2000	"Silver (Take My Hand)"	—	—	—	—	The Burning Red
2001	"Crashing Around You"	—	—	89	12	Supercharger
2003	"Imperium"	—	—	—	—	Through the Ashes of Empires
2004	"Days Turn Blue to Gray"	—	95	77	3	Through the Ashes of Empires
2007	"Aesthetics of Hate"	—	—	—	—	The Blackening
2007	"Now I Lay Thee Down"	—	—	—	—	The Blackening
2008	"Halo"	—	—	—	—	The Blackening
2011	"Locust"	—	—	—	5	Unto the Locust
2012	"Darkness Within"	35	—	—	—	Unto the Locust
2014	"Killers & Kings"	—	—	—	—	Bloodstone & Diamonds
2014	"Now We Die"	—	—	—	—	Bloodstone & Diamonds
2016	"Is There Anybody Out There?"	36	—	—	—	non-album single
2017	"Beyond the Pale"	—	—	—	—	Catharsis
2017	"Catharsis"	—	—	—	—	Catharsis
2017	"Kaleidoscope"	—	—	—	—	Catharsis
2019	"Do or Die"	—	—	—	—	non-album singles
2020	"Circle the Drain"	—	—	—	—	non-album singles
2020	"Stop the Bleeding (feat. Killswitch Engage's Jesse Leach)"	—	—	—	—	Civil Unrest EP
2020	"Bulletproof"	—	—	—	—	Civil Unrest EP
2020	"Circle the Drain (acoustic)"	—	—	—	—	non-album single
2020	"My Hands Are Empty"	—	—	—	—	Of Kingdom and Crown
2021	"Become the Firestorm"	—	—	—	—	Of Kingdom and Crown
2021	"Rotten"	—	—	—	—	Of Kingdom and Crown
2021	"Arrows in Words from the Sky"	—	—	—	—	Of Kingdom and Crown
2022	"Choke on the Ashes of Your Hate"	—	—	—	—	Of Kingdom and Crown
2022	"Unhallowed"	—	—	—	—	Of Kingdom and Crown
2022	"No Gods, No Masters"	—	—	—	—	Of Kingdom and Crown
2024	"These Scars Won't Define Us (feat. In Flames, Lacuna Coil & Unearth)"	—	—	—	—	Unatoned
2025	"Unbound"	—	—	—	—	Unatoned
2026	"Revenger (feat. Black Veil Brides)"	—	—	—	—	Vindicate
"—" denotes a release that did not chart.

=== Promotional singles ===
Year	Name	Album
2000	"Alcoholocaust"	Heavy Metal 2000 soundtrack and The Burning Red
2000	"Hole in the Sky"	Nativity in Black II: A Tribute to Black Sabbath
2009	"Beautiful Mourning"	The Blackening
2011	"This Is the End"	Unto the Locust

== Videos ==
=== Video albums ===
Year	Video details	Peak chart positions		
Year	Video details	US^{[a]}	SWE	UK
2005	Elegies: Released: October 11, 2005; Label: Roadrunner (#610944); Format: DVD	13	7	4

a.Refers to the Billboard Top Music Video chart.

=== Music videos ===
Year	Song	Album	Director
1992	"Fuck It All"^{[b]}	—N/a	Jerry Allen
1994	"Davidian"	Burn My Eyes	Sheila Rene
1995	"Old"	Burn My Eyes	Bill Ward
1997	"Ten Ton Hammer"	The More Things Change...	Bill Ward
1998	"Take My Scars"	The More Things Change...	Chris Hafner
1999	"From This Day"	The Burning Red	Michael Martin
2001	"Crashing Around You"	Supercharger	Nathan Cox
2003	"The Blood, The Sweat, The Tears" (Live)	Hellalive	Robb Flynn
2003	"Imperium"	Through the Ashes of Empires	Mike Sloat
2004	"Days Turn Blue to Gray"	Through the Ashes of Empires	Mike Sloat
2007	"Aesthetics of Hate"	The Blackening	Mike Sloat
2007	"Now I Lay Thee Down"	The Blackening	Mike Sloat
2008	"Halo"	The Blackening	Mike Sloat
2008	"Hallowed Be Thy Name"	The Blackening (special edition)	Mike Sloat
2011	"Locust"	Unto the Locust	Mike Sloat
2012	"Darkness Within"	Unto the Locust	Robb Flynn, Milan Basel and Jiří Novotný
2014	"Now We Die"	Bloodstone & Diamonds	Mike Sloat
2015	"Now We Die (live)"	Bloodstone & Diamonds	—
2018	"Catharsis"	Catharsis	Frazier Bradshaw
2018	"Beyond The Pale" (fan contest winner)	Catharsis	Mélanie Gaonac'h
2018	"Bastards" (poetry slam)	Catharsis	Mark Nunez
2018	"Kaleidoscope"	Catharsis	Mike Sloat
2018	"Volatile" (lyric video)	Catharsis	Tommy Antonini
2018	"Volatile" (live in the UK 2018)	Catharsis	Fiaz Farrelly
2018	"Triple Beam" (lyric video)	Catharsis	Tommy Antonini
2019	"Do or Die"	non-album singles	Marius Milinski
2020	"Stop the Bleeding (feat. Killswitch Engage's Jesse Leach)"	non-album singles	Mike Sloat
2020	"My Hands Are Empty"	Of Kingdom and Crown	Mike Sloat
2022	"Choke on the Ashes of Your Hate"	Of Kingdom and Crown	Mike Sloat
2022	"No Gods, No Masters"	Of Kingdom and Crown	Mike Sloat

b. The music video for "Fuck It All" was filmed prior to the recording of Burn My Eyes. It appeared on the album under the title of "Block".
