= The Eighth Plague Tour =

2011–12 concert tour by Machine Head

- Tour by Machine Head
- Associated album: Unto the Locust
- Start date: November 1, 2011
- End date: December 14, 2012
- Legs: Five
- No. of shows: 118; 53 in North America; 58 in Europe; 7 in Australia; 12 cancellations 1 rescheduled

The Eighth Plague Tour was a concert tour by American heavy metal band Machine Head.
Supports in the first leg of Europe was come from the bands Bring Me the Horizon, Devildriver and Darkest Hour. Robb Flynn made a statement saying that: "This will no doubt be the heaviest show you're going to see this year. A lot of the greatest shows of our last touring cycle were in Europe and the UK, so the prospect of this lineup combined with these crowds has us extremely stoked to get out there and tear it up! New material, great venues, killer fans... we absolutely cannot wait!"

The tour continued through North America, with Suicide Silence, Darkest Hour and Rise to Remain, which began on January 15, 2012 in Denver. Machine Head was playing on the 2012's Australian Soundwave Festival.

On January 29, 2012 in Buffalo, New York Machine Head invited a 13-year-old fan onstage to play the song Aesthetics of Hate, from The Blackening album. Anthony Potenza was holding a sign that read "Let This 13-Year-Old Play 'Aesthetics of Hate' With You", and the band took him up on it.

In the summer of 2012, the band was playing at music festivals and headline shows in Europe. Evile supported the band on their two Irish dates. Besides those dates, Machine Head was the opening act for Metallica, on several European dates. In August, the band was playing for the first ever Slipknot's music festival Knotfest.

On August 11, 2012 the band played and Headlined Bloodstock Open Air in England for the first time. The band played a special set commemorating the 20th anniversary of the band's first ever live performance so the fans chose 5 songs from their debut album Burn My Eyes

On September 10, 2012, the band announced a second leg of North American dates. The trek kicked off on October 24 with a "warm up show" in Louisville, Kentucky, 2 massive radio festivals in Orlando and Tampa, Florida, and then with Dethklok on October 30 at The Norva in Norfolk, Virginia and will hit 33 cities before wrapping on December 8 in Atlanta.

For the third time in a row, the corporate powers behind Walt Disney Properties pressured promoter Live Nation into cancelling Machine Head's performance at a House of Blues venue on Disney property, which was the December 4th show in Orlando, Florida. The band said in a statement: "While no one is willing to provide evidence that would prove unfavorable to Disney, sources close to events have suggested that Machine Head remains on a "banned list", and while Dethklok, All That Remains and Black Dahlia Murder will still be allowed to play, the corporate powers at Disney have refused to allow Machine Head to perform."

On November 13, 2012, Machine Head exited their North American tour with Dethklok, All That Remains and Black Dahlia Murder due to matters completely beyond their control. Frontman Robb Flynn needed emergency surgery. Flynn had planned to go under the knife in January after completing the tour as he has been playing through the pain of a double inguinal hernia since the tour started in October. He had hoped to continue the tour despite extreme discomfort, but it became too difficult to continue on. Flynn underwent surgery on Wednesday, November 14 in Minneapolis before returning home to California to recover, rest and recuperate. Machine Head rejoined the tour in Portland, Oregon.

This tour was the last with Adam Duce.

== Tour dates ==
Date	City	Country	Venue
Europe
November 1, 2011	Oslo	Norway	Sentrum Scene
November 3, 2011	Stockholm	Sweden	Fryshuset
November 5, 2011	Tampere	Finland	Tampere-talo
November 6, 2011	Helsinki	Finland	The Circus
November 8, 2011	Copenhagen	Denmark	Amager Bio
November 9, 2011	Hamburg	Germany	Grosse Freiheit 36
November 10, 2011	Dresden	Germany	Alter Schlachthof
November 12, 2011	Vienna	Austria	Gasometer
November 13, 2011	Milan	Italy	Alcatraz
November 15, 2011	Barcelona	Spain	Razzmatazz
November 16, 2011	Madrid	Spain	La Riviera
November 17, 2011	Lisbon	Portugal	Coliseu dos Recreios
November 18, 2011	Porto	Portugal	Coliseu do Porto
November 19, 2011	Bilbao	Spain	Rockstar Live
November 21, 2011	Zurich	Switzerland	Volkshaus
November 23, 2011	Paris	France	Zénith Paris
November 24, 2011	Neu-Isenburg	Germany	Hugenottenhalle
November 25, 2011	Munich	Germany	Tonhalle
November 26, 2011	Ludwigsburg	Germany	Arena Ludwigsburg
November 28, 2011	Tilburg	Netherlands	013
November 29, 2011	Brussels	Belgium	Forest National
November 30, 2011	Oberhausen	Germany	Turbinenhalle
December 1, 2011	Esch-sur-Alzette	Luxembourg	Rockhal
December 3, 2011	London	England	Wembley Arena
December 4, 2011	Birmingham	England	National Indoor Arena
December 5, 2011	Glasgow	Scotland	Scottish Exhibition and Conference Centre
December 6, 2011	Manchester	England	Manchester Central Convention Complex
North America
January 15, 2012	Denver	United States	Summit Music Hall
January 17, 2012	Sauget	United States	Pop's
January 19, 2012	Saint Paul	United States	Station 4
January 20, 2012	Milwaukee	United States	The Rave
January 21, 2012	Royal Oak	United States	Royal Oak Music Theatre
January 22, 2012	Chicago	United States	House of Blues
January 24, 2012	Columbus	United States	Newport Music Hall
January 26, 2012	Portland	United States	State Theatrer
January 27, 2012	Montreal	Canada	Métropolis
January 28, 2012	Toronto	Canada	The Sound Academy
January 29, 2012	Buffalo	United States	Town Ballroom
January 31, 2012	Pittsburgh	United States	Stage AE
February 1, 2012	Baltimore	United States	Rams Head Live!
February 2, 2012	Philadelphia	United States	Trocadero Theatre
February 3, 2012	New York City	United States	Best Buy Theater
February 4, 2012	Worcester	United States	Worcester Palladium
February 6, 2012	Norfolk	United States	Norva Theater
February 7, 2012	Charlotte	United States	The Fillmore Charlotte
February 9, 2012	Atlanta	United States	The Masquerade
February 10, 2012	New Orleans	United States	House of Blues
February 11, 2012	Houston	United States	House of Blues
February 12, 2012	San Antonio	United States	Backstage Live
February 13, 2012	Dallas	United States	House of Blues
February 15, 2012	Farmington	United States	Top Deck
February 16, 2012	Tucson	United States	Rialto Theatre
February 17, 2012	Los Angeles	United States	Avalon
February 18, 2012	San Francisco	United States	The Warfield
Australia ("Soundwave Festival")
February 25, 2012	Brisbane	Australia	RNA Showgrounds
February 26, 2012	Sydney	Australia	Olympic Park
February 28, 2012^{[A]}	Melbourne	Australia	Palace Theater
February 29, 2012^{[A]}	Sydney	Australia	UNSW Roundhouse
March 2, 2012	Melbourne	Australia	Royal Melbourne Showgrounds
March 3, 2012	Adelaide	Australia	Bonython Park
March 5, 2012	Perth	Australia	Claremont Showground
Europe, Leg#2
May 7, 2012^{[B]}	Prague	Czech Republic	Synot Tip Arena
May 8, 2012^{[B]}	Belgrade	Serbia	Ušće Park
May 10, 2012	Warsaw	Poland	Sonisphere Festival
May 13, 2012^{[B]}	Udine	Italy	Stadio Friuli
May 25, 2012	Madrid	Spain	Sonisphere Festival
May 28, 2012	Belfast	Northern Ireland	Ulster Hall
May 30, 2012	Dublin	Ireland	Olympia Theatre
June 1, 2012	Nürburg	Germany	Rock am Ring
June 2, 2012	Nijmegen	Netherlands	Fortarock Festival
June 3, 2012	Nuremberg	Germany	Rock im Park
June 4, 2012	Helsinki	Finland	Sonisphere Festival
June 8, 2012	Leicestershire	England	Download Festival
June 9, 2012	Nickelsdorf	Austria	Nova Rock Festival
June 14, 2012	Stockholm	Sweden	Gröna Lund
June 15, 2012	Gothenburg	Sweden	Metaltown Festival
June 16, 2012	Clisson	France	Hellfest
June 23, 2012	Basel	Switzerland	Earshaker Days Festival
June 24, 2012	Dessel	Belgium	Graspop Metal Meeting
June 29, 2012	Löbnitz	Germany	With Full Force
June 30, 2012	Bucharest	Romania	Rock The City Festival
July 1, 2012	Athens	Greece	Rockwave Festival
July 5, 2012	Roskilde	Denmark	Roskilde Festival
July 7, 2012	Amnéville	France	Sonisphere Festival
July 31, 2012	Osijek	Croatia	Dvorište Vega
August 2, 2012	Székesfehérvár	Hungary	Fezen Festival
August 3, 2012	Kostrzyn nad Odrą	Poland	Przystanek Woodstock
August 4, 2012	Wacken	Germany	Wacken Open Air
August 5, 2012	Lokeren	Belgium	Lokeren Feesten
August 6, 2012	Tolmin	Slovenia	Metalcamp
August 10, 2012	Jaroměř	Czech Republic	Brutal Assault
August 11, 2012	Walton-upon-Trent	England	Bloodstock Open Air
United States
August 17, 2012	Pacific Junction	United States	Knotfest
August 18, 2012	Somerset	United States	Knotfest
North America, Leg#2
October 24, 2012	Louisville	United States	Headliner's
October 26, 2012	Orlando	United States	WJRR Halloweenie Roast
October 27, 2012	Tampa	United States	98ROCK Halloweenie Roast
October 30, 2012	Norfolk	United States	Norva Theatre
October 31, 2012	Philadelphia	United States	Electric Factory
November 2, 2012	Silver Spring	United States	The Fillmore Silver Spring
November 4, 2012	Worcester	United States	Worcester Palladium
November 5, 2012	Montreal	Canada	Métropolis
November 7, 2012	Toronto	Canada	The Sound Academy
November 8, 2012	Pittsburgh	United States	Stage AE
November 9, 2012	Columbus	United States	Lifestyle Communities Pavilion
November 10, 2012	Detroit	United States	The Fillmore Detroit
November 11, 2012	Grand Rapids	United States	The Orbit Room
November 26, 2012	Oakland	United States	Fox Oakland Theatre
November 27, 2012	Los Angeles	United States	Hollywood Palladium
November 28, 2012	Tempe	United States	Marquee Theatre
November 30, 2012	Dallas	United States	House of Blues
December 1, 2012	Austin	United States	Stubb's
December 2, 2012	Houston	United States	House of Blues
December 6, 2012	Chattanooga	United States	Track 29
December 7, 2012	Charlotte	United States	The Fillmore Charlotte
December 8, 2012	Atlanta	United States	The Tabernacle
December 14, 2012	New York City	United States	Roseland Ballroom

- A Headline shows, non Soundwave festival dates.
- B Opening for Metallica.

Canceled and rescheduled dates

November 3, 2012	New York City	Roseland Ballroom	Date rescheduled to December 14, 2012.
November 13, 2012	Fargo	The Venue @ Playmaker's	Date canceled.
November 14, 2012	Saint Paul	Myth	Date canceled.
November 15, 2012	Milwaukee	Eagles Ballroom	Date canceled.
November 16, 2012	Chicago	Aragon Ballroom	Date canceled.
November 17, 2012	Kansas City	The Midland by AMC	Date canceled.
November 18, 2012	Saint Louis	The Pageant	Date canceled.
November 20, 2012	Denver	The Fillmore Auditorium	Date canceled.
November 21, 2012	Salt Lake City	The Great Saltair	Date canceled.
November 23, 2012	Seattle	Showbox at the Market	Date canceled.
November 24, 2012	Portland	Roseland Theatre	Date canceled.
December 4, 2012	Orlando	House of Blues	Date canceled.
December 7–10, 2011	Miami	Mayhem Festival Cruise	Date canceled.

== Setlist ==
Typical

Diary of a Madman (Ozzy Osbourne cover)

1. "I Am Hell (Sonata in C#)"
2. "Be Still and Know"
3. "Imperium"
4. "Beautiful Mourning"
5. "The Blood, the Sweat, the Tears"
6. "Locust"
7. "This Is the End"
8. "Aesthetics of Hate"
9. "Old"
10. "Darkness Within"

Declaration

11. "Bulldozer"
12. "Ten Ton Hammer"
13. "Who We Are"

Encore:

14. "Halo"
15. "Davidian"

== Personnel ==
- Robb Flynn – lead vocals, rhythm guitar
- Adam Duce – bass guitar, backing vocals
- Phil Demmel – lead guitar
- Dave McClain – drums

== Support acts ==
- Bring Me the Horizon (November 1–December 6, 2011)
- Devildriver (November 1–December 6, 2011)
- Darkest Hour (November 1, 2011–February 18, 2012)
- Rise to Remain (January 15–February 18, 2012)
- Suicide Silence (January 15–February 18, 2012)
- Chimaira (February 28–29, 2012)
- Shadows Fall (February 28–29, 2012)
- Times of Grace (February 28–29, 2012)
- Dead Label (May 28–30, 2012)
- Evile (May 28–30, 2012)
- Engel (June 14, 2012)
- All That Remains (October 30–December 8, 2012)
- The Black Dahlia Murder (October 30–December 8, 2012)
- Dethklok [co-headliner] (October 30–December 8, 2012)
