= Elegies (video) =

Video by Machine Head
- Released: October 11, 2005
- Recorded: December 2004 at The Brixton Academy, London
- Genre: Groove metal; thrash metal
- Length: 79:28

Machine Head chronology
Through the Ashes of Empires (2003)	Elegies (2005)	The Blackening (2007)

Professional ratings
Review scores
Source	Rating
metal.de	8/10

Elegies is the second live album by American heavy metal band Machine Head, recorded at the Brixton Academy in London. The concert was recorded in December 2004 and released on DVD on October 11, 2005. As well as the London concert, the DVD also features film clips and a short documentary about the making of Through the Ashes of Empires.

== Track listing ==
No.	Title	Writer(s)	Length
1.	"Intro" ("Ave Satani")	Jerry Goldsmith	2:53
2.	"Imperium"	Robb Flynn, Dave McClain	5:52
3.	"Seasons Wither"	Robb Flynn, Phil Demmel, Adam Duce	6:18
4.	"Old"	Robb Flynn, Logan Mader, Adam Duce, Chris Kontos	4:35
5.	"Bulldozer"	Robb Flynn, Ahrue Luster, Adam Duce, Dave McClain	5:21
6.	"Days Turn Blue to Gray"	Robb Flynn, Phil Demmel	5:22
7.	"The Blood, the Sweat, the Tears"	Robb Flynn, Ahrue Luster, Adam Duce, Dave McClain	4:04
8.	"Ten Ton Hammer"	Robb Flynn, Logan Mader, Adam Duce, Dave McClain	4:28
9.	"The Burning Red"	Robb Flynn, Ahrue Luster, Adam Duce, Dave McClain	6:05
10.	"In the Presence of My Enemies"	Robb Flynn, Phil Demmel	7:59
11.	"Take My Scars"	Robb Flynn, Logan Mader, Adam Duce, Dave McClain	6:03
12.	"Descend the Shades of Night"	Robb Flynn, Dave McClain	6:56
13.	"Davidian"	Robb Flynn, Logan Mader, Adam Duce, Chris Kontos	5:26
14.	"Block"	Robb Flynn, Logan Mader, Adam Duce, Chris Kontos	8:10
