= Machine Fucking Head Live =

Live album by Machine Head
- Released: November 13, 2012
- Genre: Groove metal; thrash metal
- Length: 100:36
- Label: Roadrunner

Machine Head chronology
Unto the Locust (2011)	Machine Fucking Head Live (2012)	Bloodstone & Diamonds (2014)

Professional ratings
Review scores
Source	Rating
AllMusic	3.5/5 stars

Machine Fucking Head Live is the third live album by American heavy metal band Machine Head. It was released on November 13, 2012, under Roadrunner Records. It is the final release to include bassist Adam Duce who left the band in early 2013. The album was recorded at Central, Manchester on December 6, 2011 (except Locust & Halo recorded at SECC, Glasgow on December 5, 2011).

Frontman Robb Flynn said, "The Head Cases [Machine Head's nickname for their fans] have been so intense on this tour cycle that we had to start capturing the shows, especially with technology making it so much easier to record". "We culled some of the best nights where the band and crowd were on fire and made a badass, nearly two-hour, double live album, which is a great documentation of where the band is at, 18 years deep."

== Track listing ==
No.	Title	Length
1.	"I Am Hell (Sonata in C#)"	9:21
2.	"Be Still and Know"	5:55
3.	"Imperium"	6:41
4.	"Beautiful Mourning"	5:13
5.	"The Blood, the Sweat, the Tears"	5:29
6.	"Locust"	7:39
7.	"This Is the End"	6:43
8.	"Aesthetics of Hate"	6:09
9.	"Old"	4:53
10.	"Darkness Within"	8:12
11.	"Bulldozer"	5:46
12.	"Ten Ton Hammer"	4:55
13.	"Who We Are"	7:29
14.	"Halo"	9:27
15.	"Davidian"	6:44

Digital deluxe edition
No.	Title	Length
16.	"Alan's on Fire" (Poison Idea cover)	3:59
17.	"My Misery"	4:38
18.	"Locust [Demo 2011]"	7:29
19.	"This Is the End [Demo 2011]"	6:14

Digital EP (B-sides and rarities)
No.	Title	Length
1.	"Negative Creep" (Nirvana cover)	2:41
2.	"The Possibility of Life's Destruction" (Discharge cover)	1:27
3.	"Hole in the Sky" (Black Sabbath cover)	3:33
4.	"Locust (My Name Is Purity) [Demo 2011]"	7:14
5.	"Be Still and Know (Can We Be Reborn) [Demo 2011]"	5:50
6.	"I Am Hell (Sonata in C#) [Alt Vocals] [Demo 2011]"	8:10

== Personnel ==
Machine Head

- Robb Flynn – lead vocals, rhythm guitar
- Phil Demmel – lead guitar, backing vocals
- Adam Duce – bass, backing vocals
- Dave McClain – drums

== Charts ==
Chart (2001)	Peak position
Australian Albums (ARIA)	15
Austrian Albums (Ö3 Austria)	56
Belgian Albums (Ultratop Flanders)	110
Belgian Albums (Ultratop Wallonia)	124
French Albums (SNEP)	115
German Albums (Offizielle Top 100)	62
