= Hellalive =

Live album by Machine Head
- Released: March 11, 2003
- Recorded: December 8, 2001, at Brixton Academy, London; July 7, 2002, at With Full Force festival ("None But My Own", "The Burning Red")
- Genre: Groove metal; thrash metal; nu metal
- Length: 77:36
- Label: Roadrunner
- Producer: Machine Head

Machine Head chronology
Supercharger (2001)	Hellalive (2003)	Through the Ashes of Empires (2003)

Professional ratings
Review scores
Source	Rating
AllMusic	2.5/5 stars

Hellalive is the first live album by American heavy metal band Machine Head.

The album was released to fulfill Machine Head's commitment to Roadrunner Records (the band released Through the Ashes of Empires shortly after). Former Vio-lence guitarist Phil Demmel is present on "None But My Own" and "The Burning Red", in place of Ahrue Luster, due to these songs being taken from 2002's Full Force Festival and by that time Luster had left the band. Demmel filled in, as is credited in the liner notes to "Hellalive" and he later joined the band as permanent lead guitarist. As of 2012 the album has sold over 38,000 copies in the United States and an estimated 78,000 copies worldwide since its 2003 release.

In a retrospective, Robb Flynn noted that Adam Duce originally suggested the title "Let's Roll", in reference to the phrase's use on United Airlines Flight 93, but eventually named it "Hellalive" as a double entendre for "hell alive" and "hella live", which Flynn in hindsight called "idiotic" and nonsensical.

== Track listing ==
All lyrics are written by Robb Flynn, except "Supercharger" (by Flynn and Adam Duce); all music is composed by Machine Head, except where noted.

No.	Title	Music	Original album	Length
1.	"Bulldozer"	(Note: Originally credited to Robb Flynn)	Supercharger (2001)	5:01
2.	"The Blood, the Sweat, the Tears"	Ahrue Luster; Flynn (Note: Originally credited to Machine Head)	The Burning Red (1999)	4:16
3.	"Ten Ton Hammer"		The More Things Change... (1997)	5:01
4.	"Old"		Burn My Eyes (1994)	4:59
5.	"Crashing Around You"		Supercharger (2001)	4:59
6.	"Take My Scars"		The More Things Change... (1997)	5:04
7.	"I'm Your God Now"		Burn My Eyes (1994)	6:22
8.	"None But My Own"		Burn My Eyes (1994)	7:16
9.	"From This Day"	Flynn; Dave McClain; Luster	The Burning Red (1999)	5:09
10.	"American High"	Flynn; McClain; Luster	Supercharger (2001)	3:34
11.	"Nothing Left"	Flynn; McClain	The Burning Red (1999)	5:33
12.	"The Burning Red"		The Burning Red (1999)	6:09
13.	"Davidian"		Burn My Eyes (1994)	6:00
14.	"Supercharger"	Flynn; McClain	Supercharger (2001)	7:35
Total length:				77:36

== Machine Head ==
- Robb Flynn – vocals, guitar
- Adam Duce – bass
- Dave McClain – drums
- Ahrue Luster – guitar (tracks 1–7, 9–11, 13 and 14)
- Phil Demmel – guitar (tracks 8 and 12 only)

== Chart positions ==
Chart (2003)	Peak position
French Albums Chart	78
UK Albums Chart	143
