= The Black Procession =

Live album by Machine Head
- Released: April 16, 2011
- Genre: Thrash metal; groove metal
- Length: 17:36
- Label: Roadrunner
- Producer: Machine Head

Machine Head chronology
The Blackening (2007)	The Black Procession (2011)	Unto the Locust (2011)

The Black Procession is a live EP by American heavy metal band Machine Head, released on April 16, 2011. The record is a limited 10" vinyl that features three previously unreleased live tracks that were recorded during 2010's Black Procession Tour in support of the band's last studio effort, The Blackening. The record was released to celebrate Record Store Day.

== Track listing ==
Side A
No.	Title	Writer(s)	Length
1.	"Beautiful Mourning" (live)	Flynn/Demmel	5:06
2.	"Bite the Bullet" (live)	Flynn	3:29

Side B
No.	Title	Writer(s)	Length
3.	"Halo" (live)	Flynn/McClain/Duce/Demmel	9:01

== Personnel ==
- Robb Flynn – vocals, guitars
- Phil Demmel – guitars, vocals
- Adam Duce – bass, vocals
- Dave McClain – drums
