= Days Turn Blue to Gray =

Single by Machine Head

from the album Through the Ashes of Empires
- Released: 2004
- Genre: Groove metal
- Length: 5:29 (album version); 4:25 (single version)
- Label: Roadrunner
- Songwriters: Robb Flynn, Dave McClain and Phil Demmel

Machine Head singles chronology
"Imperium" (2003)	"Days Turn Blue to Gray" (2004)	"Aesthetics of Hate" (2007)

Music video
- "Days Turn Blue to Gray" on YouTube

"Days Turn Blue to Gray" is a song by American heavy metal band Machine Head from the album Through the Ashes of Empires. It was released as a single in 2004.

== Details ==
The single was only made available through mail order from the UK or at Machine Head gigs during their 2004 UK tour. "Seasons Wither" was previously not available outside of North America. "The Rage to Overcome" was played at the 10th anniversary show of Burn My Eyes in Philadelphia, Pennsylvania, for the first time in over five years.

== Track listing ==
=== UK CDs ===
1. "Days Turn Blue to Gray" – 4:25
2. "Seasons Wither" – 6:14
3. "The Rage to Overcome" (Live) – 4:45

=== UK 7" vinyl ===
1. "Days Turn Blue to Gray" – 5:29
2. "Seasons Wither" – 6:14

=== UK promo ===
1. "Days Turn Blue to Gray" – 4:25
2. "Seasons Wither" (Edit) – 6:14

== Personnel ==
- Robb Flynn – lead vocals, rhythm guitar
- Adam Duce – bass, backing vocals
- Dave McClain – drums
- Phil Demmel – lead guitar

== Charts ==
Chart (2004)	Peak position
Scottish Singles Sales (Official Charts)	95
UK Singles (Official Charts)	77
UK Rock & Metal (Official Charts)	3
