= Catharsis (Machine Head album) =

Studio album by Machine Head
- Released: January 26, 2018
- Studios: Sharkbite Studios, Oakland, California
- Genres: Groove metal; nu metal; alternative metal
- Length: 74:26
- Label: Nuclear Blast
- Producers: Robb Flynn; Zack Ohren

Machine Head chronology
Bloodstone & Diamonds (2014)	Catharsis (2018)	Of Kingdom and Crown (2022)

Catharsis is the ninth studio album by American heavy metal band Machine Head, released on January 26, 2018. The album is the first to be credited as completely co-written by all of the band's members since The More Things Change... (1997). Catharsis saw the band stylistically returning to the nu metal-inspired sound that was featured on their third and fourth album respectively, The Burning Red (1999) and Supercharger (2001). Catharsis is the final Machine Head studio album to feature drummer Dave McClain and lead guitarist Phil Demmel, who both left the band in late September 2018, over their dislike with the album's direction and conflicts with Robb Flynn.

At 74 minutes, Catharsis is Machine Head's longest album.

== Musical style ==
In November 2017, frontman Robb Flynn explained that the album's sound would be less heavy than previous efforts, with emphasis on being "very grooving and very melodic". As a result, the songs are more structurally simplistic as well as being shorter, an approach that Flynn also tried to incorporate into the lyrics, finding hip-hop and hardcore punk as influences:

I don't listen to a whole lot of metal — I'm being straight with you. To me, a lot of it doesn't interest me, a lot of the lyrics don't interest me. I listen to a lot of hip-hop. I grew up on a lot of hardcore, punk rock, hip-hop, and I just love... Love it or hate it, I love just the fucking direct, ignorant-ass lyrics of hip-hop. It's very clear, it's very blunt; there's no metaphors. Metal's full of metaphors. We've been singing about the same shit now for 30 fucking years and I get a little bored with it. And with this record, I really wanted to just strip it down and make really clear, really simple, really blunt... Especially my choruses, just really clear... Like, you know what the fuck I'm talking about exactly when I'm talking about it. And it's cool. Like real vulgar language and coarse language, and it's a good vibe, man.

The song "Beyond the Pale" was met with minor controversy when it was pointed out that the main riff bears similarities to the main riff in Strapping Young Lad's "Love?". Former Strapping Young Lad frontman Devin Townsend acknowledged the similarities, but stated that "Love?"'s chorus was "ripped off" from the song "City of Love" by Yes; Flynn also joked that "The 'riff police' pulled me over", and that while admitting to the similarities, he claimed it was "just a happy accident".

In February 2019, former guitarist Phil Demmel said that he hated the direction of Catharsis in an interview with the "Talk Toomey" podcast, explaining:

There's moments of what I wrote that I like. I wrote most of the music to "California Bleeding", but then [Flynn] wrote the lyrics on top of it that I just wish that… Me and Dave [McClain, drums] talk about it, like, 'Fuck! I wish I could take my riffs back.' [Laughs] 'No, that isn't what we want them used for.' So, I think, in that sense, it just became a Robb Flynn solo project, and that isn't what I signed up for.

== Reception ==
Professional ratings
Review scores
Source	Rating
Angry Metal Guy	1.5/5
Blabbermouth.net	5.5/10
Consequence of Sound	C−
Exclaim!	5/10
Kerrang!	3/5 stars
Louder than War	7.5/10
Metal Hammer	7/10
Metal Storm	3.0/10
Brave Words & Bloody Knuckles	6.5/10
Rock Hard	8.5/10

Critical reception of the album was mixed. In a review by Jay H. Gorania for Blabbermouth.net he wrote, "Catharsis is a bold move. It's just the wrong move. That's what's most disappointing and frustrating here: The wasted potential of what could have been." Writing for Loudwire, Chad Bowar wrote, "There's a regular album length's worth of excellent songs, but the quality of Catharsis is diluted by that other 30 minutes or so and hampered by a lack of cohesiveness." In a positive review for Metal Hammer, Eleanor Goodman wrote, "Catharsis is Machine Head with the brakes off, freewheeling through past and present as they see fit," and "Robb's said he's got no plan for Machine Head's future, and perhaps that's why the record lacks some coherence, but their rebellious spirit nevertheless remains strong." By contrast, Jeff Treppel of Decibel Magazine gave the album a "shrug emoji" out of 10, calling it "a 74-minute rap metal album with a song that sounds like the Dropkick Murphys in the middle," and that "none of it feels half-assed; these are clearly well-crafted songs. It's all just so stupid... this is a Super Collider-level miss from a band that seemed to have ditched this phase long ago"; the review resulted in a back-and-forth between the band and the magazine.

Catharsis would go on to become Machine Head's best international chart debut, debuting at number three in Germany, number 10 in Australia, and number 12 in the UK.

Former guitarist Phil Demmel, who played on the record, has publicly admitted his distaste for the album in many interviews after he left the band.

A significant proportion of the band's fanbase reacted negatively to the album online. As a result, Robb Flynn responded to the criticism in his single "Do or Die", released in 2019.

== Track listing ==
All lyrics are written by Robb Flynn; all music is composed by Flynn, Dave McClain, Phil Demmel and Jared MacEachern.

No.	Title	Length
1.	"Volatile"	4:39
2.	"Catharsis"	6:11
3.	"Beyond the Pale"	4:31
4.	"California Bleeding"	4:12
5.	"Triple Beam"	4:41
6.	"Kaleidoscope"	4:04
7.	"Bastards"	5:04
8.	"Hope Begets Hope"	4:30
9.	"Screaming at the Sun"	3:55
10.	"Behind a Mask"	4:07
11.	"Heavy Lies the Crown"	8:49
12.	"Psychotic"	5:02
13.	"Grind You Down"	4:07
14.	"Razorblade Smile"	4:00
15.	"Eulogy"	6:34
Total length:		74:26

== Personnel ==
Machine Head

- Robb Flynn – lead vocals, rhythm guitar
- Phil Demmel – lead guitar
- Jared MacEachern – bass, backing vocals
- Dave McClain – drums

Additional musicians

- Phillip Brezina – violin on "Catharsis", "Kaleidoscope" and "Heavy Lies the Crown"
- Charles Akert – viola on "Catharsis", "Kaleidoscope" and "Heavy Lies the Crown"
- Ivo Bukolic – cello on "Catharsis", "Kaleidoscope" and "Heavy Lies the Crown"

Production and design

- Robb Flynn – production, mixing
- Zack Ohren – production, mixing
- Ted Jensen – mastering
- Joel Wanasek – post-production
- Jordan Fish – post-production
- Rhys Fulber – post-production
- Seanen Middleton – cover photography
- Gustavo Sazes – lyric design, package layout
- Travis Shinn – band photography

== Charts ==
Chart (2018)	Peak position
Australian Albums (ARIA)	10
Austrian Albums (Ö3 Austria)	3
Belgian Albums (Ultratop Flanders)	16
Belgian Albums (Ultratop Wallonia)	25
Canadian Albums (Billboard)	38
Czech Albums (ČNS IFPI)	19
Dutch Albums (Album Top 100)	41
Finnish Albums (Suomen virallinen lista)	11
German Albums (Offizielle Top 100)	3
Hungarian Albums (MAHASZ)	21
Italian Albums (FIMI)	52
New Zealand Heatseeker Albums (RMNZ)	6
Polish Albums (ZPAV)	21
Portuguese Albums (AFP)	11
Scottish Albums (Official Charts)	5
Spanish Albums (PROMUSICAE)	25
Swiss Albums (Schweizer Hitparade)	4
UK Albums (Official Charts)	12
US Billboard 200	65
