= Crashing Around You =

Single by Machine Head

from the album Supercharger
- Released: September 2001
- Recorded: Indigo Ranch Studios
- Genre: Nu metal
- Length: 3:17
- Label: Roadrunner
- Songwriter: Robb Flynn
- Producer: Johnny K

Machine Head singles chronology
"The Blood, the Sweat, the Tears" (2000)	"Crashing Around You" (2001)	"Imperium" (2003)

Music video
- "Crashing Around You" on YouTube

"Crashing Around You" is a song by American heavy metal band Machine Head from their album Supercharger. It was released as a single in September 2001 and is also available on the band's live album Hellalive and the second Fast and the Furious soundtrack More Fast and Furious. The single's release was ill-timed, coming out shortly before the 9/11 terrorist attacks.

In 2019, Joe Smith-Engelhardt of Alternative Press included the song in his list of "Top 10 nü-metal staples that still hold up today".

== Music video ==
The video was released just barely before the 9/11 terrorist attacks. The imagery in the video focused around a disturbed man in a small room and the band playing in front of a backdrop which switches back and forth between a city skyline and flames, with the flames superimposed over the skyline towards the end of the video. In fear that this could be viewed as insensitive after the tragic 9/11 attacks, the music video was subsequently banned from MTV due to its depiction of falling buildings. The video can be seen as an enhanced feature on the actual single and on YouTube.

== Track listing ==
All lyrics are written by Robb Flynn.

UK single
No.	Title	Music	Length
1.	"Crashing Around You"	Flynn	3:17
2.	"Silver" (Live)	Flynn, Ahrue Luster	4:28
3.	"Ten Ton Hammer" (Live)	Flynn, Logan Mader, Adam Duce, Dave McClain	5:06

Promo single
No.	Title	Music	Length
1.	"Crashing Around You"	Flynn	3:13

== Charts ==
Chart (2001)	Peak position
UK Singles (OCC)	89
UK Rock & Metal (OCC)	12
