= From This Day =

Single by Machine Head

from the album The Burning Red
- Released: October 31, 1999
- Recorded: 1998–1999 at Indigo Ranch Studios in Malibu, California, U.S.
- Genre: Nu metal; rap metal
- Length: 3:53 (album version); 3:07 (single version)
- Label: Roadrunner
- Songwriters: Robb Flynn, Dave McClain, Ahrue Luster
- Producer: Ross Robinson

Machine Head singles chronology
"Take My Scars" (1997)	"From This Day" (1999)	"The Blood, the Sweat, the Tears" (2000)

Music video
- "From This Day" on YouTube

"From This Day" is a song by American heavy metal band Machine Head from the album The Burning Red. It was released as a single on October 31, 1999, and is also featured on the band's live album Hellalive.

== Music video ==
The music video was directed by Michael Martin.

In retrospect, Robb Flynn has been ambivalent about the video, saying "me dressed up as like an orange-juice-box in the “From This Day” video is definitely one of those “what-the-fuck-was-I-thinking” moments". Guitarist Ahrue Luster would later admit that the infamous orange jacket Flynn was wearing was actually his, but he gave it to Flynn after he didn't like the fit of it.

In 2018, the staff of Metal Hammer included the video in the site's list of "the 13 best nu metal videos".

== Track listing ==
=== Card sleeve promo ===
1. "From This Day" (single version) – 3:07
2. "From This Day" (album version) – 3:53
3. "Call-Out Hook – 0:12

=== European edition ===
1. "From This Day" (single version) – 3:07
2. "Alcoholocaust" – 3:42
3. "House of Suffering" (Bad Brains cover) – 2:09

=== Japanese edition ===
1. "From This Day" – 3:55
2. "Desire to Fire" (Live) – 4:39
3. "The Blood, the Sweat, the Tears" (Live) – 4:35
4. "From This Day" (Live) – 4:29

=== Promo white card sleeve ===
1. "From This Day" (single version) – 3:07
2. "From This Day" (album version) – 3:53
3. "Call-Out Hook – 0:12

== Charts ==
Chart (1999)	Peak position
Scotland Singles (OCC)	74
UK Singles (OCC)	74
UK Rock & Metal (OCC)	1
