= Through the Ashes of Empires =

Studio album by Machine Head
- Released: October 27, 2003
- Recorded: June 16 – July 21, 2003
- Studio: Sharkbite Studios, Oakland, California
- Genre: Groove metal; thrash metal
- Length: 59:57
- Label: Roadrunner
- Producer: Robb Flynn

Machine Head chronology
Hellalive (2003)	Through the Ashes of Empires (2003)	Elegies (2005)

Singles from Through the Ashes of Empires
- 1. "Imperium" Released: December 16, 2003; 2. "Days Turn Blue to Gray" Released: 2004

Through the Ashes of Empires is the fifth studio album by American heavy metal band Machine Head. On this album, the band returned to their groove/thrash metal sound that was featured on their debut album Burn My Eyes (1994) and their second album The More Things Change... (1997) after experimenting with the nu metal genre featured on their previous two albums. It was released in the UK, Europe and Australia on the Roadrunner Records International label on October 27, 2003. At this stage, Machine Head still did not have an American record deal, having parted ways with Roadrunner Records US after the Supercharger album was released. Through The Ashes of Empires was such a success that Roadrunner Records US, in an unprecedented move, quickly offered Machine Head a new contract and the album finally reached North America on April 20, 2004. This album was also the first album to feature guitarist Phil Demmel, who would stay with the band until his departure in 2018.

On December 9, 2011, the album was certified Silver by the British Phonographic Industry and it has sold just under 80,000 copies in the UK.

== Background ==
Because guitarist Ahrue Luster had left the band due to creative differences, the album was written by the remaining three band members, with then-temporary guitarist Phil Demmel only joining in for the recording sessions. When asked about the writing process for the album, vocalist and guitarist Robb Flynn said:

"...when Ahrue quit MH to go join Nickelback wannabes Juggernaut, we made a decision to start writing as a three-piece. We didn't want to go through the whole 'try out' process, and see if some new guy would fit."

A special edition of the album was also released, containing a second disc with early demo recordings of songs from the album, as well as a short video of Machine Head in the studio during the recording of the album. The band discusses the gear used to record it, as well as various issues relating to it.

Machine Head recorded the album from June 16 to July 21, 2003. The band then travelled to England to mix the album with Colin Richardson at the start of August. The album's was supposed to be mastered on August 15; as mixing took longer than expected, it was instead mastered on August 31, 2003.

The band recorded an additional song, "Seasons Wither", for the North American release of the album as a measure of compensation for the American fans for having to wait so long; it was subsequently released internationally as a B-side on the "Days Turn Blue to Gray" single. According to guitarist Demmel, the song also gives an indication of the direction the band would take with their next album, The Blackening.

In 2013, Robb Flynn released a demo for the unused track "Pins and Needles", which the band rejected for being "one of the worst songs [Flynn has] ever written when it comes to [his] vocals and vocal ideas". Despite the group's negativity towards the demo, it would later be rewritten to become the Roadrunner United track "Army of the Sun" with Tim Williams from Vision of Disorder on vocals.

The album can be considered an encapsulation of the band at that point, stylistically concompassing all four of their previous works. It has the melodicism of The Burning Red and Supercharger, the darker, heavier groove of The More Things Change and the sheer aggression of Burn My Eyes. Lyrically, the album is rooted in stories of personal struggles, triumphs, morbidity, and abuse.

The album has since proven to be a success with critics, music charts and fans. The album has been well-embraced as an excellent return to form both musically and lyrically. The difficult circumstances under which the album was recorded was documented on their concert DVD Elegies.

== Critical reception ==
Professional ratings
Review scores
Source	Rating
AllMusic	4/5 stars
Blabbermouth.net	8/10
Collector's Guide to Heavy Metal	7/10
The Encyclopedia of Popular Music	3/5 stars
Kerrang!	2/5 stars
Metal.de	10/10
Rock Hard	9.5/10

The album received positive reviews and was a commercial success. In 2005, Through the Ashes of Empires was ranked number 311 in Rock Hard magazine's book of The 500 Greatest Rock & Metal Albums of All Time.

== Track listing ==
No.	Title	Lyrics	Music	Length
1.	"Imperium"	Robb Flynn	Robb Flynn, Dave McClain	6:41
2.	"Bite the Bullet"	Flynn	Flynn	3:21
3.	"Left Unfinished"	Flynn	Flynn	5:45
4.	"Elegy"	Flynn	Flynn, McClain	3:55
5.	"In the Presence of My Enemies"	Flynn	Flynn, Phil Demmel	7:07
6.	"Days Turn Blue to Gray"	Flynn	Flynn, Demmel	5:29
7.	"Vim"	Flynn, Adam Duce	Flynn, McClain	5:12
8.	"Seasons Wither"	Flynn, Adam Duce	Flynn, Demmel	6:18
9.	"All Falls Down"	Flynn	Flynn, McClain	4:29
10.	"Wipe the Tears"	Flynn, Duce	Flynn, McClain	3:54
11.	"Descend the Shades of Night"	Flynn	Flynn, McClain	7:46

"Seasons Wither" did not appear on the original worldwide release, but was added to the US release to make up for the delayed release; in this edition, the song appears between "Vim" and "All Falls Down".

Bonus disc
No.	Title	Length
1.	"Bite the Bullet" (Demo)	3:51
2.	"Left Unfinished" (Demo)	4:30
3.	"Elegy" (Demo)	3:46
4.	"All Falls Down" (Demo)	4:29
5.	"Descend the Shades of Night" (Demo)	3:55
6.	"The Blood, the Sweat, the Tears (Live)" (Video)	4:16
7.	"Through the Ashes of Empires Sessions" (Video)	18:30

== Personnel ==
- Robb Flynn – lead vocals, rhythm guitar, guitar solo on "Left Unfinished", second guitar solo on "Vim"
- Adam Duce – bass, backing vocals
- Phil Demmel – lead guitar
- Dave McClain – drums

== Charts ==
Chart (2003)	Peak position
Australian Albums Chart	91
Austrian Albums Chart	56
Dutch Albums Chart	65
French Albums Chart	44
German Albums Chart	24
Swedish Albums Chart	41
Swiss Albums Chart	80
UK Album Chart	77
US Billboard 200	88

== Certifications ==
Region	Certification	Certified units/sales
United Kingdom (BPI)	Silver	60,000^{^}
^{^} Shipments figures based on certification alone.
