= Take My Scars =

Single by Machine Head

from the album The More Things Change...
- Released: November 24, 1997
- Studio: The Plant (Sausalito); Hyde Street (San Francisco)
- Genre: Groove metal
- Length: 4:24
- Label: Roadrunner
- Songwriters: Adam Duce, Robb Flynn, Dave McClain, and Logan Mader
- Producer: Colin Richardson

Machine Head singles chronology
"Ten Ton Hammer" (1997)	"Take My Scars" (1997)	"From This Day" (1999)

Music video
- "Take My Scars" on YouTube

"Take My Scars" is a song by American heavy metal band Machine Head from the album The More Things Change.... It was released as a single on November 24, 1997 and is also available on the band's live album Hellalive. The song is sung from the viewpoint of the Devil.

"Take My Scars" was featured on the soundtrack of the 2000 film Faust: Love of the Damned.

== Track listing ==
=== Digipack version ===
1. "Take My Scars" – 4:21
2. "Negative Creep" (Nirvana cover) – 2:40
3. "Ten Ton Hammer" (Demo version) – 5:01
4. "Struck a Nerve" (Demo version) – 3:35

=== Slimcase version ===
1. "Take My Scars" – 4:21
2. "Negative Creep" (Nirvana cover) – 2:40
3. "Take My Scars" (Live) – 4:24
4. "Blood for Blood" (Live) – 3:55

=== Japanese EP version ===
1. "Take My Scars" – 5:24
2. "Negative Creep" (Nirvana Cover) – 2:40
3. "Ten Ton Hammer" (Demo version) – 4:55
4. "Struck a Nerve" (Demo version) – 3:35
5. "Take My Scars" (Live) – 4:26
6. "Struck a Nerve" (Live) – 4:10
7. "A Thousand Lies" (Live) – 7:14
8. "Blood for Blood" (Live) – 4:14
9. "Violate" (Live) – 7:31

== Charts ==
Chart (1997)	Peak position
Scotland Singles (OCC)	66
UK Singles (OCC)	73
UK Rock & Metal (OCC)	2
