= Bloodstone & Diamonds =

Studio album by Machine Head
- Released: November 7, 2014
- Recorded: 2014
- Studios: Jingletown (California); Top Floor (Gothenburg, Sweden) (additional recording)
- Genres: Groove metal; thrash metal
- Length: 70:59
- Label: Nuclear Blast
- Producers: Robb Flynn; Juan Urteaga

Machine Head chronology
Machine Fucking Head Live (2012)	Bloodstone & Diamonds (2014)	Catharsis (2018)

Singles from Bloodstone & Diamonds
- 1. "Killers & Kings" Released: April 29, 2014; 2. "Now We Die" Released: September 26, 2014

Bloodstone & Diamonds is the eighth studio album by American heavy metal band Machine Head, released via Nuclear Blast on November 7, 2014. It is the first album to feature Jared MacEachern who replaced founding bassist Adam Duce in 2013. Although the album does not have a title track, the album gets its name from a lyric from "Now We Die".

"Sail into the Black" was featured in the video package for the triple threat match between Seth Rollins, Roman Reigns and CM Punk in Night 1 of Wrestlemania 41.

== Background ==
The album was once again mixed by Colin Richardson with additional tracking, editing, and mixing by Andy Sneap and Steve Lagudi. All album art was done by Travis Shinn. It is the band's first album not to be released on Roadrunner Records.

== Lyrics and themes ==
Like with previous Machine Head releases, the album's lyrics detail political and social themes, particularly civil unrest, dissatisfaction and injustice, often with violent conclusions. The song "Night of Long Knives" is not about the Röhm-Putsch, but instead the Manson Family murders in Hollywood in 1969.

"Imaginal Cells" is an instrumental featuring samples from the audiobook Spontaneous Evolution by Dr. Bruce Lipton and Steve Bhaerman.

== Reception ==
Professional ratings
Aggregate scores
Source	Rating
Metacritic	96/100
Review scores
Source	Rating
AllMusic	4/5 stars
Blabbermouth.net	9/10
Classic Rock	4.5/5 stars
Exclaim!	7/10
The Guardian	5/5 stars
Metal Hammer	4/5 stars
Rock Sound	8/10
The Skinny	4/5 stars

According to the review aggregator Metacritic, Bloodstone & Diamonds received "universal acclaim" based on a weighted average score of 96 out of 100 from 5 critic scores. Dom Lawson of The Guardian wrote "Striking an exquisite balance between brute force, insistent melody and bold experimentation, this is the finest mainstream metal album of 2014 by a huge margin." In the first week of release, the album debuted at No. 21 on the Billboard 200 chart, becoming the band's highest-charting album ever.

== Track listing ==
No.	Title	Lyrics	Music	Length
1.	"Now We Die"	Flynn	Flynn; Demmel	7:10
2.	"Killers & Kings"	Flynn	Demmel; Flynn	4:32
3.	"Ghosts Will Haunt My Bones"	Flynn; Demmel; MacEachern	Flynn; Demmel; MacEachern; McClain	6:06
4.	"Night of Long Knives"	Flynn	Flynn	6:48
5.	"Sail into the Black"	Flynn; Demmel	Flynn; Demmel; McClain	8:29
6.	"Eyes of the Dead"	Flynn	Flynn	6:25
7.	"Beneath the Silt"	Flynn	Flynn	4:43
8.	"In Comes the Flood"	Flynn; MacEachern	Flynn	7:22
9.	"Damage Inside"	Flynn	McClain	3:24
10.	"Game Over"	Flynn	Flynn; Demmel	6:36
11.	"Imaginal Cells" (instrumental)		Demmel; Flynn	3:36
12.	"Take Me Through the Fire"	Flynn; Demmel	Demmel; Flynn	5:48

== Personnel ==
=== Machine Head ===
- Robb Flynn – lead vocals, rhythm guitar, keyboards (tracks 1, 3, 5, 8), string arrangement (1, 5, 8), percussion (5)
- Phil Demmel – lead guitar
- Jared MacEachern – bass, backing vocals
- Dave McClain – drums, additional guitar (track 9)

=== Additional personnel ===
- Rhys Fulber – keyboards & string arrangement (tracks 1, 5), percussion (5)
- Jordan Fish – keyboards (tracks 3, 8, 9), string arrangement (8)
- Kathryn Marshall, Eugenia Wie, Chad Kaltinger and Vanessa Ruotolo – strings (track 1)
- Phillip Brezina, Charles Akert and Ivo Bukolic – strings (track 8)

=== Production ===
- Andy Sneap – tracking, editing
- Colin Richardson – mixing
- Juan Urteaga – production, engineering
- Lee Bothwick – engineering
- Steve Lagudi – engineering
- Ted Jensen – mastering
- Strephon Taylor – design, layout

== Charts ==
Chart (2014)	Peak position
Australian Albums (ARIA)	10
Austrian Albums (Ö3 Austria)	6
Belgian Albums (Ultratop Flanders)	33
Belgian Albums (Ultratop Wallonia)	35
Canadian Albums (Billboard)	25
Danish Albums (Hitlisten)	39
Dutch Albums (Album Top 100)	38
Finnish Albums (Suomen virallinen lista)	18
French Albums (SNEP)	35
German Albums (Offizielle Top 100)	9
Hungarian Albums (MAHASZ)	27
Irish Albums (IRMA)	32
Italian Albums (FIMI)	81
Japanese Albums (Oricon)	67
South Korean Albums (Circle)	99
South Korean International Albums (Circle)	22
New Zealand Albums (RMNZ)	38
Norwegian Albums (VG-lista)	31
Scottish Albums (Official Charts)	18
Spanish Albums (Promusicae)	63
Swedish Albums (Sverigetopplistan)	31
Swiss Albums (Schweizer Hitparade)	7
UK Albums (Official Charts)	18
UK Independent Albums (Official Charts)	1
UK Rock & Metal Albums (Official Charts)	3
US Billboard 200	21
US Digital Albums (Billboard)	19
US Independent Albums (Billboard)	2
US Top Hard Rock Albums (Billboard)	2
US Top Rock Albums (Billboard)	4
US Indie Store Album Sales (Billboard)	10
