= Aesthetics of Hate =

Single by Machine Head

from the album The Blackening
- Released: March 27, 2007
- Recorded: 2006
- Genre: Thrash metal
- Length: 6:35 (album version); 5:29 (music video version)
- Label: Roadrunner
- Songwriters: Robb Flynn, Adam Duce
- Producer: Robb Flynn

Machine Head singles chronology
"Days Turn Blue to Gray" (2004)	"Aesthetics of Hate" (2007)	"Now I Lay Thee Down" (2007)

Music video
- "Aesthetics of Hate" on YouTube

Audio
- "Aesthetics of Hate" on YouTube

"Aesthetics of Hate" is a song by American heavy metal band Machine Head from their 2007 studio album, The Blackening. Written by vocalist and guitarist Robb Flynn, the song is a retaliation to an article written by William Grim. Grim wrote that late guitarist Dimebag Darrell was "an ignorant, barbaric, untalented possessor of a guitar", among other comments, which angered Flynn deeply enough to write the song. "Aesthetics of Hate" was nominated for Best Metal Performance at the 50th Grammy Awards.

== Background ==
"Aesthetics of Hate" was written by Robb Flynn as a retaliation to an article by William Grim for the website Iconoclast. Titled "Aesthetics of Hate: R.I.P. Dimebag Abbott, & Good Riddance", Grim wrote the article stating Darrell was "part of a generation that has confused sputum with art and involuntary reflex actions with emotion", "an ignorant, barbaric, untalented possessor of a guitar" who looks "more simian than human".

After reading the article, Flynn was furious and wrote "Aesthetics of Hate" as a condemnation of Grim's article and Dimebag detractors. He wrote a message on the band's forum expressing his friendship with Darrell and spoke about Grim:

"What would YOU know about love or values? What would YOU know about giving to the world? All that you know is teaching prejudice, and your heart is as black as the 'ignorant, filthy, and hideously ugly, heavy metal fans' you try and paint in your twisted, fictitious ramblings. It's because of people like YOU, that there are Nathan Gales in this world, NOT the Dimebags and metal musicians who work to unite people through music."

— Robert Flynn

== Recording ==
After "Slanderous" and "Beautiful Mourning", "Aesthetics of Hate" was the third song that was written for Machine Head's album The Blackening. Flynn originally presented it to the band as "The Thrashterpiece" which became the songs working title, because according to Flynn "it owes a huge debt to the band Exodus, [there's] a lot of Bay Area thrash worship going on in this song." In February 2005, Machine Head had penned a rough version of "Aesthetics of Hate". A 13-track November 2005 demo featured the song, although it contained what Flynn described as a "totally fucking lame 'Angel of Death' rip off. I hated it every time we played it so I was glad to see that part go!" The band entered Sharkbite Studios, in Oakland, California on August 21, 2006, to begin recording. Production duties were handled by Flynn with assistance from Mark Keaton, and mixing by Colin Richardson.

== Critical reception ==
"Aesthetics of Hate" received positive reviews from music critics. Blabbermouth.net's Don Kaye described the track as "literally breathtaking" and said that the song "channels its title emotion into a blazing volcano of pure speed and furious guitarwork from Flynn and Phil Demmel." Reviewing for France's Hard 'N Heavy magazine, Anthrax's Scott Ian felt that the song is "a riff-o-rama showing off Robb Flynn and Phil Demmel's killer guitar work." Thom Jurek of AllMusic felt "the intense dual arpeggios between both guitarists — Flynn and Phil Demmel on 'Aesthetics of Hate' (as just one example) are among the tightest ever". However, J.D. Considine of Blender commented that the song "cuts from screaming guitars to an ominously whispered, 'May the hands of God strike them down'. Without oversize hooks, calls for biblical vengeance just sound silly."

"Aesthetics of Hate" received a nomination for Best Metal Performance at the 50th Grammy Awards. The ceremony took place on February 12, 2008, with Machine Head being beaten out by Slayer's "Final Six". Flynn commented on the nomination, "We are completely blown away, and honored by this. It's incredible that the anger of this song has connected with so many people. It proves to Dimebag's detractors the positive impact he had on his fans and fellow bands alike."

On August 8, 2008, the song was confirmed to be as part of the "Roadrunner Records" pack in Rock Band.

== Live performances ==
Machine Head would support Metallica on their World Magnetic Tour between 2008 and 2009; on two occasions, James Hetfield would join the band on stage to perform "Aesthetics of Hate".

== Personnel ==
- Robb Flynn – lead vocals, rhythm and lead guitar
- Adam Duce – bass, backing vocals
- Phil Demmel – lead guitar
- Dave McClain – drums
