= Old (song) =

Single by Machine Head

from the album Burn My Eyes
- Released: March 1995
- Recorded: Fantasy Studios
- Genre: Groove metal
- Label: Roadrunner
- Songwriters: Adam Duce, Robb Flynn, Chris Kontos, Logan Mader
- Producer: Colin Richardson

Machine Head singles chronology
"Davidian" (1994)	"Old" (1995)	"Ten Ton Hammer" (1997)

Alternative cover
- Old promo single cover, autographed

Music video
- "Old" on YouTube

"Old" is a song by American heavy metal band Machine Head from the album Burn My Eyes. It was released as a single in March 1995 and is also available on the band's live albums Hellalive and Machine Fucking Head Live.

== Track listing ==
=== Digipack yellow cover version ===
1. "Old" – 4:08
2. "Death Church (Convent Mix)" – 6:28
3. "Old (Eve of Apocalypse Mix)" – 6:01
4. "The Rage to Overcome" (Demo version) – 5:05

=== Digipack white cover version ===
1. "Old" – 4:07
2. "Davidian" (Live) – 7:25
3. "Hard Times" (Live Cro-Mags cover) – 2:28
4. "Death Church" (Demo version) – 6:16

=== Promo version ===
1. "Old" – 4:07
2. "Alans on Fire" (Poison Idea cover) – 4:00
3. "Davidian" (Live) – 7:25
4. "Hard Times" (Live Cro-Mags cover) – 2:28

== Charts ==
Chart (1995)	Peak position
Scotland Singles (OCC)	37
UK Singles (OCC)	43
UK Rock & Metal (OCC)	2
