= The Burning Red =

Studio album by Machine Head
- Released: August 9, 1999
- Recorded: 1998–1999
- Studio: Indigo Ranch Studios (Malibu, California)
- Genre: Nu metal; groove metal
- Length: 50:00
- Label: Roadrunner
- Producer: Ross Robinson

Machine Head chronology
The More Things Change... (1997)	The Burning Red (1999)	Supercharger (2001)

Singles from The Burning Red
- 1. "From This Day" Released: October 31, 1999; 2. "Silver" Released: January 22, 2000; 3. "The Blood, the Sweat, the Tears" Released: June 26, 2000

The Burning Red is the third studio album by American heavy metal band Machine Head. It is the band's second best selling album in the US, selling as many copies in three years as their debut album, Burn My Eyes, sold in almost eight years (1994–2002). The album has sold over 134,000 copies in the US and it was certified silver in 2011 by the BPI for sales of 60,000 in the UK. The Burning Red was Machine Head's first album with guitarist Ahrue Luster, as well as their first venture into nu metal.

== Music and lyrics ==
The album is considered nu metal, which led to backlash from fans. Fans also complained about rapping heard in songs like "From This Day" or "Desire to Fire". Machine Head's drummer Dave McClain said, "Pissing people off isn't a bad thing, you know? For people to be narrow-minded is bad ... [i]t doesn't bother us at all, we know we're going to piss people off with this record, but some people hopefully will actually sit down and listen to the whole record". Robb Flynn, Machine Head's vocalist, said

"There's a minute and a half of rapping on that album. The other 53 minutes of the record are like a giant scar being ripped open while I projectile-vomit through it. If all that people got out of [The Burning Red] was rap-metal, then they didn't fucking listen to it".

Guitarist Logan Mader quit the band in 1998 following the recording of their album The More Things Change... (according to Machine Head's Facebook page, he wrote the main riff for "I Defy" before his departure); he was replaced by Ahrue Luster.

With the recording of The Burning Red, the band added new elements to its music, including a small amount of rapping vocals, a move which some believe to have been influenced by Luster; Luster himself would downplay his influence in retrospect, and Flynn would defend Luster, indicating that the direction was already decided on by the time Luster was hired.

The album shows the band experimenting musically, using a disco drum line in "The Blood, the Sweat, the Tears", putting some rapping vocals in "Desire to Fire", and a layer of crooning vocals on "Silver". Citing the need for a few B-side tracks, producer Ross Robinson encouraged the band to record a smooth-sounding cover of the Police song "Message in a Bottle" after hearing Luster practice it during rehearsal. However, Flynn strongly fought against it being included on the album, and still does not think highly of the cover. The song ended up on the album, not used as a B-side. Joel McIver, however, refused to label The Burning Red nu metal, and he wrote that anyone dismissing the album as nu metal has not listened to it, or is not a fan of the "atmospheric, impassioned groove-metal that Machine Head were focusing on at this stage."

Rick Anderson of AllMusic called the album "aggro-metal". Responding to critics, McClain stated the band was not trying to emulate popular trends; they simply "wanted to sound different". Flynn said that the band had been pigeonholed by those who complained that the two prior albums were too similar to each other, so the band had determined to reach for different influences on this project. He also admitted that his personal situation at the time, which included struggling with depression and bulimia caused by fame, influenced the writing.

Amy Sciaretto of CMJ said that, despite the presence of Robinson who had produced Limp Bizkit and Korn, The Burning Red shows the progression of Machine Head's own "visceral, gut-grinding" sound rather than an imitation of Korn.

The song "Devil with the King's Card" was written about departing guitarist Mader, named after a phrase he used to describe Flynn during substance-induced psychosis. The song "The Blood, The Sweat, The Tears" was written about Flynn's struggle with bulimia, while "Five" is about a sexual abuse incident Flynn suffered as a five-year-old child. He said that recording the song was difficult enough for him; he would never perform it on stage. The title track was written about Flynn's suicide attempt at the age of 17, and was written by Flynn after he recorded the vocals of "Five".

== Artwork ==
The cover photography of the album was done by Dean Karr: the original concept was to photograph a cow's severed head with flowers around it, and while that concept was rejected, the photo of a bloodied orchid from that photo shoot was ultimately chosen as the final cover.

== Reception ==
Professional ratings
Review scores
Source	Rating
AllMusic	4/5 stars
Chronicles of Chaos	9/10
Collector's Guide to Heavy Metal	4/10
The Encyclopedia of Popular Music	3/5 stars
Metal.de	9/10
Metal Hammer	9/10
Metal Rules	1/5
NME	3/10
Rock Hard	9/10

The Burning Red was added to US radio playlists on July 12, 1999, and was released for retail sale on August 9. The album was well received by critics and sold well, but the band's change in image and musical direction was highly criticized, with critics and fans alike accusing the band of "selling out". However, Rick Anderson of AllMusic was among those who praised the album, stating Machine Head was "sounding a bit looser and less constricted musically than they have in the past." David Jarman wrote for CMJ that the album was "pretty much aggro business-as-usual" for fans who were already familiar with the "aggression and alienation" of late-1990s metal musical trends, but that listeners could expect to revel in the album's "thunderous visceral crunch." The Burning Red became Machine Head's top selling album for a number of years, and debuted at number 88 on the Billboard 200.

Shortly after the release of the album, in an interview with Metal-Is, Ross Robinson alleged that there were significant arguments between him and frontman Robb Flynn during the recording sessions, who he described in an interview as "very headstrong". In that same interview, he claimed to be against having rap on the record. In response, a page calling Robinson "ass of the month" was published on the band's website, consisting of two of his press quotes a year apart, with the earlier one praising the album before release. In a retrospective interview for Nu Metal: A Definitive Guide (2021), Robinson admitted to "his ego [getting] in the way" after the album's release; "I did some interviews because people did not like that Machine Head did rap, and I was afraid of not looking cool or something and some of the things I said hurt Robb [Flynn's] feelings. I broke a trust with him and I learned a huge lesson."

In 2019, Loudwire included Machine Head's "Message in a Bottle" cover on their list of the "Top 55 Best Metal Covers of Classic Rock." They considered it to be part of a greater trend of nu metal pop covers, but still said, "Robb Flynn and friends made a surprising choice in The Police's “Message in a Bottle,” which they proceed to deconstruct into a mewling, self-loathing hate-fest — the good kind."

In retrospect, Flynn himself has shown ambivalence about the album, and the band rarely performs songs off it (with the exception of "From This Day"); in a podcast with Suicide Silence's Chris Garza, Flynn explained that while the album was therapeutic for him as he was working through numerous mental health issues, and that it was "an amazing experience", he can't listen to the album due to the memories it brings back. Flynn and Jared MacEachern performed the album in its entirety (with the first time live performances for "I Defy" and "Five", but without "Message in the Bottle") on its 22nd anniversary during a livestream during the COVID-19 pandemic and a year later again, this time with Luster included; Flynn later explained the only way for him to get through the performance was to dissociate.

== Track listing ==
All lyrics are written by Robb Flynn; all music is composed by Machine Head, except where noted.

No.	Title	Music	Length
1.	"Enter the Phoenix"		0:53
2.	"Desire to Fire"		4:49
3.	"Nothing Left"	Flynn, McClain	4:05
4.	"The Blood, the Sweat, the Tears"	Luster, Flynn	4:11
5.	"Silver"	Luster, Flynn	3:52
6.	"From This Day"	Flynn, McClain, Luster	3:56
7.	"Exhale the Vile"		4:57
8.	"Message in a Bottle" (The Police cover; written by Sting)		3:32
9.	"Devil with the King's Card"		4:05
10.	"I Defy"		3:42
11.	"Five"	Luster, Flynn	5:18
12.	"The Burning Red"		6:44
Total length:			50:00

- Writing credits according to Hellalive liner notes

Japanese bonus tracks
No.	Title	Length
13.	"House of Suffering" (Bad Brains cover)	2:10
14.	"Alcoholocaust"	3:46

== Personnel ==
- Robb Flynn – lead vocals, rhythm guitar
- Ahrue Luster – lead guitar, intro arrangements on "Enter the Phoenix"
- Adam Duce – bass, backing vocals
- Dave McClain – drums

Production

- Ross Robinson – production
- Chuck Johnson – engineering
- Kevin Bosley – engineering
- Rob Agnello – engineering
- Ted Regier – assistant engineering
- Terry Date – mixing
- Ted Jensen – mastering
- Lynda Kusnetz – creative direction
- Deanna Alcorn – design
- t42design – artwork

== Chart positions ==
Chart (1999)	Peak position
Australian Albums Chart	30
Austrian Albums Chart	22
Belgian Albums Chart (Flanders)	35
Dutch Albums Chart	35
Finnish Albums Chart	12
French Albums Chart	55
German Albums Chart	15
New Zealand Albums Chart	47
Norwegian Albums Chart	35
Scottish Albums Chart	23
Swedish Albums Chart	17
UK Album Chart	13
Billboard 200	88

== Certifications ==
Region	Certification	Certified units/sales
United Kingdom (BPI)	Silver	60,000^{^}
^{^} Shipments figures based on certification alone.
