= The Blackening =

Studio album by Machine Head
- Released: March 27, 2007
- Recorded: August 21 – November 16, 2006
- Studios: Sharkbite Studios, Oakland, California
- Genres: Thrash metal; groove metal; progressive metal
- Length: 61:04
- Label: Roadrunner
- Producer: Robb Flynn

Machine Head chronology
| Elegies (2005) | The Blackening (2007) | The Black Procession (2011) |

Singles from The Blackening
- 1. "Aesthetics of Hate" Released: April 3, 2007; 2. "Now I Lay Thee Down" Released: October 2, 2007; 3. "Halo" Released: May 13, 2008

The Blackening is the sixth studio album by American heavy metal band Machine Head. Released on March 27, 2007, in the United States, The Blackening sold 16,000 units in its first week, and became Machine Head's third highest charting release at number 54 on the Billboard 200, and charted in the Top 20 throughout many countries in the rest of the world. The Blackening has been certified gold by the BPI for sales in the UK in excess of 100,000 copies.

The album's first single, "Aesthetics of Hate", is a retaliation to an article written by William Grim for the website Iconoclast. Titled "Aesthetics of Hate: R.I.P. Dimebag Abbott, & Good Riddance", the article praised the murder of guitarist Dimebag Darrell. Machine Head frontman Robb Flynn said the song was written as a "fuck you" to Grim and tribute to Dimebag. The song received a Grammy Award nomination for "Best Metal Performance" at the 50th Grammy Awards. The text in the mirror on the album's cover reads, "the mirror which flatters not." The song "Beautiful Mourning" has been featured as a playable song in the video game Guitar Hero: Metallica. The song "Aesthetics of Hate" is featured as a DLC song in the video game Rock Band.

== Background ==
The inaugural song written for Machine Head's follow up to their 2003 release Through the Ashes of Empires was entitled "Godfather 4". This was in reference to a guitar riff in the song which vocalist Robert Flynn felt had "a Godfather type vibe". The song was shelved, although the riff resurfaced in a b-side. "Slanderous" was the first song finished that was in the final track listing. By February 2005, Machine Head had penned rough versions of "Beautiful Mourning" and "Aesthetics of Hate".

== Recording ==
A November 2005 demo contained thirteen songs, which included rough versions of "Aesthetics of Hate" and "Halo". "Aesthetics of Hate" contained what Flynn described as a "totally fucking lame "Angel of Death" rip off. I hated it every time we played it so I was glad to see that part go!" In mid August 2006, Machine Head announced that the title of their sixth studio effort would be The Blackening. Flynn and drummer Dave McClain spent August 18 and 19 jamming together, fine tuning songs chosen for the album and performing pre-production. Phil Demmel resumed lead guitar duties and Adam Duce returned as bassist.

Machine Head entered Sharkbite Studios in Oakland, California on August 21 to begin recording The Blackening, with Flynn assuming production duties for the second time. From twenty six written songs, the selection was whittled down to eight. McClain completed the drum tracks to six of the eight tracks on August 25, followed by the remaining two the next day. Tracking concluded on November 16, 2006.

The band was surprised at the length of "A Farewell to Arms" and "Clenching the Fists of Dissent" running over ten minutes, and wondered if their fans would "be able to get their heads around" what the band was doing. Record company Roadrunner Records hesitated the band's decision to open the album with a ten and a half minute song ("Clenching the Fists of Dissent"), and asked the band questions similar to "Are you sure you don't want to get into something a little more direct?" The band disregarded the comment and believed the song set the tone musically for the remainder of the album. Flynn claimed the band initially didn't notice the songs were that long, and after timing them and being surprised by the duration; the band briefly trimmed down the songs up to 5 minutes, but ultimately decided against it, and Flynn called the trimmed down versions "going on a rollercoaster, and you just took out all the loop-de-loops."

Flynn said "Clenching the Fists of Dissent" and "Wolves" were the most difficult songs to construct. For "Clenching", he attributed the difficulty to the number of tracks; the introduction of the song has 90, including multiple three-part harmony with two guitars, 20 tracks of snare drum, four tracks of kick drum, and military marching cymbals. The song continues with five electric guitars, three acoustic guitars and two bass guitars. Flynn also described the song "Wolves" as difficult because "it's all got to be super tight; there were so many riffs that had to be just locked on down picking". Mark Keaton provided audio engineering, and Colin Richardson mixed the record in London.

Flynn believes the band was naive about the length of songs, and was unconcerned if they would be suitable for radio or MTV, as the band purposely did not want to receive airplay. "Now I Lay Thee Down" has a chorus Flynn describes as "poppy" and added "fucked up lyrics" about one person killing another, and then committing suicide. This was to make the song not suitable for airplay as the band wanted to make a "dark epic record".

== Lyrical themes ==
Lyrical themes explored in The Blackening include love, war, organized religion, anger towards society, and Machine Head's "winner take all" spirit. The album's first single, "Aesthetics of Hate", is a retaliation that captures the band's anger towards an article written by William Grim for the conservative website Iconoclast.com. Titled "Aesthetics of Hate: R.I.P. Dimebag Abbott, & Good Riddance", the article praised the murder of Dimebag Darrell by Nathan Gale, while Darrell was performing with Damageplan on December 8, 2004. Grim wrote Darrell was "an ignorant, barbaric, untalented possessor of a guitar" who looks "more simian than human" and is "part of a generation that has confused sputum with art and involuntary reflex actions with emotion". After reading the article, Flynn was furious and wrote the song to send a message to Grim implying "fuck you", and pay tribute to Dimebag. He created a post on the band's message board soon after the event describing his friendship with Dimebag.

"What would YOU know about love or values? What would YOU know about giving to the world? All that you know is teaching prejudice, and your heart is as black as the 'ignorant, filthy, and hideously ugly, heavy metal fans' you try and paint in your twisted, fictitious ramblings. It's because of people like YOU, that there are Nathan Gale's in this world, NOT the Dimebags and metal musicians who work to unite people through music".

— Robb Flynn speaks about William Grim who wrote an article praising Dimebag Darrell's murder.

The songs "Clenching the Fists of Dissent", "A Farewell to Arms" (probably a reference to Ernest Hemingway's novel of the same title, which is set during the first World War), and "Halo" deal with politics, the war in Iraq, and organized religion respectively. The band wrote the lyrics about the Iraq War after conducting research and found that "a lot of stuff does not add up"; Flynn was hesitant to address such a topic, expecting a backlash, but after consulting the band, he went forward. Machine Head's debut album, Burn My Eyes, featured a similar song titled "A Thousand Lies" which dealt with the Gulf War. "Slanderous" deals with hate that still exists throughout society and "Wolves" addresses the band's competitive "winner takes all" spirit. "Now I Lay Thee Down" features a Romeo and Juliet-esque love story about one person killing another person, and then killing themselves. The song relates to the William Shakespeare play, Romeo & Juliet, where at the end of the story, two lovers kill themselves because they assume that their lover is dead. The original lyrics to the chorus of the song were considered "poppy" by Flynn and his band-mates, so they intentionally changed the lyrics so it would not get radio play.

== Reception ==
Professional ratings
Review scores
| Source | Rating |
|---|---|
| AllMusic | 4.5/5 stars |
| Blabbermouth.net | 9.5/10 |
| Blender | 3.5/5 stars |
| Brave Words & Bloody Knuckles | 7.5/10 |
| Collector's Guide to Heavy Metal | 7/10 |
| IGN | 8.4/10 |
| MusicOMH | 5/5 stars |
| PopMatters | 8/10 |
| Rock Sound | 9/10 |
| The Skinny | 2/5 stars |

The Blackening received critical acclaim. Blabbermouth.net reviewer Don Kaye awarded the album an almost perfect score of 9.5 out of 10, saying: "one of the purest, finest, most powerful expressions of modern heavy metal released". Kaye praised the guitar work of Flynn and Demmel on the tracks "Beautiful Mourning" and "Aesthetics of Hate", and thought the band members surpassed their musical ability in an "intense and dynamic way".

Thom Jurek of AllMusic described the album as "an over the top rage and pummelfest with all the qualities that earned the group its enormous fan base by touring and recording" and that the thrash metal element "rivals Slayer at their best". Rock Sound magazine reviewer Eleanor Goodman awarded the album 9 out of 10, praising the first two minutes of the opening song, "Clenching the Fists of Dissent", as "a full-on old-skool thrash attack".

In a rare negative review, James Jam from NME stated that "The Blackening is no return to form, yet the longer songs on the record (many clock in at over 10 minutes and sound like the bit in '80s horror films when somebody gets stabbed through the head) are intriguing works of progressive metal that suggest they've become aware of the genius of Mastodon. Yet, that a band's new record makes you want to dig out their 12-year-old debut, is hardly a great thing".

"Aesthetics of Hate" received a Grammy Award nomination for "Best Metal Performance" at the 50th Grammy Awards, which took place on February 12, 2008. Though heavily favored, they controversially lost to eventual winners Slayer who had won the previous year for the same album (other nominees in the category were King Diamond, Shadows Fall, and As I Lay Dying).

At the fifth annual Metal Hammer Golden Gods Awards and at the Kerrang! Awards in 2007, The Blackening won best album. The album also won a 2007 Danish Metal Award for International Album of the Year. In January 2008, it won a Swedish Metal Award for Best Foreign Metal.

Three years after the release of The Blackening, Machine Head wrapped their touring cycle for the album, finishing in Sydney, Australia on March 28. In February 2010, The Blackening was listed as one of the Albums of the Decade by Metal Hammer. On October 8, 2011, the album was voted Roadrunner Records "Album of the Century" in a poll.

== Chart performance ==
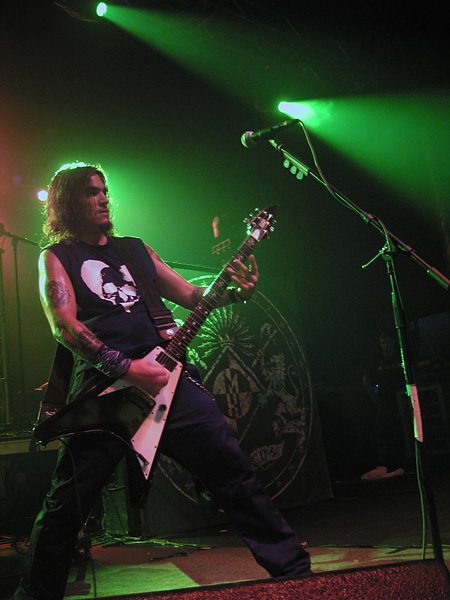
Robb Flynn performing at a concert promoting The Blackening

The Blackening was leaked on to the Internet two weeks before its release by an American journalist who received an advanced copy. Demmel thought it unfortunate, but that it created a "pre-buzz", as did Flynn who thought the buzz was nothing like the band had before; "There's internet street buzz vs. record company hype and if the hype matches up to the street buzz, then you're seeing a lot of bands selling a lot of records in the first week". The Blackening became Machine Head's highest charting release in the United States, where it entered the Top Rock albums at No. 9, and the Billboard 200 at No. 54 (their highest charting and first week ever), with sales of almost 16,000 copies. This improved on the band's 2004 release, Through the Ashes of Empires, which sold 12,000 units in its first week, and entered the Billboard 200 at No. 88.

The album did exceptionally well overseas where it entered the Mainstream Top 20 in the German and Belgian charts at No. 12, No. 14 in Australia, No. 16 in the United Kingdom and No. 19 in Sweden. Charting positions below the Top 20 consisted of Ireland at No. 23, No. 29 in the Netherlands, No. 34 in France and No. 55 in Italy. The Blackening sold more copies in two weeks than Through the Ashes of Empires sold in three years.

== Cover art and special edition ==
The artwork for The Blackening was designed by Robb Flynn, longtime Machine Head collaborator Paul Brown, and Deanna Alcorn. Based on an engraving from the 16th century, it conveys the recurring Christian themes of the temporary nature of worldly power. It features a skeleton on a throne, covered in symbols and trappings of royalty. The skeleton bears a mirror with the words "The mirrour (sic) which flatters not." Flynn thought "this whole record is like holding up a mirror to ourselves. It's talking about things that are going on now, but it's not necessarily specific to this time."

Three special editions of The Blackening were released: a two-LP gatefold vinyl, a two-disc special edition packaged in a silver foil-enhanced slipcase, with a bonus Metallica cover added to the end of the album. The second disc was a DVD featuring a video entitled The Making of The Blackening, and a 2006 tour diary of the Sounds of the Underground Tour. Both of these versions were released in 2007.

The third version, released in 2008, was a 3-disc set which came with the original album, a CD featuring various covers the band had recorded in the past, demos and other unreleased material and a DVD which featured various live performances of the band at festivals, the Burn My Eyes 10th anniversary show and music videos from The Blackening accompanied by their "making's of".

== Track listing ==
| No. | Title | Lyrics | Music | Length |
|---|---|---|---|---|
| 1. | "Clenching the Fists of Dissent" | Robert Flynn | Flynn, Dave McClain, Phil Demmel | 10:37 |
| 2. | "Beautiful Mourning" | Flynn | Flynn, Demmel | 4:46 |
| 3. | "Aesthetics of Hate" | Flynn, Adam Duce | Flynn | 6:30 |
| 4. | "Now I Lay Thee Down" | Flynn | Flynn, Demmel | 5:35 |
| 5. | "Slanderous" | Flynn | Flynn, Demmel | 5:17 |
| 6. | "Halo" | Flynn | Flynn, McClain, Duce, Demmel | 9:03 |
| 7. | "Wolves" | Flynn | Flynn, Demmel, Duce | 9:01 |
| 8. | "A Farewell to Arms" | Flynn, Duce, Demmel | Flynn, Demmel | 10:13 |
| Total length: | | | | 61:04 |

Deluxe edition bonus track
| No. | Title | Length |
|---|---|---|
| 9. | "Hallowed Be Thy Name" (Iron Maiden cover) | 7:27 |
| 10. | "Battery" (Metallica cover) | 5:02 |

2008 bonus disc
| No. | Title | Length |
|---|---|---|
| 1. | "Alan's on Fire" (Poison Idea cover) | 3:59 |
| 2. | "Negative Creep" (Nirvana cover) | 2:40 |
| 3. | "Seasons Wither" | 6:15 |
| 4. | "My Misery" | 4:38 |
| 5. | "House of Suffering" (Bad Brains cover) | 2:09 |
| 6. | "The Possibility of Life's Destruction" (Discharge cover) | 1:26 |
| 7. | "Ten Ton Hammer" (Extended Original Mix) | 5:06 |
| 8. | "Hole in the Sky" (Black Sabbath cover) | 3:32 |
| 9. | "Colors" (Ice-T cover) | 4:41 |
| 10. | "Hard Times" (Live Cro-Mags cover) | 2:02 |
| 11. | "Halo (I Want Your Soul)" (Demo) | 6:34 |
| 12. | "Aesthetics of Hate (Thrash-Terpiece)" (Demo) | 4:49 |

2007 special edition DVD
| No. | Title | Length |
|---|---|---|
| 1. | "The Making of The Blackening" | 24:28 |
| 2. | "Sounds of the Underground 2006 Tour Diary" | 10:37 |

2008 special edition DVD
| No. | Title | Length |
|---|---|---|
| 1. | "Clenching the Fists of Dissent" (Live at With Full Force 2008) | 8:44 |
| 2. | "Now I Lay Thee Down" (Live at With Full Force 2008) | 5:30 |
| 3. | "Halo" (Live at With Full Force 2008) | 9:20 |
| 4. | "Aesthetics of Hate" (Live at Rock in Rio 2008) | 6:07 |
| 5. | "Davidian" (Live at Rock in Rio 2008) | 6:35 |
| 6. | "Imperium" (Live at Download 2007) | 6:05 |
| 7. | "Old" (Live at Download 2007) | 5:02 |
| 8. | "A Thousand Lies" (Live at Burn My Eyes 10th Anniversary Show 2004) | 7:04 |
| 9. | "The Rage to Overcome" (Live at Burn My Eyes 10th Anniversary Show 2004) | 4:33 |
| 10. | "Death Church" (Live at Burn My Eyes 10th Anniversary Show 2004) | 5:43 |
| 11. | "Blood for Blood" (Live at Burn My Eyes 10th Anniversary Show 2004) | 5:54 |
| 12. | "Halo" (Uncensored & Unedited Music Video) | 5:10 |
| 13. | "Now I Lay Thee Down" (Uncensored & Unedited Music Video) | 5:36 |
| 14. | "Aesthetics of Hate" (Uncensored & Unedited Music Video) | 6:09 |
| 15. | "The Making of Halo" | 6:32 |
| 16. | "The Making of Now I Lay Thee Down" | 4:54 |
| 17. | "The Making of Aesthetics of Hate" | 3:26 |

== Credits ==
Writing, performance, and production credits were adapted from the album's liner notes.

=== Personnel ===
==== Machine Head ====
- Robb Flynn – lead vocals, rhythm guitar, lead guitar on "Aesthetics of Hate" and "Hallowed Be Thy Name"
- Phil Demmel – lead guitar
- Adam Duce – bass, backing vocals
- Dave McClain – drums

==== Production ====
- Robb Flynn – production
- Mark Keaton – engineering
- Vincent Wojno – additional engineering, Pro Tools editing
- Colin Richardson – mixing
- Matt Hyde – mixing engineer
- Lee Slater – assistant engineer
- Rohan Onraet – assistant engineer
- Eddy Schreyer – mastering

==== Visual art ====
- Alex Solca – photography
- Bau-da Design – package design
- Deanna Alcorn – package design
- Robb Flynn – package design

=== Studios ===
- Sharkbite Studios, Oakland, California – recording
- Strongroom Studios, London – mixing
- Metropolis Studios, London – mixing
- VIP Studios, Oakland, California – Pro Tools editing
- Oasis Mastering, Burbank, California, mastering

== Charts ==
| Chart | Peak position |
|---|---|
| Australian Albums (ARIA) | 14 |
| Austrian Albums (Ö3 Austria) | 19 |
| Belgian Albums (Ultratop Flanders) | 52 |
| Belgian Albums (Ultratop Wallonia) | 74 |
| Dutch Albums (Album Top 100) | 29 |
| Finnish Albums (Suomen virallinen lista) | 33 |
| French Albums (SNEP) | 36 |
| German Albums (Offizielle Top 100) | 12 |
| Irish Albums (IRMA) | 23 |
| Italian Albums (FIMI) | 55 |
| Japanese Albums (Oricon) | 59 |
| Norwegian Albums (VG-lista) | 36 |
| Scottish Albums (Official Charts) | 18 |
| Spanish Albums (Promusicae) | 79 |
| Swedish Albums (Sverigetopplistan) | 19 |
| Swiss Albums (Schweizer Hitparade) | 29 |
| UK Albums (Official Charts) | 16 |
| US Billboard 200 | 54 |
| US Top Rock Albums (Billboard) | 15 |

== Certifications ==
| Region | Certification | Certified units/sales |
|---|---|---|
| United Kingdom (BPI) | Gold | 100,000^{‡} |
^{‡} Sales+streaming figures based on certification alone.
