= Chris Kontos (drummer) =

American drummer (born 1968)

Chris Kontos (born June 25, 1968) is an American drummer, born in New York City. As a former drummer of the heavy metal band Machine Head, he performed on their first album, 1994's Burn My Eyes. He and the band parted ways in 1995, before their second album. He played in many bands and projects before and after that period of time, including Testament, Konkhra, Attitude Adjustment, Exodus, Death Angel, and Verbal Abuse. Kontos is recognized by his peers for his performance on songs—notably in "Davidian"—which are "considered by many as classic pieces of metal drumming".

Kontos performed with Machine Head for the first time in 24 years with a tour celebrating the 25th anniversary of the release of Burn My Eyes in 2019, though, he never officially rejoined the band.

On April 19, 2023, Kontos was announced as the drummer for the reactivated band Forbidden.

Kontos currently uses Ddrum drums, Soultone cymbals, Vic Firth drumsticks, and Czarcie Kopyto pedals.

== Discography ==
- Attitude Adjustment, Dead Serious demo (1985)
- Attitude Adjustment, American Paranoia (1986)
- Attitude Adjustment, No More Mr. Nice Guy EP (1988)
- Verbal Abuse – Passport, Verbal Abuse of America (1989)
- Attitude Adjustment, Out of Hand (1991)
- Grinch, The Blacking Factory (1992)
- Machine Head, Burn My Eyes (1994)
- Verbal Abuse, Red, White and Violent (1995)
- Konkhra, Weed Out The Weak (1997)
- The Servants, Mostly Monsters (2002)
- Anti-Trust, Guilty as Charged (2005)
- Various Artists, A Tribute to Judas Priest: Legends of Metal (plays with Testament on "Rapid Fire")
- Sangre Eterna demo (2006)
- Spiralarms EP (2007)
- Attitude Adjustment, "No Way Back" (2010)
- Anti-Trust, "Guilty" (2021)
- The Boneless Ones, "Back to the Grind" (2022)
- Forbidden, Forbidden (2026)
