= Supercharger (album) =

Studio album by Machine Head
- Released: October 2, 2001
- Recorded: March 15 – May 1, 2001
- Studios: Indigo Ranch (Malibu, California); Mad Dog (Burbank, California)
- Genres: Nu metal; groove metal
- Length: 56:30; 74:05 (digipak)
- Label: Roadrunner
- Producer: Johnny K

Machine Head chronology
The Burning Red (1999)	Supercharger (2001)	Hellalive (2003)

Singles from Supercharger
- 1. "Crashing Around You" Released: September 2001

Professional ratings
Review scores
Source	Rating
AllMusic	2.5/5 stars
Blabbermouth.net	8/10
Collector's Guide to Heavy Metal	2/10
Playlouder	4/5 stars

Supercharger is the fourth studio album by American heavy metal band Machine Head. The release was ill-timed, and, as a result of little promotion, fell far short of the success of The Burning Red, which has sold about 134,000 copies in the US to date. Supercharger has sold about 45,000 copies in the US to date, making it a commercial failure. It is the band's last release to feature guitarist Ahrue Luster. The album continues the nu metal style first heard on The Burning Red.

== Album information ==
Supercharger was released in October 2001, just weeks after the 9/11 terrorist attacks. The lead (and only) single "Crashing Around You", was pulled from MTV and rock radio just as soon as it was added despite being the "most added" track in the United States. The pull was a result of the metaphorical "crashing" lyric in the song and the burning San Francisco skyline in the video.

Machine Head's support tour for the album was done without help from their label Roadrunner Records, and after the release of Hellalive to fulfill their contract, led the band to a two-year hiatus from the label's American branch.

The album was released in standard and digipak editions, the latter of which contains four previously released bonus tracks.

== Track listing ==
No.	Title	Lyrics	Music	Length
1.	"Declaration"	Robert Flynn, Ahrue Luster, Dave McClain, Adam Duce	Flynn, Luster, McClain, Duce	1:11
2.	"Bulldozer"	Flynn	Flynn	4:35
3.	"White-Knuckle Blackout!"	Flynn, Duce	Flynn, Luster	3:15
4.	"Crashing Around You"	Flynn	Flynn	3:14
5.	"Kick You When You're Down"	Flynn	Flynn, Luster	4:01
6.	"Only the Names"	Flynn	Flynn	6:08
7.	"All in Your Head"	Flynn	Flynn, Luster	4:06
8.	"American High"	Flynn	Flynn, Luster, McClain	3:48
9.	"Brown Acid"	Flynn, Luster, McClain, Duce	Flynn, Luster, McClain, Duce	0:59
10.	"Nausea"	Flynn, Duce	Flynn, Luster, McClain	4:24
11.	"Blank Generation"	Flynn	Flynn, Luster	6:38
12.	"Trephination"	Flynn	Flynn, Luster, McClain	4:59
13.	"Deafening Silence"	Flynn	Flynn, Luster	5:33
14.	"Supercharger"	Flynn, Duce	Flynn, McClain	3:48
Total length:				56:39

Japanese bonus track
No.	Title	Writer(s)	Length
15.	"Hole in the Sky" (Black Sabbath cover)	Ozzy Osbourne, Tony Iommi, Geezer Butler, Bill Ward	3:33
Total length:			60:12

Digipak release
No.	Title	Lyrics	Music	Length
15.	"The Blood, the Sweat, the Tears" (live)	Flynn	Flynn, Luster	4:35
Total length:				61:16

18 track digipak release
No.	Title	Lyrics	Music	Length
15.	"Hole in the Sky" (Black Sabbath cover)		Osbourne, Iommi, Butler, Ward	3:33
16.	"Ten Fold" (from the Supercharger sessions)	Flynn	Luster	4:53
17.	"The Blood, the Sweat, the Tears" (live)	Flynn	Flynn, Luster	4:35
18.	"Desire to Fire" (live)	Flynn	Flynn	4:37
Total length:				74:17

The bonus track on several editions of Supercharger, "Hole in the Sky", originally appeared on Nativity in Black II. The two live tracks on the 18 track digipak were recorded on September 15, 1999, at Webster Hall, Hartford, Connecticut. These live tracks were previously released on the Year of the Dragon EP.

== Personnel ==
Machine Head

- Robb Flynn – vocals, guitar
- Ahrue Luster – guitar
- Adam Duce – bass
- Dave McClain – drums

Technical personnel

- Johnny K. – production
- Machine Head – co-production
- Colin Richardson – mixing
- Johnny K., Kevin Bosley – engineers
- Scott Oyster – assistant engineer
- Brett Nolan – assistant mix engineer
- Ted Jensen – mastering

"Hole in the Sky"

- Colin Richardson – production
- Toby Wright – mixing

Live tracks

- Machine Head – production
- Toby Wright – mixing

== Chart positions ==
Chart (2001)	Peak position
Australian Albums Chart	24
Austrian Albums Chart	33
Belgian Albums Chart (Flanders)	46
Dutch Albums Chart	88
Finnish Albums Chart	25
French Albums Chart	35
German Albums Chart	25
Italian Albums Chart	48
Swedish Albums Chart	42
Swiss Albums Chart	82
UK Album Chart	34
The Billboard 200	115
