= The More Things Change... =

Studio album by Machine Head
- Released: March 25, 1997
- Studio: The Plant (Sausalito); Hyde Street Studios (San Francisco)
- Genre: Groove metal; speed metal; progressive metal
- Length: 52:42
- Label: Roadrunner
- Producer: Colin Richardson

Machine Head chronology
| Burn My Eyes (1994) | The More Things Change... (1997) | The Burning Red (1999) |

Singles from The More Things Change...
- 1. "Ten Ton Hammer" Released: 1997; 2. "Take My Scars" Released: November 24, 1997

Professional ratings
Review scores
| Source | Rating |
|---|---|
| AllMusic | 4/5 stars |
| Chronicles of Chaos | 7/10 |
| Collector's Guide to Heavy Metal | 8/10 |
| The Encyclopedia of Popular Music | 3/5 stars |
| In Music We Trust | 4/5 stars |
| Metal Hammer | 4.5/5 stars |
| NME | 1/10 |
| Rock Hard | 9/10 |
| Select | 2/5 stars |
| Vox | 6/10 |

The More Things Change… is the second studio album by American heavy metal band Machine Head, released on March 25, 1997 through Roadrunner Records. It is the band's last release to feature original guitarist Logan Mader and the first to feature drummer Dave McClain. The album's title alludes to the first part of the phrase, "The more things change, the more they stay the same"; the same phrase is mentioned during the chorus of "Struck a Nerve".

The More Things Change... reached #138 on the Billboard 200 chart in 1997. By July 1998, it had sold 400,000 copies worldwide, with 115,000 copies sold in the United States (as of 2002). In 2020, it was named one of the 20 best metal albums of 1997 by Metal Hammer magazine.

== Artwork ==
The album cover was photographed by Joseph Cultice; Dave McKean designed an artwork that was ultimately not used.

== Track listing ==
All lyrics are written by Robb Flynn; all music is composed by Machine Head, except where noted.

| No. | Title | Length |
|---|---|---|
| 1. | "Ten Ton Hammer" | 4:14 |
| 2. | "Take My Scars" | 4:19 |
| 3. | "Struck a Nerve" | 3:33 |
| 4. | "Down to None" | 5:28 |
| 5. | "The Frontlines" | 5:51 |
| 6. | "Spine" | 6:37 |
| 7. | "Bay of Pigs" | 3:46 |
| 8. | "Violate" | 7:19 |
| 9. | "Blistering" | 4:58 |
| 10. | "Blood of the Zodiac" | 6:37 |
| Total length: | | 52:42 |

Japanese edition enhanced CD
| No. | Title | Length |
|---|---|---|
| 1. | "Ten Ton Hammer" (music video) | 4:28 |

Digipak edition bonus tracks
| No. | Title | Length |
|---|---|---|
| 11. | "The Possibility of Life's Destruction" (Discharge cover) | 1:31 |
| 12. | "My Misery" | 4:42 |
| 13. | "Colors" (Ice-T cover) | 4:39 |

== Personnel ==
Machine Head

- Robb Flynn – vocals, guitar
- Logan Mader – guitar
- Adam Duce – bass, backing vocals
- Dave McClain – drums

Production

- Robb Flynn – mixing
- Vincent Wojno – engineering
- Colin Richardson – mixing, production
- Andy Sneap – mixing
- Steve Baughman – mixing assistance
- Ted Jensen – mastering

== Chart performance ==
| Chart (1997) | Peak position |
|---|---|
| Australian Albums Chart | 30 |
| Austrian Albums Chart | 24 |
| Belgian Albums Chart (Flanders) | 11 |
| Belgian Albums Chart (Wallonia) | 20 |
| Dutch Albums Chart | 22 |
| Finnish Albums Chart | 13 |
| French Albums Chart | 21 |
| German Albums Chart | 22 |
| Hungarian Albums Chart | 25 |
| New Zealand Albums Chart | 44 |
| Norwegian Albums Chart | 15 |
| Scottish Albums Chart | 23 |
| Swedish Albums Chart | 17 |
| UK Album Chart | 16 |
| Billboard 200 | 138 |
