= Burn My Eyes =

Studio album by Machine Head
- Released: August 9, 1994
- Recorded: November 1993
- Studio: Fantasy Studios in Berkeley, California
- Genre: Groove metal
- Length: 55:34
- Label: Roadrunner
- Producer: Colin Richardson

Machine Head chronology
Burn My Eyes (1994)	The More Things Change... (1997)

Singles from Burn My Eyes
- 1. "Davidian" Released: 1994; 2. "Old" Released: March 1995

Burn My Eyes is the debut studio album by American heavy metal band Machine Head, released on August 9, 1994, by Roadrunner Records. The album's themes generally tie into the social disorder and corresponding inner tension that the band was exposed to in their native Oakland, California, reflected in Robb Flynn's lyrics, such as the Los Angeles Riots of 1992 and the Waco Siege of 1993. The album's title alludes to the third part of the phrase, "Burn my eyes and try to blind me" during the breakdown of "Old". The album shipped over 400,000 copies worldwide, becoming Roadrunner Records's best-selling debut album until the release of Slipknot's self-titled debut album. This is Machine Head's only studio album to feature drummer Chris Kontos.

== Album information ==
The songs make references to some certain well-publicized controversies such as the 1992 Los Angeles Riots (heard in dialogue on "Real Eyes, Realize, Real Lies") and the Waco Siege of 1993 ("Davidian"). Elsewhere, there are tales of physical and mental abuse ("None But My Own", "The Rage to Overcome"), the condemning of profits from religious soliciting ("Death Church"), succumbing to substance abuse ("I'm Your God Now"), and aforementioned themes of urban decay, social unrest, rebellion, belligerence, or socio-political commentary.

Stylistically, the album is credited as having bridged the gap between "second-generation Bay Area thrash (Testament, Death Angel, etc.) and the modern-day Pantera school of hard knocks." Compared to their later releases, it's rawer and more aggressive; after changing their sound on their three subsequent albums, the style was resurrected in modified form—the influences of Gothenburg were evident—on their post-Supercharger output.

The release of this album was followed shortly by numerous tours, which eventually led to drummer Chris Kontos leaving the band and being replaced, after careful consideration, by Dave McClain, who would stay with the band until 2018. The album has since become a lasting success. In 1994, it quickly became a Roadrunner Records best seller and was the label's best-selling debut album for a number of years, until the release of Slipknot's 1999 self-titled debut.

== Cancelled re-release ==
On October 31, 2006, Roadrunner Records announced that as part of their 25th anniversary, they would be re-releasing Burn My Eyes with a bonus CD, which includes previously unreleased tracks and rarities. It was said to be due out on January 8, 2007, but was then pushed back to September 2007 so it would not interfere with the release of The Blackening. However, the re-release was cancelled. Robb Flynn explained this on his blog, which is posted on Machinehead1.com:

"To the best of our knowledge, the BME re-release that was supposed to have coincided with the 25th anniversary of Roadrunner Records back in 2005 and was then re-scheduled to be released in Oct 2006, has been back-burnered. And as far as we're concerned, that's a good thing. This is the year of The Blackening, and the time frame to re-release it has passed, not to mention that the idea of re-releasing a 13-year old album that we already celebrated with 2 anniversary shows (3 years ago) makes zero sense to us. We were never excited about re-issuing it to begin with, as it was just gonna have a bunch of b-sides, and wouldn't have been nearly as cool some of the other re-issues that had DVDs and all sorts of cool shit... so, as much as some of you may be bummed, know that it's better this way."

== Anniversary performances ==
To celebrate the 25th anniversary of Burn My Eyes's release in 2019, drummer Chris Kontos and guitarist Logan Mader would return to tour with Machine Head, during which they would join vocalist Robb Flynn and bassist Jared MacEachern on stage each night to perform the album in its entirety. Many of the scheduled dates for this tour were ultimately cancelled due to the COVID-19 pandemic.

While preparing for the tour, the lineup of Flynn, Kontos, Mader and MacEachern recorded a live performance of the album at Sharkbite Studios in Oakland, California. This performance was filmed, and was initially shared as a video on YouTube. The audio recording was later released under the title Burn My Eyes (Live-in-the-Studio 2019), first as a limited edition vinyl and then to streaming services in 2021.

During to the COVID-19 lockdowns, Flynn began a weekly livestream in which he would initially perform acoustic renditions of Machine Head songs and covers. He was later joined by other musicians once the lockdown orders and travel restrictions were lifted. In August 2021, the lineup of Flynn, Kontos, Mader and MacEachern reunited to perform Burn My Eyes on this livestream for the album's 27th anniversary. In August 2022, Kontos also joined Flynn and MacEachern on stream to perform the album again for its 28th anniversary, this time without Mader. These performances took place at the band's rehearsal studio in the San Francisco Bay Area and were streamed via YouTube, Facebook and Twitch.

== Reception ==
Professional ratings
Review scores
Source	Rating
AllMusic	4.5/5 stars
Collector's Guide to Heavy Metal	9/10
The Encyclopedia of Popular Music	4/5 stars
Kerrang!	(1994) (2011)
Metal.de	10/10
Q	4/5 stars
Rock Hard	10/10

- Q magazine – "A violent, grinding experience, spiked with social comment and spruced up with some brain-tingling guitar solos. Straddling the new '90s metal subject matter of religion, war and injustice, Burn My Eyes is a colossal album, a landmark."

== Track listing ==
All lyrics are written by Robb Flynn; all music is composed by Machine Head.

No.	Title	Length
1.	"Davidian"	4:56
2.	"Old"	4:05
3.	"A Thousand Lies"	6:13
4.	"None But My Own"	6:14
5.	"The Rage to Overcome"	4:46
6.	"Death Church"	6:33
7.	"A Nation on Fire"	5:33
8.	"Blood for Blood"	3:40
9.	"I'm Your God Now"	5:50
10.	"Real Eyes, Realize, Real Lies"	2:45
11.	"Block"	4:59
Total length:		55:34

Digipak edition bonus tracks
No.	Title	Length
12.	"Alan's on Fire" (Poison Idea cover)	4:00

Japanese edition bonus tracks
No.	Title	Length
12.	"Alan's on Fire" (Poison Idea cover)	4:00
13.	"Davidian" (live)	7:26
14.	"Hard Times" (live; Cro-Mags cover)	2:27

=== Australian tour edition ===
The following songs constitute the entirety of the Burn My Eyes Demo.

No.	Title	Length
1.	"Death Church"	6:18
2.	"Old"	4:23
3.	"The Rage to Overcome"	5:04
4.	"A Nation on Fire"	4:46
5.	"Real Eyes, Realize, Real Lies / Fuck It All"	6:54

== Personnel ==
Machine Head

- Robb Flynn – vocals, guitar
- Logan Mader – guitar
- Adam Duce – bass, backing vocals
- Chris Kontos – drums

Artwork

- Dave McKean – cover illustration and design
- Jesse Fischer – band photo
- Harald O. & Wasco – live photos
- Robb Flynn – Machine Head logo

Production

- Colin Richardson – production, mixing
- Machine Head – co-production
- Vincent Wojno – engineering, recording, mixing at Scream Studios
- Steven Werner, Liz Sroka – assistant engineering
- Eddy Schreyer – mastering at Future Disc, California

== Chart performance ==
Chart (1994)	Peak position
Austrian Albumsv(Ö3 Austria)	29
Dutch Albums (Album Top 100)	45
German Albums (Offizielle Top 100)	35
Scottish Albums (Official Charts)	38
Swedish Albums (Sverigetopplistan)	38
UK Albums (OCC)	25

Chart (2020)	Peak position
Belgian Albums (Ultratop Wallonia)	164

== Certifications ==
Region	Certification	Certified units/sales
Australia (ARIA)	Gold	35,000^{^}
United Kingdom (BPI)	Gold	100,000^{‡}
^{^} Shipments figures based on certification alone.^{‡} Sales+streaming figures based on certification alone.
