= Dave McClain (drummer) =

American drummer (born 1965)

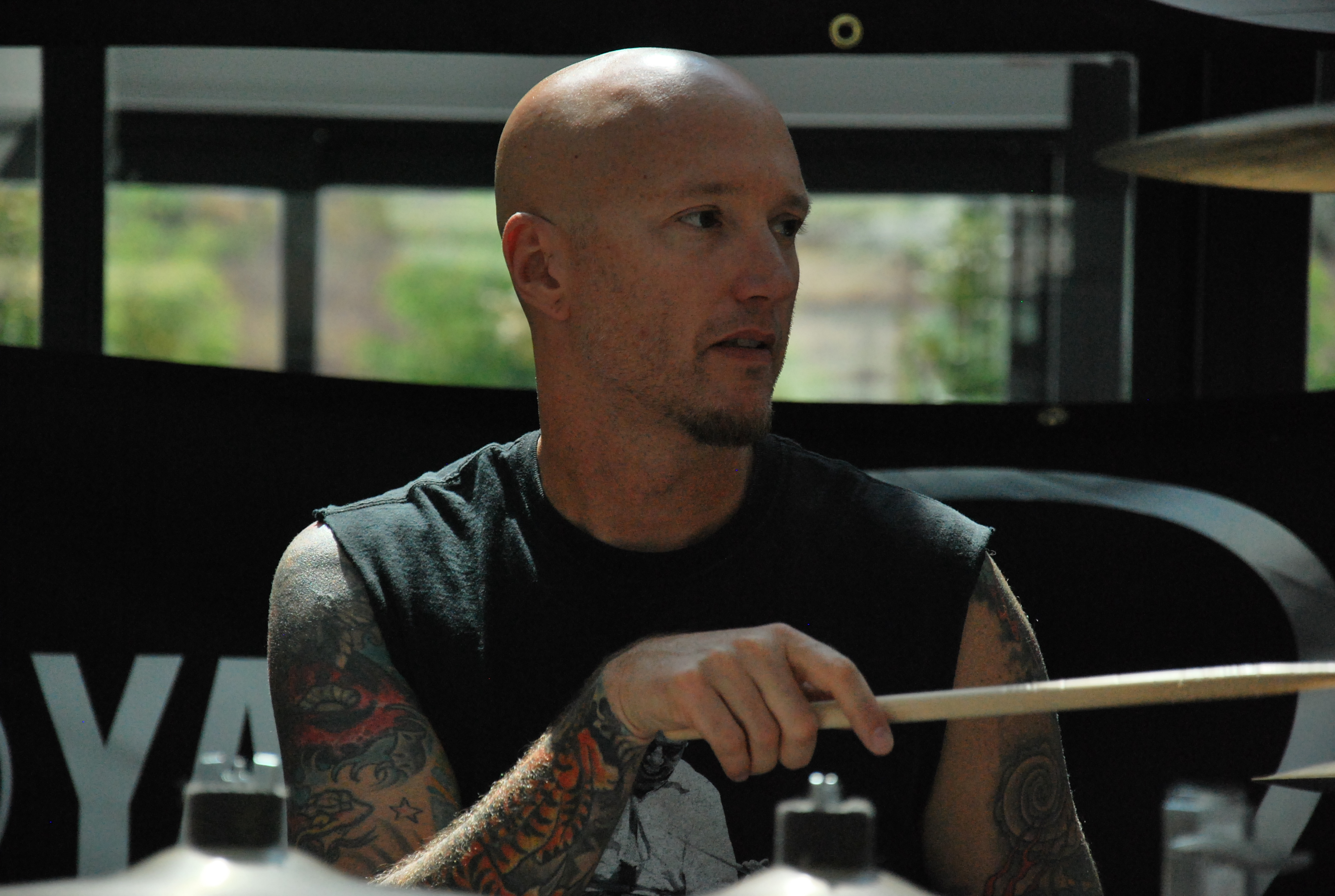
- McClain in 2010

Background information
- Born: David Wayne McClain; October 22, 1965 (age 60); Frankfurt am Main, West Germany
- Origin: San Antonio, Texas, U.S.
- Genres: Thrash metal, groove metal, heavy metal
- Occupation: Drummer
- Formerly of: S.A. Slayer, Juggernaut, Machine Head, Sacred Reich

David Wayne McClain (born October 22, 1965) is an American drummer. He is best known as the former drummer for the heavy metal band Machine Head. He joined the band in 1995 and left the band in 2018 after 23 years in the band. He replaced Chris Kontos when the latter left shortly after their first album, Burn My Eyes. He was formerly a member of S.A. Slayer, Riot offshoot Narita, Turbin, Catalepsy, Murdercar (featuring producer Ross Robinson), Ministers of Anger (Dave Clemmons). He rejoined Sacred Reich in 2018, which he had already played for from 1991 to 1995. He announced his departure in October 2025.

McClain has been a vegan since 2017.

== Endorsements ==
He currently endorses Remo drumheads, Yamaha drums and hardware and Zildjian cymbals. He also uses Zildjian Dave McClain signature Drumsticks. He previously endorsed Tama, Pearl and DDrum.

== Discography ==
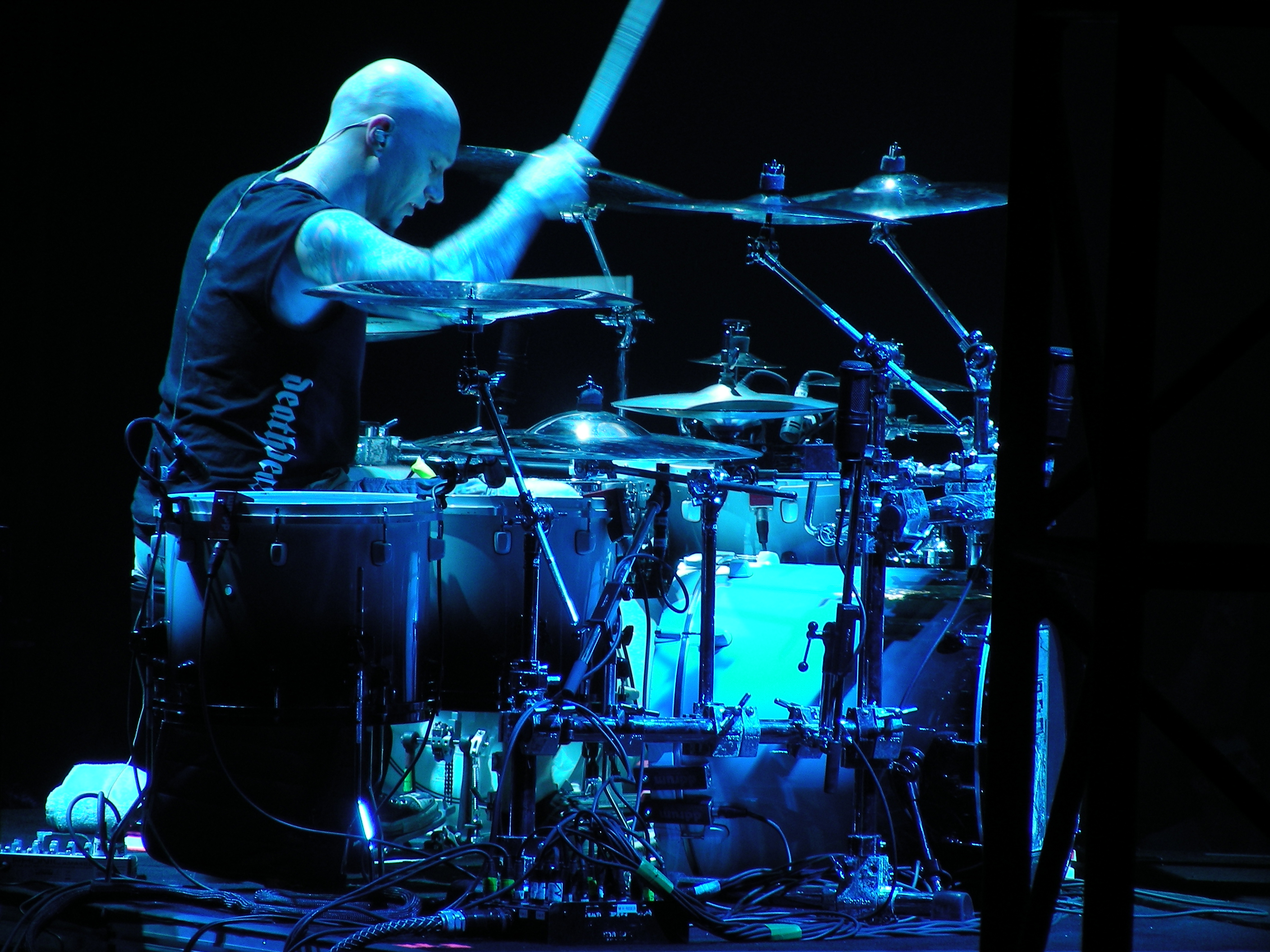
McClain performing in 2009

=== Albums and EPs ===
S.A. Slayer

- Prepare to Die EP (Rainforest Records, 1983)
- Go for the Throat (Under den Linden Records, 1988)

Murdercar

- unreleased album (1990)

Sacred Reich

- A Question EP (Hollywood Records, 1991)
- Independent (Hollywood Records, 1993)
- Heal (Metal Blade Records 1996)
- Awakening (Metal Blade Records, 2019)

Machine Head

- The More Things Change... (Roadrunner Records, 1997)
- The Burning Red (Roadrunner Records, 1999)
- Supercharger (Roadrunner Records, 2001)
- Through the Ashes of Empires (Roadrunner Records, 2003)
- The Blackening (Roadrunner Records, 2007)
- Unto the Locust (Roadrunner Records, 2011)
- Bloodstone & Diamonds (Nuclear Blast, 2014)
- Catharsis (Nuclear Blast, 2018)

Compilations

- with Juggernaut

In the Blood of Virgins, Metal Massacre VII (Metal Blade Records, 1986)

- with Murdercar

Mirage of Blood, Metal Massacre X (Metal Blade Records, 1989)

- with Ministers of Anger

The Great Escape, Metal Massacre XI (Metal Blade Records, 1991)
