= Adam Duce =

American bassist

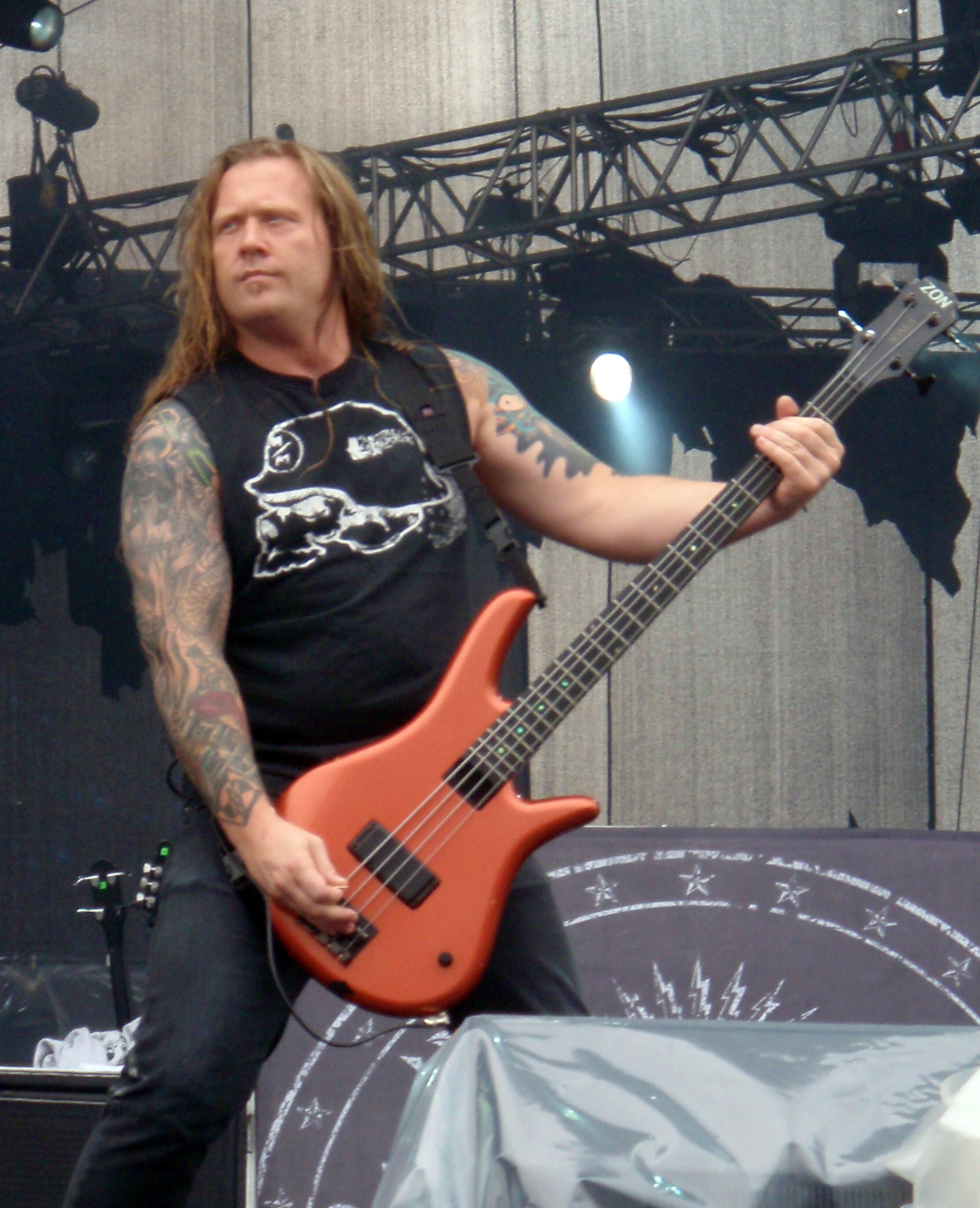
- Duce with Machine Head at Sonisphere Festival 2009

Background information
- Born: April 14, 1972 (age 54)
- Genres: Groove metal, thrash metal, nu metal
- Occupation: Musician
- Instrument: Bass
- Years active: 1991–2013
- Member of: Sintanic
- Formerly of: Machine Head

Adam Duce (born April 14, 1972) is an American musician, best known as a founding member and former bassist of the heavy metal band Machine Head. He played in the band for over 21 years before his firing in 2013.

== Biography ==
While still a child, Duce was often sent to rehabilitation institutes by his parents; later in life he got involved with drugs, even spending periods in drug rehab because of drug overdoses. At the age of 11, he was sent to a reform school in Texas for two years. He explained the reason for this in an interview: "I had too much energy for my body to contain." In that school, he lost touch with the outside world's art, especially music.

He was introduced to rock music with AC/DC's album For Those About to Rock We Salute You.

He has been a close friend with former Machine Head guitarist Logan Mader since childhood. After getting out of the reform school, Mader introduced him to metal music with bands such as Slayer, Metallica, Exodus, King Diamond, Celtic Frost and Sacrilege B.C.

Around 1987, Duce and Mader both decided to start playing the guitar, but after several unsuccessful attempts at forming a band, Mader persuaded him to play bass instead, since at the time they could not find a bassist. Duce accepted, and he became the bassist in what would become Machine Head.

== Machine Head ==
Duce met Robb Flynn through a common friend when he was 16, and they later became roommates. At the time, Flynn was playing in the Bay Area thrash metal band Vio-lence.

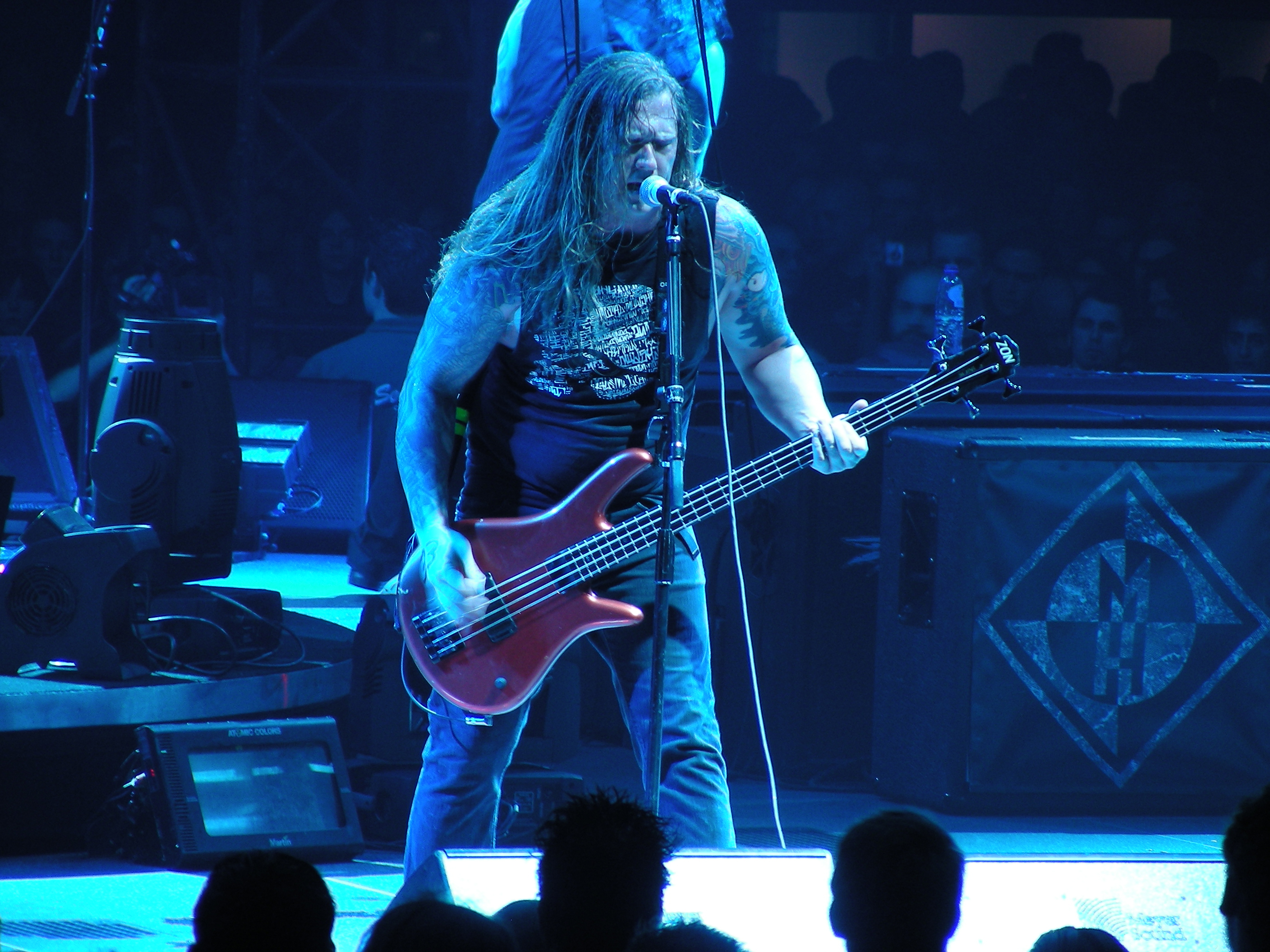
Duce with Machine Head opening for Metallica at Rotterdam, 2009

Flynn left Vio-lence and formed a new band – Machine Head, consisting of Duce, guitarist Logan Mader and drummer Tony Costanza.

Duce played bass and did the backing vocals for all the Machine Head albums between the first (1994's Burn My Eyes) and seventh albums (2011's Unto the Locust) and participated in all of the band's tours until 2012. He also has several appearances in live shows as a bassist for Roadrunner United.

Duce did not fully participate in the creative process for the songs for Unto the Locust. In an interview, he admitted that he wrote several riffs and lyrics that got rejected by Robb Flynn, which led to further disagreements between him and the band. These disagreements were later pointed out as the reason for the band to fire him.

On February 22, 2013, Machine Head announced that the band and Duce were parting ways. Flynn later explained in an emotional message on the band's website that the band had fired Duce.

On January 21, 2014, Duce filed a lawsuit against Machine Head's then-remaining members (Flynn, Phil Demmel and Dave McClain) and manager in Federal Court, alleging trademark infringement, breach of partnership agreement and defamation, among other things. On July 4, 2014, a post was published on Machine Head's official Facebook page that the lawsuit had been settled.

== Musical style and influences ==
Duce points out that his main influences come from bass players such as Cliff Burton, Geezer Butler, Steve Harris, although he plays bass using a pick rather than fingers.

== Discography ==
With Machine Head

- Burn My Eyes (1994)
- The More Things Change... (1997)
- The Burning Red (1999)
- Supercharger (2001)
- Through the Ashes of Empires (2003)
- The Blackening (2007)
- Unto the Locust (2011)
