= Robb Flynn =

American guitarist and vocalist (born 1967)

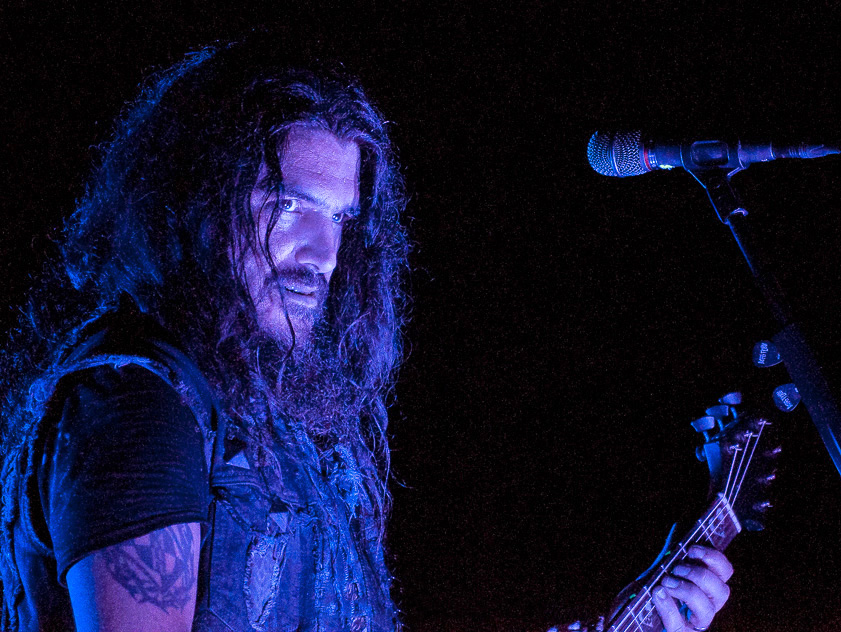
- Flynn performing with Machine Head in 2015

Background information
- Born: Lawrence Matthew Cardine; July 19, 1967 (age 59); Oakland, California, U.S.
- Genres: Thrash metal; groove metal; alternative metal; nu metal
- Occupations: Musician; songwriter; producer
- Instruments: Guitar; vocals
- Years active: 1985–present
- Member of: Machine Head
- Formerly of: Vio-lence; Forbidden

Robert Conrad Flynn (born Lawrence Matthew Cardine; July 19, 1967) is an American musician best known as the lead vocalist and rhythm guitarist for heavy metal band Machine Head, being the only member to feature on every album. Flynn formed the band along with Adam Duce, Logan Mader and Tony Costanza after leaving Bay Area thrash band Vio-lence.

== Early life and influences ==
Flynn was born Lawrence Matthew Cardine in Oakland, California. He cites Black Sabbath as his biggest influence and the reason he plays guitar. Other influences include Bay Area thrash metal bands like Exodus, Metallica, Slayer and hardcore punk/crossover thrash groups such as Dead Kennedys, D.R.I., and Suicidal Tendencies.

== Career ==
Flynn joined the thrash metal band Forbidden (originally Forbidden Evil), while in his graduating year at American High School. He played in this band from 1985 to 1987. He wrote four songs that appeared on their debut album, "Chalice of Blood", "Forbidden Evil", "As Good as Dead", and part of "March into Fire", but left before an album was released to join local thrash metal rivals Vio-lence, alongside Phil Demmel. After an altercation with gang members that resulted in death threats towards the band, Flynn quit Vio-lence and went on to form Machine Head, which released its debut album Burn My Eyes in 1994; he would later retell the incident in the song "Triple Beam" on Catharsis.

In January 2005, he was selected as one of the four team captains of Roadrunner United, an act to celebrate the 25th anniversary of Roadrunner Records. Flynn wrote, produced and recorded guitar on four songs, these were "The Rich Man", "Independent (Voice of the Voiceless)", "Army of the Sun" and "The Dagger" and on the latter he sang and wrote lyrics alongside Howard Jones of Killswitch Engage.

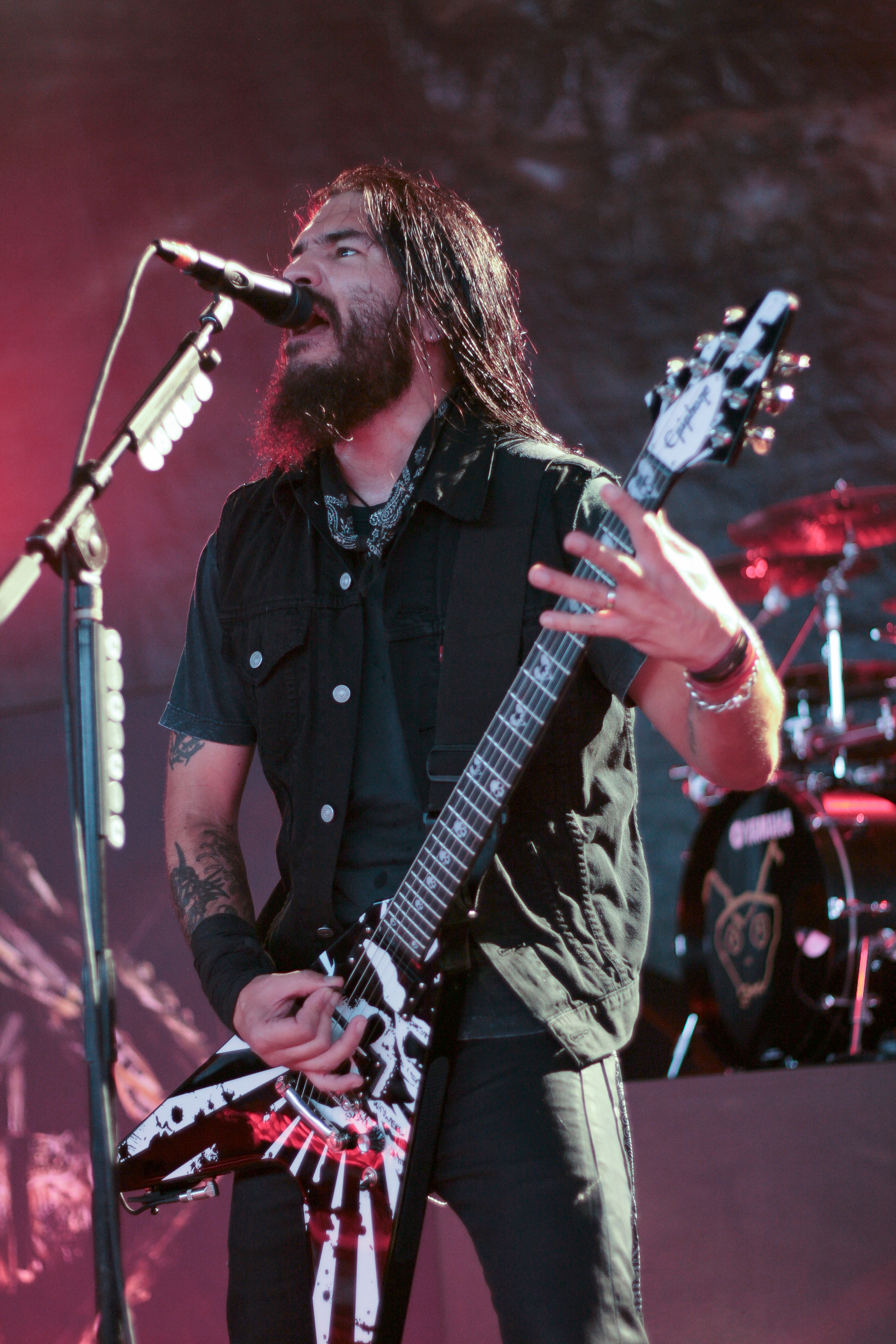
Flynn with Machine Head in 2011

Machine Head's album The Blackening (2007) climbed to number 54 on the US Billboard after appearing on the charts only two weeks previously; it was also nominated for a Grammy Award, making it by far the band's most successful album. On June 11, 2007, Flynn received the Metal Hammer 2007 Golden God Award. In honor of Debbie Abono and Ronnie James Dio, Flynn recorded and released for free online a cover of Black Sabbath's "Die Young". Abono managed Flynn and Phil Demmel when they were members of Vio-lence.

In December 2013, Flynn and fellow Machine Head guitarist Phil Demmel collaborated with online education site JamPlay.com to put together a series of guitar lessons for aspiring guitarists and members of JamPlay.

Flynn had a break-in at his house in which several items, including guitars, were stolen. One guitar, the Washburn 333 or "Dimebolt", was given to him by Dimebag Darrell. In 2016, the "Dimebolt" guitar was returned to Flynn. Machine Head debuted at number 22 on the Billboard 200 chart, with Unto the Locust the band's highest performance. They also debuted at number 5 on the German music chart. The album has sold over 100,000 copies in the United States.

Between 2020 and 2022—during the COVID-19 pandemic—Flynn hosted the "No Fuckin' Regrets" podcast on the GaS Digital Network.

== Personal life ==
Flynn is married and has two sons. He is an atheist. He has talked extensively about his mental health issues, especially during The More Things Change... era of Machine Head, and has admitted to suffering from depression, substance abuse, self-harm, suicidal ideation and bulimia. He was a victim of child sexual abuse at the age of five, and had intense cluster headaches as a result of the trauma; he wrote the songs "Five" on The Burning Red and "Trephination" on Supercharger about the experience, but refuses to perform them live.

== Equipment ==
Flynn used two Ibanez strat styled guitars in the early days of Machine Head, a white one used in 1992 until 1993, and a black one covered with stickers which he used to record Burn My Eyes, which was stolen from his home in 2010 along with a Washburn Dimebolt which Dimebag Darrell had once given to him. For the Burn My Eyes tour he used a Gibson Explorer and a Jackson Soloist. He used these guitars for The More Things Change..., after which he switched to a Gibson SG. His Dimebolt and all the guitars that were stolen were returned to him by a woman who bought a storage unit for $10.

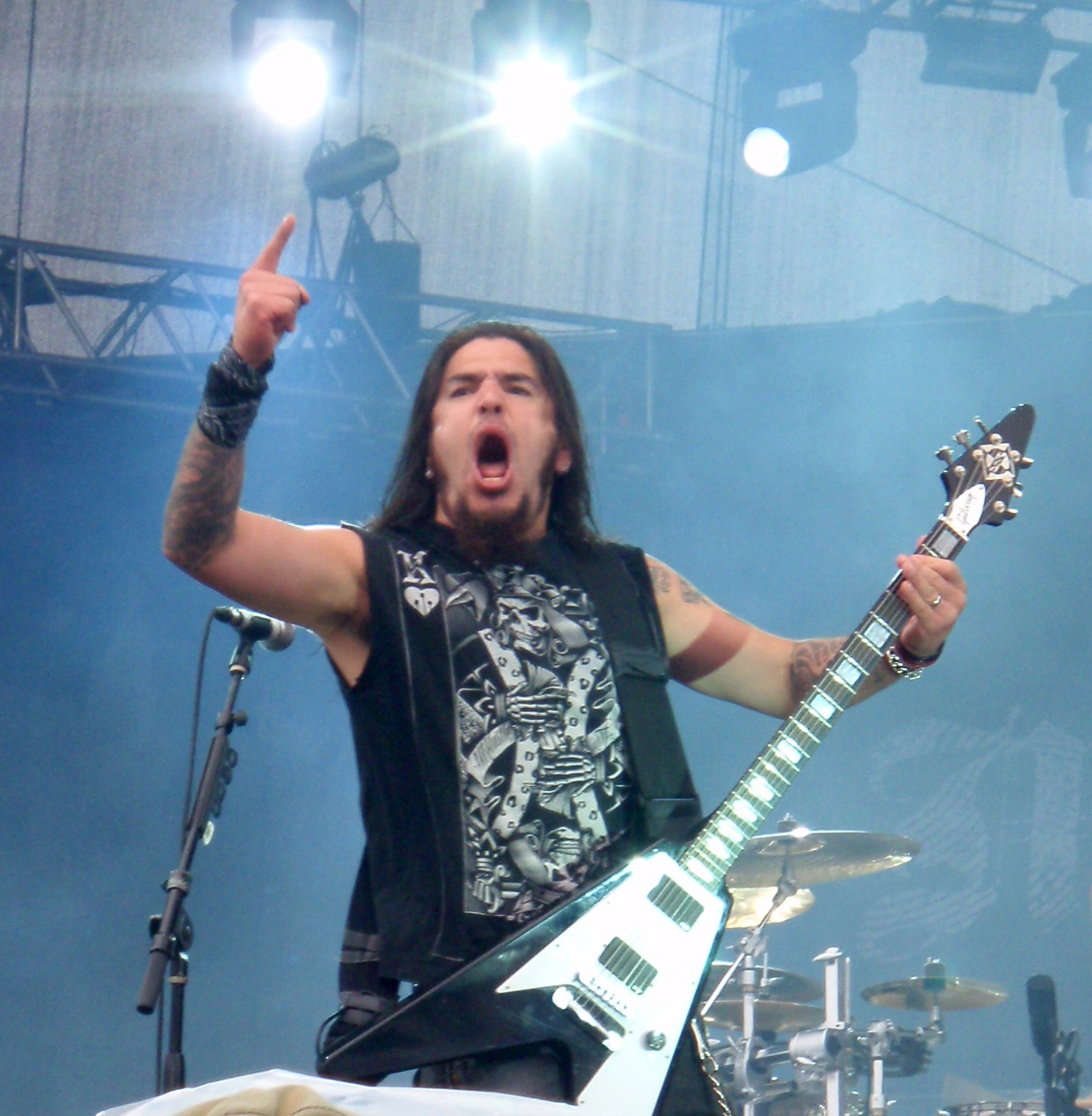
Flynn at Sonisphere Festival 2009

For The Burning Red, he began using a Gibson Flying V, which became synonymous with him after this period. In 2002, just before the recording of Through the Ashes of Empires he began using his ESP SP210 baritone guitar. For The Blackening tour he used a custom ESP flying V which was identical to, and often mistaken for a Gibson V. By Unto the Locust he was using a more modified version of his earlier ESP/Gibson V, with this one having mirror inlays of the Machine Head logo on the fretboard and headstock.

Flynn had signed a deal with Epiphone in which he could get signature models based closely on his designs with ESP. His new guitar for this period was the Epiphone Love Death Baritone Flying V, along with a custom Explorer, which he occasionally used on the Locust tour. For the Bloodstone & Diamonds era, Flynn has so far been using several Epiphone Flying V's, including an alternate version of the Love Death V, with this one having a tremolo bar. Currently he uses both his Love Death models, a satin black V, and a glossy black V with white binding and a white pickguard.

In January 2015, Flynn posted a picture on his Instagram page, showing his red B.C. Rich Warlock along with his Gibson SG from 1997, announcing that he was bringing them out of retirement and bringing them on the US leg of the Bloodstone & Diamonds tour.

Other gear includes a modified Peavey 5150 and an Electro-Harmonix Deluxe Electric Mistress flanger pedal.
