= List of longest gaps between studio albums =

List of albums

This is a list of the longest gaps of time between the release date of consecutive studio albums. To appear on the list, the album must have been officially released at least a decade (to the day) after their predecessor. This list should only contain studio albums; it should not include extended plays, soundtracks, remixes, releases from various artists and compilations or greatest hits albums.

== 40 years or more ==
Artist	Previous album	Released	Subsequent album	Released	Time between releases	Ref(s)
Dean Gitter	Ghost Ballads	1957	Old Folkies Never Die	2014	57 years	
Napoleon XIV	They're Coming to Take Me Away, Ha-Haaa!	1966	For God's Sake, Stop the Feces! (Note: Posthumous album)	20 April 2023	57 years	
Jack Scott	What in the World's Come Over You	1960	Way to Survive	October 2015	55 years	
MC5	High Time	16 July 1971	Heavy Lifting	18 October 2024	53 years, 3 months, 2 days	
Alice Cooper	Muscle of Love	20 November 1973	The Revenge of Alice Cooper	25 July 2025	51 years, 8 months, 6 days	
Fresh Maggots	Fresh Maggots	October 1971	Waiting for the Sun	31 October 2020	49 years	
Rainbow Ffolly	Sallies Fforth	May 1968	Ffollow Up!	July 2016	48 years, 2 months	
Space Waltz	Space Waltz by Alastair Riddell	May 1975	Victory	May 2023	48 years	
The Sonics	Introducing the Sonics	1967	This Is the Sonics	27 March 2015	48 years	
Gloria Scott	What Am I Gonna Do	November 1974	So Wonderful	30 September 2022	47 years, 10 months	
Harry Taussig	Fate Is Only Once	1965	Fate Is Only Twice	2012	47 years	
Kossoy Sisters	Bowling Green	1956	Hop on Pretty Girls	2002	46 years	
Lavender Country	Lavender Country	1973	Blackberry Rose and Other Songs and Sorrows	30 June 2019	46 years	
The Standells	Try It	October 1967	Bump	9 August 2013	45 years, 10 months	
Shakti	Natural Elements	November 1977	This Moment	23 June 2023	45 years, 7 months	
Casa das Máquinas	Casa de Rock	December 1976	Brilho nos Olhos	15 April 2022	45 years, 4 months	
July	July	1968	Resurrection	2013	45 years	
Kathy and Carol	Kathy and Carol	1965	Keepsake	2010	45 years	
Ave Sangria	Ave Sangria	June 1974	Vendavais	26 April 2019	44 years, 10 months	
Donna Loren	Beach Blanket Bingo	7 April 1965	Love It Away	30 January 2010	44 years, 9 months	
Linda Hoyle	Pieces of Me	1971	The Fetch	17 August 2015	44 years	
Fanny	Rock and Roll Survivors	1974	Fanny Walked the Earth	2018	44 years	
Linda Perhacs	Parallelograms	1 April 1970	The Soul of All Natural Things	4 March 2014	43 years, 11 months	
Shuggie Otis	Inspiration Information	October 1974	Inter-Fusion	20 April 2018	43 years, 6 months	
Strawberry Alarm Clock	Good Morning Starshine	May 1969	Wake Up Where You Are	May 2012	43 years	
Emitt Rhodes	Farewell to Paradise	1973	Rainbow Ends	26 February 2016	43 years	
Atomic Rooster	Headline News	June 1983	Circle the Sun	25 October 2025	42 years, 4 months	
Shelagh McDonald	Stargazer	1971	Parnassus Revisited	2013	42 years	
Haircut One Hundred	Paint and Paint	6 July 1984	Boxing the Compass	19 June 2026	41 years, 11 months, 13 days	
White Spirit	White Spirit	19 September 1980	Right or Wrong	29 July 2022	41 years, 10 months, 10 days	
Tír na nÓg	Strong in the Sun	26 October 1973	The Dark Dance	24 May 2015	41 years, 6 months, 28 days	
Gryphon	Treason	April 1977	ReInvention	September 2018	41 years, 5 months	
Nathaniel Mayer	Going Back to the Village of Love	1963	I Just Want to Be Held	2004	41 years	
Bob Lind	Since There Were Circles	1971	Finding You Again	2012	41 years	
Shirley Collins	Amaranth	August 1976	Lodestar	4 November 2016	40 years, 3 months	
Heavy Load	Stronger Than Evil	1 October 1983	Riders of the Ancient Storm	6 October 2023	40 years, 6 days	

== 30–39 years ==
Artist	Previous album	Released	Subsequent album	Released	Time between releases	Ref(s)
ABBA	The Visitors	30 November 1981	Voyage	5 November 2021	39 years, 11 months, 7 days	
Harry Nilsson	Flash Harry	5 January 1980	Losst and Founnd	22 November 2019	39 years, 10 months, 17 days	
Areski Belkacem	Un beau matin	1 January 1971	Le Triomphe de l'amour	25 October 2010	39 years, 9 months, 24 days	
Altered Images	Bite	17 June 1983	Mascara Streakz	26 August 2022	39 years, 2 months, 10 days	
The Vapors	Magnets	9 March 1981	Together	15 May 2020	39 years, 2 months, 6 days	
Coven	Blood on the Snow	1974	Jinx	2013	39 years	
Witch	Kuomboka	1984	Zango	2 June 2023	39 years	
Bob Weir	Heaven Help the Fool	13 January 1978	Blue Mountain	30 September 2016	38 years, 8 months, 18 days	
KaS Product	Ego Eye	1 October 1986	Reloaded	11 April 2025	38 years, 6 months, 11 days	
John Lodge	Natural Avenue	28 January 1977	10,000 Light Years Ago	5 May 2015	38 years, 3 months, 7 days	
Comus	To Keep from Crying	1974	Out of the Coma	13 April 2012	38 years	
Curved Air	Airborne	1976	North Star	7 March 2014	38 years	
Bridges	Fakkeltog	1980	Våkenatt	15 August 2018	38 years	
Lone Justice	Shelter	November 1986	Viva Lone Justice	25 October 2024	37 years, 11 months	
Chuck Berry	Rockit	August 1979	Chuck	9 June 2017	37 years, 10 months	
Soft Machine	Land of Cockayne	March 1981	Hidden Details	7 September 2018	37 years, 6 months, 7 days	
Parliament	Trombipulation	5 December 1980	Medicaid Fraud Dogg	22 May 2018	37 years, 5 months, 17 days	
Granicus	Granicus	1 October 1973	Thieves, Liars, And Traitors	8 November 2010	37 years, 1 month, 7 days	
Marva Whitney	It's My Thing	1969	I Am What I Am	December 2006	37 years	
Paul Jones	Crucifix on a Horseshoe	1972	Starting All Over Again	2009	37 years	
John Cafferty and the Beaver Brown Band	Roadhouse	18 May 1988	Sound of Waves	11 April 2025	36 years, 10 months, 25 days	
Savage Grace	After the Fall from Grace	2 July 1986	Sign of the Cross	5 May 2023	36 years, 10 months, 3 days	
The Rezillos	Can't Stand the Rezillos	21 July 1978	Zero	10 March 2015	36 years, 7 months, 18 days	
Danny Elfman	So-Lo	November 1984	Big Mess	11 June 2021	36 years, 7 months	
Lou Gramm	Long Hard Look	16 October 1989	Released	27 March 2026	36 years, 5 months, 11 days	
Regis Philbin	It's Time for Regis!	1968	When You're Smiling	28 September 2004	36 years	
William Shatner	The Transformed Man	1968	Has Been	5 October 2004	36 years	
Plastic Ono Band	Feeling the Space	2 November 1973	Between My Head and the Sky	21 September 2009	35 years, 10 months, 19 days	
The Boomtown Rats	In the Long Grass	May 1984	Citizens of Boomtown	13 March 2020	35 years, 10 months	
The Yardbirds	Little Games	July 1967	Birdland	April 2003	35 years, 9 months	
The Beat	Special Beat Service	1 October 1982	Here We Go Love	15 June 2018	35 years, 8 months, 12 days	
Flower Travellin' Band	Make Up	25 February 1973	We Are Here	17 September 2008	35 years, 6 months, 4 days	
Bonzo Dog Doo-Dah Band	Let's Make Up and Be Friendly	1972	Pour l'Amour des Chiens	12 December 2007	35 years	
Sir Lord Baltimore	Sir Lord Baltimore	1971	Sir Lord Baltimore III Raw	July 2006	35 years	
Sweet Pea Atkinson	Don't Walk Away	1982	Get What You Deserve	2017	35 years	
The Pop Group	For How Much Longer Do We Tolerate Mass Murder?	21 March 1980	Citizen Zombie	23 February 2015	34 years, 11 months, 2 days	
Vashti Bunyan	Just Another Diamond Day	20 December 1970	Lookaftering	17 October 2005	34 years, 9 months, 27 days	
Sword	Sweet Dreams	1 February 1988	III	25 November 2022	34 years, 9 months, 24 days	
Vandenberg	Alibi	26 August 1985	2020	29 May 2020	34 years, 9 months, 3 days	
Cymande	Arrival	11 March 1981	A Simple Act of Faith	27 November 2015	34 years, 8 months, 16 days	
Dark Angel	Time Does Not Heal	19 February 1991	Extinction Level Event	5 September 2025	34 years, 6 months, 14 days	
Antisect	In Darkness There Is No Choice	6 September 1983	The Rising of the Lights	13 October 2017	34 years, 1 month, 7 days	
The Stooges	Raw Power	7 February 1973	The Weirdness	6 March 2007	34 years, 27 days	
Bill Fay	Time of the Last Persecution	1971	Tomorrow, Tomorrow & Tomorrow	2005	34 years	
The Scientists	The Human Jukebox	1987	Negativity	11 June 2021	34 years	
Atrophy	Violent by Nature	26 March 1990	Asylum	15 March 2024	33 years, 11 months, 18 days	
Alcatrazz	Dangerous Games	21 August 1986	Born Innocent	31 July 2020	33 years, 11 months, 10 days	
The Babys	On the Edge	October 1980	I'll Have Some of That	24 June 2014	33 years, 8 months	
Quartz	Against All Odds	1 June 1983	Fear No Evil	28 October 2016	33 years, 4 months, 27 days	
The Boys	Boys Only	30 January 1981	Punk Rock Menopause	20 June 2014	33 years, 4 months, 21 days	
Madam X	We Reserve the Right	28 October 1984	Monstrocity	31 October 2017	33 years, 3 days	
Gastunk	Mother	21 June 1988	Vintage Spirit, The Fact	9 June 2021	32 years, 11 months, 20 days	
Toxik	Think This	13 October 1989	Dis Morta	5 August 2022	32 years, 9 months, 23 days	
Possessed	Beyond the Gates	31 October 1986	Revelations of Oblivion	10 May 2019	32 years, 6 months, 10 days	
Labelle	Chameleon	17 June 1976	Back to Now	21 October 2008	32 years, 4 months, 4 days	
New York Dolls	Too Much Too Soon	10 May 1974	One Day It Will Please Us to Remember Even This	26 July 2006	32 years, 2 months, 16 days	
Loop	A Gilded Eternity	22 January 1990	Sonancy	25 March 2022	32 years, 2 months, 3 days	
Coroner	Grin	10 September 1993	Dissonance Theory	17 October 2025	32 years, 1 month, 7 days	
Barry Gibb	Now Voyager	September 1984	In the Now	7 October 2016	32 years, 1 month	
The Spinners	Down to Business	18 August 1989	'Round the Block and Back Again	27 August 2021	32 years, 9 days	
Propaganda	1234	May 1990	The Heart Is Strange	May 2022	32 years	
Noiseworks	Love Versus Money	1 July 1991	Evolution	11 November 2022	31 years, 4 months, 10 days	
Strange Boutique	The Kindest Worlds	1 June 1994	Let the Lonely Heart Sing	10 June 2025	31 years, 9 days	
The Farm	Hullabaloo	10 May 1994	Let the Music (Take Control)	2 May 2025	30 years, 11 months, 22 days	
Naked Raygun	Raygun...Naked Raygun	31 October 1990	Over the Overlords	2 August 2021	30 years, 9 months, 2 days	
Vardis	Vigilante	1986	Red Eye	20 May 2016	30 years, 5 months, 20 days	
Visage	Beat Boy	22 October 1984	Hearts and Knives	20 May 2013	30 years, 5 months, 3 days	
Magazine	Magic, Murder and the Weather	June 1981	No Thyself	24 October 2011	30 years, 4 months	
Team Dresch	Captain My Captain	4 June 1996	Furthermore	18 September 2026	30 years, 3 months, 14 days	
Corpus Delicti	Obsessions	18 September 1995	Liminal	28 November 2025	30 years, 2 months, 10 days	
Betty Boo	GRRR! It's Betty Boo	1992	Boomerang	2022	30 years	
Drop Nineteens	National Coma	1993	Hard Light	3 November 2023	30 years	
Joe Pesci	Little Joe Sure Can Sing!	1968	Vincent LaGuardia Gambini Sings Just for You	13 October 1998	30 years	

== 20–29 years ==
Artist	Previous album	Released	Subsequent album	Released	Time between releases	Ref(s)
Sublime	Sublime	30 July 1996	Until the Sun Explodes	12 June 2026	29 years, 10 months, 14 days	
Deadguy	Fixation on a Co-Worker	20 November 1995	Near-Death Travel Services	27 June 2025	29 years, 7 months, 7 days	
Acid Reign	Obnoxious	30 April 1990	The Age of Entitlement	27 September 2019	29 years, 4 months, 27 days	
Heavenly	Operation Heavenly	8 October 1996	Highway to Heavenly	27 February 2026	29 years, 4 months, 19 days	
Heir Apparent	One Small Voice	1 June 1989	The View from Below	15 October 2018	29 years, 4 months, 14 days	
Fifth Angel	Time Will Tell	23 August 1989	The Third Secret	26 October 2018	29 years, 2 months, 3 days	
The Psychedelic Furs	World Outside	30 July 1991	Made of Rain	31 July 2020	29 years, 1 day	
Dick Dale	Summer Surf	1964	Tribal Thunder	May 1993	29 years	
Doris Day	Doris Day's Sentimental Journey	12 July 1965	The Love Album (Note: Originally recorded in 1967)	1994	29 years	
The Creation	We Are Paintermen	June 1967	Power Surge	1996	29 years	
Silver Apples	Contact	23 February 1969	Beacon	1998	29 years	
The Free Design	There Is a Song	1972	Cosmic Peekaboo	2001	29 years	
The Dream Syndicate	Ghost Stories	1988	How Did I Find Myself Here?	2017	29 years	
Game Theory	Two Steps from the Middle Ages	1988	Supercalifragile	August 2017	29 years	
Cicero	Future Boy	1992	Today	2021	29 years	
Some Velvet Sidewalk	Generate!	1997	Critters Encore	26 June 2026	29 years	
Cirith Ungol	Paradise Lost	23 August 1991	Forever Black	24 April 2020	28 years, 8 months, 1 day	
Paul Stanley	Paul Stanley	18 September 1978	Live to Win	24 October 2006	28 years, 1 month, 6 days	
Eagles	The Long Run	24 September 1979	Long Road Out of Eden	30 October 2007	28 years, 1 month, 6 days	
Black Flag	In My Head	October 1985	What The...	5 November 2013	28 years, 1 month	
Lawnmower Deth	Billy	25 January 1994	Blunt Cutters	28 January 2022	28 years, 3 days	
The Slits	Return of the Giant Slits	October 1981	Trapped Animal	6 October 2009	28 years	
Missing Persons	Color in Your Life	July 1986	Missing in Action	2014	28 years	
The Yummy Fur	Sexy World	1998	Everybody Talks About the Weather	25 September 2026	28 years	
Cat Stevens	Back to Earth	3 December 1978	An Other Cup (Note: as Yusuf)	14 November 2006	27 years, 11 months, 12 days	
Animotion	Animotion	21 February 1989	Raise Your Expectations	2 December 2016	27 years, 9 months, 11 days	
Pinhead Gunpowder	Goodbye Ellston Avenue	25 February 1997	Unt	18 October 2024	27 years, 7 months, 24 days	
Van der Graaf Generator	The Quiet Zone/The Pleasure Dome	2 September 1977	Present	25 April 2005	27 years, 7 months, 23 days	
The Olivia Tremor Control	Black Foliage: Animation Music Volume One	23 March 1999	The Same Place	23 October 2026	27 years, 7 months	
Exhorder	The Law	15 March 1992	Mourn the Southern Skies	20 September 2019	27 years, 6 months, 5 days	
Big Star	Third/Sister Lovers	18 March 1978	In Space	27 September 2005	27 years, 6 months, 4 days	
Even as We Speak	Feral Pop Frenzy	2 February 1993	Adelphi	24 July 2020	27 years, 5 months, 3 days	
The Alan Parsons Project	Gaudi	January 1987	The Sicilian Defence (Note: Originally recorded in 1979)	23 March 2014	27 years, 2 months	
Mordred	The Next Room	June 1994	The Dark Parade	23 July 2021	27 years, 1 month	
Gary Wilson	You Think You Really Know Me	1977	Mary Had Brown Hair	2004	27 years	
The Names	Swimming	1982	Monsters Next Door	13 April 2009	27 years	
Power of Dreams	Become Yourself	1994	Aüslander	30 July 2021	27 years	
EMF	Cha Cha Cha	1995	Go Go Sapiens	1 April 2022	27 years	
Spratleys	Pony (Note: as Spratleys Japs)	1999	Bloom	21 June 2026	27 years	
X	Hey Zeus!	8 June 1993	Alphabetland	22 April 2020	26 years, 10 months, 14 days	
Messiah	Underground	1 January 1994	Fracmont	11 September 2020	26 years, 9 months, 11 days	
Tom Rapp	Sunforest	2 January 1973	A Journal of the Plague Year	27 September 1999	26 years, 8 months, 26 days	
Dexys Midnight Runners	Don't Stand Me Down	13 September 1985	One Day I'm Going to Soar	4 June 2012	26 years, 8 months, 23 days	
Crimson Glory	Astronomica	10 August 1999	Chasing the Hydra	17 April 2026	26 years, 8 months, 7 days	
Chic	Chic-ism	3 March 1992	It's About Time	28 September 2018	26 years, 6 months, 25 days	
Firefall	Messenger	1 June 1994	Comet	11 December 2020	26 years, 6 months, 10 days	
Thee Headcoatees	Here Comes the Cessation	1 June 1999	Man-Trap	14 November 2025	26 years, 5 months, 13 days	
Satan	Suspended Sentence	1 January 1987	Life Sentence	29 April 2013	26 years, 4 months, 29 days	
The Jesus Lizard	Blue	21 April 1998	Rack	13 September 2024	26 years, 4 months, 24 days	
Cabaret Voltaire	The Conversation	July 1994	Shadow of Fear	20 November 2020	26 years, 4 months	
The Wailers Band	Jah Message	1 May 1994	One World	21 August 2020	26 years, 3 months, 20 days	
Cardiacs	Guns	21 June 1999	LSD	19 September 2025	26 years, 2 months, 29 days	
Funkadelic	The Electric Spanking of War Babies	14 April 1981	By Way of the Drum	15 May 2007	26 years, 1 month, 1 day	
Slick Rick	The Art of Storytelling	25 May 1999	Victory	13 June 2025	26 years, 19 days	
The Trudy	Tune-In to the Trudy Love-Ray!	1990	Always Never Beautiful Forever	15 April 2016	26 years	
Stray Cats	Original Cool	26 May 1993	40	24 May 2019	25 years, 11 months, 28 days	
Angel Witch	Frontal Assault	6 April 1986	As Above, So Below	12 March 2012	25 years, 11 months, 6 days	
Gene Simmons	Gene Simmons	18 September 1978	Asshole	8 June 2004	25 years, 8 months, 21 days	
Duff McKagan	Believe in Me	28 September 1993	Tenderness	31 May 2019	25 years, 8 months, 4 days	
Viking	Man of Straw	8 August 1989	No Child Left Behind	4 March 2015	25 years, 6 months, 24 days	
Exile	Justice	25 June 1991	Wrapped Up in Your Arms for Christmas	21 October 2016	25 years, 3 months, 26 days	
Xysma	Girl on the Beach	3 January 1998	No Place Like Alone	24 March 2023	25 years, 2 months, 21 days	
Radio Birdman	Living Eyes	1981	Zeno Beach	June 2006	25 years	
Levon Helm	Levon Helm	1982	Dirt Farmer	30 October 2007	25 years	
Witchfinder General	Friends of Hell	25 November 1983	Resurrected	30 August 2008	24 years, 9 months, 5 days	
Roger Waters	Amused to Death	1 September 1992	Is This the Life We Really Want?	2 June 2017	24 years, 8 months, 29 days	
Heavens Edge	Some Other Place, Some Other Time	24 August 1998	Get It Right	12 May 2023	24 years, 8 months, 18 days	
Exumer	Rising from the Sea	21 July 1987	Fire & Damnation	6 April 2012	24 years, 8 months, 16 days	
Bauhaus	Burning from the Inside	15 July 1983	Go Away White	3 March 2008	24 years, 7 months, 18 days	
Willa Ford	Willa Was Here	17 July 2001	Amanda	6 March 2026	24 years, 7 months, and 17 days	
The The	NakedSelf	29 February 2000	Ensoulment	6 September 2024	24 years, 6 months, 8 days	
Carissa's Wierd	Songs About Leaving	6 August 2002	Somewhere Further Than Far Away	8 January 2027	24 years, 5 months, 2 days	
Steve Perry	For the Love of Strange Medicine	19 July 1994	Traces	5 October 2018	24 years, 2 months, 16 days	
The Chameleons	Why Call It Anything	1 July 2001	Arctic Moon	12 September 2025	24 years, 2 months, 11 days	
The Who	It's Hard	4 September 1982	Endless Wire	30 October 2006	24 years, 1 month, 26 days	
Starship	Love Among the Cannibals	August 1989	Loveless Fascination	17 September 2013	24 years, 1 month	
The Sea Nymphs	The Sea Nymphs	1992	On the Dry Land	4 November 2016	24 years	
Seals and Crofts	The Longest Road	1980	Traces	2004	24 years	
The Softies	Holiday in Rhode Island	12 September 2000	The Bed I Made	23 August 2024	23 years, 11 months, 12 days	
The Cars	Door to Door	25 August 1987	Move Like This	10 May 2011	23 years, 8 months, 16 days	
Pulp	We Love Life	22 October 2001	More	6 June 2025	23 years, 7 months, 15 days	
Poltergeist	Nothing Lasts Forever	1 March 1993	Back to Haunt	21 October 2016	23 years, 7 months, 21 days	
Black Star	Mos Def & Talib Kweli Are Black Star	29 September 1998	No Fear of Time	3 May 2022	23 years, 7 months, 4 days	
Everything But the Girl	Temperamental	27 September 1999	Fuse	21 April 2023	23 years, 6 months, 26 days	
The Cruel Sea	Where There's Smoke	September 2001	Straight Into the Sun	7 March 2025	23 years, 6 months	
Sacred Reich	Heal	27 February 1996	Awakening	23 August 2019	23 years, 5 months, 24 days	
Xentrix	Scourge	1 January 1996	Bury the Pain	7 June 2019	23 years, 5 months, 7 days	
The Boo Radleys	Kingsize	19 October 1998	Keep On With Falling	11 March 2022	23 years, 4 months, 21 days	
Zebra	Zebra IV	8 July 2003	V	13 November 2026	23 years, 4 months, 5 days	
Olivia	Olivia	15 May 2001	You Are	30 August 2024	23 years, 3 months, 15 days	
Stepa	Stepa	30 July 2002	Icarus Flight	10 October 2025	23 years, 2 months, 22 days	
Mr. Mister	Go On...	8 September 1987	Pull (Note: Originally recorded in 1989–1990)	23 November 2010	23 years, 2 months, 15 days	
Belly	King	13 February 1995	Dove	4 May 2018	23 years, 2 months, 11 days	
The Obsessed	The Church Within	1 March 1994	Sacred	7 April 2017	23 years, 1 month, 6 days	
Girl Trouble	The Illusion of Excitement	30 June 2003	As Is	10 July 2026	23 years, 10 days	
The Zombies	Odessey and Oracle	19 April 1968	New World	April 1991	23 years	
James Carr	A Man Needs a Woman	1968	Take Me to the Limit	1991	23 years	
Nancy Sinatra	Woman	1972	One More Time	11 April 1995	23 years	
Blind Idiot God	Cyclotron	1992	Before Ever After	24 February 2015	23 years	
Darkwoods My Betrothed	Witch-Hunts	1998	Angel of Carnage Unleashed	12 November 2021	23 years	
The Dictators	D.F.F.D.	2001	The Dictators	6 September 2024	23 years	
Lesley Gore	The Canvas Can Do Miracles	July 1982	Ever Since	28 June 2005	22 years, 11 months	
Seikima-II	Living Legend	21 October 1999	Bloodiest	21 September 2022	22 years, 11 months	
Keith Richards	Main Offender	19 October 1992	Crosseyed Heart	18 September 2015	22 years, 10 months, 30 days	
Trevor Rabin	Can't Look Away	31 July 1989	Jacaranda	8 May 2012	22 years, 9 months, 8 days	
Quicksand	Manic Compression	28 February 1995	Interiors	10 November 2017	22 years, 8 months, 13 days	
Kajagoogoo	Crazy Peoples Right to Speak (Note: as Kaja)	30 September 1985	Gone to the Moon	27 May 2008	22 years, 7 months, 27 days	
Semisonic	All About Chemistry	13 March 2001	Little Bit of Sun	3 November 2023	22 years, 7 months, 22 days	
Pixies	Trompe le Monde	23 September 1991	Indie Cindy	19 April 2014	22 years, 6 months, 27 days	
Vendetta	Brain Damage	24 October 1988	Hate	23 April 2007	22 years, 5 months, 30 days	
That Dog	Retreat from the Sun	8 April 1997	Old LP	4 October 2019	22 years, 5 months, 26 days	
Bronski Beat	Rainbow Nation	13 February 1995	The Age of Reason	28 July 2017	22 years, 5 months, 15 days	
Hum	Downward Is Heavenward	27 January 1998	Inlet	23 June 2020	22 years, 4 months, 27 days	
Dropdead	Dropdead	1 June 1998	Dropdead 2020	25 September 2020	22 years, 3 months, 24 days	
The Calling	Two	8 June 2004	Before the World Turns to Dust	25 September 2026	22 years, 3 months, 17 days	
Jeff Lynne	Armchair Theatre	12 June 1990	Long Wave	26 September 2012 (Note: Japan release; UK, Europe & US release in October 2012)	22 years, 3 months, 14 days	
Slowdive	Pygmalion	6 February 1995	Slowdive	5 May 2017	22 years, 2 months, 29 days	
The Soft Boys	Underwater Moonlight	28 June 1980	Nextdoorland	24 September 2002	22 years, 2 months, 28 days	
Bel Canto	Dorothy's Victory	27 February 2002	Radiant Green	26 April 2024	22 years, 2 months	
The Motels	Shock	August 1985	Clean Modern and Reasonable	September 2007	22 years, 1 month	
David Gilmour	About Face	5 March 1984	On an Island	6 March 2006	22 years, 1 day	
Bobby Bare	Drinkin' from the Bottle	1983	The Moon Was Blue	2005	22 years	
Gluecifer	Automatic Thrill	26 January 2004	Same Drug New High	16 January 2026	21 years, 11 months, 21 days	
Martha Reeves	Home to You	24 August 2004	Searching	14 August 2026	21 years, 11 months, 21 days	
Marvin Gaye	Vulnerable (Note: Originally recorded in 1977)	22 April 1997	You're the Man (Note: Originally recorded in 1972)	19 March 2019	21 years, 11 months, 7 days	
Liquid Tension Experiment	Liquid Tension Experiment 2	15 June 1999	Liquid Tension Experiment 3	16 April 2021	21 years, 10 months, 1 day	
Conflict	There's No Power Without Control	July 2003	This Much Remains	25 April 2025	21 years, 9 months	
Mission of Burma	Vs.	11 October 1982	ONoffON	4 May 2004	21 years, 6 months, 23 days	
Bernie Leadon	Mirror	23 March 2004	Too Late to Be Cool	10 October 2025	21 years, 6 months, 17 days	
Trespass	Head	21 September 1993	Trespass	5 April 2015	21 years, 6 months, 15 days	
Sleeper	Pleased to Meet You	13 October 1997	The Modern Age	22 March 2019	21 years, 5 months, 9 days	
Mr. Bungle	California	13 June 1999	The Raging Wrath of the Easter Bunny Demo	30 October 2020	21 years, 3 months, 17 days	
Tony Iommi	Fused	11 July 2005	From the Dark	23 October 2026	21 years, 3 months, 12 days	
Ride	Tarantula	11 March 1996	Weather Diaries	16 June 2017	21 years, 3 months, 5 days	
The Vaselines	Dum-Dum	June 1989	Sex with an X	14 September 2010	21 years, 3 months	
My Bloody Valentine	Loveless	4 November 1991	m b v	2 February 2013	21 years, 2 months, 29 days	
38 Special	Drivetrain	24 July 2004	Milestone	19 September 2025	21 years, 1 month, 26 days	
Patrick Rondat	An Ephemeral World	26 April 2004	Escape from Shadows	30 May 2025	21 years, 1 month, 4 days	
Nektar	Man in the Moon	1980	The Prodigal Son	21 September 2001	21 years	
Cherubs	Heroin Man	1994	2 YNFYNYTY	3 March 2015	21 years	
The Ozark Mountain Daredevils	13	1997	Off the Beaten Path	17 August 2018	21 years	
Mclusky	The Difference Between Me and You Is That I'm Not on Fire	17 May 2004	The World Is Still Here and So Are We	9 May 2025	20 years, 11 months, 22 days	
A	Teen Dance Ordinance	25 June 2005	Prang	22 May 2025	20 years, 10 months, 27 days	
Stabbing Westward	Stabbing Westward	22 May 2001	Chasing Ghosts	18 March 2022	20 years, 9 months, 24 days	
David Crosby	Thousand Roads	4 May 1993	Croz	28 January 2014	20 years, 8 months, 25 days	
12 Rods	Lost Time	15 October 2002	If We Stayed Alive	7 July 2023	20 years, 8 months, 23 days	
Pink Floyd	The Division Bell	28 March 1994	The Endless River	10 November 2014	20 years, 7 months, 13 days	
China Crisis	Warped by Success	24 August 1994	Autumn in the Neighbourhood	3 June 2015	20 years, 7 months, 11 days	
Balance of Power	Heathen Machine	22 September 2003	Fresh from the Abyss	19 April 2024	20 years, 6 months, 28 days	
The Undertones	The Sin of Pride	13 March 1983	Get What You Need	30 September 2003	20 years, 6 months, 18 days	
Nasty Savage	Psycho Psycho	22 March 2004	Jeopardy Room	4 October 2024	20 years, 6 months, 12 days	
Hot Tuna	Pair a Dice Found	2 November 1990	Steady as She Goes	5 April 2011	20 years, 5 months, 4 days	
Cro-Mags	Revenge	18 January 2000	In the Beginning	19 June 2020	20 years, 5 months, 1 day	
Public Image Ltd.	That What Is Not	10 February 1992	This Is PiL	28 May 2012	20 years, 3 months, 19 days	
Dead End	Zero	21 September 1989	Metamorphosis	11 November 2009	20 years, 1 month, 22 days	
The Feelies	Time for a Witness	5 March 1991	Here Before	12 April 2011	20 years, 1 month, 8 days	
Joe Walsh	Songs for a Dying Planet	May 1992	Analog Man	5 June 2012	20 years, 1 month	
The Crazy World of Arthur Brown	The Crazy World of Arthur Brown	June 1968	Strangelands	1988	20 years	
Crispy Ambulance	The Plateau Phase	1982	Scissorgun	2002	20 years	
Devo	Smooth Noodle Maps	June 1990	Something for Everybody	15 June 2010	20 years	

== 10–19 years ==
Artist	Previous album	Released	Subsequent album	Released	Time between releases	Ref(s)
Will Smith	Lost and Found	29 March 2005	Based on a True Story	28 March 2025	19 years, 11 months, 28 days	
Protector	The Heritage	20 September 1993	Reanimated Homunculus	13 September 2013	19 years, 11 months, 24 days	
Thornetta Davis	Sunday Morning Music	8 October 1996	Honest Woman	23 September 2016	19 years, 11 months, 15 days	
Ace Frehley	Trouble Walkin'	13 October 1989	Anomaly	15 September 2009	19 years, 11 months, 2 days	
Black Grape	Stupid Stupid Stupid	10 November 1997	Pop Voodoo	4 August 2017	19 years, 8 months, 25 days	
Jodeci	The Show, the After Party, the Hotel	18 July 1995	The Past, the Present, the Future	31 March 2015	19 years, 8 months, 13 days	
L7	Slap-Happy	24 August 1999	Scatter the Rats	3 May 2019	19 years, 8 months, 9 days	
Bonnie McKee	Trouble	28 September 2004	Hot City	31 May 2024	19 years, 8 months, 4 days	
Traffic	When the Eagle Flies	September 1974	Far from Home	9 May 1994	19 years, 8 months	
Club Nouveau	Everything Is Black	10 October 1995	Consciousness	9 June 2015	19 years, 7 months, 30 days	
The Monkees	Justus	15 October 1996	Good Times!	27 May 2016	19 years, 7 months, 12 days	
Warning	Watching from a Distance	1 December 2006	Rituals of Shame	19 June 2026	19 years, 6 months, 18 days	
The Format	Dog Problems	11 July 2006	Boycott Heaven	23 January 2026	19 years, 6 months, 12 days	
Lowrider	Ode to Io	19 September 2000	Refractions	21 February 2020	19 years, 5 months, 2 days	
Bewitched	Spiritual Warfare	30 November 2006	Diabolical Death Mass	24 April 2026	19 years, 4 months, 25 days	
Piebald	Accidental Gentlemen	23 January 2007	Tales for the Rages	12 June 2026	19 years, 4 months, 20 days	
Brodequin	Methods of Execution	3 November 2004	Harbinger of Woe	22 March 2024	19 years, 4 months, 19 days	
Jerry Cantrell	Degradation Trip	18 June 2002	Brighten	29 October 2021	19 years, 4 months, 11 days	
Blue Öyster Cult	Curse of the Hidden Mirror	5 June 2001	The Symbol Remains	9 October 2020	19 years, 4 months, 4 days	
Kix	Show Business	4 April 1995	Rock Your Face Off	5 August 2014	19 years, 4 months, 1 day	
Down	Over the Under	25 September 2007	Volume V	20 November 2026	19 years, 3 months, 26 days	
Duster	Contemporary Movement	22 August 2000	Duster	13 December 2019	19 years, 3 months, 21 days	
Steely Dan	Gaucho	21 November 1980	Two Against Nature	29 February 2000	19 years, 3 months, 9 days	
Failure	Fantastic Planet	13 August 1996	The Heart Is a Monster	30 June 2015	19 years, 2 months, 18 days	
Grace Jones	Bulletproof Heart	13 October 1989	Hurricane	3 November 2008	19 years, 21 days	
The Chills	Sunburnt	10 October 1996	Silver Bullets	30 October 2015	19 years, 21 days	
Kayak	Merlin	1981	Close to the Fire	May 2000	19 years	
Kitchens of Distinction	Cowboys and Aliens	3 October 1994	Folly	30 September 2013	18 years, 11 months, 14 days	
At the Gates	Slaughter of the Soul	14 November 1995	At War with Reality	28 October 2014	18 years, 11 months, 14 days	
Culture Club	Don't Mind If I Do	22 November 1999	Life (Note: Credited to Boy George and Culture Club)	26 October 2018	18 years, 11 months, 4 days	
Ugly Kid Joe	Motel California	22 October 1996	Uglier Than They Used ta Be	18 September 2015	18 years, 10 months, 27 days	
The Jesus and Mary Chain	Munki	2 June 1998	Damage and Joy	24 March 2017	18 years, 9 months, 22 days	
The Romantics	Rhythm Romance	1 January 1985	61/49	9 September 2003	18 years, 9 months, 9 days	
Bruce Dickinson	Tyranny of Souls	23 May 2005	The Mandrake Project	1 March 2024	18 years, 9 months, 7 days	
Voxtrot	Voxtrot	22 May 2007	Dreamers in Exile	27 February 2026	18 years, 9 months, 5 days	
Kill the Thrill	Tellurique	9 May 2005	Autophagie	26 January 2024	18 years, 8 months, 17 days	
Midnight Oil	Capricornia	19 February 2002	The Makarrata Project	30 October 2020	18 years, 8 months, 12 days	
Heathen	Victims of Deception	12 April 1991	The Evolution of Chaos	23 December 2009	18 years, 8 months, 11 days	
Astarte	Demonized	26 February 2007	Blackdemonium	7 November 2025	18 years, 8 months, 9 days	
Pretty Things	Cross Talk	August 1980	... Rage Before Beauty	9 March 1999	18 years, 7 months	
Clawfinger	Life Will Kill You	27 July 2007	Before We All Die	20 February 2026	18 years, 6 months, 24 days	
Atif Aslam	Meri Kahani	8 January 2008	Subah Aye Na	31 July 2026	18 years, 6 months, 24 days	
Morgoth	Feel Sorry for the Fanatic	25 September 1996	Ungod	26 March 2015	18 years, 6 months, 1 day	
Peter Criss	One for All	23 July 2007	Peter Criss	19 December 2025	18 years, 4 months, 26 days	
Jethro Tull	The Jethro Tull Christmas Album	30 September 2003	The Zealot Gene	28 January 2022	18 years, 3 months, 29 days	
Hanoi Rocks	Two Steps from the Move	7 August 1984	Twelve Shots on the Rocks	29 November 2002	18 years, 3 months, 22 days	
Deadman	In the Direction of Sunrise and Night Light	14 December 2005	Genealogie der Moral	30 March 2024	18 years, 3 months, 17 days	
Carly Simon	This Kind of Love	29 April 2008	Comes in Waves	14 August 2026	18 years, 3 months, 16 days	
The Blow Monkeys	Springtime for the World	25 June 1990	Devil's Tavern	8 September 2008	18 years, 2 months, 14 days	
The Starting Line	Direction	31 July 2007	Eternal Youth	26 September 2025	18 years, 1 month, 26 days	
Dubstar	Make It Better	28 August 2000	One	12 October 2018	18 years, 1 month, 14 days	
Jeromes Dream	Presents	9 June 2001	LP	19 July 2019	18 years, 1 month, 10 days	
A Tribe Called Quest	The Love Movement	29 September 1998	We Got It from Here... Thank You 4 Your Service	11 November 2016	18 years, 1 month, 3 days	
The American Analog Set	Set Free	30 September 2005	For Forever	27 October 2023	18 years, 28 days	
Paris Hilton	Paris	14 August 2006	Infinite Icon	6 September 2024	18 years, 23 days	
Richard Wright	Wet Dream	22 September 1978	Broken China (Note: as Rick Wright)	7 October 1996	18 years, 15 days	
Sechs Kies	Com'Back	9 September 1999	Another Light	21 September 2017	18 years, 12 days	
Black Sabbath	Forbidden	5 June 1995	13	7 June 2013	18 years, 2 days	
Wolfsbane	Wolfsbane	1994	Wolfsbane Save the World	9 January 2012	18 years	
Faith No More	Album of the Year	3 June 1997	Sol Invictus	19 May 2015	17 years, 11 months, 16 days	
Gnarls Barkley	The Odd Couple	18 March 2008	Atlanta	6 March 2026	17 years, 11 months, 16 days	
Perry Farrell	Song Yet to Be Sung	16 July 2001	Kind Heaven	7 June 2019	17 years, 10 months, 22 days	
The Rembrandts	Lost Together	2 October 2001	Via Satellite	23 August 2019	17 years, 10 months, 21 days	
Adam Ant	Wonderful	7 March 1995	Adam Ant Is the Blueblack Hussar in Marrying the Gunner's Daughter	21 January 2013	17 years, 10 months, 15 days	
Black Rain	Nanarchy	15 October 1996	Dark Pool	12 August 2014	17 years, 9 months, 28 days	
Daphne and Celeste	We Didn't Say That!	26 June 2000	Daphne & Celeste Save the World	30 March 2018	17 years, 9 months, 5 days	
Reef	Getaway	18 August 2000	Revelation	4 May 2018	17 years, 8 months, 16 days	
Little Steven	Born Again Savage	10 September 1999	Soulfire	19 May 2017	17 years, 8 months, 9 days	
The dB's	Paris Avenue	4 October 1994	Falling Off the Sky	12 June 2012	17 years, 8 months, 8 days	
In the Woods...	Strange in Stereo	1 February 1999	Pure	16 September 2016	17 years, 7 months, 16 days	
Lighthouse Family	Whatever Gets You Through the Day	19 November 2001	Blue Sky in Your Head	5 July 2019	17 years, 7 months, 16 days	
The Academy Is...	Fast Times at Barrington High	19 August 2008	Almost There	27 March 2026	17 years, 7 months, 8 days	
The Microphones	Mount Eerie	21 January 2003	Microphones in 2020	7 August 2020	17 years, 6 months, 19 days	
Ultravox	Ingenuity	10 November 1994	Brilliant	25 May 2012	17 years, 6 months, 15 days	
Alison Krauss	Forget About It	3 August 1999	Windy City	17 February 2017	17 years, 6 months, 14 days	
Neneh Cherry	Man	2 September 1996	Blank Project	25 February 2014	17 years, 5 months, 23 days	
Tears for Fears	Everybody Loves a Happy Ending	14 September 2004	The Tipping Point	25 February 2022	17 years, 5 months	
Witchfynde	Lords of Sin	1984	The Witching Hour	9 April 2001	17 years, 4 months, 9 days	
Elio Pace	A Seat at My Table	May 2009	I'll Take It from Here, Kid	10 September 2026	17 years, 4 months	
Spinal Tap	Break Like the Wind	17 March 1992	Back from the Dead	16 June 2009	17 years, 3 months, 27 days	
Carcass	Swansong	10 June 1996	Surgical Steel	13 September 2013	17 years, 3 months, 3 days	
Whiplash	Unborn Again	8 September 2009	Roar	27 November 2026	17 years, 2 months, 20 days	
The Old Dead Tree	The Water Fields	17 September 2007	Second Thoughts	6 December 2024	17 years, 2 months, 19 days	
Atheist	Elements	30 August 1993	Jupiter	8 November 2010	17 years, 2 months, 9 days	
The Network	Money Money 2020	30 September 2003	Money Money 2020 Part II: We Told Ya So!	4 December 2020	17 years, 2 months, 4 days	
Zebra	3.V	May 1986	Zebra IV	8 July 2003	17 years, 2 months	
Ghinzu	Mirror Mirror	30 March 2009	W.O.W.A.	29 May 2026	17 years, 1 month, 29 days	
The Go-Go's	Talk Show	19 March 1984	God Bless the Go-Go's	15 May 2001	17 years, 1 month, 26 days	
Earshot	The Silver Lining	26 August 2008	Humaning	10 October 2025	17 years, 1 month, 14 days	
Philip Bailey	Soul on Jazz	23 April 2002	Love Will Find a Way	21 June 2019	17 years, 1 month, 13 days	
Jefferson Airplane	Long John Silver	20 July 1972	Jefferson Airplane	22 August 1989	17 years, 1 month, 2 days	
American Football	American Football	28 September 1999	American Football	21 October 2016	17 years, 23 days	
Manu Chao	La Radiolina	4 September 2007	Viva Tu	20 September 2024	17 years, 16 days	
D'erlanger	Basilisk	7 March 1990	Lazzaro	14 March 2007	17 years, 8 days	
Steve Miller Band	Wide River	8 June 1993	Bingo!	15 June 2010	17 years, 7 days	
Swervedriver	99th Dream	24 February 1998	I Wasn't Born to Lose You	3 March 2015	17 years, 7 days	
Booker T. & the M.G.'s	Universal Language	1977	That's the Way It Should Be	24 May 1994	17 years	
Linda Thompson	One Clear Moment	1985	Fashionably Late	30 July 2002	17 years	
Doris Day	The Love Album	1994	My Heart	5 September 2011	17 years	
Nodens Ictus	Spacelines	2000	The Cozmic Key	10 December 2017	17 years	
Self	Gizmodgery	5 September 2000	Ornament & Crime	25 August 2017	16 years, 11 months, 21 days	
Saint Vitus	Die Healing	9 May 1995	Lillie: F-65	27 April 2012	16 years, 11 months, 18 days	
White Lion	Mane Attraction	2 April 1991	Return of the Pride	14 March 2008	16 years, 11 months, 12 days	
Diddy	Press Play (Note: as P. Diddy)	17 October 2006	The Love Album: Off the Grid	15 September 2023	16 years, 10 months, 30 days	
Mazzy Star	Among My Swan	29 October 1996	Seasons of Your Day	23 September 2013	16 years, 10 months, 25 days	
Cloven Hoof	A Sultan's Ransom	1 August 1989	Eye of the Sun	23 June 2006	16 years, 10 months, 22 days	
The Lox	We Are the Streets	25 January 2000	Filthy America... It's Beautiful	16 December 2016	16 years, 10 months, 22 days	
X-Ray Spex	Germfree Adolescents	10 November 1978	Conscious Consumer	28 September 1995	16 years, 10 months, 18 days	
Agnetha Fältskog	I Stand Alone	9 November 1987	My Colouring Book	19 April 2004	16 years, 9 months, 15 days	
Blondie	The Hunter	May 1982	No Exit	23 February 1999	16 years, 9 months	
Sleepytime Gorilla Museum	In Glorious Times	29 May 2007	Of the Last Human Being	23 February 2024	16 years, 8 months, 25 days	
Kraftwerk	Electric Café	10 November 1986	Tour de France Soundtracks	4 August 2003	16 years, 8 months, 24 days	
Poison the Well	The Tropic Rot	7 July 2009	Peace in Place	20 March 2026	16 years, 8 months, 13 days	
Refused	The Shape of Punk to Come	27 October 1998	Freedom	29 June 2015	16 years, 8 months, 2 days	
At the Drive-In	Relationship of Command	12 September 2000	In•ter a•li•a	5 May 2017	16 years, 7 months, 23 days	
The Band	Islands	15 March 1977	Jericho	2 November 1993	16 years, 7 months, 19 days	
Cadaver	Necrosis	20 April 2004	Edder & Bile	27 November 2020	16 years, 7 months, 7 days	
Mütiilation	Sorrow Galaxies	1 September 2007	Black Metal Cult	29 March 2024	16 years, 6 months, 29 days	
Thelonius Monster	California Clam Chowder	20 April 2004	Oh That Monster	3 November 2020	16 years, 6 months, 14 days	
The Durutti Column	A Paean to Wilson	25 January 2010	Renascent	31 July 2026	16 years, 6 months, 7 days	
Shed Seven	Truth Be Told	7 May 2001	Instant Pleasures	10 November 2017	16 years, 6 months, 3 days	
Molly Hatchet	Justice	1 June 2010	Lost Horizon	27 November 2026	16 years, 5 months, 26 days	
Gustavo Santaolalla	Ronroco	13 January 1998	Camino	8 July 2014	16 years, 5 months, 25 days	
Soundgarden	Down on the Upside	21 May 1996	King Animal	13 November 2012	16 years, 5 months, 23 days	
Focus	Focus (Note: Released under the moniker Focus by Jan Akkerman & Thijs van Leer)	August 1985	Focus 8	January 2002	16 years, 5 months	
Erykah Badu	New Amerykah Part Two (Return of the Ankh)	30 March 2010	Before the World Blows (Note: Collaborative album with the Alchemist)	28 August 2026	16 years, 4 months, 29 days	
Royal Trux	Hand of Glory	8 October 2002	White Stuff	1 March 2019	16 years, 4 months, 21 days	
Gang Starr	The Ownerz	24 June 2003	One of the Best Yet	1 November 2019	16 years, 4 months, 7 days	
Brujeria	Brujerizmo	17 May 2000	Pocho Aztlan	16 September 2016	16 years, 3 months, 30 days	
Graham Nash	Innocent Eyes	27 March 1986	Songs for Survivors	30 July 2002	16 years, 3 months, 3 days	
Dead Can Dance	Spiritchaser	3 June 1996	Anastasis	13 August 2012	16 years, 2 months, 10 days	
Dr. Feelgood	Repeat Prescription	6 September 2006	Damn Right!	4 November 2022	16 years, 1 month, 29 days	
Celtic Frost	Vanity/Nemesis	11 April 1990	Monotheist	29 May 2006	16 years, 1 month, 18 days	
Steve Morse Band	Out Standing in Their Field	29 September 2009	Triangulation	14 November 2025	16 years, 1 month, 16 days	
Violent Femmes	Freak Magnet	22 February 2000	We Can Do Anything	4 March 2016	16 years, 12 days	
The Cure	4:13 Dream	27 October 2008	Songs of a Lost World	1 November 2024	16 years, 6 days	
Forbidden	Omega Wave	22 October 2010	Forbidden	23 October 2026	16 years, 1 day	
Wigwam	Dark Album	1977	Light Ages	1993	16 years	
Jaguar	This Time	1984	Wake Me	2000	16 years	
Eddie and the Hot Rods	Been There Done That,	2006	Guardians of the Legacy	October 2022	16 years	
Air Supply	Mumbo Jumbo	4 May 2010	A Matter of Time	29 April 2026	15 years, 11 months, 25 days	
Skid Row	Revolutions per Minute	24 October 2006	The Gang's All Here	14 October 2022	15 years, 11 months, 20 days	
Vida Blue	The Illustrated Band	14 October 2003	Crossing Lines	20 September 2019	15 years, 11 months, 7 days	
Pestilence	Spheres	3 May 1993	Resurrection Macabre	16 March 2009	15 years, 10 months, 13 days	
Gil Scott-Heron	Spirits	29 March 1994	I'm New Here	8 February 2010	15 years, 10 months, 11 days	
Gordon Lightfoot	Harmony	11 May 2004	Solo	20 March 2020	15 years, 10 months, 9 days	
The Whitlams	Little Cloud	20 March 2006	Sancho	28 January 2022	15 years, 10 months, 8 days	
The Beach Boys	Stars and Stripes Vol. 1	19 August 1996	That's Why God Made the Radio	5 June 2012	15 years, 9 months, 17 days	
Stray	Valhalla	1 January 2008	About Time	15 September 2023	15 year, 9 months, 15 days	
The B-52's	Good Stuff	23 June 1992	Funplex	25 March 2008	15 years, 9 months, 3 days	
Dr. Dre	2001	16 November 1999	Compton	7 August 2015	15 years, 8 months, 22 days	
Leftfield	Rhythm and Stealth	20 September 1999	Alternative Light Source	8 June 2015	15 years, 8 months, 19 days	
Diplo	Florida	21 September 2004	Chapter 1: Snake Oil (Note: as Thomas Wesley)	29 May 2020	15 years, 8 months, 8 days	
The Avalanches	Since I Left You	27 November 2000	Wildflower	1 July 2016	15 years, 7 months, 4 days	
Masters of Reality	Pine Cross Dover	24 August 2009	The Archer	28 March 2025	15 years, 7 months, 4 days	
Clipse	Til the Casket Drops	8 December 2009	Let God Sort Em Out	11 July 2025	15 years, 7 months, 3 days	
Headless	Inside You	1 January 1998	Growing Apart	7 June 2013	15 years, 6 months, 7 days	
Lisa Lisa	LL77	18 January 1994	Life 'n Love	14 July 2009	15 years, 5 months, 29 days	
Fun Lovin' Criminals	Classic Fantastic	1 March 2010	A Matter of Time	29 August 2025	15 years, 5 months, 28 days	
John Petrucci	Suspended Animation	1 March 2005	Terminal Velocity	28 August 2020	15 years, 5 months, 27 days	
The Afghan Whigs	1965	27 October 1998	Do to the Beast	15 April 2014	15 years, 5 months, 19 days	
Aaron Carter	Another Earthquake!	3 September 2002	Love	16 February 2018	15 years, 5 months, 13 days	
Be Your Own Pet	Get Awkward	18 March 2008	Mommy	25 August 2023	15 years, 5 months, 8 days	
Arab Strap	The Last Romance	17 October 2005	As Days Get Dark	5 March 2021	15 years, 4 months, 16 days	
The Rentals	Seven More Minutes	13 April 1999	Lost in Alphaville	22 August 2014	15 years, 4 months, 9 days	
St Germain	Tourist	30 May 2000	St Germain	9 October 2015	15 years, 4 months, 9 days	
Nasty Savage	Penetration Point	1 January 1989	Psycho Psycho	22 March 2004	15 years, 3 months, 22 days	
Social Distortion	Hard Times and Nursery Rhymes	18 January 2011	Born to Kill	8 May 2026	15 years, 3 months, 20 days	
Electric Light Orchestra	Balance of Power	3 March 1986	Zoom	12 June 2001	15 years, 3 months, 9 days	
Pendulum	Immersion	21 May 2010	Inertia	22 August 2025	15 years, 3 months, 1 day	
Vanessa Williams	The Real Thing	27 May 2009	Survivor	23 August 2024	15 years, 2 months, 27 days	
Cynic	Focus	13 September 1993	Traced in Air	25 November 2008	15 years, 2 months, 12 days	
Diana Ross	I Love You	2 October 2006	Thank You	5 November 2021	15 years, 1 month, 3 days	
George Harrison	Cloud Nine	2 November 1987	Brainwashed	19 November 2002	15 years, 17 days	
Guns N' Roses	"The Spaghetti Incident?"	23 November 1993	Chinese Democracy	23 November 2008	15 years	
Neil & Iraiza	New School	20 December 2002	Timeless Melodies	20 December 2017	15 years	
Sleep	Dopesmoker	22 April 2003	The Sciences	20 April 2018	14 years, 11 months, 28 days	
Stryper	Against the Law	21 August 1990	Reborn	16 August 2005	14 years, 11 months, 26 days	
Foreigner	Mr. Moonlight	24 October 1994	Can't Slow Down	29 September 2009	14 years, 11 months, 5 days	
Vangelis	Mythodea	23 October 2001	Rosetta	23 September 2016	14 years, 11 months	
The Bangles	Everything	18 October 1988	Doll Revolution	9 September 2003	14 years, 10 months, 22 days	
D'Angelo	Voodoo	25 January 2000	Black Messiah (Note: Credited to D'Angelo and the Vanguard)	15 December 2014	14 years, 10 months, 20 days	
Shania Twain	Up!	19 November 2002	Now	29 September 2017	14 years, 10 months, 10 days	
Ali Zafar	Jhoom	14 February 2011	Roshni	20 December 2025	14 years, 10 months, 7 days	
Hard-Fi	Killer Sounds	19 August 2011	Sweating Someone Else's Fever	19 June 2026	14 years, 10 months	
Extreme	Saudades de Rock	12 August 2008	Six	9 June 2023	14 years, 9 months, 28 days	
John Parr	Under Parr	13 September 1996	Letter to America	4 July 2011	14 years, 9 months, 21 days	
Tribalistas	Tribalistas	4 November 2002	Tribalistas	25 August 2017	14 years, 9 months, 21 days	
Zero 7	Yeah Ghost	28 September 2009	In the Half Light (Note: Collaborative album with Swim Surreal)	21 June 2024	14 years, 8 months, 24 days	
Ben Folds	Way to Normal	17 September 2008	What Matters Most	2 June 2023	14 years, 8 months, 16 days	
Jesse Sykes	Marble Son	29 March 2011	Forever, I’ve Been Being Born	28 November 2025	14 years, 7 months, 30 days	
Demons & Wizards	Touched by the Crimson King	27 June 2005	III	21 February 2020	14 years, 7 months, 25 days	
Lita Ford	Black	14 February 1995	Wicked Wonderland	2 October 2009	14 years, 7 months, 18 days	
TLC	3D	10 October 2002	TLC	30 June 2017	14 years, 7 months, 18 days	
New Kids on the Block	Face the Music	25 January 1994	The Block	2 September 2008	14 years, 7 months, 8 days	
Accept	Predator	15 January 1996	Blood of the Nations	20 August 2010	14 years, 7 months, 5 days	
Kerri Chandler	Computer Games	27 February 2008	Spaces and Places	26 September 2022	14 years, 6 months, 30 days	
Richie Sambora	Undiscovered Soul	23 February 1998	Aftermath of the Lowdown	12 September 2012	14 years, 6 months, 20 days	
The Black Crowes	Before the Frost...Until the Freeze	31 August 2009	Happiness Bastards	15 March 2024	14 years, 6 months, 15 days	
Stereolab	Not Music	16 November 2010	Instant Holograms on Metal Film	23 May 2025	14 years, 6 months, 8 days	
Procol Harum	Something Magic	25 February 1977	The Prodigal Stranger	27 August 1991	14 years, 6 months, 2 days	
Television	Adventure	1 April 1978	Television	28 September 1992	14 years, 5 months, 27 days	
Electric Light Orchestra	Zoom	12 June 2001	Alone in the Universe (Note: Credited to Jeff Lynne's ELO)	13 November 2015	14 years, 5 months, 1 day	
American Nightmare	We're Down Til We're Underground	23 September 2003	American Nightmare	16 February 2018	14 years, 4 months, 24 days	
Fat Joe	The Darkside Vol. 1	27 July 2010	The World Changed On Me	13 December 2024	14 years, 4 months, 16 days	
Ole Børud	Alle Skal Få Vite Det	1 January 1988	Chi-Rho	15 May 2002	14 years, 4 months, 15 days	
Sweet Savage	Regeneration	9 May 2011	Bang	12 September 2025	14 years, 4 months, 3 days	
Keri Hilson	No Boys Allowed	17 December 2010	We Need to Talk: Love	18 April 2025	14 years, 4 months, 1 day	
Tygers of Pan Tang	Burning in the Shade	1 May 1987	Mystical	24 August 2001	14 years, 3 months, 23 days	
Algernon Cadwallader	Parrot Flies	21 May 2011	Trying Not to Have a Thought	12 September 2025	14 years, 3 months, 22 days	
King's X	XV	20 May 2008	Three Sides of One	2 September 2022	14 years, 3 months, 13 days	
Green Carnation	Acoustic Verses	30 January 2006	Leaves of Yesteryear	8 May 2020	14 years, 3 months, 8 days	
Hootie & the Blowfish	Looking for Lucky	9 August 2005	Imperfect Circle	1 November 2019	14 years, 2 months, 24 days	
Graham Coxon	A+E	2 April 2012	Castle Park	19 June 2026	14 years, 2 months, 17 days	
Graham Central Station	GCS 2000	21 July 1998	Raise Up	25 September 2012	14 years, 2 months, 4 days	
Ram-Zet	Freaks in Wonderland	24 January 2012	Sapien	27 March 2026	14 years, 2 months, 3 days	
The Chicks	Taking the Long Way (Note: as Dixie Chicks)	23 May 2006	Gaslighter	17 July 2020	14 years, 1 month, 24 days	
The All-American Rejects	Kids in the Street	26 March 2012	Sandbox	15 May 2026	14 years, 1 month, 19 days	
Procol Harum	The Well's on Fire	4 March 2003	Novum	21 April 2017	14 years, 1 month, 17 days	
Madness	Mad Not Mad	30 September 1985	Wonderful	1 November 1999	14 years, 1 month, 2 days	
Death Angel	Act III	10 April 1990	The Art of Dying	4 May 2004	14 years, 24 days	
Orchestral Manoeuvres in the Dark	Universal	2 September 1996	History of Modern	20 September 2010	14 years, 19 days	
Confessor	Condemned	1 October 1991	Unraveled	17 October 2005	14 years, 16 days	
Lil' Kim	The Naked Truth	27 September 2005	9	11 October 2019	14 years, 14 days	
David Lee Murphy	Tryin' to Get There	23 March 2004	No Zip Code	6 April 2018	14 years, 13 days	
The Ocean Blue	Davy Jones' Locker	1999	Ultramarine	19 March 2013	14 years	
Dave Clarke	Devil's Advocate	3 November 2003	The Desecration of Desire	27 October 2017	13 years, 11 months, 24 days	
Wet Wet Wet	Timeless	12 November 2007	The Journey	5 November 2021	13 years, 11 months, 24 days	
Ivy	All Hours	20 September 2011	Traces of You	5 September 2025	13 years, 11 months, 16 days	
The Hellacopters	Head Off	18 April 2008	Eyes of Oblivion	1 April 2022	13 years, 11 months, 14 days	
Swans	Soundtracks for the Blind	29 October 1996	My Father Will Guide Me up a Rope to the Sky	23 September 2010	13 years, 10 months, 25 days	
Alice in Chains	Alice in Chains	7 November 1995	Black Gives Way to Blue	29 September 2009	13 years, 10 months, 22 days	
Van Halen	Van Halen III	17 March 1998	A Different Kind of Truth	7 February 2012	13 years, 10 months, 21 days	
Troll	Neo-Satanic Supremacy	27 January 2010	Trolldom	8 December 2023	13 years, 10 months, 12 days	
Aly & AJ	Insomniatic	10 July 2007	A Touch of the Beat Gets You Up on Your Feet Gets You Out and Then Into the Sun	7 May 2021	13 years, 9 months, 27 days	
Michelle Branch	Hotel Paper	24 June 2003	Hopeless Romantic	7 April 2017	13 years, 9 months, 14 days	
Biohazard	Reborn in Defiance	20 January 2012	Divided We Fall	17 October 2025	13 years, 8 months, 28 days	
Buzzcocks	A Different Kind of Tension	21 September 1979	Trade Test Transmissions	14 June 1993	13 years, 8 months, 24 days	
Travis Tritt	The Storm	21 August 2007	Set in Stone	7 May 2021	13 years, 8 months, 16 days	
The Go	Fiesta	21 December 2012	Free Electricity	4 September 2026	13 years, 8 months, 14 days	
Eyehategod	Confederacy of Ruined Lives	19 September 2000	Eyehategod	26 May 2014	13 years, 8 months, 7 days	
Lynyrd Skynyrd	Street Survivors	17 October 1977	Lynyrd Skynyrd 1991	11 June 1991	13 years, 7 months, 25 days	
Donna Summer	Christmas Spirit	4 October 1994	Crayons	22 March 2008	13 years, 7 months, 16 days	
Forbidden	Green	25 March 1997	Omega Wave	22 October 2010	13 years, 6 months, 28 days	
Dååth	Dååth	26 October 2010	The Deceivers	3 May 2024	13 years, 6 months, 7 days	
Emerson, Lake & Palmer	Love Beach	17 November 1978	Black Moon	18 May 1992	13 years, 6 months, 1 day	
Cartel	Collider	26 March 2013	Learning How to Cope	18 September 2026	13 years, 5 months, 23 days	
A Perfect Circle	Emotive	2 November 2004	Eat the Elephant	20 April 2018	13 years, 5 months, 18 days	
Hot Snakes	Audit in Progress	5 October 2004	Jericho Sirens	16 March 2018	13 years, 5 months, 13 days	
Luna Sea	Lunacy	12 July 2000	A Will	11 December 2013	13 years, 5 months	
Extol	Extol	21 June 2013	Aura of Decay	6 November 2026	13 years, 4 months, 16 days	
Julian Lennon	Photograph Smile	18 May 1998	Everything Changes	2 October 2011	13 years, 4 months, 14 days	
Cancer	Spirit in Flames	20 June 2005	Shadow Gripped	2 November 2018	13 years, 4 months, 12 days	
Ben Folds Five	The Unauthorized Biography of Reinhold Messner	27 April 1999	The Sound of the Life of the Mind	18 November 2012	13 years, 4 months, 11 days	
Sweet Savage	Rune	1 January 1998	Regeneration	9 May 2011	13 years, 4 months, 8 days	
Tool	10,000 Days	28 April 2006	Fear Inoculum	30 August 2019	13 years, 4 months, 3 days	
Superjoint	A Lethal Dose of American Hatred (Note: as Superjoint Ritual)	22 July 2003	Caught Up in the Gears of Application	11 November 2016	13 years, 3 months, 20 days	
Bill Fox	One Thought Revealed	17 January 2012	Resonance	15 April 2025	13 years, 2 months, 29 days	
Tokyo Blade	Pumphouse	1 January 1998	Thousand Men Strong	18 March 2011	13 years, 2 months, 17 days	
The Saints	King of the Sun	24 September 2012	Long March Through the Jazz Age	28 November 2025	13 years, 2 months, 4 days	
The Who	Endless Wire	30 October 2006	Who	6 December 2019	13 years, 1 month, 6 days	
Nami Tamaki	Ready	23 February 2011	Singularity	13 March 2024	13 years, 9 days	
Busted	A Present for Everyone	17 November 2003	Night Driver	25 November 2016	13 years, 8 days	
Alexisonfire	Old Crows / Young Cardinals	23 June 2009	Otherness	24 June 2022	13 years, 1 day	
Europe	Prisoners in Paradise	23 September 1991	Start from the Dark	22 September 2004	12 years, 11 months, 30 days	
Garth Brooks	Scarecrow	13 November 2001	Man Against Machine	11 November 2014	12 years, 11 months, 29 days	
Pretty Lights	A Color Map of the Sun	2 July 2013	A Trip Thru Time Fantastic (Note: A Trip Thru Time Fantastic is a 45-song studio album released in 9 parts. The first three parts were released on 1 July 2026.)	1 July 2026	12 years, 11 months, 29 days	
Boards of Canada	Tomorrow's Harvest	4 June 2013	Inferno	29 May 2026	12 years, 11 months, 25 days	
Godflesh	Hymns	23 October 2001	A World Lit Only by Fire	7 October 2014	12 years, 11 months, 14 days	
Jane's Addiction	Ritual de lo Habitual	21 August 1990	Strays	22 July 2003	12 years, 11 months, 1 day	
Gabriella Cilmi	The Sting	8 November 2013	Pure Love	9 October 2026	12 years, 11 months, 1 day	
Aphex Twin	Drukqs	22 October 2001	Syro	22 September 2014	12 years, 11 months	
Disillusion	Gloria	20 October 2006	The Liberation	6 September 2019	12 years, 10 months, 17 days	
Kittie	I've Failed You	30 August 2011	Fire	21 June 2024	12 years, 9 months, 22 days	
Sugababes	Sweet 7	5 March 2010	The Lost Tapes	24 December 2022	12 years, 9 months, 19 days	
Donald Fagen	Kamakiriad	25 May 1993	Morph the Cat	7 March 2006	12 years, 9 months, 10 days	
Porcupine Tree	The Incident	14 September 2009	Closure/Continuation	24 June 2022	12 years, 9 months, 10 days	
Disco Biscuits	Otherwise Law Abiding Citizens	7 July 2011	Revolution in Motion	29 March 2024	12 years, 8 months, 10 days	
Blind Melon	Soup	15 August 1995	For My Friends	22 April 2008	12 years, 8 months, 7 days	
N-Dubz	Love.Live.Life	29 November 2010	Timeless	4 August 2023	12 years, 8 months, 6 days	
The Streets	Computers and Blues	7 February 2011	The Darker the Shadow the Brighter the Light	13 October 2023	12 years, 8 months, 6 days	
Boy Meets Girl	New Dream	1 June 1990 (Note: UK & Europe release; not officially released in the US until 2005)	The Wonderground	17 January 2003	12 years, 7 months, 16 days	
Asia	Gravitas	21 March 2014	Indigo	6 November 2026	12 years, 7 months, 16 days	
98 Degrees	Revelation	26 September 2000	2.0	7 May 2013	12 years, 7 months, 11 days	
Gary Moore	Bad for You Baby	22 September 2008	How Blue Can You Get	30 April 2021	12 years, 7 months, 8 days	
Xzibit	Napalm	9 October 2012	Kingmaker	16 May 2025	12 years, 7 months, 7 days	
Soulwax	Any Minute Now	23 August 2004	From Deewee	24 March 2017	12 years, 7 months, 1 day	
Karnivool	Asymmetry	19 July 2013	In Verses	6 February 2026	12 years, 6 months, 18 days	
Bass Communion	Cenotaph	10 November 2011	The Itself of Itself	24 May 2024	12 years, 6 months, 14 days	
Patrick Wolf	Sundark and Riverlight	15 October 2012	Crying the Neck	24 April 2025	12 years, 6 months, 10 days	
Nuclear Assault	Something Wicked	23 February 1993	Third World Genocide	29 August 2005	12 years, 6 months, 6 days	
Level 42	Forever Now	14 March 1994	Retroglide	18 September 2006	12 years, 6 months, 4 days	
Gorguts	From Wisdom to Hate	6 March 2001	Colored Sands	6 August 2013	12 years, 5 months	
Emma Bunton	Life in Mono	4 December 2006	My Happy Place	12 April 2019	12 years, 4 months, 8 days	
Descendents	Cool to Be You	23 March 2004	Hypercaffium Spazzinate	29 July 2016	12 years, 4 months, 6 days	
Dirty Three	Toward the Low Sun	24 February 2012	Love Changes Everything	14 June 2024	12 years, 3 months, 21 days	
Echo & the Bunnymen	Meteorites	3 June 2014	Apples for Isaac	18 September 2026	12 years, 3 months, 15 days	
Ancient	Night Visit	1 June 2004	Back to the Land of the Dead	6 September 2016	12 years, 3 months, 5 days	
Misfits	Earth A.D./Wolfs Blood	December 1983	Static Age (Note: Originally recorded in 1978)	27 February 1996	12 years, 2 months	
Peter Gabriel	New Blood	9 October 2011	I/O	1 December 2023	12 years, 1 month, 22 days	
On Thorns I Lay	Egocentric	1 October 2003	Eternal Silence	6 November 2015	12 years, 1 month, 6 days	
Styx	Big Bang Theory	10 May 2005	The Mission	16 June 2017	12 years, 1 month, 6 days	
The Go-Betweens	16 Lovers Lane	August 1988	The Friends of Rachel Worth	16 September 2000	12 years, 1 month	
Beachwood Sparks	The Tarnished Gold	26 June 2012	Across the River of Stars	19 July 2024	12 years, 23 days	
Jamey Johnson	Living for a Song	6 October 2012	Midnight Gasoline	8 November 2024	12 years, 23 days	
The Fray	Helios	25 February 2014	A Light That Waits	13 March 2026	12 years, 17 days	
Zigzo	Add9 Suicide	27 September 2000	The Battle of Love	10 October 2012	12 years, 14 days	
Múm	Smilewound	6 September 2013	History of Silence	19 September 2025	12 years, 13 days	
John Lees' Barclay James Harvest	North	7 October 2013	Relativity	17 October 2025	12 years, 10 days	
Staind	Staind	13 September 2011	Confessions of the Fallen	22 September 2023	12 years, 9 days	
Kate Bush	The Red Shoes	2 November 1993	Aerial	7 November 2005	12 years, 5 days	
Dixie Dregs	Industry Standard (Note: as the Dregs)	1982	Full Circle	7 June 1994	12 years	
Rainbow	Bent Out of Shape	September 1983	Stranger in Us All	11 September 1995	12 years	
Modern Life Is War	Fever Hunting	9 September 2013	Life on the Moon	5 September 2025	11 years, 11 months, 27 days	
Blur	Think Tank	5 May 2003	The Magic Whip	27 April 2015	11 years, 11 months, 22 days	
The Dismemberment Plan	Change	23 October 2001	Uncanney Valley	14 October 2013	11 years, 11 months, 22 days	
Spin Doctors	If the River Was Whiskey	30 April 2013	Face Full of Cake	11 April 2025	11 years, 11 months, 12 days	
Trouble	Plastic Green Head	24 April 1995	Simple Mind Condition	3 April 2007	11 years, 11 months, 10 days	
Primus	Antipop	19 October 1999	Green Naugahyde	12 September 2011	11 years, 10 months, 24 days	
De La Soul	The Grind Date	5 October 2004	And the Anonymous Nobody...	26 August 2016	11 years, 10 months, 21 days	
Little Feat	Rooster Rag	26 June 2012	Sam's Place	17 May 2024	11 years, 10 months, 21 days	
Dispatch	Who Are We Living For?	10 October 2000	Circles Around the Sun	21 August 2012	11 years, 10 months, 11 days	
Gossip	A Joyful Noise	11 May 2012	Real Power	22 March 2024	11 years, 10 months, 11 days	
The Cinematic Orchestra	Ma Fleur	7 May 2007	To Believe	15 March 2019	11 years, 10 months, 8 days	
Loretta Lynn	Van Lear Rose	27 April 2004	Full Circle	4 March 2016	11 years, 10 months, 6 days	
A Certain Ratio	Mind Made Up	November 2008	ACR Loco	25 September 2020	11 years, 10 months	
Moving Mountains	Moving Mountains	10 September 2013	Pruning of the Lower Limbs	27 June 2025	11 years, 9 months, 17 days	
Boyzone	Where We Belong	25 May 1998	Brother	5 March 2010	11 years, 9 months, 8 days	
Squeeze	Domino	November 1998	Spot the Difference	3 August 2010	11 years, 9 months	
Tom Petty	Wildflowers	1 November 1994	Highway Companion	25 July 2006	11 years, 8 months, 24 days	
Billy Idol	Cyberpunk	28 June 1993	Devil's Playground	22 March 2005	11 years, 8 months, 22 days	
Boy Hits Car	All That Led Us Here	2 May 2014	Waves of Sound Across Oceans of Time	16 January 2026	11 years, 8 months, 14 days	
Howling Bells	Heartstrings	2 June 2014	Strange Life	13 February 2026	11 years, 8 months, 11 days	
Kings of Convenience	Declaration of Dependence	20 October 2009	Peace or Love	18 June 2021	11 years, 7 months, 29 days	
Diamond Head	Death and Progress	24 June 1993	All Will Be Revealed	14 February 2005	11 years, 7 months, 20 days	
Wire	The First Letter	October 1991	Send	May 2003	11 years, 7 months	
Cher	Living Proof	26 February 2002 (Note: US release)	Closer to the Truth	24 September 2013	11 years, 6 months, 29 days	
Samiam	Trips	6 September 2011	Stowaway	31 March 2023	11 years, 6 months, 25 days	
Take That	Nobody Else	8 May 1995	Beautiful World	24 November 2006	11 years, 6 months, 17 days	
No-Man	Schoolyard Ghosts	12 May 2008	Love You to Bits	22 November 2019	11 years, 6 months, 10 days	
Brecker Brothers	Straphangin'	March 1981	Return of the Brecker Brothers	September 1992	11 years, 6 months	
Osibisa	Osee Yee	27 October 2009	New Dawn	23 April 2021	11 years, 5 months, 27 days	
Skunk Anansie	Post Orgasmic Chill	22 March 1999	Wonderlustre	13 September 2010	11 years, 5 months, 22 days	
Exodus	Force of Habit	25 August 1992	Tempo of the Damned	2 February 2004	11 years, 5 months, 8 days	
Doves	Kingdom of Rust	6 April 2009	The Universal Want	11 September 2020	11 years, 5 months, 5 days	
22-Pistepirkko	Lime Green DeLorean	4 May 2011	Kind Hearts Have a Run Run	7 October 2022	11 years, 5 months, 3 days	
Trevor Rabin	Jacaranda	8 May 2012	Rio	6 October 2023	11 years, 4 months, 28 days	
Chaka Khan	Funk This	25 September 2007	Hello Happiness	15 February 2019	11 years, 4 months, 21 days	
Rainer Maria	Catastrophe Keeps Us Together	4 April 2006	S/T	18 August 2017	11 years, 4 months, 15 days	
Alabama Shakes	Sound & Color	17 April 2015	I Must Be Dreaming	28 August 2026	11 years, 4 months, 11 days	
Battlelore	Doombound	26 January 2011	The Return of the Shadow	3 June 2022	11 years, 4 months, 8 days	
LL Cool J	Authentic	30 April 2013	The FORCE	6 September 2024	11 years, 4 months, 7 days	
William D. Drake	Revere Reach	15 June 2015	Moulded by Industry	9 October 2026	11 years, 3 months, 24 days	
The Rolling Stones	A Bigger Bang	6 September 2005	Blue & Lonesome	2 December 2016	11 years, 2 months, 27 days	
The Raconteurs	Consolers of the Lonely	25 March 2008	Help Us Stranger	21 June 2019	11 years, 2 months, 27 days	
Star One	Victims of the Modern Age	25 October 2010	Revel in Time	18 February 2022	11 years, 2 months, 24 days	
The Hives	Lex Hives	1 June 2012	The Death of Randy Fitzsimmons	11 August 2023	11 years, 2 months, 10 days	
Before the Dawn	Rise of the Phoenix	27 April 2012	Stormbringers	30 June 2023	11 years, 2 months, 3 days	
Jelena Karleuša	Diva	11 June 2012	Alpha	13 August 2023	11 years, 2 months, 2 days	
Exist Trace	World Maker	24 September 2014	Who I Am	19 November 2025	11 years, 1 month, 26 days	
k-os	Can't Fly Without Gravity	4 September 2015	BLackneck	30 October 2026	11 years, 1 month, 26 days	
Jaguar	Run Ragged	14 July 2003	Metal X	29 August 2014	11 years, 1 month, 15 days	
Journey	Eclipse	24 May 2011	Freedom	8 July 2022	11 years, 1 month, 14 days	
ABC	Skyscraping	24 March 1997	Traffic	28 April 2008	11 years, 1 month, 4 days	
Myriam Hernández	Seducción	26 April 2011	Sinergia	27 May 2022	11 years, 1 month, 1 day	
Mountain	Go for Your Life	March 1985	Man's World	2 April 1996	11 years, 1 month	
Boston	Corporate America	25 November 2002	Life, Love & Hope	3 December 2013	11 years, 28 days	
Nina Hagen	Volksbeat	11 November 2011	Unity	9 December 2022	11 years, 28 days	
Autour de Lucie	Ta Lumière Particulière	27 April 2015	Hors Monde	22 May 2026	11 years, 25 days	
Whitesnake	Restless Heart	26 March 1997	Good to Be Bad	18 April 2008	11 years, 23 days	
Kiss	Psycho Circus	22 September 1998	Sonic Boom	6 October 2009	11 years, 14 days	
The Libertines	The Libertines	30 August 2004	Anthems for Doomed Youth	11 September 2015	11 years, 12 days	
King Crimson	Three of a Perfect Pair	23 March 1984	Thrak	3 April 1995	11 years, 11 days	
Fergie	The Dutchess	19 September 2006	Double Dutchess	22 September 2017	11 years, 3 days	
Kevin Rowland	The Wanderer	1988	My Beauty	1999	11 years	
Annie	Don't Stop	19 October 2009	Dark Hearts	16 October 2020	10 years, 11 months, 27 days	
Cryptopsy	Cryptopsy	14 September 2012	As Gomorrah Burns	8 September 2023	10 years, 11 months, 25 days	
Sahara Hotnights	Sahara Hotnights	25 May 2011	Love in Times of Low Expectations	6 May 2022	10 years, 11 months, 11 days	
Julian Lennon	Everything Changes	2 October 2011	Jude	9 September 2022	10 years, 11 months, 7 days	
Whiplash	Thrashback	5 October 1998	Unborn Again	8 September 2009	10 years, 11 months, 3 days	
Liz Phair	Funstyle	3 July 2010	Soberish	4 June 2021	10 years, 11 months, 3 days	
Camera Obscura	Desire Lines	3 June 2013	Look to the East, Look to the West	3 May 2024	10 years, 11 months	
The Verve	Urban Hymns	29 September 1997	Forth	25 August 2008	10 years, 10 months, 27 days	
Burzum	Hliðskjálf	12 April 1999	Belus	8 March 2010	10 years, 10 months, 24 days	
Eighteen Visions	Eighteen Visions	18 July 2006	XVIII	2 June 2017	10 years, 10 months, 15 days	
Nick Lowe	Quality Street: A Seasonal Selection for All the Family	29 October 2013	Indoor Safari	13 September 2024	10 years, 10 months, 15 days	
Kim Wilde	Now & Forever	30 October 1995	Never Say Never	8 September 2006	10 years, 10 months, 9 days	
Dethklok	Dethalbum III	16 October 2012	Dethalbum IV	22 August 2023	10 years, 10 months, 6 days	
Debbie Gibson	Ms. Vocalist (Note: Released exclusively in Japan)	3 November 2010	The Body Remembers	20 August 2021	10 years, 9 months, 17 days	
No Doubt	Rock Steady	11 December 2001	Push and Shove	21 September 2012	10 years, 9 months, 10 days	
Mandy Moore	Amanda Leigh	26 May 2009	Silver Landings	6 March 2020	10 years, 9 months, 9 days	
Matchbox Twenty	North	28 August 2012	Where the Light Goes	26 May 2023	10 years, 8 months, 28 days	
Heathen	The Evolution of Chaos	23 December 2009	Empire of the Blind	18 September 2020	10 years, 8 months, 26 days	
Shape of Despair	Illusion's Play	27 September 2004	Monotony Fields	15 June 2015	10 years, 8 months, 19 days	
Eve	Eve-Olution	27 August 2002	Lip Lock	14 May 2013	10 years, 8 months, 17 days	
Bush Tetras	Happy	13 November 2012	They Live in My Head	28 June 2023	10 years, 8 months, 15 days	
Stars in Battledress	Secrets and Signals	6 October 2003	In Droplet Form	16 June 2014	10 years, 8 months, 10 days	
The 180 Gs	180 D'Gs to the Future!	23 October 2007	Singin' to God	3 July 2018	10 years, 8 months, 10 days	
Hilary Duff	Breathe In. Breathe Out.	12 June 2015	Luck... or Something	20 February 2026	10 years, 8 months, 8 days	
Counting Crows	Somewhere Under Wonderland	2 September 2014	Butter Miracle, The Complete Sweets!	9 May 2025	10 years, 8 months, 7 days	
Pagan Altar	Mythical & Magical	18 December 2006	The Room of Shadows	24 August 2017	10 years, 8 months, 6 days	
Belinda Carlisle	Voila	5 February 2007	Wilder Shores	29 September 2017	10 years, 7 months, 24 days	
John Fogerty	Eye of the Zombie	29 September 1986	Blue Moon Swamp	20 May 1997	10 years, 7 months, 21 days	
Portishead	Portishead	29 September 1997	Third	28 April 2008	10 years, 6 months, 30 days	
Mekong Delta	Pictures at an Exhibition	27 January 1997	Lurking Fear	24 August 2007	10 years, 6 months, 28 days	
Stevie Wonder	Conversation Peace	21 March 1995	A Time to Love	18 October 2005	10 years, 6 months, 27 days	
Easy Star All-Stars	Easy Star's Thrillah	28 August 2012	Ziggy Stardub	21 April 2023	10 years, 6 months, 24 days	
Anthrax	For All Kings	26 February 2016	Cursum Perficio	18 September 2026	10 years, 6 months, 23 days	
Jill Scott	Woman	24 July 2015	To Whom This May Concern	13 February 2026	10 years, 6 months, 20 days	
OK Go	Hungry Ghosts	14 October 2014	And the Adjacent Possible	11 April 2025	10 years, 5 months, 28 days	
Gin Blossoms	Congratulations I'm Sorry	13 February 1996	Major Lodge Victory	8 August 2006	10 years, 5 months, 27 days	
The Mars Volta	Noctourniquet	26 March 2012	The Mars Volta	16 September 2022	10 years, 5 months, 21 days	
Suede	A New Morning	30 September 2002	Bloodsports	18 March 2013	10 years, 5 months, 18 days	
Dissection	Storm of the Light's Bane	17 November 1995	Reinkaos	30 April 2006	10 years, 5 months, 13 days	
Amber Pacific	The Turn	2 September 2014	All In	14 February 2025	10 years, 5 months, 12 days	
Faithless	The Dance	16 May 2010	All Blessed	23 October 2020	10 years, 5 months, 7 days	
Peaches	Rub	25 September 2015	No Lube So Rude	20 February 2026	10 years, 4 months, 26 days	
Limp Bizkit	Gold Cobra	28 June 2011	Still Sucks	31 October 2021	10 years, 4 months, 3 days	
The Cranberries	Wake Up and Smell the Coffee	22 October 2001	Roses	21 February 2012	10 years, 3 months, 30 days	
Richard Ashcroft	Keys to the World	23 January 2006	These People	20 May 2016	10 years, 3 months, 27 days	
Finger Eleven	Five Crooked Lines	31 July 2015	Last Night on Earth	7 November 2025	10 years, 3 months, 7 days	
Joey Ramone	Don't Worry About Me	19 February 2002	...Ya Know?	22 May 2012	10 years, 3 months, 3 days	
Johnny Cash	Out Among the Stars (Note: Originally recorded in 1981–1984)	25 March 2014	Songwriter (Note: Originally recorded in 1993)	28 June 2024	10 years, 3 months, 3 days	
Can	Can	July 1979	Rite Time	October 1989	10 years, 3 months	
Lyle Lovett	Release Me	28 February 2012	12th of June	13 May 2022	10 years, 2 months, 16 days	
Dinosaur Jr.	Hand It Over	25 March 1997	Beyond	1 May 2007	10 years, 1 month, 6 days	
Jennifer Hudson	JHUD	23 September 2014	The Gift of Love	18 October 2024	10 years, 25 days	
American Music Club	San Francisco	4 October 1994	Love Songs for Patriots	12 October 2004	10 years, 8 days	
Sigur Rós	Kveikur	12 June 2013	Átta	16 June 2023	10 years, 4 days	
Stevie Nicks	Trouble in Shangri-La	1 May 2001	In Your Dreams	3 May 2011	10 years, 2 days	
Vanessa Amorosi	Hazardous	6 November 2009	Back to Love	8 November 2019	10 years, 2 days	
Motion City Soundtrack	Panic Stations	18 September 2015	The Same Old Wasted Wonderful World	19 September 2025	10 years, 1 day	

== See also ==
- Lists of albums
