= Forbidden Evil (album) =

Studio album by Forbidden
- Released: September 30, 1988
- Recorded: 1988
- Studios: Alpha & Omega Recording and Studio 245 (San Francisco, CA), and Prairie Sun Recording Studios (Cotati, CA)
- Genre: Thrash metal
- Length: 42:54
- Labels: Combat (1988); Relativity (1992)
- Producers: John Cuniberti, Doug Caldwell

Forbidden chronology
| Forbidden Evil (1988) | Twisted into Form (1990) |

Professional ratings
Review scores
| Source | Rating |
|---|---|
| AllMusic | 4/5 stars |

Forbidden Evil is the debut album by American thrash metal band Forbidden, released in 1988. The title of the album refers to their original name before shortening it to Forbidden in 1987. The album was well received by both critics and fans and eventually became a cult classic. It is considered an essential release in the thrash metal genre.

== Background and recording ==
Forbidden Evil was produced by Doug Caldwell and John Cuniberti, best known for working with Joe Satriani, at Alpha & Omega Recording, Studio 245 (both located in San Francisco) and Prairie Sun Recording in Cotati. The album's recording sessions took place in mostly 1988.

The album features future Slayer drummer Paul Bostaph and three of the songs were co-written by Robb Flynn, who later played with Vio-lence and Machine Head – although he never played on the album.

As of 2009, it is the only Forbidden album to feature guitarist Glen Alvelais, who left in 1989 and would later join Testament (which had also featured Bostaph). He was replaced by Tim Calvert, who would remain with the band until their breakup in 1997.

The title track was covered by Temple of Blood on their 2008 release Overlord.

== Track listing ==
| No. | Title | Writer(s) | Length |
|---|---|---|---|
| 1. | "Chalice of Blood" | Russ Anderson, Robb Flynn | 4:27 |
| 2. | "Off the Edge" | Anderson, Glen Alvelais, Craig Locicero | 4:12 |
| 3. | "Through Eyes of Glass" | Anderson, Alvelais, Locicero | 6:18 |
| 4. | "Forbidden Evil" | Anderson, Locicero, Flynn | 5:35 |
| 5. | "March into Fire" | Locicero, Anderson | 5:05 |
| 6. | "Feel No Pain" | Alvelais, Locicero | 5:05 |
| 7. | "As Good as Dead" | Anderson, Locicero, Flynn | 4:11 |
| 8. | "Follow Me" | Locicero, Anderson, Alvelais | 7:00 |

2008 reissue bonus tracks
| No. | Title | Length |
|---|---|---|
| 9. | "Feel No Pain" | 4:50 |
| 10. | "As Good as Dead" | 4:08 |
| 11. | "Through Eyes of Glass" | 6:06 |
| 12. | "Chalice of Blood" | 4:46 |

- The 2008 reissue of the album from Century Media includes four live bonus tracks, all recorded at the Trocadero Theatre in Philadelphia, Pennsylvania on October 23, 1988

== Credits ==
- Russ Anderson – lead vocals
- Craig Locicero – guitars
- Glen Alvelais – guitars
- Matt Camacho – bass
- Paul Bostaph – drums
- Recorded at
  - Alpha & Omega Recording, San Francisco, California
  - Studio 245, San Francisco, California
  - Prairie Sun Recording, Cotati, California
- Produced by John Cuniberti and Doug Caldwell
- Recording engineered by John Cuniberti
- Assistant engineered by David Plank
- Mixed at Alpha & Omega
- Executive produced by Cliff Cultreri
- Mastered by Chris Bellman at Bernie Grundman, Los Angeles, California
- Cover art by Kent Mathieu
