= Rolling Sevens =

Single by ABC

from the album Skyscraping
- B-side: "Heaven Knows"
- Released: 30 June 1997
- Recorded: 1997
- Genre: New wave
- Label: Blatant
- Songwriters: Martin Fry, Glenn Gregory, Keith Lowndes
- Producer: Glenn Gregory

ABC singles chronology
"Skyscraping" (1997)	"Rolling Sevens" (1997)	"Peace And Tranquility" (2001)

"Rolling Sevens" is a song by the new wave group ABC, released as the third single from their seventh studio album Skyscraping (1997).

== Track listing ==
=== UK CD single ===
1. "Rolling Sevens"
2. "Heaven Knows"
3. "The Look of Love" (Live)
4. "All of My Heart" (Live)

=== UK promo CD single ===
1. "Rolling Sevens" (Radio edit)

== Chart performance ==
Chart (1997)	Peak position
UK Singles Chart	130
