= Stranger Things (ABC song) =

Single by ABC

from the album Skyscraping
- B-side: "The World Spins On", "All We Need"
- Released: 16 March 1997
- Recorded: 1997
- Genre: Pop
- Length: 5:18
- Label: Blatant
- Songwriters: Martin Fry; Glenn Gregory; Keith Lowndes
- Producers: Martin Fry; Glenn Gregory; Keith Lowndes

ABC singles chronology
"Say It" (1991)	"Stranger Things" (1997)	"Skyscraping" (1997)

"Stranger Things" is a song by the English pop band ABC, released as the first single from their seventh studio album Skyscraping (1997).

== Track listing ==
=== UK CD single ===
1. "Stranger Things" – 4:07
2. "The World Spins On" – 3:43
3. "All We Need" – 4:32
4. "Stranger Things" (Acoustic) – 5:06

== Chart performance ==
Chart (1997)	Peak position
UK Singles Chart	57
