= Distortion (Forbidden album) =

Studio album by Forbidden
- Released: November 30, 1994
- Studio: Music Annex, Menlo Park, California
- Genre: Groove metal; thrash metal
- Length: 59:00
- Label: GUN Records
- Producer: Patrick Coughlin & Forbidden

Forbidden chronology
Twisted into Form (1990)	Distortion (1994)	Green (1997)

Professional ratings
Review scores
Source	Rating
AllMusic	2/5 stars
Rock Hard	9/10 stars

Distortion is the third studio album by American thrash metal band Forbidden. It was released four years after their second album, Twisted into Form, changing their early thrash style to embrace a slower style, presaging the groove metal sound of their next album, Green (1997).

== Track listing ==
All tracks written by Forbidden unless otherwise stated.

No.	Title	Length
1.	"Distortion"	5:59
2.	"Hypnotized by the Rhythm"	4:56
3.	"Rape"	5:22
4.	"No Reason"	6:23
5.	"Feed the Hand"	6:41
6.	"Wake Up"	3:57
7.	"Mind's 'I'"	4:31
8.	"All That Is"	4:17
9.	"Undertaker"	6:24
10.	"21st Century Schizoid Man" (King Crimson cover)	11:06

Japanese edition bonus track
No.	Title	Length
11.	"Rip Ride" (Venom cover)	3:06

- At the end of "21st Century Schizoid Man", after 1:30 of silence, a hidden track can be heard, an instrumental called "Annexanax" (2:11).

== Personnel ==
- Russ Anderson – lead vocals
- Craig Locicero – guitars
- Tim Calvert – guitars
- Matt Camacho – bass
- Steve Jacobs – drums
- Recorded at Music Annex, Menlo Park, California
- Produced by Patrick Coughlin and Forbidden
- Engineered by Patrick Coughlin
