= Omega Wave =

Studio album by Forbidden
- Released: October 22, 2010
- Recorded: 2009–2010
- Genre: Thrash metal
- Length: 61:33
- Label: Nuclear Blast
- Producers: Craig Locicero, Tim Narducci

Forbidden chronology
Green (1997)	Omega Wave (2010)	Forbidden (2026)

Omega Wave is the fifth studio album by American thrash metal band Forbidden, released on October 22, 2010. It was the band's first studio recording in 13 years (since 1997's Green) and the first album to feature two new band members, Steve Smyth on guitar and Mark Hernandez on drums. This is also the final Forbidden studio album to feature vocalist Russ Anderson.

== Production ==
The album was produced by guitarist Craig Locicero and former Systematic frontman Tim Narducci. The two had been friends since the age of 15 and together formed the band Spiralarms in 2004. Also enlisted for Omega Wave was mixer Sean Beavan whose previous work included Marilyn Manson and Slayer. Locicero met Beavan during the 2003 recording of Manmade God's self-titled album. He learned a great deal from him about record production and expressed enthusiasm for his part in Omega Wave:

I still can't believe how lucky we are to have Sean to do it. Sonically, he's very unique and on a different level. He's produced, engineered, and mixed some of the best sounding material out there. . . Sean will make the Forbidden record sound like nothing else going, and that's a great thing.

== Album title ==
On May 3, 2010, guitarist Craig Locicero commented on the album's title:

After a year of writing and a couple of months recording this son of a bitchin' album, we've finally decided to call it Omega Wave. It certainly would have been easy to self-title it, but anyone who knows anything about Forbidden and our history understands that we spend a considerable amount of time thinking about these things. That's just what we do. Omega Wave seemed most fitting and it's one of the thrashiest songs on the record! An "omega wave" is the feeling of impending doom that hangs over everyone in these difficult times, more so than any other era in history. Many feel that our time is almost up, partly because it has been written and predicted in almost every ancient society; also because most people can tell which way the wind is blowing, if you know what I mean. So the question is, is this all really happening by design or is it a self-fulfilled, man-made hysteria that we are creating by accepting it in our collective consciousness? Either way, it's a black wave of negative energy that exists to billions of people. That is the Omega Wave.

== Reception ==
Reviews for the album have generally been positive.

Professional ratings
Review scores
Source	Rating
About.com	4.5/5 stars
Metal Hammer	(6/7)
Leave the Hall	3.5/5 stars
AllMusic	3.5/5 stars

== Track listing ==
The track listing is as follows:

No.	Title	Lyrics	Music	Length
1.	"Alpha Century" (instrumental)	—	Locicero	2:00
2.	"Forsaken at the Gates"	Anderson, Locicero	Locicero, Smyth, Hernandez, Anderson	4:53
3.	"Overthrow"	Anderson, Locicero	Locicero, Smyth, Hernandez	4:43
4.	"Adapt or Die"	Anderson, Locicero	Locicero, Hernandez, Anderson	5:14
5.	"Swine"	Anderson, Locicero	Locicero, Smyth, Hernandez	6:30
6.	"Chatter"			2:16
7.	"Dragging My Casket"	Anderson, Locicero, Camacho	Locicero, Smyth, Hernandez, Camacho, Anderson	6:47
8.	"Hopenosis"	Anderson, Locicero	Locicero, Hernandez, Camacho, Anderson	5:14
9.	"Immortal Wounds"	Anderson, Locicero	Locicero, Hernandez	5:29
10.	"Behind the Mask"	Anderson, Locicero	Locicero, Smyth, Hernandez, Anderson	5:39
11.	"Inhuman Race"	Anderson, Locicero	Locicero, Smyth, Hernandez, Anderson	6:25
12.	"Omega Wave"	Anderson, Locicero	Locicero, Smyth, Hernandez, Anderson	6:00

== Personnel ==
- Russ Anderson – lead vocals
- Craig Locicero – guitars
- Steve Smyth – guitars
- Matt Camacho – bass
- Mark Hernandez – drums
