= Skyscraping (song) =

Single by ABC

from the album Skyscraping
- B-side: "Light Years", "Skydubbing"
- Released: 12 May 1997
- Recorded: 1997
- Genre: New wave
- Label: Blatant
- Songwriters: Martin Fry, Glenn Gregory, Keith Lowndes
- Producers: Martin Fry, Glenn Gregory, Keith Lowndes

ABC singles chronology
"Stranger Things" (1997)	"Skyscraping" (1997)	"Rolling Sevens" (1997)

"Skyscraping" is a song by the English pop band ABC, released as the second single from their seventh studio album Skyscraping (1997).

== Track listing ==
=== UK CD single ===
1. "Skyscraping"
2. "Light Years"
3. "Skydubbing"
4. "Stranger Things" (Live)

=== UK promo CD single ===
1. "Skyscraping" (Radio edit)

== Chart performance ==
Chart (1997)	Peak position
UK singles chart	93
