= Tim Calvert =

American guitarist (1965–2018)

- Born: November 7, 1965; Alameda County, California
- Died: April 30, 2018 (aged 52) Twain Harte, California
- Genres: Heavy metal, progressive metal, thrash metal, neo-classical metal
- Occupation: Musician
- Instruments: Guitar, bass
- Years active: 1980s–2000
- Formerly of: Forbidden; Nevermore

Timothy K. Calvert (November 7, 1965 – April 30, 2018) was an American metal guitarist. He was known for his dark, moody style of songwriting created through his frequent usage of dissonant passages and diminished chords. He was associated with the bands Forbidden and Nevermore.

Calvert was an accomplished guitar player who played in a neoclassical style, featuring an abundance of arpeggios and sweep-picking. He started guitar lessons with Bob Marshall in Castro Valley and eventually took lessons from Jim Bedford in Hayward, California for about 10 years. He played Jackson Guitars throughout his entire career.

== Career ==
He began his career in the mid-1980s in a thrash metal band called Militia before joining Forbidden in 1989. He made his recording debut in 1990 with the band on their second album Twisted into Form, co-writing much of the material and bringing a darker and more progressive sound than its predecessor, Forbidden Evil.

Calvert played on two more Forbidden albums, Distortion in 1994 and Green in 1997. After the dissolution of Forbidden, Calvert was asked to replace Pat O'Brien in the progressive thrash metal band Nevermore. Nevermore wanted Tim as their second guitarist because lead singer Warrel Dane and bassist Jim Sheppard had toured together with Calvert in the early 1990s when Dane and Sheppard played with Sanctuary and Calvert was in Forbidden. Dane stated in an interview he and Sheppard were amazed by Calvert's technique and were very happy when Tim accepted their invitation. Calvert played on and contributed to their classic concept album Dreaming Neon Black, released in 1999.

Calvert left Nevermore in 2000 after the Dreaming Neon Black tour ended to pursue a full-time career as a pilot, attending school and working in Seattle initially before moving to San Luis Obispo, California for his first assignment, then Salt Lake City, Utah and later Minneapolis, Minnesota. His entire professional piloting career was with SkyWest Airlines.

In 2010, it was announced Calvert and a number of other prominent metal musicians were supposed to make an appearance on the first album of an AC/DC tribute band formed by Bay Area veteran vocalist Steve "Zetro" Souza called AC/DZ, but the album has yet to be released.

== Death ==
Calvert died on April 30, 2018, of complications from amyotrophic lateral sclerosis. He was 52.
