= Twisted into Form =

Studio album by Forbidden
- Released: March 30, 1990
- Recorded: 1989–1990
- Studios: Fantasy Studios, Berkeley, California
- Genre: Thrash metal
- Length: 41:09
- Labels: Combat (1990); Relativity (1992)
- Producer: Michael Rosen

Forbidden chronology
Forbidden Evil (1988)	Twisted into Form (1990)	Distortion (1994)

Professional ratings
Review scores
Source	Rating
AllMusic	2.5/5 stars
Kerrang!	4/5 stars

Twisted into Form is the second studio album by American thrash metal band Forbidden. It features one line-up change from their debut – 1988's Forbidden Evil – with Tim Calvert replacing Glen Alvelais on guitar. The result is a more melodic and progressive affair with many acoustic interludes and clearer production, but less of a raw edge than its predecessor. It is their last album with drummer Paul Bostaph before he joined Slayer in 1992 when Forbidden was on hiatus.

== Track listing ==
No.	Title	Lyrics	Music	Length
1.	"Parting of the Ways" (instrumental)	—	Calvert, Locicero	1:05
2.	"Infinite"	Locicero	Calvert, Locicero, Bostaph	5:57
3.	"Out of Body (Out of Mind)"	Locicero, Anderson	Calvert, Locicero, Bostaph	4:34
4.	"Step by Step"	Locicero, Anderson	Calvert, Locicero, Bostaph	4:52
5.	"Twisted into Form"	Locicero	Calvert, Locicero, Bostaph	4:26
6.	"R.I.P."	Anderson	Calvert, Locicero, Bostaph	7:37
7.	"Spiral Depression" (instrumental)	—	Calvert, Locicero	1:49
8.	"Tossed Away"	Locicero	Calvert, Locicero, Bostaph	4:36
9.	"One Foot in Hell"	Locicero	Locicero, Bostaph	6:13

=== 1998 Century Media re-release ===
No.	Title	Writer(s)	Length
10.	"As Good as Dead" (live)	Anderson, Locicero, Flynn	4:09
11.	"Chalice of Blood" (live)	Anderson, Flynn	4:49

- These are taken from The Ultimate Revenge 2.

=== 2008 Century Media re-release ===
No.	Title	Writer(s)	Length
10.	"Victim of Changes" (live)	Atkins, Halford, Downing, Tipton	8:20
11.	"Forbidden Evil" (live)	Anderson, Locicero, Flynn	5:43
12.	"Chalice of Blood" (live)	Anderson, Flynn	5:45
13.	"Through Eyes of Glass" (live)	Anderson, Alvelais, Locicero	6:20

- These are taken from Raw Evil: Live at the Dynamo.

== Personnel ==
- Russ Anderson – lead vocals
- Craig Locicero – guitars
- Tim Calvert – guitars
- Matt Camacho – bass
- Paul Bostaph – drums
- Death Angel, The Horde of Torment – backing vocals on "Out of Body" and "R.I.P."
- Recorded at Fantasy Studios, Berkeley, California
- Produced and engineered by Michael Rosen
- Assistant engineer for basic tracks by Mike Semanick
- Mastered by Howie Weinberg at Masterdisk
- Cover art by Kent Mathieu
