= Temple of Blood =

American Christian metal band

- Origin: Huntsville, Alabama, U.S.
- Genres: Heavy metal, thrash metal, speed metal, Christian metal
- Years active: 2001–present
- Members: Jim Mullis; Garth Lovvorn; Jeremy Townsend; Drew Trotter
- Past members: Lance Wright; Harry Coleman Jr. Matt Barnes; Jim Lewis; David Keeton
- Website: templeofblood.net

Temple of Blood 2005 band photo

Temple of Blood is an American Christian metal band based out of Huntsville, Alabama.

== History ==
=== Early years ===
Temple of Blood formed in late 2001 as a power trio consisting of chief songwriter Jim Mullis on lead vocals and guitar, Garth Lovvorn on bass guitar and backing vocals, and Lance Wright on drums. At that time they mostly played cover songs from bands like Megadeth, Annihilator, Death, Iron Maiden as they developed their musical abilities.

=== Prepare for the Judgement of Mankind ===
In 2006 they released their first album Prepare for the Judgement of Mankind which was received with much critical acclaim. Terrorizer called the release "impressive" and said "[Temple of Blood] certainly have the power of the Lord coursing through their frantically fretting fingertips". Brave Words & Bloody Knuckles magazine said "With no shortage of speed or great guitar work, the music is undeniably technical and well-played". Heaven's Metal opined: "I like this disc a whole lot, the guitar riffs are fun, the music is intense and, with the exception of a couple of lackluster tunes the songs on here just crush." Metal Rules called the release "... damn fine quality thrash metal ... like the big 4 used to play.".

The album was mastered by Sterling Winfield, who had also produced releases from Pantera and King Diamond. The final track on the debut album is a cover of the Deadly Blessing song "Deliver Us From Evil". The song features a special guest, Ski, who himself was the singer for Deadly Blessing and has formed his own band called Faith Factor. Ski had applied to replace the departed Rob Halford in Judas Priest when Halford left the band in 1993. The album has been re-released by Alone Records.

=== Overlord ===
The band released their second album Overlord in the spring of 2008, which also received very positive reviews from metal zines around the world. The album contains a cover version of the song "Forbidden Evil", by the Bay Area thrash band Forbidden. The album was remastered by Jamie King, who had also remastered albums for such artists as Watchtower, Cro-Mags, and Chastain, and was re-released by Alone Records. Snakepit Magazine called it an improvement over the debut: "... this album by the Alabama-based bunch simply blows away their previous one!". Heaven's Metal magazine describes the remastered Overlord album as "... an album that ranks up with the BEST of them". Metal Rules also remarked : "... an improvement in every way over PREPARE ... OVERLORD is simply a great album that all thrash fans should check out.".

=== Recent years ===
After the release of "Overlord", James Lewis left the band, being temporarily replaced by Kelly Conlon (ex-Death).

== Members ==
Current members

- Jim Mullis – vocals, guitar (2001–present) (ex-Cauldron Born)
- Garth Lovvorn – bass, backing vocals (2001–2006, 2012–present) (ex-Chaos Inception, ex-Fleshtized)
- Jeremy Townsend - guitar (2025-present)
- Drew Trotter - drums (2025-present)

Session members

- Scott Fuller – drums (2020) (Morbid Angel, ex-Havok)
- Aurélien Gonzalez – guitar (2022) (Dead Tree Seeds)

Former members

- James "Jim" Lewis – bass (2006–2009) (ex-Antithesis)
- Matt Barnes – guitar, backing vocals (2004–2013) (Monstrosity, Diabolic)
- David Keeton – drums, backing vocals (2016–2020)
- Kelly Conlon – bass (2011) (ex-Death, ex-Monstrosity)
- Lance Wright – drums (2001–2016, 2022–2025) (ex-Vile)
- Harry Coleman, Jr. - guitar (ex-Humanicide)

Timeline

== Discography ==
- Prepare for the Judgement of Mankind (2006)
- Overlord (2008)

=== Compilation appearances ===
- "Realm of Insufferable Burning (The Horrors of Hell)" on Knuckletracks Volume 96 CD (Brave Words and Bloody Knuckles, 2006)
- "Realm of Insufferable Burning (The Horrors of Hell)" on Metal Crusade Volume 12 CD (Heavy magazine, 2006)
- "Fearsome Warrior (remastered)" on Thrashmageddon Volume 1 CD (Roxx Records and Metal for a Dark World, 2013)
- "Destruction of the Twin Cities" on Light Prevails CD (Christian Rock & Fellowship, 2008)
