= When You're Smiling (Regis Philbin album) =

Studio album by Regis Philbin
- Released: September 28, 2004
- Genre: Easy listening
- Length: 36:51
- Label: Hollywood
- Producer: Steve Tyrell; Bob Mann

Regis Philbin chronology
It's Time for Regis! (1968)	When You're Smiling (2004)	Just You. Just Me. (2009)

Professional ratings
Review scores
Source	Rating
Allmusic	3/5 stars

When You're Smiling is Regis Philbin's second studio album, his first in more than 30 years. In his own words, "When I grew up, it was the age of the great crooners. So, as a New York City kid, I wanted to be a singer. When I was 5, I knew every song Bing Crosby sang."

== Track listing ==
No.	Title	Writer(s)	Length
1.	"You Make Me Feel So Young"	Josef Myrow; Mack Gordon	3:22
2.	"Pennies From Heaven"	Arthur Johnston; Johnny Burke	3:17
3.	"It Had To Be You"	Isham Jones; Gus Kahn	3:07
4.	"When You're Smiling"	Larry Shay; Mark Fisher; Joe Goodwin	3:13
5.	"I Can't Give You Anything But Love"	Dorothy Fields; Jimmy McHugh	2:43
6.	"They Can't Take That Away From Me"	George Gershwin; Ira Gershwin	2:42
7.	"The Very Thought Of You"	Ray Noble	3:54
8.	"Cheek To Cheek"	Irving Berlin	3:54
9.	"What'll I Do"	Irving Berlin	3:05
10.	"You're Nobody 'Til Somebody Loves You"	James Cavanaugh; Russ Morgan; Larry Stock	2:37
11.	"Exactly Like You"	Dorothy Fields; Jimmy McHugh	2:21
12.	"Too Ra Loo Ra Loo Ral" (with Ronan Tynan)	James Royce Shannon	2:36
Total length:			36:51

== Musicians ==
- Regis Philbin: Vocals
- Allan Schwartzberg: Drums
- Kenny Ascher: Keyboards
- Bob Mann: Guitar
- Charles "Chip" Jackson: Bass (tracks 1, 2, 4, 11)
- Ed Howard: Bass (tracks 3, 5, 8, 9, 10)
- David Finck: Bass (tracks 6, 7)
- Warren Vaché: Trumpet solos (tracks 1, 3, 5)
- Warren Luening: Trumpet solos (tracks 7, 8, 11)
- Robert Sheppard: Saxophone solos (tracks 4, 10)
- Background vocals: Dorian Holley, Mortinette Jenkins, Marlena Jeter, Steve Tyrell

All track information and credits were taken from the CD liner notes.
