= Manmade God =

American rock band

- Origin: Oakland, California, U.S.
- Genre: Hard rock
- Years active: 2001–2004, 2012–present
- Label: American Recordings
- Past members: Ahrue Luster; Michael H. Sullivan aka Mike Green; Matt Camacho; Steve Jacobs; Craig Locicero; Pann Reed; James Walker
- Website: Manmade God on Facebook

Manmade God were an American hard rock band from Oakland, California. They gained prominence in 2003, touring with various mainstream acts and releasing one self-titled album in late summer. They disbanded the following year, however, with the departure of their vocalist and an apparent split with their record label, which was American Recordings.

== History ==
=== Early years (2001–2002) ===
Formed upon the hiatus of Forbidden in 2001, Manmade God featured both its guitarist Craig Locicero and drummer Steve Jacobs. The new project was joined by bassist James Walker and filled out when Locicero came across a newspaper ad by Pann Reed, a singer on the verge of ending his attempts at music success. The guitarist reflected, "Before Pann joined, we were more of a finger painting experiment; it never felt like a band. Pann just made all the difference, having direction and emotion."

Within two weeks of formation, Manmade God debuted at the Boomerang Club and played elsewhere in the San Francisco Bay area. They soon met Stone Temple Pilots drummer Eric Kretz who was impressed enough to produce their 3-song demo. While playing, the group soon realized they were not ready to showcase for major labels yet and continued recording. Their material caught the attention of Brian Joseph Dobbs who helped record their next demo at The Plant Studios in Sausalito, California.

According to Locicero, "Every management company wanted us; major labels were knocking themselves over to get to us." The demos with Dobbs gained response from American Recordings and prompted a private showcase with label head Rick Rubin. Manmade God signed into American in October 2002 and soon began working on their self-titled debut with Dobbs as producer and Rubin as executive producer.

=== Manmade God (2003–2004) ===
The band toured heavily the following year, playing alongside doubleDrive in spring. Throughout the summer, Manmade God toured across the US with established acts such as Adema, Powerman 5000, Ra, Spineshank, Taproot, and Type O Negative.

Initially set for a July 29 release, Manmade God finally hit shelves on August 26, 2003. Locicero alleged years later that the delay was because the head of both Columbia and Island Records had "turned out" during the recording of Manmade God.

The album gained both positive and mixed reception; Robert L. Doerschuk of AllMusic offered a 3/5 rating and proclaimed, "Throughout their eponymous album, they hammer and thrash with a ponderous intensity. This has been familiar territory since Led Zeppelin trashed its first private jet." IGN's Dave Doray gave a meager 5/10 rating, noting how it "just doesn't introduce us to anything new" while comparing the vocals to Chris Cornell and bass to Tim Commerford. However, positive response was given to the musical interplay on various tracks. Melodic.net and MetalSucks.net offered stronger support with the latter calling it "tremendous" and describing Pann's vocal performance as "a soulful, gritty version of Filter's Richard Patrick."

Manmade God was compared stylistically to classic groups like The Doors, Led Zeppelin, and Black Sabbath. It was frequently said to have drawn heavily from the more contemporary grunge bands Soundgarden and Stone Temple Pilots. The album boasted one single, "Safe Passage", which reached No. 36 on the Billboard's Mainstream Rock Tracks.

In December, the band headlined KSJO's Homegrown concert at The Edge in Palo Alto. Eric Kretz stood in for an allegedly injured Steve Jacobs for half of the show where Pann expressed to the crowd his disenchantment with the band's lack of exposure, spouting, "You guys are the first to know who we are, 'cause no one knows who we are." In addition to performing nearly every track from their debut album, Manmade God also played a new song entitled "Awakening" which Pann wryly noted would be on the band's next record if they make it that far.

Manmade God toured into the following year but continued experiencing turbulence with their label. While performing with SOiL in March, the band's touring support was pulled, further frustrating its members.

=== Disestablishment and formation of Spiralarms ===
Having their touring support removed proved to be the last straw when, a week later, Reed left Manmade God. In a 2011 interview, Locicero reflected that, despite its promising future, Manmade God was "a victim of bad timing" because of label issues causing their album's delay.

Locicero added that while his decision may not have been the right one at the time, it allowed him to work on other projects in the future that Manmade God would have prevented.

In April 2004, shortly after the demise of Manmade God, fellow California group Systematic also disbanded. It was reported soon after that Systematic frontman Tim Narducci was forming an as yet unnamed group with the former guitarist, drummer, and bassist of Manmade God. Narducci had in fact been friends with Locicero since the age of 15 and the two bonded through a common passion for heavy metal. The new group officially named itself Spiralarms and played their first concert together at The Pound in San Francisco on June 5. Referring to himself as Manmade God's new frontman, Narducci explained, "We changed our name due a number of reasons, mostly political, but most importantly the sound. . . It's much different then what those guys [Manmade God] were doing before and much different even for myself." He also enthusiastically reported to have written sixteen complete songs with his new band. In 2010, Spiralarms released their debut album, Highest Society, and intend to release their second album, Freedom, in Feb-March 2013.

In early 2005, Jacobs suffered a shoulder injury that necessitated his removal from the group. By 2007, Locicero would be the only ex-Manmade God member to remain in Spiralarms and would also be back with the reunited Forbidden. Spiralarms would now include drummer Chris Kontos (ex-Machine Head and Testament), bassist Chris Lombardom, and keyboardist Brad Barth.

=== Reformation of Manmade God (2012) ===
On July 21, 2012, the reformation of the original line up played a reunion show at "The New Parish" club in Oakland, California. The band planned on writing and recording all new material, as well as playing local, national, and international shows.

In July 2014, Reed and Walker created a new band by the name of Orion. Orion's line-up also includes Andy Weller (lead/rhythm guitar) and Jeff Gomes (drums). While Reed only sang for Manmade God, in Orion he sings and plays guitar (both rhythm and lead). Their independently produced debut album, "Live the Song", consists of seven new songs. According to Walker, an additional ten songs were written and there were plans for a second album. Sources close to Reed and Walker said they were very excited about the new project, and that they were more involved in this band than they were in Manmade God. Orion began touring for the album in August 2015. Within a year, the group disbanded.

== Band members ==
- Pann Reed – vocals
- Craig Locicero – guitars
- James Walker – bass
- Steve Jacobs – drums

== Discography ==
- Manmade God (2003)

== Chart performance ==
Single	Mainstream Rock Tracks	Album
"Safe Passage"	36	Manmade God
