= Skyscraping =

Studio album by ABC
- Released: 24 March 1997
- Genre: Pop
- Length: 51:11
- Label: Blatant; Deconstruction
- Producer: Martin Fry; Glenn Gregory; Keith Lowndes

ABC chronology
Abracadabra (1991)	Skyscraping (1997)	The Lexicon of Live (1999)

Professional ratings
Review scores
Source	Rating
AllMusic	3/5 stars
The Encyclopedia of Popular Music	3/5 stars
NME	5/10

Skyscraping is the seventh studio album by the English pop band ABC, released on 24 March 1997 by Blatant and Deconstruction Records. The album was produced as a homage to lead vocalist Martin Fry's several musical heroes, including David Bowie, Roxy Music and the Sex Pistols.

It is their first album without founding member, keyboardist and guitarist Mark White, who had up until that point been heavily involved in the composition and production of their work. As the line-up of ABC without White consisted solely of Fry, Glenn Gregory of Heaven 17 and Keith Lowndes were brought in as songwriting and performance collaborators. The album was met with positive reviews from critics but little commercial success.

Three singles were released: "Stranger Things", "Skyscraping" and "Rolling Sevens". An expanded 2CD edition of the album was released by Cherry Red Records on 23 September 2013.

In September 2022, the album was finally released on Spotify and other digital platforms.

It was released on vinyl for the first time in 2024, as a limited edition of 1000 individually numbered copies on white and blue marble vinyl.

== Track listing ==
All songs written and composed by Martin Fry, Glenn Gregory, and Keith Lowndes except where indicated.

=== 1997 Blatant/Deconstruction 74321 45653 2/BMG Japan BVCP-6029 ===
1. "Stranger Things" – 5:18
2. "Ask a Thousand Times" – 5:13
3. "Skyscraping" – 4:20
4. "Who Can I Turn To?" – 3:48
5. "Rolling Sevens" – 4:31
6. "Only The Best Will Do" – 4:19
7. "Love Is Its Own Reward" – 4:08
8. "Light Years" – 6:40
9. "Seven Day Weekend" (John Uriel) – 3:31
10. "Heaven Knows" – 3:59
11. "Faraway" – 5:20
12. "Stranger Things (Acoustic Version)" (Japan only) – 5:09

=== 2013 Cherry Pop Remaster bonus disc ===
1. "The World Spins On" ("Stranger Things" B-side) – 3:44
2. "All We Need" ("Stranger Things" B-side) – 4:33
3. "Stranger Things" (Acoustic) – 5:09
4. "Skydubbing" (dub mix of "Skyscraping") – 7:27
5. "Stranger Things" (Live) – 4:55
6. "Rolling Sevens" (Radio Edit) – 3:33
7. "The Look of Love" (Live) – 3:54
8. "All of My Heart" (Live) – 5:53
9. "Skyscraping" (Alternate Version) – 4:16

== Chart performance ==
Chart (1997)	Peak position
UK Albums Chart	97

== Personnel ==
ABC

- Martin Fry – lead vocals, backing vocals

Musicians

- Keith Lowndes – keyboards, guitars, drum programming
- Glenn Gregory – additional keyboards (1, 2, 5, 6, 8, 10), backing vocals (1, 2, 4–6, 9, 10)
- Paul Rabiger – additional acoustic piano (2), saxophone (2, 4, 8)
- Phil 'Snake' Davies – saxophone (7)
- Dinah Bemish – cello (1, 3, 4)
- Jocelyn Pook – viola (1, 3, 4)
- Sally Herbert – violin (1, 3, 4)
- Sonia Slany – violin (1)
- Jules Singleton – violin (3, 4)
- Carol Kenyon – backing vocals (2, 5, 10)
- Juliet Roberts – backing vocals (3, 4, 11)
- Paul 'Tubbs' Williams – backing vocals (3, 4, 11)

Production and artwork

- Martin Fry – producer
- Glenn Gregory – producer
- Keith Lowndes – producer
- Danton Supple – recording (1, 3, 7, 11), mixing (1–4, 6, 7, 10, 11)
- Paul Rabiger – recording (2, 4–6, 8–10), mixing (5, 8, 9)
- Farrow Design – art direction, design
- Andy Earl – photography

== See also ==
- Honeyroot (The ambient music project of Glenn Gregory and Keith Lowndes)
