= Forbidden (Forbidden album) =

Studio album by Forbidden
- Released: October 23, 2026
- Recorded: 2025—2026
- Studio: Shark Bite (Oakland, California)
- Genre: Thrash metal
- Length: 62:30
- Label: BlkIIBlk
- Producers: Craig Locicero; Chris Kontos; Zack Ohren

Forbidden chronology
| Omega Wave (2010) | Forbidden (2026) |

Singles from Forbidden
- 1. "Divided by Zero" Released: June 26, 2025; 2. "Mutually Assured Dysfunction" Released: October 2, 2025; 3. "Psyclops" Released: July 22, 2026; 4. "Burning the Lungs of Earth" Released: September 9, 2026

Forbidden is the sixth studio album by the American thrash metal band Forbidden, released on October 23, 2026. This is the band's first studio album since Omega Wave (2010), making it the longest gap between two albums in their career. It is also the band's first recording with vocalist Norman Skinner and guitarist Jeremy Von Epp, and only with Chris Kontos, who left Forbidden nearly two weeks after its release.

== Track listing ==
Forbidden track listing
| No. | Title | Writer(s) | Length |
|---|---|---|---|
| 1. | "Single Point Failure" | Jeremy Von Epp; Craig Locicero; Chris Kontos; Norman Skinner | 5:05 |
| 2. | "Burning the Lungs of Earth" | Locicero; Von Epp; Kontos; Skinner | 5:13 |
| 3. | "Divided by Zero" | Locicero; Kontos; Skinner; Daniel Mongrain; Matt Camacho | 5:06 |
| 4. | "DCLXVI" | Locicero; Kontos; Skinner | 6:41 |
| 5. | "Psyclops" | Locicero; Von Epp; Kontos; Skinner | 4:50 |
| 6. | "Jisei" | Locicero; Skinner; Kontos; Von Epp | 3:36 |
| 7. | "Mutually Assured Dysfunction" | Locicero; Kontos; Skinner; Mongrain; Camacho | 6:15 |
| 8. | "Sycophantasy" (featuring Brann Dailor) | Locicero; Von Epp; Kontos; Skinner | 4:15 |
| 9. | "The Burden" (featuring Kayla Dixon) | Locicero; Kontos; Skinner; Steve Smyth | 5:43 |
| 10. | "Sol Grave" | Locicero; Kontos; Skinner | 6:21 |
| 11. | "Flower of Life (Chaos by Design)" | Locicero; Kontos; Skinner; Mongrain; Camacho | 9:25 |
| Total length: | | | 62:30 |

Vinyl release bonus track
| No. | Title | Writer(s) | Length |
|---|---|---|---|
| 7. | "Sirens" | Criss Oliva; Jon Oliva |

== Personnel ==
Credits are adapted from the album's liner notes.

=== Forbidden ===
- Norman Skinner – vocals
- Craig Locicero – guitars, production, choir vocals
- Jeremy Von Epp – guitars
- Matt Camacho – bass
- Chris Kontos – drums, production, choir vocals

=== Additional contributors ===
- Zack Ohren – production, recording, mixing
- Justin Shturtz – mastering
- Harald Oimoen – executive production
- Beto Ferris – artwork
- Phil Emerson – photos
- Daniel Mongrain – guitars on "Divided by Zero", "Mutually Assured Dysfunction", and "Flower of Life (Chaos by Design)
- Brann Dailor – vocals on "Sycophantasy"
- Kayla Dixon – vocals on "The Burden"
- Michelle Pender – spoken word on "Jisei"
- Benjamin Jack Shirley – orchestration and arrangement on "Flower of Life"
- Charles "Dobber" Beverly – piano on "Flower of Life"
- Graham Patzner – violin on "Flower of Life"
- Aaron Robitsch – keyboards on "DCLXVI", "Sol Grave", and "Jisei"
- Billy Garoutte – choir vocals
- Cody Stein – choir vocals
- George Anderson – choir vocals
- Zack Garcia – choir vocals

== Charts ==
Chart performance for Forbidden
| Chart (2026) | Peak position |
|---|---|
| Belgian Albums (Ultratop Wallonia) | 151 |
| French Physical Albums (SNEP) | 166 |
| French Rock & Metal Albums (SNEP) | 49 |
| German Albums (Offizielle Top 100) | 81 |
| Scottish Albums (Official Charts) | 89 |
| Swiss Albums (Schweizer Hitparade) | 79 |
| UK Independent Albums (Official Charts) | 38 |
| UK Rock & Metal Albums (Official Charts) | 23 |
