= Green (Forbidden album) =

Studio album by Forbidden
- Released: March 21, 1997
- Genre: Groove metal
- Length: 40:54
- Label: GUN
- Producers: Patrick Coughlin & Forbidden

Forbidden chronology
Distortion (1994)	Green (1997)	Omega Wave (2010)

Professional ratings
Review scores
Source	Rating
AllMusic	3/5 stars

Green is the fourth studio album by American thrash metal band Forbidden. Released in 1997, the sound of this album was a departure from the band's previous albums, focusing on a rather slower and experimental sound, which presented a mixture of alternative and groove metal. This would mark the band's last studio album to feature guitarist Tim Calvert and drummer Steve Jacobs as well as their last studio album for another thirteen years.

== Track listing ==
No.	Title	Length
1.	"What Is the Last Time?"	2:34
2.	"Green"	3:17
3.	"Phat"	3:32
4.	"Turns to Rage"	5:48
5.	"Face Down Heroes"	3:44
6.	"Over the Middle"	3:19
7.	"Kanaworms"	3:23
8.	"Noncent$"	3:54
9.	"Blank"	5:54
10.	"Focus"	5:29
Total length:		40:54

Hidden tracks
No.	Title	Length
1.	"Silence"	2:00
2.	"Silence"	2:00
3.	"Silence"	2:00
4.	"Silence"	7:12

== Credits ==
- Russ Anderson – lead vocals
- Craig Locicero – guitars
- Tim Calvert – guitars
- Matt Camacho – bass
- Steve Jacobs – drums
- Produced by Patrick Coughlin and Forbidden
- Mastered by Steve Hall
