= Testament discography =

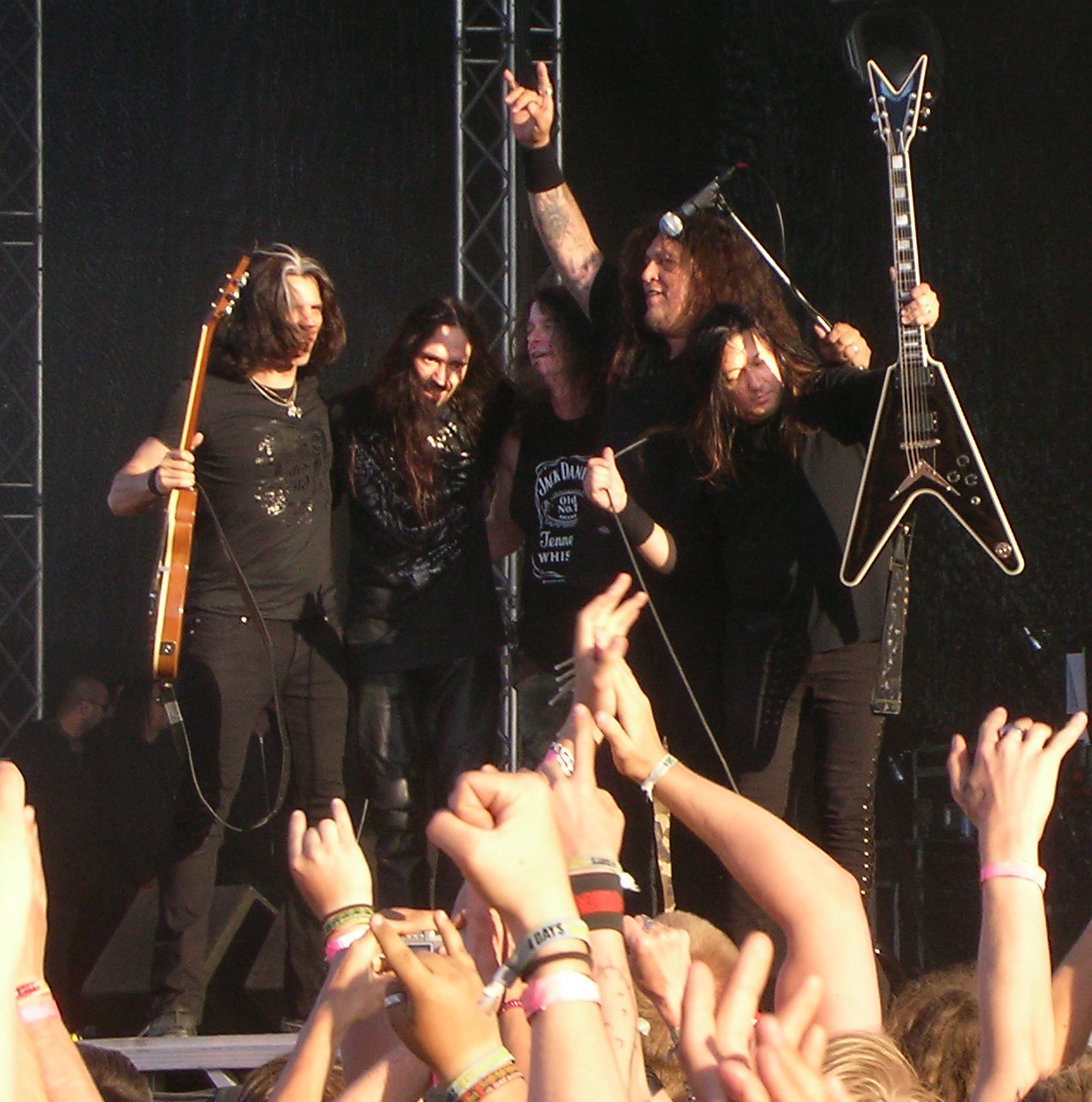
- Testament at Sweden Rock 2008
- Studio albums: 14
- Extended plays: 2
- Live albums: 4
- Compilation albums: 5
- Singles: 13
- Video albums: 3

The discography of San Francisco-based thrash metal band Testament consists of fourteen studio albums, four live albums, five compilations, two extended plays, thirteen singles, and three video albums. Originally forming in 1983 under the name Legacy they released two demos titled Demo 1 and Demo 2 and have since gone on to become one of the most influential thrash metal bands of all time. The band has gone through numerous lineup changes with the only constant member being guitarist Eric Peterson.

== Studio albums ==
Title	Album details	Peak chart positions												Sales
Title	Album details	US	AUS	AUT	CAN	FIN	FRA	GER	JPN	NLD	SWE	SWI	UK	Sales
The Legacy	Released: April 21, 1987; Label: Atlantic/Megaforce	—	—	—	—	—	—	—	—	—	—	—	—	US: 150,000+
The New Order	Released: May 5, 1988; Label: Atlantic/Megaforce	136	—	—	—	—	—	49	—	66	49	—	81	US: 250,000+
Practice What You Preach	Released: August 8, 1989; Label: Atlantic/Megaforce	77	—	—	—	—	—	29	—	57	—	—	40	US: 450,000+
Souls of Black	Released: October 9, 1990; Label: Atlantic/Megaforce	73	—	—	—	—	—	—	—	—	—	—	35	
The Ritual	Released: May 1992; Label: Atlantic	55	—	—	78	—	—	73	—	—	—	—	48	US: 485,000+
Low	Released: September 30, 1994; Label: Atlantic	122	—	—	—	—	—	—	—	—	—	39	—	
Demonic	Released: June 24, 1997; Label: Spitfire	—	—	—	—	—	—	—	—	—	—	—	—	
The Gathering	Released: June 8, 1999; Label: Spitfire	—	—	—	—	—	—	48	—	—	—	—	—	
First Strike Still Deadly	Released: October 24, 2001; Label: Spitfire	—	—	—	—	—	—	—	—	—	—	—	—	
The Formation of Damnation	Released: April 29, 2008; Label: Nuclear Blast	59	—	23	—	12	95	15	42	47	27	33	122	US: 84,000+; WW:300,000+
Dark Roots of Earth	Released: July 27, 2012; Label: Nuclear Blast	12	—	21	12	4	46	4	56	32	8	10	57	
Brotherhood of the Snake	Released: October 28, 2016; Label: Nuclear Blast	20	24	23	24	18	87	11	42	74	43	16	43	
Titans of Creation	Released: April 3, 2020; Label: Nuclear Blast	96	30	25	—	6	138	3	29	—	—	7	—	
Para Bellum	Released: October 10, 2025; Label: Nuclear Blast	—	32	8	—	27	—	10	29	39	56	7	12	
"—" denotes a release that did not chart.														

== Live albums ==
Title	Album details	Peak chart positions		Sales
Title	Album details	GER	FRA	Sales
Live at Eindhoven (EP)	Released: 1987; Label: Atlantic/Megaforce	62	—	
Return to the Apocalyptic City (EP)	Released: 1993; Label: Atlantic	—	—	
Live at the Fillmore	Released: 1995; Label: Burnt Offerings	—	—	US: 32,592+
Live in London	Released: 2005; Label: Spitfire	—	—	
Live at Eindhoven '87	Released: April 14, 2009; Label: Nuclear Blast	—	—	
Dark Roots of Thrash	Released: October 29, 2013; Label: Nuclear Blast	52	168	
Live at Dynamo Open Air 1997	Released: May 24, 2019; Label: DYNAMO CONCERTS, F.R.E.T. Music	—	—	
"—" denotes a release that did not chart.

== Compilation albums ==
Title	Album details
The Best of Testament	Released: 1996; Label: Atlantic
Signs of Chaos	Released: 1997; Label: Mayhem/Fierce
The Very Best of Testament	Released: 2001; Label: Rhino
Days of Darkness	Released: 2004; Label: Spitfire
The Spitfire Collection	Released: 2007; Label: Spitfire

== Singles ==
Song	Year	Peak chart positions	Album
Song	Year	US Main.	Album
"Over the Wall"	1987	—	The Legacy
"Trial by Fire"	1988	—	The New Order
"Practice What You Preach"	1989	—	Practice What You Preach
"Greenhouse Effect"	1990	—	Practice What You Preach
"Souls of Black"	1990	—	Souls of Black
"The Legacy"	1990	—	Souls of Black
"Electric Crown"	1992	—	The Ritual
"Return to Serenity"	1992	22	The Ritual
"Low"	1994	—	Low
"Dog Faced Gods"	1994	—	Low
"True American Hate"	2012	—	Dark Roots of Earth
"Native Blood"	2012	—	Dark Roots of Earth
"The Pale King"	2016	—	Brotherhood of the Snake
"Night of the Witch"	2020	—	Titans of Creation
"Curse Of Osiris"	2022	—	Titans of Creation
"WWIII"	2023	—	Titans of Creation
"—" denotes a release that did not chart.

== Music videos ==
- "Over the Wall" (1987)
- "Trial By Fire" (1988)
- "Nobody's Fault" (1988)
- "Practice What You Preach" (1989)
- "Greenhouse Effect" (1990)
- "The Ballad" (1990)
- "Souls of Black" (1990)
- "The Legacy" (1990)
- "Electric Crown" (1992)
- "Return to Serenity" (1992)
- "Low" (1994)
- "More Than Meets the Eye" (2008)
- "Native Blood" (2012)
- "The Pale King" (2016)
- "Children of the Next Level" (2020)
- "Curse of Osiris" (2022)
- "WWIII" (2022)
- "Infanticide A.I." (2025)
- "Shadow People" (2025)
- "High Noon" (2025)

== Videos ==
Title	Video details	Peak chart positions	
Title	Video details	SWE	SWI
Seen Between the Lines	Released: June 25, 1991; Label: Atlantic; Format: VHS	—	—
Live in London	Released: November 1, 2005; Label: Spitfire; Format: DVD	—	—
Dark Roots of Thrash	Released: October 15, 2013; Label: Nuclear Blast; Format: DVD	7	9
"—" denotes a release that did not chart.
