= Live in London (Testament album) =

Live album by Testament
- Released: November 1, 2005
- Recorded: May 8, 2005
- Venue: Koko, London, England
- Genre: Thrash metal
- Length: 66:07
- Label: Spitfire

Testament chronology
Days of Darkness (2004)	Live in London (2005)	The Spitfire Collection (2007)

Professional ratings
Review scores
Source	Rating
AllMusic	3.5/5 stars
Stylus Magazine	B−

Live in London is a live album by American thrash metal band Testament, released on CD and DVD on November 1, 2005. It features the original Testament line up of Chuck Billy, Greg Christian, Louie Clemente, Eric Peterson, and Alex Skolnick, although John Tempesta played drums from the beginning of the show up to "Trial by Fire"; he was then replaced by original drummer Clemente for the remainder of the show. This was the third show of the 10 Days in May Tour. Backstage footage is included from the Innsbruck, Austria date on May 12, 2005, among others.

The DVD release features three audio mixes as well as a short interview with the band members.

== Track listing ==
No.	Title	Studio album	Length
1.	"The Preacher"	The New Order	4:10
2.	"The New Order"	The New Order	4:39
3.	"The Haunting"	The Legacy	4:27
4.	"Electric Crown"	The Ritual	5:40
5.	"Sins of Omission"	Practice What You Preach	5:24
6.	"Souls of Black"	Souls of Black	3:59
7.	"Into the Pit"	The New Order	3:06
8.	"Trial by Fire"	The New Order	5:17
9.	"Practice What You Preach"	Practice What You Preach	5:27
10.	"Let Go of My World"	The Ritual	3:41
11.	"The Legacy"	Souls of Black	5:29
12.	"Over the Wall"	The Legacy	4:52
13.	"Raging Waters"	The Legacy	4:41
14.	"Disciples of the Watch"	The New Order	5:15
Total length:			66:07

== Personnel ==
- Chuck Billy - lead vocals
- Alex Skolnick - lead guitar, backing vocals
- Eric Peterson - rhythm guitar, backing vocals
- Greg Christian - bass, backing vocals
- John Tempesta: drums (tracks 1–8)
- Louie Clemente: drums (tracks 9–14)
- Andy Sneap: mixing
