= The Spitfire Collection =

Compilation album by Testament
- Released: February 27, 2007
- Genre: Thrash metal; death metal
- Length: 55:50
- Label: Spitfire

Testament chronology
Live in London (2005)	The Spitfire Collection (2007)	The Formation of Damnation (2008)

Professional ratings
Review scores
Source	Rating
About.com	3.5/5 stars
Allmusic	3.5/5 stars
Exclaim!	(favorable)

The Spitfire Collection is a compilation album released in 2007 by Spitfire Records. It consists of tracks from the Spitfire-era Testament titles Live at the Fillmore (actually re-released by Spitfire), Demonic (also a re-release by Spitfire), The Gathering, First Strike Still Deadly, and Live in London.

Of note is the number of musicians present on this compilation; there are five different drummers (Louie Clemente, Jon Dette, Gene Hoglan, Dave Lombardo, John Tempesta), three different bassists (Greg Christian, Steve Di Giorgio, Derrick Ramirez), and four different guitarists (Glen Alvelais, James Murphy, Eric Peterson, Alex Skolnick), though Peterson appears on all tracks.

Chuck Billy provides vocals on all tracks, but there is one guest vocalist: Steve Souza, who sang the last two tracks on the First Strike Still Deadly release.

== Track listing ==
1. The New Order (Live)
2. Souls of Black (Live)
3. Practice What You Preach (Live)
4. Hatreds Rise
5. The Burning Times
6. John Doe
7. Careful What You Wish For
8. Down for Life
9. Riding the Snake
10. Over the Wall
11. The Preacher
12. Into the Pit
13. Trial by Fire (Live)
14. Disciples of the Watch (Live)
