= Clash of the Titans (tour) =

1990–91 heavy metal concert tour

- Tour by Megadeth, Slayer, Testament, Suicidal Tendencies, Anthrax, Alice in Chains
- Promotional poster for the Italian shows
- Location: Europe; North America
- Associated album: Rust in Peace; Seasons in the Abyss; Souls of Black; Lights...Camera...Revolution! Persistence of Time; Facelift
- Start date: September 22, 1990
- End date: July 14, 1991
- Legs: 2
- No. of shows: 67
Megadeth tour chronology
So Far, So Good... So What! Tour (1987–1988)	Clash of the Titans (1990–1991)	Rust in Peace/Oxidation of the Nations Tour (1990–1991)
Slayer tour chronology
World Sacrifice Tour (1988–1989)	Clash of the Titans (1990–1991)	Touring the Abyss (1990–1991)
Testament tour chronology
Practice What You Preach Tour (1989–1990)	Clash of the Titans (1990)	Souls of Black Tour (1990–1991)
Suicidal Tendencies tour chronology
Controlled by Hatred/Feel Like Shit...Déjà Vu Tour (1989)	Clash of the Titans (1990)	Lights...Camera...Revolution! Tour (1990–1991)
Anthrax tour chronology
State of Euphoria Tour (1988–1989)	Clash of the Titans (1991)	Persistence of Time Tour (1990–1991)
Alice in Chains tour chronology
Facelift Tour (1990–1991)	Clash of the Titans (1991)	SAP Tour (1992)

Clash of the Titans was a concert tour co-headlined by American thrash metal bands Megadeth and Slayer, which took place in September and October 1990 and again from May to July 1991. Launched in support of their respective albums Rust in Peace and Seasons in the Abyss, the tour had two legs, first in Europe (supported by Testament and Suicidal Tendencies) and second in North America (tri-headlined by Megadeth, Slayer and Anthrax and supported by Alice in Chains). Clash of the Titans is considered one of the most successful tours in heavy metal history, and has also been credited for bridging the gap between the popularity of thrash metal and rise of the alternative rock and grunge scene.

== History ==
=== Itinerary ===
The tour began in the fall of 1990 with a three-week European leg featuring Megadeth, Slayer, Testament and Suicidal Tendencies, promoting their then-current albums Rust in Peace, Seasons in the Abyss, Souls of Black and Lights...Camera...Revolution! respectively.

A second leg in 1991 in North America had a slightly different lineup: Megadeth, Slayer and Anthrax headlined, and Alice in Chains supported; while Megadeth and Slayer were still promoting their respective albums Rust in Peace and Seasons in the Abyss, Anthrax was supporting their fifth studio album Persistence of Time and Alice in Chains was touring behind their debut album Facelift. About the tour, Anthrax guitarist Scott Ian recalled, "We didn't start making any money until 1991, on the Clash of the Titans tour in the States – not even a dime. I got home from that tour to receive a cheque for a sizeable amount and called my accountant, saying, 'There must be a mistake.' We were of Iron Maiden's style of mindset, where we had to have these huge stage sets, and everything went straight back into the band."

=== Declined invitations and booking conflicts ===
Before the lineup of the North American leg of the Clash of the Titans tour was finalized, several metal bands were approached with an offer to appear on the tour as either a co-headlining or supporting act:

- Originally, Death Angel was supposed to be the opening act of the tour, but a near-fatal tour bus accident prevented them from joining.
- According to Max Cavalera, Sepultura was invited to replace Death Angel on the tour but got "kicked out" of the bill, prompting the band to headline a "revenge tour" called New Titans on the Bloc which featured Sacred Reich, Napalm Death and Sick of It All.
- Exodus was offered to participate in the tour, but due to financial issues, they were forced to rescind and were replaced by Anthrax.
- Testament was reportedly invited back on the North American tour, but withdrew as they had decided to take a break from touring in order to work on their next album The Ritual.
- Other bands—including Kreator, Vio-lence, Obituary and a then-newly successful Pantera—were also reportedly offered an opening slot but all declined.

==== Absence of Metallica ====
Metallica was the only band from the "Big Four" of thrash metal that did not take part in the Clash of the Titans tour. Slayer guitarist Kerry King told Guitar World that, "There might have even been talk of a 'Big Four' tour back then, but we probably couldn't get Metallica onboard. But we had three pieces of it, and that was all the management and promoters needed." The members of Slayer, Megadeth and Anthrax have indicated that one of the reasons Metallica was not part of the Clash of the Titans tour was due to their ascension to popularity, specifically with their self-titled "black album", which was not released until five weeks after the tour's conclusion. King has been quoted as saying, "I knew Metallica wouldn't be a part of it 'cause they didn't need us." Metallica, Megadeth, Slayer and Anthrax all eventually played together in 2010–2011 for a series of "Big Four" shows.

=== Spin-offs ===
The Clash of the Titans tour has spawned several spin-off tours. Three-fifths of the European lineup (Megadeth, Slayer and Testament) were reunited on the American Carnage Tour that took place from July to early September 2010. This was followed shortly by a second leg of the tour that featured three-fourths of the North American lineup of the Clash of the Titans tour: Megadeth, Slayer and Anthrax.

A similarly titled tour Klash of the Titans took place during the spring of 2023, with Kreator as one of the co-headliners to all of them. The first leg took place in Latin America and featured Kreator and Testament, followed shortly by a North American leg that was co-headlined by Kreator and Sepultura and included support from Death Angel and Spiritworld. A second North American leg of the Klash of the Titans tour took place in the fall of 2024, which was co-headlined by Kreator and Testament and supported by Possessed.

=== Possible revival ===
On December 9, 2017, Ultimate-Guitar.com reported that a rebooted Clash of the Titans tour featuring Megadeth, Slayer, Testament and Sepultura was in the works, and scheduled to take place in 2018 or 2019 in support of new albums from these four bands. More speculation about a tour similar to Clash of the Titans was renewed in January 2018, when Megadeth frontman Dave Mustaine mentioned a potential tour featuring Exodus and three of the "Big Four" (Megadeth, Slayer and Anthrax); a month later, Mustaine tweeted another potential tour similar to Clash of the Titans, titled "The New Big 4", featuring Megadeth, Anthrax, Exodus and Testament.

When Slayer announced its farewell tour in January 2018, it was suggested that the recently rumored Clash of the Titans tour (also featuring Megadeth, Sepultura and Testament) would take place as part of the aforementioned tour. Although Mustaine cryptically denied that this tour was in the works, he stated in a June 2018 interview with Rock Talk With Mitch Lafon that, "I hope that Megadeth and Slayer get to go one more round somewhere. I think it would be great, especially if it was a 'Big Four' show, but that's entirely up to them. And if it doesn't happen, we've had our share of Slayer and Megadeth shows, and I'll always appreciate those times together." Testament frontman Chuck Billy also commented on the tour rumors, referring to Slayer's farewell tour, "I doubt it, this is Slayer's last tour so this is it. There will be no more Slayer tours."

When asked in August 2018 by CBS San Francisco about the possibility of a revival of the Clash of the Titans tour with Slayer and Megadeth, Anthrax bassist Frank Bello stated, "I wouldn't say it's under wraps because I don't know about it. But I would absolutely love for the Big 4 thing to happen again. That would be the right thing to do for everybody. I would love that. I mean, as far as Slayer goes, I'm sure they're going to do more shows next year, but I don't know if we'll be on them, because we do have our album to write. It's all about scheduling and agents and all that. But we'd be open to any of that, specifically the Big 4. I think all four bands that were involved with the Big 4 would love to do it again. But that's totally up to Metallica."

In August 2019, the website Metal Addicts reported that a 30th anniversary edition of the Clash of the Titans tour was rumored to be taking place in 2020 and would feature a different lineup, with Megadeth and Testament likely to be included, but added that Slayer was not expected to be on the bill due to their farewell tour, which ended in November 2019. When asked a month later by The Metal Voice what the odds were for the revival of the Clash of the Titans tour and their European tour with Testament and Exodus—The Bay Strikes Back, Death Angel frontman Mark Osegueda commented: "The revival of the Clash of the Titans one, that's of course out of our hand. I've seen, some rumors floating around everywhere of course, we've not been approached so I could not tell you that, you know, I've heard anything. We've not been approached as a band as far as the Bay Strikes Back to tour that's happening in February–March in Europe."

== Tour dates ==
Date	City	Country	Venue
Europe
September 22, 1990	Genk	Belgium	Limburghal
September 23, 1990	Bern	Switzerland	Festhalle
September 24, 1990	Florence	Italy	Firenze Palasport
September 25, 1990	Milan	Italy	Palatrussardi
September 27, 1990	Barcelona	Spain	Velòdrom d'Horta
September 28, 1990	San Sebastián	Spain	Velodromo de Anoeta
September 30, 1990	Leiden	Netherlands	Groenoordhallen
October 2, 1990	Paris	France	Le Zénith
October 3, 1990	Stuttgart	Germany	Hanns-Martin-Schleyer-Halle
October 4, 1990	Mainz	Germany	Rheingoldhalle
October 5, 1990	Munich	Germany	Rudi-Sedlmayer-Halle
October 6, 1990	Düsseldorf	Germany	Philips Halle
October 7, 1990	Bremen	Germany	Stadthalle Bremen
October 9, 1990	Stockholm	Sweden	Solnahallen
October 10, 1990	Copenhagen	Denmark	K.B. Hallen
October 12, 1990	Edinburgh	Scotland	Exhibition and Trade Centre
October 13, 1990	Birmingham	England	National Exhibition Centre
October 14, 1990	London	England	Wembley Arena
North America
May 16, 1991	Dallas	United States	Starplex Amphitheatre
May 17, 1991	Lubbock	United States	Lubbock Municipal Coliseum
May 18, 1991	San Antonio	United States	Sunken Gardens Amphitheater
May 19, 1991	Houston	United States	The Summit
May 21, 1991	El Paso	United States	El Paso County Coliseum
May 22, 1991	Albuquerque	United States	Tingley Coliseum
May 23, 1991	Phoenix	United States	Arizona Veterans Memorial Coliseum
May 24, 1991	San Diego	United States	San Diego Sports Arena
May 25, 1991	Costa Mesa	United States	Pacific Amphitheatre
May 26, 1991	Daly City	United States	Cow Palace
May 27, 1991	Sacramento	United States	ARCO Arena
May 29, 1991	Portland	United States	Memorial Coliseum
May 30, 1991	Seattle	United States	Mercer Arena
May 31, 1991	Spokane	United States	Spokane Coliseum
June 1, 1991	Vancouver	Canada	Pacific Coliseum
June 3, 1991	Salt Lake City	United States	Bonneville Raceway
June 5, 1991	Morrison	United States	Red Rocks Amphitheatre
June 6, 1991	Omaha	United States	Omaha Civic Auditorium
June 7, 1991	Bonner Springs	United States	Sandstone Amphitheater
June 8, 1991	Cedar Rapids	United States	Five Seasons Center
June 9, 1991	Forest Lake	United States	Trout Aire Amphitheatre
June 11, 1991	Springfield	United States	Prairie Capital Convention Center
June 12, 1991	Louisville	United States	Louisville Gardens
June 14, 1991	Tinley Park	United States	First Midwest Bank Amphitheatre
June 15, 1991	East Troy	United States	Alpine Valley Music Theatre
June 16, 1991	Columbus	United States	Battelle Hall
June 18, 1991	Noblesville	United States	Deer Creek Music Center
June 20, 1991	Richfield	United States	Richfield Coliseum
June 21, 1991	Toronto	Canada	Exhibition Stadium
June 22, 1991	Clarkston	United States	Pine Knob Music Theatre
June 23, 1991	Mears	United States	Val du Lakes Amphitheatre
June 25, 1991	Burgettstown	United States	Star Lake Amphitheatre
June 26, 1991	Corfu	United States	Darien Lake Performing Arts Center
June 27, 1991	Middletown	United States	Orange County Fair Speedway
June 28, 1991	New York City	United States	Madison Square Garden
June 29, 1991	Philadelphia	United States	Wachovia Spectrum
June 30, 1991	Baltimore	United States	1st Mariner Arena
July 1, 1991	Hampton	United States	Hampton Coliseum
July 3, 1991	Hershey	United States	Hersheypark Stadium
July 4, 1991	Weedsport	United States	Cayuga County Speedway
July 5, 1991	Portland	United States	Cumberland County Civic Center
July 6, 1991	Mansfield	United States	Great Woods
July 7, 1991	Bristol	United States	Lake Compounce
July 9, 1991	Fayetteville	United States	Cumberland County Crown Coliseum
July 10, 1991	Greenville	United States	Greenville Memorial Auditorium
July 11, 1991	Charleston	United States	King Street Palace
July 12, 1991	Atlanta	United States	Omni Coliseum
July 13, 1991	Lakeland	United States	Lakeland Civic Center
July 14, 1991	Miami	United States	Miami Arena

=== Cancellations ===
Date	City	Country	Venue
June 17, 1991	Cincinnati	United States	Riverbend Music Center

== Setlist ==
Megadeth Setlist 1990

1. "Rattlehead"
2. "Wake Up Dead"
3. "Hangar 18"
4. "Hook in Mouth"
5. "Skull Beneath the Skin"
6. "The Conjuring"
7. "In My Darkest Hour"
8. "Devil's Island
9. "My Last Words"
10. "Peace Sells"
11. "Holy Wars... The Punishment Due"
12. "Good Mourning/Black Friday"
13. "Liar"
14. "Anarchy in the U.K." (Sex Pistols cover)

Megadeth Setlist 1991

1. "Wake Up Dead"
2. "Hook In Mouth"
3. "Hangar 18"
4. "The Conjuring"
5. "In My Darkest Hour"
6. "Dawn Patrol"
7. "Tornado of Souls"
8. "Holy Wars... The Punishment Due"
9. "Peace Sells"
10. "Anarchy in the U.K." (Sex Pistols cover)

Slayer Setlist 1990

1. "Raining Blood"
2. "Black Magic"
3. "War Ensemble"
4. "Postmortem"
5. "Blood Red"
6. "Die by the Sword"
7. "Dead Skin Mask"
8. "Altar of Sacrifice"
9. "Jesus Saves"
10. "At Dawn They Sleep"
11. "Spirit in Black"
12. "Mandatory Suicide"
13. "Live Undead"
14. "South of Heaven"
15. "Angel of Death"

Slayer Setlist 1991

1. "Hell Awaits"
2. "The Antichrist"
3. "War Ensemble"
4. "South of Heaven"
5. "Raining Blood"
6. "Altar of Sacrifice"
7. "Jesus Saves"
8. "Dead Skin Mask"
9. "Seasons in the Abyss"
10. "Mandatory Suicide"
11. "Angel of Death"

Anthrax Setlist

1. "Efilnikufesin (N.F.L.)"
2. "Got the Time" (Joe Jackson cover)
3. "Caught in a Mosh"
4. "Keep It in the Family"
5. "Indians"
6. "Antisocial" (Trust cover)

Encore:

7. "I'm the Man"
8. "Won't Get Fooled Again" / "I Am the Law"

== Personnel ==
Megadeth

- Dave Mustaine – guitars, vocals
- Marty Friedman – guitars
- David Ellefson – bass
- Nick Menza – drums

Slayer

- Tom Araya – bass, vocals
- Kerry King – guitars
- Jeff Hanneman – guitars
- Dave Lombardo – drums

Testament

- Chuck Billy – vocals
- Alex Skolnick – lead guitar
- Eric Peterson – rhythm guitar
- Greg Christian – bass
- Louie Clemente – drums

Suicidal Tendencies

- Mike Muir – vocals
- Rocky George – lead guitar
- Mike Clark – rhythm guitar
- Robert Trujillo – bass
- R. J. Herrera – drums

Anthrax

- Joey Belladonna – lead vocals
- Dan Spitz – lead guitar
- Scott Ian – rhythm guitar
- Frank Bello – bass
- Charlie Benante – drums

Alice in Chains

- Layne Staley – vocals
- Jerry Cantrell – guitars
- Mike Starr – bass
- Sean Kinney – drums
