= Dark Roots of Thrash =

Live album by Testament
- Released: October 22, 2013
- Recorded: February 15, 2013
- Venue: The Paramount, Huntington, New York
- Genre: Thrash metal
- Length: 99:25
- Label: Nuclear Blast

Testament chronology
Dark Roots of Earth (2012)	Dark Roots of Thrash (2013)	Brotherhood of the Snake (2016)

Singles from Dark Roots of Thrash
- 1. "Rise Up" Released: September 12, 2013

Professional ratings
Review scores
Source	Rating
About.com	4/5 stars
Blabbermouth.net	9/10
Exclaim!	8/10
Jukebox:Metal	3/5 stars

Dark Roots of Thrash is a double-disc live album and DVD by American thrash metal band Testament, released on October 15, 2013 through Nuclear Blast. The performance was recorded at The Paramount Theatre in Huntington, New York on February 15, 2013. It was released on October 22, 2013 in Europe and on October 29, 2013 in the United States.

== Track listing ==
CD track listing

Disc one
No.	Title	Length
1.	"Intro"	2:37
2.	"Rise Up"	4:18
3.	"More Than Meets the Eye"	4:25
4.	"Burnt Offerings"	6:36
5.	"Native Blood"	5:14
6.	"True American Hate"	6:22
7.	"Dark Roots of Earth"	5:41
8.	"Into the Pit"	3:25
9.	"Practice What You Preach"	5:23
Total length:		44:01

Disc two
No.	Title	Length
1.	"Riding the Snake"	4:27
2.	"Eyes of Wrath"	5:49
3.	"Trial by Fire"	4:40
4.	"The Haunting"	4:45
5.	"The New Order"	5:04
6.	"D.N.R. (Do Not Resuscitate)"	4:23
7.	"Three Days in Darkness"	7:13
8.	"The Formation of Damnation"	6:47
9.	"Over the Wall"	4:47
10.	"Disciples of the Watch"	7:29
Total length:		55:24

DVD extras

- Backstage Footage
- "Native Blood" (video clip)

== Personnel ==
Testament

- Chuck Billy – lead vocals
- Alex Skolnick – guitars, backing vocals
- Eric Peterson – guitars, backing vocals
- Greg Christian – bass, backing vocals
- Gene Hoglan – drums

Additional personnel

- Tommy Jones – director
- Juan Urteaga – mixing
- Steve Lagudi – recording
- Get Hammered Productions – production

== Charts ==
Chart (2013)	Peak position
Belgian Albums (Ultratop Flanders)	164
Belgian Albums (Ultratop Wallonia)	151
French Albums (SNEP)	168
German Albums (Offizielle Top 100)	52
Spanish Albums (Promusicae)	80
UK Rock & Metal Albums (OCC)	33
