= Live at Eindhoven =

1987 live album by Testament

Live album by Testament
- Released: 1987
- Recorded: June 8, 1987
- Genre: Thrash metal
- Length: 25:47
- Label: Atlantic/Megaforce
- Producer: Alex Perialas

Testament chronology
The Legacy (1987)	Live at Eindhoven (1987)	The New Order (1988)

Live at Eindhoven is a live EP by American thrash metal band Testament. It was released in 1987 via Megaforce Records for Europe in 1987 and the US in 1990. It was recorded at the Dynamo Open Air Festival in Eindhoven, Netherlands on June 8, 1987.

A remastered version of the album titled Live at Eindhoven '87 was released on April 14, 2009.

Professional ratings
Review scores
Source	Rating
AllMusic	link

== Track listing ==
No.	Title	Lyrics	Music	Length
1.	"Over the Wall"	Souza	Peterson, Skolnick, Christian	5:38
2.	"Burnt Offerings"	Souza, Peterson	Skolnick, Peterson	4:52
3.	"Do or Die"	Skolnick, Peterson, Billy	Skolnick, Peterson, Clemente	5:24
4.	"Apocalyptic City"	Skolnick, Peterson	Skolnick, Peterson	5:54
5.	"Reign of Terror"	Ramirez, Peterson	Ramirez, Peterson	4:31
Total length:				26:19

== Credits ==
- Chuck Billy – lead vocals
- Alex Skolnick – lead guitar, backing vocals
- Eric Peterson – rhythm guitar, backing vocals
- Greg Christian – bass, backing vocals
- Louie Clemente – drums

== Live at Eindhoven '87 ==
Live at Eindhoven '87

Live album by Testament
- Released: April 14, 2009
- Recorded: June 8, 1987
- Genre: Thrash metal
- Length: 45:46
- Label: Prosthetic

Testament chronology
The Formation of Damnation (2008)	Live at Eindhoven '87 (2009)	Dark Roots of Earth (2012)

Live at Eindhoven '87 is a remastered reissue of the Live at Eindhoven EP, released on April 14, 2009 through Prosthetic Records. It now features the group's complete 1987 performance at that year's Dynamo Open Air Festival in Eindhoven, as well as a newly designed cover artwork.

=== Track listing ===
No.	Title	Lyrics	Music	Length
1.	"Disciples of the Watch"	Billy	Skolnick, Peterson	4:48
2.	"The Haunting"	Souza, Peterson	Skolnick, Peterson	4:49
3.	"Apocalyptic City"	Skolnick, Peterson	Skolnick, Peterson	6:22
4.	"First Strike Is Deadly"	Souza, Christian	Peterson, Skolnick	3:52
5.	"Burnt Offerings"	Souza, Peterson	Skolnick, Peterson	5:08
6.	"Alex Skolnick Guitar Solo"		Skolnick	1:52
7.	"Over the Wall"	Souza	Peterson, Skolnick, Christian	4:37
8.	"Do or Die"	Skolnick, Peterson, Billy	Skolnick, Peterson, Clemente	5:23
9.	"Curse of the Legion of Death (C.O.T.L.O.D.)"	Ramirez, Peterson	Ramirez, Peterson	3:32
10.	"Reign of Terror"	Ramirez, Peterson	Ramirez, Peterson	5:18
Total length:				45:46

Professional ratings
Review scores
Source	Rating
Allmusic	link

=== Credits ===
- Chuck Billy – lead vocals
- Alex Skolnick – lead guitar, backing vocals
- Eric Peterson – rhythm guitar, backing vocals
- Greg Christian – bass, backing vocals
- Louie Clemente – drums
