= Return to the Apocalyptic City =

EP by Testament
- Released: 1993
- Genre: Thrash metal
- Length: 30:06
- Label: Atlantic
- Producer: Alex Perialas

Testament chronology
The Ritual (1992)	Return to the Apocalyptic City (1993)	Low (1994)

Return to the Apocalyptic City is a live EP by American thrash metal band Testament, released in 1993. All tracks were recorded at the Hollywood Palladium, except for the last two; "Reign of Terror" was recorded during The New Order sessions in 1987–1988, but did not appear on that album; it did, however, surface as a B-side to the album's sole single "Trial by Fire". The closing track, "Return to Serenity", is a single edited version of the song, which appears on The Ritual.

Professional ratings
Review scores
Source	Rating
AllMusic	2/5 stars
Collector's Guide to Heavy Metal	7/10

== Track listing ==
1. "Over the Wall" (Live) (Souza, Peterson, Skolnick, Christian) - 5:28
2. "So Many Lies" (Live) (Billy, Del James, Peterson, Skolnick) - 6:13
3. "The Haunting" (Live) (Souza, Peterson, Skolnick, Peterson) - 4:28
4. "Disciples of the Watch" (Live) (Billy, Skolnick, Peterson) - 4:38
5. "Reign of Terror" (Ramirez, Peterson) - 4:48
6. "Return to Serenity" (Edit) (Billy, James, Peterson) - 4:30

== Credits ==
- Chuck Billy - lead vocals
- Glen Alvelais - lead guitar (tracks 1–4)
- Alex Skolnick - lead guitar, backing vocals (tracks 5–6)
- Eric Peterson - rhythm guitar, backing vocals
- Greg Christian - bass, backing vocals
- Paul Bostaph - drums (tracks 1–4)
- Louie Clemente - drums (tracks 5–6)
