= Titans of Creation =

Studio album by Testament
- Released: April 3, 2020
- Recorded: 2019
- Studios: Trident Studios, Pacheco, California
- Genre: Thrash metal
- Length: 58:34
- Label: Nuclear Blast
- Producers: Chuck Billy; Eric Peterson; Juan Urteaga

Testament chronology
Brotherhood of the Snake (2016)	Titans of Creation (2020)	Para Bellum (2025)

Singles from Titans of Creation
- 1. "Night of the Witch" Released: January 31, 2020; 2. "Children of the Next Level" Released: March 6, 2020

Titans of Creation is the thirteenth studio album by American thrash metal band Testament, released on April 3, 2020. It marked the first time since The Ritual (1992) that the band had recorded more than one album with the same lineup, though it would turn out to be their last to feature drummer Gene Hoglan, who left Testament for the second time in January 2022. It is also the band's first album to be co-produced by Juan Urteaga, who previously worked with Testament's two studio albums Dark Roots of Earth (2012) and Brotherhood of the Snake (2016). At 58:34 minutes long, Titans of Creation is Testament's longest album to date.

== Background, writing and recording ==
Testament's intention to follow-up Brotherhood of the Snake was first revealed by Chuck Billy in March 2017, who told Japan's Roppongi Rocks that the band had begun writing new material. Billy also expressed hope that the album would be released in 2018, stating, "We thought we'd have a record out after two years; it just ended up being four, because the process just... I don't know what happened, but it took forever. So this time, like, you know what? I don't wanna do that again. I told Eric exactly when we were done recording. I said, 'You know what? It's a great record now, but I don't wanna go through what I had to go through to do this again. So why don't we start writing now?' So we decided that when we're not on the road, let's get together and just jam and maybe come up and at least get to that point where we were with this record — a bunch of ideas and riffs and lyrics." In a December 2017 interview with Metal Messiah Radio, Billy stated that Testament would start working on their thirteenth studio album after they finish touring in support of Brotherhood of the Snake in August 2018, hoping not to repeat the four-year gaps between their last three albums. He explained, "If we can get a head start on riffs and ideas, and then hopefully after that, you know, really dig in to put out a record in 2019, sometime."

In a February 2018 interview with RockSverige, guitarist Eric Peterson said, "Our plan was to end in August 2018 and maybe get into the studio by the end of 2018 and put the record out in 2019. But, you know, Slayer's announced their farewell tour and they want us to be a part of it. I would imagine, if that stuff happens, then things will get pushed back a little bit, but the initial plan is to have it out in 2019. [We're] ready for summer to do all the A markets for festivals and stuff. This summer we're not doing a lot of festivals; we're actually talking about bowing out of a couple to make other things happen with the Slayer farewell thing." Billy stated in a May 2018 interview that opening for Slayer on their farewell tour would be "the final lap for [them] touring" in support of Brotherhood of the Snake, and added, "We want our focus, during this and after this, to dive back into the songwriting process. We want to release a new album in 2019, so we need to get started soon." A month later, Billy told Full Metal Jackie that, "the goal is to get in the studio hopefully by January and have a record out hopefully by April." He also told Metal Heads Forever Magazine that, "Me and Eric, we'll start really just creating and working, trying to get the next record out as soon as possible, because we have plans and hopes of setting a deadline on ourselves to have it out by summer 2019. We've got a lot of work ahead of us." Billy told Talking Metal podcast in August 2018 that the band would start work on the new album after their tour with Slayer, and added, "Our hopes and dreams would be to get in the studio by January and have an album out by the summer." He also said that they would work with Andy Sneap as the album's mixer.

In a January 2019 interview with Jimmy Kay of Canada's The Metal Voice, Billy confirmed that Testament had been writing songs for their thirteenth album, and added, "We should have it out hopefully by July. Hopefully we'll get into the studio by April. That's the goal." A month later, Billy announced on social media that work on the new album had started, and pre-production began in May. Drummer Gene Hoglan revealed in a June 2019 interview on the "Talk Toomey" podcast that the band had finished recording the album for a 2019 or early 2020 release. Peterson announced later that month that it would be released in January 2020. In an interview at a Metal Allegiance concert in Anaheim on January 16, 2020, Billy revealed that the then-still-untitled album would be released on April 3. It was later revealed that the album would be titled Titans of Creation.

== Release and promotion ==
The first albums first single "Night of the Which" was released on January 31, 2020. The second and final single "Children of the Next Level" was released on March 6, an official animated music video for the song was later released alongside the album on April 3. The album debuted at number 96 on the Billboard 200.

Testament originally began touring on the album alongside Exodus and Death Angel however this tour was quickly postponed due to the COVID-19 pandemic. The tour dubbed the The Bay Strikes Back tour officially continued on October of 7, 2021, and went till October 1, 2023 spanning five legs.

== Reception ==
Professional ratings
Aggregate scores
Source	Rating
Metacritic	83/100
Review scores
Source	Rating
AllMusic	4/5 stars
Blabbermouth.net	8/10
Exclaim!	8/10
KNAC	3.5/5
Metal Hammer	4/5 stars
Metal Storm	6.0/10
Rock Hard	8.5/10
Sputnikmusic	3.9/5

Titans of Creation received positive reviews from critics. Jason Roche of Blabbermouth.net gave the album a rating of eight out of ten and said, "While Testament has in the past shown to be capable of much more in terms of lyrics and songcraft, the fact that the band is using their power in 2020 to simply put out a killer thrash record full of songs about well-worn topics such as World War III, serial killers from a generation ago, and the Heaven's Gate suicide cult is comforting and very welcome." KNAC.com contributor Peter Atkinson, who rated Titans of Creation 3.5 out of five, called it "sort of kick in the ass we could all use right now. And the album most definitely kicks ass."

AllMusic writer James Christopher Monger gave the album four out of five stars, and stated that "The Bay Area thrash legends' 13th studio effort, Titans of Creation commences with the familiar sound of immaculate guitarmonies, blast furnace-forged double-kick drum, and taut, palm-muted riffage. Inspired by the mass suicide of the UFO religious cult Heaven's Gate, the blazing 'Children of the Next Level' may be straight out of the Testament playbook, but its potency is undeniable."

Metal Hammer added "Testament have never sounded heavier, nor more utterly committed to crushing everything in sight. And the highlights come thick and fast; Ishtars Gate takes bullish catchiness of the band’s Practice What You Preach era and pumps it full of steroids and mescaline; Symptoms is a haughty, mid-paced chug-tsunami, with Chuck Billy in multi-voice versatility mode."

=== Accolades ===
Publications' year-end list appearances for Titans of Creation
Critic/Publication	List	Rank	Ref
Consequence of Sound	Top 30 Metal/Hard Rock Albums of 2020	24	
Louder Sound	Top 50 Albums of 2020	21	
Loudwire	Top 70 Rock/Metal Albums of 2020	N/A	
Metal Hammer	The 50 Best Metal Albums of 2020	15	

== Track listing ==
No.	Title	Lyrics	Music	Length
1.	"Children of the Next Level"	Chuck Billy; Del James	Eric Peterson	6:13
2.	"WWIII"	Billy; James	Peterson	4:48
3.	"Dream Deceiver"	Billy; James	Peterson	4:58
4.	"Night of the Witch"	Billy; Peterson; James	Peterson	6:32
5.	"City of Angels"	Billy; James	Peterson	6:43
6.	"Ishtar's Gate"	Billy; James	Peterson	5:09
7.	"Symptoms"	Alex Skolnick	Skolnick	4:37
8.	"False Prophet"	Billy; Steve "Zetro" Souza	Peterson	4:54
9.	"The Healers"	Billy; James	Peterson	4:23
10.	"Code of Hammurabi"	Billy; Skolnick; James	Skolnick	4:52
11.	"Curse of Osiris"	Billy; James	Peterson	3:24
12.	"Catacombs"	Instrumental	Peterson	2:01
Total length:				58:34

Japanese edition bonus CD - Live in Tokyo (Live recording at Tsutaya O-East in Shibuya, Tokyo, Japan on February 20, 2017.)
No.	Title	Length
1.	"Brotherhood of the Snake"	4:26
2.	"Rise Up"	4:35
3.	"Disciples of the Watch"	4:26
4.	"The Pale King"	5:00
5.	"Practice What You Preach"	5:06
6.	"The New Order"	4:36
7.	"More Than Meets the Eye"	4:28
8.	"Dark Roots of Earth"	5:33
9.	"Stronghold"	4:14
10.	"Into the Pit"	3:21
11.	"Over the Wall"	5:18
12.	"D.N.R. (Do Not Resuscitate)"	4:19
13.	"3 Days in Darkness"	6:01
14.	"The Formation of Damnation"	8:00
15.	"Alone in the Dark"	7:45
Total length:		77:08

== Personnel ==
- Chuck Billy – lead vocals
- Alex Skolnick – guitars
- Eric Peterson – guitars, backing vocals
- Steve Di Giorgio – bass
- Gene Hoglan – drums

=== Additional personnel ===
- Lyle Livingston – keyboards on "Catacombs"
- Greg Goss – vocals
- Rigo Martin – vocals

=== Technicial personnel ===
- Chuck Billy – production
- Eric Peterson – production
- Juan Urteaga – co-production, recording
- Andy Sneap – mixing, mastering
- Eliran Kantor – artwork

== Charts ==
Chart performance for Titans of Creation
Chart (2020)	Peak position
Australian Albums (ARIA)	30
Austrian Albums (Ö3 Austria)	25
Belgian Albums (Ultratop Flanders)	175
Belgian Albums (Ultratop Wallonia)	147
Finnish Albums (Suomen virallinen lista)	6
French Albums (SNEP)	138
German Albums (Offizielle Top 100)	3
Hungarian Albums (MAHASZ)	13
Japanese Albums (Oricon)	29
Polish Albums (ZPAV)	7
Portuguese Albums (AFP)	36
Scottish Albums (Official Charts)	52
Swiss Albums (Schweizer Hitparade)	7
UK Independent Albums (Official Charts)	9
UK Rock & Metal Albums (Official Charts)	4
US Billboard 200	96
US Independent Albums (Billboard)	12
US Top Album Sales (Billboard)	8
US Top Hard Rock Albums (Billboard)	5
US Top Rock Albums (Billboard)	13
US Indie Store Album Sales (Billboard)	5
