= Dark Roots of Earth =

Studio album by Testament
- Released: July 27, 2012
- Recorded: June 2011 – February 2012
- Genre: Thrash metal
- Length: 50:49
- Label: Nuclear Blast
- Producer: Andy Sneap

Testament chronology
Live at Eindhoven '87 (2009)	Dark Roots of Earth (2012)	Dark Roots of Thrash (2013)

Singles from Dark Roots of Earth
- 1. "True American Hate" Released: 2012; 2. "Native Blood" Released: July 20, 2012

Dark Roots of Earth is the eleventh studio album by American thrash metal band Testament. It was released on July 27, 2012, in Europe, and four days later in North America by independent German record label Nuclear Blast Records. The album is available in three configurations, CD, CD/DVD and vinyl, with the latter two versions including four bonus tracks. The album was produced by Andy Sneap, who mixed and engineered the band's previous three studio releases, The Gathering (1999), First Strike Still Deadly (2001), and The Formation of Damnation (2008). The album artwork was created by Eliran Kantor. A music video was made for the track "Native Blood". Dark Roots of Earth entered the Billboard 200 at number 12, Testament's highest position ever.

This album saw a reunion with Gene Hoglan, who played drums on the band's 1997 album Demonic. During the recording, Hoglan filled in for Paul Bostaph who was unable to attend the recording sessions because of a "serious injury", although the latter left the band in December 2011. Chris Adler of Lamb of God provided drum tracks on the iTunes bonus version of "A Day in the Death". Dark Roots of Earth is also the last Testament album with bassist Greg Christian, who left the band for the second time in January 2014.

== Songs ==
"Native Blood" was released as a single from the album on July 20, 2012, both as a download and a limited edition 7" single. A video was made for the song as well. A Spanish version of "Native Blood" entitled "Sangre Nativa" was released on the "Native Blood" single. Previously, "True American Hate" was released as a free download.

"Native Blood" was described as being about Billy's Native American heritage. "True American Hate" was written about the prevalence of hatred, particularly anti-Americanism, in younger generations around the world, often perpetuated by their upbringing. Billy has described "Cold Embrace" as being about "a girl becoming a vampire and never being able to see the sun again." He added that the band hoped to pitch it for a Twilight movie. "Dark Roots of Earth" was described as being a metaphor about the band. "Rise Up" is about war.

== Release and promotion ==
The album’s first single "True American Hate" was released on June 27, 2012. The second single "Native Blood" was later released on July 20, and an official music video was released on the 30.

Dark Roots of Earth sold over 20,000 copies in the United States in its first week of release, and reached number twelve on the Billboard 200—Testament's highest U.S. chart position to date. This made it highest charting/selling first week sales in the history of Nuclear Blast USA at that point. The album also reached number one on the US Hard Rock, US Independent and US Top Rock charts. Internationally the album reached the top 50 in multiple countries and reached number one on the Hungarian Albums chart. By March 2013, Dark Roots of Earth sold around 60,000 copies in the U.S.

To promote the album, Testament embarked on a U.S. and Canadian tour co-headlining with Anthrax and openers Death Angel in fall 2012. The three bands had already been touring the U.S. together since fall 2011, with Anthrax supporting their 2011 album Worship Music.

In January and February 2013, following the dates with Anthrax and Death Angel, Testament embarked on a U.S. headlining tour with Overkill, Flotsam and Jetsam, and Australian band 4Arm.

== Critical reception ==
Professional ratings
Aggregate scores
Source	Rating
Metacritic	82/100
Review scores
Source	Rating
About.com	4.5/5 stars
Allmusic	4/5 stars
Blabbermouth.net	8.5/10
Exclaim!	favorable
Jukebox:Metal	5/5 stars
Revolver	4/5
Rock Hard	8.0/10

Dark Roots of Earth has received universal acclaim. Ryan Ogle of Blabbermouth.net awards the album eight-and-a-half stars out of ten and states, "This album is anything but a rehashing of former glories. The skilled interplay between Alex Skolnick and Eric Peterson, which features a wall-to-wall showcasing of intricate and harmonized runs, back-and-forth soloing, hooky riffs and metallic perfection, is at the centerpiece of this album. The duo displays everything that made them among the most formidable guitar teams on the late '80s / early '90s while placing everything into a modern context." Ogle also praises the music a "noticeably different vibe than its predecessor by leaning more towards their (now) classic American thrash roots", while he describes the album as a "2012 take on Testament's classic and pioneering sound."

Eduardo Rivadavia of AllMusic wrote "though the songs largely see Testament reaping nostalgia's rewards, the multifaceted "Throne of Thorns" reveals new sounds, ideas, and a willingness to experiment more aggressively in years to come. For now, Dark Roots of Earth improves upon 2008's comeback The Formation of Damnation and, in tandem with those rejuvenated live performances, promises a well-deserved second act for a band that so narrowly missed grasping the golden ring its first time around." Greg Pratt of Exclaim! added "Testament just don't make missteps (the album could be a couple songs shorter, but that's my biggest complaint), continuing to craft thrash that's mature, heavy and aggressive in all the best ways. Between this and the last Kreator release, it's been a great year for thrash."

The music video for "Native Blood" won best music video award at the 2012 American Indian Film Festival Awards.

== Track listing ==
No.	Title	Lyrics	Music	Length
1.	"Rise Up"	Chuck Billy	Eric Peterson	4:18
2.	"Native Blood"	Billy, Del James	Peterson	5:21
3.	"Dark Roots of Earth"	Billy, James, Peterson	Peterson, Skolnick	5:45
4.	"True American Hate"	Billy, Souza	Peterson, Skolnick	5:26
5.	"A Day in the Death"	Billy, Souza, Skolnick	Peterson, Skolnick	5:38
6.	"Cold Embrace"	Billy, James	Peterson, Skolnick	7:45
7.	"Man Kills Mankind"	Billy, James	Peterson	5:04
8.	"Throne of Thorns"	Billy, James	Peterson, Skolnick	7:06
9.	"Last Stand for Independence"	Billy, James	Peterson	4:42
Total length:				50:49

Japan edition bonus track
No.	Title	Lyrics	Music	Length
10.	"Practice What You Preach" (re-recording 2012)	Billy, Peterson, Skolnick	Billy, Skolnick, Peterson, Christian, Clemente	5:15
Total length:				56:05

CD/DVD and Vinyl bonus tracks
No.	Title	Lyrics	Music	Length
10.	"Dragon Attack" (Queen cover)	May	May	4:44
11.	"Animal Magnetism" (Scorpions cover)	Meine, Rarebell	Schenker	5:56
12.	"Powerslave" (Iron Maiden cover)	Dickinson	Dickinson	6:51
13.	"Throne of Thorns" (extended version)	Billy, James	Peterson, Skolnick	7:41
Total length:				76:02

iTunes bonus track
No.	Title	Lyrics	Music	Length
14.	"A Day in the Death" (featuring Chris Adler)	Billy, Skolnick, Souza	Peterson, Skolnick	5:41
Total length:				81:43

== Credits ==
Writing, performance and production credits are adapted from the album liner notes.

=== Personnel ===
Testament

- Chuck Billy – lead vocals
- Eric Peterson – guitars, backing vocals
- Alex Skolnick – guitars
- Greg Christian – bass
- Gene Hoglan – drums

Session musicians

- Chris Adler – drums on "A Day in the Death" (iTunes bonus track)

Production

- Andy Sneap – production, engineering, recording, mixing, mastering
- Juan Urteaga – additional recording
- Testament – production, mixing, mastering

Bonus cover tracks production

- Juan Urteaga – recording, mixing
- Nik Chinboukas – additional recording of "Dragon Attack"
- Paul Suarez – additional recording of "Animal Magnetism" and "Powerslave"
- Chuck Billy – mixing
- Eric Peterson – mixing

Artwork and design

- Eliran Kantor – cover art, booklet
- Eric Peterson – cover art concept
- Gino Carlini – photography

=== Studios ===
- Driftwood Studios, Oakland, California, U.S. – recording
- Backstage Studios, Derby, England – recording
- Trident Studios, Martinez, California, U.S. – additional recording, recording (bonus cover tracks)
- Spin Studios, New York City, U.S. – additional recording (bonus cover tracks)

== Charts ==
Chart (2012)	Peak position
Austrian Albums (Ö3 Austria)	21
Belgian Albums (Ultratop Flanders)	54
Belgian Albums (Ultratop Wallonia)	29
Canadian Albums (Billboard)	12
Danish Albums (Hitlisten)	29
Dutch Albums (Album Top 100)	32
Finnish Albums (Suomen virallinen lista)	4
French Albums (SNEP)	46
German Albums (Offizielle Top 100)	4
Hungarian Albums (MAHASZ)	1
Italian Albums (FIMI)	27
Japanese Albums (Oricon)	56
Norwegian Albums (VG-lista)	11
Polish Albums (ZPAV)	8
Scottish Albums (Official Charts)	39
South Korean Albums (Circle)	91
South Korean International Albums (Circle)	10
Swedish Albums (Sverigetopplistan)	8
Swiss Albums (Schweizer Hitparade)	10
UK Albums (Official Charts)	57
UK Independent Albums (Official Charts)	5
UK Rock & Metal Albums (Official Charts)	3
US Billboard 200	12
US Independent Albums (Billboard)	1
US Top Hard Rock Albums (Billboard)	1
US Top Rock Albums (Billboard)	1
US Indie Store Album Sales (Billboard)	2
