= Souls of Black =

Studio album by Testament
- Released: October 9, 1990
- Recorded: June 1990
- Studios: Fantasy Studios, Berkeley, California
- Genres: Thrash metal; heavy metal; progressive metal
- Length: 39:07
- Labels: Atlantic; Megaforce
- Producers: Michael Rosen, Testament

Testament chronology
Practice What You Preach (1989)	Souls of Black (1990)	The Ritual (1992)

Souls of Black is the fourth studio album by American thrash metal band Testament. It was released on October 9, 1990.

== Production and musical style ==
While Souls of Black saw Testament staying true to their thrash sound, it saw several changes in style to rather diverse styles of metal, continuing the melding of technical and progressive influences that began on its predecessor Practice What You Preach, and preceding the traditional heavy metal sound heard in its subsequent album, The Ritual. The songs on the album are musically re-worked and lyrically re-written songs that had been demoed in the late 1980s, but never officially released. Souls of Black sees Testament continuing in a vein similar to that of Practice What You Preach, with its lyrics dealing with society, politics, religion, suicide, megalomania and warfare. Like Practice What You Preach, this album was recorded at Fantasy Studios, but also marked the band's first album to be produced by a different producer, with Michael Rosen replacing Alex Perialas, who handled this role on the band's previous three albums.

One of the main reasons behind the making of Souls of Black was so that Testament could participate in the European Clash of the Titans tour with Megadeth, Slayer and Suicidal Tendencies, which began just prior to the album's release. Guitarist Eric Peterson explained to Guitar World magazine, "We kind of rushed out Souls of Black just to get on the bill, because we didn't want to miss the tour and our label said we had to have an album out. We had done some touring with Slayer that year, and we did shows with Megadeth two or three years prior to that." Along with Megadeth, they also opened for Judas Priest on their Painkiller tour in the United States.

== Reception and legacy ==
Professional ratings
Review scores
Source	Rating
AllMusic	2.5/5 stars
Collector's Guide to Heavy Metal	4/10
Entertainment Weekly	B+

Reviews for Souls of Black have generally been mixed. AllMusic's Alex Henderson awards it two-and-a-half stars out of five, saying "Testament sounds very much like it did on its three previous albums and is as heavy as ever", while he added that Souls of Black "isn't in a class with The New Order, but is nonetheless a welcome addition to Testament's generally rewarding catalog."

The album entered the Billboard 200 album charts on November 3, 1990, peaking at number 73 (Testament's highest chart position by this point) and remaining on the chart for eight weeks. Souls of Black is also seen as an influential guitar album, being ranked number nine on Guitar World magazine's top ten list of guitar albums of 1990.

Testament has rarely played any songs from Souls of Black live since at least 1991; out of the album's ten songs, "Face in the Sky", "Falling Fast", "Souls of Black", "Absence of Light", "Malpractice" and "The Legacy" were showcased during its accompanying tour. The title track is the only song from this album that Testament has performed live frequently, while "The Legacy" was last played in 2011 and the other four songs ("Beginning of the End", "Love to Hate", "One Man's Fate" and "Seven Days of May") have never been played live.

== Track listing ==
No.	Title	Lyrics	Music	Length
1.	"Beginning of the End" (Instrumental)		Eric Peterson	0:36
2.	"Face in the Sky"	Chuck Billy	Peterson, Alex Skolnick	3:53
3.	"Falling Fast"	Billy	Peterson, Louie Clemente	4:05
4.	"Souls of Black"	Billy	Peterson, Skolnick, Clemente	3:22
5.	"Absence of Light"	Billy, Skolnick	Peterson, Billy	3:55
6.	"Love to Hate"	Peterson, Clemente, Billy	Peterson, Skolnick	3:40
7.	"Malpractice"	Skolnick, Billy	Skolnick, Peterson	4:43
8.	"One Man's Fate"	Billy	Peterson, Clemente	4:49
9.	"The Legacy"	Skolnick, Billy, Peterson	Peterson, Clemente, Skolnick	5:30
10.	"Seven Days of May"	Skolnick, Billy	Peterson, Skolnick	4:41
Total length:				39:07

== In popular culture ==
A re-recorded version of the title track appeared on the 2008 video game Rock Band 2.

== Personnel ==
Testament

- Chuck – vocals
- Alex – lead guitar
- Eric – rhythm guitar
- Greg – bass
- Louie – drums

Additional musicians

- Mark Walters, Steve Quartarola and Bogdan Jablonski – additional backing vocals

Production

- Michael Rosen – producer, engineer
- Testament – producers
- Vincent Wojno – assistant engineer
- Tom Coyne – mastering at Hit Factory, New York City
- William Benson – front cover painting

== Charts ==
Chart (1990)	Peak position
Japanese Albums (Oricon)	70
UK Albums (Official Charts)	35
US Billboard 200	73
