= Without Warning (band) =

American progressive metal band

- Origin: New York City, United States
- Genre: Progressive metal
- Years active: 1988−1998
- Label: Heavencross
- Past members: Ted Burger; Jack Bielata; Vinnie Fontanetta; Graham Thomson; Steve Michael

Without Warning were an American progressive metal band from New York City, formed in 1987. The band was noted for their Christian themes and progressive sound.

== History ==
Without Warning released a 20-minute demo in 1992.

In 1993, one year after the release of their demo, they released their debut album. Making Time was released originally by Japanese metal label Zero Corporation. The album was originally recorded and mixed by guitarist Ted Burger and engineer Jeff Reidmiller in one week. The pre-release recordings caught the attention of several influential Japanese critics including Masa Itoh and Koh Sakai leading to the decision to spend additional time and bringing in Eddie Kramer to remix the record. Making Time spawned several hit songs including "Taste of Sin" which reached No. 19 on Japan's Burrn! magazine charts. The song "Making Time" also became the theme song for Koh Sakai's Power Rock Today radio show and remained there for several years. Making Time was listed as the No. 19 album of the year for 1993 on Japan's Burrn! magazine charts.

Two years after the release of their debut album, they released their second album Believe. Believe was produced by Alex Perialas. Guitarist Ted Burger was featured in Japan's Young Guitar magazine and was voted the fourth-best guitarist in MVP's readers poll.

In 1998, they released their third and final album, Step Beyond.

Following the release of the album in 1998, in 1999 the band broke up.

Making Time was reissued in 2004 under the independent label Heavencross Records in Europe.

== Discography ==
=== Studio albums ===
- Making Time (1993)
- Believe (1995)
- Step Beyond (1998)

=== Demo ===
- Demo (1992)

== Band members ==
- Ted Burger − guitar (1991−1999)
- Jack Bielata − vocals (1991−1999)
- Vinnie Fontanetta − keyboards (1991−1999)
- Graham Thomson − bass (1991−1999)
- Steve Michael − drums (1991−1999)
