= The Formation of Damnation =

Studio album by Testament
- Released: April 29, 2008
- Recorded: 2007–2008
- Studios: Fantasy Studios, Berkeley, California
- Genre: Thrash metal
- Length: 49:29
- Label: Nuclear Blast
- Producers: Eric Peterson, Chuck Billy

Testament chronology
The Spitfire Collection (2007)	The Formation of Damnation (2008)	Live at Eindhoven '87 (2009)

The Formation of Damnation is the tenth studio album by American thrash metal band Testament, released on April 29, 2008. It was Testament's first album since 2001's First Strike Still Deadly and their first of new material since 1999's The Gathering. It was also Testament's first release with original guitarist Alex Skolnick since 1992's The Ritual and bassist Greg Christian since 1994's Low, as well as the band's only studio album recorded with drummer Paul Bostaph, who joined Testament in 1993 but became a full-time member in 2007 before leaving the band four years later.

The follow-up to The Gathering was first mentioned in 2002 and was originally scheduled for release in early 2004, but was not completed yet. Due to the band's touring schedule and line-up changes, the album was put on hold for a number of years before being completed in 2007/2008.

== Background information ==
Testament first mentioned their follow-up to The Gathering in May 2002, stating that guitarist Eric Peterson was busy writing new material for the album that would take "little more time since The Gathering" and be "a challenging act to follow". It was also confirmed that the album would be brutal "with a lot of dual lead trade-offs between guitarists Peterson and (then-guitarist) Steve Smyth."

On February 15, 2004, it was announced that drummer Paul Bostaph, a former member of Forbidden and Slayer, would join the band to record the album. It was also announced that the band was planning on entering the studio in April/May, with an intended release date of late 2004. The band posted a long update about progress on the album in October 2004. It was revealed that Peterson recovered from a triple fracture and leg surgery and was able to travel and work with the band again.

In February 2005, Testament manager Phil Arnold of Thrill Entertainment issued an update on the band's then-current and upcoming activities, commenting that the band had reopened their studios, which were closed while Billy received treatment for cancer, at a new location in Pittsburg, California. In September 2006, Alex Skolnick, who had rejoined the band in 2005 and replaced Smyth, stated that the band would return to the studio in early 2007 to resume work on the new album. He revealed that material was "sketched out" for the new album.

In February 2007, Billy stated that the band planned to enter the studio in April. He revealed that the band had four "really great" songs, and hoped to have the rest of the material ready within a few months. In March 2007, Peterson announced that the band was working with drummer Nick Barker on some of the material. In June, Billy announced that eight or nine songs were being worked on. The same month, the band signed with a new label, Nuclear Blast, and announced a March 2008 release date for the album. The title was revealed in November 2007, which was followed shortly thereafter by an announcement that the album's release date had been postponed to April 29, 2008.

== Reception ==
Professional ratings
Review scores
Source	Rating
About.com	4/5 stars
AllMusic	3.5/5 stars
Blabbermouth.net	9/10
IGN	8.4/10
Rock Hard	9.0/10
Sputnikmusic	4/5

The Formation of Damnation was well received. The album debuted at number 59 on the Billboard 200, selling 11,900 copies in its first week. It won the "Best Album" award at Metal Hammer Golden Gods Awards ceremony in 2008, beating albums by Atreyu, Avenged Sevenfold, Children of Bodom and Down. They later named it the 4th best album of 2008 in their end-of year top 50 albums list. In addition, Metal-Rules.com voted it the best metal album of 2008. It was also awarded with the 2008 Metal Storm Award for Best Thrash Metal Album.

"More Than Meets the Eye" was released as an official DLC for the Rock Band series, while "Henchmen Ride" was released separately on the Rock Band Network. By July 2012, The Formation of Damnation has sold over 84,000 copies in the US, and as of November 2011 it had sold around 300,000 copies worldwide.

== Track listing ==
No.	Title	Lyrics	Music	Length
1.	"For the Glory Of..." (instrumental)		Eric Peterson	1:12
2.	"More than Meets the Eye"	Chuck Billy, Del James	Billy, Peterson	4:31
3.	"The Evil Has Landed"	Billy, Steve Souza	Billy, Peterson	4:44
4.	"The Formation of Damnation"	Billy, Souza	Billy, Peterson	5:10
5.	"Dangers of the Faithless"	Billy, Del James	Billy, Peterson, Alex Skolnick	5:47
6.	"The Persecuted Won't Forget"	Billy, Souza	Billy, Peterson	5:49
7.	"Henchmen Ride"	Billy	Billy, Peterson	4:00
8.	"Killing Season"	Billy, Souza	Billy, Peterson	4:52
9.	"Afterlife"	Billy, Souza	Billy, Peterson	4:13
10.	"F.E.A.R." ("False Evidence Appearing Real")	Alex Skolnick	Skolnick	4:46
11.	"Leave Me Forever"	Billy, Souza	Billy, Greg Christian, Peterson	4:28
Total length:				49:29

== Personnel ==
Credits are adopted from the album's liner notes.

Testament

- Chuck Billy – vocals
- Alex Skolnick – lead guitar
- Eric Peterson – rhythm and lead guitar
- Greg Christian – bass
- Paul Bostaph – drums

Additional personnel

- Steve "Zetro" Souza, Steev Esquivel and Nick Souza – backing vocals
- Lyle Livingston – strings and choir keys on "For the Glory of"

Production

- Chuck Billy – production
- Eric Peterson – production, artwork direction, concepts
- Andy Sneap – recording, engineering
- Vincent Wojno – recording, engineering
- Eric Peterson – additional recording
- Andy Sneap – mixing
- Tyler Clinton – photography
- Eliran Kantor – artwork, illustrations

== Charts ==
Chart (2008)	Peak position
Austrian Albums (Ö3 Austria)	23
Belgian Albums (Ultratop Flanders)	62
Belgian Albums (Ultratop Wallonia)	89
Dutch Albums (Album Top 100)	47
Finnish Albums (Suomen virallinen lista)	12
French Albums (SNEP)	95
German Albums (Offizielle Top 100)	15
Italian Albums (FIMI)	87
Japanese Albums (Oricon)	42
Norwegian Albums (VG-lista)	29
Swedish Albums (Sverigetopplistan)	27
Swiss Albums (Schweizer Hitparade)	33
UK Independent Albums (Official Charts)	8
UK Rock & Metal Albums (Official Charts)	6
US Billboard 200	59
US Top Hard Rock Albums (Billboard)	4
US Top Rock Albums (Billboard)	16
US Indie Store Album Sales (Billboard)	5
