= First Strike Still Deadly =

Studio album of re-recorded songs by Testament
- Released: October 24, 2001
- Studio: Driftwood Studios, Oakland, California
- Genre: Thrash metal
- Length: 48:40
- Label: Spitfire

Testament chronology
The Very Best of Testament (2001)	First Strike Still Deadly (2001)	Days of Darkness (2004)

First Strike Still Deadly is the ninth studio album by Testament, released in 2001. It consists of re-recorded songs released on The Legacy and The New Order, as well as a re-recording of "Reign of Terror", which was originally on Legacy's Demo 1 and appeared as a B-side from the "Trial by Fire" single; the latter version also appeared on the 1993 EP Return to the Apocalyptic City. On some Japanese versions of this release, a different cover is present, and the disc is an enhanced CD and includes a bonus documentary produced by Reality Check TV/RCTV Studio with live clips of various incarnations of the band and interviews with Chuck Billy and Eric Peterson in various settings in and around San Francisco.

First Strike Still Deadly saw a Testament reunion with three former or current members (guitarist Alex Skolnick, bassist Steve Di Giorgio and drummer John Tempesta) as well as their original singer Steve "Zetro" Souza. Souza, Skolnick and Tempesta did not officially rejoin Testament at the time of its recording, though Skolnick did in 2005 and is still a member of the band to this day. First Strike Still Deadly was also the last Testament album with bassist Di Giorgio before his return in 2014.

== Reception ==
Professional ratings
Review scores
Source	Rating
AllMusic	1/5 stars

First Strike Still Deadly has received mostly negative reviews. AllMusic writer Brian O'Neill awards the album one star out of five, and criticizes, "Re-recording one's hits is worse than live albums because it tries to be something it never can be, and this disc is no exception. Get the originals, or even the two Testament hits compilations, for the real deal; check this out if karaoke is your idea of contemporary entertainment."

== Track listing ==
No.	Title	Lyrics	Music	Original album	Length
1.	"First Strike Is Deadly"	Steve Souza, Greg Christian	Alex Skolnick, Eric Peterson	The Legacy	4:00
2.	"Into the Pit"	Chuck Billy, Skolnick, Peterson	Skolnick, Peterson	The New Order	2:54
3.	"Trial by Fire"	Billy, Skolnick, Peterson	Skolnick, Peterson	The New Order	4:33
4.	"Disciples of the Watch"	Billy	Skolnick, Peterson	The New Order	4:34
5.	"The Preacher"	Billy, Skolnick	Skolnick, Peterson	The New Order	3:56
6.	"Burnt Offerings"	Souza, Peterson	Skolnick, Peterson	The Legacy	5:28
7.	"Over the Wall"	Souza	Skolnick, Peterson, Christian	The Legacy	4:18
8.	"The New Order"	Skolnick, Peterson	Skolnick, Peterson	The New Order	4:43
9.	"The Haunting"	Souza, Peterson	Skolnick, Peterson	The Legacy	4:37
10.	"Alone in the Dark"	Souza	Skolnick, Peterson	The Legacy	4:40
11.	"Reign of Terror"	Souza, Derrick Ramirez, Peterson	Ramirez, Peterson	B-side of the single Trial By Fire	5:06
Total length:					48:40

== Credits ==
=== Musicians ===
- Chuck Billy – vocals (tracks 1–9)
- Steve "Zetro" Souza – vocals (tracks 10 and 11)
- Alex Skolnick – lead guitar
- Eric Peterson – rhythm guitar
- Steve Di Giorgio – bass
- John Tempesta – drums

=== Other ===
- Andy Sneap – mixing

== Charts ==
Chart (2001)	Peak position
Japanese Albums (Oricon)	70
