= Alex Perialas =

American audio engineer, mixer and record producer

Alex Perialas is an American audio engineer, mixer, and record producer, best known for his extensive work during the "golden age" of thrash metal in the mid-1980s to early 1990s. Having worked with many of the genre's top acts, including Overkill, Testament, Anthrax, Nuclear Assault, S.O.D., and Flotsam & Jetsam, Perialas later went on to work with hardcore punk band Bad Religion, groove metal band Pro-Pain and hip-hop/rock band Such A Surge.

In addition to owning and operating Pyramid Sound Studios in Ithaca, New York, where he still does mixing and recording, Perialas was also the director of the Sound Recording Technology program at Ithaca College in Ithaca, NY.

== Works (1983–2015) ==
- Metallica – Kill 'Em All (1983), Mastering
- Anthrax – Fistful of Metal (1984), Assistant engineer
- Raven – Live at the Inferno (1984), Engineer
- Exciter – Violence & Force (1984), Assistant engineer
- Anthrax – Armed and Dangerous (1985), Engineer
- Overkill – Feel the Fire (1985), Engineer
- Raven – Stay Hard (1985), Assistant engineer
- S.O.D. – Speak English or Die (1985), Producer (with Scott Ian), engineer
- Anthrax – Spreading the Disease (1985), Engineer
- Nuclear Assault – Brain Death (EP) (1986), Producer
- E-X-E – Stricken by Might (1986), Engineer
- AT WAR- Retaliatory Strike (1987) Producer, engineer
- M.O.D. – U.S.A. for M.O.D. (1987), Producer (with Scott Ian), engineer
- Testament – The Legacy (1987), Producer, engineer
- Carnivore – Retaliation (1987), Producer, engineer, mixer
- Nuclear Assault – Game Over (1987), Producer, engineer
- Testament – Live at Eindhoven (1987), Producer, engineer
- Overkill – !!!Fuck You!!! EP (1987), Producer
- Overkill – Taking Over (1987), Producer, engineer
- Blessed Death – Destined for Extinction (1987), Producer
- Agnostic Front – Liberty and Justice For... (1987), Engineer
- Overkill – Under the Influence (1988), Producer (with Overkill), engineer
- Testament – The New Order (1988), Producer, engineer, mixer
- M.O.D. – Surfin' M.O.D. (1988), Producer, engineer, mixer
- Anthrax – State of Euphoria (1988), Associate producer, engineer
- Testament – Practice What You Preach (1989), Producer
- Anthrax – Penikufesin EP (1989), Associate producer, engineer
- M.O.D. – Gross Misconduct (1989), Producer, engineer
- Holy Moses – The New Machine of Liechtenstein (1989), Producer
- Flotsam & Jetsam – When the Storm Comes Down (1990), Producer, engineer, mixer
- Vio-lence – Oppressing the Masses (1990), Producer, engineer, mixer
- Wrathchild America – 3-D (1991), Producer, engineer
- Silence – 3 song demo tape featuring "One Race" (1991), Engineer, recorder, mixer
- Blessed Death – Hour of Pain (1991), Producer
- S.O.D. – Live at Budokan (1992), Producer, engineer, mixing
- Pro-Pain – Foul Taste of Freedom (1992), Producer, engineer, mixer
- Piece Dogs – Exes for Eyes (1992)
- Overkill – I Hear Black (1993), Producer (with Overkill), engineer
- Testament – Return to the Apocalyptic City (1993), Producer, engineer
- Strip Mind- Whats in Your mouth (1993), Producer
- LWS (Holland) – Reality (1993), Producer
- Accuser – Reflections (1994), Producer
- Pro-Pain – The Truth Hurts (1994), Producer (with Gary Meskil)
- M.O.D. – Devolution (1994), Mastering
- BELLADONNA (Joey Belladonna solo album) 1995 - Producer (w/ Joey Belladonna), and engineer
- Such A Surge – Schatten (1995), Producer
- Accuser – Taken by the Throat (1995), Producer
- Such A Surge – Under Pressure (1995), Producer (all but one track)
- Without Warning – Believe (1996), Producer
- Without Warning – Step Beyond (1998), Producer
- Bad Religion – No Substance (1998), Producer (with Bad Religion & Ronnie Kimball), engineer
- Overkill – Coverkill (1999), Mixer
- Joe Bonamassa – A New Day Yesterday (2000), Production assistance, engineer, mixer
- Nerve Damage - Self-titled EP. (2005) Mixing / Mastering
- Giant Panda Guerilla Dub Squad – Slow Down (2006), Producer, engineer
- At War – Infidel (2009), Producer, engineer
- Birth A.D. – I Blame You (2013), Producer, engineer, mixing
- Seeming — Worldburners (2015), mixing
