= The Ritual (Testament album) =

Studio album by Testament
- Released: May 12, 1992
- Recorded: 1991–1992
- Studios: One on One, Los Angeles
- Genres: Heavy metal; thrash metal
- Length: 54:24
- Label: Atlantic
- Producer: Tony Platt

Testament chronology
Souls of Black (1990)	The Ritual (1992)	Return to the Apocalyptic City (1993)

The Ritual is the fifth studio album by American thrash metal band Testament, released on May 12, 1992, by Atlantic Records. It was their last studio album to feature drummer Louie Clemente and guitarist Alex Skolnick, until the latter rejoined the band in 2005. It was also their first album to be released and distributed only by Atlantic, whereas Testament's previous four albums were co-released by Megaforce Records. Produced by Tony Platt, the album marked a major stylistic shift for the band, moving towards a heavy metal sound.

== Background ==
The Ritual was recorded throughout 1991 and early 1992 at One on One Recording in Los Angeles under producer Tony Platt, with six to seven months spent writing, followed by six weeks of recording; it was the longest time Testament had taken to make an album by this point, compared to most of their previous albums taking less than a month or two to be recorded. Given their time off from touring, after having completed the promotional tour for Souls of Black as early as the spring of 1991, this was Testament's first studio album not to be released a year after their previous one, as guitarist Eric Peterson noted, "By the end of the [Souls of Black] tour, we were exhausted. We had been doing so much touring and we needed to write a new record. So we went back home and started working on The Ritual." In a 1992 interview with the Deseret News, drummer Louie Clemente noted that, with Platt's involvement in the production, the band had more time to work on the album compared to their limited previous experience in recording studios: "We took the longest time to produce The Ritual. It was a much-needed change. It got to a time when we were pumping out a record every year", and added that the band "needed to slow down" and "needed to chill", following the hurried production of Souls of Black.

In support of The Ritual, Testament toured for over a year with bands like Black Sabbath, Iron Maiden, Megadeth, White Zombie, Corrosion of Conformity, Pro-Pain, D.R.I., Green Jellÿ, Body Count and Gwar. By the end of 1992, during the middle of the tour, guitarist Alex Skolnick had decided to leave the band, with Clemente following suit. Several lineup changes took place before guitarist James Murphy and drummer John Tempesta were hired for the band's next album Low.

== Musical style ==
On The Ritual, Testament began exploring a slower and more melodic approach while still maintaining their thrash roots. Certain songs on the album, including the title track (the longest song they had recorded at the time) and "Return to Serenity", also see the band continuing to explore a technical and progressive vein that was used on Practice What You Preach and Souls of Black. Drummer Louie Clemente also acknowledged the musical change compared to their previous albums, explaining to Deseret News: "The Ritual is slower and geared toward the old style of metal while The Legacy was pure thrash. In fact, every release has been different. We've progressed naturally." He also stated that Tony Platt's production role within the album helped Testament "get more of a vibe" and "a fresh set of ears to listen to the mix."

== Reception ==
Professional ratings
Review scores
Source	Rating
AllMusic	3.5/5 stars
Collector's Guide to Heavy Metal	9/10

The album was a minor success, reaching No. 55 on the American Billboard 200. This would be Testament's highest position in their career, until 2012's Dark Roots of Earth, which reached No. 12 on the same chart. The record also spawned the band's only charting single "Return to Serenity", which reached No. 22 on Mainstream Rock Tracks. By June 2007, The Ritual had sold 485,000 copies in the United States.

== Track listing ==
No.	Title	Lyrics	Music	Length
1.	"Signs of Chaos" (instrumental)		Alex Skolnick	0:30
2.	"Electric Crown"	Skolnick, Billy	Skolnick, Peterson	5:31
3.	"So Many Lies"	Billy, James, Peterson	Skolnick, Peterson	6:04
4.	"Let Go of My World"	Billy, James	Peterson	3:45
5.	"The Ritual"	Skolnick, Billy, James, Peterson	Skolnick, Peterson	7:34
6.	"Deadline"	Skolnick, Billy	Skolnick	4:47
7.	"As the Seasons Grey"	Billy, James	Skolnick, Peterson	6:16
8.	"Agony"	Billy, James	Peterson	4:07
9.	"The Sermon"	Billy, James	Peterson	4:48
10.	"Return to Serenity"	Billy, James, Peterson	Peterson	6:30
11.	"Troubled Dreams"	Billy, James, Peterson	Skolnick, Peterson	5:14
Total length:				54:29

== Personnel ==
=== Testament ===
- Chuck Billy – vocals
- Alex Skolnick – lead guitar
- Eric Peterson – rhythm guitar
- Greg Christian – bass
- Louie Clemente – drums

=== Production ===
- Arranged by Testament
- Produced and recorded by Tony Platt
- Recorded at One on One Studios; assisted by Ulrich Wild
- Mixed by Nigel Green at Battery Studios
- Assistant mixing engineer: Sarah Bedingham
- Mastered by George Marino at Sterling Sound
- "Signs of Chaos", "Electric Crown", and "Deadline" published by COTLOD Music/Zomba Enterprises, Inc. All other songs published by COTLOD Music/Zomba Enterprises, Inc./Mamatoneck Music/Virgin Songs, Inc.
- Album cover artwork by William Benson

== Charts ==
Chart (1992)	Peak position
Finnish Albums (The Official Finnish Charts)	40
German Albums (Offizielle Top 100)	73
Japanese Albums (Oricon)	58
UK Albums (Official Charts)	48
US Billboard 200	55
