= The New Order (album) =

Studio album by Testament
- Released: May 10, 1988
- Recorded: January–February 1988
- Studio: Pyramid (Ithaca, New York)
- Genre: Thrash metal
- Length: 39:22
- Labels: Atlantic; Megaforce
- Producer: Alex Perialas

Testament chronology
Live at Eindhoven (1987)	The New Order (1988)	Practice What You Preach (1989)

Singles from The New Order
- 1. "Trial by Fire" Released: 1988

The New Order is the second studio album by American thrash metal band Testament, released on May 10, 1988. It was the band's first album to chart on the Billboard 200, peaking at number 136, and is considered to be an essential release of the late 1980s thrash metal scene.

== Background and recording ==
While on tour in promotion of their 1987 debut album The Legacy, Testament began writing multiple songs on an acoustic guitar in the back of their tour bus, many of them would later appear on The New Order. Guitarist Alex Skolnick recounts of the album recording process:

"We barely got done with our first couple of tours on that first album cycle when we were informed we have to have another album, soon! [...] We got spooked in a way, because we never had to come up with music on the fly. [...] By the time we finally recorded the album, we neglected to look at our recording contract. We actually had it in our contract that there's a minimum of 40 minutes of music, and we clocked in under that! [...] Our album was promptly sent back...we added the Aerosmith tune, we added those little instrumentals, we extended a couple of sections...that was all done so we wouldn't be in breach of contract."

— Alex Skolnick, 2013 via Metal Injection.

The recording sessions of The New Order took place in January and February 1988 at Pyramid Sound Studios in Ithaca, New York, the same studio where The Legacy was recorded. One of Testament's earliest songs dating back to their period as Legacy, "Reign of Terror", was reportedly recorded during the sessions of The New Order, but was left off the album. This re-recorded version of "Reign of Terror" can be found as a b-side to the "Trial by Fire" single as well as the band's 1993 EP Return to the Apocalyptic City. The song would be re-recorded again in 2001 for the album First Strike Still Deadly.

== Reception and legacy ==
Professional ratings
Review scores
Source	Rating
AllMusic	4.5/5 stars
Rock Hard	8.5/10

Reviews for The New Order have generally been favorable. AllMusic's Alex Henderson awards the album four-and-a-half stars out of five, and claims that Testament "delivered its best offering ever" and describes it as "every bit as brutally forceful as The Legacy." He also called the album the "ideal choice." Adam McCann of Metal Digest wrote: "Even though there had less than a year between The Legacy and The New Order, Testament already showed significant progress as songwriters as they crafted excellent thrash metal that got the listeners to get up off their arse and get into the pit. This was the sound of Chuck Billy, Alex Skolnick and co. firing on all cylinders as they battered their way out of the Bay Area and into the thrash metal mainstream."

The New Order was the album that broke Testament into the thrash metal mainstream, backed by its only single "Trial by Fire" which featured a music video, as did the cover of Aerosmith's "Nobody's Fault". This success would only grow with their next album Practice What You Preach. It was also the first Testament album to enter the Billboard 200, reaching number 136 on that chart, and the band's first album to include an instrumental track. The album contains many songs that the band still plays live to this day including "Into the Pit", "The Preacher", "The New Order", "Disciples of the Watch", and "Trial by Fire". "Into the Pit", "The New Order", and "Disciples of the Watch" are among Testament's most frequently performed songs; all three of which have been played live over 600 times with the former of the three being their most played song live. By 1990, the album had sold over 250,000 copies in the U.S.

It was announced in June 2024 that The New Order (along with The Legacy) was being remastered and would be released on July 12.

=== Accolades ===
- In 2007, Revolver called it one of their 20 essential eighties thrash albums.
- In 2014, Revolver also placed The New Order on its "14 Thrash Albums You Need to Own" list.
- In 2016, Loudwire ranked the album as Testament's second best.
- In 2017, Loudwire also listed the album as the 18th best thrash metal album of all time.
- In 2018, Decibel inducted the album into their hall of fame.
- The same year, Loudwire placed it among the best metal albums of 1988.

== Touring and promotion ==
Testament toured for three months to promote The New Order. They toured Europe shortly after its release alongside thrash acts Megadeth, Sanctuary, Flotsam and Jetsam and Nuclear Assault. This was followed by a summer U.S. tour, which featured support from Vio-Lence, Forbidden, Voivod, Sanctuary, Destruction, Overkill, Nuclear Assault, Carnivore, Death Angel, Atheist and Potential Threat. They toured Europe again in August, replacing Megadeth on the Monsters of Rock tour. After playing two shows in San Francisco in December 1988, and one show with Heathen at the Country Club in Reseda in January 1989, Testament began work on their third studio album Practice What You Preach.

== Track listing ==
No.	Title	Lyrics	Music	Length
1.	"Eerie Inhabitants"	Alex Skolnick, Chuck Billy, Eric Peterson	Skolnick, Peterson	5:06
2.	"The New Order"	Skolnick, Peterson	Skolnick, Peterson	4:25
3.	"Trial by Fire"	Billy, Skolnick, Peterson	Skolnick, Peterson	4:14
4.	"Into the Pit"	Billy, Skolnick, Peterson	Skolnick, Peterson	2:46
5.	"Hypnosis" (Instrumental)		Skolnick, Peterson	2:04
6.	"Disciples of the Watch"	Billy	Skolnick, Peterson	5:05
7.	"The Preacher"	Billy, Skolnick	Skolnick, Peterson	3:37
8.	"Nobody's Fault" (Aerosmith cover, not on LP)	Steven Tyler	Tyler, Brad Whitford	3:57
9.	"A Day of Reckoning"	Billy	Skolnick, Peterson	4:00
10.	"Musical Death (A Dirge)" (Instrumental)		Skolnick, Peterson	4:05
Total length:				39:22

== Cover versions ==
- The track "Into the Pit" was covered by The Absence on their 2007 album, Riders of the Plague.
- The track "The Preacher" was covered by Hell's Thrash Horsemen on their 2009 EP, ...Till Violence.

== Personnel ==
Testament

- Chuck Billy – vocals
- Alex Skolnick – lead guitar
- Eric Peterson – rhythm guitar; 2nd solo on Musical Death (A Dirge)
- Greg Christian – bass
- Louie Clemente – drums

Production

- Tom Coyne – mastering
- Robert Hunter – assistant engineering
- Alex Perialas – production, engineering, mixing
- Jon Zazula – executive production
- Marsha Zazula – executive production
- Andy Meyn – photography
- William Benson – artwork
- Eric Peterson – cover art concept

== Charts ==
Chart (1988)	Peak position
Dutch Albums (Album Top 100)	66
Finnish Albums (The Official Finnish Charts)	12
German Albums (Offizielle Top 100)	49
Swedish Albums (Sverigetopplistan)	49
UK Albums (Official Charts)	81
US Billboard 200	136
