= The Legacy (album) =

Studio album by Testament
- Released: April 21, 1987
- Recorded: January 1987
- Studio: Pyramid (Ithaca, New York)
- Genres: Thrash metal, neoclassical metal
- Length: 38:45
- Labels: Atlantic; Megaforce
- Producer: Alex Perialas

Testament chronology
| The Legacy (1987) | Live at Eindhoven (1987) |

Singles from The Legacy
- 1. "Over the Wall" Released: 1987

The Legacy is the debut studio album by American thrash metal band Testament. It was released on April 21, 1987.

== Background ==
Prior to the album's recording in January 1987, Testament was known as Legacy. Their lineup consisted of singer Steve "Zetro" Souza, guitarists Alex Skolnick and Eric Peterson, bassist Greg Christian and drummer Louie Clemente. Singer Chuck Billy was a member of another local band named Guilt. He had performed with Legacy on a few occasions and was asked to become the new singer after Souza left to join Exodus. Souza had asked Billy if he would replace him which Billy agreed to do so; Souza then gave him Peterson's number. Billy auditioned for the spot and then performed on a three-track demo for Megaforce label owner Jon Zazula, thus officially joining the band.

During the recording process, the band relocated from their native San Francisco, California to Ithaca, New York to work with producer Alex Perialas. Perialas was recommended to the band by label owner Zazula. It was mastered at Frankford Wayne Mastering Labs in New York City.

About a month prior to the release of The Legacy, the band changed their name to Testament after finding out that there was an R&B hotel cover band named Legacy. The Testament name was suggested by Billy Milano (from S.O.D. and M.O.D.), who was a friend of the band in the early days.

This was the only Testament album to feature songwriting contributions from Souza, who was credited as the co-writer of all the songs, except for "C.O.T.L.O.D." and "Do or Die", which were co-written by original Legacy singer Derrick Ramirez and Billy respectively. The closing track, "Apocalyptic City", was written by Skolnick and Peterson. The song "Reign of Terror" was also supposed to appear on the record but did not make the cut. The band had spent downtime drinking at local bars throughout the recording process. Billy later stated "Maybe it was due to my vocals sounding so drunk? Perhaps the record was just too long." The song was later released as a B-side to the "Trial by Fire" single.

It was announced in June 2024 that the album and The New Order were being remastered and would be released on July 12.

== Touring and promotion ==
In support of The Legacy, Testament went on a worldwide tour from June 1987 to April 1988. During the American leg of their tour, they were the opening act for Anthrax on the Among the Living tour, toured through the South and the East Coast with Overkill and played two shows in Northern California with Megadeth. After an appearance at Dynamo Open Air in June 1987 (recorded for the live EP Live at Eindhoven), Testament embarked on their first tour of Europe as the opening act for Anthrax. Touring for The Legacy ended in April 1988, shortly before the release of The New Order.

== Reception and awards ==
Professional ratings
Review scores
| Source | Rating |
|---|---|
| Allmusic | 4.5/5 stars |

The Legacy received favorable reviews by music critics. AllMusic's Alex Henderson rated the album four-and-a-half stars out of five, and said that it saw Testament earn respect in "thrash circles" and called it "a relentlessly heavy and promising effort focusing on such subjects as the occult, witchcraft, nuclear war, and global destruction." Henderson also praised Alex Perialas' production on The Legacy as "superb -- well respected in metal circles", and added that Perialas had "obviously encouraged Testament to play hard and let it rip." Adam McCann of Metal Digest wrote, "If you're going to get out there and make a statement, then The Legacy is a way to establish your erm… legacy. This was thrash metal right to its core, it was full of passion and integrity that was starting to drift away from those bands which had become more established and signed to major labels. Even now, The Legacy sounds great with tracks like 'Apocalyptic City', 'The Haunting' and 'Burnt Offerings' leading the charge and although the production wasn't fantastic, thrash never needed that to create some spectacular." Malcom Dome of Metal Hammer dubbed it "one of thrash metal's true landmark albums."

Within three years after its release in 1987, The Legacy had sold over 150,000 copies in the U.S.

=== Accolades ===
- The album was also included on "Frank's Favorite Records of 1987" on Metal Injection.
- In 2008, Decibel inducted the album into their hall of fame.
  - They later ranked the album as Testament's third best.
- In 2015, VH1 listed the album as one of the greatest thrash debuts.
- Loudwire gave the album numerous accolades:
  - In 2013, they called it the 13th best debut metal album of all time.
  - In 2015, they ranked the album number three on their top ten list of "Thrash Albums NOT Released by the Big 4".
  - In 2016, they ranked the album as Testament's best.
  - In 2017, they listed the album as the 11th best thrash metal album of all time.
  - In 2020, they included the album on their list of the best debut thrash albums of all time.

== Track listing ==
| No. | Title | Lyrics | Music | Length |
|---|---|---|---|---|
| 1. | "Over the Wall" | Souza | Peterson, Skolnick, Christian | 4:07 |
| 2. | "The Haunting" | Souza, Peterson | Skolnick, Peterson | 4:17 |
| 3. | "Burnt Offerings" | Souza, Peterson | Skolnick, Peterson | 5:07 |
| 4. | "Raging Waters" | Souza, Peterson | Peterson | 4:32 |
| 5. | "C.O.T.L.O.D." (Curse of the Legions of Death) | Ramirez, Peterson | Ramirez, Peterson | 2:32 |
| 6. | "First Strike Is Deadly" | Souza, Christian | Peterson, Skolnick | 3:43 |
| 7. | "Do or Die" | Skolnick, Peterson, Billy | Skolnick, Peterson, Clemente | 4:39 |
| 8. | "Alone in the Dark" | Souza | Skolnick, Peterson | 4:05 |
| 9. | "Apocalyptic City" | Skolnick, Peterson | Skolnick, Peterson | 5:51 |
| Total length: | | | | 38:45 |

== Personnel ==
Writing, performance and production credits are adapted from the album liner notes.

Testament

- Chuck Billy – vocals
- Alex Skolnick – lead guitar
- Eric Peterson – rhythm guitar
- Greg Christian – bass
- Louie Clemente – drums

Production

- Alex Perialas – production, engineering
- Jon Zazula – production (exec.)
- Marsha Zazula – production (exec.)
- Tom Coyne – mastering

Artwork and design

- Eric Peterson – logo concept
- Bill Benson – logo art
- Alexis Olson – cover concept
- Dan Muro – cover photography, special effects
