= Eric Peterson (guitarist) =

American guitarist (born 1964)

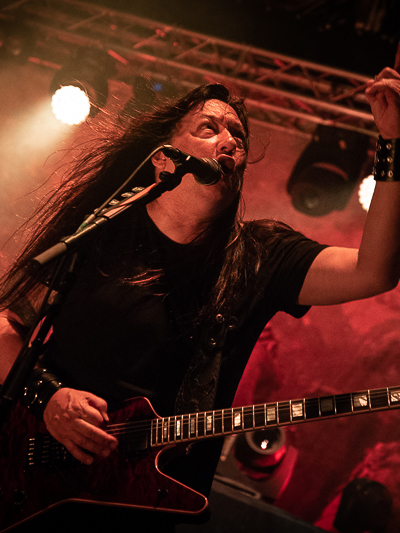
- Peterson performing in 2022

Background information
- Born: Eric Stanley Peterson; May 14, 1964 (age 62)
- Origin: Berkeley, California, U.S.
- Genres: Thrash metal; heavy metal; death metal; black metal
- Occupation: Musician
- Instruments: Guitar; vocals
- Years active: 1983–present
- Member of: Testament; Dragonlord

Eric Stanley Peterson (born May 14, 1964) is an American musician, best known as the rhythm guitarist of the thrash metal band Testament and the only remaining original member left in the band, which first started in 1983 under the name Legacy. He and lead vocalist Chuck Billy are the only members to appear on all of the band's studio albums.

Peterson also has a side project black metal band called Dragonlord, in which he plays guitar and also sings. In Testament, Peterson was originally a rhythm guitarist while Alex Skolnick handled all lead work. More recently though, Peterson plays leads along with Skolnick.

== Career ==
=== Testament ===
In 1983, Peterson co-founded the band Legacy (which late changed its name to Testament) alongside his cousin Derrick Ramirez. They eventually hired drummer Louie Clemente, vocalist Steve "Zetro" Souza and bassist Greg Christian, and began playing shows with bands like Exodus, Slayer, Anthrax, Lȧȧz Rockit, and Death Angel, among others. Their debut album Legacy was released in 1987, since then Peterson has remained the bands only original member and has recorded 14 albums the most recent being Para Bellum (2025).

=== Dragonlord ===
In 2001, Peterson formed a side project called Dragonlord alongside Testament bandmate Steve Di Giorgio and Steve Smyth of Nevermore. Peterson's started the band due to having an interest in darker music, and not being able to do that with Testament. The group have released three albums with the most recent being Dominion in 2018.

== Musical influences ==
Peterson has cited Led Zeppelin, Black Sabbath, Aerosmith, Kiss, Judas Priest, Boston, Scorpions, UFO, Montrose, Pat Travers and Mahogany Rush (with Frank Marino) as influences and inspirations to him. When forming the sound of Legacy/Testament, he had been influenced by the band's Bay Area peers Metallica and Exodus, in addition to NWOBHM bands such as Judas Priest, Venom, Saxon and Angel Witch, and European heavy metal bands like Mercyful Fate.

== Personal life ==
Peterson was formerly married to his wife Rebecca, with whom they had one child together. He also has a daughter from another relationship. He resides in Northern California.

During Testaments 2004, European Tour he fell down a flight of stairs resulting in a fracture that put him in the hospital in Vienna, Austria for 12 days. He spent the rest of the Summer in physical therapy and by October of that year he was able to drive again.

== Discography ==
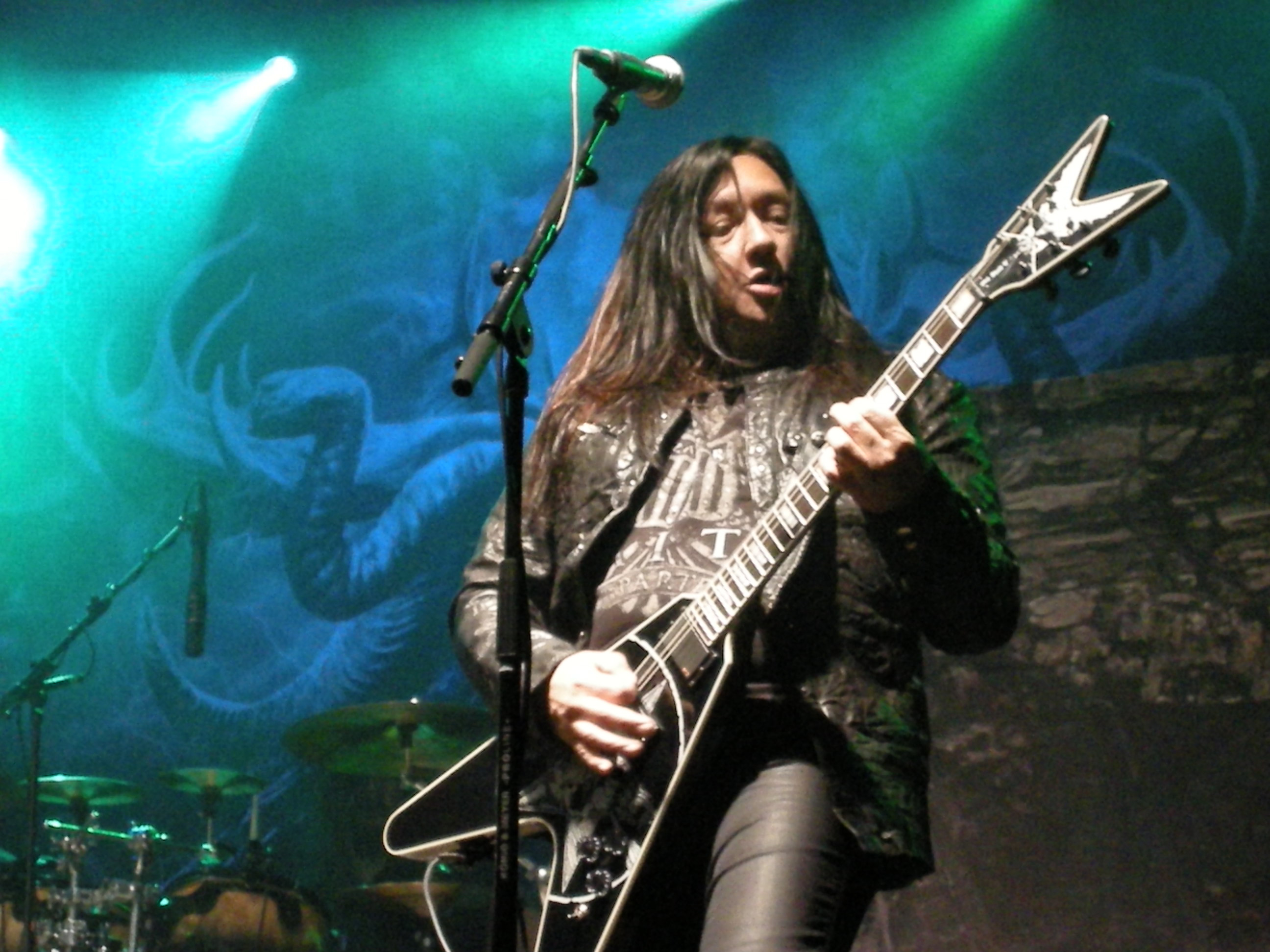
Peterson with Testament in 2012

=== With Legacy ===
- Demo 1 (1984)
- Demo 2 (1985)

=== With Testament ===
- The Legacy (1987)
- The New Order (1988)
- Practice What You Preach (1989)
- Souls of Black (1990)
- The Ritual (1992)
- Return to the Apocalyptic City (1993)
- Low (1994)
- Demonic (1997)
- The Gathering (1999)
- First Strike Still Deadly (2001)
- The Formation of Damnation (2008)
- Dark Roots of Earth (2012)
- Brotherhood of the Snake (2016)
- Titans of Creation (2020)
- Para Bellum (2025)

=== With Dragonlord ===
- Rapture (2001)
- Black Wings of Destiny (2005)
- Dominion (2018)

=== With Leah ===
- "Dreamland" (2013)
- "Winter Sun" (2015)

=== Guest appearances ===
- Old Man's Child – Vermin (2005)
