= Greg Christian =

American bassist

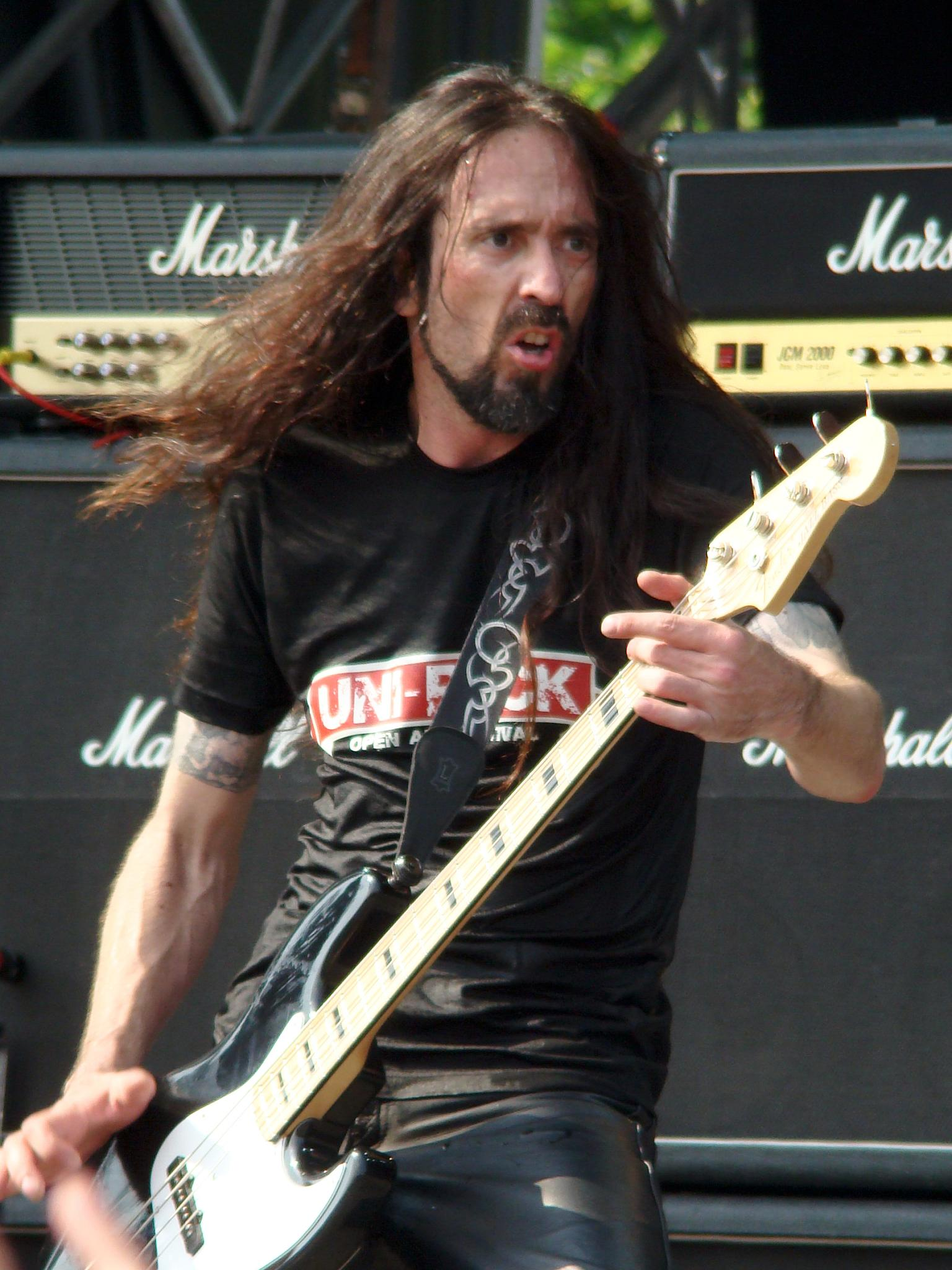
- Christian performing in 2007

Background information
- Born: Gregory Christian; April 29, 1966 (age 60)
- Origin: Pleasanton, California, U.S.
- Genres: Heavy metal, thrash metal
- Occupation: Bassist
- Years active: 1983–present

Gregory Christian (born April 29, 1966) is an American musician who is the former bassist for thrash metal band Testament. He left the band in 1996, but rejoined in 2004 and left again in 2014. In addition to Testament, Christian has also played in HavocHate and Trinity Fallen, and later served as the bassist for Trauma. He is known for his finger playing style and jazz-like bass parts, which can be heard on Testament songs such as "Souls of Black" and "Disciples of the Watch", although he has also occasionally been seen using a guitar pick. Christian also performed backing vocals in Testament.

== Career ==
=== Testament ===
Christian is an original member of Testament, having joined in 1983 when they were called Legacy. Prior the release of their debut album The Legacy, Christian auditioned for Metallica as the replacement for Cliff Burton, but lost to former Flotsam and Jetsam bassist Jason Newsted. He recorded eight of the band's albums, including The Legacy (1987), The New Order (1988), Practice What You Preach (1989), Souls of Black (1990), The Ritual (1992), Low (1994), The Formation of Damnation (2008), and Dark Roots of Earth (2012). He also played on their live albums Live at Eindhoven (1987), Return to the Apocalyptic City (1993), Live at the Fillmore (1995), Live in London (2005) and Dark Roots of Thrash (2013). In 1996, Christian left Testament, but rejoined in 2004. He left the band once again in early 2014 and was replaced by Steve Di Giorgio as bassist. Christian left due to lack of band financial transparency and inequitable payments by controlling members of Testament, Chuck Billy and Eric Peterson.

=== HavocHate ===
Christian joined HavocHate in 2005, and recorded one album, Cycle of Pain.

=== Trauma ===
On June 27, 2017, it was announced that Christian had joined Trauma. He departed from the group in August 2022. In a press release announcing a new album, the band said "both parties came to a mutual decision" and wished Christian well in his future musical endeavors.

=== Hand of Fire ===
On March 10, 2019, it was announced Christian joined Hand of Fire as their bassist, as well as Jason Borton of Jungle Rot on drums. Subsequently, both left the band after a brief stay.
