= Practice What You Preach =

Studio album by Testament
- Released: August 8, 1989
- Recorded: February–March 1989
- Studios: Fantasy, Berkeley, California
- Genres: Thrash metal; heavy metal; progressive metal
- Length: 46:06
- Labels: Atlantic; Megaforce
- Producer: Alex Perialas

Testament chronology
The New Order (1988)	Practice What You Preach (1989)	Souls of Black (1990)

Practice What You Preach is the third studio album by American thrash metal band Testament, released on August 8, 1989 via Atlantic/Megaforce. Propelled by the singles "Greenhouse Effect", "The Ballad" and the title track "Practice What You Preach", it was a major breakthrough for Testament, achieving near-gold status and becoming the band's first album to enter the Top 100 on the Billboard 200 chart.

== Background ==
While retaining the thrash metal sound of its predecessors, Practice What You Preach saw Testament draw influences from numerous genres such as traditional heavy metal, jazz fusion and progressive music, and its lyrical themes are more about politics and society than the occult themes of the band's previous two albums. Though the album broke through to the mainstream, the creative changes alienated some early fans of Testament. Songs like the title track and "Blessed in Contempt" relate to religion, while "Greenhouse Effect" is a political song about an "environmental holocaust", "Sins of Omission" deals with suicide prevention, and "The Ballad" is about a break up and recovery.

Reportedly recorded live in the studio, this was the band's last album to be produced by Alex Perialas, and the production values can be loosely compared to Flotsam and Jetsam's 1990 album When the Storm Comes Down, which was also produced by Perialas and recorded shortly after the release of Practice What You Preach.

Besides the title track, which has been a staple of the band's concert setlists for more than three decades, Testament had rarely played any songs from Practice What You Preach for years. Until 2025, "Confusion Fusion" was the only song from the album that had never been performed in concert. "Envy Life" and "Sins of Omission" were played live again occasionally in the 2000s and 2010s, and the rest – "Perilous Nation" (save for one show in New York in 2008), "Time Is Coming", "Blessed in Contempt", "Greenhouse Effect", "The Ballad" and "Nightmare (Coming Back to You)" – had not been included in performances since the early 1990s. To celebrate its belated 35th anniversary, the band performed the Practice What You Preach album live in its entirety for the first time on their U.S. "An Evening with Testament" tour in April and May 2025.

A remastered version of the album (remastered by Justin Shturtz) was released in 2026 by Nuclear Blast. It included new cover art by Bill Benson (who also designed the original cover art), a booklet showcasing old photos and documents along with newly provided liner notes.

== Reception ==
Professional ratings
Review scores
Source	Rating
AllMusic	3/5 stars

Reviews for Practice What You Preach have generally been favorable. Allmusic's Alex Henderson awards it three stars out of five, and about the album, he says that Testament placed "more emphasis on subjects like freedom of choice, political corruption, hypocrisy, and the effects of greed and avarice" and that "its musical approach is much the same -- under the direction of metal producer Alex Perialas."

Practice What You Preach was Testament's first record to enter the Top 100 on the Billboard 200 album charts, peaking at number 77 and staying on the chart for twelve weeks. The title track of Practice What You Preach was a moderate mainstream rock hit, as were "The Ballad" and "Greenhouse Effect". These songs received considerable airplay from album-oriented rock radio stations, while its music videos found significant rotation on MTV's Headbangers Ball. By June 1992, Practice What You Preach had sold over 450,000 copies in the United States.

The album has been included in various best-of lists in the years since its release, including Guitar World's "The Top 10 Shred Albums of the Eighties" in 1999; the magazine's editor Mordechai Kleidermacher wrote, "With their fast-and-chunky riffs and scorched-earth solos, Testament's Alex Skolnick and Eric Peterson show the world what true thrash-and-burn guitar terror is all about. Combining the sophistication of a progressive guy with the ferocity of a metal guy, Skolnick's guitar weeps, wails, sings, roars and rocks."

== Touring and promotion ==
Testament toured for less than a year to promote Practice What You Preach. They embarked on a two-month U.S. tour from October to December 1989 with Annihilator and Wrathchild America (both of whom had just released their respective debut albums Alice in Hell and Climbin' the Walls), and wrapped the year up with two shows in California with Nuclear Assault and Voivod. The second leg of the Practice What You Preach tour began in January 1990, when Testament was touring Europe with Mortal Sin and Xentrix. Following their first visit to Japan that February, Testament embarked on a two-month U.S. tour with Savatage which featured support from Nuclear Assault, Dead Horse, and Dark Angel. After the Practice What You Preach tour came to an end in May 1990, Testament began work on their fourth studio album Souls of Black.

== Track listing ==
All music is composed by Chuck Billy, Alex Skolnick, Eric Peterson, Greg Christian and Louie Clemente.

No.	Title	Lyrics	Length
1.	"Practice What You Preach"	Billy, Peterson, Skolnick	4:54
2.	"Perilous Nation"	Skolnick	5:50
3.	"Envy Life"	Peterson	4:16
4.	"Time Is Coming"	Billy	5:26
5.	"Blessed in Contempt"	Billy, Skolnick, Peterson	4:12
6.	"Greenhouse Effect"	Skolnick	4:52
7.	"Sins of Omission"	Billy, Peterson, Skolnick	5:00
8.	"The Ballad"	Skolnick, Billy	6:09
9.	"Nightmare (Coming Back to You)"	Skolnick	2:20
10.	"Confusion Fusion"	Instrumental	3:07
Total length:			46:06

== Personnel ==
Testament

- Chuck Billy – vocals
- Alex Skolnick – lead and rhythm guitar
- Eric Peterson – rhythm and lead guitar
- Greg Christian – bass
- Louie Clemente – drums

Additional performers

- Mark Walters – backing vocals
- Bogdan Jablonski – backing vocals
- Willy Lang – backing vocals
- Elliot Cahn – backing vocals

Technical personnel

- Alex Perialas – production, recording, mixing
- David Pigg – production associate for guitars
- Roy Rowland – production associate for vocals
- Michael Rosen – assistant engineering and additional engineering
- Tom Coyne – mastering
- William Benson – cover art

== Charts ==
Chart (1989)	Peak position
Dutch Albums (Album Top 100)	57
Finnish Albums (The Official Finnish Charts)	10
German Albums (Offizielle Top 100)	29
Norwegian Albums (VG-lista)	20
UK Albums (Official Charts)	40
US Billboard 200	77
