= Louie Clemente =

American drummer

- Born: January 23, 1965 (age 60); United States
- Genres: Thrash metal
- Occupation: Drummer
- Years active: 1983–1992, 2005
- Formerly of: Testament

Louie Clemente (born January 23, 1965) is a former drummer for the Bay Area thrash metal band Testament. He is known for being a part of Testament's original lineup.

== Testament ==
Clemente joined Testament in 1983 when they were called Legacy, and appeared on their first five studio albums, The Legacy (1987), The New Order (1988), Practice What You Preach (1989), Souls of Black (1990) and The Ritual (1992), as well as the live EP Live at Eindhoven (1987). In 1992 he left the band at the same time as guitarist Alex Skolnick. Clemente moved to a more stable career outside music, but agreed to share drum duties in 2005 during the classic reunion lineup in London. Unable to perform touring duties, after not having played a full set for 13 years, Clemente never officially rejoined Testament, but has called the London show one of the top points of his life. He has not played with Testament since. By 2021, Clemente was Testament's longest-serving drummer, having been a member of the band for nine years; this record was surpassed by drummer Gene Hoglan, who has been in the band from when he rejoined in 2011 to 2022, fourteen years after briefly being in the band for their seventh studio album Demonic. Clemente also holds the distinction of being the only drummer to record at least five albums with the band. During his tenure in Testament, he played Tama drums and Paiste cymbals.

== Personal life ==
Clemente has a daughter named Angelina (born January 28, 1985) and a grandson named Felix.
