= Chuck Billy =

American heavy metal vocalist (born 1962)

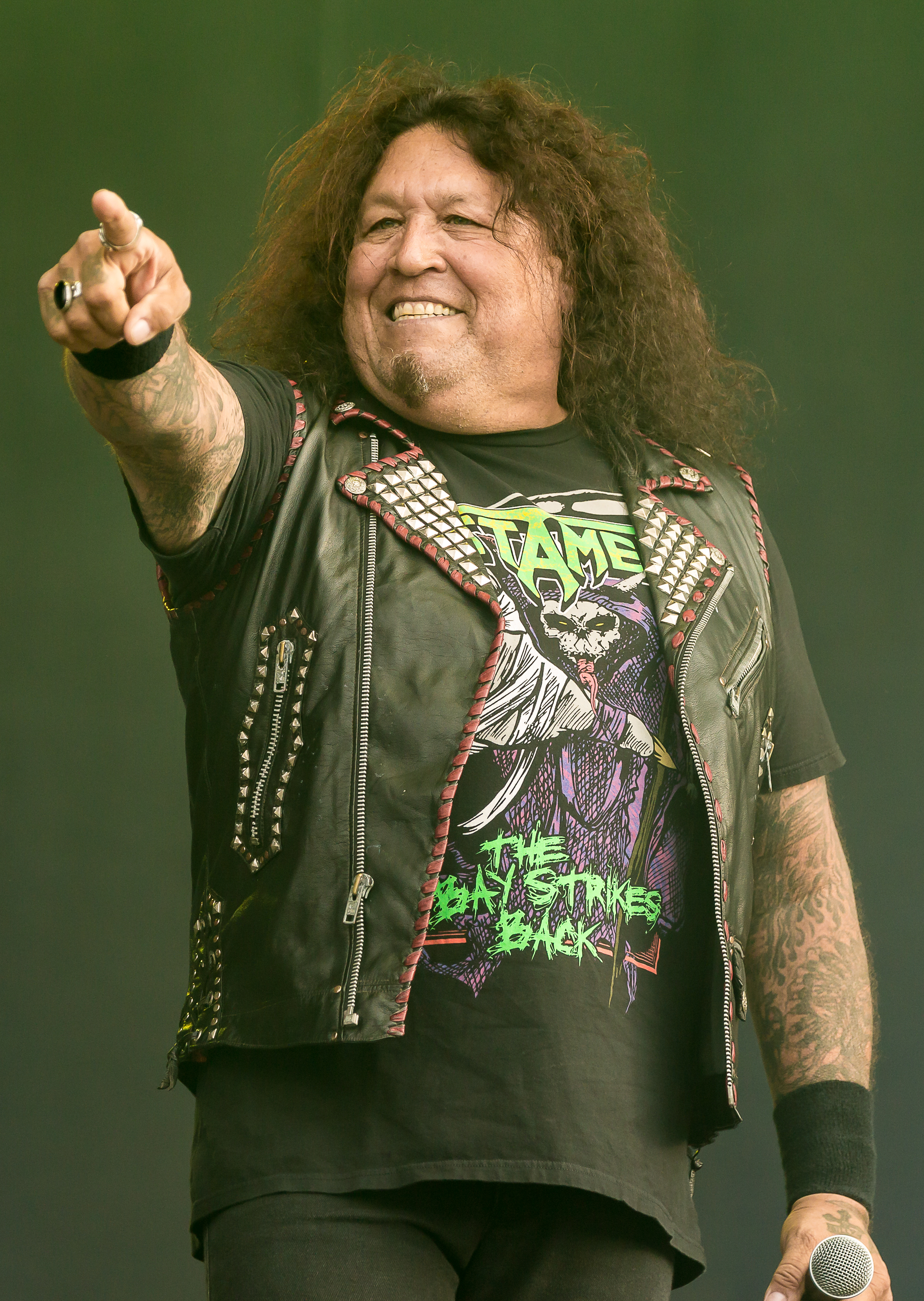
- Billy with Testament in 2022

Background information
- Born: Charles Billy; June 23, 1962 (age 64); Oakland, California, U.S.
- Genres: Thrash metal
- Occupations: Singer; songwriter
- Years active: 1978–present
- Member of: Testament; Dublin Death Patrol

Charles Billy (born June 23, 1962) is an American singer who is best known as the lead vocalist for thrash metal band Testament. Formed in 1982, Testament has become one of the most popular and influential bands of the thrash metal scene. Billy joined the band in 1986, and he and guitarist Eric Peterson are the only members to appear on all of their fourteen studio albums.

== Early life ==
Billy was born to a Native American father and a Mexican mother. He is of the Pomo Native Americans, an indigenous people of Northern California, and is proud of his Native American heritage, sometimes giving a shoutout to his "Native brothers and sisters" in the audience. The song "Trail of Tears" is a tribute to his heritage, as are "Allegiance" and "Native Blood". Billy was born in Oakland, California, he spent the first four years of his life in El Cerrito before his family moved to Dublin, California. He was the middle child of five brothers, his mother worked in a hospital and his father was a repairman for banking office machines.

During his youth Billy would spend a majority of his time riding motorcycles. The first time he performed on stage was in 1982 where he sung for a band called Rampage.

== Career ==
=== Testament ===
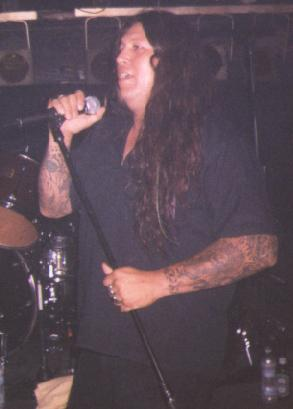
Chuck Billy, c. 1990s

Billy joined Legacy in 1986, replacing vocalist Steve "Zetro" Souza who would later join Exodus. After Legacy changed its name to Testament, the band released their debut album The Legacy in 1987, which featured one song written by Billy entitled "Do or Die". Testament has since released thirteen more studio albums, and toured consistently, including sharing the stage with notable acts such as Iron Maiden, Judas Priest, Black Sabbath, Lamb of God, Devin Townsend, Kiss, Megadeth, Slayer, Anthrax, Exodus, Overkill, Korn, Sepultura, Suicidal Tendencies, Pantera, White Zombie, Primus, D.R.I. and Pro-Pain.

Although Testament's lineup has changed over the years, Billy is one of the two constant members of the band along with guitarist and founder Eric Peterson; they are the only two members of Testament to appear on all of the band's studio albums.

=== Work outside of Testament ===
Prior to Legacy and Testament, Billy was the vocalist for a local metal band called Guilt which also featured future Hericane Alice and Medicine Wheel guitarist Danny Gill. No records by the band exist but they recorded one demo in 1984 and contributed the song "Down to the City" to the U.S. Metal Vol. IV compilation on Shrapnel Records. He also played in high school bands.

Around 1997, Billy auditioned for lead vocals with Sepultura as the replacement for Max Cavalera, but lost that position to Derrick Green.

Billy has also appeared on the solo projects of James Murphy, playing on both albums as a guest musician.

In 2006, Billy provided vocals on the Sadus song "Crazy" and, along with several other musicians from other bands, did a cover of Iron Maiden's "Fear of the Dark" for their Numbers from the Beast tribute album.

He also joined with musicians including his brothers Eddie and Andy Billy, Steve Souza, Greg Bustamante, Steve Robello, Dan Cunningham, Willy Lange to form the band Dublin Death Patrol.

In 2008, Billy was featured as a guest vocalist on "Firehaven" from the album Stormchaser by the Bay Area San Francisco band, Light This City.

In 2008, Billy did the vocals for Silent Night on the album of Christmas carols We Wish You a Metal Xmas and a Headbanging New Year with the likes of Scott Ian, Jon Donais, Chris Wyse and John Tempesta.

In 2009, Billy appeared on the song "Live My Dream" from the band Susperia's album, Attitude.

For the live presentation of the album Ziltoid the Omniscient by Devin Townsend, he provided the voice of the Planet Smasher on the track of the same name. This happened at Tuska Open Air Metal Festival 2010 in Helsinki.

In 2014, Billy provided guest vocals on the song "Trend Killer" on Swedish melodeath band The Haunted's album Exit Wounds.

In 2014, Billy appeared on fellow thrash metal band Exodus's Blood In, Blood Out and provided guest vocals on the track "BTK." He had previously filled in Zetro on vocals for Exodus' performance on October 28, 2004, at the Warfield Theatre in San Francisco, where the band opened for Megadeth.

In 2015, Billy appeared on Metal Allegiance's self-titled album and provided featured vocals on the track "Can't Kill the Devil."

Billy and Jake Oni contributed vocals to the song "The Never" from Lamb of God guitarist Mark Morton's debut solo album Anesthetic, released in March 2019.

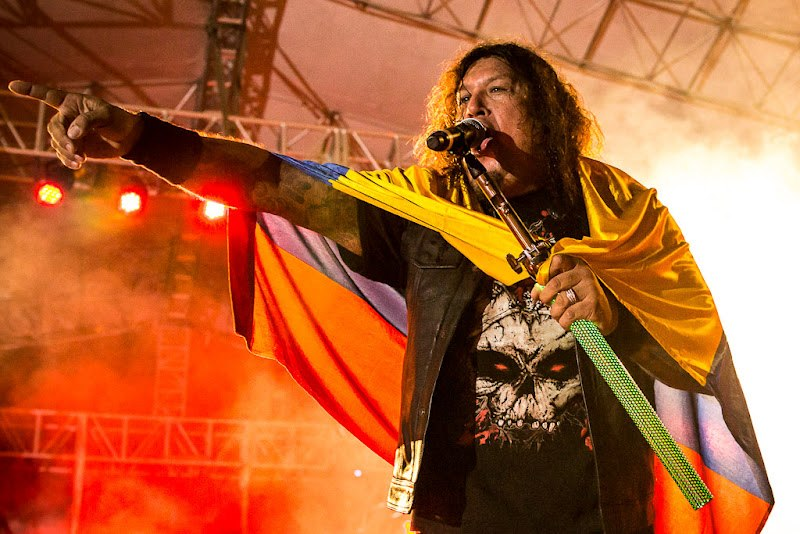
Billy live in 2012

In 2019, Billy appeared as the singer on the song, "Waiting to Die" from the album Imperium by the band Walls of Blood.

In 2019, Billy appeared as a featured artist on the Killswitch Engage song "The Crownless King" from their album Atonement.

In 2020, Billy appeared on the Lamb of God song "Routes" from their self-titled album.

In 2021, Billy provided additional voices for the Disney+ television series "What If...?", part of the Marvel Cinematic Universe.

In 2022, Billy appeared on the Matt Heafy song "Behold Our Power".

In 2022, Billy appeared on deathcore band Shadow of Intent's song "Blood in the Sands of Time" from their Elegy album which was released on January 14.

In an August 2021 interview on The Jasta Show, Billy revealed that he might release a solo album in the future and hinted that its musical direction would be different from the traditional thrash metal style of Testament.

== Influences and vocal style ==
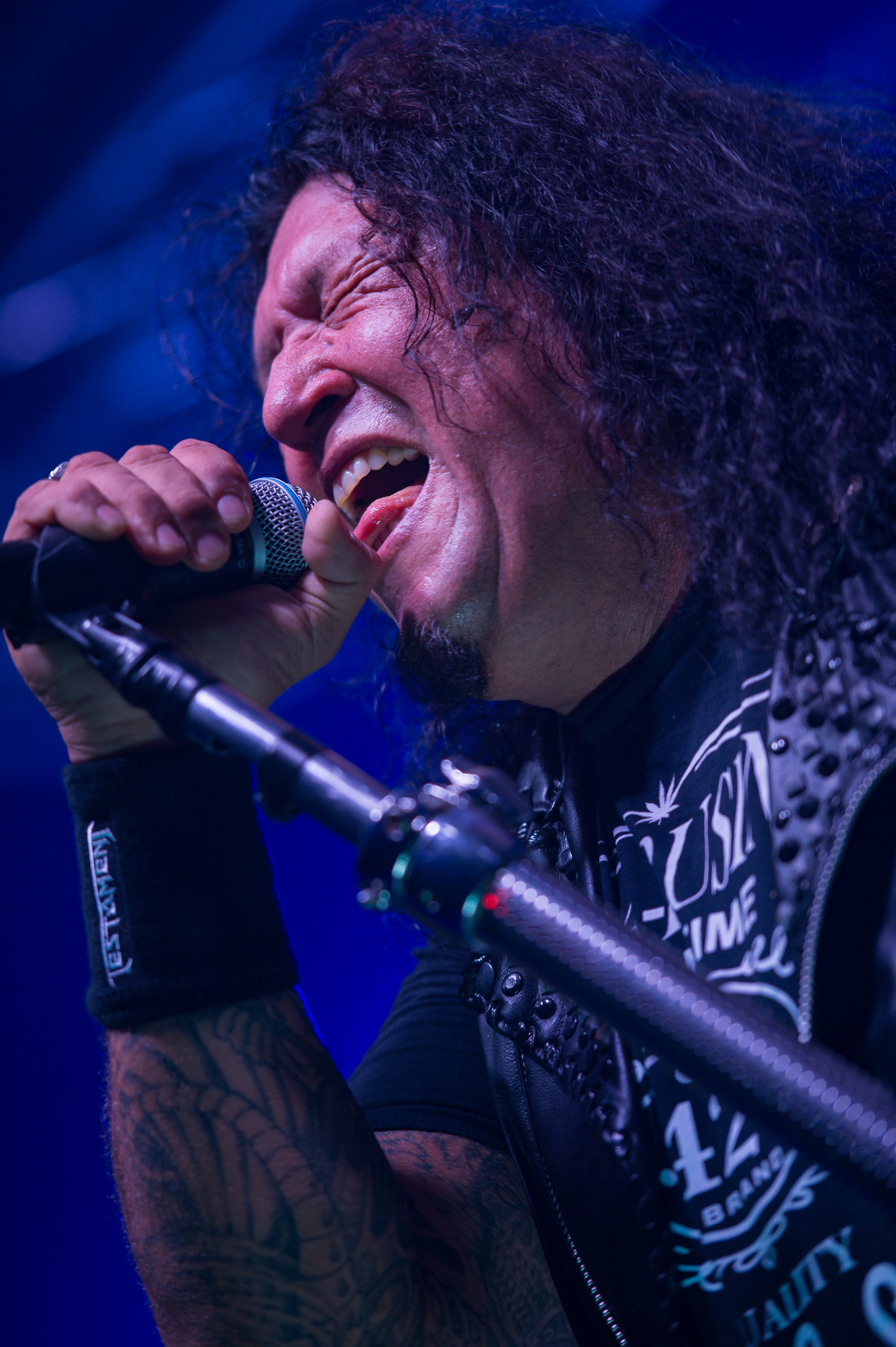
Billy performing in 2017

Billy known for his dynamic vocal abilities, influences reportedly include John Lennon, Paul Stanley, Rob Halford, Ronnie James Dio, Bruce Dickinson, Phil Mogg, James Hetfield, Ozzy Osbourne, Geddy Lee, Bon Scott, Steven Tyler, Alice Cooper, Robert Plant, Phil Lynott and Klaus Meine.

Billy's vocal style has changed considerably over the years from a clear, high-pitched thrash style to a lower register approaching a death grunt. Since the Low album, he has mixed both styles, sometimes within the same song. Billy has stated he uses a Peloton bike to stay in shape and to condition his lungs and diaphragm.

== Awards and honors ==
In 2013, California State Assemblyman Jim Frazier honored Billy on the State Assembly floor for his positive influence on the Native American community.

Billy became the first Native American to be permanently featured in the memorabilia display at the Hard Rock Hotel in Albuquerque, New Mexico, in 2013. He is also recognized in the National Museum of the American Indian exhibit in the Smithsonian Institution titled "Up Where We Belong: Native Musicians in Popular Culture", which was on display through January 2, 2011.

In 2019 Billy and the rest of Testament were inducted into The Metal Hall of Fame.

== Personal life ==
He is married to his wife Tiffany. In his spare time Billy enjoys boating and riding his Harley Davidson.

Billy is first cousins with Stephen Carpenter, co-founder and lead guitarist of alternative metal band Deftones.

In 2001, Billy was diagnosed with germ cell seminoma; his was a rare medical situation since this type of cancer usually manifests in men's testicular region, while in Billy's case the tumor appeared in the chest region near his heart. In August 2001, friends organized the Thrash of the Titans benefit concert, held to raise money for Billy's medical expenses. Following chemotherapy, he has since been given a clean bill of health and continued to work with Testament.

In 2018 Billy partnered with Lord Vapor to launch his own signature vape pen, this partnership later expanded into a series of cannabis-related products branded "The Chief." In 2019 he began studying real estate and flipping houses.

On May 6, 2026, Billy announced he would be releasing his personal memoir Holding My Breath The Two Testaments of Chuck Billy on November 10, 2026. The book will follow his music career and battle with cancer.

== Discography ==
=== Testament ===
- The Legacy (1987)
- The New Order (1988)
- Practice What You Preach (1989)
- Souls of Black (1990)
- The Ritual (1992)
- Low (1994)
- Demonic (1997)
- The Gathering (1999)
- First Strike Still Deadly (2001)
- The Formation of Damnation (2008)
- Dark Roots of Earth (2012)
- Brotherhood of the Snake (2016)
- Titans of Creation (2020)
- Para Bellum (2025)

=== Dublin Death Patrol ===
- DDP 4 Life (2007)
- Death Sentence (2012)

=== Guest appearances ===
- Sadus — "Crazy"
- Light This City — "Firehaven"
- Susperia — "Live My Dream"
- The Haunted — "Trend Killer"
- Exodus — "BTK"
- Metal Alliance — "Can't Kill the Devil"
- Mark Morton — "The Never"
- Walls of Blood — "Waiting to Die"
- Killswitch Engage — "The Crownless King"
- Lamb of God — "Routes"
- Matt Heafy — "Behold Our Power"
- Shadow of Intent — "Blood in the Sands of Time"
