= Alex Skolnick =

American guitarist (born 1968)

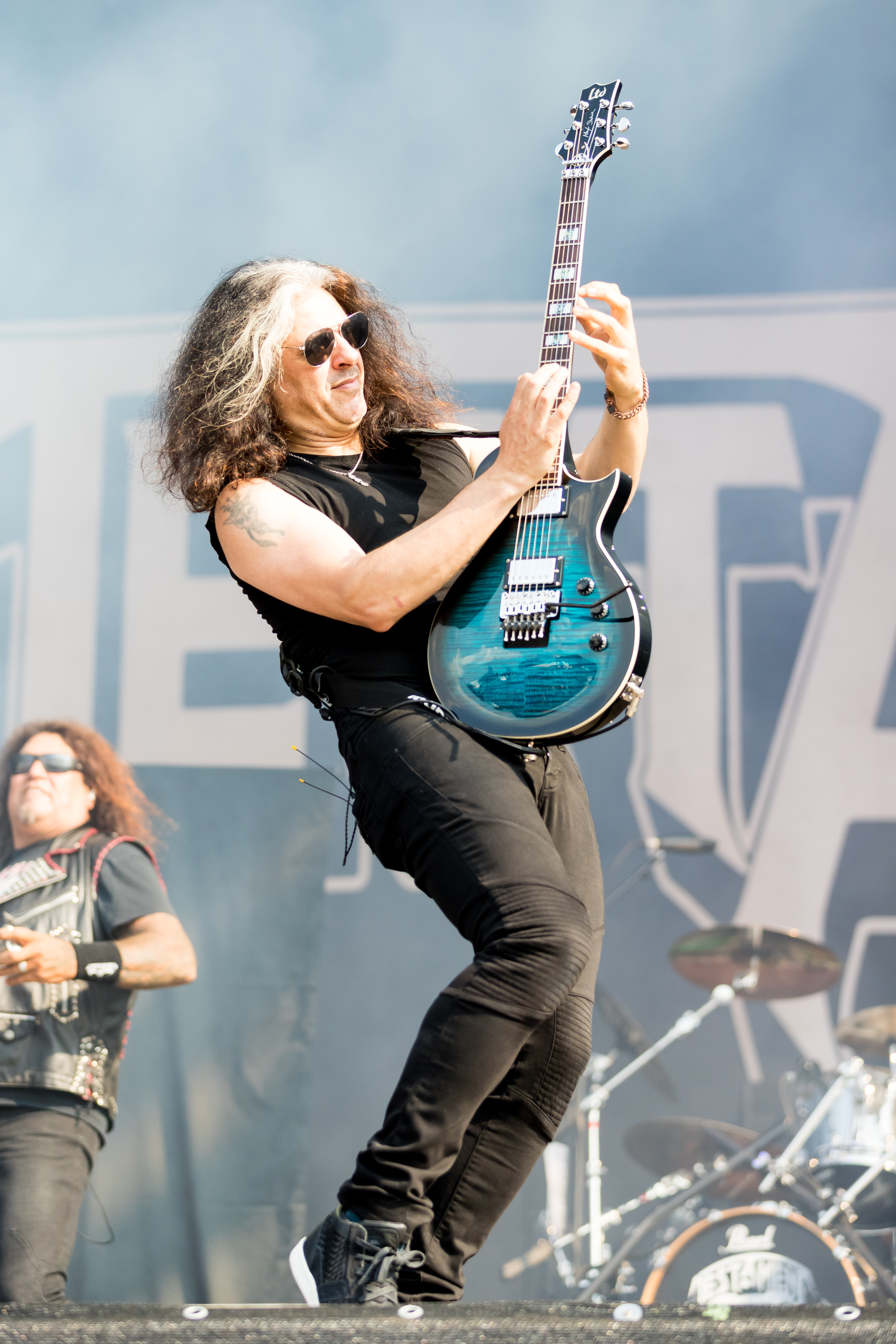
- Skolnick performing with Testament at Wacken, Germany in 2019

Background information
- Born: Alexander Nathan Skolnick; September 29, 1968 (age 58); Berkeley, California, U.S.
- Genres: Thrash metal; jazz rock; heavy metal; progressive metal; hard rock
- Occupation: Guitarist
- Years active: 1983–present
- Member of: Testament; Alex Skolnick Trio; Metal Allegiance; Hu$h Money
- Formerly of: Legacy; Trans-Siberian Orchestra; Savatage; Attention Deficit; Stratospheerius
- Website: alexskolnick.com

Alexander Nathan Skolnick (born September 29, 1968) is an American musician from Berkeley, California. He is best known as the lead guitarist and one of the songwriters of the thrash metal band Testament and has played with several other bands, including The Alex Skolnick Trio, Trans-Siberian Orchestra, Savatage and the heavy metal supergroup Metal Allegiance.

Skolnick began his musical career at the age of 15 when he joined the local Bay Area thrash metal band Legacy, which eventually became Testament, and performed on five albums with them, from The Legacy (1987) to The Ritual (1992). By the time he left Testament in 1992, Skolnick had found considerable fame among the thrash metal and guitar communities; Guitar World magazine named him one of the greatest guitarists of all time, and as one of the "fastest guitarists of all time".

After his first departure from Testament, Skolnick pursued various musical careers, including briefly replacing Criss Oliva in Savatage for their album Handful of Rain (1994) and a short tour, and starting his jazz band The Alex Skolnick Trio in the early 2000s, which remains active as of 2025. He briefly reunited with Testament in 2001 for the re-recordings of their early songs on the album First Strike Still Deadly, and then returned to the band on a permanent basis in 2005, contributing to five more albums.

== Biography ==
=== Early life ===
Skolnick was born and raised in Berkeley, California, in a non-traditional Jewish family. His parents, Jerome Skolnick and Arlene, both PhD graduates from Yale University, taught sociology at New York University and University of California, Berkeley.

=== Career in music ===
==== Testament ====
Skolnick joined the San Francisco Bay Area thrash metal band Testament, then called Legacy, in 1984 as the replacement of original guitarist Derrick Ramirez. Skolnick was eighteen years old when he recorded his debut album with Testament, The Legacy (1987), which received critical acclaim from both music critics and fans alike. The band's next four albums, The New Order (1988), Practice What You Preach (1989), Souls of Black (1990) and The Ritual (1992), cemented Testament's reputation as one of the premier bands of the thrash metal genre and nearly gave them the same level of popularity as the "Big Four" (Metallica, Megadeth, Slayer and Anthrax). In late 1992, several months after the release of The Ritual, Skolnick left the band, citing his weariness of playing thrash metal music and his desire to explore musically outside of Testament as the reasons behind his departure.

Skolnick returned briefly to Testament by re-recording old material for their ninth album, First Strike Still Deadly, as well as the Thrash of the Titans performance in 2001. He officially rejoined the band in 2005 for a short European tour with some American dates appended. A CD/DVD release was put together from the London show of May 8, 2005. On April 29, 2008, Testament released The Formation of Damnation, its first studio album with original material in nine years and with Skolnick in sixteen years. Their next album, Dark Roots of Earth (2012), debuted at No. 12 on the Billboard Top 200 Albums chart, at No.1 on the Billboard Hard Rock and Rock albums chart, and No. 9 on the World Chart. Skolnick has since recorded three more albums with Testament, Brotherhood of the Snake (2016), Titans of Creation (2020) and Para Bellum (2025).

==== Work outside of Testament ====
After his first departure from Testament, Skolnick joined the band Savatage in 1994 for the recording of Handful of Rain, as well as its follow-up live album and home video release Japan Live '94. In 1991 he recorded and toured with the Stuart Hamm band. He also played guitar for Ozzy Osbourne in 1995. In 2004, he made a guest appearance on Lamb of God's Ashes of the Wake album, recording a solo for the album's instrumental title track.

During the mid to late 1990s, Skolnick led several projects in the San Francisco Bay Area, including Skol-Patrol, a funk band featuring Michael Manring that played theme songs from police television shows. He recorded two albums with Attention Deficit, a trio with Manring and Tim Alexander of Primus. In the late 90s, he collaborated with electric violinist Joe Deninzon (who he met in New York City at the New School) in the band Stratospheerius, recording The Adventures of Stratospheerius album. He also appears on their Live Wires album.

In 1998, Skolnick moved to New York City and began devoting all of his energy to jazz. Skolnick traces his interest in jazz to overhearing a recording engineer re-mastering Live at Birdland, a 1964 album by John Coltrane, at the same studio where Testament recorded their third album Practice What You Preach. Skolnick knew Coltrane only by reputation and was fascinated by the album, later recalling: “This whole new world opened up for me.” He enrolled The New School for Jazz & Contemporary Music in 1998, and graduated with a degree in jazz performance. Since 2002, he has toured and recorded as the Alex Skolnick Trio, a jazz group known for rousing bebop renditions of classic rock and heavy metal tunes. The trio has performed at the Rochester International Jazz Festival, Musikmesse Frankfurt, Germany, the National Center for the Arts, Mexico City, and the Iridium Jazz Club in New York City. Skolnick's trio has been praised by Down Beat, Jazziz, and The Village Voice. Their album Veritas (Palmetto) reached No. 7 on the iTunes jazz chart.

Skolnick released a DVD Jazz tuition set with Rock House Method in May 2010. He recorded the album What's Next? with pianist Randy Klein in 2012.

==== World music coalition ====
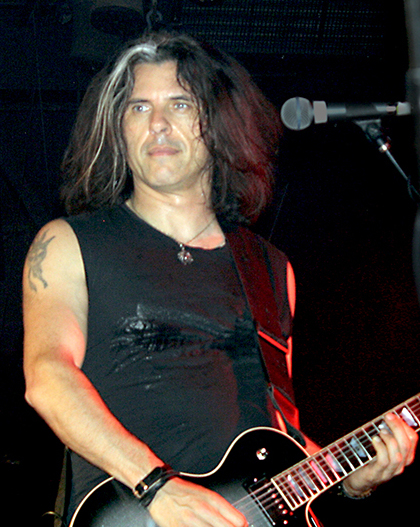
Skolnick in 2011

On June 21, 2012, Summer Solstice Day, Skolnick announced his world music album Planetary Coalition at the annual Make Music New York festival sponsored by Guitar World magazine. He said that he intended to have, "musicians from all over the world, driven by acoustic guitar and bringing together inspirational melodies, in-depth improvisation and the passion of the musical styles of Gypsy, Middle Eastern, Indian, Latin, East Asian, Mediterranean, Balkan/Eastern European, African and other indigenous lands – Planetary Coalition has been guided by a single hope: that by weaving the threads that connect musical expressions with regional identities, we can bridge the gap between diverse cultures and people, and increase awareness of the ecological and social issues facing the planet, our island in the sky."

Planetary Coalition was released by ArtistShare on November 11, 2014 to commemorate the centennial of the end of the First World War. The album gathered over twenty musicians from five continents, including Indo-Canadian ghazal singer Kiran Ahluwalia, Argentine bassist Pablo Aslan, Chinese pipa player Yihan Chen, American violinist Rachel Golub, Cuban drummer Horacio Hernández, Albanian accordionist Raif Hyseni, Palestinian oud player Adnan Joubran, Turkish kanun player Tamer Pinarbasi, Mexican guitar duo Rodrigo y Gabriela, Israeli percussionist Gadi Seri, and Yacouba Sissoko, a kora player from Mali.

The project endeavored to combine artistic, ecological, political, and social issues, as well as showcase the landscape and architecture of other countries. Maddy Samaddar Johnson, an architect and urban planner, was hired as a consultant.

Skolnick used a variety of guitars, including steel string, nylon string, acoustic, and electric. All compositions were by Skolnick, except two which were composed by Skolnick-Joubran and Skolnick-Hernandez. The tune from Mali and from China were first-time guitar-kora and guitar-pipa duos of traditional songs from those regions.

The album was praised by many publications, newspapers, and blogs. Guitar World magazine chose Planetary Coalition as one among the top 50 albums of 2014 and among the top 10 acoustic guitar albums of the year.

=== Career in art and literature ===
Skolnick's memoir, Geek to Guitar Hero, was published in January 2013 and received positive reviews from Anthony Bozza, Bradford Morrow, Ned Vizzini, and Brad Tolinski, editor in chief of Guitar World.

He has been active in blending music with works of art and literature. In 2007, he contributed a solo for Egyptian artist Nader Sadek's project, "Faceless". The song was only to be heard in an art gallery in New York. In 2012, he performed live at the Feature Inc Gallery in New York, for a musical interpretation project for the works of visual artist Douglas Melini.

== Equipment ==
Skolnick plays electric ESP Guitars and Godin hollow-bodied models with Seymour Duncan pickups. He formerly played Heritage and Ibanez guitars.

In 2009 Heritage released Alex's first signature guitar. His signature is a solid body based upon the H 150/157 model. In his early years with Testament he endorsed Ibanez guitars and mainly played the short lived 540P second generation Power series models, and later the 540SLTD Saber model. Throughout his days with Savatage he used the RV470 Radius model and an LA Custom Shop prototype based on the Ghostrider series. Alex endorsed Charvel guitars and was featured in their ads around 1995. For amplification, he uses Budda amps and several Marshall amps including the discontinued Marshall Mode Four hybrid amps.

In 2013, Budda released a signature amp for Skolnick, called the Preceptor, and later in the same year it was announced that Skolnick was signed to ESP guitars, with an ESP and LTD model in the works for 2014.

== Influences ==
Skolnick's influences include Frank Zappa, Eddie Van Halen, Jeff Beck, Jimi Hendrix, Eric Clapton, Johnny Winter, Randy Rhoads, Michael Schenker, Yngwie Malmsteen, Kiss, and Scorpions. He was a student of guitarist Joe Satriani. Skolnick also enjoys jazz, saying his discovery of the genre invigorated his playing after feeling he'd reached a creative dead-end with metal, and lists albums by Joe Henderson, Larry Young and Chick Corea among his favorites.

== Discography ==
Year	Artist	Album	Notes
1987	Testament	The Legacy	
1988	Testament	The New Order	
1989	Testament	Practice What You Preach	
1990	Testament	Souls of Black	
1992	Testament	The Ritual	
1994	Savatage	Handful of Rain	
1994	Michael Manring	Thonk	Guitar on "Disturbed" and "Cruel and Unusual"
1995	Savatage	Japan Live '94	
1997	The Skol-Patrol	Skol-Patrol	
1998	Attention Deficit	Attention Deficit	
2001	Attention Deficit	The Idiot King	
2001	Testament	First Strike Still Deadly	
2002	Alex Skolnick Trio	Goodbye to Romance: Standards for a New Generation	
2002	Stratospheerius	Adventures of Stratospheerius	
2004	Alex Skolnick Trio	Transformation	
2004	Lamb of God	Ashes of the Wake	Second solo on "Ashes of the Wake"
2004	Stratospheerius	Live Wires	Guitar on "Contusion" and "Shock Therapy"
2005	Ofri Eliaz	Ya salio de la mar – Ladino Songs	Co-production, guitars
2005	Numbers from the Beast	An All Star Salute to Iron Maiden	Lead guitar on "Wrathchild"
2007	Alex Skolnick Trio	Last Day in Paradise	
2008	Testament	The Formation of Damnation	
2011	Alex Skolnick Trio	Veritas	
2012	Testament	Dark Roots of Earth	
2014	Alex Skolnick & various artists	Planetary Coalition	
2015	Metal Allegiance	Metal Allegiance	
2016	Testament	Brotherhood of the Snake	
2018	Metal Allegiance	Volume II: Power Drunk Majesty	
2018	Alex Skolnick Trio	Conundrum	
2020	Testament	Titans of Creation	
2020	Azusa	Loop of Yesterdays	Lead guitar on "Detach"
2024	PAKT	No Steps Left To Trace	
2025	Testament	Para Bellum	
2025	Alex Skolnick Trio	Prove You're Not A Robot	

== Awards and nominations ==
Year	Award	Category	Result
2012	Loudwire Music Awards	Best Guitarist	Nominated
2017	Loudwire Music Awards	Best Guitarist (shared with Eric Peterson)	Nominated
2019	The Metal Hall of Fame	As a member of Testament	Inducted
