= List of Testament members =

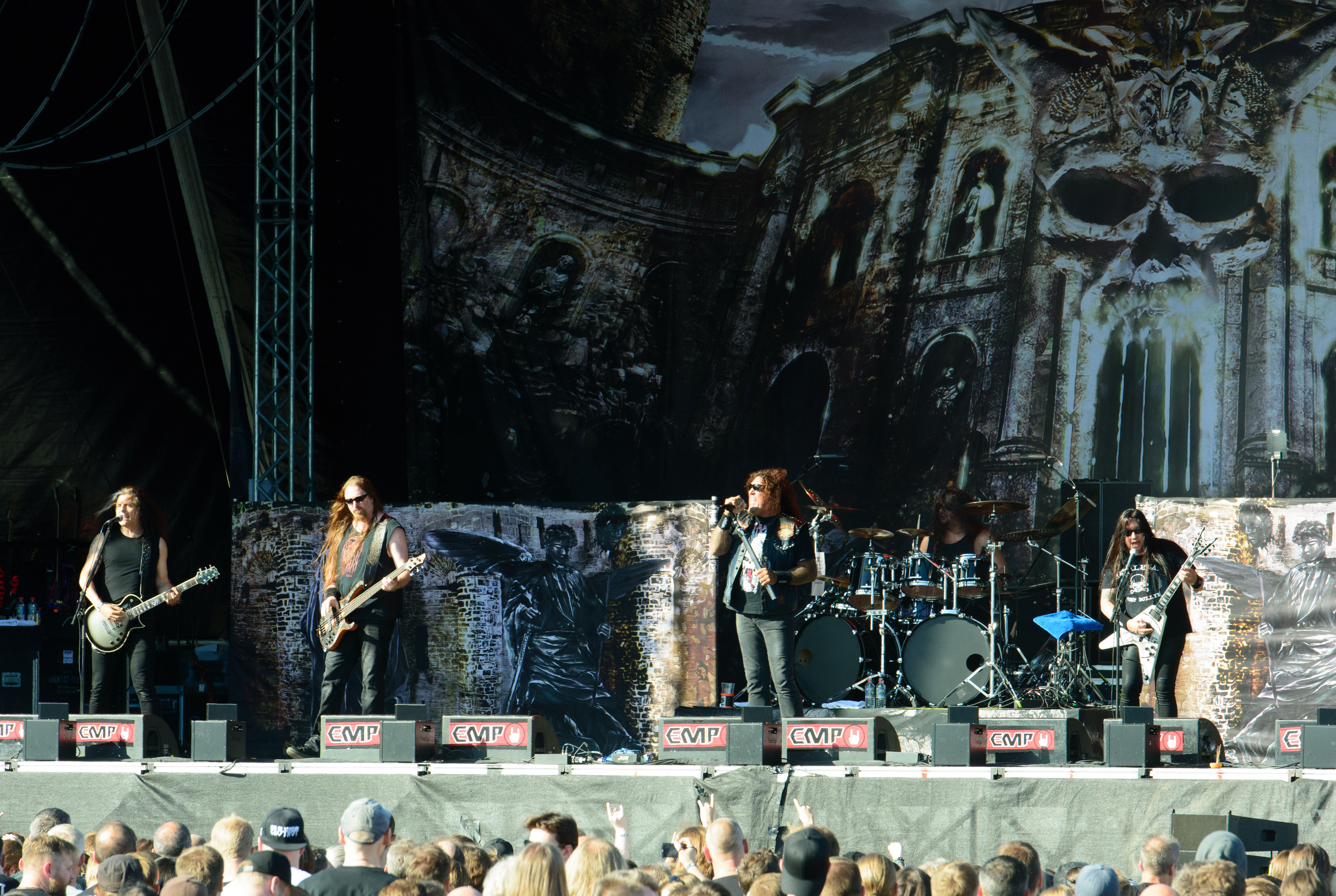
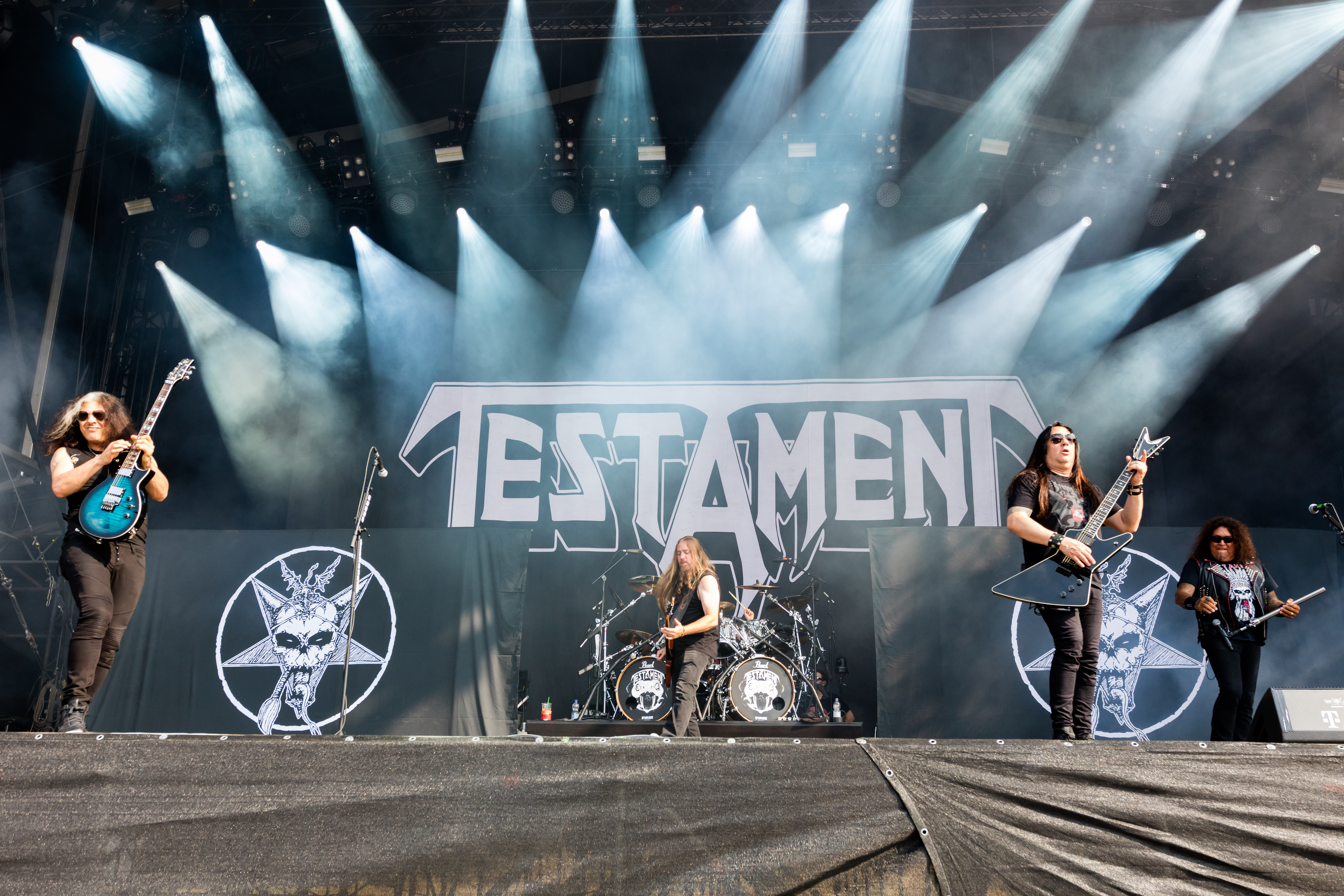
Testament in 2016 (top) and 2019 (bottom)

Testament is an American thrash metal band from Berkeley, California. Formed in 1983, the group originally consisted of guitarists Eric Peterson and Derrick Ramirez, bassist Greg Christian, drummer Louie Clemente and lead vocalist Steve "Zetro" Souza. The band's current lineup features Peterson, lead vocalist Chuck Billy (since 1986), lead guitarist Alex Skolnick (from 1983 to 1992, and since 2005), bassist Steve Di Giorgio (from 1998 to 2005, and since 2014) and drummer Chris Dovas (since 2023).

== History ==
=== 1983–1997 ===
Formed under the name Legacy in 1983 by cousins Eric Peterson (rhythm guitar, backing vocals) and Derrick Ramirez (lead guitar, lead vocals), the original lineup of the group also featured bassist Greg Christian, drummer Louie Clemente, and (after Ramirez decided that he wanted to focus on guitar only) lead vocalist Steve "Zetro" Souza. Clemente left the band in 1985 and was replaced by Mike Ronchette. Ramirez departed soon after and was replaced by Alex Skolnick. This lineup recorded a four-song demo in 1985. Souza left to join Exodus in 1986 and was replaced by Chuck Billy, who the departing vocalist had suggested for his replacement. Drummer Clemente returned to the band in 1986.

Also in 1986, the band was signed by Megaforce Records and subsequently changed its name to Testament, due to another band using the name Legacy. The group's lineup remained stable until October 1992, when Skolnick left due to musical differences and was replaced by Glen Alvelais, formerly of Forbidden. Clemente also left at the same time, with his place taken by Forbidden drummer Paul Bostaph. By April the following year, Bostaph had been replaced by former Exodus drummer John Tempesta, and by early 1994 Alvelais' lead guitarist role had been taken over by James Murphy.

After recording the band's sixth studio album Low, Tempesta left Testament to join White Zombie, with Jon Dette taking his place. The new drummer also left after a year, reportedly following a disagreement with vocalist Billy, subsequently joining Slayer. He was replaced briefly by Chris Kontos, formerly of Machine Head, who recorded a cover version of Judas Priest's "Rapid Fire" for the tribute album A Tribute to Judas Priest: Legends of Metal, Vol. 1 before leaving again. By 1996, only Billy and Peterson remained members of Testament, as Murphy, Christian and Kontos had all departed.

=== 1997–2011 ===
In 1997, Testament returned with Demonic, which featured a lineup of vocalist Chuck Billy and guitarist Eric Peterson, alongside original guitarist Derrick Ramirez on bass and Gene Hoglan on drums. For the album's touring cycle, the band was rejoined by guitarist Glen Alvelais and drummer Jon Dette. In 1998, the group recorded The Gathering with returning lead guitarist James Murphy, former Death bassist Steve Di Giorgio and former Slayer drummer Dave Lombardo. For the album's promotional tour, Murphy and Lombardo were replaced by Steve Smyth and Steve Jacobs, respectively.

Jon Allen took over from Jacobs in early 2000. The following year, Billy, Peterson and Di Giorgio released First Strike Still Deadly, a collection of early songs re-recorded with former guitarist Alex Skolnick and drummer John Tempesta, as well as early vocalist Steve "Zetro" Souza on two tracks. After several temporary breaks from the group due to family issues, Allen left Testament in February 2004 and was replaced by the returning Paul Bostaph. Just two months later, Smyth also left to join Nevermore and was replaced by former Halford guitarist "Metal" Mike Chlasciak.

In February 2005, it was announced that Billy and Peterson would be reuniting with Skolnick, bassist Greg Christian, and drummers Louie Clemente and John Tempesta for a European tour. In summer 2006, Clemente was forced to leave the tour for medical reasons, with Bostaph returning again to take his place as the sole drummer. By the end of the year, Nick Barker had taken over on drums. In October 2007, Bostaph returned to Testament for his fourth tenure in the group, who released their first album of new material in eight years, The Formation of Damnation, in 2008.

=== Since 2011 ===
In June 2011, Gene Hoglan returned to Testament in time for the recording of Dark Roots of Earth, which was released the next year. In January 2014, Christian was replaced by Steve Di Giorgio. The lineup of Billy, Peterson, Skolnick, Hoglan and Di Giorgio recorded two albums, Brotherhood of the Snake (2016) and Titans of Creation (2020), before Hoglan once again left the band in January 2022. Nearly two months later, he was replaced by The Gathering-era drummer Dave Lombardo, who rejoined Testament right before the band's US tour in support of Titans of Creation. In 2023, Dave Lombardo was replaced by current drummer Chris Dovas.

== Members ==
=== Current ===
Image	Name	Years active	Instruments	Release contributions
	Eric Peterson	1983–present	rhythm and lead guitar; backing vocals	all Testament releases
	Alex Skolnick	1985–1992; 2005–present	lead and rhythm guitar; backing vocals	all Testament releases from the Legacy Demo (1985) to Return to the Apocalyptic City (1993) – features on two tracks only, and from First Strike Still Deadly (2001) onwards
	Chuck Billy	1986–present	lead vocals	all Testament releases from The Legacy (1987) onwards
	Steve Di Giorgio	1998–2005; 2014–present	bass; backing vocals	The Gathering (1999); First Strike Still Deadly (2001); Brotherhood of the Snake (2016); Titans of Creation (2020); Para Bellum (2025)
	Chris Dovas	2022 (substitute); 2023–present	drums	Para Bellum (2025)

=== Former ===
Image	Name	Years active	Instruments	Release contributions
	Greg Christian	1983–1996; 2005–2014	bass; backing vocals	all Testament releases from the Legacy Demo (1985) to "Rapid Fire" (1997), and from Live in London (2005) to Dark Roots of Thrash (2013)
	Louie Clemente	1983–1985; 1986–1992; 2005–2006	drums	all Testament releases from The Legacy (1987) to Return to the Apocalyptic City (1993) – two tracks only; Live in London (2005)
	Derrick Ramirez	1983–1985; 1996–1998	lead vocals (1983); lead guitar (1983–1985); bass (1996–1998)	Demonic (1997)
	Steve "Zetro" Souza	1983–1986	lead vocals	Legacy Demo (1985); First Strike Still Deadly (2001) – guest appearances on two tracks; The Formation of Damnation (2008)
	Mike Ronchette	1985–1986	drums	Legacy Demo (1985)
	Glen Alvelais	1992–1994; 1997–1998	lead and rhythm guitar	Return to the Apocalyptic City (1993); Demonic (1997) – one track only
	Paul Bostaph	1992–1993; 2004–2005; 2006; 2007–2011	drums	Return to the Apocalyptic City (1993); The Formation of Damnation (2008)
	John Tempesta	1993–1994; 2003 (touring); 2005–2006	drums	Low (1994); First Strike Still Deadly (2001); Live in London (2005)
	James Murphy	1994–1996; 1998–1999	lead and rhythm guitar	Low (1994); Live at the Fillmore (1995); "Rapid Fire" (1997); The Gathering (1999)
	Jon Dette	1994–1995; 1997–1998	drums	Live at the Fillmore (1995)
	Chris Kontos	1995–1996	drums	"Rapid Fire" (1997)
	Gene Hoglan	1996–1997; 2011–2022	drums	Demonic (1997); all Testament releases from Dark Roots of Earth (2012) to Titans of Creation (2020)
	Dave Lombardo	1998–1999; 2022–2023	drums	The Gathering (1999)
	Steve Smyth	1999–2004	lead and rhythm guitar	none
	Steve Jacobs	1999–2000	drums	none
	Jon Allen	2000–2004	drums	none
	Nick Barker	2006–2007	drums	none

=== Touring ===
Image	Name	Years active	Instruments	Notes
	Asgeir Mickelson	2003	drums	Mickelson substituted for Allen for a European tour, due to his ongoing "personal family issues".
	"Metal" Mike Chlasciak	2004–2005	lead and rhythm guitar	Chlasciak substituted following the release of Steve Smyth of his duties, thus filled the remaining touring obligations of the following year.
	Glen Drover	2008; 2010	lead and rhythm guitar	Drover substituted for Skolnick on a Mexican tour in 2008, and for a North American tour in 2010.
	Mark Hernandez	2012	drums	Hernandez filled in for Hoglan on a European tour in November and December 2012.
	Jack Gibson	2013	bass	Gibson filled in for Christian on a North American tour in November 2013.
	Tilen Hudrap	2015	bass	Hudrap and Bent replaced DiGiorgio and Hoglan respectively in 2015.
	Alex Bent	2015	drums	Hudrap and Bent replaced DiGiorgio and Hoglan respectively in 2015.
	Phil Demmel	2023	lead and rhythm guitar	Demmel replaced Skolnick for part of the bands 2023 European tour.

== Lineups ==
Period	Members	Releases
Early 1983 – late 1983 (as Legacy)	Eric Peterson – rhythm guitar, backing vocals; Derrick Ramirez – lead guitar, lead vocals; Greg Christian – bass; Louie Clemente – drums	none
Late 1983 – 1985 (as Legacy)	Eric Peterson – rhythm guitar, backing vocals; Derrick Ramirez – lead guitar; Greg Christian – bass; Louie Clemente – drums; Steve Souza – lead vocals	none
1985 (as Legacy)	Eric Peterson – rhythm guitar, backing vocals; Greg Christian – bass; Steve Souza – lead vocals; Mike Ronchette – drums; Alex Skolnick – lead guitar, backing vocals	Legacy Demo (1985)
1986 – October 1992 (as Legacy until 1987)	Eric Peterson – rhythm guitar, backing vocals; Greg Christian – bass; Alex Skolnick – lead guitar, backing vocals; Louie Clemente – drums; Chuck Billy – lead vocals	The Legacy (1987); Live at Eindhoven (1987); The New Order (1988); Practice What You Preach (1989); Souls of Black (1990); The Ritual (1992)
November 1992 – April 1993	Eric Peterson – rhythm guitar, backing vocals; Greg Christian – bass; Chuck Billy – lead vocals; Glen Alvelais – lead guitar; Paul Bostaph – drums	Return to the Apocalyptic City (1993)
April 1993 – early 1994	Eric Peterson – rhythm guitar, backing vocals; Greg Christian – bass; Chuck Billy – lead vocals; Glen Alvelais – lead guitar; John Tempesta – drums	none
Early – September 1994	Eric Peterson – rhythm guitar, backing vocals; Greg Christian – bass; Chuck Billy – lead vocals; John Tempesta – drums; James Murphy – lead guitar	Low (1994)
September 1994 – 1995	Eric Peterson – rhythm guitar, backing vocals; Greg Christian – bass; Chuck Billy – lead vocals; James Murphy – lead guitar; Jon Dette – drums	Live at the Fillmore (1995)
1995–1996	Eric Peterson – rhythm guitar, backing vocals; Greg Christian – bass; Chuck Billy – lead vocals; James Murphy – lead guitar; Chris Kontos – drums	Rapid Fire (1997)
Late 1996 – early 1997	Eric Peterson – guitars, backing vocals; Chuck Billy – lead vocals; Derrick Ramirez – bass; Gene Hoglan – drums	Demonic (1997)
Spring 1997 – spring 1998	Eric Peterson – rhythm guitar, backing vocals; Chuck Billy – lead vocals; Derrick Ramirez – bass; Glen Alvelais – lead and rhythm guitar; Jon Dette – drums	Demonic (1997) one track only
Spring 1998 – summer 1999	Eric Peterson – rhythm guitar, backing vocals; Chuck Billy – lead vocals; James Murphy – lead guitar; Steve Di Giorgio – bass, backing vocals; Dave Lombardo – drums	The Gathering (1999)
Summer 1999 – early 2000	Eric Peterson – rhythm guitar, backing vocals; Chuck Billy – lead vocals; Steve Di Giorgio – bass, backing vocals; Steve Smyth – lead guitar; Steve Jacobs – drums	none
Early 2000 – February 2004	Eric Peterson – rhythm guitar, backing vocals; Chuck Billy – lead vocals; Steve Di Giorgio – bass, backing vocals; Steve Smyth – lead guitar; Jon Allen – drums	First Strike Still Deadly (2001) (does not feature Smyth or Allen)
February – April 2004	Eric Peterson – rhythm guitar, backing vocals; Chuck Billy – lead vocals; Steve Di Giorgio – bass, backing vocals; Steve Smyth – lead guitar; Paul Bostaph – drums	none
April 2004 – March 2005	Eric Peterson – rhythm guitar, backing vocals; Chuck Billy – lead vocals; Steve Di Giorgio – bass, backing vocals; Paul Bostaph – drums; Mike Chlasciak – lead guitar	none
March 2005 – July 2006	Eric Peterson – rhythm guitar, backing vocals; Chuck Billy – lead vocals; Greg Christian – bass; Alex Skolnick – lead guitar, backing vocals; John Tempesta – drums; Louie Clemente – drums	Live in London (2005)
July – late 2006	Eric Peterson – rhythm and lead guitar, backing vocals; Chuck Billy – lead vocals; Greg Christian – bass; Alex Skolnick – lead and rhythm guitar, backing vocals; Paul Bostaph – drums	none
Late 2006 – October 2007	Eric Peterson – rhythm guitar, backing vocals; Chuck Billy – lead vocals; Greg Christian – bass; Alex Skolnick – lead guitar, backing vocals; Nick Barker – drums	none
October 2007 – June 2011	Eric Peterson – rhythm guitar, backing vocals; Chuck Billy – lead vocals; Greg Christian – bass; Alex Skolnick – lead guitar, backing vocals; Paul Bostaph – drums	The Formation of Damnation (2008)
June 2011 – January 2014	Eric Peterson – rhythm and lead guitar, backing vocals; Chuck Billy – lead vocals; Greg Christian – bass; Alex Skolnick – lead and rhythm guitar, backing vocals; Gene Hoglan – drums	Dark Roots of Earth (2012); Dark Roots of Thrash (2013)
January 2014 – February 2022	Eric Peterson – rhythm guitar, backing vocals; Chuck Billy – lead vocals; Alex Skolnick – lead guitar, backing vocals; Gene Hoglan – drums; Steve Di Giorgio – bass, backing vocals	Brotherhood of the Snake (2016); Titans of Creation (2020)
March 2022 – June 2023	Eric Peterson – rhythm guitar, backing vocals; Chuck Billy – lead vocals; Alex Skolnick – lead guitar, backing vocals; Steve Di Giorgio – bass, backing vocals; Dave Lombardo – drums	none
July 2023 – Present	Eric Peterson – rhythm guitar, backing vocals; Chuck Billy – lead vocals; Alex Skolnick – lead guitar, backing vocals; Steve Di Giorgio – bass, backing vocals; Chris Dovas – drums	Para Bellum (2025)
