= Days of Darkness (album) =

Compilation album by Testament
- Released: August 24, 2004
- Genre: Thrash metal; death metal
- Length: 1:37:08
- Label: Spitfire

Testament chronology
First Strike Still Deadly (2001)	Days of Darkness (2004)	Live in London (2005)

Professional ratings
Review scores
Source	Rating
Allmusic	3/5 stars

Days of Darkness is a compilation double CD released by Spitfire Records. The first CD is composed of tracks from Testament's Demonic and The Gathering. The second CD is the entire First Strike Still Deadly album.

== Track listing ==
Disc one
No.	Title	Lyrics	Music	Original album	Length
1.	"Hatred's Rise"	Chuck Billy	Eric Peterson	Demonic	3:17
2.	"John Doe"	Billy	Peterson	Demonic	3:13
3.	"Riding the Snake"	Billy	Billy, Peterson	The Gathering	4:15
4.	"Down for Life"	Billy	Billy, Peterson	The Gathering	3:24
5.	"Demonic Refusal"	Billy	Peterson, Derrick Ramirez	Demonic	5:23
6.	"The Burning Times"	Billy	Peterson, Ramirez	Demonic	5:17
7.	"Ten Thousand Thrones"	Billy	Peterson	Demonic	4:36
8.	"D.N.R. (Do Not Resuscitate"	Billy	Billy, Peterson	The Gathering	3:33
9.	"3 Days in Darkness"	Billy	Billy, Del James, Peterson	The Gathering	4:43
10.	"Together As One"	Billy	Peterson	Demonic	4:19
11.	"Legions of the Dead"	Billy	Peterson	The Gathering	2:38
12.	"Fall of Sipledome"	Billy	Billy, Peterson	The Gathering	4:48
Total length:					48:28

Disc two
No.	Title	Lyrics	Music	Original album	Length
1.	"First Strike is Deadly"	Steve Souza, Greg Christian	Alex Skolnick, Eric Peterson	The Legacy	4:00
2.	"Into the Pit"	Chuck Billy, Skolnick, Peterson	Skolnick, Peterson	The New Order	2:54
3.	"Trial by Fire"	Billy, Skolnick, Peterson	Skolnick, Peterson	The New Order	4:33
4.	"Disciples of the Watch"	Billy	Skolnick, Peterson	The New Order	4:34
5.	"The Preacher"	Billy, Skolnick	Skolnick, Peterson	The New Order	3:56
6.	"Burnt Offerings"	Souza, Peterson	Skolnick, Peterson	The Legacy	5:28
7.	"Over the Wall"	Souza	Skolnick, Peterson, Christian	The Legacy	4:18
8.	"The New Order"	Skolnick, Peterson	Skolnick, Peterson	The New Order	4:43
9.	"The Haunting"	Souza, Peterson	Skolnick, Peterson	The Legacy	4:37
10.	"Alone in the Dark"	Souza	Skolnick, Peterson	The Legacy	4:40
11.	"Reign of Terror"	Souza, Derrick Ramirez, Peterson	Ramirez, Peterson	Demo 1	5:06
Total length:					48:40
