= The Very Best of Testament =

Greatest hits album by Testament
- Released: September 4, 2001
- Recorded: 1986–1994
- Genre: Thrash metal; heavy metal
- Length: 1:10:56
- Label: Rhino

Testament chronology
The Gathering (1999)	The Very Best of Testament (2001)	First Strike Still Deadly (2001)

Professional ratings
Review scores
Source	Rating
AllMusic	4.5/5 stars

The Very Best of Testament is a compilation album by Testament, released in 2001. Like their previous two compilation albums The Best of Testament and Signs of Chaos, this one covers material from the band's tenure with Atlantic Records, though it omits any songs from Souls of Black. Also included on this compilation album is a live version of "Over the Wall" from the Return to the Apocalyptic City EP.

== Track listing ==
1. "The Haunting" (from The Legacy)
2. "Burnt Offerings" (The Legacy)
3. "First Strike Is Deadly" (The Legacy)
4. "The New Order" (The New Order)
5. "Into the Pit" (The New Order)
6. "Disciples of the Watch" (The New Order)
7. "Practice What You Preach" (Practice What You Preach)
8. "Greenhouse Effect" (Practice What You Preach)
9. "Signs of Chaos" (The Ritual)
10. "Electric Crown" (The Ritual)
11. "So Many Lies" (The Ritual)
12. "The Ritual" (The Ritual)
13. "Return to Serenity" (The Ritual)
14. "Over the Wall" (Live) (Return to the Apocalyptic City)
15. "Dog Faced Gods" (Low)
