= Days of Darkness =

Days of Darkness may refer to

- Days of Darkness (2007 American film), a 2007 American horror film
- Days of Darkness (2007 Canadian film), a 2007 Quebec film by Denys Arcand
- Days of Darkness (album), an album by Testament
