= Signs of Chaos: The Best of Testament =

Greatest hits album by Testament
- Released: November 4, 1997
- Recorded: 1986–1997
- Genre: Thrash metal; groove metal; heavy metal
- Length: 74:51
- Label: Mayhem/Fierce

Testament chronology
Demonic (1997)	Signs of Chaos: The Best of Testament (1997)	The Gathering (1999)

Signs of Chaos: The Best of Testament is a compilation album by Testament, released in 1997. Similar to their next collection The Very Best of Testament, it not only includes tracks from the band's tenure with Atlantic Records, but also two non-album tracks which are covers of Scorpions' "The Sails of Charon" and Aerosmith's "Draw the Line"; they were both released as B-sides on the 1994 CD single "Dog Faced Gods". Also included on this compilation album is "Demonic Refusal", a track from their then-latest album Demonic.

Professional ratings
Review scores
Source	Rating
AllMusic	4.5/5 stars

== Track listing ==
1. "Signs of Chaos"
2. "Electric Crown"
3. "The New Order"
4. "Alone in the Dark"
5. "Dog Faced Gods"
6. "Demonic Refusal"
7. "The Ballad"
8. "Souls of Black"
9. "Trial by Fire"
10. "Low"
11. "Practice What You Preach"
12. "Over the Wall"
13. "The Legacy"
14. "Return to Serenity"
15. "Perilous Nation"
16. "The Sails of Charon" (Ulrich Roth)
17. "Draw the Line" (Steven Tyler, Joe Perry)
