= Live at the Fillmore (Testament album) =

Live album by Testament
- Released: July 18, 1995
- Recorded: April 22, 1995
- Venue: The Fillmore, San Francisco, California
- Genre: Thrash metal; heavy metal; groove metal
- Length: 75:02
- Label: Burnt Offerings; Prosthetic (2011)
- Producer: Michael Wagener

Testament chronology
Low (1994)	Live at the Fillmore (1995)	Demonic (1997)

Professional ratings
Review scores
Source	Rating
AllMusic	3/5 stars
Collector's Guide to Heavy Metal	7/10

Live at the Fillmore is a live album by the American thrash metal band Testament. It was released in 1995 on Spitfire Records. The first fourteen tracks are live recordings and the last three are semi-acoustic versions of previously released songs. As of December 1999, Live at the Fillmore sold over 32,500 copies in the U.S.

== Track listing ==
1. "The Preacher" – 4:20
2. "Alone in the Dark" – 4:36
3. "Burnt Offerings" – 5:14
4. "A Dirge" – 2:03
5. "Eerie Inhabitants" – 3:50
6. "The New Order" – 4:31
7. "Low" – 3:13
8. "Urotsukidoji" – 3:47
9. "Into the Pit" – 2:54
10. "Souls of Black" – 3:39
11. "Practice What You Preach" – 4:59
12. "Apocalyptic City" – 5:58
13. "Hail Mary" – 3:45
14. "Dog Faced Gods" – 4:46
15. "Return to Serenity (Acoustic)" – 5:55
16. "The Legacy (Acoustic)" – 5:16
17. "Trail of Tears (Acoustic)" – 6:16

The Japanese edition drops the acoustic version of "The Legacy" and includes "All I Could Bleed" as track 2 and "The Legacy" as track 14 as part of the live set.

== Credits ==
- Chuck Billy – lead vocals
- Eric Peterson – rhythm and lead guitar, backing vocals, acoustic guitar
- James Murphy – lead and rhythm guitar, nylon-string acoustic guitar
- Greg Christian – bass guitar
- Jon Dette – drums
- Star Nayea – backing vocals (tracks 15, 17)
