= Brotherhood of the Snake =

Studio album by Testament
- Released: October 28, 2016
- Studios: Trident Studios, Pacheco, California; Deer Creek Studio, Nevada City, California; Spin Studio, New York City
- Genre: Thrash metal
- Length: 45:28
- Label: Nuclear Blast
- Producers: Eric Peterson and Chuck Billy

Testament chronology
Dark Roots of Thrash (2013)	Brotherhood of the Snake (2016)	Titans of Creation (2020)

Singles from Brotherhood of the Snake
- 1. "Brotherhood of the Snake" Released: September 2, 2016; 2. "Stronghold" Released: October 12, 2016; 3. "The Pale King" Released: October 31, 2016

Brotherhood of the Snake is the twelfth studio album by American thrash metal band Testament, released on October 28, 2016. It is the band's first studio recording with bassist Steve Di Giorgio since First Strike Still Deadly (2001). Brotherhood of the Snake also marks Testament's fifth collaboration with Andy Sneap, who had mixed and engineered all of their albums since The Gathering (1999) and produced Dark Roots of Earth (2012). The album debuted at number twenty on the Billboard 200 chart, making it Testament's second-highest-charting album in the US, behind Dark Roots of Earth, which peaked at number twelve four years earlier.

== Background and production ==
The possibility of an eleventh Testament studio album was first mentioned about a week before the release of Dark Roots of Earth, when vocalist Chuck Billy stated that Testament would not take "huge gaps" between albums anymore, and would "work hard and tour for two years or so," and try to release another album when they could. Guitarist Eric Peterson added, "There's definitely some politics in the band now. I think if the record does good — which I think it will — it'll see Testament be doing another record. There's some people in the band that are, you know, I think aren't a hundred percent there unless, you know, it keeps going good. That's pretty extreme, but, like for me, I'm down for whatever. I started the band, I'm totally into it. This is what I do. I think, you know, if Testament sees darker days, I don't know if this lineup would stick." Testament spent most of 2012 and 2013 touring in support of Dark Roots of Earth, including supporting Anthrax and Death Angel on the Worship Music tour, and headlining their own U.S. tour, with support from Overkill, Flotsam and Jetsam and 4ARM. 2013 also saw the release of a live DVD/double album from Testament Dark Roots of Thrash, which documents the band's sold-out headlining performance at the Paramount in Huntington, New York in February 2013.

When asked in a September 2013 interview if Testament had any ideas for the follow-up to Dark Roots of Earth, Billy stated Testament would begin writing and recording the album from January to April 2014 for release later that year. He added that the band was in the "right direction" with Dark Roots of Earth, and added "I think that the old saying 'if it's not broken, don't fix it' fits, so we're probably going to stick with the same formula and idea. I think that there isn't any Testament album that sounds the same, so who knows what kind of songs we'll write next year...I don't know." However, these plans fell through, when it was announced in January 2014 that bassist Greg Christian had left Testament for the second time, citing differences with the band and money disputes as the reasons. Christian was replaced by Di Giorgio, who was the bassist for Testament from 1998 to 2004.

Asked in an April 2015 interview about Testament's plans to begin recording a new album, Peterson said that his "main goal" was to "get home [from tour] in June, finish it up and get in the studio by September." Billy added that the band's goal was to have the album finished by Thanksgiving. In May 2016, Billy confirmed the title of Testament's eleventh album to be The Brotherhood of the Snake, which at the time had been recorded, and he hoped for it to be completed before their UK tour in June 2016. Peterson said that the album was going to "get delivered at the end of June, and it'll be probably be delivered to the record company by the end of the summer just in time for a really big tour we're doing of Europe."

On August 4, 2016, Testament began an eight-day countdown to the release of the artwork for Brotherhood of the Snake, and the album's track listing was revealed later that month. In an interview published August 26, 2016, Testament singer Chuck Billy revealed that first single "Brotherhood of the Snake" would be released September 2, 2016. Testament released second single "Stronghold" October 12, 2016. The official video for the song “The Pale King” was released on October 31, 2016.

== Music and lyrics ==
Speaking of the musical direction of Brotherhood of the Snake, Peterson replied, "It's different. This one is more thrash. I mean, this has got some of the fastest stuff that we have ever played. Usually, we have one or two thrash songs, and then we have some mid-tempo, and then we have a slow, heavy one, and then up-tempo kind of stuff. Half of the new record is thrash, which we've never done before." He also described the album as their "kind of Reign in Blood record", a reference to Slayer's third studio album.

Billy has stated that the album draws lyrical inspiration from the ancient astronaut hypothesis, namely through the Ancient Aliens television program. Furthermore, he said the title comes from the name of an ancient secret society. On the same theme, "The Pale King" is about the "alien king" Anu. In a similar vein, "Seventh Seal" is about the Biblical concept.

Several songs feature sociopolitical-themed lyrics. "Stronghold" was described as being about the 2016 United States Presidential Election and how "it doesn’t really matter what the people want because they aren’t being served [by their leaders] anyway.” Billy described "Centuries of Suffering" as having a double meaning, referencing both climate change and the increasing lethality of weapons and warfare over human history. "Canna-Business" is about medical marijuana.

"Born in a Rut" and "Black Jack" feature nihilistic themes, being about "not really caring about what happens, " and gambling and risk-taking, respectively. Billy said that he had rewritten the latter several times. "Neptune's Spear" is about the American special forces raid into Abbotabad, Pakistan that killed Osama Bin Laden. "The Numbers Game" is about a serial killer who murders 14 people in as many days.

== Reception ==
Professional ratings
Aggregate scores
Source	Rating
Metacritic	79/100
Review scores
Source	Rating
AllMusic	3.5/5 stars
Blabbermouth.net	9.5/10
Exclaim!	7/10
Kerrang!	4/5 stars
Metal Injection	8.5/10
Rock Hard	8.0/10

Brotherhood of the Snake has received generally positive reviews from critics. AllMusic writer Thom Jurek gave the album three-and-a-half out of five stars, and states that it "offers an excellent sonic portrait of Testament doing what they do best -- aggressive, riff-heavy, in-your-face thrash. There is a fun concept at work here, but this is more a track-by-track listening experience that adds up to a massive whole." Ray Van Horn of Blabbermouth.net gave the album a 9.5/10 writing "Brotherhood of the Snake" is, astonishingly, thrash virtuosi taken to yet another level. Thirty years from when thrash began to explode, its senior ambassadors MEGADETH, ANTHRAX, DESTRUCTION, DEATH ANGEL, SODOM and, of course, TESTAMENT have served up one clinic after another. Mark it for metal posterity: 2016 is going down as one of thrash's greatest years, and "Brotherhood of the Snake" is an instant classic." Loudwire added "Brotherhood of the Snake is an album that can crush you like a boa constrictor or sink its fangs into you like a rattlesnake. Thankfully, the only venom is that in Billy's voice, and the antidote is to play it repeatedly at maximum volume."

Commercially the album sold nearly 17,000 copies in its first week debuting at number 20 on the Billboard 200 while also becoming their second album to top the Independent Albums chart.

=== Accolades ===
Publication	List	Rank
Metal Hammer	50 Best Metal Albums of 2016	15
OC Weekly	20 Best Metal Albums of 2016	19
WhatCulture	20 Best Hard Rock / Metal Albums of the Year	2
Decibel	Top 40 Albums of 2016	27

== Track listing ==
No.	Title	Lyrics	Music	Length
1.	"Brotherhood of the Snake"	Chuck Billy, Eric Peterson	Peterson	4:14
2.	"The Pale King"	Billy	Peterson	4:51
3.	"Stronghold"	Billy	Peterson	4:00
4.	"Seven Seals"	Billy	Peterson	5:39
5.	"Born in a Rut"	Billy	Peterson	4:57
6.	"Centuries of Suffering"	Billy	Peterson	3:34
7.	"Black Jack"	Billy	Peterson	4:21
8.	"Neptune's Spear"	Billy	Peterson, Alex Skolnick	5:27
9.	"Canna-Business"	Billy	Peterson, Skolnick	3:47
10.	"The Number Game"	Billy	Peterson	4:38
Total length:				45:28

Japan edition bonus track
No.	Title	Lyrics	Music	Length
11.	"Apocalyptic City" (2016 re-recording)	Peterson, Skolnick	Peterson, Skolnick	5:40
12.	"Brotherhood of the Snake" (Alternative Mix)	Billy, Peterson	Peterson	4:13
Total length:				55:21

== Personnel ==
Credits adapted from album liner notes

=== Testament ===
- Chuck Billy – lead vocals
- Alex Skolnick – guitars
- Eric Peterson – guitars, backing vocals
- Steve Di Giorgio – bass
- Gene Hoglan – drums

=== Production ===
- Produced by Eric Peterson and Chuck Billy
- Engineered by Juan Urteaga
- Mixed and Mastered by Andy Sneap

== Charts ==
Chart (2016)	Peak position
Australian Albums (ARIA)	24
Austrian Albums (Ö3 Austria)	23
Belgian Albums (Ultratop Flanders)	29
Belgian Albums (Ultratop Wallonia)	42
Canadian Albums (Billboard)	24
Dutch Albums (Album Top 100)	74
Finnish Albums (Suomen virallinen lista)	18
French Albums (SNEP)	87
German Albums (Offizielle Top 100)	11
Hungarian Albums (MAHASZ)	23
Italian Albums (FIMI)	28
Japanese Albums (Oricon)	22
Polish Albums (ZPAV)	11
Scottish Albums (Official Charts)	26
Spanish Albums (Promusicae)	53
Swedish Albums (Sverigetopplistan)	43
Swiss Albums (Schweizer Hitparade)	16
UK Albums (Official Charts)	43
UK Independent Albums (Official Charts)	10
UK Rock & Metal Albums (Official Charts)	2
US Billboard 200	20
US Independent Albums (Billboard)	1
US Top Hard Rock Albums (Billboard)	2
US Top Rock Albums (Billboard)	2
US Indie Store Album Sales (Billboard)	3
