= Dan Nelson =

American musician

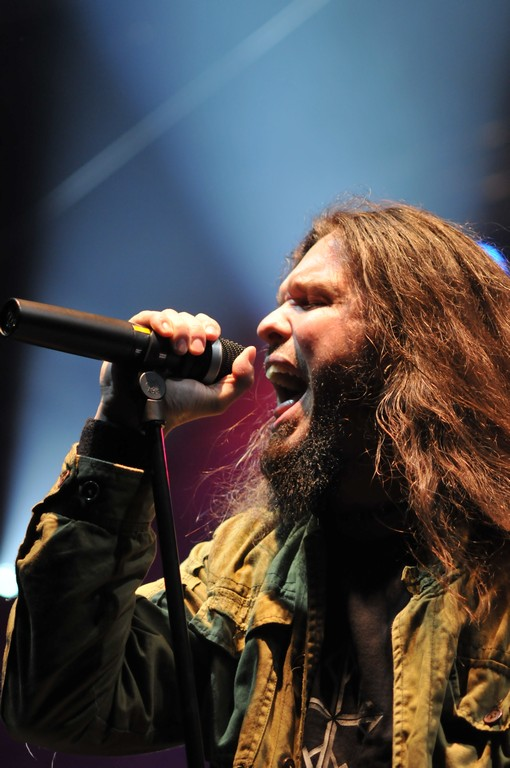
- Nelson in 2009

Background information
- Born: June 21, 1976 (age 49)
- Genres: Heavy metal, hard rock, punk rock, alternative, blues, country blues
- Occupations: Singer, songwriter, musician, record producer
- Instruments: Vocals, guitar, bass

Dan Nelson (born June 21, 1976) is an American singer-songwriter, guitarist and bassist from New York City. A solo artist, he is currently the singer, songwriter and guitarist for the band Dan Nelson and The Contention.

== Music career ==
In the past, Nelson has worked with the Long Island bands Wolfpack Black, Inside Hollow, Discipline, and Devilsize. He was also the lead vocalist/rhythm guitarist for the band BlackGates, which also featured Slayer drummer Paul Bostaph.

Nelson was responsible for writing and recording the original theme song for Combat Zone Wrestling, "Violent Outbreak."

From 2007 to 2009, Nelson was the lead vocalist of American thrash metal band Anthrax, replacing the previous frontman Joey Belladonna following his second departure from the band in January 2007. Nelson was the first Anthrax vocalist to perform with the band in Korea, Colombia, and Estonia. He co-wrote eight songs for the 2011 Anthrax album, Worship Music however his vocal tracks were re-recorded by Belladonna after his departure. According to Scott Ian, Nelson's arrangements and lyrics were altered after his departure as well.

In addition, he also provided the lead vocals and co-wrote songs for the band TRED, and their yet to be released debut album. The band also features guitarist Mike Orlando (Adrenaline Mob) and the late AJ Pero (Twisted Sister) on drums.

Nelson made a guest vocal appearance on the track "Black" for German band President Evil, on their album Back from Hell's Holiday, as well as guest vocals on "Six of Cups" (2010) by Bay Area thrash metal band The Venting Machine, "Hand that Feeds" (2010) by New York-based rock band Dormitory Effect, and "Solid 15" (2009) by Hollywood rock group My Evolution.

Nelson provided all guitar, vocal and keyboard tracks for alternative rock band Hawks of Metropolis. He is featured on both the 2013 EP releases Hawks and Non Terminus Tandem.

Nelson's two-piece band with drummer Phil Deluxe, Mad Tandem, released their debut demo EP The September Demos on November 1, 2016. The music was recorded live, raw and during the actual writing sessions for those songs. Vocals and backing vocals, as well as a few guitar over dubs were added the following day. The whole EP took the duo about a week to finish. The duo wanted to create a "throwback" type of recording....an homage to bands such as The Stooges, The Doors and Cream.

== Other ventures ==
Nelson has also composed and contributed to several film soundtracks including House Call (2011), Once Upon a time in Brooklyn (2013) and the 2017 films/shorts Mr. Wonderful, The Regret Cycle, and Krampusnacht.

Nelson is also a producer, most recently recording, mixing and producing the EP Self Destruct (2016) by the band Fatal Rhythm, and the albums Skeleton of Life (2016) and "Stay Alive" (2017) by Erin McAndrew.

Outside his music career, Nelson has dabbled in acting as well, appearing alongside David Naughton and Brian O'Halloran in Brutal Massacre: A Comedy (2006), as well as The Regret Cycle and Krampusnacht.

== Discography ==
- Powerbomb – self-titled (1998)
- Unbroken – All Things Rearranged... (2001)
- Under Red Sky – URS (2002)

Inside Hollow

- Through the Eyes of Deception (2004)
- The Lazarus Pit (2005)
- Eight Ways to Drown (2006)

BlackGates

- Seeds of War (2010)
- "Burn Eternal" (single) (2014)
- "Overcome" (single) (2016)

Anthrax

- Worship Music (2011) (Co-writing credits on 8 tracks. Vocal tracks on unreleased original version.)

Hawks of Metropolis

- Hawks – (2013)
- Non Terminus Tandem – (2013)

Mad Tandem

- The September Demos (2016)
