= Jon Dette =

American drummer

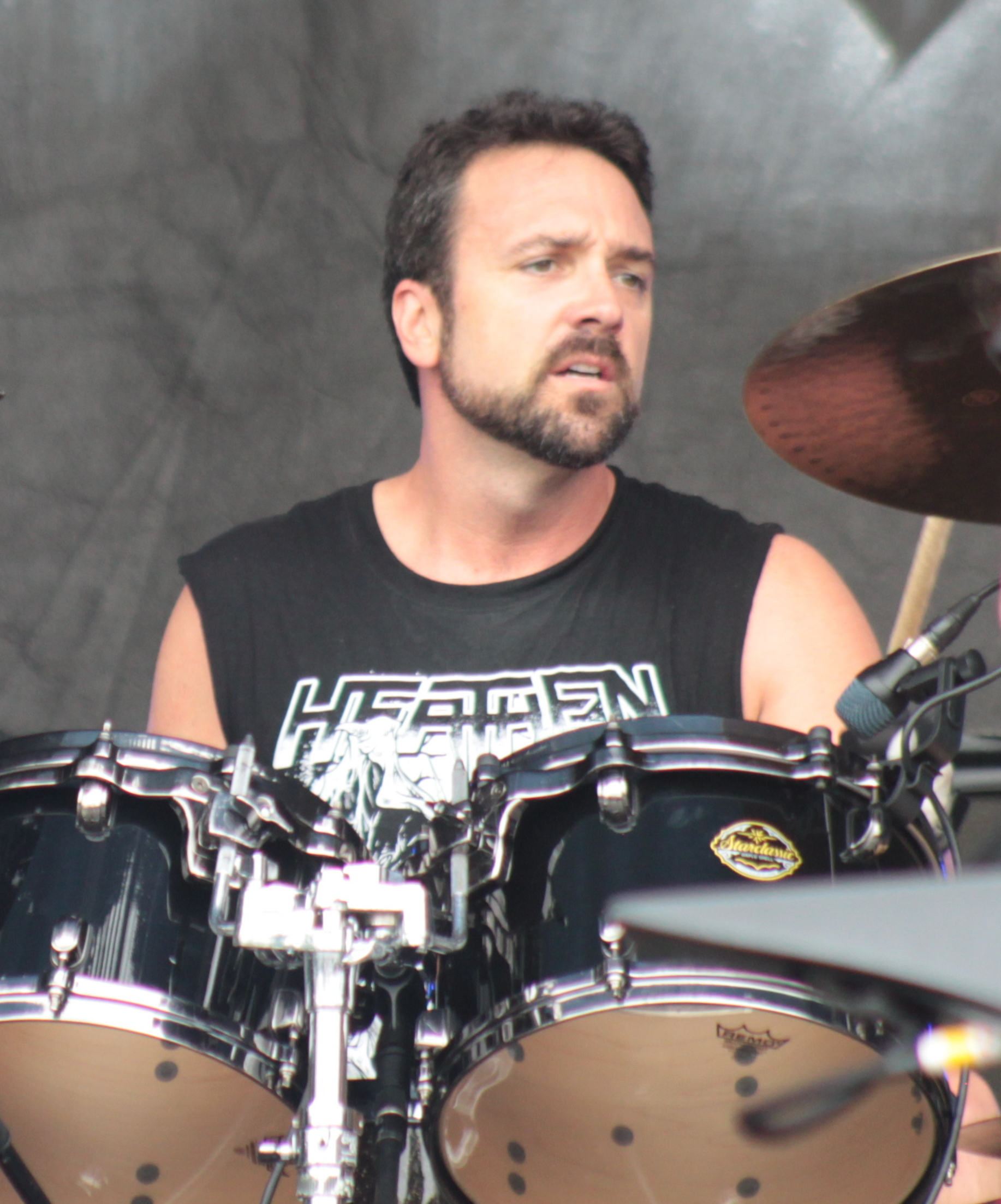
- Dette performing in 2013

Background information
- Born: Jonathan Dette; April 19, 1970 (age 56); San Diego, California, U.S.
- Genres: Thrash metal; speed metal; heavy metal; power metal
- Occupation: Musician
- Instrument: Drums
- Years active: 1994–present
- Formerly of: Slayer; Testament; Animetal USA; Impellitteri; Evildead; Terror; Apocalypse; Meshiaak; Pushed

Jonathan Dette (born April 19, 1970) is an American drummer best known for his time in the thrash metal bands Slayer and Testament. Over the years, he has also been chosen to fill-in with Anthrax, Heathen, Iced Earth, and Volbeat. Dette also played with Evildead and Impellitteri for several years.

== Early life ==
Dette was born in San Diego, California on April 19, 1970. He started playing drums at age 14. In 1984, his parents got divorced. He asked both of them for a drum set, which led to him receiving two drum kits for his birthday, which he converted into a double bass kit. The same birthday, his younger brother got him a copy of Anthrax's Fistful of Metal, which led him to discovering bands similar to Anthrax, such as Metallica and Slayer.

== Career ==
=== Joining Testament and Slayer ===
In the summer of 1994, Dette received the opportunity to audition for thrash metal band Testament, following the departure of John Tempesta, who had left to join White Zombie. With the band, he performed the touring lineup for Low, going from September 1994 to 1995, during which the live album Live at the Fillmore was recorded. In 1996, Dette auditioned for Slayer, following Paul Bostaph's departure from the band, a goal he had set since he was 17, and eventually got the opportunity to join the band. The initial offer had gone to Gene Hoglan who had just finished touring with Death, as he was a long time friend of the band, however, due to Dette's persistence and energy, they gave the gig to him. With the band, he performed consistently until 1997, when he was fired from the band due to a fallout with the members at the time, which led to Bostaph returning to the band. Following his departure from Slayer, he returned to Testament for the time being until he departed again. In 2000, he joined Testament once more, as a fill-in. In 2004, he joined the band HavocHate for the year.

=== Later career ===
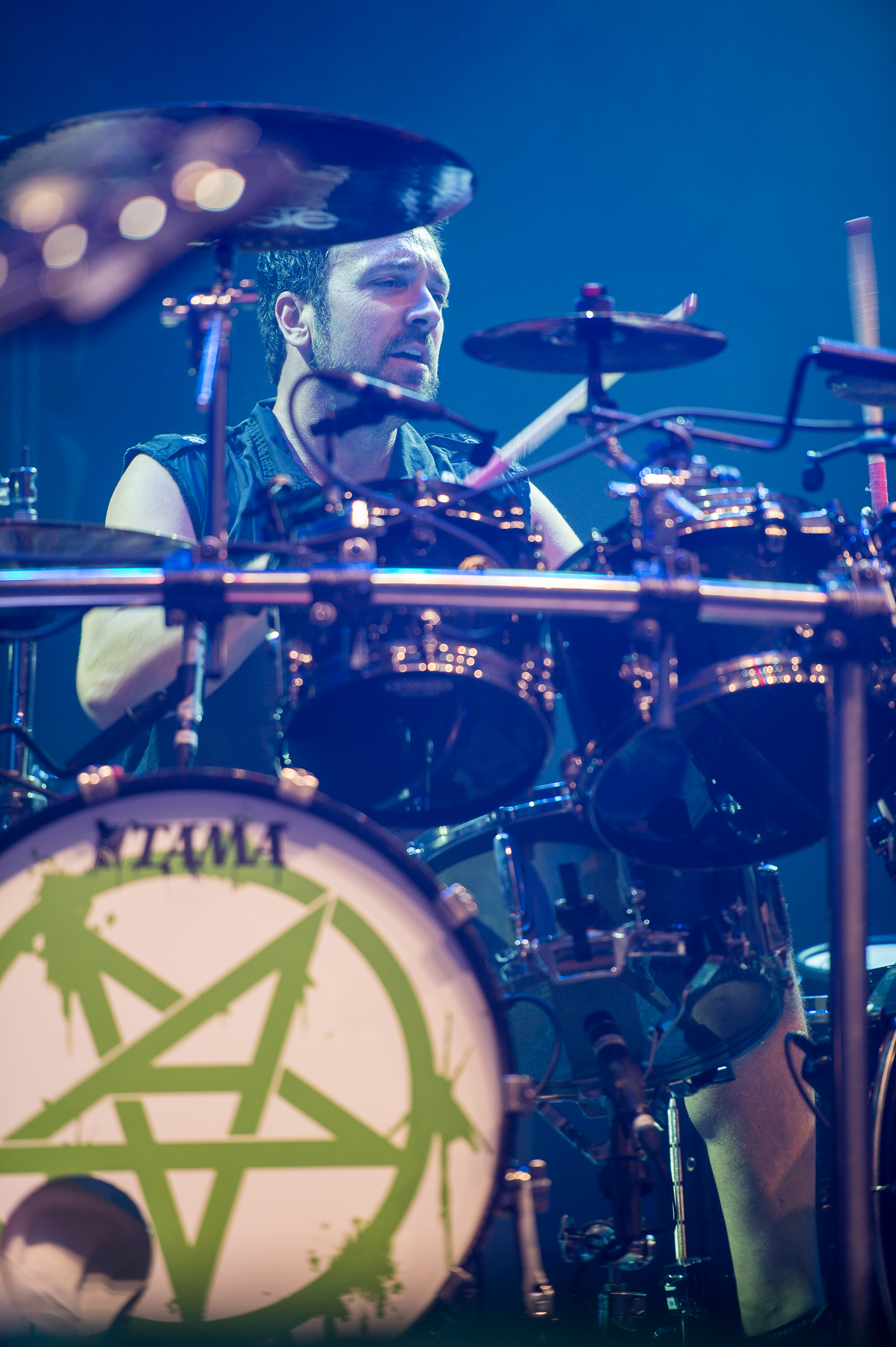
Dette with Anthrax at Rock im Park 2014

In 2011, Dette received the call to fill-in for Heathen, a thrash metal band from California. Dette filled-in for Darren Minter, who was unable to make the tour with Destruction and Warbeast. In 2012, he released an album with the band Animetal USA with the album titled, Animetal USA W. Dette was then hired to play for Anthrax while Charlie Benante was forced to remain in the United States due to personal issues. He performed with the band on a European fall tour supporting Motörhead. Due to Benante's inability to leave the states, Dette was again asked to fill in for him on an Australian tour. While on the Australia tour with Anthrax, Dette received a call from Kerry King, inquiring if he could once again fill-in for Slayer, this time replacing Dave Lombardo, outright. Once the time with Slayer was up again, Heathen hired Dette to fill in once more for them for another European tour. Later that year, Iced Earth hired Dette to play with them, covering for Raphael Saini, who had previously filled in during a tour with Volbeat. The same year, Dette also formed Meshiaak with a friend named Danny Camilleri. Dette toured with Iced Earth until 2015 when Brent Smedley returned to the position. Dette was once again asked to fill in for Benante on an Anthrax tour the same year. Around this time, he was officially announced to have joined Impellitteri. With Impellitteri, he recorded Venom and The Nature of the Beast, before departing the band in 2018. In 2022, Dette was hired to fill-in for Jon Larsen of Volbeat after he tested positive for COVID-19.

== Bands ==
Current

Former

- Apocalypse (1991–1992)
- Animetal USA (2011–2012)
- Evildead (1993–1994)
- Impellitteri (2012–2018)
- Meshiaak (2013–2017)
- Pushed (2000–2003)
- Slayer (1996–1997, 2013)
- Terror
- Testament (1994–1995, 1997, 2000)

Live

- Anthrax (2012–2018)
- Heathen (2011, 2013)
- Iced Earth (2013)
- Volbeat (2022, 2025)

== Discography ==
AniMetal USA

- Animetal USA W (2012)

Testament

- Live at the Fillmore (1995)
- Live at Dynamo Open Air 1997 (2019)

Evildead

- Terror (1994)

Slayer

- Soundtrack to the Apocalypse (2003)

Meshiaak

- Alliance of Thieves (2016)

Impellitteri

- Venom (2015)
- Venom in Osaka (2015)
- The Nature of the Beast (2018)

Heathen

- Control By Chaos (Live At The Dynamo) (2020)
