= Glen Alvelais =

American guitarist

Glen Alvelais (born February 22, 1968) is an American heavy metal guitarist from the San Francisco Bay Area. He was the lead guitarist for the thrash metal band Forbidden and has also played in Testament.

== Career ==
=== Forbidden ===
Alvelais joined Forbidden (then known as "Forbidden Evil") in 1987 as the replacement for Robb Flynn who had quit to join Vio-lence. Alvelais recorded three demos with the band, followed by their cult classic debut Forbidden Evil. After the 1989 touring to support the album, whose Dynamo Open Air appearance was captured on the live album "Raw Evil - Live at the Dynamo", Alvelais parted ways with the band.

=== Testament ===
In 1992, lead guitarist Alex Skolnick informed Testament that he would be leaving the band at the end of the tour and chose Glen as someone he thought would be a good replacement for him. The remaining band members agreed, and Glen joined the band. Glen toured with the band who was still on a touring cycle for The Ritual and appears in the music video for "Return to Serenity". One show from this tour, November 27 at the Hollywood Palladium, was captured on the live EP Return to the Apocalyptic City. Glen struggled to be part of the writing team of Testament, and this friction resulted in him leaving the band. Glen was asked to rejoin the band in 1997 for a guest solo for the Demonic album on the song "New Eyes of Old" and the follow-on touring cycle for the album. The Dynamo Open Air show from this tour was recorded and released as Live at Dynamo Open Air 1997. Again there was friction as Glen tried to make his way into the writing team and he and the band parted ways again.

=== Later activities ===
In 2008, Alvelais orchestrated the reuniting of Forbidden, but left the band in 2009 after the end of the initial reunion touring cycle.

Glen also was recruited to play lead guitar for the metal band Tenet, featuring Jed Simon, Gene Hoglan, and Steve "Zetro" Souza. The band's debut album Sovereign was released in 2009 on Century Media Records.

Alvelais projects include, "LD/50", which features vocalist Clark Brown, bassist Terry Goss, and drummer Tony Providence. The lineup formerly included noted drummer Jeremy Colson.

He later worked with "Earth Crawler", which consisted of members of Falling to Pieces, Left of Christ, Divided, and Scorched-Earth Policy. In 2017, Earth Crawler independently released their first EP entitled, From Below. The album features vocalist - Ryan Reynoso, Guitarist - Kimo Sanborn, Bassist - Terry Goss, and Drummer - Nick Benigno.

== Discography ==
- 1987: Forbidden Evil - "March into Fire" demo
- 1988: Forbidden - Forbidden Evil
- 1989: Forbidden - Raw Evil - Live at the Dynamo
- 1993: Testament - Return to the Apocalyptic City
- 1997: Testament - Demonic (solo on the song "New Eyes of Old")
- 1998: Bizarro - demo
- 2000: LD/50 - Y2K demo
- 2006: X-3 - "Fluoxetine" for Drum Nation 3 (Magna Carta)
- 2009: Tenet (band) Sovereign (solos)
- 2009: Defiance (band) - The Prophecy (solos)
- 2010: LD/50 - LD/50 (demo)
- 2012: Moccasin Creek - Born Ready - Southern Renegade (solo)
- 2015: Eversin - Trinity: The Annihilation We Will Prevail (solo)
- 2016: Lipshok - To Haunt A Quiet Realm (all guitars)
- 2017: Klank - Rise - The Damage (solo)
- 2017: Earth Crawler - From Below
- 2018: War Curse - Eradication - Asylum (solo)
- 2019: Testament - Live at Dynamo Open Air 1997
- 2019: Moshpit Justice - Justice - God Wills It (solo)
- 2020: Slow Down - single from Peace In Chaos
- 2020: October - single from Peace In Chaos
- 2020: Forward Thinking - single from Peace In Chaos
- 2020: Perri's Song - single from Peace In Chaos
- 2020: Game Over - single from Peace In Chaos
- 2020: Daddy Mike - single from Peace In Chaos
- 2020: Never Forget - single from Peace In Chaos
