= Low (Testament album) =

1994 studio album by Testament

Studio album by Testament
- Released: October 4, 1994
- Recorded: 1994
- Studios: A&M Studios, Hollywood, California; Studio D, Sausalito, California
- Genres: Groove metal; thrash metal; death metal; alternative metal
- Length: 47:08
- Labels: Atlantic (1994); Burnt Offerings Inc. (1995)
- Producers: GGGarth, Testament

Testament chronology
Return to the Apocalyptic City (1993)	Low (1994)	Live at the Fillmore (1995)

Low is the sixth studio album by American thrash metal band Testament, released on October 4, 1994 through Atlantic Records. It was the band's first album to feature a new lineup, with guitarist James Murphy and drummer John Tempesta replacing Alex Skolnick and Louie Clemente respectively, and the last album with bassist Greg Christian until 2008's The Formation of Damnation.

== Background ==
Low would be Testament's last album with Atlantic Records, leading group members to create their own label Burnt Offerings Inc. as part of the change; like its predecessor The Ritual, it was released and distributed only by Atlantic, whereas their first four studio albums were co-released through Megaforce Records.

Low was recorded with primary band members Eric Peterson (rhythm guitar), Greg Christian (bass), and Chuck Billy (vocals). It also saw the first of two Testament album appearances by John Tempesta (drums), and three by James Murphy (guitar). Long time Testament collaborator Del James is given composer and vocal credits on the album. Additionally, a music video was filmed for the title track.

Low is dedicated to Savatage guitarist Criss Oliva, who died while Testament was working on the album, and is thanked in the liner notes ("may Criss rest in peace"). Alex Skolnick, who had left Testament two years earlier, briefly replaced Oliva when Savatage was recording their eighth studio album Handful of Rain, which was released a month before Low.

Testament toured for approximately two years to promote Low, playing with bands like Machine Head, downset., Korn, Forbidden, Kreator, At the Gates, Moonspell, Crowbar, Suffocation and Gorefest. As had happened during the accompanying tour for The Ritual, the band had faced a few lineup changes during the Low era. Tempesta left Testament right after the album was finished to join White Zombie, and was replaced by Jon Dette for most of the album's tour cycle in 1994–1995 before he left to join Slayer. Chris Kontos filled in for Dette for the remaining part of the tour before he, Murphy and Christian each quit in 1996, after which Billy and Peterson briefly put the band on ice and then reformed with a new lineup for their next album Demonic.

== Musical style ==
While the band's thrash roots were intact, Low featured a more diverse sound compared to previous Testament albums, which drew influences from progressive and alternative metal, as well as elements of death metal and groove metal. Regarding the album's musical direction, guitarist Eric Peterson recalled in a 2013 interview with Spotlight Report:

"We then got our last chance with Atlantic to do stuff a bit different. Their music director came to us and said: 'We want you guys to give us an alternative record.' According to the world alternative, that would mean something totally different; so I came up with 'Dog Faced Gods,' which is more leaning towards death metal, and I went: 'Here you go, this is our alternative!' But what they wanted was the name alternative. They wanted a mainstream song for the alternative movement. 'Dog Faced Gods' gave us a whole different perspective of what Testament was all about; we were now entering the realm of Swedish black metal, we were flirting with that vibe and mixing it with our stuff. It took on a whole new vibe; by the time we got to The Gathering we reinvented ourselves."

== Artwork ==
Album cover artwork for Low was designed by Dave McKean. He would go on to do the next two Testament studio album covers Demonic (1997) and The Gathering (1999).

== Reissues ==
On September 29, 2017, Metal Blade Records released the album on vinyl for the first time in the US along with the previous album The Ritual, limited to 1500 copies.

== Reception and legacy ==
Professional ratings
Review scores
Source	Rating
AllMusic	4/5 stars
Collector's Guide to Heavy Metal	8/10
Chicago Tribune	4/4 stars
Encyclopedia of Popular Music	3/5 stars
Kerrang!	4/5 stars
Rock Hard	8/10

Reviews for Low have been mixed to positive. AllMusic's John Franck awards the album four stars out of five, and states, "Testament's sixth studio album literally saw the boys from the Bay Area fighting for their lives in the unfriendly surroundings of the alternative nation. Wisely, the band decided to try something completely different and join forces with Rage Against the Machine/Melvins producer GGGarth Richardson. With temporary drummer John Tempesta in place behind the skins, the band began tracking at A&M studios in Los Angeles. Wanting to return to the no-holds-barred yet musically challenging sounds of works past, the GGGarth teaming proved to be the perfect fodder necessary for Testament to regain their confidence."

Low failed to match the critical or popular acclaim of Testament's previous albums, peaking at #122 on the Billboard 200, the band's second lowest chart position after 1988's The New Order, which debuted at #136. "Low" and "Dog Faced Gods" were released as singles to promote the album, but did not chart. However, "Low" and the cover version of Scorpions' "Sails of Charon" (which appears as a B-side of "Dog Faced Gods") received regular airplay on modern rock stations, the most notable being KNAC.

In July 2014, Guitar World placed Low at number 40 in their "Superunknown: 50 Iconic Albums That Defined 1994" list.

== Track listing ==
No.	Title	Lyrics	Music	Length
1.	"Low"	Chuck Billy	Eric Peterson	3:33
2.	"Legions (In Hiding)"	Billy, Del James	Peterson	4:17
3.	"Hail Mary"	Billy, James	Peterson, James Murphy	3:32
4.	"Trail of Tears"	Billy	Peterson	6:06
5.	"Shades of War"	Billy, James	Peterson	4:44
6.	"P.C."	Greg Christian	Christian, Peterson	2:50
7.	"Dog Faced Gods"	Peterson, Billy, James	Peterson	4:02
8.	"All I Could Bleed"	Billy	Peterson	3:37
9.	"Urotsukidōji"	instrumental	Christian, Peterson	3:50
10.	"Chasing Fear"	Billy, James	Peterson, Christian	4:56
11.	"Ride"	Billy, James,	Peterson	3:16
12.	"Last Call"	instrumental	Peterson, Christian	2:41
Total length:				47:08

== Personnel ==
=== Testament ===
- Chuck Billy - lead vocals
- James Murphy - lead guitar
- Eric Peterson - rhythm and lead guitar, backing vocals
- Greg Christian - bass
- John Tempesta - drums

=== Production ===
- GGGarth - production
- Testament - production
- Dave McKean - album cover artwork
- Michael Wagener - mixing
- Bill Kennedy - recording

== Charts ==
Chart (1994)	Peak position
Finnish Albums (The Official Finnish Charts)	25
Japanese Albums (Oricon)	77
Swiss Albums (Schweizer Hitparade)	39
US Billboard 200	122
