= The Gathering (Testament album) =

Studio album by Testament
- Released: June 8, 1999
- Recorded: 1998–1999
- Studios: Driftwood Studio, Oakland, California
- Genres: Thrash metal; death metal
- Length: 42:40
- Labels: Burnt Offerings Inc. Spitfire (1999); Prosthetic (2008)
- Producers: Eric Peterson, Chuck Billy, Phil Arnold (2008)

Testament chronology
Signs of Chaos (1997)	The Gathering (1999)	The Very Best of Testament (2001)

Alternative covers

The Gathering is the eighth studio album by American thrash metal band Testament, released on June 8, 1999. It was the first release the band had done with Spitfire Records. Co-produced by band members, Chuck Billy and Eric Peterson, this was the first album featuring new musicians Steve Di Giorgio on bass guitar and Dave Lombardo on drums. Billy, Peterson and Lombardo, along with longtime Testament collaborator Del James, are also given composer credits on the album. It would also be the only Testament album for Lombardo, who had left the band not long after the release of The Gathering.

The Gathering continued Testament's transition into death metal which began on their previous album Demonic, but it also brought back their thrash-oriented sound. As a result, this album has been seen as a return-to-form for the band.

== Overview ==
The Gathering featured eleven tracks when it was released, drawing critic and fan acclaim for such songs as "D.N.R. (Do Not Resuscitate)", "Riding the Snake", and "Legions of the Dead". After release Testament embarked on the Riding the Snake World Tour to promote the album with "touring" lead guitarist Steve Smyth (ex-Vicious Rumors) and Sadus drummer Jon Allen. The tour ended in 2001 shortly before frontman Chuck Billy was diagnosed with cancer. As a result, Testament would not release another studio album until 2008 with The Formation of Damnation, although they did release an album of re-recorded material, First Strike Still Deadly, in 2001.

The Gathering is the first of five albums to date featuring engineering and mixing work done with artist and former Sabbat guitarist Andy Sneap. It is also the first of five reissues that Testament has done with Prosthetic Records. The album was reissued January 8, 2008, with an instrumental bonus track, "Hammer of the Gods," increasing the new track total to twelve. While "Hammer of the Gods" is listed on the track listing of the original American release, it does not actually appear on the CD. However, it does appear on the worldwide Prosthetic Records 2008 reissue.

Album cover artwork for The Gathering was done by Dave McKean who also did the cover art for the two prior Testament studio albums Demonic and Low.

At the time of release, Testament had not done a music video since 1994's Low and was looking at possibly using live footage as a music video to promote The Gathering. Demonic, the band's previous 1997 release, had been handled by a distribution company that went bankrupt to the tune of $44 million which had stranded most retail supply in locked warehouses and off the shelves, seriously hurting the album release.

== Musical style ==
In a 2010 interview, vocalist Chuck Billy described how the free flow of ideas between Dave Lombardo and Eric Peterson was the "key and secret" to the album's overall heavier sound in comparison to previous albums.

Billy's aggressive vocal approaches and darker death metal sound were apparent on the previous album, Demonic, and continued to be on The Gathering, but it was the range and diversity that he achieved on this album that drew the highest acclaim. While the album's songs range from heavier death metal to a more melodic thrash metal, it was Billy's ability to go from his distinct sound to a death metal growl while blending the two that has been noted as a trademark of Testament.

== Reception ==
Professional ratings
Review scores
Source	Rating
AllMusic	4.5/5 stars
Collector's Guide to Heavy Metal	8/10
Metal Hammer	8/10
Rock Hard	9/10

The Gathering reached #48 on the German album charts, its only chart showing, possibly reflecting problems from the prior albums and a lack of coverage rather than weaknesses with the album.

In 2021, it was named one of the 20 best metal albums of 1999 by Metal Hammer magazine. Loudwire considers it to be among the most essential metal releases of the 1990s for vinyl collectors.

== Track listing ==
"Hammer of the Gods" did not appear on the domestic American re-release, though the song title was listed on the album cover. It is an instrumental bonus track originally only available on the Japan reissue; however, it was eventually added to the Prosthetic Records worldwide 2008 re-release.

No.	Title	Writer(s)	Length
1.	"D.N.R. (Do Not Resuscitate)"	Chuck Billy, Eric Peterson	3:34
2.	"Down for Life"	Billy, Peterson	3:23
3.	"Eyes of Wrath"	Billy, Del James, Peterson	5:26
4.	"True Believer"	Peterson, Derrick Ramirez	3:36
5.	"3 Days in Darkness"	Billy, James, Peterson	4:41
6.	"Legions of the Dead"	Peterson	2:37
7.	"Careful What You Wish For"	Billy, James, Dave Lombardo, Peterson	3:30
8.	"Riding the Snake"	Billy, Peterson	4:13
9.	"Allegiance"	Billy, Lombardo, Peterson	2:37
10.	"Sewn Shut Eyes"	Billy, James, Peterson	4:15
11.	"Fall of Sipledome"	Billy, Peterson	4:48
Total length:			42:40

Japanese reissue and worldwide Prosthetic Records reissue
No.	Title	Writer(s)	Length
12.	"Hammer of the Gods" (Instrumental)	Peterson	3:11
Total length:			45:51

== Personnel ==
Testament

- Chuck Billy – vocals
- James Murphy – lead guitar
- Eric Peterson – rhythm guitar
- Steve Di Giorgio – bass
- Dave Lombardo – drums

Production

- Chuck Billy – co-production
- Eric Peterson – co-production, engineering
- Andy Sneap – engineering, mixing
- James Murphy – engineering
- Phil Arnold – executive production (2008)
- Vincent Wojno – engineering (2008)
- Kent Matcke – engineering (2008)
- Dave McKean – album cover artwork

== Charts ==
Chart (1999)	Peak position
German Albums (Offizielle Top 100)	48
