= Demonic (album) =

Studio album by Testament
- Released: June 24, 1997
- Recorded: 1996–1997
- Studio: Driftwood Studios, Oakland, California
- Genre: Groove metal; death metal
- Length: 40:47
- Label: Burnt Offerings Inc.
- Producer: Eric Peterson, Chuck Billy, Douglas Hall

Testament chronology
Low (1994)	Demonic (1997)	Signs of Chaos (1997)

Professional ratings
Review scores
Source	Rating
AllMusic	3/5 stars
Collector's Guide to Heavy Metal	8/10
Rock Hard	6.5/10

Demonic is the seventh studio album by American thrash metal band Testament. Released in 1997 with original members Chuck Billy (vocals) and Eric Peterson (guitar), the record also features artists Derrick Ramirez (bass), Gene Hoglan (drums) and Glen Alvelais (guitar). Ramirez was previously the band's first guitarist (although here he is performing on bass guitar), and Alvelais had previously performed with Testament on the 1993 live album, Return to the Apocalyptic City. Demonic was also Testament's only album with Hoglan for 15 years, until he rejoined and performed on the album Dark Roots of Earth (2012).

Musically and lyrically, this album is very different from anything Testament had released before, marking a deviation from previous albums to a much darker death metal sound mirroring the album's exorcism theme. Songs like "John Doe" and "Hatred's Rise" stand out in reviews as examples noting the overall heavier change.

== Artwork ==
The album cover art for Demonic was done by Dave McKean who also did the cover art for the prior Testament studio album, Low and would go on to do their next, The Gathering. In a 1999 interview while supporting the release of The Gathering, Peterson described how the image depicts a type of African exorcism where a wooden mask is made to represent the possessed victim. Nails are then driven into it cleansing the afflicted person of the evil spirit.

McKean gets double duty from the cover's pentagram graphic using the style depiction from the Legacy (band) logo, the band name Testament released a 1985 demo under, as both a nod to longtime fans and as the spirit being driven forth. The center skull art without the pentagram enclosure can be seen on the album cover of Testament's first studio album, The Legacy.

== Re-release ==
In summer 2017, Nuclear Blast Records announced they would be rereleasing Demonic on November 17, 2017 (though this was later delayed to 2018) featuring new cover artwork.

== Track listing ==
All lyrics by Chuck Billy and all music by Eric Peterson except as noted

No.	Title	Lyrics	Music	Length
1.	"Demonic Refusal"		Peterson, Ramirez	5:21
2.	"The Burning Times"		Peterson, Ramirez	5:15
3.	"Together as One"			4:17
4.	"Jun-Jun"		Peterson, Ramirez	3:43
5.	"John Doe"			3:11
6.	"Murky Waters"			3:00
7.	"Hatred's Rise"			3:15
8.	"Distorted Lives"			3:36
9.	"New Eyes of Old"	Billy, Peterson	Peterson, Alvelais	3:00
10.	"Ten Thousand Thrones"			4:37
11.	"Nostrovia"		Peterson, Ramirez	1:32
Total length:				40:47

== Personnel ==
Credits adapted from liner notes of 2018 reissue, except as noted

=== Testament ===
- Chuck Billy – vocals
- Eric Peterson – guitars
- Derrick Ramirez – bass
- Gene Hoglan – drums

=== Additional musician ===
- Glen Alvelais – additional guitar on "New Eyes"

=== Production and design ===
- Produced by Eric Peterson and Chuck Billy
- Co-produced and engineered by Douglas Hall
- Assistant engineering by Mauricio Avecedo
- Mixed by Michael Wagener
- Mastered by George Marino
- Album cover artwork by Dave McKean (1997)
- Band photo by Walter Morgan
- Artwork by Marcelo Vasco (2018)

== Charts ==
Chart (1997)	Peak position
UK Rock & Metal Albums (OCC)	33
