= Testament (band) =

American thrash metal band

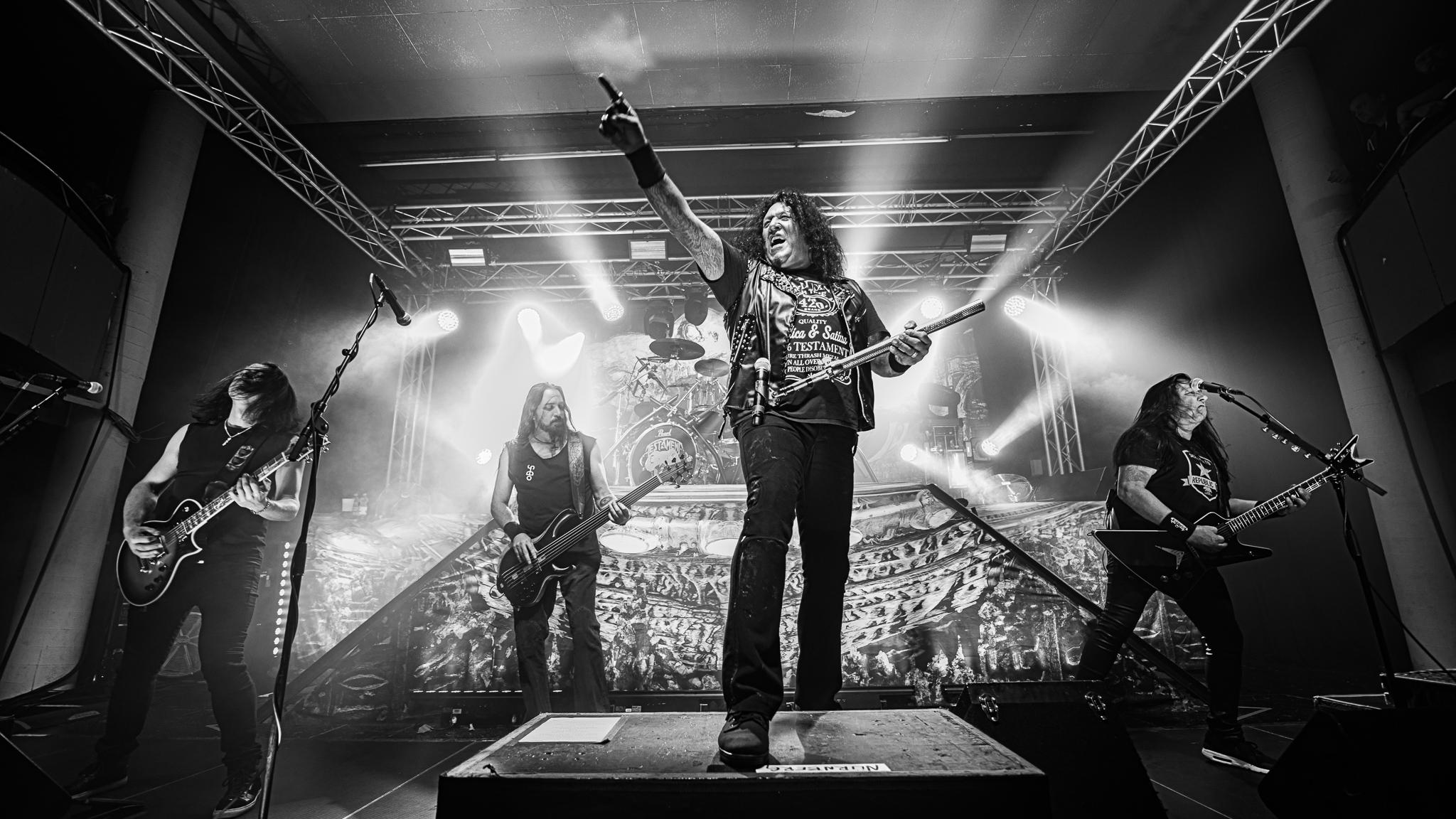
- Testament performing in 2017

Background information
- Also known as: Legacy (1983–1986)
- Origin: Berkeley, California, U.S.
- Genre: Thrash metal
- Works: Discography
- Years active: 1983–present
- Labels: Atlantic; Megaforce; Spitfire; Burnt Offerings Inc.; Nuclear Blast
- Spinoffs: Dragonlord; Dublin Death Patrol; Hatriot; Metal Allegiance
- Members: Eric Peterson; Chuck Billy; Alex Skolnick; Steve Di Giorgio; Chris Dovas
- Past members: See List of former Testament members
- Website: testamentlegions.com
- Logo

Testament is an American thrash metal band from Berkeley, California. Formed in 1983 under the name Legacy, the band's current lineup includes rhythm guitarist Eric Peterson, lead vocalist Chuck Billy, lead guitarist Alex Skolnick, bassist Steve Di Giorgio and drummer Chris Dovas. Testament has experienced many lineup changes over the years, with Peterson being the only remaining original member (though both he and Billy, who replaced original frontman Steve "Zetro" Souza in 1986, appear on every studio album). The band has released fourteen studio albums (one of which is a collection of re-recorded songs), four live albums, five compilation albums, thirteen singles and three DVDs. They are estimated to have sold over 1.4 million albums in the United States since the beginning of the SoundScan era, and over 14 million copies worldwide as of 2016.

Testament is credited as one of the leaders of the second wave of thrash metal of the late 1980s, and they are considered a significant member of the so-called "Big Six of Bay Area thrash metal" (along with Exodus, Death Angel, Lȧȧz Rockit, Forbidden and Vio-lence). By the time they changed their name from Legacy to Testament in 1986, the band had assumed a stable lineup that included Billy, Peterson, Skolnick, and two other founding members, bassist Greg Christian and drummer Louie Clemente; it is often referred to as the "classic lineup" of Testament. While the band was initially signed to Megaforce, they were one of the early thrash metal bands to sign to a major label, Atlantic Records, through which the band's first six studio albums were released. Their first three studio albums – The Legacy (1987), The New Order (1988) and Practice What You Preach (1989) – cemented Testament's reputation as one of the most successful thrash metal bands, with the latter becoming their first to enter the Top 100 on the Billboard 200 chart.

The band's next three albums – Souls of Black (1990), The Ritual (1992) and Low (1994) – saw similar success, with the first two charting highly on the Billboard 200 chart; The Ritual was supported by Testament's only charting US single "Return to Serenity". Clemente and Skolnick had both left Testament by the end of 1992, and within the next decade, the band had endured many personnel changes that included guitarists Glen Alvelais, James Murphy, Steve Smyth and "Metal" Mike Chlasciak, bassists Derrick Ramirez (who was originally in Legacy as a guitarist) and Di Giorgio, and drummers Paul Bostaph, John Tempesta, Jon Dette, Chris Kontos, Gene Hoglan, Dave Lombardo, Steve Jacobs and Jon Allen. In 2001, at around the same time Billy was diagnosed with germ cell seminoma, Testament reunited with Souza, Skolnick and Tempesta for the album of re-recorded material First Strike Still Deadly. Following Billy's recovery from cancer in 2002, Testament resumed activity, and their "classic lineup" briefly reunited in 2005, resulting in the live album Live in London; however, Skolnick and Christian would rejoin the band permanently, with the latter remaining until 2014. Testament's popularity was revived with the albums The Formation of Damnation (2008), Dark Roots of Earth (2012), Brotherhood of the Snake (2016) and Titans of Creation (2020), all entering the Top 100 on the Billboard 200, and they have continued to tour consistently. The band's latest studio album, Para Bellum, was released on October 10, 2025.

== History ==
=== Early years and first two albums (1983–1989) ===
Testament was formed in the San Francisco Bay Area in 1983 under the name Legacy by guitarist Eric Peterson and his cousin, guitarist Derrick Ramirez. They eventually hired drummer Louie Clemente, vocalist Steve "Zetro" Souza and bassist Greg Christian, and began playing shows with bands like Exodus, Slayer, Anthrax, Lȧȧz Rockit, and Death Angel, among others. Clemente left the band in 1985 and was replaced by drummer Mike Ronchette. Ramirez departed soon after and then-teenage guitarist Alex Skolnick, who had studied under Bay Area guitarist Joe Satriani, was brought into the band. Legacy had been writing original material since its formation and released a self-titled, four-song demo in 1985. Souza left the band in the following year to replace Paul Baloff in Exodus and was replaced by Chuck Billy at Souza's suggestion. Ronchette had also left the band, and Clemente rejoined.

Legacy was signed to Megaforce Records in 1986 on the strength of their demo tape. While recording their first album, the band was forced to change their name to Testament (which, according to Maria Ferrero in the May 2007 issue of Revolver, was suggested by Billy Milano of S.O.D. and M.O.D.), as there were already multiple other bands with the name Legacy. Legacy played its last show prior to the name change at the Stone in San Francisco on March 4, 1987.

Testament's debut album, The Legacy, was released in April 1987 on Megaforce Records, and also distributed by Atlantic. They received instant fame within thrash circles and were often compared with fellow Bay Area thrash metal pioneers Metallica. Thanks to this, and the regular rotation of their first-ever music video "Over the Wall" on MTV's Headbangers Ball, the band quickly managed to increase their exposure by heading out on successful North American and European tours with Anthrax, who were supporting their Among the Living album. On this tour, the Live at Eindhoven EP was recorded. Testament also opened for Megadeth and Slayer, as well as their then-labelmates Overkill.

The 1986–1992 lineup of Testament is known as the "classic lineup" of the band. Pictured from left to right are Eric Peterson, Greg Christian, Chuck Billy, Alex Skolnick, and Louie Clemente.

Testament's second album, The New Order, was released in May 1988, and it found the band continuing in a similar vein. The album was a minor success, peaking at number 136 on the Billboard 200, but managed to sell over 250,000 copies on the strength of the airplay of "Trial by Fire" and the cover version of Aerosmith's "Nobody's Fault" (through radio and television), as well as relentless tour schedules. In promotion of The New Order, Testament supported Megadeth on their So Far, So Good... So What! tour in Europe, and toured North America with the likes of Overkill, Voivod, Death Angel, Vio-lence, Nuclear Assault, Sanctuary, Raven, Forbidden, and Heathen. They also made a number of festival appearances during the summer of 1988, such as Metalfest in Milwaukee, Aardschokdag in the Netherlands, and replaced Megadeth on some dates of the European Monsters of Rock tour, also featuring Iron Maiden, Kiss, David Lee Roth, Great White and Anthrax. By the time The New Order tour concluded in early 1989, Testament had not only cemented their reputation as one of the most-acclaimed thrash metal bands, but had also begun to headline their own tours.

=== Commercial breakthrough (1989–1992) ===
Testament released their third studio album, Practice What You Preach, in August 1989. The album minimized the occult and gothic themes found in the lyrical content of their first two albums, instead focusing on social issues such as politics and corruption. While staying true to its thrash metal roots, the album also saw the band draw influences from a variety of musical genres, such as traditional heavy metal, jazz fusion and progressive metal. Practice What You Preach was a commercial breakthrough for Testament, reaching at number 77 on the Billboard 200, and it was accompanied by three singles – the title track, "The Ballad" and "Greenhouse Effect" – that received significant airplay from AOR radio stations and MTV's Headbangers Ball, further helping raise the band's profile. Testament toured for nearly a year behind Practice What You Preach, performing with numerous bands such as Overkill, Annihilator, Wrathchild America, Mortal Sin, Xentrix, Nuclear Assault, Savatage, Flotsam and Jetsam, Mordred, Dark Angel, and a then-lesser known Primus. Despite selling more than 450,000 copies, the album has never been certified gold by the RIAA.

In October 1990, Testament released their fourth studio album Souls of Black. Although reviews were mixed, the album managed to sell respectably, in no doubt largely off the strength of the single title track, and saw the band perform on arena tours, including the European Clash of the Titans tour with Megadeth, Slayer and Suicidal Tendencies. Testament supported Souls of Black with two North American tours, opening for Judas Priest on their Painkiller tour from October to December 1990, and Slayer on their Seasons in the Abyss tour from January to March 1991. They also toured Japan, and played shows with Anthrax and Sepultura. Shortly after the Souls of Black tour's completion, the band released their first VHS documentary Seen Between the Lines, containing live clips recorded during the Souls of Black world tour, four promotional music videos and video interview segments.

Attempting to reconnect with an audience distracted by the then-emerging grunge movement, Testament released its fifth studio album The Ritual in May 1992. Recorded at One on One Recording in Los Angeles under producer Tony Platt, it saw a stylistic move away from thrash to a slower, slightly more traditional heavy metal sound, and a somewhat more progressive atmosphere, with the title track being the longest song Testament had recorded up to this point. Drummer Louie Clemente acknowledged this musical change in a 1992 interview with Deseret News, explaining, "The Ritual is slower and geared toward the old style of metal while The Legacy was pure thrash. In fact, every release has been different. We've progressed naturally." Clemente said in the same interview that Platt's involvement within the album helped Testament "get more of a vibe." The Ritual peaked at number 55 on the Billboard 200, the band's highest chart position at the time, and the power ballad "Return to Serenity" managed to receive radio airplay, peaking at number 22 on the Mainstream Rock chart, and it is their only single to peak at any Billboard charts. Despite selling more than 485,000 copies in the United States, the album has never received a gold certification. In support of The Ritual, Testament toured Europe and North America, headlining their own tours, as well as supporting Iron Maiden on their Fear of the Dark tour, and Black Sabbath on their Dehumanizer tour. However, the success of the album did not put an end to the tensions within the band.

=== Transitional period (1992–2004) ===
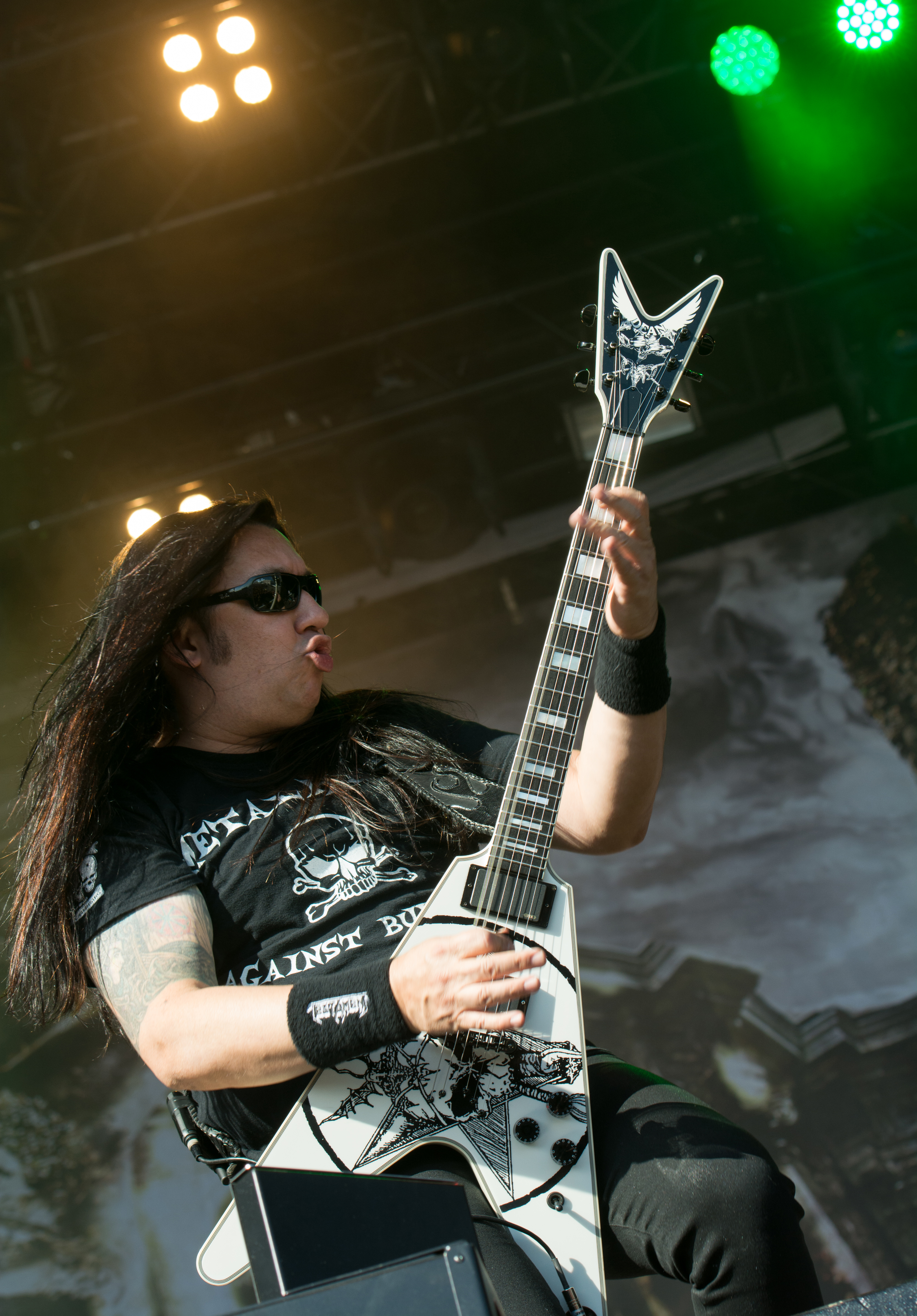
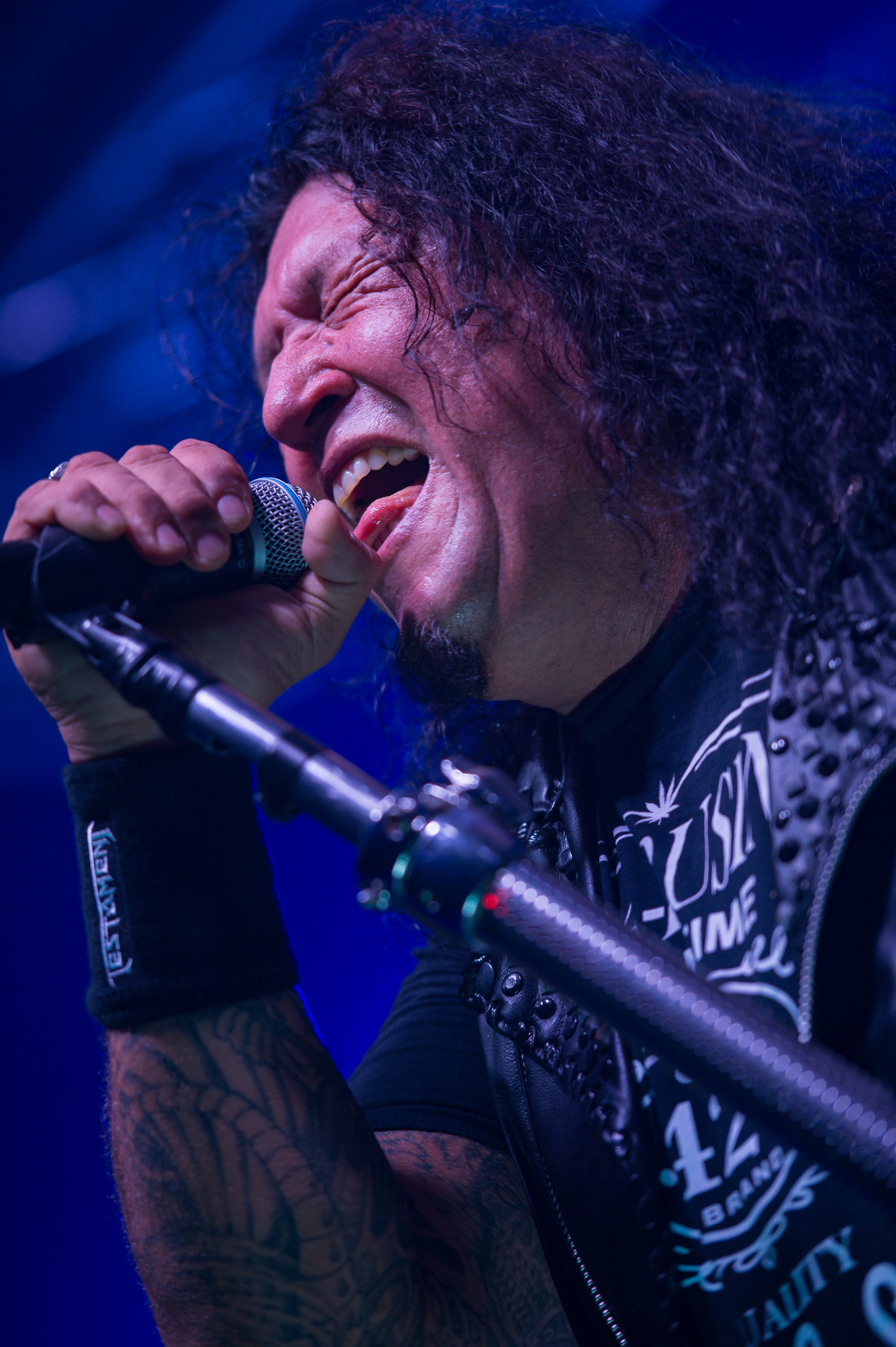
Founding member and guitarist Eric Peterson (pictured left) and vocalist Chuck Billy, who joined Testament in 1986, are the only members to appear on all of the band's studio albums.

For the remainder of the 1990s, Testament had undergone a series of changes in its lineup, as well as a change of pace in its musical style. The first member of the "classic" lineup to leave the band was lead guitarist Alex Skolnick, who performed his last show with them on Halloween 1992. Skolnick has stated that one of the reasons he left Testament was because he wanted to expand his musical horizons rather than continuing to play thrash metal music. Not long after, drummer Louie Clemente left the band.

Skolnick and Clemente were temporarily replaced by former Forbidden members Glen Alvelais and Paul Bostaph (the latter of whom had recently joined Slayer), respectively. This lineup recorded the live EP, Return to the Apocalyptic City, released in 1993. Soon after, Alvelais quit the band and Bostaph departed to focus on Slayer. Their next album, Low (1994), featured drummer John Tempesta (formerly of Exodus) and guitarist James Murphy (formerly of Death, Cancer and Obituary). Low was a diverse album, featuring various influences such as alternative, death metal, progressive and groove metal, as well as a power ballad, "Trail of Tears". The band's remaining fans reacted favorably to the album, although it did little to expand Testament's fanbase. Some fans, however, viewed this move away from the mainstream as a liberation that allowed them to expand artistically, not being pressured by sales and success as they once were. Despite the fact that the album charted lower than the band's previous three albums on the Billboard 200 at number 122, its title track "Low" received decent airplay from Headbangers Ball on MTV and the Long Beach-based radio station KNAC, just before both outlets went off the air in early 1995. Testament toured for over a year in support of Low, playing with numerous acts such as Machine Head, downset., Korn, Forbidden, Kreator, At the Gates, Moonspell, Crowbar, Suffocation, and Gorefest. Their first full-length live album Live at the Fillmore, released in the summer of 1995, was recorded during this tour and marked their first release after ending their eight-and-a-half-year tenure with Atlantic Records.

Tempesta left Testament shortly before the release of Low to join White Zombie, being replaced by Jon Dette for the following tour, though the latter would leave the band in 1995. Dette's replacement was former Machine Head drummer Chris Kontos. This lineup was featured on the band's cover version of Judas Priest's "Rapid Fire". After their 1996 club tour, Christian, Murphy, and Kontos all departed the band. During the time Kontos was in Testament, he suggested the band drop the name altogether and call the band Dog Faced Gods. This idea was turned down by Billy and Peterson who both wanted to continue with the Testament name. The two later temporarily disbanded Testament.

The band's seventh studio album, Demonic (1997), took a new approach, and found Testament experimenting with death metal more. The album featured Peterson on both lead and rhythm guitar (although Alvelais made a guest appearance, and played on the subsequent tour), early member Derrick Ramirez on bass guitar, and Dark Angel and former Death drummer Gene Hoglan. Hoglan left before the Demonic tour began by joining Strapping Young Lad, with Steve Jacobs doing the South American leg of the tour and Jon Dette returning later. Hoglan's loyalty to Strapping Young Lad and his desire to not remain a member of Testament actually came to realization during a published interview the band conducted with Metal Maniacs magazine.

By 1998, Ramirez, Alvelais and Dette had all departed and Murphy had returned for the band's eighth studio album The Gathering, released in June 1999. The rhythm section on The Gathering was highly respected, consisting of metal fretless bassist Steve Di Giorgio (formerly of Death and Sadus) and original Slayer drummer Dave Lombardo. The sound of the album was largely a combination of death metal and thrash metal, with a minor black metal influence from Peterson's side project, Dragonlord.

Soon after the release of The Gathering, Murphy was diagnosed with a brain tumor. Through various fundraisers, Murphy was able to afford surgery and eventually made a full recovery, but was unable to recall anything from the recording of The Gathering. In 2001, Billy was also diagnosed with germ cell seminoma, a rare form of testicular cancer, but it only affected Billy's lungs and heart. His cancer was also treated successfully. In August 2001, friends of Billy organized the Thrash of the Titans benefit concert, featuring fellow Bay Area thrash metal bands Vio-lence, Death Angel, Exodus, Forbidden, Sadus and Heathen, as well as Anthrax, S.O.D. and Flotsam and Jetsam. The show was headlined by a reunited Legacy, featuring Steve Souza on vocals, and former guitarist Alex Skolnick, who had not played with the band since 1992, and bassist Greg Christian. Also in 2001, Testament released First Strike Still Deadly, a collection of re-recordings (with modern studio technology) of songs from their first two albums. It featured the lineup of Billy, Peterson, Di Giorgio, the returns of Souza on vocals (for the album's last two tracks), Skolnick on guitar, and John Tempesta on drums.

By 2002, Billy had made a full recovery, and the band began performing live again with a new lineup, which included then-Sadus drummer Jon Allen. In 2004, the band changed their lineup once again for their summer festival appearances. Allen was replaced by Paul Bostaph, returning to the band for a second stint after a decade's absence. Lead guitarist Steve Smyth departed to join Nevermore and was replaced by former Halford guitarist "Metal" Mike Chlasciak. Shortly after Smyth's departure, Peterson fell down a flight of stairs, breaking his leg, and was unavailable for some dates; he was temporarily replaced by Smyth.

=== Reunion of "classic lineup" and The Formation of Damnation (2005–2010) ===
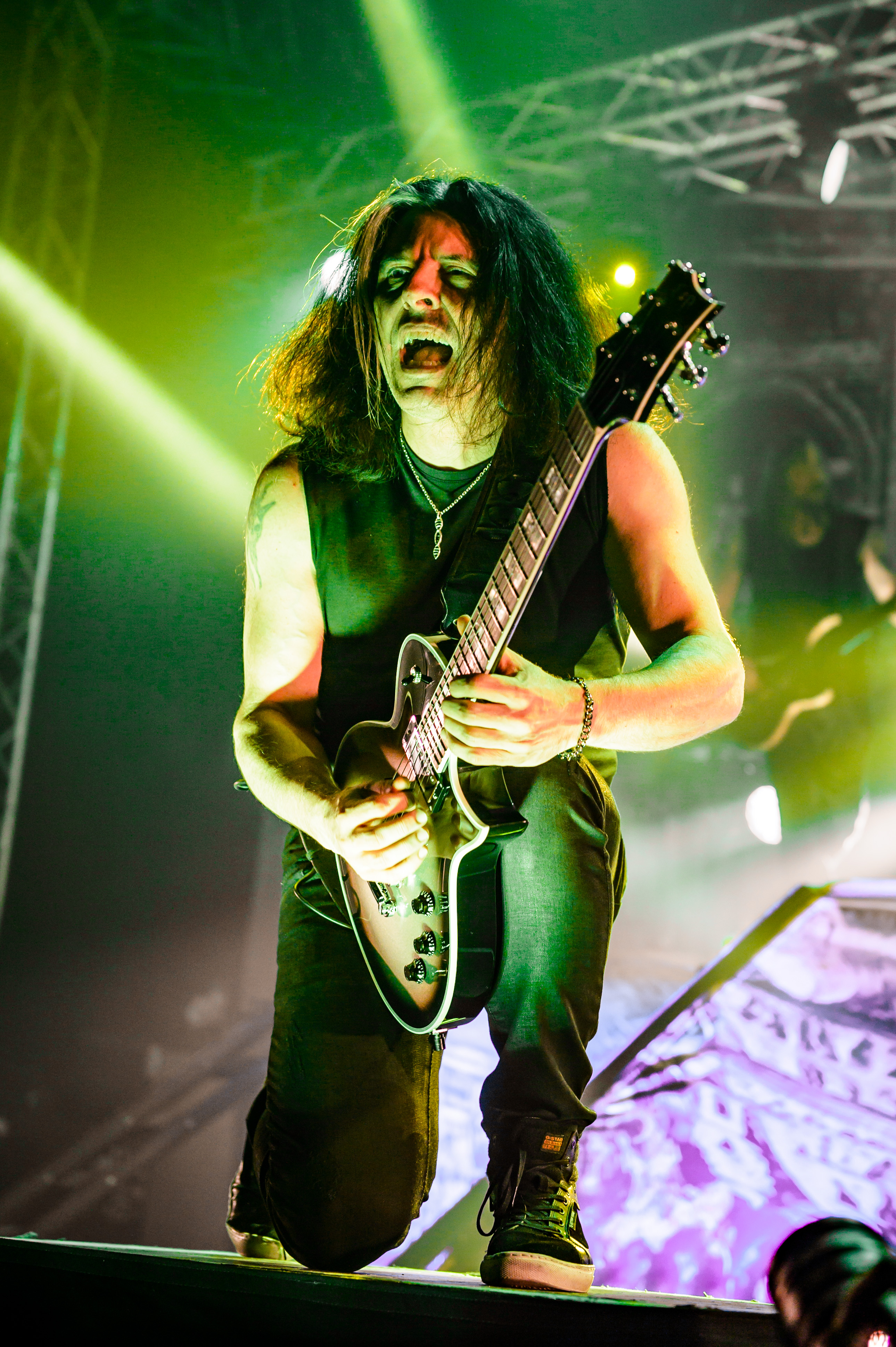
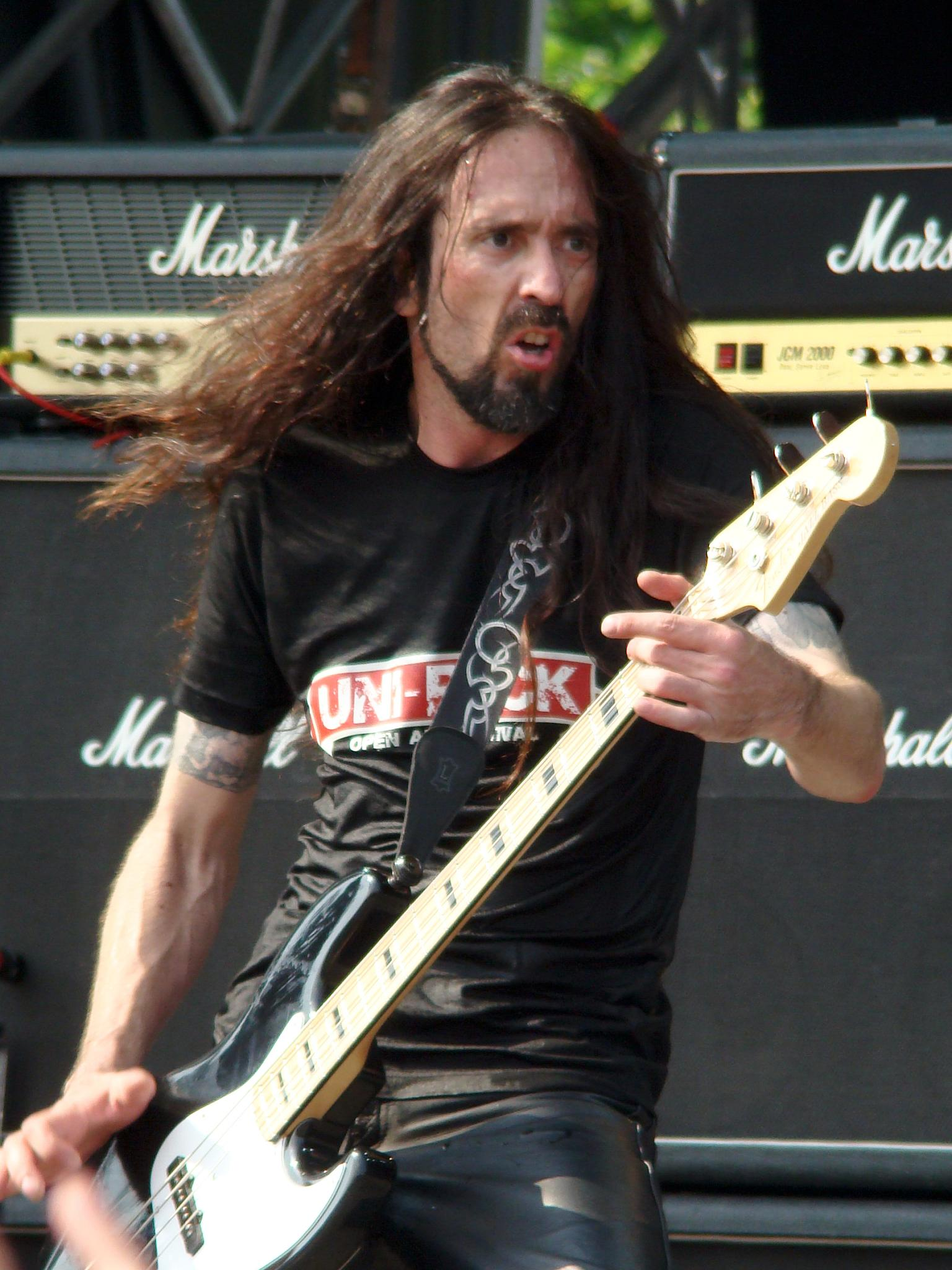
Lead guitarist Alex Skolnick and bassist Greg Christian were two of the three members of the "classic" Legacy lineup to rejoin the band in 2005.

In May 2005, it was announced that Testament would be doing a brief European reunion tour – known as the "10 Days in May Tour" – featuring the "classic lineup" of Billy, Peterson, Skolnick and Christian, with drum duties shared between John Tempesta and Louie Clemente. After the success of the initial tour dates, Testament announced more dates in the U.S., Europe, and Japan with the classic lineup. Later that year, Skolnick also toured the East Coast with Trans-Siberian Orchestra. The band went on to release a live DVD and CD from the tour, entitled Live in London. In interviews on the DVD, Eric Peterson expressed his desire to record the follow-up to The Gathering with the "classic" Testament lineup. He also stated that Skolnick had begun writing songs for a new album. Chuck Billy was very vocal about how happy he was to have Skolnick, Christian, Clemente, and Tempesta in the band once again, and hoped to maintain a stable lineup going forward. Also in 2005, Testament's long-out of print documentary Seen Between the Lines was released on DVD for the first time.

Testament played for the first time in the Middle East at the Dubai Desert Rock festival in March 2006. Other notable bands that performed at the Desert Rock festival were Iron Maiden, Megadeth, Reel Big Fish and 3 Doors Down.

In July 2007, the band played a show at the Jaxx Nightclub in Springfield, Virginia, with Paul Bostaph filling in on drum duties. It was later confirmed that Bostaph would be officially returning to the band to record a new album. The band debuted a new song at that show titled "The Afterlife", which they also played at Earthshaker Fest.

In February 2008, Testament released the song "More Than Meets the Eye" from its then-upcoming album The Formation of Damnation on their Myspace page. The Formation of Damnation, their first studio album in seven years (and first with all-new material in nine years), was released two months later through Nuclear Blast Records. It was the first Testament album to feature guitarist Alex Skolnick since 1992's The Ritual, and the first to feature bassist Greg Christian since 1994's Low.

Testament toured for more than two years in support of The Formation of Damnation. The band performed the main event on the first day of "Gillmanfest", a rock festival to be held on May 24, 2008, in Valencia, Venezuela, visiting Colombia for the second time in the band's extensive career. In June 2008, Testament headlined the third stage at Download Festival, held at Donington Park, and a month later, they played at Ozzy Osbourne's Monsters of Rock festival in Calgary, Alberta, Canada. The band also toured North America as a supporting act for Judas Priest, Heaven & Hell, and Motörhead on the Metal Masters Tour. The band announced that they had recruited guitarist Glen Drover (ex-Megadeth and King Diamond) to fill in on their upcoming Mexican tour dates with Judas Priest, due to Alex Skolnick's prior commitment to the Trans-Siberian Orchestra. Testament embarked on the "Priest Feast" European tour with headliners Judas Priest and Megadeth in February and March 2009. On March 25, 2009, Testament played a special one-off show at the O2 Islington Academy in London, where they performed their first two albums (The Legacy and The New Order) back-to-back, with British thrash band Sylosis in support. Also in 2009, Testament set out on a six-week tour across the US to promote The Formation of Damnation, touring with Unearth and Lazarus A.D. In early 2010, Testament toured the United States with Megadeth and Exodus. Alex Skolnick did not participate in the tour due to previous obligations and Glen Drover once again filled in for him. In the summer of 2010, the band toured Australia, and supported Megadeth and Slayer on the American Carnage Tour. Testament also headlined for the first time in the Philippines for the annual Pulp Summer Slam on April 17, 2010 with Lamb of God.

=== Dark Roots of Earth (2010–2013) ===
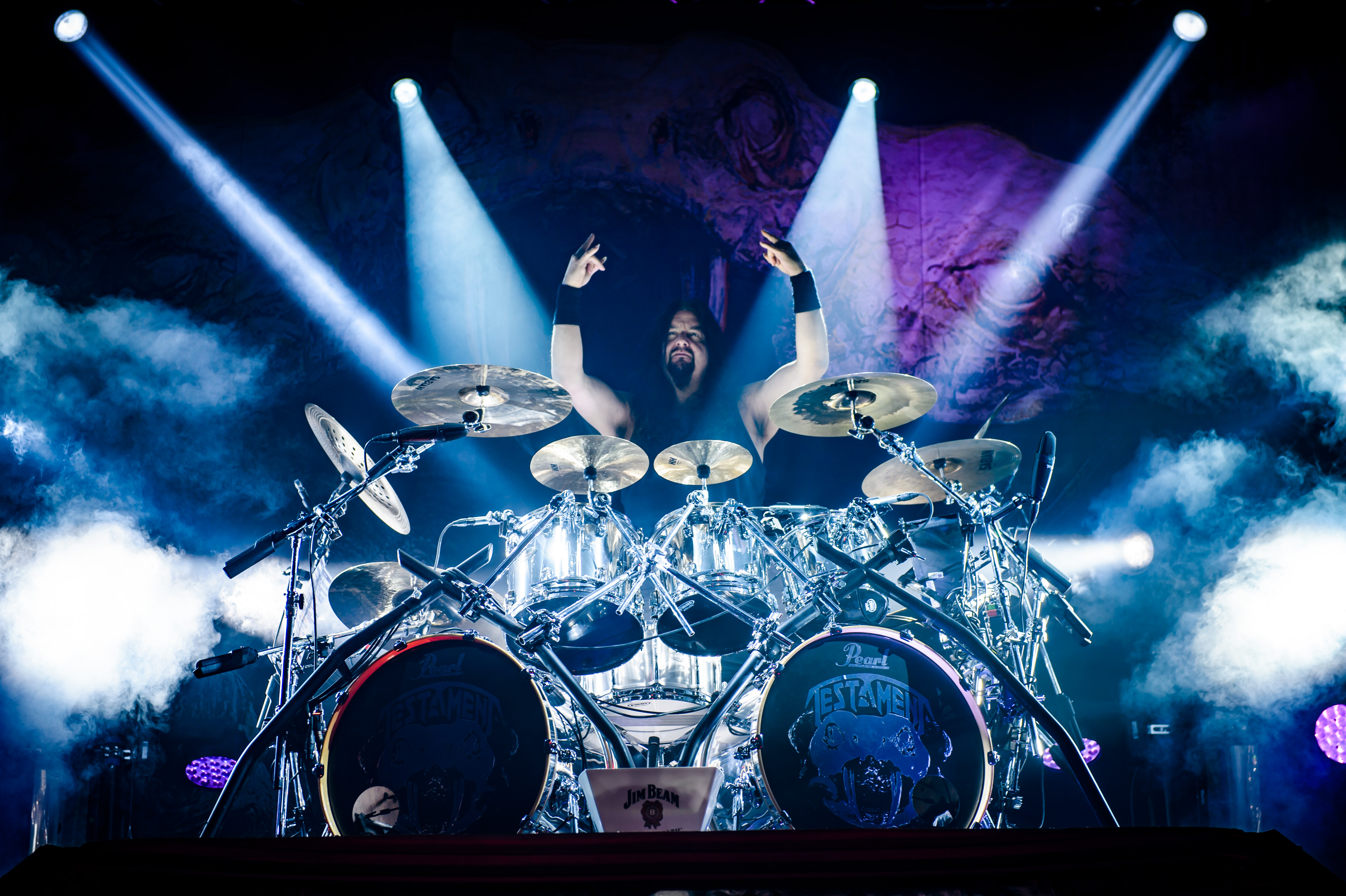
Drummer Gene Hoglan, who was previously in Testament for the recording of their seventh studio album Demonic (1997), rejoined the band in 2011. He performed on three more studio albums with Testament before departing once again in 2022.

As early as 2009, Testament began writing new material for their eleventh album. In an interview with Metalheadz, Peterson stated that there were about four songs written and that "there's other guys in the band who like to play the more rock melodic style but the next one is gonna be a bit heavier." In a January 2011 interview during the 70000 Tons of Metal cruise, Billy revealed that Testament had been working on six new songs, with four or five "maybe left to write," and would begin recording their new album by early March. On May 18, 2011, Skolnick posted an update on his Twitter, saying, "Another tune done! My riffs from last week [plus] some of [fellow Testament guitarist Eric Peterson's] plus new ones we wrote today. Planning one more, then we've got more than we need."

Testament began recording their eleventh studio album on June 20, 2011. Drummer Paul Bostaph was unable to take part in the recording due to a "serious injury", although he was expected to rejoin when the band began touring to support the album. Bostaph was replaced by Gene Hoglan, who had played drums with Testament on their 1997 album Demonic.

Testament appeared at the California dates of the summer 2011 Rockstar Energy Drink Mayhem Festival as the replacement of In Flames.

The band toured in the fall of 2011 with Anthrax and Death Angel. Overkill was invited to the tour, but due to the pre-production of their sixteenth studio album The Electric Age, they did not participate. John Tempesta filled in for Bostaph on the tour. It was announced on December 1, 2011 that Bostaph had once again left Testament. Gene Hoglan, who had recorded the drum tracks for the new album, was brought back after the band had expressed pleasure in his playing, hoping that he would continue with the band for the foreseeable future.

After many delays, the band's eleventh studio album Dark Roots of Earth was released on July 27, 2012. The album debuted at No. 12 on the Billboard 200, their highest chart position to date. Lamb of God drummer Chris Adler made a guest appearance on the bonus track "A Day in the Death".

=== Dark Roots of Thrash and Brotherhood of the Snake (2013–2019) ===
In August 2012, Peterson stated that Testament would record a twelfth studio album if Dark Roots of Earth did well. A week prior to the release of Dark Roots of Earth, Billy promised that Testament would not take "huge gaps" between albums anymore, and would "work hard and tour for two years or so", and try to release another album when they could. Hoglan had also said that he would "absolutely dig" to be a part of the songwriting of the next Testament album.

On September 13, 2013, Billy told Rock Overdose that from January to April 2014, Testament would be writing and recording their eleventh studio album for a 2014 release. Testament released a live DVD/double album Dark Roots of Thrash on October 15, 2013. The release documents the band's sold-out headlining performance at the Paramount in Huntington, New York, in February 2013.

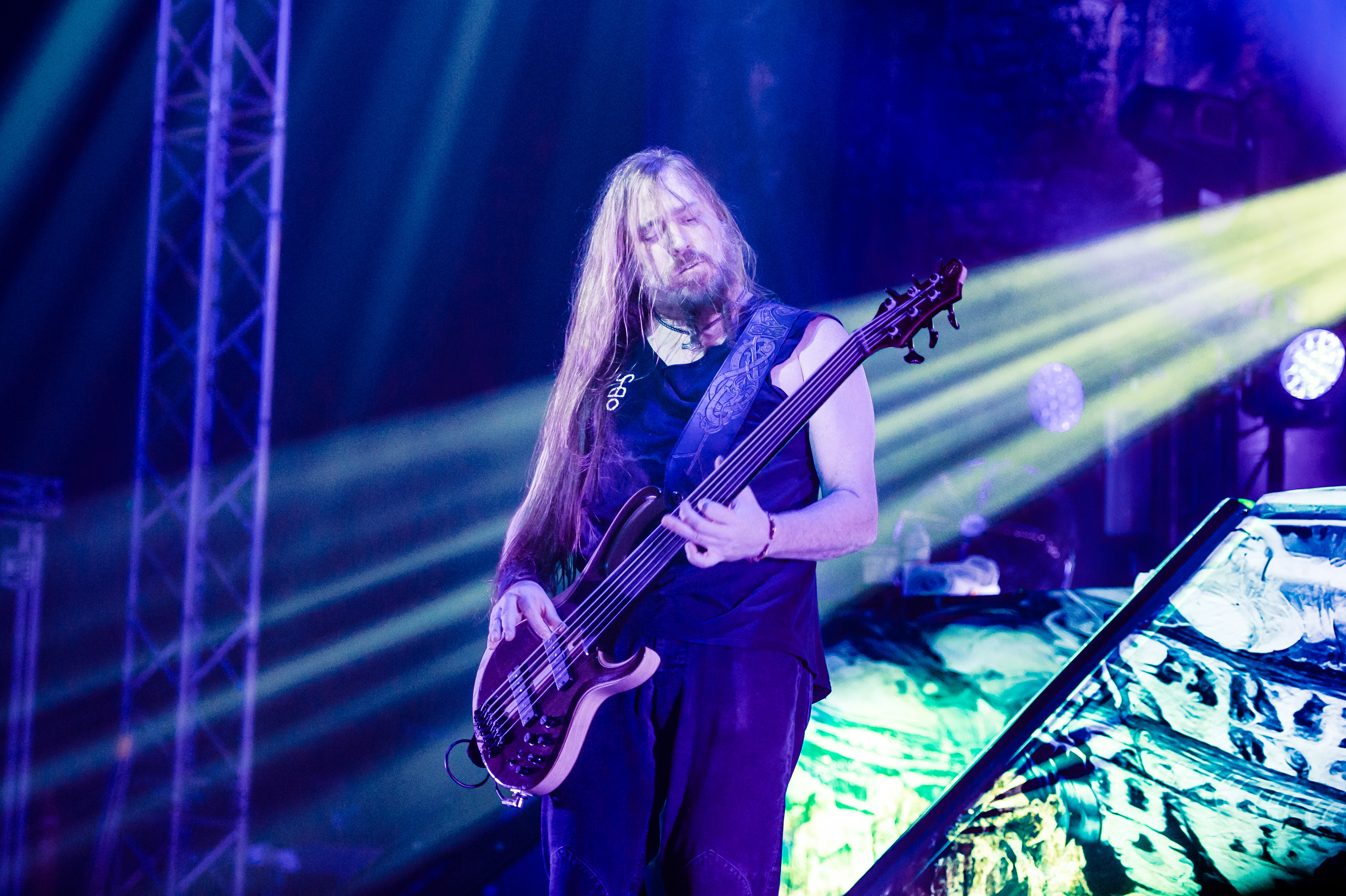
Bassist Steve Di Giorgio, who had left in 2005, returned to Testament in 2014, taking over from his replacement Greg Christian.

In January 2014, bassist Greg Christian left Testament again, and was replaced by a returning Steve Di Giorgio. Christian has stated that the reasons behind his departure were because of money disputes and differences with the band.

When asked in an April 2015 interview about Testament's plans to begin recording their twelfth album, Peterson said that his "main goal" was to "get home [from tour] in June, finish it up and get in the studio by September." Billy also said that the band's goal was to have the album finished by Thanksgiving. Slovenian bassist Tilen Hudrap (Pestilence, U.D.O., Vicious Rumors, Paradox, Doro (live), Thraw...) and Bay Area drummer Alex Bent (Arkaik, Hatriot, Decrepit Birth and Battlecross) filled in for Di Giorgio and Hoglan respectively at the prestigious Canadian open-air festival Heavy Montréal in August 2015, which was attended by more than 70,000 spectators. Other bands that appeared with Testament on the 2015 edition of HMTL were Gojira, Lamb of God, Slipknot, Faith No More, Neurosis, Arch Enemy, Abbath, Ihsahn etc. Both Hudrap and Bent continued to work with Eric Peterson and appeared on his solo single "Winter Sun", released in December 2015, as well as on the Dragonlord studio album ''Dominion''. Hudrap later joined the iconic German singer Udo Dirkschneider, while Bent joined Trivium.

In May 2016, Billy confirmed their twelfth album would be called Brotherhood of the Snake. Of the album's lyrical content, he commented, "The Brotherhood of the Snake was actually a society about 6,000 years ago that debarred all religions. It was just a fascinating topic that caught our eye and attention and spawned a lot of songs. We're going with that vibe. There will be some songs that deviate, but the majority will be around that and aliens and religion. Then I'll probably tap into my native heritage and write some songs about that. It's not just going to be one concept, but there is some interesting stuff that we're finding to write about." Brotherhood of the Snake was released on October 28, 2016, and received generally positive reviews from critics, and scored Testament their second-highest chart position on the Billboard 200, peaking at number twenty. Shortly after its release, Testament embarked on an international tour with Amon Amarth, and toured North America in April–May 2017 with Sepultura, Prong, Infernal Tenebra and Dying Gorgeous Lies. The band also toured Europe with Annihilator and Death Angel in November and December 2017, and again in March and April 2018, with Annihilator and Vader supporting. Along with Anthrax, Lamb of God, Behemoth and Napalm Death, Testament opened for Slayer on their final North American tour, which took place throughout the spring and summer of 2018. Testament also performed at Megadeth's first-ever cruise called Megacruise in October 2019.

=== Titans of Creation, touring and Para Bellum (2019–2025) ===
By March 2017, Testament had begun writing the follow-up to Brotherhood of the Snake, with plans to release it in 2018. Billy stated in March 2018 that Testament would start working on their thirteenth studio album after finishing touring in support of Brotherhood of the Snake in August, hoping not to repeat the four-year gaps between their previous three albums. He later stated that opening for Slayer on their farewell tour would be "the final lap for [them] touring" in support of Brotherhood of the Snake. Work on the follow-up album began in February 2019, and pre-production began in May with Andy Sneap as the mixer. Drummer Gene Hoglan revealed in a June 2019 interview on the "Talk Toomey" podcast that the band had finished recording the album for a 2019 or early 2020 release. Peterson later stated that it would be released in January 2020.

The band, along with Exodus and Death Angel, took part in The Bay Strikes Back tour of Europe in February and March 2020. Following the tour, Chuck Billy and his wife Tiffany tested positive for COVID-19, making him the third person to have contracted the virus during the tour following Will Carroll of Death Angel and Gary Holt of Exodus. Bassist Steve Di Giorgio was later diagnosed with COVID-19, becoming the second member of Testament to have tested positive for the condition.

Testament released their thirteenth studio album Titans of Creation on April 3, 2020. They were due to headline a North America tour to promote the album, with support provided by The Black Dahlia Murder, Municipal Waste and Meshiaak, but it was postponed due to the COVID-19 pandemic. For this reason, Testament did not tour in support of Titans of Creation for over a-year-and-a-half; touring for the album was scheduled to start in the fall of 2021, with the band resuming their Bay Strikes Back tour in North America with Exodus and Death Angel, but the COVID-19 pandemic led to its postponement to the spring of 2022. Following this was a summer European tour, which included festival appearances, as well as headlining dates with Exodus, Death Angel and Heathen, and one with Sepultura, and then the second North American leg of the Bay Strikes Back tour in the fall. The band also co-headlined the Klash of the Titans tour in Latin America with Kreator in the spring of 2023, followed by a European tour with Voivod, and dates in Asia with Exodus and Death Angel. On some dates of the latter tour, Phil Demmel (formerly of Vio-lence and Machine Head) stepped in for guitarist Alex Skolnick, as the latter had sat out in order to tend to a family emergency.

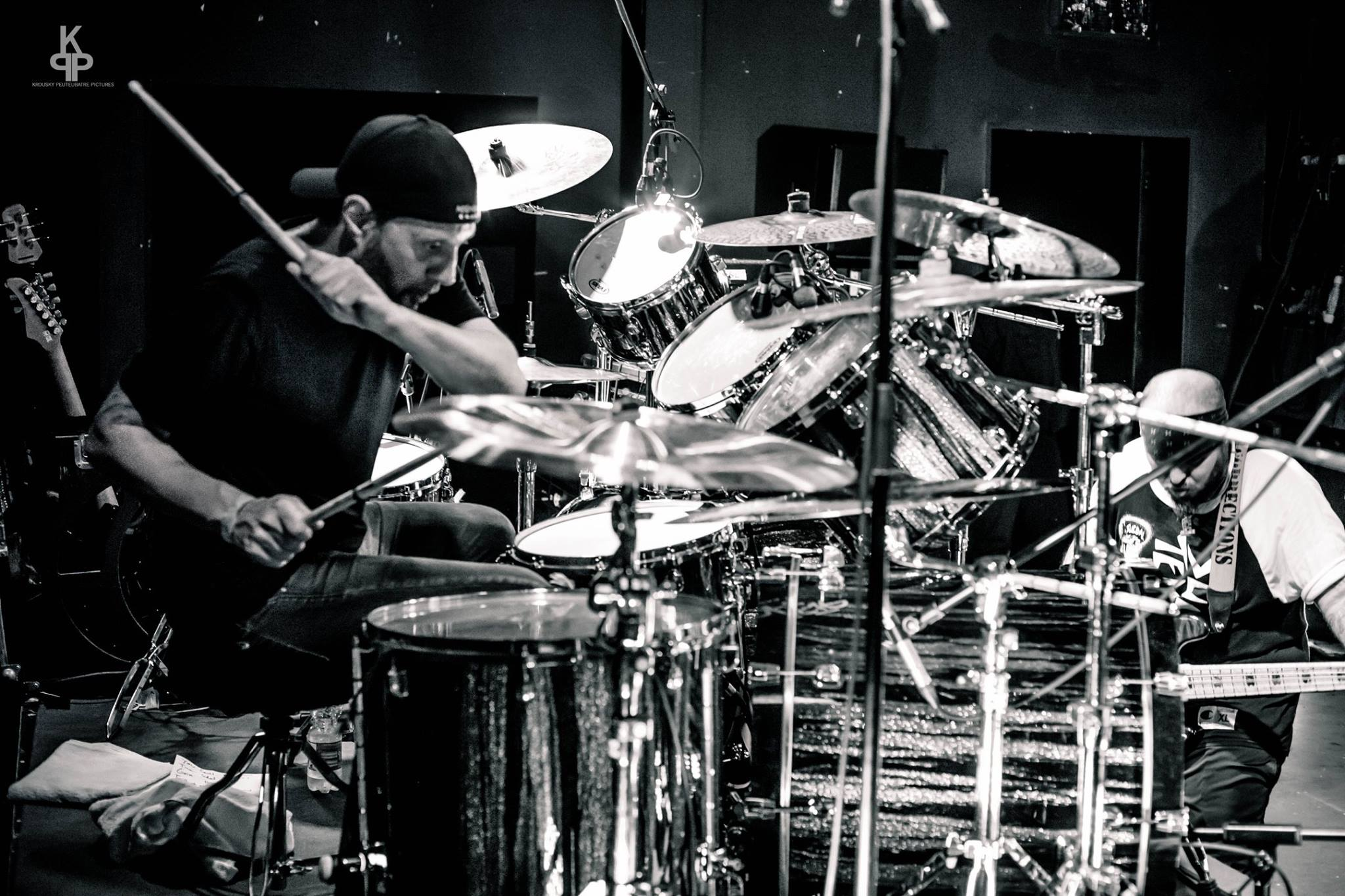
Drummer Dave Lombardo, who appeared on Testament's eighth studio album The Gathering, rejoined the band in 2022 as the replacement of Gene Hoglan before he was replaced by Chris Dovas in the following year.

As early as mid-2020, the members of Testament began discussing the possibility of making a fourteenth studio album. In an interview in May of that year with former Exodus and original Legacy frontman Steve "Zetro" Souza on his Toxic Vault video channel, Billy was asked if he was going to write another Testament album during the COVID-19 pandemic. His response was, "We're not writing a record yet. I won't release what we're doing, but we are gonna write some stuff. Just to do something, not a record but maybe something just to have some singles." Billy and Peterson stated interviews during 2020 and 2021 that the band would begin working on new material for its next album during their downtime and before they could tour in support of Titans of Creation.

On January 21, 2022, the band and longtime drummer Gene Hoglan announced on their respective social media accounts that he had once again left Testament to pursue "an exciting new chapter of [his] career and free agency, with all that it will entail." On March 1, it was announced that drummer Dave Lombardo had rejoined the band in time for the North American leg of The Bay Strikes Back tour, which became Testament's first major outing with Lombardo, who had left the band before the 1999–2000 tour for The Gathering. The band later discussed the possibility of recording a new album with Lombardo, and Billy stated in September 2022 that the band would likely begin work on it after the conclusion of The Bay Strikes Back tour. In April 2023, Lombardo announced that he would not be joining Testament throughout their 2023 tour dates, giving scheduling conflicts as the reason and expressing uncertainty that he would return to the band afterwards. He was officially replaced by former Seven Spires drummer Chris Dovas, who had filled in for Lombardo for a few U.S. dates the previous fall.

Plans for Testament to go into the studio to record their fourteenth album in 2022 were pushed back to 2023 and later to 2024, due to their grueling tour schedules as well as members of the band continuing to write new material. It was announced in June 2023 that Testament had renewed their deal with Nuclear Blast for three more albums, and the label had acquired the rights to the band's first six studio albums for future reissues. In December of that year, Testament began tracking their new album with mastering engineer Justin Shturtz at Sterling Sound in Nashville, but progress was slow, with Di Giorgio confirming in March 2024 that pre-production on the album had begun, and Billy revealing in June that "most of the drums" were recorded. The band members later announced that their new album would not be released until 2025.

Testament released remastered versions of The Legacy and The New Order on July 12, 2024. In support of those remasters, the band co-headlined the North American leg of the Klash of the Titans tour with Kreator in September–October 2024 (with Possessed as the supporting act), followed by a Europe that November–December, where Testament opened for Kreator and Anthrax. Prior to those tours, they supported Behemoth on their O Father, O Satan, O Svmmer European tour during the summer of 2024. To celebrate the belated 35th anniversary of Practice What You Preach, Testament embarked on "an evening with" tour in the U.S. in April–May 2025 which saw the band perform that album in its entirety. They also headlined a tour of Latin America that August.

On August 19, 2025, Testament released the first single titled "Infanticide A.I." from their then-untitled fourteenth album, being streamed exclusively on SiriusXM Liquid Metal with Jose Mangin. Two days later, they revealed Para Bellum as the title of their new album, which was released on October 10, 2025. Para Bellum charted in the top 50 in multiple countries and received positive reviews, being dubbed the metal album of the year by Loudwire. In support of the album, the band co-headlined a European tour with Obituary in the fall, with support from Destruction and Nervosa, and also headlined a U.S. tour in March and April 2026 with Destruction and Overkill, which was followed by a European tour that summer (with Death Angel, Metal Church, Armored Saint and Hellripper supporting on select dates). They will also be headlining a Latin America tour in the late 2026 with Municipal Waste and Immolation serving as the supporting acts, and supporting Megadeth on their final tour in Europe and Meshuggah on their 40th anniversary tour in North America throughout the winter and spring of 2027.

=== Upcoming fifteenth studio album (2025–present) ===
In an interview with Knotfest.com, published three days after the release of Para Bellum, Billy said that Peterson and Dovas were already working on new material for the next Testament album, with a potential release date of 2027: "We're shooting to do another record next year. That's the goal." In February 2026, Billy revealed that Peterson and Dovas have "about six more tunes ready to go" for the follow-up to Para Bellum. In the following month, Billy reiterated the band's progress on new music, and said, "We're hoping maybe get out in '27 to pop into the studio and make another record. We don't know yet, but we're not waiting four or five years. We're ready to pop 'em out now." Billy confirmed in August 2026 that the band had "close to nine tracks" worked on for their upcoming fifteenth studio album, and expressed hope of recording it in the summer of 2027 for release later in the year or in 2028 as opposed to another four-to-five-years.

== Artistry ==
=== Musical style and lyrics ===
Inspired by the new wave of British heavy metal (NWOBHM) and local Bay Area music scenes, Testament has been credited as one of the leaders of the second wave of thrash metal in the late 1980s, as well as one of the most influential Bay Area thrash metal bands. In 1991, Joe Gore of Guitar Player described the band as "a Northern California riff-in-E-or-die metal quintet", while AllMusic referred to them as "one of the first thrash acts to emerge from the Bay Area in Metallica's wake during the '80s." In 1989, Brad Tolinski of Guitar World wrote, "More than any other band, Testament can be seen as the missing link between heavy and speed metal. Their use of gothic imagery, minor keys and copious guitar heroics can easily be traced to the Dio/Ozzy/Iron Maiden/Sabbath school of rock apocalypse." Loudwire stated that "the band brought more cerebral guitar work, dynamic songwriting and fresh take on thrash singing."

Testament's musical and lyrical styles have changed substantially over the years, with vocalist Chuck Billy noting that the band has evolved into more than just a thrash metal band. Their first two albums, The Legacy and The New Order, were increasingly influenced by bands of the thrash metal movement of the mid-1980s. Both albums touched upon gothic and occult themes, while other albums like their third, Practice What You Preach, saw them write about political issues, hypocrisy and greed. While Testament did not radically alter its thrash metal style on Practice What You Preach and its follow-ups Souls of Black and The Ritual, those albums saw the band draw melodic and technical influences ranging from progressive rock, traditional heavy metal and jazz fusion, while the latter album also saw them incorporate a more commercial, radio-friendly style to their music. For their sixth album Low, Testament incorporated a diverse array of influences into its sound such as death metal, groove metal, alternative metal and black metal, while the album retained some of the melodic and technical sounds of its predecessors. The band continued their experimentation with death metal on their next two albums, Demonic and The Gathering, while the latter was also more of a return to their early thrash metal sound. Testament has since returned to its thrash roots though they have experimented with other sounds, including elements of progressive metal on Dark Roots of Earth, and influences of blackened death metal and melodic death metal on Para Bellum.

Testament was influenced by Aerosmith, AC/DC, Angel Witch, the Beatles, Black Sabbath, Boston, Deep Purple, Def Leppard, Dio, Exodus, Genesis, Iron Maiden, Judas Priest, King Crimson, Kiss, Led Zeppelin, Mercyful Fate, Metallica, the Michael Schenker Group, Montrose, Ozzy Osbourne, Raven, Rush, Samson, Saxon, Scorpions, Slayer, the Sweet, Thin Lizzy, UFO, Van Halen, Venom and Watchtower, and also guitarists and vocalists Jeff Beck, Chuck Berry, Jimi Hendrix, Yngwie Malmsteen, Frank Marino, Mahogany Rush, Pat Travers and Johnny Winter.

=== Legacy and influence ===
Testament is considered to be part of the "Big Eight" of thrash metal, along with Metallica, Megadeth, Slayer, Anthrax, Exodus, Overkill and Death Angel. Malcolm Dome of Metal Hammer wrote, "It should have been The Big Five. It's unthinkable now, but the 'Big Four' of Metallica, Megadeth, Slayer and Anthrax came close to an expansion, with Testament seemingly set to ride hard to glory in the late 80s." Dom Lawson of Blabbermouth praised Testament's longevity and contributions to the thrash metal revival movement, stating that the band—along with "the similarly vital likes of" Exodus and Kreator—has "been instrumental in keeping thrash metal's older generation at the forefront of the modern scene." Their first two albums, The Legacy and The New Order, have regularly been listed among the best albums within the thrash metal genre.

Testament has influenced multiple bands, such as Slipknot, Pantera, Sepultura, Death Angel, Annihilator, White Zombie, Korn, Machine Head, Limp Bizkit, Hatebreed, Drowning Pool, Kataklysm, Lamb of God, Morbid Angel, Cannibal Corpse, Entombed, Gojira, Killswitch Engage, Exhorder, Havok, Evile, Blind Guardian, Sevendust, Suicidal Angels, Trivium, Nightwish, Shadows Fall, Terror, Unearth, Skeletonwitch, Warbringer, Primal Fear, Fight, Sons of Texas, Incite, Demolition Hammer, and Forced Entry.

In 2016, Loudwire ranked Testament the 19th greatest metal band of all time. In 2019, Testament was inducted into The Heavy Metal Hall of History for their impact on the thrash and overall metal genre. In a 2021, Revolver magazine fan poll, Testament was voted number one as best non-"Big Four" thrash band. In 2025, Zahra Huselid of Screen Rant ranked the band at number one on the site's list of "10 Best Thrash Metal Bands Who Weren't The Big Four".

== Band members ==
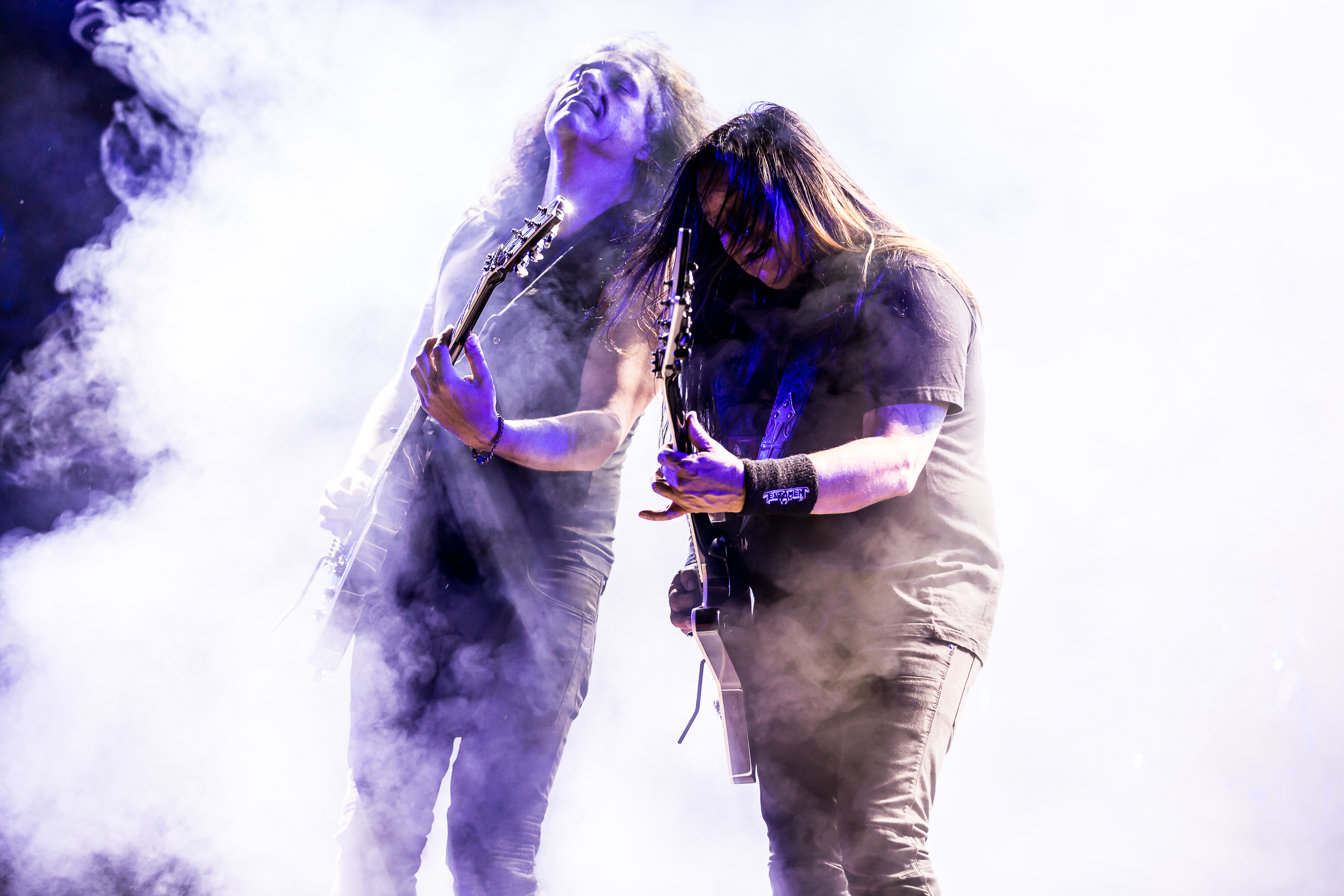
Guitarists Alex Skolnick and Eric Peterson performing in 2019.

Current

- Eric Peterson – rhythm and lead guitar, backing vocals (1983–present)
- Alex Skolnick – lead and rhythm guitar, backing vocals (1985–1992, 2005–present)
- Chuck Billy – lead vocals (1986–present)
- Steve Di Giorgio – bass (1998–2005, 2014–present), backing vocals (2014–present)
- Chris Dovas – drums (2022, 2023–present)

== Discography ==
- The Legacy (1987)
- The New Order (1988)
- Practice What You Preach (1989)
- Souls of Black (1990)
- The Ritual (1992)
- Low (1994)
- Demonic (1997)
- The Gathering (1999)
- First Strike Still Deadly (2001)
- The Formation of Damnation (2008)
- Dark Roots of Earth (2012)
- Brotherhood of the Snake (2016)
- Titans of Creation (2020)
- Para Bellum (2025)

== Awards and nominations ==
American Indian Film Festival Awards

Year	Nominee / work	Award	Result	By
2012S	"Native Blood"	Best Music Video	Won	

City of Albuquerque, New Mexico

Year	Nominee / work	Award	Result
2024	Testament	Keys to the city	Won

Decibel Hall of Fame

Year	Nominee / work	Award	Result
2018	The Legacy	Decibel Hall of Fame	Inducted
2019	The New Order	Decibel Hall of Fame	Inducted

Loudwire Music Awards

Year	Nominee / work	Award	Result
2012	Alex Skolnick	Best Guitarist	Nominated
2017	Alex Skolnick / Eric Peterson	Best Guitarist	Nominated
2017	Gene Hoglan	Drummer of the Year	Nominated
2025	Para Bellum	Metal Album of the Year	Won

Metal Hammer Golden Gods Awards

Year	Nominee / work	Award	Result
2008	The Formation of Damnation	Best Album	Won

Metal Hammer Germany Awards

Year	Nominee / work	Award	Result
2017	"Brotherhood of the Snake"	Metal Anthem	Nominated
2018	Testament	Best Live Act	Nominated

Metal Storm Awards

Year	Nominee / work	Award	Result
2008	The Formation of Damnation	Best Thrash Metal Album	Won
2012	Dark Roots of Earth	Best Thrash Metal Album	Nominated
2012	"Powerslave"	Best Cover Song	Nominated
2012	"Native Blood"	Best Video	Nominated
2016	Brotherhood of the Snake	Best Thrash Metal Album	Nominated
2016	Brotherhood of the Snake	Best Cover Art	Nominated
2020	Titans of Creation	Best Thrash Metal Album	Nominated

The Metal Hall of Fame

Year	Nominee / work	Award	Result
2019	Testament	The Metal Hall of Fame	Inducted
