= Death Angel discography =

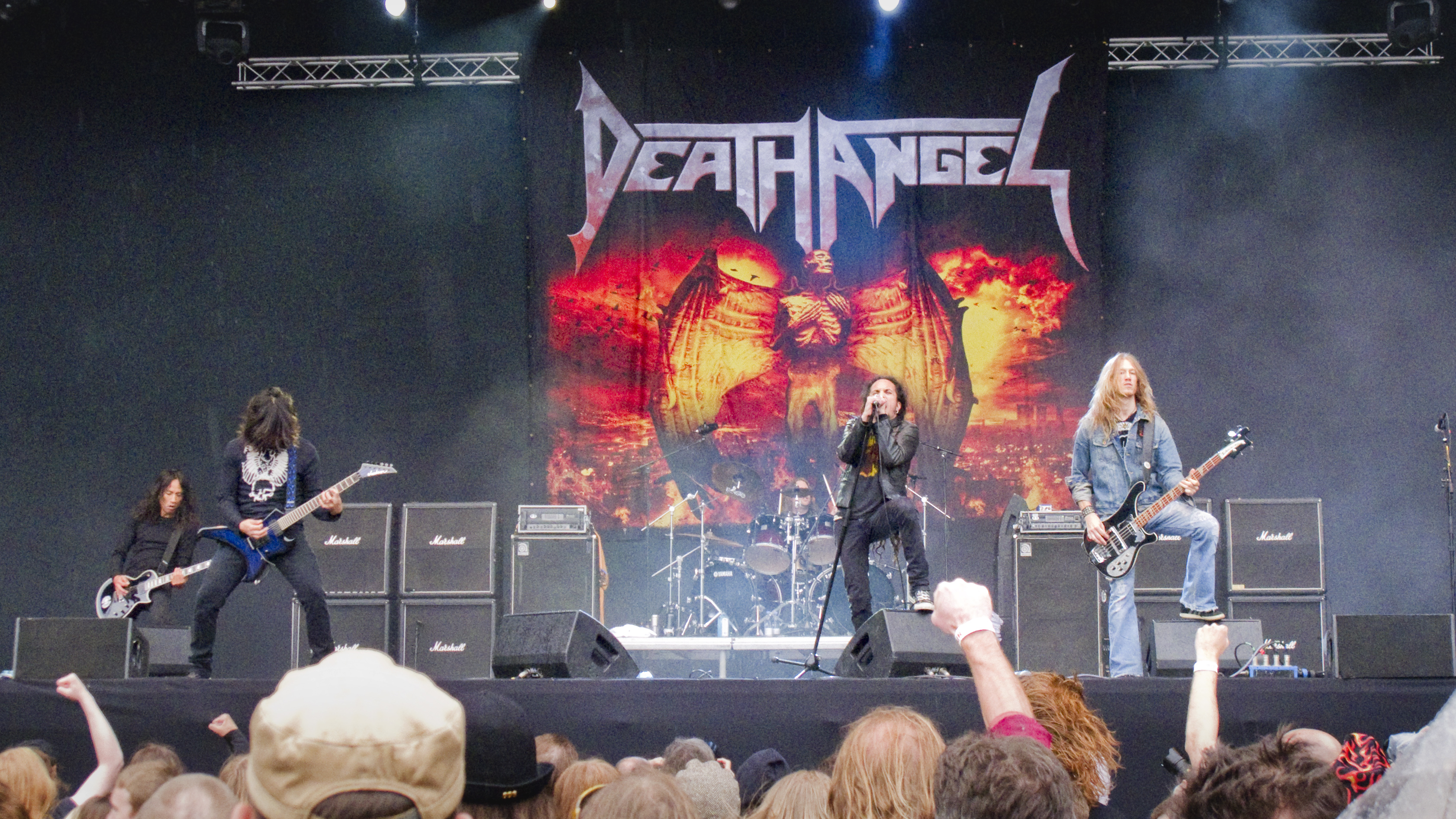
- Death Angel performing in 2010
- Studio albums: 9
- EPs: 1
- Live albums: 2
- Compilation albums: 3
- Singles: 7
- Music videos: 10
- Demo albums: 2

The discography of Death Angel, an American thrash metal band, consists of nine studio albums, one EP, two live albums, two compilation albums, seven singles, ten music videos and two demo cassettes. Death Angel was formed in the San Francisco Bay Area in 1982 by guitarists Rob Cavestany and Gus Pepa, bassist Dennis Pepa and drummer Andy Galeon. The lead vocalist position was originally filled by Dennis Pepa, until Mark Osegueda became the band's permanent singer in 1984.

After releasing two demo tapes, Heavy Metal Insanity (1983) and Kill as One (1985), the band signed with the independent label Enigma Records and released its debut full-length album, The Ultra-Violence, in 1987, followed a year later by Frolic through the Park (1988); both albums were minor successes in the United States and Europe. In 1989, Death Angel signed with Geffen Records, and released its only album for the major label, Act III, in the following year. Act III failed to chart in the United States, but enjoyed some success in Europe, including France, Belgium and Switzerland.

Death Angel's first live album, Fall from Grace, was also released in 1990, but did not appear on any charts. In 1991, the band broke up, due to Galeon seriously injured from a bus accident, but reformed ten years later with a new lineup. Death Angel subsequently signed to the German independent label Nuclear Blast, and released The Art of Dying, their first studio album in 14 years, in 2004. The band has since released five more studio albums and one EP.

== Studio albums ==
Year	Album details	Peak chart positions								
Year	Album details	US	US Heat.	US Ind.	BEL (WA)	CHE	FRA	GER	HUN	NLD
1987	The Ultra-Violence: Released: April 23, 1987; Label: Enigma; Formats: CD, CS, DI	—	—	—	—	—	—	—	—	58
1988	Frolic through the Park: Released: July 5, 1988; Label: Enigma; Formats: CD, CS, DI	143	—	—	65	—	—	22	37	48
1990	Act III: Released: April 10, 1990; Label: Geffen; Formats: CD, DI	—	—	—	32	88	17	—	58	72
2004	The Art of Dying: Released: May 4, 2004; Label: Nuclear Blast; Formats: CD, LP, DI	—	—	50	—	—	—	—	—	—
2008	Killing Season: Released: February 26, 2008; Label: Nuclear Blast; Formats: CD, LP, DI	—	21	—	—	—	—	59	—	56
2010	Relentless Retribution: Released: September 14, 2010; Label: Nuclear Blast; Formats: CD, DI	—	10	48	86	70	95	45	9	—
2013	The Dream Calls for Blood: Released: October 15, 2013; Label: Nuclear Blast; Formats: CD, DI	72	—	17	117	—	161	59	—	—
2016	The Evil Divide: Released: May 27, 2016; Label: Nuclear Blast; Formats: CD, DI	98	—	7	—	40	110	37	—	—
2019	Humanicide: Released: May 31, 2019; Label: Nuclear Blast; Formats: CD, DI	—	—	3	94	21	132	19	—	—
"—" denotes a release that did not chart.

== EPs ==
Year	Album details
2020	Under Pressure: Released: October 9, 2020; Label: Nuclear Blast; Formats: DI

== Compilation albums ==
Year	Album details
2005	Archives and Artifacts: Released: February 1, 2005; Label: Restless; Formats: CD
2007	The Long Road Home: Released: 2007; Label: Nuclear Blast; Formats: CD
2020	The Enigma Years (1987–1990): Released: October 30, 2020; Label: HNE Recordings Ltd; Formats: CD

== Live albums ==
Year	Album details
1990	Fall from Grace: Released: November 19, 1990; Label: Enigma; Formats: CD
2009	Sonic German Beatdown – Live in Germany: Released: July 28, 2009; Label: Nuclear Blast; Formats: CD, LP, DI
2015	The Bay Calls for Blood (Live in San Francisco): Label: Nuclear Blast; Formats: LP, DI
2021	The Bastard Tracks: Label: Nuclear Blast; Formats: CD, LP, DI

== Demo albums ==
Year	Album details
1983	Heavy Metal Insanity: Released: 1983; Formats: CS
1985	Kill as One: Released: 1985; Formats: CS
1990	Act III: Released: 1990; Formats: CS

== Singles ==
Year	Song	Album
1988	"Bored"	Frolic through the Park
1990	"Seemingly Endless Time"	Act III
1990	"A Room with a View"	Act III
2004	"Thrown to the Wolves"	The Art of Dying
2008	"Dethroned"	Killing Season
2008	"Sonic Beatdown"	Killing Season
2010	"Truce"	Relentless Retribution
2025	"Wrath (Bring Fire)"	Non-album single
2025	"Cult of the Used"	Non-album single

== Music videos ==
Year	Song	Director
1987	"Voracious Souls"	
1988	"Bored"	
1990	"Seemingly Endless Time"	
1990	"A Room with a View"	
2004	"Thicker Than Blood"	
2008	"Dethroned"	Robert Sexton
2010	"Truce"	Robert Sexton
2011	"River of Rapture"	Tommy Jones
2014	"Left for Dead"	
2014	"The Dream Calls for Blood"	
2016	"Hatred United / United Hate"	Tommy Jones
2016	"Lost"	Tommy Jones
2017	"Breakaway" (lyric video)	
2019	"The Pack" (lyric video)	
2019	"I Came for Blood"	JayLaced Productions
2019	"Immortal Behated"	Tricia Aguilar, Jonathan Alegre, Eric Larsen
2020	"Under Pressure"	Tricia Aguilar
2020	"Aggressor"	Ben Clarkson
2026	"Wrath (Bring Fire)"	Edgar Salazar

== Other appearances ==
- Metallic Attack: Metallica – The Ultimate Tribute album ("Trapped Under Ice") (2004)
- Alone in the Dark movie soundtrack ("The Devil Incarnate") (2005)
- Metal Swim – Adult Swim compilation album ("Truce") (2010)

== Videography ==
- Sonic German Beatdown – Live in Germany (DVD, 2009)
