= Prague Death Mass =

Prague Death Mass is a three-day musical festival focused on extreme metal, held at the Prague Planetarium in Prague, Czech Republic during the fall. It was founded in 2012. Notable acts who have played at this festival include Mortuary Drape, Mare, Diocletian, Dead Congregation, Djevel, Aborym and Misotheist.

== See also ==
- Shamrock Slaughter
- Flatline Fest
- Metal Threat
- Hell's Heroes
- Milwaukee Metal Fest
- A389 Bash
- Toledo Death Fest
