= Para Bellum (album) =

Studio album by Testament
- Released: October 10, 2025
- Recorded: May–December 2024
- Studios: Trident; Dragon Lair; Skol Productions; Classic Recording Bristol
- Genres: Thrash metal; blackened death metal
- Length: 50:24
- Label: Nuclear Blast
- Producers: Chuck Billy; Eric Peterson

Testament chronology
Titans of Creation (2020)	Para Bellum (2025)

Singles from Para Bellum
- 1. "Infanticide A.I." Released: August 21, 2025; 2. "Shadow People" Released: September 12, 2025

Para Bellum is the fourteenth studio album by the American thrash metal band Testament, released on October 10, 2025, through Nuclear Blast. It is the band's first studio album with drummer Chris Dovas. The name of the album is Latin for prepare for war. It is part of a Latin adage, Si vis pacem, para bellum (translated as "If you want peace, prepare for war").

Stylistically, the album is a mixture of thrash metal, death metal and black metal, while one of the album's tracks, "Meant to Be", incorporates elements of orchestral and progressive music. It was dubbed metal album of the year by Loudwire.

== Background and production ==
As early as mid-2020, the members of Testament began discussing the possibility of making a fourteenth studio album. About a month after the release of Titans of Creation, frontman Chuck Billy spoke to former Exodus and Legacy frontman Steve "Zetro" Souza on his "Toxic Vault" video channel about the possibility of the band writing a potential follow-up album during the COVID-19 pandemic, saying, "We're not writing a record yet. I won't release what we're doing, but we are gonna write some stuff. Just to do something, not a record but maybe something just to have some singles." In a July 2020 interview with Australia's Riff Crew, Billy commented on his take on the possibility of writing another Testament album during the pandemic, saying, "Well, if it is truly, as someone says, a two-year period, of course, we're gonna go write another record, and when it all settles, we'll have two records… And if it had to be that long, then, yeah, we would probably consider just writing another record." Peterson reiterated Billy's comments the following month that the band could work on new material before beginning to tour in support of Titans of Creation. In a March 2021 interview on Alive & Streaming, an internet podcast hosted by Death Angel guitarist Ted Aguilar, Billy confirmed that Peterson had begun writing new material for what could result in the next Testament album.

On January 21, 2022, the band and longtime drummer Gene Hoglan announced on their respective social media accounts that he had once again left Testament to pursue "an exciting new chapter of [his] career and free agency, with all that it will entail." On March 1, it was announced that drummer Dave Lombardo had rejoined the band in time for the North American leg of The Bay Strikes Back tour, which became Testament's first major outing with Lombardo, who had left the band before the 1999–2000 tour for The Gathering. The band later discussed the possibility of recording a new album with Lombardo, and Billy stated in September 2022 that the band would likely begin work on it after the conclusion of The Bay Strikes Back tour. He later stated that he hoped they would begin recording their new album towards the end of 2023 for a 2024 release. When asked in a June 2023 during their appearance at Hellfest when the album would be recorded, Peterson said, "Hopefully maybe October, November. If not, probably January, February. But we're shooting for this year — at the end of the year. I think I'll be done writing in September. So we just have to wait for vocals. Which can take a while. But we'll see what happens." It was announced the same month that Testament had renewed their deal with Nuclear Blast for three more albums, and the label had acquired the rights to the band's first six studio albums for future reissues. Work on the new album resumed in July 2023, with Peterson describing its direction as a combination of thrash, NWOBHM, "thrash black [and] heavy hard rock blues", and it was announced nearly two weeks later that the songwriting process of the album had begun. By December 2023, Testament had begun tracking their new album with mastering engineer Justin Shturtz at Sterling Sound in Nashville, but progress was slow, with Di Giorgio confirming in March 2024 that pre-production on the album had begun, and Billy revealing in June that "most of the drums" were recorded. The band members later announced that their new album would not be released until 2025.

In April 2023, Lombardo announced that he would not be joining Testament throughout their 2023 tour dates, giving scheduling conflicts as the reason and expressing uncertainty that he would return to the band afterwards. He was officially replaced by former Seven Spires drummer Chris Dovas, who had filled in for Lombardo for a few U.S. dates the previous fall.

== Release and promotion ==
On August 19, 2025, Testament released the first single titled "Infanticide A.I." from their then-untitled fourteenth album, being streamed exclusively on SiriusXM Liquid Metal with Jose Mangin. Two days later, they revealed Para Bellum as the title of their new album. "Infanticide A.I." music video was later released on September 4. The albums second single "Shadow People" was released on September 12, the songs animated video was created by Freakshot Films. The album itself released on October 10, alongside an animated music video for the track "High Noon." In support of the album, the band co-headlined a European tour with Obituary in the fall, with support from Destruction and Nervosa, and also headlined a U.S. tour in March and April 2026 with Destruction and Overkill, which will be followed by a European tour that summer (with Death Angel, Metal Church, Armored Saint and Hellripper supporting on select dates). They will also be headlining a Latin America tour in the late 2026 with Municipal Waste and Immolation serving as the supporting acts.

== Reception ==
Professional ratings
Review scores
Source	Rating
Blabbermouth.net	9/10
Brave Words & Bloody Knuckles	8.5/10
Distorted Sound	6/10
KNAC	4.5/5 stars
Metal Storm	8/10
Sputnikmusic	4/5 stars
Metal Hammer	4.5/5 stars
Metal.de	8/10

Para Bellum has received generally positive reviews. Dom Lawson of Blabbermouth.net gave the album a rating of nine out of ten, and wrote, "Along with the similarly vital likes of Exodus and Kreator, the Bay Area band have been instrumental in keeping thrash metal's older generation at the forefront of the modern scene. But even taking into account the self-evident quality of records like The Formation of Damnation and Titans of Creation, Testament still have the hunger to achieve more. Their 14th studio effort positively reeks of a desire to push thrash forward, to make it darker and more imaginative, and to dismantle any and all restrictions on what the genre can be. Para Bellum is a fucking monster."

KNAC.com contributor Rocky Kessenger declared Para Bellum to be "proof that heavy metal ages better when it's forged in fire." Elsewhere in his review, Kessenger said, "The front half burns fast and loud, the back half leans on atmosphere and melody, and together they form one of the band's most dynamic albums in years. There are moments that pull back from the edge, but never once does it sound tired. Testament could've easily recycled the old playbook; instead, they took a risk and made something that still feels vital."

Loudwire declared that Para Bellum was the best metal album of 2025. Brian Rolli wrote of the album: "Forty years and 14 albums deep, they sound hungrier and more pissed off than ever." He noted that "fury is apparent from the first notes" of the album's opening track, and that the remainder of the album "rips and roars in similar fashion." Don Lawson of Metal Hammer added "While younger generations fanny around with cynical pop compromises, they're here to break necks." Looking for the best thrash metal album of 2025? Testament have your back with Para Bellum."

=== Accolades ===
Loudwire ranked it number 1 on their list of the 13 best metal albums of 2025, while the Brooklyn Vegan included it on their list of the 33 best metal albums of 2025. MetalSucks listed it among the best albums of 2025, and Metal Injection put Para Bellum at number 22 on their list of the top 25 albums of 2025. It was ranked number 4 on Ultimate Classic Rocks list of the best hard rock / metal albums of 2025. In a poll held by Metal Hammer Para Bellum was voted the 19th best album of 2025.

== Track listing ==
All music is composed by Eric Peterson; "Meant to Be" composed with Alex Skolnick.

Para Bellum track listing
No.	Title	Lyrics	Length
1.	"For the Love of Pain"	Chris Dovas; Eric Peterson	5:35
2.	"Infanticide A.I."	Chuck Billy; Del James	3:27
3.	"Shadow People"	Billy; James	5:45
4.	"Meant to Be"	Billy; James	7:33
5.	"High Noon"	Billy	3:52
6.	"Witch Hunt"	Billy; Steve Souza	4:16
7.	"Nature of the Beast"	Billy; James	4:28
8.	"Room 117"	Billy; James	4:18
9.	"Havana Syndrome"	Billy; Alex Skolnick	4:40
10.	"Para Bellum"	Billy	6:30
Total length:			50:24

== Personnel ==
Credits adapted from the album's liner notes.

=== Testament ===
- Chuck Billy – lead vocals
- Alex Skolnick – guitars
- Eric Peterson – guitars, backing vocals
- Steve Di Giorgio – bass
- Chris Dovas – drums

=== Additional contributors ===
- Chuck Billy – production
- Eric Peterson – production
- Juan Urteaga – co-production, recording
- Jens Bogren – mixing
- Tony Lindgren – mastering
- Johan Martin – mixing assistance
- Eliran Kantor – artwork
- Dave Eggar – string arrangement, orchestration, cello, viola, violin
- Chuck Palmer – string arrangement
- Xavi Morató – violin
- Mike Stephenson – strings recording
- Christy Brown – photo of Chuck Billy
- Rich Haick – photo of Eric Peterson and Steve Di Giorgio
- Kevin Wilson – photo of Alex Skolnick
- Art Partiquin – photo of Chris Dovas

== Charts ==
Chart performance for Para Bellum
Chart (2025)	Peak position
Australian Albums (ARIA)	32
Austrian Albums (Ö3 Austria)	8
Belgian Albums (Ultratop Flanders)	26
Belgian Albums (Ultratop Wallonia)	86
Dutch Albums (Album Top 100)	39
Finnish Albums (Suomen virallinen lista)	27
French Albums (SNEP)	97
French Rock & Metal Albums (SNEP)	4
German Albums (Offizielle Top 100)	10
German Rock & Metal Albums (Offizielle Top 100)	2
Italian Albums (FIMI)	92
Japanese Albums (Oricon)	29
Japanese Download Albums (Billboard Japan)	44
Japanese Rock Albums (Oricon)	6
Japanese Top Albums Sales (Billboard Japan)	26
Norwegian Physical Albums (IFPI Norge)	3
Polish Albums (ZPAV)	8
Scottish Albums (Official Charts)	11
Spanish Albums (PROMUSICAE)	49
Swedish Albums (Sverigetopplistan)	56
Swedish Hard Rock Albums (Sverigetopplistan)	2
Swiss Albums (Schweizer Hitparade)	7
UK Albums Sales (OCC)	12
UK Independent Albums (Official Charts)	4
UK Rock & Metal Albums (Official Charts)	1
US Independent Albums (Billboard)	37
US Top Album Sales (Billboard)	9
US Top Hard Rock Albums (Billboard)	15
