= Mad With Power =

Music festival in Wisconsin

- Genre: Heavy metal, power metal
- Frequency: Annually
- Venue: The Sylvee
- Locations: Madison, Wisconsin, United States
- Years active: 2017–present
- Founder: Ty Christian

Mad With Power is an American music festival held at The Sylvee in Madison, Wisconsin during August focused on underground heavy metal music, particularly "nerdier" offshoots of the genre such as power metal. It was founded in 2017 by Lords of the Trident vocalist Ty Christian.

The festival is traditionally held in venues that offer wide selections of pinball machines. The Capital Times reported on the festival in 2023, where they asked: "What goes better with a heavy metal ball than actual little metal balls?"

== History ==
The festival began in 2017. The festival was originally held at the High Noon Saloon in Madison, and only ran for one day. The festival's founder Ty Christian stated the belief that the wide selection of arcade games and pinball machines at the venue set Mad With Power apart from other heavy music festivals: "Everybody's in a box watching live music. So I wanted to be able to add some value on top of that experience and bring in pinball. I think the people who like power metal and sort of the nerdier genres of metal are probably more likely to be jazzed about playing arcade games and classic pinball."

Firewind and Dream Evil headlined the festival in 2025.

== See also ==
- A389 Bash
- Metal Threat
- Hell's Heroes
- Milwaukee Metal Fest
- Flatline Fest
- Michigan Metal Fest
- Toledo Death Fest
- Shamrock Slaughter
