= A389 Bash =

- Genre: Extreme metal, heavy metal
- Frequency: Annually
- Venue: Sonar Compound, Sidebar
- Location: Baltimore, Maryland
- Founder: Domenic Romeo

A389 Bash is an annual American music festival focused on underground extreme metal, held at the Sonar Compound and at the Sidebar in Baltimore, Maryland.

The event is organized by Pulling Teeth guitarist Domenic Romeo, who is also the founder of A389 Records. The event serves as the label's anniversary celebration, and attracts attendees from across the US. Acts that played the festival in 2012 include Eyehategod, Integrity, Gehenna, Full of Hell and Weekend Nachos. Russian power metal band Catharsis played in 2013. American powerviolence band Despise You has also played this festival.

== See also ==
- Milwaukee Metal Fest
- Shamrock Slaughter
- Flatline Fest
- Metal Threat
- Hell's Heroes
- Prague Death Mass
- Toledo Death Fest
- Mad With Power
