= Archives and Artifacts =

Box set by Death Angel
- Released: February 1, 2005
- Recorded: 1982–1989
- Genre: Thrash metal
- Label: Rykodisc

Death Angel chronology
The Art of Dying (2004)	Archives and Artifacts (2005)	Killing Season (2008)

Professional ratings
Review scores
Source	Rating
AllMusic	4.5/5 stars

Archives and Artifacts (2005) is a box set by the American thrash metal band Death Angel, consisting of remasters of their first two albums The Ultra-Violence and Frolic through the Park, as well as a bonus CD, and a DVD with video recordings of the band and a music video. There was an error in the first pressing of the box set. The bonus tracks meant for Frolic through the Park ended up on The Ultra-Violence disc, while three tunes from the third disc (the "Rarities" disc) ended up as bonus tracks on Frolic through the Park instead. The songs from the "Kill as One" demo tape, which were meant to be a bonus on The Ultra-Violence, were excluded altogether. This error was corrected on the second pressing by Rykodisc.

== Track listing ==
All tracks are written by Rob Cavestany, except where noted.

CD 1: The Ultra-Violence
No.	Title	Writer(s)	Length
1.	"Thrashers"	Cavestany, Dennis Pepa	7:12
2.	"Evil Priest"	Cavestany, Osegueda	4:54
3.	"Voracious Souls"	Cavestany, Osegueda	5:39
4.	"Kill as One"		5:00
5.	"The Ultra-Violence" (instrumental)	Cavestany, D. Pepa	10:33
6.	"Mistress of Pain"		4:04
7.	"Final Death"		6:04
8.	"I.P.F.S."		1:56
9.	"Thrashers" (Demo version)	Cavestany, Pepa	6:44
10.	"Kill as One" (Demo version)	Cavestany, Galeon, Osegueda	3:10
11.	"The Ultra-Violence" (Demo version)	Cavestany, Galeon, Pepa	3:15

CD 2: Frolic through the Park
No.	Title	Lyrics	Music	Length
1.	"3rd Floor"	Mark Osegueda	Rob Cavestany	4:58
2.	"Road Mutants"	Cavestany	Cavestany, Dennis Pepa	3:45
3.	"Why You Do This"	Osegueda	Cavestany	5:33
4.	"Bored"	Cavestany	Cavestany	3:29
5.	"Devil's Metal" (CD bonus track)	Cavestany	Cavestany	5:31
6.	"Confused"	Cavestany	Cavestany, Gus Pepa	7:26
7.	"Guilty of Innocence"	Cavestany	Cavestany	4:26
8.	"Open Up"	Cavestany	Cavestany	5:45
9.	"Shores of Sin"	Cavestany	Cavestany, D. Pepa	6:30
10.	"Cold Gin" (Kiss cover)	Ace Frehley	Frehley	4:23
11.	"Mind Rape"	Andy Galeon	Cavestany	5:32
12.	"Dehumanization"	Cavestany	Cavestany	7:01
13.	"Silent Killer"	Cavestany, Pepa	Cavestany, Pepa	4:22
14.	"Witches of Knave"	Cavestany	Cavestany	5:24

CD 3: Bonus disc
No.	Title	Writer(s)	Length
1.	"Vultures Nest" (demo version)	Cavestany	4:24
2.	"The Hurt"	Cavestany, Galeon	4:13
3.	"Conflict of Interest" (demo version)	Cavestany	5:07
4.	"A Passing Thought" (demo version)	Cavestany	6:59
5.	"Elegy" (demo version)	Cavestany, Galeon, Pepa	4:20
6.	"Aspirations" (demo version)	Cavestany, Osegueda	5:24
7.	"Dismal" (demo version)	Cavestany, Pepa	3:27
8.	"The Morrows Memoirs" (demo version)	Cavestany	4:14
9.	"Samson" (demo version)	Cavestany	2:40
10.	"Frolic Through the Park" (garage recording)	Cavestany	3:29
11.	"Betrayed" (outtake)	Cavestany	3:14

== DVD ==
1. "Death Angel Intro"
2. "Original Electronic Press Kit"
3. "International TV Interview"
4. "Guilty of Innocence (multimedia track)" (Cavestany, Galeon, Osegueda, Pepa, Pepa)
5. "Bored (multimedia track)" (Cavestany, Osegueda)
6. "Voracious Souls (Music Video)" (Cavestany, Galeon, Osegueda)

== Personnel ==
- Mark Osegueda – lead vocals
- Rob Cavestany – lead guitar, backing vocals
- Gus Pepa – rhythm guitar, backing vocals
- Dennis Pepa – bass, backing vocals
- Andy Galeon – drums, backing vocals
