= Killing Season (album) =

Studio album by Death Angel
- Released: February 26, 2008
- Recorded: September–December 2007
- Studio: Studio 606 in Northridge, California
- Genre: Thrash metal
- Length: 47:12
- Label: Nuclear Blast
- Producer: Nick Raskulinecz, Rob Cavestany

Death Angel chronology
Archives and Artifacts (2005)	Killing Season (2008)	Sonic German Beatdown – Live in Germany (2009)

Professional ratings
Review scores
Source	Rating
AllMusic	3.5/5 stars
Chronicles of Chaos	8.5/10
PopMatters	6/10
Rock Hard	9.0/10

Killing Season is the fifth album by the American thrash band Death Angel, released on February 26, 2008. Produced by Nick Raskulinecz (known for his work with Foo Fighters, Rush and Alice in Chains), it is the follow-up to the band's first reunion album, 2004's The Art of Dying, and marked the final Death Angel album to feature founding members Dennis Pepa and Andy Galeon. Killing Season sold around 2,300 copies in its first week in the U.S.

== Background ==
On August 11, 2006, bassist Dennis Pepa spoke to The Gauntlet about the band's plans for a fifth album.

What we spoke about so far, we just want to really write what we are into at the moment. Not like we never do that, but we want to really focus on what makes us happy versus what people are going to think in the scene. With The Art of Dying there was pressure within the band and from our fan base to what they expected from us. So we wrote that album and we weren't as free minded as we'd like to be. With the next CD, it doesn't matter what anybody else thinks. As long as we think it's cool, that's the attitude we plan on taking. It will be heavy regardless; it will sound like a Death Angel album. I think it will be like, but not sounding like Frolic, but have the attitude of Frolic. We wrote that album regardless of what people would think and put out what we were into. It always seemed to be that obscure album. We just took that time period to the extreme and we wrote what we wanted to write and didn't care.

— Dennis Pepa

In February 2007, guitarist Rob Cavestany posted an update on the album. He writes:

We've been jamming out at our studio in Oakland, creating a new album which we plan to release later this year. Good vibes are flowing! Can't wait for you to feel it...

We're pretty much going to lay low on the live shows until we get the album completed. In fact, we did not plan to do any shows at all before summer but then we got invited to play in the Philippines! Pulp Summer Slam Seven takes place at Amoranto Stadium in Manila [on April 28] and we can't wait to hit that outdoor stage in the sizzling heat… it's gonna be insane!

OK, maybe one or two of the summer festivals in Europe; it's torture passing those up!

Other than that, it's all about getting that 'studio tan,' but you can bet your sweet ass that we'll be coming your way after we drop our new disc on ya… I also want to thank each and every one of you who continue to support and enjoy our music. You make us feel so warm and fuzzy.

— Rob Cavestany

On September 8, 2007, Blabbermouth.net reported that Death Angel would enter a studio in Los Angeles on September 16 to begin recording the album and Nick Raskulinecz was confirmed as the producer.

Also in September 2007, Cavestany posted another update on the album.

We are posted up in Los Angeles getting into some serious musical activity. Drove down a week ago and started off with a couple days of final pre-production. We took the songs even further, jamming for hours and digging deep into the details and arrangements. They are now ready to be recorded... let's do this!

We started tracking on Wednesday and it sounds insane! Raw drum tones are huge! Andy is totally ripping it up, best he's ever been! To top it off, we have the most awesome production team yet. Nick, Lou, Fig, John and Dave are totally on top of their shit. Fuckin pros, man!

By Tuesday we should be knee-deep in guitar tracking heaven. Besides all my own gear, there is a shitload of guitars, amps, cabinets, effects and every damn thing to experiment with waiting to be played this week. Can't wait to attack and throw down some axe trax...

Needless to say we are enjoying the process of recording this album to the fullest. We can't wait for you all to hear it. I'll be back with more another progress report in the near future.

— Rob Cavestany

On October 23, 2007, Blabbermouth.net reported that Killing Season would be the title of the album. It was also announced that Cavestany had just posted several photos from the recording studio on his MySpace page.

On February 14, 2008, the entire album became available for streaming on the group's Myspace page.

== Track listing ==
All tracks are written by Andy Galeon, Rob Cavestany, Mark Osegueda, and Dennis Pepa.

No.	Title	Length
1.	"Lord of Hate"	4:23
2.	"Sonic Beatdown"	3:29
3.	"Dethroned"	4:04
4.	"Carnival Justice"	3:09
5.	"Buried Alive"	4:28
6.	"Soulless"	5:07
7.	"The Noose"	3:36
8.	"When Worlds Collide"	4:24
9.	"God vs God"	4:42
10.	"Steal the Crown"	2:57
11.	"Resurrection Machine"	6:59
Total length:		47:12

== Personnel ==
Death Angel

- Mark Osegueda – lead vocals
- Rob Cavestany – lead guitar, backing vocals
- Ted Aguilar – rhythm guitar
- Dennis Pepa – bass, backing vocals
- Andy Galeon – drums, backing vocals

Additional musicians

- Scott Ian, Brian Posehn – backing vocals

Production

- Nick Raskulinecz – production, engineering, mixing
- Rob Cavestany – co-production
- Paul Fig, John Loustenau – engineering
- Brian Gardner – mastering at Bernie Grundman Mastering, Hollywood, CA
- Dennis Pepa – art direction
