= Art of Dying =

Art of Dying may refer to:

- Ars moriendi ("The Art of Dying"), 15th-century Latin text
- Art of Dying (band), Canadian rock band
  - Art of Dying, a 2006 album by Art of Dying
- The Art of Dying, an album by rapper and former Psycho+Logical-Records member Goretex
- The Art of Dying, a 1991 film directed by Wings Hauser
- "Art of Dying" (song), a 1970 song by George Harrison
- The Art of Dying (album), a 2004 album by Death Angel
- The Art of Dying, a 2012 album by Ca$his
- The Art of Dying (film), 2000 Spanish film
- "The Art of Dying", a song by Gojira from the album The Way of All Flesh
