= Milwaukee Metal Fest =

Heavy metal music festival in Wisconsin, U.S.

- Genre: Extreme metal, heavy metal
- Date: May
- Frequency: Annual
- Venue: The Rave/Eagles Ballroom
- Locations: Milwaukee, Wisconsin, United States
- Website: www.milwaukeemetalfestival.com

Milwaukee Metal Fest is a multi-day music festival focused on heavy metal held in Milwaukee, Wisconsin. The festival is traditionally head during the springtime at The Rave/Eagles Ballroom. In 2022 Hatebreed vocalists Jamey Jasta bought the rights to the Milwaukee Metal Fest and brought it back for the first time in 19 years in 2023.

Biohazard, Lamb of God and Anthrax headlined the festival in 2023. Immolation, The Black Dahlia Murder, Terror and Blood Incantation also played. Blind Guardian and Kamelot headlined the festival in 2024. The 2025 lineup featured acts such as Enslaved, Paradise Lost, Between the Buried and Me, Exodus and Death Angel. Acid Bath, Killswitch Engage, and Ministry headlined the event in 2026.

== See also ==
- Flatline Fest
- Shamrock Slaughter
- A389 Bash
- Metal Threat
- Hell's Heroes
- Michigan Metal Fest
- Toledo Death Fest
- Mad With Power
