= Texas Independence Fest =

- Genre: Heavy metal, extreme metal, metalcore, deathcore
- Venue: Grizzly Hall
- Location: Austin, Texas
- Years active: 2008-present
- Founder: Anthony Stevenson
- Website: www.facebook.com/texasindependencefestival/

Texas Independence Fest is an American underground music festival focused on extreme metal, held at Grizzly Hall in Austin, Texas. It started in 2008.

Behemoth and Goatwhore headlined the event in 2014. The 2016 lineup included Bury Your Dead, Unearth, Carnifex, Malevolent Creation, Ringworm and Nekrogoblikon.

Anthrax and Killswitch Engage headlined in 2017. The 2018 lineup consisted of Dying Fetus, Thy Art is Murder, Carnifex, Oceano, Fit for an Autopsy, Sworn In, Evergreen Terrace, The Browning, Rivers of Nihil, Enterprise Earth and Darkness Divided.

== See also ==
- Hell's Heroes (music festival)
- Big Texas Metal Fest
- Wrecking Ball Madness
