= Dreary North Fest =

Dreary North Fest is an extreme metal-focused music festival held at Subterranean in Chicago during September. It was founded by independent record label executive Brett Ray, who owns a label called Suspended Soul Tapes and Records. The event was first held in 2021. The 2022 lineup consisted of acts such as Cloud Rat, World Peace, Sick/Tired, Choke, Fluoride, Knoll, Test, Sissy Spacek, Grishka and Test.

== See also ==
- Metal Threat
- Forever Deaf Fest
