= Sonic German Beatdown – Live in Germany =

Sonic German Beatdown

Live album by Death Angel
- Released: 2009
- Recorded: May 26, 2007
- Venue: Rock Hard Festival, Gelsenkirchen, Germany
- Genre: Thrash metal
- Length: 78:32
- Label: Nuclear Blast
- Producer: Lindemann Film

Death Angel chronology
| Killing Season (2008) | Sonic German Beatdown (2009) | Relentless Retribution (2010) |

Sonic German Beatdown – Live in Germany is the second live album by the American thrash metal band Death Angel, released in 2009. The album was recorded from their performance at Rock Hard Festival in Gelsenkirchen, Germany, on May 26, 2007. A DVD recording of the concert was released simultaneously.

== Track listing ==
1. "Intro" – 0:46
2. "Seemingly Endless Time" (Cavestany) – 4:37
3. "Voracious Souls" (Cavestany, Osegueda) – 7:03
4. "Mistress of Pain" (Cavestany) – 4:48
5. "Ex-Tc" (Cavestany, Osegueda) – 3:04
6. "3rd Floor" (Cavestany, Osegueda) – 4:56
7. "Thrown to the Wolves" (Cavestany) – 6:36
8. "5 Steps of Freedom" (Cavestany, Galeon, Pepa) – 4:34
9. "Thicker Than Blood" (Cavestany, Osegueda) – 4:12
10. "The Devil Incarnate" (Cavestany, Pepa) – 8:50
11. "Disturbing the Peace" (Cavestany) – 4:32
12. "Stagnant" (Cavestany, Galeon) – 6:18
13. "The Ultra-Violence (Introducing: Carnival Justice)" (Cavestany, Pepa) – 4:34
14. "Bored" (Cavestany) – 3:50
15. "Kill as One" (Cavestany) – 9:52

== Credits ==
- Mark Osegueda – lead vocals
- Rob Cavestany – lead guitar, backing vocals
- Ted Aguilar – rhythm guitar, backing vocals
- Dennis Pepa – bass, backing vocals
- Andy Galeon – drums, backing vocals
