= Fall from Grace (Death Angel album) =

Live album by Death Angel
- Released: November 19, 1990
- Recorded: July 9, 1988
- Venue: Paradiso, Amsterdam, Netherland
- Genre: Thrash metal
- Length: 60:28
- Label: Enigma
- Producer: Edward Ka-Spel

Death Angel chronology
Act III (1990)	Fall from Grace (1990)	The Art of Dying (2004)

Professional ratings
Review scores
Source	Rating
AllMusic	1.5/5 stars
Collector's Guide to Heavy Metal	7/10

Fall from Grace is a live album by the American thrash metal band Death Angel, released in 1990. Due to label changes, the album was released without input from the band and new label Geffen Records, hence the lack of the band's trademark logo on the artwork.

Despite being referred to as an official release, the members of Death Angel have stated in interviews that they did not know of this album until they saw a copy of it in a record store in Arizona, just prior to the band's near-fatal bus accident.

== Track listing ==
1. "Evil Priest" (Cavestany, Osegueda) – 5:46
2. "Why You Do This" (Cavestany, Osegueda) – 6:05
3. "Mistress of Pain" (Cavestany) – 4:26
4. "Road Mutants" (Cavestany, Pepa) – 4:01
5. "Voracious Souls" (Cavestany, Osegueda) – 6:28
6. "Confused" (Cavestany, Pepa) – 7:00
7. "Bored" (Cavestany) – 3:28
8. "Kill as One" (Cavestany) – 6:28
9. "Guilty of Innocence" (Cavestany) – 4:36
10. "Shores of Sin" (Cavestany, Pepa, Vain) – 5:12
11. "Final Death" (Cavestany) – 7:00

== Personnel ==
Death Angel

- Mark Osegueda – lead vocals
- Rob Cavestany – lead guitar, backing vocals
- Gus Pepa – rhythm guitar, backing vocals
- Dennis Pepa – bass, backing vocals
- Andy Galeon – drums, backing vocals

Production

- Edward Ka-Spel – production
