= The Bay Strikes Back =

2020–23 concert tour by Testament, Exodus, and Death Angel

- World tour by Testament, Exodus and Death Angel
- Start date: February 6, 2020
- End date: October 1, 2023
- Legs: 5
- No. of shows: 123

The Bay Strikes Back was a concert tour featuring Bay Area thrash metal bands Testament, Exodus and Death Angel. The first leg of the tour took place in Europe from February 6, 2020, to March 11, 2020. Death Angel was promoting their ninth album Humanicide, while the tour predated the release of Testament's thirteenth studio album Titans of Creation by around two months. Other than two shows in Northern California in October and November 2021, the European leg of The Bay Strikes Back tour was the last tour that drummer Gene Hoglan did with Testament before he left the band in January 2022.

A North American leg of The Bay Strikes Back tour took place in April and May 2022. This was Testament's first major US tour since the release of Titans of Creation in April 2020, and it also saw Exodus touring to support their eleventh studio album Persona Non Grata, while Death Angel continued touring behind Humanicide. The North American leg of The Bay Strikes Back tour was also Testament's first major tour with onetime drummer Dave Lombardo, who replaced Hoglan in March 2022. Another European leg took place in the summer of 2022, followed by a second North American leg in the fall.

== Tour dates ==
Date	City	Country	Venue
Europe
February 6, 2020	Copenhagen	Denmark	Amager Bio
February 7, 2020	Stockholm	Sweden	Arenan Fryshuset
February 8, 2020	Oslo	Norway	Rockefeller
February 10, 2020	Helsinki	Finland	The Circus
February 11, 2020	Tampere	Finland	Pakkahuone
February 13, 2020	Hamburg	Germany	Docks
February 14, 2020	Oberhausen	Germany	Turbinenhalle
February 15, 2020	Wiesbaden	Germany	Schlachthof
February 16, 2020	Utrecht	Netherlands	TivoliVredenburg
February 18, 2020	Berlin	Germany	Huxleys
February 19, 2020	Wrocław	Poland	Orbita Hall
February 20, 2020	Vienna	Austria	Arena
February 21, 2020	Munich	Germany	Backstage
February 22, 2020	Filderstadt	Germany	Filharmonie
February 24, 2020	Zurich	Switzerland	Volkshaus
February 27, 2020	Barcelona	Spain	Razzmatazz
February 28, 2020	Madrid	Spain	Palacio Vistalegre
February 29, 2020	Toulouse	France	Bikini
March 1, 2020	Paris	France	Élysée Montmartre
March 3, 2020	Bristol	United Kingdom	O2 Academy
March 4, 2020	Dublin	Ireland	National Stadium
March 6, 2020	London	United Kingdom	O2 Forum
March 7, 2020	Manchester	United Kingdom	Academy 1
March 8, 2020	Glasgow	United Kingdom	Barrowland
March 10, 2020	Brussels	Belgium	AB
North America
October 7, 2021	Sacramento	United States	Aftershock Festival
November 27, 2021	Oakland	United States	Fox Oakland Theatre
April 9, 2022	San Luis Obispo	United States	Fremont Theater
April 10, 2022	Anaheim	United States	House of Blues
April 12, 2022	San Diego	United States	House of Blues
April 13, 2022	Las Vegas	United States	House of Blues
April 15, 2022	Tucson	United States	Rialto Theatre
April 16, 2022	Albuquerque	United States	Sunshine Theater
April 19, 2022	Oklahoma City	United States	Diamond Ballroom
April 20, 2022	Houston	United States	White Oak Music Hall
April 21, 2022	Austin	United States	Emo's
April 22, 2022	Dallas	United States	Gas Monkey Bar N' Grill
April 23, 2022	New Orleans	United States	House of Blues
April 25, 2022	Orlando	United States	Hard Rock Live
April 26, 2022	Atlanta	United States	The Masquerade
April 27, 2022	Raleigh	United States	The Ritz
April 28, 2022	Chattanooga	United States	The Signal
April 30, 2022	Sayreville	United States	Starland Ballroom
May 1, 2022	Baltimore	United States	Baltimore Soundstage
May 2, 2022	Boston	United States	House of Blues
May 3, 2022	Philadelphia	United States	Theatre of Living Arts
May 5, 2022	Huntington	United States	The Paramount
May 6, 2022	Buffalo	United States	Town Ballroom
May 7, 2022	Cincinnati	United States	Madison Theater
May 9, 2022	Pittsburgh	United States	Stage AE
May 10, 2022	Cleveland	United States	Agora Theatre and Ballroom
May 11, 2022	Columbus	United States	Newport Music Hall
May 12, 2022	Detroit	United States	Majestic Theater
May 14, 2022	Joliet	United States	The Forge
May 15, 2022	Joliet	United States	The Forge
May 17, 2022	Minneapolis	United States	Skyway Theatre
May 19, 2022	Denver	United States	Summit Music Hall
May 20, 2022	Salt Lake City	United States	The Depot
May 22, 2022	Seattle	United States	The Showbox
May 23, 2022	Portland	United States	Roseland Theater
May 25, 2022	Sacramento	United States	Ace of Spades
Europe
July 9, 2022	Ballenstedt	Germany	Rock Harz Festival
July 10, 2022	Vizovice	Czech Republic	Masters of Rock
July 11, 2022	Kraków	Poland	Studio
July 12, 2022	Bratislava	Slovakia	Refinery Gallery
July 14, 2022	Neukirchen-Vluyn	Germany	Dong Open Air
July 16, 2022	Leoben	Austria	Area 53 Festival
July 17, 2022	Cremona	Italy	Luppolo in Rock
July 19, 2022	Rome	Italy	Rock in Roma
July 21, 2022	Fritzlar	Germany	Rock am Stück
July 23, 2022	Plovdiv	Bulgaria	Hills of Rock
July 24, 2022	Sibiu	Romania	Artmania Festival
July 26, 2022	Tolmin	Slovenia	Metaldays
July 29, 2022	Vagos	Portugal	Vagos Metalfest
July 30, 2022	Burgos	Spain	Anden 56
July 31, 2022	Pamplona	Spain	Totem
August 3, 2022	Málaga	Spain	Paris 15
August 4, 2022	Villena	Spain	Leyendas del Rock
August 5, 2022	Madrid	Spain	La Riviera
August 6, 2022	Barcelona	Spain	Razzmatazz
August 7, 2022	Saint-Maurice-de-Gourdans	France	Sylak Open Air
August 9, 2022	Cenon	France	Rocher de Palmer
August 12, 2022	Walton-on-Trent	United Kingdom	Bloodstock Festival
August 13, 2022	Kortrijk	Belgium	Alcatraz Festival
August 14, 2022	Saarbrücken	Germany	Garage
August 16, 2022	Innsbruck	Austria	Music Hall
August 17, 2022	Dinkelsbühl	Germany	Summer Breeze
August 19, 2022	Sulingen	Germany	Reload Festival
August 20, 2022	Eindhoven	Netherlands	Dynamo Metalfest
August 21, 2022	Saint-Nolff	France	Motocultor Festival
North America
September 9, 2022	Phoenix	United States	Van Buren
September 10, 2022	Albuquerque	United States	Sunshine Theater
September 12, 2022	Wichita	United States	Cotillion Ballroom
September 13, 2022	Kansas City	United States	Truman
September 15, 2022	St. Louis	United States	The Pageant
September 16, 2022	Nashville	United States	Brooklyn Bowl
September 18, 2022	St. Petersburg	United States	Jannus Live
September 19, 2022	Fort Lauderdale	United States	Revolution
September 21, 2022	Asheville	United States	The Orange Peel
September 22, 2022	Silver Spring	United States	The Fillmore
September 23, 2022	Stroudsburg	United States	Sherman Theater
September 24, 2022	New York City	United States	Palladium Times Square
September 26, 2022	Hartford	United States	Webster Theater
September 27, 2022	Albany	United States	Empire Live
September 28, 2022	Portland	United States	State Theater
September 30, 2022	Montreal	Canada	MTelus
October 1, 2022	London	Canada	London Music Hall
October 3, 2022	Fort Wayne	United States	Piere's
October 4, 2022	Milwaukee	United States	The Rave
October 6, 2022	Winnipeg	Canada	Burton Cummings Theatre
October 8, 2022	Calgary	Canada	Palace Theatre
October 10, 2022	Vancouver	Canada	Commodore Ballroom
October 12, 2022	Ventura	United States	Majestic Ventura Theater
October 13, 2022	Los Angeles	United States	The Wiltern
October 14, 2022	Reno	United States	Cargo
October 15, 2022	San Jose	United States	San Jose Civic
Asia
September 21, 2023	Quezon City	Philippines	SM North EDSA Skydome
September 23, 2023	Tokyo	Japan	Zepp DiverCity
September 24, 2023	Tokyo	Japan	Zepp DiverCity
September 26, 2023	Bangkok	Thailand	The Street Hall - Ratchada
September 28, 2023	Singapore	Singapore	Esplanade – Theatres on the Bay
September 30, 2023	Kuala Lumpur	Malaysia	Zepp Kuala Lumpur
October 1, 2023	Jakarta	Indonesia	Hammersonic Festival

== Cancelled shows ==
List of cancelled concerts, showing date, city, country, venue and reason for cancellation
Date	City	Country	Venue	Reason
February 25, 2020	Milan	Italy	Live club	Concerns over COVID-19 pandemic
March 11, 2020	Hanover	Germany	Capitol	Concerns over COVID-19 pandemic
