= Toledo Death Fest =

- Genre: Extreme metal
- Frequency: Annually
- Location: Toledo, Ohio
- Years active: 2009-present
- Founder: Keith Wampler
- Website: www.facebook.com/ToledoDeathfest/

Toledo Death Fest is an annual music festival held in Toledo, Ohio. The 2023 lineup consisted of acts such as Oceano, the Convalescence and Incite. Previous incarnations of the event featured bands such as Jungle Rot, Malevolent Creation, and Casket Robbery. The festival was founded in 2009 by Keith Wampler, frontman of the Convalescence.

== See also ==
- A389 Bash
- Metal Threat
- Hell's Heroes
- Milwaukee Metal Fest
- Flatline Fest
- Michigan Metal Fest
- Mad With Power
- Shamrock Slaughter
