= Diocletian (band) =

New Zealander band

- Origin: Auckland, New Zealand
- Genre: War metal
- Years active: 2004–2015,2016–present
- Label: Osmose Productions
- Members: B.S.; C.T.; E.M.; R.W.
- Past members: L. Muir; C. Sinclair; J. Baldwin; K. Stanley; A. Craft; V. Kusabs; S. Bidwell
- Website: Official website

Diocletian is a New Zealand war metal band from Auckland. Formed in 2004, the band split in 2015. Its lineup then featured Brendan Southwell (also known as Atrociter and B.S.) (guitar, vocals), L. Muir (guitar, vocals, bass), C. Sinclair (drums) and J. Baldwin (guitars). The band's 2015 album, Gesundrian, was featured as number 15 on Pitchfork's list of "The Best Metal Albums of 2014".

Brendan Southwell reactivated the band in 2016 with a whole new line-up. In 2018, Diocletian members are B.S. at lead guitar, E. M. at drums, and R.W. (Rigel Walshe from Dawn of Azazel) at bass. Impurath, from the American act Black Witchery takes lead vocal duty when available as C.T.

The band played at Prague Death Mass in 2023.

== Band members ==
Current members

- B.S. – guitar, vocals (2004–2015, 2016–present)
- R.W. - bass (2017–present)
- E.M. - drums (2017–present)
- C.T. - vocals (2016–present)

Former members

- L. Muir – guitar (2004–2008), vocals (2004–2008, 2011–2015), bass (2011–2015)
- C. Sinclair – drums (2006–2015)
- J. Baldwin – guitars (2011–2014, 2015)
- K. Stanley – vocals, bass
- A. Craft – drums (2004–2005)
- V. Kusabs – guitar, bass, vocals (2006–2010)
- S. Bidwell – guitar (2015)

== Discography ==
Studio albums

- Doom Cult (2009)
- Bellum Omnium Contra Omnes (subsequently reissued as War of All Against All) (2010)
- Gesundrian (2014)
- Amongst the Flames of a Burning God (2019)
- Inexorable Nexus (2024)

EPs and splits

- Decimator (2007)
- Chaos Rising (2008)
- Sect of Swords (2008)
- European Annihilation (2012)
- Disciples of War (2012, with Weregoat)
- Darkness Swallows All (2021)

Compilations

- Annihilation Rituals (2012)

Demos

- Demo 1: 2005 (2005)
