= Upheaval Festival =

Music festival in Grand Rapids, Michigan

Upheaval Festival is an American music festival held outdoors at Belknap Park in Grand Rapids, Michigan, during July. The first edition of the festival was originally planned to take place in 2020 but was rescheduled to 2021 due to the COVID-19 pandemic.

The festival was headlined by Falling in Reverse and Rob Zombie in 2025. The 2026 line-up included acts such as Poppy, Story of the Year, Set It Off, and Papa Roach.

The 2026 edition suffered from hazardous air quality due to wildfire smoke; the event still took place, although warnings were given to attendees by festival organizers. Poppy skipped the festival for this reason; her band played an instrumental set while wearing respirator masks.

== See also ==
- Inkcarceration Music & Tattoo Festival
- Michigan Metal Fest
