= Forever Deaf Fest =

Forever Deaf Fest is an American music festival held in Chicago during the wintertime, usually focusing on artists in the hardcore punk and extreme metal varieties. It was founded in 2018. The event is held at Sleeping Village. Integrity headlined the festival's sixth iteration in 2025. Weekend Nachos and Pig Destroyer are scheduled to play in 2026, and Young Widows is scheduled to headline.

== See also ==
- Dreary North Fest
