= The Organization (band) =

American heavy metal band

- Origin: San Francisco, California, United States
- Genres: Funk metal, heavy metal
- Years active: 1991–1995
- Labels: Unsafe Unsane Recordings, Metal Blade
- Spinoff of: Death Angel
- Past members: Rob Cavestany; Andy Galeon; Dennis Pepa; Gus Pepa

The Organization was an American heavy metal band, formed in 1991 after the breakup of thrash metal band Death Angel. They made an appearance at the Dynamo Open Air festival in 1992. The band incorporated elements of metal, funk, and alt rock, and they released two albums in the early 1990s on their own label, Unsafe Unsane Recordings, which was distributed through Metal Blade Records. The band included the original line-up of musicians from Death Angel minus singer Mark Osegueda, who left the music business to go to college. The Organization disbanded after bassist Dennis Pepa left the band in 1995.

== Discography ==
=== Demos ===
- Home Job (1992)

=== Albums ===
- The Organization [Unsafe Unsane Recordings - license / Metal Blade Records - distribution] (1993)
- Savor the Flavor [Unsafe Unsane Recordings - license / Metal Blade Records - distribution] (1995)
