= Inkcarceration Music & Tattoo Festival =

Music festival in Mansfield, Ohio, United States

Inkcarceration Music & Tattoo Festival is an American music festival focused on heavy metal music. It is held at the Ohio State Reformatory in Mansfield, Ohio. The bands Bad Omens, Limp Bizkit and Disturbed are scheduled to headline in 2026. Gojira, Papa Roach and Cypress Hill are also scheduled to play.

== See also ==
- Upheaval Festival
