= Wrecking Ball Madness =

- Genre: Extreme metal
- Date: October
- Venue: The Echo
- Location: Dallas, Texas
- Website: Wrecking Ball Madness on Instagram

Wrecking Ball Madness is an American underground music festival focused on extreme metal, held at The Echo in Dallas. American death metal band Frozen Soul headlined the event in 2022, with Municipal Waste and 200 Stab Wounds also playing. In 2023, the event featured acts such as Dying Fetus, a returning Frozen Soul, Devourment, Despised Icon and the Acacia Strain. The festival was not held in 2024. Frozen Soul, Devourment and 200 Stab Wounds returned to the festival when it was held again in 2025. Suffocation was also there.

== See also ==
- Texas Big Metal Fest
- Texas Independence Fest
- Hell's Heroes
