= The Sylvee =

Music venue in Madison, Wisconsin, United States

Coordinates: 43.08072°N 89.37445°W

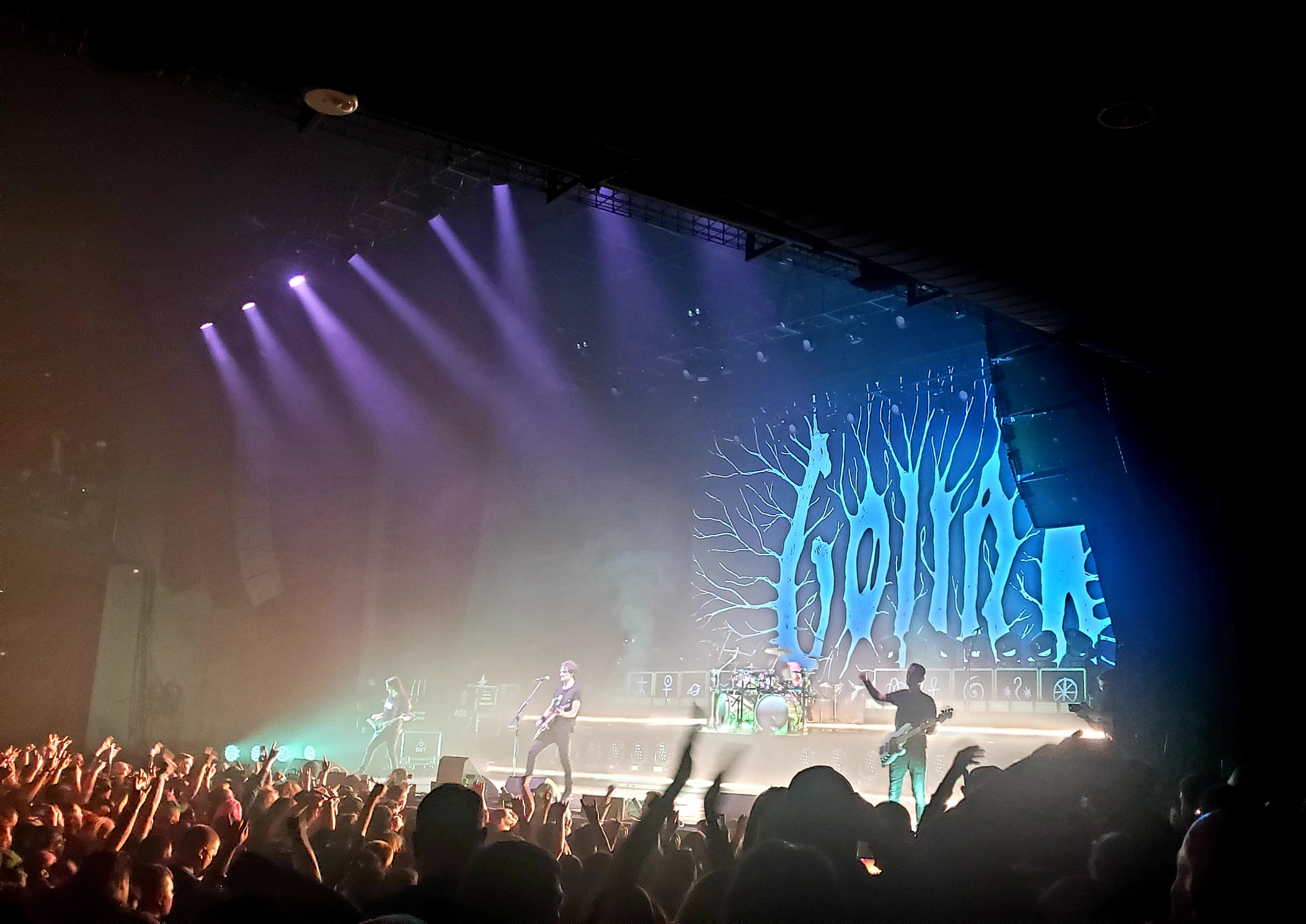
- Gojira at The Sylvee in 2021
- Interactive map of The Sylvee
- Address: 25 South Livingston Street; Madison, WI 53703
- Owner: Frank Productions
- Capacity: 2,500
- Public transit: Metro Transit

Construction
- Opened: September 27, 2018

Website
- Venue website

The Sylvee is an indoor concert venue in the Capitol East neighborhood of Madison, Wisconsin. Opened in 2018, it is owned and operated by Frank Productions (now a subsidiary of Live Nation Entertainment), and named after the company's co-founder, Sylvia Frank, who died in 2006. The venue shares its ownership with the nearby High Noon Saloon, and is close to Breese Stevens Field, where outdoor concerts are also managed by Frank Productions.

The first performance at the Sylvee was a concert by Nathaniel Rateliff & the Night Sweats on September 27, 2018. It is the site of the annual Mad With Power heavy metal music festival.

According to Pollstar magazine, the Sylvee consistently ranks as one of the world's highest-grossing music club venues. In 2021, with the venue and the industry as a whole still recovering from the COVID-19 pandemic, it ranked sixth in the world, with 45,613 tickets sold and total gross receipts of $1,866,229. In 2023, with the direct impact of the pandemic mostly ended, the venue sold 128,321 tickets and took in a gross of $6,001,914, although its ranking fell to number 13 because other venues had surpassed it.
