= Big Texas Metal Fest =

- Genre: Heavy metal, extreme metal
- Date: May
- Venue: Far Out Lounge
- Locations: Austin, Texas, United States
- Website: www.bigtexasmetalfest.com

Big Texas Metal Fest is a three-day music festival focused on extreme metal held at the Far Out Lounge in Austin, Texas. American deathcore band All Shall Perish played their first show in 11 years at the 2024 iteration of the festival. Hatebreed, Atreyu, Memphis May Fire, Unearth, Gideon also played that year. Additionally, American death metal band Wretched played, and American deathcore band The Red Chord was also there.

== See also ==
- Hell's Heroes (music festival)
- Flatline Fest
- Texas Independence Fest
- Wrecking Ball Madness
