= The Evil Divide =

Studio album by Death Angel
- Released: May 27, 2016
- Recorded: 2015–2016
- Studio: AudioHammer Studios in Sanford, Florida
- Genre: Thrash metal
- Length: 45:13
- Label: Nuclear Blast
- Producer: Jason Suecof

Death Angel chronology
The Dream Calls for Blood (2013)	The Evil Divide (2016)	Humanicide (2019)

The Evil Divide is the eighth studio album by the American thrash metal band Death Angel, released on May 27, 2016. This album marked the first time since Act III (1990) that Death Angel had not made any personnel changes in three consecutive studio albums, and their third collaboration with longtime producer Jason Suecof.

== Reception ==
Professional ratings
Review scores
Source	Rating
Metal Injection	7.5/10 stars

The Evil Divide has received positive reviews. Kevin Stewart-Panko of Metal Injection gave the album a rating of seven-and-a-half stars out of ten and calls it "a seriously angry sounding metal album. It gravitates from fast, blood-boiling thrash to mid-paced thrash, a swing that may not seem so wild on paper, but within the context of the ten songs here, presents noticeable worlds of divergence between song sequences and movements."

== Track listing ==
All lyrics are written by Mark Osegueda, except where noted; all music is composed by Rob Cavestany.

No.	Title	Lyrics	Length
1.	"The Moth"	Rob Cavestany	4:38
2.	"Cause for Alarm"		3:22
3.	"Lost"		4:57
4.	"Father of Lies"		5:05
5.	"Hell to Pay"		3:12
6.	"It Can't Be This"		4:16
7.	"Hatred United / United Hate" (featuring Andreas Kisser)		5:17
8.	"Breakaway"		4:01
9.	"The Electric Cell"		4:38
10.	"Let the Pieces Fall"		5:47
Total length:			45:13

Limited digipak edition bonus track
No.	Title	Lyrics	Music	Length
11.	"Wasteland" (The Mission cover)	Wayne Hussey	The Mission	5:18
Total length:				50:31

== Personnel ==
=== Death Angel ===
- Mark Osegueda – lead vocals
- Rob Cavestany – lead guitar, backing vocals
- Ted Aguilar – rhythm guitar
- Damien Sisson – bass
- Will Carroll – drums

=== Production ===
- Jason Suecof – production
- Ted Jensen – mastering at Sterling Sound, New York City

== Charts ==
Chart (2016)	Peak position
Australian Albums (ARIA)	80
Austrian Albums (Ö3 Austria)	64
Belgian Albums (Ultratop Flanders)	192
French Albums (SNEP)	110
German Albums (Offizielle Top 100)	37
Hungarian Albums (MAHASZ)	37
Swiss Albums (Schweizer Hitparade)	40
US Billboard 200	98
