= Metal Threat =

Metal Threat is a music festival focused on heavy metal music based in Chicago and held at Reggies during the summer.

Notable acts that have played the festival include Master, Absu, Exhumer, Inquisition and Arghoslent. Other acts that have participated include Slagmaur, Ved Buens Ende, Aura Noir and Impaled Nazarene. German doom metal band The Ruins of Beverast were supposed to play this festival in 2016 but were forced to cancel due to their visas being denied. Norwegian black metal band Gehenna was scheduled to perform in 2023, but ultimately decided not to travel.

== See also ==
- Shamrock Slaughter
- A389 Bash
- Flatline Fest
- Hell's Heroes
- Michigan Metal Fest
- Toledo Death Fest
- Milwaukee Metal Fest
- Mad With Power
