= The Dream Calls for Blood =

Studio album by Death Angel
- Released: October 11, 2013
- Recorded: April–May 2013
- Studio: Audiohammer Studios in Sanford, Florida, Spiderville Studios, Oakland, California
- Genre: Thrash metal
- Length: 47:25
- Label: Nuclear Blast
- Producer: Jason Suecof, Rob Cavestany

Death Angel chronology
Relentless Retribution (2010)	The Dream Calls for Blood (2013)	The Evil Divide (2016)

The Dream Calls for Blood is the seventh studio album by American thrash metal band Death Angel. It was released on October 11, 2013, via Nuclear Blast. The album sold 5,400 copies in the U.S in its first week of release and reached number 72 on the Billboard 200, marking the first time in Death Angel's history that they cracked the Top 100 on the American charts.

== Background ==
Guitarist Rob Cavestany described the album's title as "basically our motto" and further explained that:

In our point of view the dream being our band and keeping the band going and making music for your life. The blood is all the sacrifice and all hard work that goes into it and that's the metaphor for that. It's not only meant for music. It's also meant for other people to relate in their own life and goals that they're trying to achieve and the sacrifices that it takes to achieve these goals. And along with that, there's also a tinge of aggression in there about other people that cut corners and don't quite go through all the steps it takes to achieve the goal the right way. So there's a little bit of a middle finger to those people that go about it that way and don't fully respect what it takes.

The album features a guest guitar solo by the album's producer, Jason Suecof.

== Reception ==
Professional ratings
Review scores
Source	Rating
About.com	4/5 stars
AllMusic	4.5/5 stars
Blabbermouth.net	9/10
Brave Words & Bloody Knuckles	8.5/10
Exclaim!	8/10
Metal Forces	8.5/10
Metal Hammer	4/5 stars
Metal Storm	8.5/10
Rock Hard	8.0/10

The Dream Calls for Blood has been well received by critics. Writing for About.com, Neil Pretorius praised the album as "another triumph for a band that clearly still has a lot of gas left in the tank" and for "throw[ing] down the gauntlet to the thrash scene at large". AllMusic's Fred Thomas also praised the band for remaining a "powerhouse of tight and shiny thrash metal" this late in its career, observing that Death Angel "still sound visceral and hungry decades into their work, a rare case of a band getting sharper as it goes instead of mellowing". While Greg Pratt suggested in Exclaim! that the album's length was too long, he applauded the album's "super-tight rhythm section, killer guitar work and excellent vocals". Metal Forces' Neil Arnold noted that the album is a more "straight-laced" thrash album in contrast with the band's more experimental fare, which he claimed stands as "simple proof that Death Angel rules the thrash scene".

== Track listing ==
All music by Rob Cavestany, all lyrics by Mark Osegueda, except "Territorial Instinct / Bloodlust" music and lyrics by Rob Cavestany.

No.	Title	Length
1.	"Left for Dead"	5:31
2.	"Son of the Morning"	4:02
3.	"Fallen"	4:41
4.	"The Dream Calls for Blood"	4:11
5.	"Succubus"	4:27
6.	"Execution / Don't Save Me"	4:39
7.	"Caster of Shame"	3:37
8.	"Detonate"	4:42
9.	"Empty"	4:58
10.	"Territorial Instinct / Bloodlust"	6:37
Total length:		47:25

Digipak edition bonus track
No.	Title	Length
11.	"Heaven and Hell" (Black Sabbath cover)	6:47
Total length:		54:12

== Personnel ==
Death Angel

- Mark Osegueda – lead vocals
- Rob Cavestany – lead guitar, backing vocals
- Ted Aguilar – rhythm guitar, backing vocals, first and third guitar solo on track 6
- Damien Sisson – bass
- Will Carroll – drums

Guest musician

- Jason Suecof – guitar solo on "Empty"

Production

- Rob Cavestany – production, additional engineering, mixing
- Jason Suecof – production, engineering, mixing
- Ronn Miller – assistant engineering
- Eyal Levi – additional engineering
- Ted Jensen – mastering at Sterling Sound, New York
- Brent Elliot White – cover art
- Rob Kimura – CD layout design
- Nick Koljian – band photography

== Charts ==
Chart (2013)	Peak position
Billboard 200	72

== Release history ==
Region	Date	Label	Format
Europe	October 11, 2013	Nuclear Blast	CD, digital
United Kingdom	October 14, 2013	Nuclear Blast	CD, digital
North America	October 15, 2013	Nuclear Blast	CD, digital
