= Humanicide =

Studio album by Death Angel
- Released: May 31, 2019
- Genre: Thrash metal
- Length: 45:01
- Label: Nuclear Blast
- Producer: Jason Suecof

Death Angel chronology
The Evil Divide (2016)	Humanicide (2019)

Singles from Humanicide
- 1. "Humanicide" Released: March 22, 2019; 2. "The Pack" Released: April 26, 2019

Humanicide is the ninth studio album by the American thrash metal band Death Angel, released on May 31, 2019. Like their previous three studio albums, Humanicide was produced by Jason Suecof, while its release marks the first time the band had recorded more than three albums with the same lineup.

In November 2019, the title track was nominated for the Grammy Award for "Best Metal Performance", making it Death Angel's first ever Grammy nomination.

In October 2020, Death Angel released an acoustic version of "Revelation Song" on their EP Under Pressure.

== Track listing ==
All lyrics are written by Mark Osegueda, except where noted; all music is composed by Rob Cavestany, except where noted.

No.	Title	Lyrics	Music	Length
1.	"Humanicide"			5:42
2.	"Divine Defector"			3:24
3.	"Aggressor"	Rob Cavestany		5:11
4.	"I Came for Blood"			3:12
5.	"Immortal Behated"			6:08
6.	"Alive and Screaming"		Ted Aguilar	3:36
7.	"The Pack"	Rob Cavestany		3:33
8.	"Ghost of Me"			4:34
9.	"Revelation Song"			5:33
10.	"Of Rats and Men"			4:08
Total length:				45:01

Bonus track
No.	Title	Length
11.	"The Day I Walked Away"	3:29
Total length:		48:30

== Personnel ==
=== Death Angel ===
- Mark Osegueda – lead vocals
- Rob Cavestany – lead guitar, backing vocals
- Ted Aguilar – rhythm guitar, third guitar solo on track "Alive and Screaming"
- Damien Sisson – bass
- Will Carroll – drums

=== Production ===
- Jason Suecof – production
- Ted Jensen – mastering at Sterling Sound Nashville
- Alexi Laiho – guest guitar solo on track "Ghost of Me"

== Charts ==
Chart (2019)	Peak position
Austrian Albums (Ö3 Austria)	46
Belgian Albums (Ultratop Flanders)	92
Belgian Albums (Ultratop Wallonia)	94
French Albums (SNEP)	132
German Albums (Offizielle Top 100)	19
Japanese Albums (Oricon)	141
Scottish Albums (Official Charts)	67
Spanish Albums (PROMUSICAE)	87
Swiss Albums (Schweizer Hitparade)	21
