= Flatline Fest =

American music festival

Flatline Fest is a two-day American music festival focused on extreme metal held at the Oriental Theater in Denver, Colorado. The first iteration of the festival debuted on June 13 and 14, 2026. The event is organized by music producer Dave Otero and his spouse, Chelsea Lowe.

Acts from the 2026 festival included Cattle Decapitation, Aborted, Archspire, the Zenith Passage, Cephalic Carnage and Allegaeon. A masked band called Nuclear Power Trio, which is rumored to contain members of Cephalic Carnage, Allegaeon, and Havok, also performed at the event.

== See also ==
- Milwaukee Metal Fest
- Shamrock Slaughter
- A389 Bash
- Metal Threat
- Hell's Heroes
- Big Texas Metal Fest
- Toledo Death Fest
- Mad With Power
