= Shamrock Slaughter =

Shamrock Slaughter is an American two-day music festival focused on death metal and subgenres such as brutal death metal and slam. The festival was held for the first time over Saint Patrick's Day weekend at Piere's Entertainment Center and Stan's Room in Fort Wayne, Indiana in the spring of 2026. Incantation and Sanguisugabogg headlined the event. Other acts included Flesher, Regurgitation and Pyrexia.

== See also ==
- Metal Threat
- Hell's Heroes
- Milwaukee Metal Fest
- Flatline Fest
- Michigan Metal Fest
- Toledo Death Fest
- Mad With Power
- Upheaval Festival
