= Relentless Retribution =

Studio album by Death Angel
- Released: September 3, 2010
- Studio: Audio Hammer Studios, Sanford, FL, Big Shot Studios, Altamont Springs, FL
- Genre: Thrash metal
- Length: 56:40
- Label: Nuclear Blast
- Producer: Jason Suecof, Rob Cavestany

Death Angel chronology
Sonic German Beatdown – Live in Germany (2009)	Relentless Retribution (2010)	The Dream Calls for Blood (2013)

Professional ratings
Review scores
Source	Rating
About.com	3.5/5 stars
AllMusic	3.5/5 stars
Metal Hammer (GER)	6.0/7
PopMatters	5/10
Rock Hard	9.0/10

Relentless Retribution is the sixth studio album by American thrash metal band Death Angel. The album was released September 3, 2010, in Europe (but not including the United Kingdom), on September 6 in the United Kingdom, and on September 14 in the United States. Its second track "Claws in So Deep" features an acoustic part performed by Rodrigo y Gabriela. This is Death Angel's first album with bassist Damien Sisson and drummer Will Carroll (replacing original members Dennis Pepa and Andy Galeon respectively), and their first collaboration with Jason Suecof, who has since produced the band's subsequent albums. The album sold 2,700 copies in its first week in the U.S.

== Track listing ==
All music is composed by Rob Cavestany.

No.	Title	Lyrics	Length
1.	"Relentless Revolution"	Mark Osegueda	4:28
2.	"Claws in So Deep"	Cavestany	7:44
3.	"Truce"	Osegueda	3:31
4.	"Into the Arms of Righteous Anger"	Osegueda	4:31
5.	"River of Rapture"	Osegueda	4:35
6.	"Absence of Light"	Osegueda	4:32
7.	"This Hate"	Osegueda	3:33
8.	"Death of the Meek"	Osegueda	5:15
9.	"Opponents at Sides"	Cavestany	6:21
10.	"I Chose the Sky"	Osegueda	4:06
11.	"Volcanic"	Cavestany	3:34
12.	"Where They Lay"	Osegueda	4:30
Total length:			56:40

== Personnel ==
Death Angel

- Mark Osegueda − lead vocals
- Rob Cavestany − lead guitar, backing vocals, lead vocals on "Volcanic", co-lead vocals on "Claws in So Deep"
- Ted Aguilar − rhythm guitar, harmony guitar on "Claws in So Deep"
- Damien Sisson − bass
- Will Carroll − drums

Additional musicians

- Jason Suecof − guitar solos on "Truce"
- Rodrigo y Gabriela − acoustic guitar outro on "Claws in So Deep"

Production

- Jason Suecof − production, engineering, mixing
- Rob Cavestany − co-production
- Mark Lewis − engineering
- Ronn Miller, Rubin Salas − assistant engineering
- Ted Jensen − mastering at Sterling Sound, New York

== Charts ==
Chart (2010)	Peak position
Belgian Albums (Ultratop Flanders)	86
French Albums (SNEP)	95
German Albums (Offizielle Top 100)	45
Hungarian Albums (MAHASZ)	9
Swiss Albums (Schweizer Hitparade)	70
US Independent Albums (Billboard)	48
US Top Hard Rock Albums (Billboard)	25
US Heatseekers Albums (Billboard)	10
