= The Ultra-Violence =

Studio album by Death Angel
- Released: 23 April 1987
- Recorded: June 15–17, 1986
- Studio: Banquet Sound Studios, Santa Rosa, California
- Genre: Thrash metal
- Length: 45:20
- Label: Restless/Enigma
- Producer: Death Angel and Davy Vain

Death Angel chronology
Kill as One (1986)	The Ultra-Violence (1987)	Frolic Through the Park (1988)

The Ultra-Violence is the debut studio album by American thrash metal band Death Angel, released in 1987. The album was recorded while all members were under 20, with drummer Andy Galeon just 14 years old. It was mixed at George Tobin Studios in Hollywood, California.

== Reception and legacy ==
Professional ratings
Review scores
Source	Rating
AllMusic	3/5 stars
Collector's Guide to Heavy Metal	7/10
Kerrang!	4.5/5 stars

The Ultra-Violence is considered a classic in the thrash metal genre, listed as number 370 in the 2010 reference book, The Top 500 Heavy Metal Albums of All Time.

Adam McCann of Metal Digest wrote, "Punching their way out of the trenches of the Bay Area and following in the footsteps of the likes of Testament and Exodus, Death Angel delivered a beast of an album with many Death Angel fans still saying that The Ultra-Violence is their favourite album. The then snot-nosed kids showed how amazingly talented they were as they suddenly found themselves going toe to toe with their older peers and being able to come out on top with excellent songs and electrifying live performances."

== Track listing ==
No.	Title	Writer(s)	Length
1.	"Thrashers"	Rob Cavestany, Dennis Pepa	7:12
2.	"Evil Priest"	Cavestany, Mark Osegueda	4:54
3.	"Voracious Souls"	Cavestany, Osegueda	5:39
4.	"Kill as One"	Cavestany	5:00
5.	"The Ultra-Violence" (instrumental)	Cavestany, Pepa	10:33
6.	"Mistress of Pain"	Cavestany	4:04
7.	"Final Death"	Cavestany	6:04
8.	"I.P.F.S."	Cavestany	1:56
Total length:			45:20

2005 reissue bonus tracks
No.	Title	Writer(s)	Length
9.	"Thrashers" (Demo version)	Cavestany, Pepa	6:44
10.	"Kill as One" (Demo version)	Cavestany, Galeon, Osegueda	3:10
11.	"The Ultra-Violence" (Demo version)	Cavestany, Galeon, Pepa	3:15

- Mark Osegueda claimed in a 2003 interview that "I.P.F.S." stood for "Intense Puke Feeling Syndrome", but it is unclear if this was meant to be taken seriously.

== Personnel ==
Death Angel

- Mark Osegueda – lead vocals
- Rob Cavestany – lead guitar
- Gus Pepa – rhythm guitar, second guitar solo on "The Ultra-Violence"
- Dennis Pepa – bass, co-lead vocals on "Thrashers"
- Andy Galeon – drums

Additional musicians

- Arnie Tan – percussion

Production

- Death Angel – production
- Davy Vain – production
- Warren Dennis, Dennis Hulett – engineering
- Ron Goudie – mixing at George Tobin Studios, Hollywood, California
- Rob Cavestany – mixing
- Andy Galeon – mixing
- Robert Feist – mixing engineering
- John Kerns, Brian Rutter, John Kliner – assistant mixing
