= Act III (Death Angel album) =

Studio album by Death Angel
- Released: April 10, 1990
- Recorded: September–October 1989
- Studios: Dodge City Sound, Burbank, California
- Genres: Thrash metal; alternative metal
- Length: 44:54
- Label: Geffen
- Producers: Max Norman, Tom Zutaut

Death Angel chronology
Frolic Through the Park (1988)	Act III (1990)	Fall from Grace (1990)

Singles from Act III
- 1. "Seemingly Endless Time" Released: 1990; 2. "A Room with a View" Released: 1990

Act III is the third studio album by the thrash metal band Death Angel, released in 1990 on Geffen Records. This is the band's final studio album to feature guitarist Gus Pepa, and their only recording on Geffen. It was also their last studio album before their ten-year hiatus from 1991 to 2001.

== Overview ==
Act III was co-produced Max Norman (known for his work with Ozzy Osbourne, Megadeth, Savatage, Fates Warning and Loudness) and Tom Zutaut. This album once again presented a change in style for Death Angel, and is considerably much darker than its predecessors. While retaining some of the thrash metal elements of the band's previous two albums, it also features more of an alternative metal sound, drawing influences from a variety of musical styles such as funk, folk, progressive rock, heavy metal, hard rock and punk rock.

== Reception ==
Professional ratings
Review scores
Source	Rating
AllMusic	4.5/5 stars
Collector's Guide to Heavy Metal	9/10

Act III was successful in Europe, entering the album charts in France, Belgium, Switzerland, Hungary and the Netherlands. Although the album failed to break the band in their native America, the music videos for its singles, "Seemingly Endless Time" and "A Room with a View", received regular rotation on MTV's Headbangers Ball. In October 2020, Death Angel released an almost entirely acoustic version of "A Room With a View" on their Under Pressure EP.

Adam McCann of Metal Digest called Act III "an early 90's classic thrash album", and wrote, "There was something always a little bit more technical and progressive about Death Angel, but with Act III, the band found the perfect combination of thrash, technical and accessibility as they created a beast which saw the band achieve MTV heavy rotation with 'A Room With a View' and 'Seemingly Endless Time'. Check any list of the best heavy metal albums of all time and nine times out of ten, you'll find Act III."

Act III was listed as number 328 in the 2010 reference book, The Top 500 Heavy Metal Albums of All Time.

== Track listing ==
No.	Title	Lyrics	Music	Length
1.	"Seemingly Endless Time"	Rob Cavestany	Cavestany	3:49
2.	"Stop"	Cavestany, Mark Osegueda	Cavestany	5:10
3.	"Veil of Deception"	Cavestany	Cavestany	2:35
4.	"The Organization"	Andy Galeon	Galeon, Cavestany	4:16
5.	"Discontinued"	Galeon	Cavestany, Galeon, Gus Pepa, Dennis Pepa	5:50
6.	"A Room with a View"	Cavestany	Cavestany	4:42
7.	"Stagnant"	Cavestany	Galeon, Cavestany	5:33
8.	"EX-TC"	Osegueda	Cavestany	3:06
9.	"Disturbing the Peace"	Cavestany	Cavestany	3:53
10.	"Falling Asleep"	Cavestany	Cavestany	5:54
Total length:				44:54

== Personnel ==
Death Angel

- Mark Osegueda – lead vocals
- Rob Cavestany – lead guitar, backing vocals
- Gus Pepa – rhythm guitar, co-lead guitar on track 4 - 7 - 8
- Dennis Pepa – bass, backing vocals on track 6
- Andy Galeon – drums, backing vocals

Production

- Max Norman – production, engineering, mixing in November 1989 at Skip Saylor Recording, Los Angeles, California
- Stoli Jaeger – engineering
- Chris "Holmes" Puram – second engineering
- Rob Cavestany – mixing
- Andy Galeon – mixing
- George Marino – mastering at Sterling Sound, New York City
- Tom Zutaut – executive production
