= The Art of Dying (album) =

Studio album by Death Angel
- Released: May 4, 2004
- Studio: San Francisco Soundworks, San Francisco, CA
- Genre: Thrash metal
- Length: 55:09
- Label: Nuclear Blast
- Producer: Brian Joseph Dobbs and Death Angel

Death Angel chronology
Act III (1990)	The Art of Dying (2004)	Archives and Artifacts (2005)

Professional ratings
Review scores
Source	Rating
AllMusic	4/5 stars
Rock Hard	8.0/10

The Art of Dying is the fourth studio album by the American thrash metal band Death Angel, released on May 4, 2004. It was the band's first album with original material in 14 years since 1990's Act III. The album reached number 50 on the Billboard Top Independent Albums chart in 2004.

Death Angel guitarist Rob Cavestany once explained the origin of the album title as follows:

"That was actually an idea that (drummer Andy) Galeon brought in. He had seen an interview with Bruce Lee around that time, and he was speaking about this philosophy that he had gotten from the Tibetan Book of the Dead (a.k.a. the Bardo Thodol). He was describing the passage about the path you choose in your life, and the way that you live your life as the art of dying. Whereas if you are living in a morbid kind of way as though you're just on your way to your death slowly but surely, every day that you walk the earth, well, becomes the art of dying. Sometimes it's just the way that you treat your life that determines your destiny."

The Art of Dying sold around 2,100 copies in its first week in the U.S.

== Track listing ==
No.	Title	Lyrics	Music	Length
1.	"Intro/Thrown to the Wolves"	Rob Cavestany	Cavestany	7:26
2.	"5 Steps of Freedom"	Andy Galeon	Cavestany, Galeon, Dennis Pepa	4:47
3.	"Thicker than Blood"	Mark Osegueda	Cavestany	3:44
4.	"The Devil Incarnate"	Cavestany	Cavestany, Pepa	6:07
5.	"Famine"	Galeon	Cavestany, Galeon, Pepa	4:31
6.	"Prophecy"	Galeon	Galeon	5:11
7.	"No"	Osegueda	Cavestany	3:25
8.	"Spirit"	Galeon	Cavestany	6:24
9.	"Land of Blood"	Galeon	Cavestany, Pepa	3:39
10.	"Never Me"	Osegueda	Cavestany	5:17
11.	"Word to the Wise"	Cavestany	Cavestany	4:56
Total length:				55:09

== Credits ==
Death Angel

- Mark Osegueda – lead vocals
- Rob Cavestany – lead guitar, lead vocals on "Word to the Wise"
- Ted Aguilar – rhythm guitar
- Dennis Pepa – bass, lead vocals on "Land of Blood"
- Andy Galeon – drums, lead vocals on "Spirit"

Production

- Brian Joseph Dobbs – production, engineering, mixing
- Boon Spooner, Tony Espinoza – assistant engineering
- Dan Burns – digital editing
- Dave Collins – mastering
