= Death Angel =

American thrash metal band

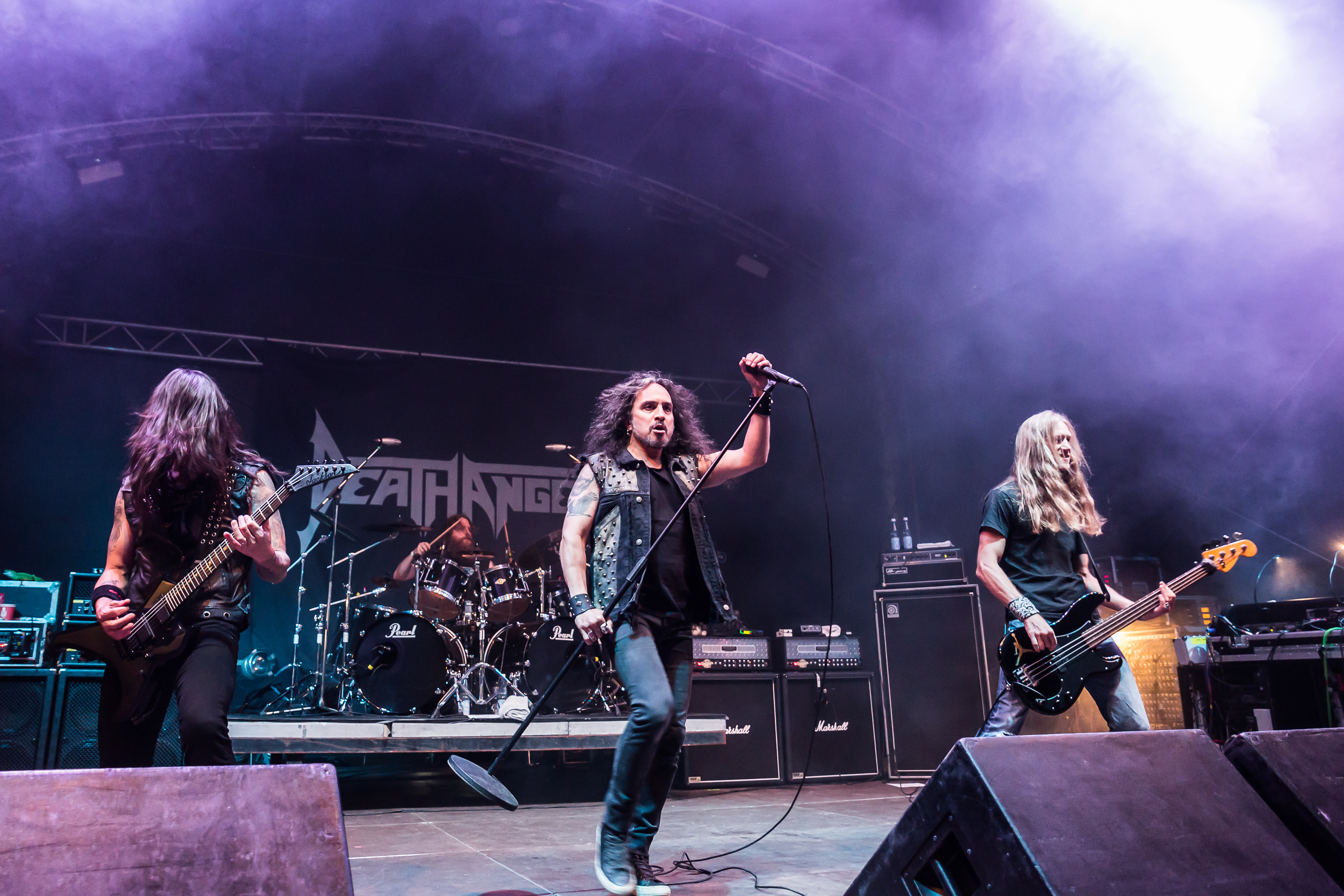
- Death Angel at Metal Frenzy 2018

Background information
- Origin: San Francisco, California, U.S.
- Genre: Thrash metal
- Works: Discography
- Years active: 1982–1991; 2001–present
- Labels: Enigma; Geffen; Nuclear Blast
- Spinoffs: The Organization
- Members: Rob Cavestany; Mark Osegueda; Ted Aguilar; Will Carroll; Damien Sisson
- Past members: Dennis Pepa; Gus Pepa; Andy Galeon; Chris Kontos; Sammy Diosdado
- Website: deathangel.us

Death Angel is a Filipino-American thrash metal band from San Francisco, California. They were originally active from 1982 to 1991, and again since 2001. They have released nine studio albums, two demo tapes, one box set, and three live albums. The band has gone through several lineup changes; lead guitarist Rob Cavestany has been the only constant member through the band's history. He and vocalist Mark Osegueda, who joined in 1984, are the only band members to appear on all of their studio albums.

The band initially rose to prominence in the Bay Area thrash metal scene of the 1980s, opening for Megadeth, Metallica, Slayer, Exodus, Testament, Overkill, D.R.I., Mercyful Fate and Possessed. They are credited as a leader of the second wave of thrash metal from the 1980s. Allmusic has described the band as part of the "Big Eight" – an expansion of the "Big Four" of thrash metal – alongside Testament, Exodus and Overkill. Following the underground success of their first two studio albums, The Ultra-Violence (1987) and Frolic Through the Park (1988), Death Angel signed to Geffen Records in 1989, and released its only album for the label, Act III, the following year.

While touring in support of Act III, then-drummer Andy Galeon was injured in a bus accident and took over a year to recover. This resulted in the band's breakup in 1991. Death Angel reformed in 2001 without original rhythm guitarist Gus Pepa at the Thrash of the Titans benefit concert for Testament frontman Chuck Billy. The band has since released six more albums, including Humanicide (2019), whose title track was nominated for a Grammy Award. They are currently working on their tenth studio album, tentatively due in 2028. The band also holds a semi-regular Christmas concert.

== History ==
=== Early years (1982–1988) ===
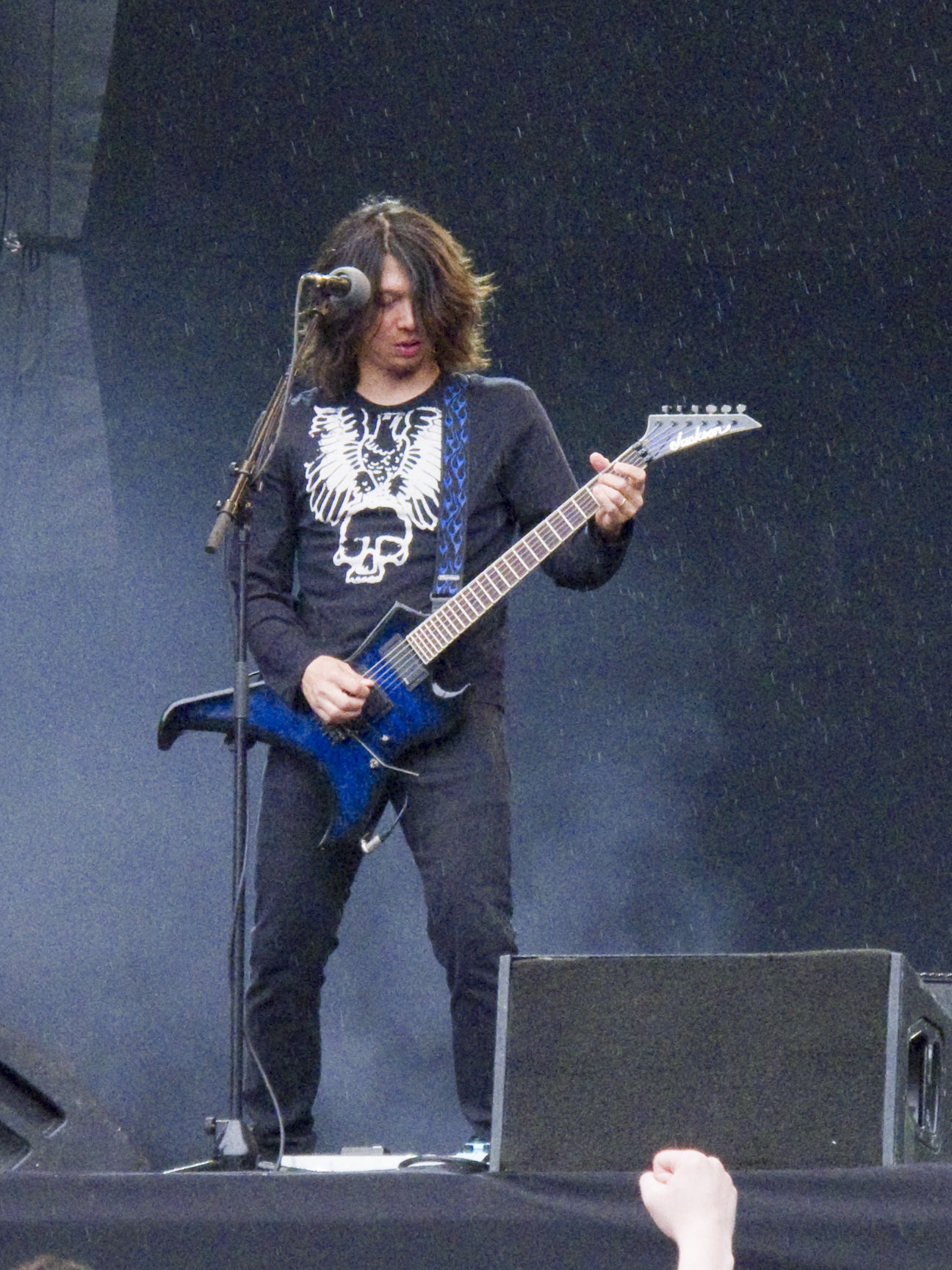
Guitarist Rob Cavestany is the bands longest tenured member

Death Angel was formed in San Francisco, California, in 1982 by cousins Rob Cavestany (lead guitar, backing vocals), Dennis Pepa (lead vocals, bass), Gus Pepa (rhythm guitar), and Andy Galeon (drums)—all of Filipino descent. After considering a number of different names for the band (including Dark Fury), Cavestany and Dennis Pepa settled on the name Death Angel after coming across a book by that title in a book store. In 1983, the band released their first demo, Heavy Metal Insanity, with Matt Wallace serving as producer. According to Mark Osegueda, the group was then "more like a metal band, more like Iron Maiden, Tygers of Pan Tang and stuff like that", as the so-called Bay Area thrash movement was only just beginning to rise to prominence at the time and make its influence felt. Osegueda, a second cousin of the other four members who had been working as their roadie, became the group's lead vocalist in 1984 and performed his first show with the band on a bill with Megadeth in April of that year (at one of the four Megadeth gigs to feature Kerry King on guitar).

Death Angel continued to play club gigs in and around the San Francisco Bay area for nearly two years, writing songs and refining their stage show. In 1985, the band recorded the Kill as One demo produced by Metallica's Kirk Hammett, whom they had met at a record store signing in 1983. The underground tape trading wave of the 1980s led to extensive distribution of the demo, bringing the band wide attention. Osegueda later recalled that prior to the release of the band's first album, "We were playing in L.A. and New York, and the crowd was singing our songs, because there was this underground tape trading .... That's what keeps it alive, and I think that's absolutely wonderful." In 1986, Death Angel performed at their Concord, California high school, Clayton Valley High School (now known as Clayton Valley Charter High School), at lunchtime. They dedicated the song "Mistress of Pain" to a vice principal.

The success of Kill as One led to a record deal with Enigma Records, who released Death Angel's debut album, The Ultra-Violence, in 1987. The band recorded the album when all the members were under 20 years old (with drummer Andy Galeon being the youngest at 14), and subsequently embarked on its first tour, supporting such bands as Exodus, Destruction, Voivod, Sacrifice and Whiplash. A video was filmed for "Voracious Souls", a song about a band of cannibals, but it never aired on MTV due to the nature of the lyrics.

Death Angel released their second album, Frolic Through the Park, in 1988. It featured more diverse material than the straightforward thrash of The Ultra-Violence. It included a cover version of the Kiss song "Cold Gin". The band released a video for the single "Bored" which received regular airplay on MTV's Headbangers Ball, and the song appeared two years later on the soundtrack to the movie Leatherface: The Texas Chainsaw Massacre III. The song was written under the seemingly unlikely influence of U2, and the guitar playing of the Edge in particular. Despite the success of Frolic Through the Park, the members of Death Angel have been somewhat critical of the album (including its production and musical direction), and in the band's 2015 documentary A Thrashumentuary, Cavestany called it the band's "bastard album" and an "odd album". Aside from "3rd Floor" and "Bored", Death Angel has rarely played songs from this album live again since they reunited in 2001.

Following the release of Frolic Through the Park, the band toured worldwide for the first time (with the likes of Motörhead, Testament, Flotsam and Jetsam, Overkill, Rigor Mortis, Sacred Reich, Forbidden, Vio-lence and Death) and found notable success in Japan, selling out two full Japanese tours.

=== Act III and breakup (1989–1991) ===
Geffen Records bought out the band's contract with Enigma Records in 1989 and released the third Death Angel album, Act III, in 1990. Produced by Max Norman (who had previously worked with Ozzy Osbourne, Megadeth, Savatage, Fates Warning and Loudness), the album showcased the band's newfound use of full-band backing vocals, while fusing elements of funk, thrash, and heavy metal with acoustic guitars to give the album a varied feel, while staying true to the group's heavy roots. The album featured the singles "Seemingly Endless Time" and "A Room with a View" (a ballad sung mostly by guitarist Rob Cavestany), and both songs received airplay on MTV's Headbangers Ball, but a mainstream breakthrough still proved elusive. The band released the "A Room with a View" video and single under the name "D.A." and Cavestany explained to a reporter at the time that he now found the band's original name "restricting. The name Death Angel seems to imply hardcore thrash gloom-and-doom death metal, and we're not like that at all. If I were presented with 10 records, and one of them was by a band called Death Angel, and I'd never heard of them, I'd stick that one on the bottom!"

Also in 1990, Enigma Records, already having sold its interest in the band to the Geffen label, illegally released and distributed Fall from Grace, an unauthorized live album featuring songs from their first two releases and recorded at the Paradiso in Amsterdam, Netherlands. The album was released without any input from the band members with regard to its songs, contents, credits, concepts, or artwork. The band learned of its existence when they stumbled upon it in a record store in Tucson, Arizona, on the night before a near-fatal auto accident. Enigma Records folded after the release, cashing in on the sales. The album was picked up, manufactured and distributed by Capitol Records, also possibly illegally.

Death Angel had embarked on what was scheduled to be a worldwide tour in support of Act III in 1990, selling out shows at the Warfield Theatre in San Francisco, The Ritz in New York, and England's Hammersmith Odeon, and touring, or playing selected shows, with the likes of Forbidden, Vicious Rumors, Sanctuary, Sepultura, Sacred Reich, Morbid Angel, Atheist, Forced Entry, Dead Horse and former Megadeth guitarist Chris Poland. While driving in Arizona en route to a show in Las Vegas, the group's tour bus crashed, and drummer Andy Galeon was critically injured, needing more than a year to recover. Cavestany said at the time that "[i]n a way, it made perfect sense to have a major accident right now, it really fit the story line. We've been pushing so hard for 8 years and just not getting that far, and getting so frustrated with not being where we should be after so long, it was time for something climactic to happen!" The band was also slated to be the opening act for the Clash of the Titans tour featuring Megadeth, Slayer, and Anthrax in the summer of 1991, but were ultimately replaced by Alice in Chains since they were unable to perform. Additionally, Death Angel and Geffen were planning to release a live album recorded at shows in the Bay Area, and the band was intending to tour a number of other countries it had not previously visited. According to Cavestany, they were invited to tour Europe with Annihilator and Judas Priest, supporting the latter on their Painkiller tour. Due to the bus accident, Death Angel declined and was replaced by Pantera.

Following the accident, Geffen Records and the band's manager pressured the group to hire another drummer and immediately go back to work. The band performed a few shows in Japan with drummer Chris Kontos, but when they declined to hire a long-term replacement, Geffen Records dropped them.

Osegueda left the group and moved to New York to pursue a life outside of music, and Cavestany later explained that "[w]e weren't going to try to replace him and with all that stuff happening we were just totally disgusted at how things had turned out and we felt that this was a sign that the band was not going to go on." The remaining members performed a few acoustic-only shows in the Bay Area, appearing as "the Past."

=== Post-breakup (1991–2001) ===
In the summer of 1991, with Galeon fully recovered, Death Angel's remaining members, minus Osegueda, reformed under the name the Organization (which was the title of a song from Act III), with Cavestany taking over lead vocal duties. The band focused more on funk and alternative rock than traditional metal. The Organization's first demo was recorded and produced at City College of San Francisco's multitrack studios by Eric Kauschen and Dana Galloway.

The Organization toured extensively throughout the United States and Europe, including two appearances at the Dynamo Open Air Festival in the Netherlands, a support slot on tour with Rob Halford's then-new band Fight, and as the main support act for Motörhead in Europe. Both 1993's The Organization and 1995's Savor the Flavor albums, distributed by Metal Blade Records, failed to make waves with the record-buying public, and Cavestany and Galeon disbanded.

Around 1992, Osegueda was invited to audition for Anthrax after the departure of Joey Belladonna. The band eventually hired John Bush of Armored Saint, and Anthrax guitarist Scott Ian later wrote that Osegueda "had a great voice but was strangely too metal for us."

In 1998, Cavestany and Galeon reunited with Osegueda for the first time since 1990. Along with bassist Michael Isaiah, they formed Swarm and released a four-track self-titled EP in 1999, and the five-song Devour EP in 2000. Swarm toured with Jerry Cantrell of Alice in Chains in 2000, and released the compilation album Beyond the End, which combined the contents of the two EPs with a cover of the Doors' "My Eyes Have Seen You", in 2003. Although Swarm did not become a commercial success, it did bring the core members of Death Angel back together, setting up an official reunion.

=== Reunion, The Art of Dying and Killing Season (2001–2008) ===
Death Angel officially reunited in August 2001 for Thrash of the Titans, a cancer benefit show for both Testament's Chuck Billy and Death's Chuck Schuldiner. Original guitarist Gus Pepa could not participate in the reunion since he was out of the country. At Cavestany's suggestion, and with Pepa's blessing, the band enlisted longtime friend and fan, Ted Aguilar, to handle rhythm guitar duties. Originally planned as a one-off show, the band received such a positive response that they played a string of other well-received gigs around the San Francisco area and a pair of European tours, despite the band not having issued an album in over a decade. They also participated in Wacken Open Air and the Bang your Head 2004. Osegueda had since announced his involvement in the band All Time Highs, but had emphasized that he was going to remain a member of Death Angel.

In 2004, 14 years after Act III, the band released The Art of Dying on Nuclear Blast records. Archives and Artifacts, a box set with remastered versions of the long out-of-print The Ultra-Violence and Frolic Through the Park, along with a bonus Rarities CD and DVD, followed in 2005.

In April 2007, they headlined the seventh Pulp Summer Slam in the Philippines. In August 2007, Rob Cavestany released a solo CD of acoustic songs called Lines on the Road, the material on which was written in collaboration with Gus Pepa, and performed by Cavestany (vocals, bass, guitar) Gus Pepa (guitar) and Andy Galeon (drums).

The band's fifth album, Killing Season, recorded at Dave Grohl's Studio 606 in Northridge, California, was released on February 26, 2008. The video for the album's track "Dethroned" debuted online on April 17, 2008, on Headbangers Blog.

=== Lineup changes, Relentless Retribution and The Dream Calls for Blood (2008–2014) ===
At a show at the Grand in San Francisco on October 28, 2008, Death Angel announced that founding member Dennis Pepa would be leaving the band, and that the show would be his final live performance with them. Citing creative differences, he stated: "I've been with Death Angel since its inception in the '80s and believe it is time for me to move on. Throughout my career with the band, I've brought a punk-influenced edge to the Death Angel sound, and as an open-minded musician in need of change, I'd like to diversify and explore other opportunities within and beyond the genre of metal.". On January 10, 2009, Death Angel announced the addition of bassist Sammy Diosdado to replace Pepa. Diosdado is a Bay Area native who previously played with the San Francisco hardcore band the Sick and is a member of the rock and roll outfit All Time Highs, which is fronted by Osegueda.

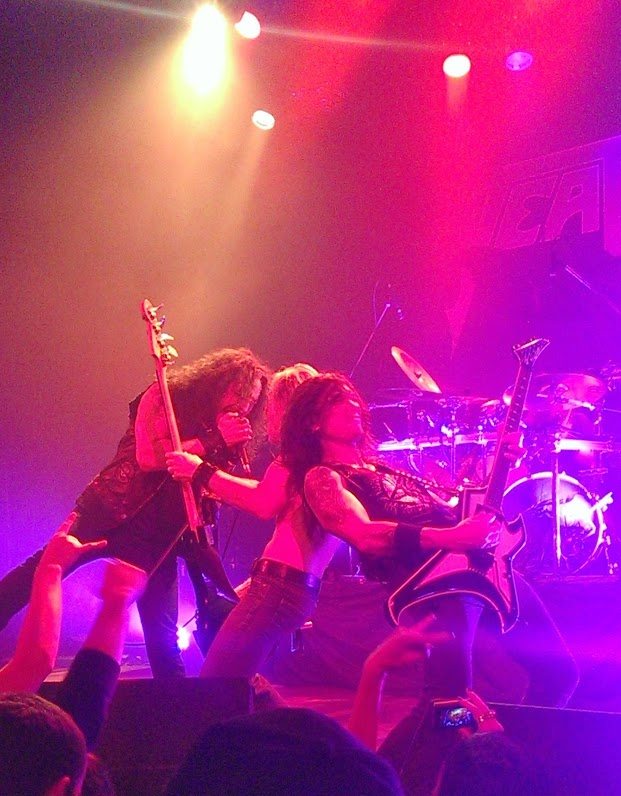
Death Angel headlining in Toronto, 2013

Drummer and founding member Andy Galeon left Death Angel in May 2009 for family and personal reasons. He stated in a September 2009 interview: "We had a tour booked, and basically, I had personal things I had to deal with — I had a newborn baby — and I just was like, 'Well, I've gotta do stuff at home.' We [the members of Death Angel] weren't communicating well or nothing. I wasn't about to ask them to not go [on the road], so I just said, 'I'll just leave then.'" This left Rob Cavestany as the only founding member remaining in the band. Galeon was replaced by Will Carroll (formerly of Scarecrow, Old Grandad and Vicious Rumors).

In November 2009, Sammy Diosdado was replaced by bassist Damien Sisson, formerly of the thrash bands Scarecrow and Potential Threat, as well as progressive instrumental trio Points North.

The band's sixth studio album, Relentless Retribution, was released in September 2010. The album was recorded at Audiohammer Studios in Sanford, Florida with producer Jason Suecof (Trivium, August Burns Red, the Black Dahlia Murder, All That Remains, Whitechapel, DevilDriver). It was the first Death Angel album recorded without longtime drummer Andy Galeon or either of the Pepa cousins. Death Angel toured in support of Relentless Retribution for two and a half years. They embarked on the European Thrashfest tour in late 2010 with Kreator, Exodus and Suicidal Angels, and supported Anthrax and Testament on the Worship Music tour in North America three times (in October–November 2011, January–February 2012 and September–October 2012).

Death Angel released their seventh album, The Dream Calls for Blood, on October 11, 2013. The album landed at No. 72 on the Billboard 200, making it the band's first chart entry since 1988's Frolic Through the Park, and their first to debut on the Top 100 on the American charts.

=== The Evil Divide and Humanicide (2015–2020) ===
Vocalist Mark Osegueda performing in 2017

Death Angel entered the studio in late 2015 to begin recording their eighth studio album, The Evil Divide. The album was released on May 27, 2016, and peaked at number 98 on the Billboard 200, giving them their second highest chart position. They toured for two-and-a-half years in support of the album, opening for Slayer on their Repentless tour in North America, Testament on their Brotherhood of the Snake tour in Europe, and Sepultura on their Machine Messiah tour in Australia, as well as taking part in the 2018 edition of the MTV Headbangers Ball European tour, also featuring Exodus, Sodom and Suicidal Angels.

The band began the recording sessions of their ninth studio album in mid-2018, again teaming up with producer Jason Suecof, who they had worked with since Relentless Retribution. The resulting album, Humanicide, was released on May 31, 2019. Prior to the album's release, they (along with Mothership) toured North America by supporting Overkill on their Wings of War tour. The band also toured Europe that summer, opening for bands such as Arch Enemy, Testament and Anthrax on selected dates as well as headlining their own shows, and was one of the performers on Megadeth's first-ever MegaCruise in October.

In November 2019 the title track to Humanicide was nominated for the Grammy Award for "Best Metal Performance", becoming Death Angel's first Grammy nomination. The award ultimately went to Tool for their song "7empest".

Death Angel continued touring into 2020 in support of Humanicide, including taking part in The Bay Strikes Back European tour with Testament and Exodus in February–March.

=== Will Carroll's illness and upcoming tenth album (2020–present) ===
After the Bay Strikes Back tour, which took place as the COVID-19 pandemic was beginning to spread around the world, drummer Will Carroll contracted COVID-19 and was admitted to an intensive care unit at a Northern California hospital. Gary Holt of Exodus and Testament members Chuck Billy and Steve Di Giorgio also fell ill after returning from the tour, as did various members of their crews. On April 2, 2020, after nearly two weeks on a ventilator, Carroll posted a lengthy update on his condition, thanking his family and friends for supporting him, and revealed that he had been "getting some new files from Mr. Rob Cavestany which will eventually be DA's 10th record." By mid-2020, Carroll had fully recovered from COVID, and confirmed in an interview with Rock Immortal in August that he and Cavestany were already working on new material for the next Death Angel album. In December 2021, Osegueda stated that the band had "started writing in the very, very early stages" for their new album, but indicated that its release could be pushed back to 2023, due to the COVID-19 pandemic and their tour schedule for 2022. They began recording demos for the album in March 2022, and progress continued to be slow by January 2024, when Carroll confirmed that he "tracked drums for a demo of a new Death Angel song".

On October 9, 2020, without prior announcement Death Angel released the digital EP Under Pressure. Unlike previous releases, it is almost entirely acoustic. It contains a cover of the Queen song "Under Pressure", one new original song "Faded Remains", and remakes of the tracks "A Room with a View" from Act III and "Revelation Song" from Humanicide. The band released a new live album on November 26, 2021, titled The Bastard Tracks, which was recorded at the Great American Music Hall in San Francisco on May 22 where Death Angel played tracks that had rarely or never before been played live.

Death Angel resumed touring in the spring of 2022 by supporting Testament and Exodus on the North American leg of The Bay Strikes Back tour, which was initially set to take place in October and November 2021 but the COVID-19 pandemic caused the tour to be rescheduled for another six months. They performed at the Wacken Open Air festival in 2022. The band toured with Testament and Exodus again in Europe during the summer of 2022, and then in North America in the fall as part of the Bay Strikes Back tour. Death Angel continued touring in 2023, including supporting Kreator and Sepultura on the Klash of the Titans tour in North America, followed by an Asian tour in the fall with Testament and Exodus, and co-headlining the Night of the Living Thrash European tour with Sacred Reich.

Death Angel's first song in six years, "Wrath (Bring Fire)", was released on May 1, 2025 to streaming services. Although it was unclear if "Wrath (Bring Fire)" was a one-off single or would appear on the band's upcoming tenth album, they toured in support of the single with a European tour called the "Summer of Wrath". On November 6, 2025, Death Angel released another single, "Cult of the Used", to coincide with their U.S. tour celebrating the 35th anniversary of Act III. A month later, Osegueda stated in an interview with Full Metal Jackie that the band's new album would likely not be released until late 2026 or early 2027. While a new album still did not surface, Death Angel released another one-off single "The Never Was" on November 5, 2026 to coincide with their upcoming European and Australian tour dates. Around that time, Osegueda stated the new album would likely be released in the first quarter of 2028.

The band toured in the spring and summer of 2026 with Vio-lence and Incite as support acts. This includes festival appearances at Milwauke Metal Fest and Welcome to Rockville in Daytona Beach, Florida. They will also appear at Maryland Deathfest. On January 27, 2027, Death Angel will host a benefit concert for founding bass player Dennis Pepa at the DNA Lounge in San Francisco, California. Current and former members of Exodus, Slayer and Testament will also appear at the event.

== Musical style and Legacy ==
Death Angel is a thrash metal band and has been referred to as one of the "founding pillars of the Bay Area thrash metal scene." They are regularly included as a member of the big eight" of the genre, alongside Metallica, Megadeth, Slayer, Anthrax, Testament, Exodus, and Overkill. Alternatively, Death Angel has been called one of the "Other Big Four" or the "Second Big Four" of thrash metal, alongside Testament, Overkill, and Exodus.

AllMusic wrote that the band combined "serious guitar crunch and speed with technical expertise, they create complex thrash filled with time changes and tricky arrangements." According to Guitar World, the band uses "rapid-fire tempos with unusual time signatures, abrupt rhythm shifts and off-kilter riffs that sometimes sounded forcefully welded together." Loudwire added that the band "contradicted their own youth with the stunning display of technical thrash found on 1987's The Ultra-Violence, and then continued to challenge themselves – with two more, increasingly mature long players harnessing that precocious musicianship into ever more appealing song structures." They are also known for their progressive style, incorporating different elements to their sound as their career has gone these include acoustic bits along with piano notes. With their 2016 album The Evil Divide, the band incorporated elements of melodic and groove metal. Guitarist Rob Cavestany has noted that since ever since their early years the band has pushed for creativity not wanting to get "stuck recreating their past."

Death Angel's influences include Black Sabbath, Kiss, Led Zeppelin, UFO, Scorpions, Judas Priest, Iron Maiden, Exodus, Slayer and Metallica. Initially, the band was inspired by many classic metal acts from the New wave of British heavy metal. However, after the band discovered Metallica, they began to evolve into their traditional thrash metal sound, with guitarist Rob Cavestany later recalling, "Seeing Metallica play was the next thing after we saw Kiss, when we're all like, 'Oh shit! We've got to change our style. We've got to get heavier and faster.'"

In 2025, Zahra Huselid of Screen Rant included Death Angel in the site's list of "10 Best Thrash Metal Bands Who Weren't The Big Four". Revolver wrote, "If Death Angel came up anywhere else but the Bay, then they would've been unanimously heralded as the best band in town. The San Francisco quintet were already a formidable thrash machine by the time they released their 1987 debut, The Ultra-Violence, and the creative leaps they took on its subsequent follow-ups solidified them as one of the genre’s premier experimentalists." Darkest Hour has cited the band as an influence.

== Band members ==
=== Members ===
Death Angel live at Metal Frenzy 2018 in Germany

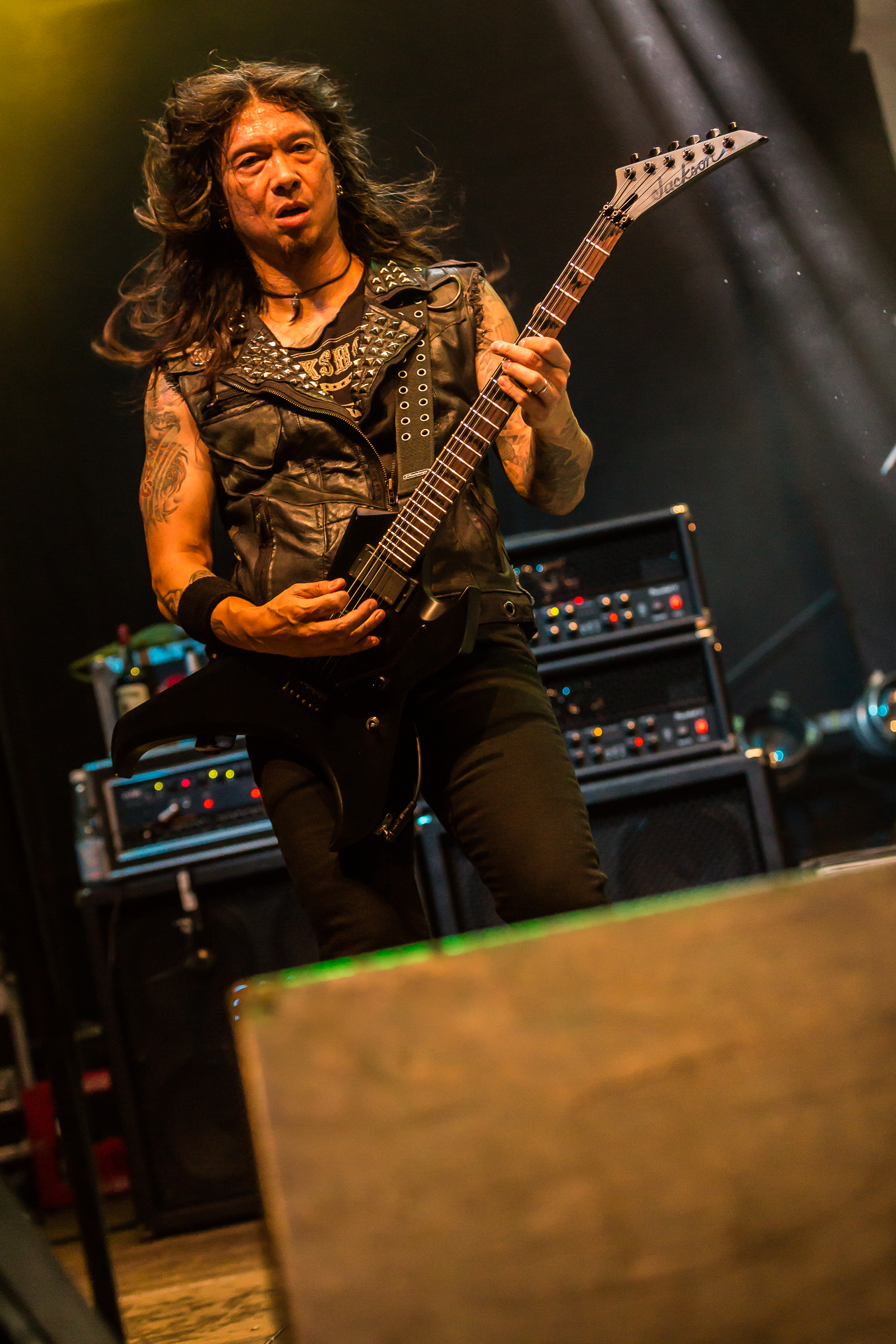
Rob Cavestany

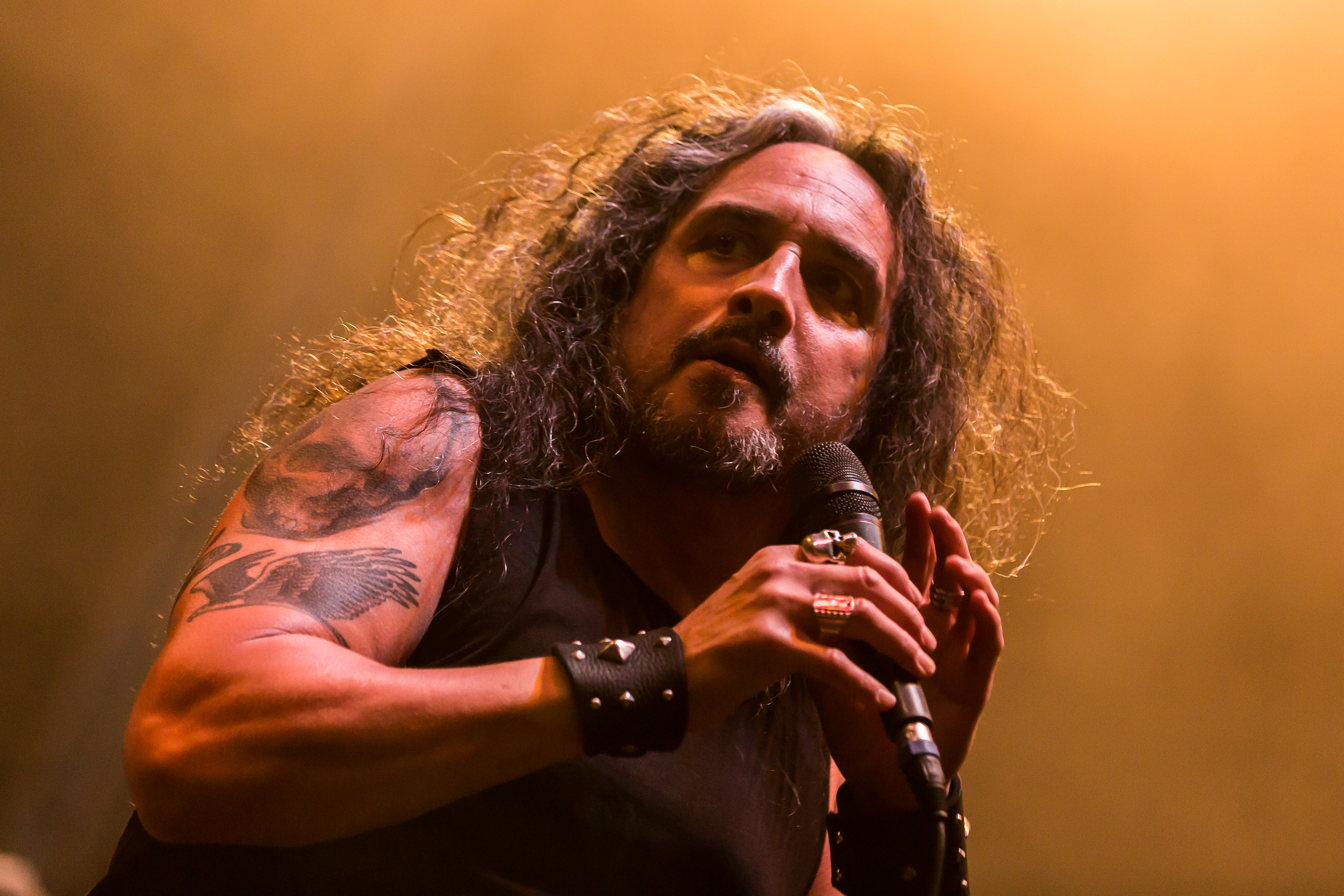
Mark Osegueda

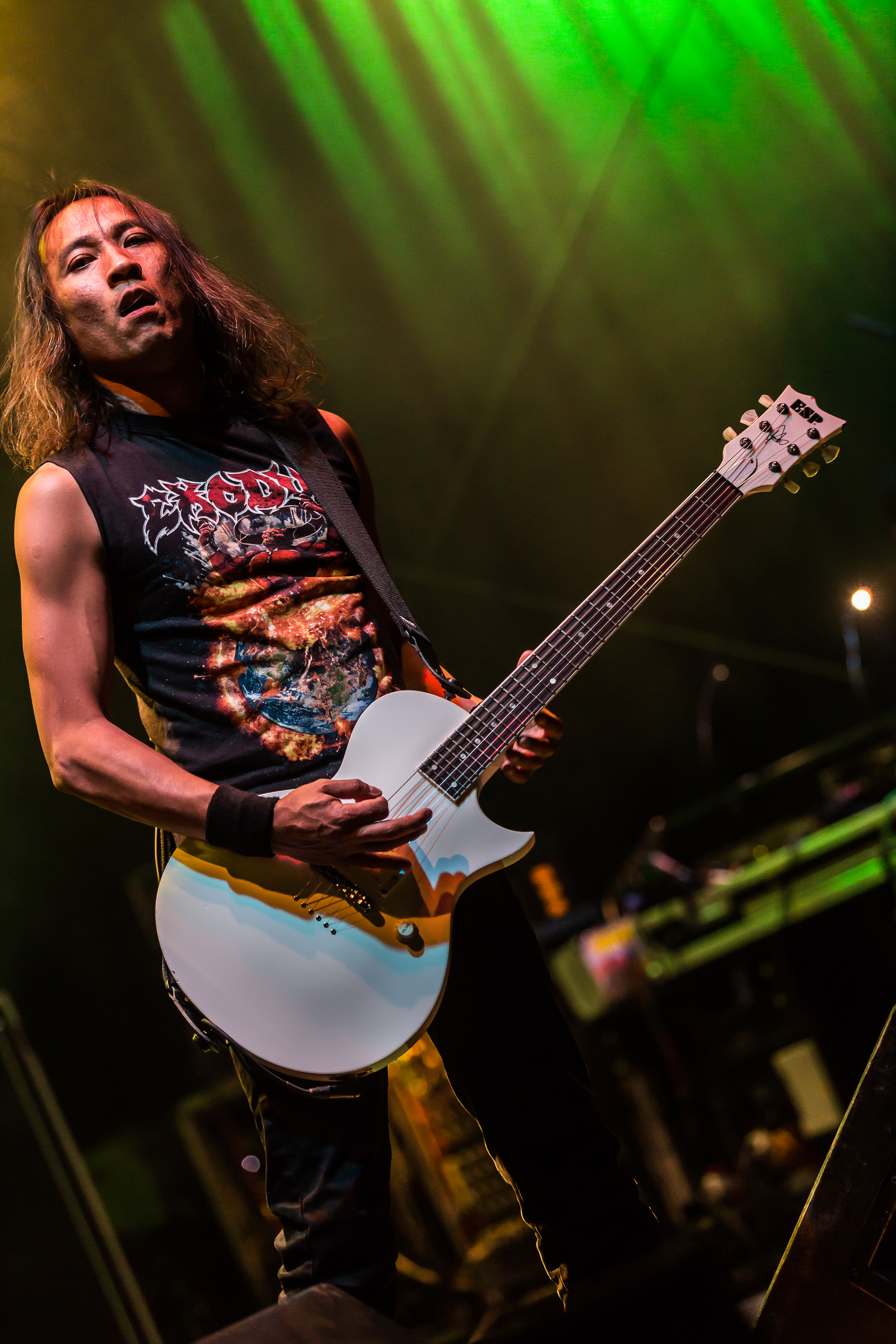
Ted Aguilar

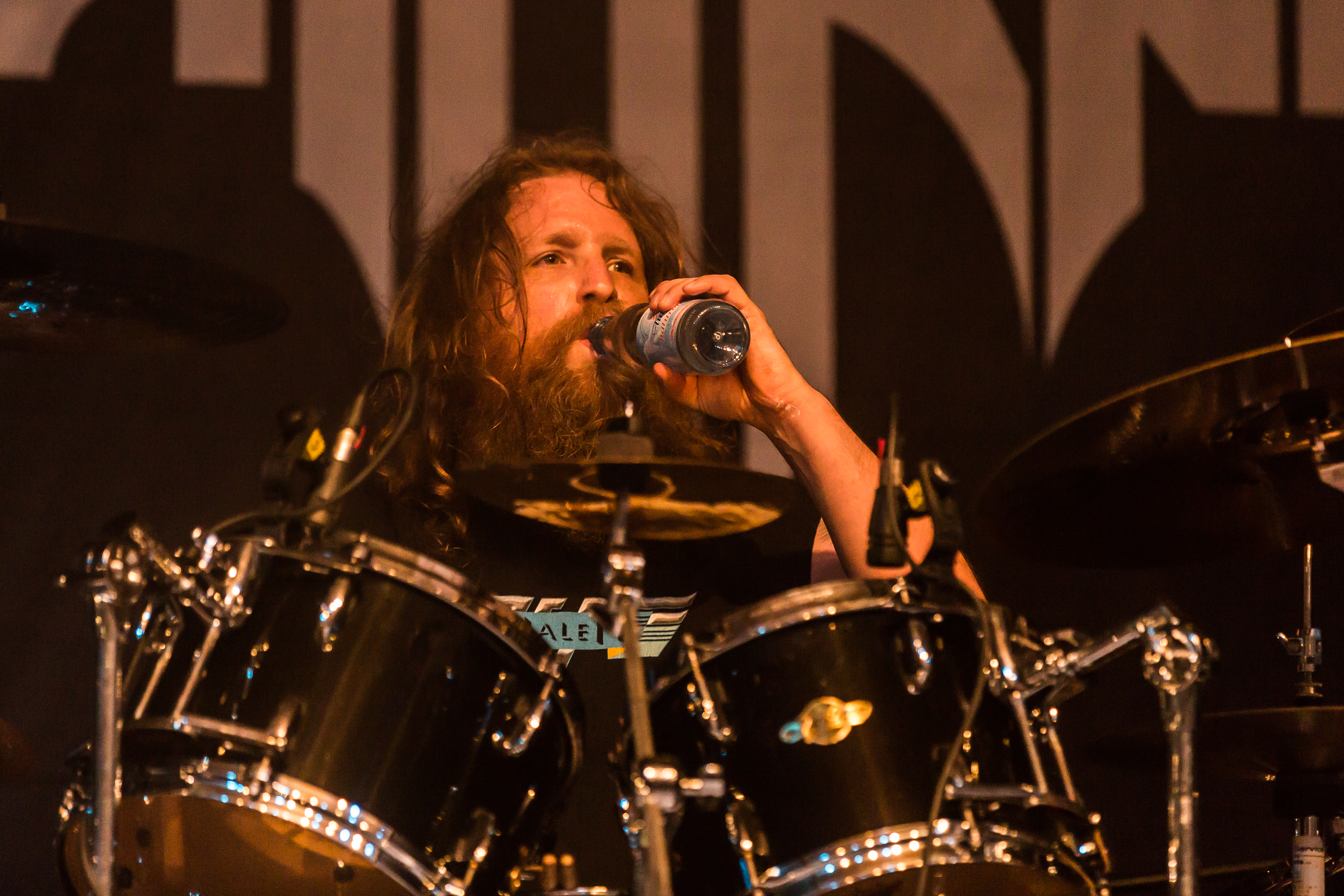
Will Carroll

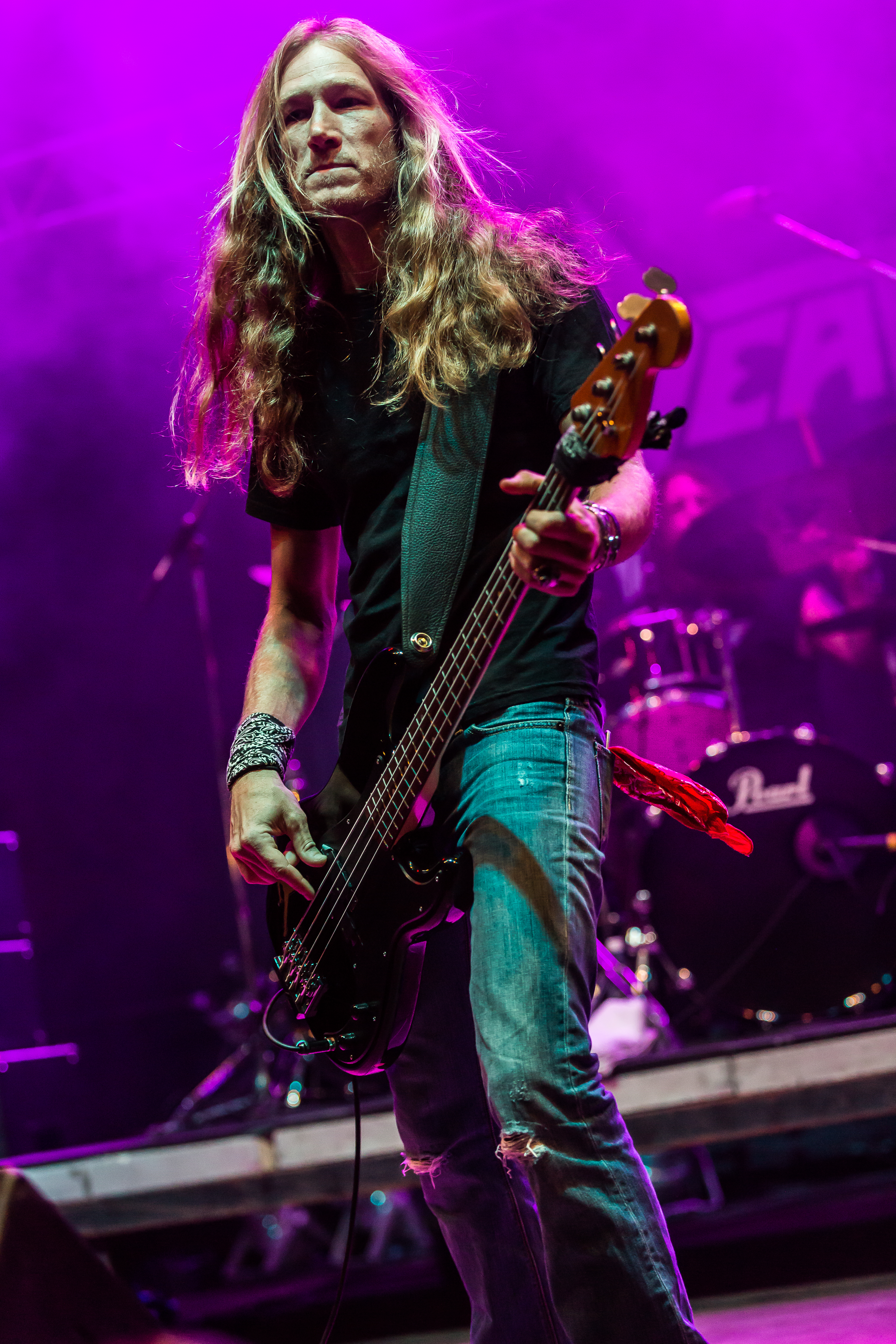
Damien Sisson

Current

- Rob Cavestany – lead guitar, backing vocals (1982–1991, 2001–present)
- Mark Osegueda – lead vocals (1984–1991, 2001–present)
- Ted Aguilar – rhythm guitar, backing vocals (2001–present)
- Will Carroll – drums (2009–present)
- Damien Sisson – bass (2009–present)

Former

- Dennis Pepa – bass (1982–1991, 2001–2008), backing vocals (1984–1991, 2001–2008), lead vocals (1982–1984)
- Gus Pepa – rhythm guitar, backing vocals (1982–1991)
- Andy Galeon – drums, backing vocals (1982–1991, 2001–2009)
- Sammy Diosdado – bass, backing vocals (2008–2009)

Former touring musicians

- Chris Kontos – drums (1991; substitute for Andy Galeon)

== Discography ==
- The Ultra-Violence (1987)
- Frolic Through the Park (1988)
- Act III (1990)
- The Art of Dying (2004)
- Killing Season (2008)
- Relentless Retribution (2010)
- The Dream Calls for Blood (2013)
- The Evil Divide (2016)
- Humanicide (2019)

== Awards and nominations ==
Grammy Awards

Year	Nominee / work	Award	Result
2020	"Humanicide"	Best Metal Performance	Nominated

Loudwire Music Awards

Year	Nominee / work	Award	Result
2017	The Evil Divide	Best Metal Album	Nominated
