= Frolic Through the Park =

Studio album by Death Angel
- Released: July 5, 1988
- Recorded: March 1988
- Studio: Fantasy Studios, Berkeley, California
- Genre: Thrash metal
- Length: 56:17
- Label: Restless/Enigma
- Producer: Davy Vain, Rob Cavestany, Andy Galeon

Death Angel chronology
The Ultra-Violence (1987)	Frolic Through the Park (1988)	Act III (1990)

Singles from Frolic Through the Park
- 1. "Bored" Released: 1988

Frolic Through the Park is the second studio album by the American thrash metal band Death Angel, released in 1988. This was the band's last full-length studio album released on Enigma Records before signing to Geffen Records in 1989.

It is considered an essential release in the thrash metal genre.

== Overview ==
Frolic Through the Park marked a change in style for Death Angel and is considered by many to be one of the band's darkest works. While retaining the speed and thrash roots of its predecessor The Ultra-Violence (1987), the album saw the band implement a more experimental and diverse direction, drawing elements and influences from funk, progressive, hard rock, hardcore punk and then-current music (particularly early U2). The band would continue this experimentation on their next album, Act III (1990).

Despite being hailed as a fan favorite, and including one of their most popular songs "Bored" (whose music video had heavy rotation on MTV's Headbangers Ball), the members of Death Angel (particularly frontman Mark Osegueda and guitarist Rob Cavestany) have been very critical of this album, including its sound and production. In the band's documentary A Thrashumentuary, Cavestany referred to Frolic Through the Park as both their "bastard album" and an "odd album". While the band has rarely performed the majority of the album's songs live since their initial disbandment in 1991, "3rd Floor" and "Bored" are the only songs from Frolic Through the Park to have appeared in their live setlists more frequently after their comeback in 2001.

Osegueda revealed in a 2003 interview that the source of the title "Why You Do This" was a line in the film The Exorcist. "Bored" was used in a scene in the 1990 movie Leatherface: The Texas Chainsaw Massacre III.

== Reception and awards ==
Professional ratings
Review scores
Source	Rating
AllMusic	4/5 stars
Collector's Guide to Heavy Metal	9/10
Kerrang!	4.25/5 stars

Frolic Through the Park was ranked number eight in Loudwire's top ten list of "Thrash Albums NOT Released by the Big 4".

== Track listing ==
No.	Title	Lyrics	Music	Length
1.	"3rd Floor"	Mark Osegueda	Rob Cavestany	4:58
2.	"Road Mutants"	Cavestany	Cavestany, Dennis Pepa	3:45
3.	"Why You Do This"	Osegueda	Cavestany	5:33
4.	"Bored"	Cavestany	Cavestany	3:29
5.	"Confused"	Cavestany	Cavestany, Gus Pepa	7:26
6.	"Guilty of Innocence"	Cavestany	Cavestany	4:26
7.	"Open Up"	Cavestany	Cavestany	5:45
8.	"Shores of Sin"	Cavestany	Cavestany, D. Pepa	6:30
9.	"Cold Gin" (Kiss cover)	Ace Frehley	Frehley	4:23
10.	"Mind Rape"	Andy Galeon	Cavestany	5:32
11.	"Dehumanization"	Cavestany	Cavestany	7:01
12.	"Silent Killer"	Cavestany, Pepa	Cavestany, Pepa	4:22
13.	"Witches of Knave"	Cavestany	Cavestany	5:24
Total length:				56:17

CD bonus track
No.	Title	Lyrics	Music	Length
5.	"Devil's Metal"	Cavestany	Cavestany	5:31

== Personnel ==
Death Angel

- Mark Osegueda – lead vocals
- Rob Cavestany – lead guitar, backing vocals
- Gus Pepa – rhythm guitar, backing vocals, co-lead guitar on track 3
- Dennis Pepa – bass, backing vocals
- Andy Galeon – drums, backing vocals

Additional personnel;

- Bob Ross – "Shores of Sin" intro and outro

Production

- Rob Cavestany – production
- Andy Galeon – production
- Death Angel – mixing
- Davy Vain – mixing
- Michael Rosen – engineering, mixing
