= Hell's Heroes (music festival) =

Music festival in Texas

Hell's Heroes in an annual music festival held at the White Oak Music Hall in Houston focused on heavy metal music and extreme metal. It began in 2018 and has attracted attendees from around the world. Metal Injection said it was "one of North America's premier heavy music festivals." The 2024 lineup consisted of acts such as Sodom, Queensrÿche, Candlemass, Solitude Aeturnus, Rotting Christ, Forbidden, Autopsy, Doro, Demolition Hammer, Tank, Watchtower. Notable performers from the 2025 lineup included Saxon, D.R.I., Crimson Glory, Raven, Satan, Goatwhore, Omen, Abbath, Coroner, Warlord and Enforcer. The 2026 lineup will include acts such as Voivod, At War, Bulldozer, Loudness, Doro, Toxic Holocaust and Enslaved.

== See also ==
- Shamrock Slaughter
- Wrecking Ball Madness
- Metal Threat
- Flatline Fest
- Maryland Deathfest
- Milwaukee Metal Fest
- Big Texas Metal Fest
- Toledo Death Fest
