= Michigan Metal Fest =

Michigan Metal Fest is an American two-day music festival focused on heavy metal music. It is held in August at the Leila Arboretum in Battle Creek, Michigan. According to the Battle Creek Enquirer, the festival is attended by thousands. The festival also features live painting in addition to live music.

== History ==
The festival was founded by landscaper Steve Maple in 2017. He said: "Nothing super metal about me. But I love that we're bringing the economy of metal to the city. [...] I want to put this town back on the map with something that matters to regular people like me." Hatebreed, Chelsea Grin and Hed PE headlined the festival in 2019. The festival was not held in 2020 due to the COVID-19 pandemic, and was cancelled again in 2021 due to "additional issues," according to WRKR. The festival returned in 2023. Dying Fetus, Ov Sulfur, and Within The Ruins headlined the festival in 2025. The 2026 lineup will consist of a Killer's Confession and Crossbreed.

== See also ==
- Shamrock Slaughter
