= List of Death (metal band) members =

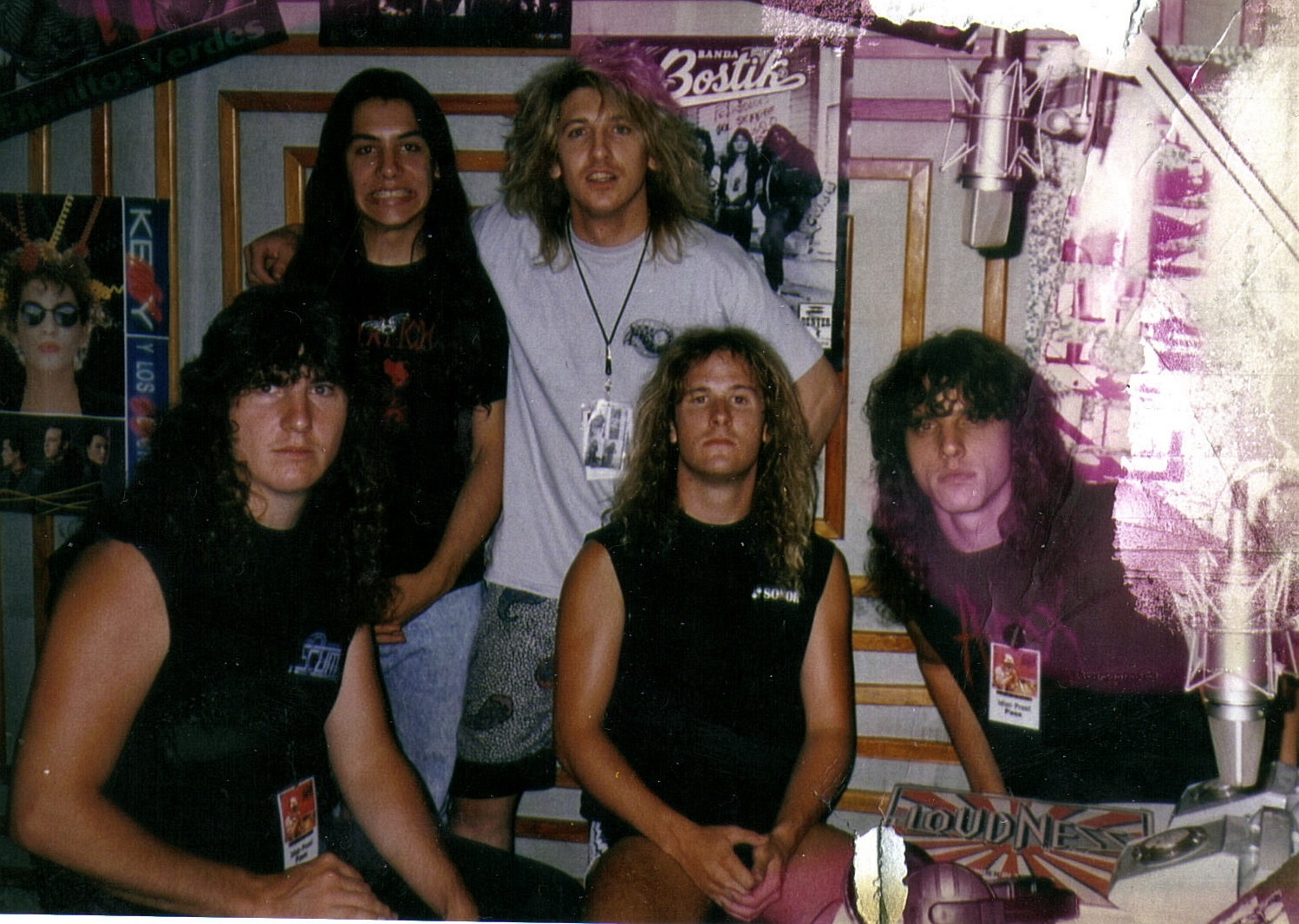
Death in 1989.

Death was an American death metal band from Altamonte Springs, Florida. Formed in 1983 under the name Mantas, the group originally consisted of guitarist Chuck Schuldiner, second guitarist Frederick "Rick Rozz" DeLillo, and drummer and vocalist Barney "Kam" Lee. The band went through many personnel changes during its tenure, before disbanding in December 2001 upon Schuldiner's death. The final lineup of Death featured Schuldiner on guitars and vocals, Shannon Hamm on guitars, Richard Christy on drums, (since 1997) and Scott Clendenin on bass (since 1998).

== History ==
=== 1983–1987 ===
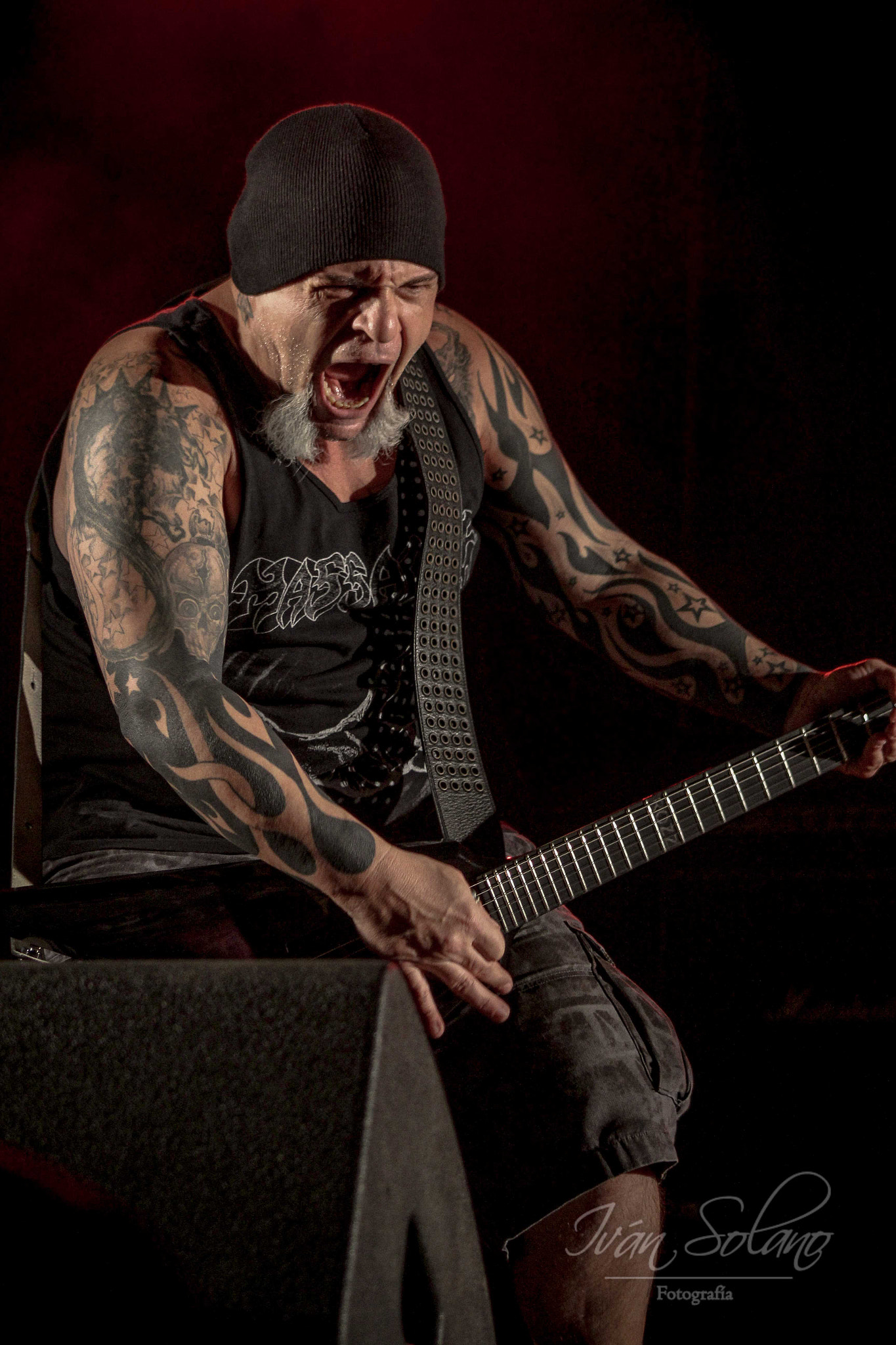
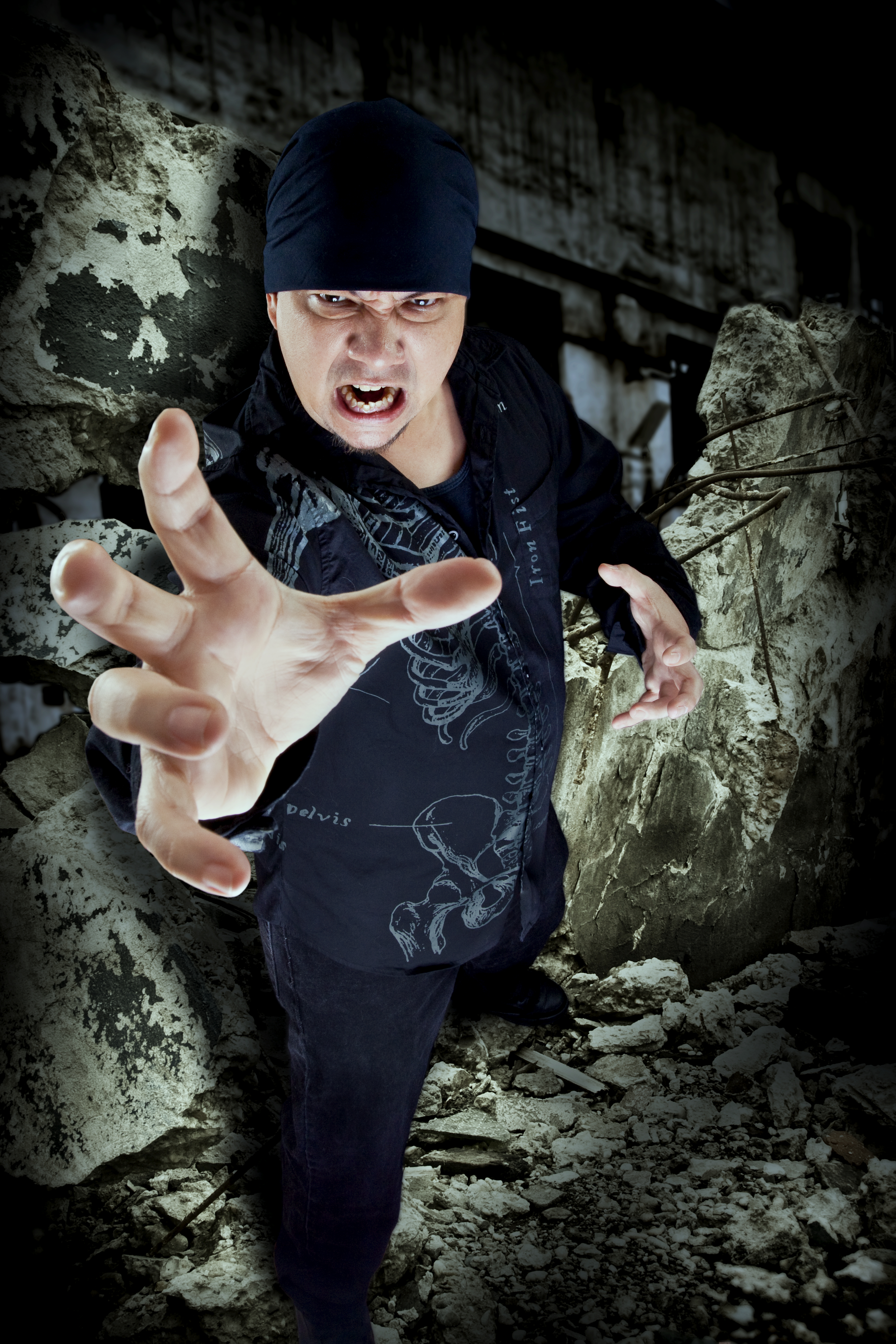
Guitarist Rick Rozz (left) and drummer Kam Lee (right) were founding members of Mantas alongside Chuck Schuldiner. Both performed on the band's first three official demos.

Chuck Schuldiner formed Mantas in 1983 with drummer/vocalist Kam Lee and guitarist Rick Rozz. The band recorded its first rehearsal demo in early 1984, which is known unofficially as Emotional. The recording featured a temporary bassist named Dave Tett, who left after just a few rehearsals and was the band's only bassist during its tenure as Mantas. The group released its first official demo, Death by Metal, in the summer of 1984. In September, the band briefly broke up for "two or three weeks", and returned in October under the new name of Death. The Reign of Terror demo was recorded later that month.

Shortly after the recording of the Infernal Death demo in March 1985, Rozz left Death; Schuldiner and Lee recorded the Rigor Mortis demo the next month. Guitarist Matt Olivo and bassist Scott Carlson of the band Genocide joined the band that May. However after Lee left and they struggled to find a replacement, the pair left after just a few months. In September, Schuldiner relocated to San Francisco, California and built a new Death lineup with bassist Erik Meade and former D.R.I. drummer Eric Brecht. The trio released the Back from the Dead demo in October, before both new members left in December and Schuldiner returned to Florida.

Death took a brief hiatus in early 1986, while Schuldiner briefly rehearsed with Canadian group Slaughter. In March, the guitarist and vocalist moved to San Francisco again, where he formed a new incarnation of Death with drummer Chris Reifert. Working as a two-piece, with Schuldiner handling bass duties, the group issued the demo Mutilation in April, which led to the band signing a deal with Combat Records. The band briefly played with bassist Steve Di Giorgio of Sadus, with whom they shared practice space. Di Giorgio also played on a test pressing of Scream Bloody Gore. In November the band recorded its debut full-length album, Scream Bloody Gore, which was issued the following May. Before the album's release, the duo was briefly joined by second guitarist John Hand.

=== 1987–1992 ===
Around the time of the release of Scream Bloody Gore, Schuldiner moved back to Florida without Reifert, who opted to stay in San Francisco. He subsequently enlisted former guitarist Rick Rozz along with bassist Terry Butler and drummer Bill Andrews from Massacre for a new incarnation of Death. The group issued Leprosy in 1988, however Butler did not feature on the album and bass was instead performed by Schuldiner. During the subsequent touring cycle, Rozz was dismissed from Death and temporarily replaced by Cynic's Paul Masvidal for a handful of Mexican shows.

After "a few weeks" with Mark Carter, the band was joined by guitarist James Murphy in the summer of 1989. Spiritual Healing was recorded at the end of the year and released the following February. During the subsequent tour, Murphy was fired and the guitarist role changed a number of times – first, Masvidal returned to complete a run of shows in April 1990, before Evildead's Albert Gonzales took over for shows between August and October. When Schuldiner refused to perform in Europe at the end of the year due to poor management and organization of the tour, the remaining members completed the tour without him, using members of the road crew as stand-ins.

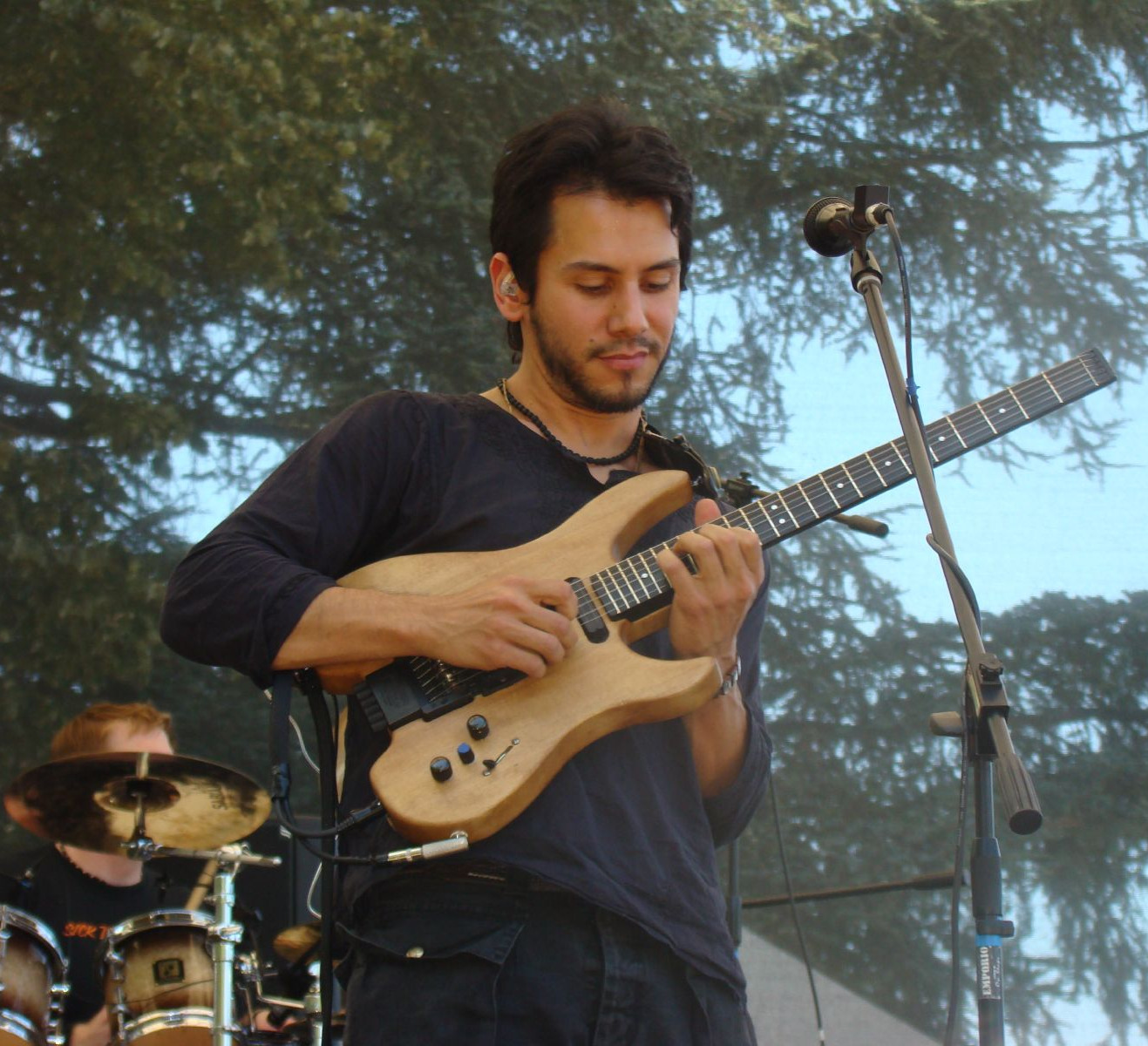
Paul Masvidal had two tenures as a touring guitarist for Death, followed by one as a permanent member.

Schuldiner parted ways with Butler and Andrews after their tour without him, and in April 1991 he returned to record Human with Masvidal, Sadus bassist Steve Di Giorgio, and Masvidal's Cynic bandmate Sean Reinert on drums. Di Giorgio was unable to commit to the band full-time due to commitments with Sadus, so he was replaced on the subsequent touring cycle by Scott Carino. In spring 1992, Death was forced to cancel a run of shows in the UK due to financial issues.

=== 1993–2001 ===
In early 1993, Schuldiner reunited with bassist Steve Di Giorgio to record Individual Thought Patterns, which also featured King Diamond guitarist Andy LaRocque and former Dark Angel drummer Gene Hoglan. LaRocque was unable to commit full-time to Death, so he was replaced for European festivals in the spring and a US tour in the summer by Ralph Santolla. For a European run later in the year, Forbidden's Craig Locicero took over when Santolla returned to his main band Eyewitness.

By early 1995, Di Giorgio had left Death and LaRocque had confirmed his inability to return. Schuldiner asked former Watchtower bassist Doug Keyser to join the band, but he declined, which led Schuldiner to add bassist Kelly Conlon and guitarist Bobby Koelble in time for the recording of Symbolic. After the album's release, the group performed at several European festivals, before Conlon was dismissed and replaced for subsequent tour dates by Brian Benson.

Early the next year, Schuldiner announced the disbandment of Death and the formation of Control Denied, following a disagreement with Roadrunner Records. The new group initially featured vocalist B.C. Richards, though he left the band in 1997. An early lineup of the band included guitarist Shannon Hamm, bassist Benson and drummer Chris Williams.

Death returned in the summer of 1997, with Control Denied members Hamm, Scott Clendenin (who by that time had replaced Benson on bass) and Richard Christy (the replacement for drummer Williams) featuring in the new incarnation of the band. Di Giorgio briefly returned and played bass on demos for The Sound of Perseverance, which was Death's final studio album and was released in 1998 with Clendenin on bass. After a tour promoting the album, Schuldiner returned to focus on recording the second Control Denied album. However, in 1999 he was diagnosed with pontine glioma, for which he underwent surgery in January 2000. Despite initially improving, Schuldiner's condition worsened in 2001, and, on December 13, he died. Shortly before his death, the band issued its first two live albums.

== Members ==
Image	Name	Years active	Instruments	Release contributions
	Chuck Schuldiner	1983–1995; 1997–2001 (until his death)	guitars; bass (1983, 1983–1985, 1986–1987); vocals	all Death releases
	Barney "Kam" Lee	1983–1985	drums; vocals	Death by Metal (1984); Reign of Terror (1984); Infernal Death (1985); Rigor Mortis (1985)
	Rick Rozz (Frederick DeLillo)	1983–1985; 1987–1989	guitars	Death by Metal (1984); Reign of Terror (1984); Infernal Death (1985); Leprosy (1988); Chicago, IL 01.21.1988 (2020); Tampa, FL 02.10.1989 (2020); New Rochelle, NY 12.03.1988 (2020)
	Dave Tett	1984	bass	none (performed on the first Mantas rehearsal tape)
	Scott Carlson	1985	bass; vocals	none (performed on Death rehearsal tapes 7, 8, 9, 10 and 11)
	Matt Olivo	1985	guitars	none (performed on Death rehearsal tapes 7, 8, 9, 10 and 11)
	Erik Meade	1985	bass	Back from the Dead (1985)
	Eric Brecht	1985	drums	Back from the Dead (1985)
	Chris Reifert	1986–1987	drums	Mutilation (1986); Scream Bloody Gore (1987)
	Steve Di Giorgio	1986; 1991 (session); 1993–1995; 1997-1998	bass	Human (1991); Individual Thought Patterns (1993); Detroit, MI 1993 (2020)
	John Hand	1986	guitars	none
	Terry Butler	1987–1990	bass	Spiritual Healing (1990); Chicago, IL 01.21.1988 (2020); Tijuana 10.06.1990 (2020); Live 1990, 1991 Unknown (2020); Tampa, FL 02.10.1989 (2020); New Rochelle, NY 12.03.1988 (2020)
	Bill Andrews	1987–1990	drums	Leprosy (1988); Spiritual Healing (1990); Chicago, IL 01.21.1988 (2020); Tijuana 10.06.1990 (2020); Live 1990, 1991 Unknown (2020); Tampa, FL 02.10.1989 (2020); New Rochelle, NY 12.03.1988 (2020)
	Paul Masvidal	1989 (touring); 1990 (touring); 1991–1992	guitars	Human (1991); Live 1990, 1991 Unknown (2020); Belgium 12.23.1991 (2020)
	Mark Carter	1989	guitars	none
	James Murphy	1989–1990	guitars	Spiritual Healing (1990)
	Albert Gonzales	1990 (touring)	guitars	Live 1990, 1991 Unknown (2020)
	Louie Carrisalez	1990 (touring)	vocals	none
	Walter Trachsler	1990 (touring)	guitars	none
	Sean Reinert	1991–1992 (died 2020)	drums	Human (1991); Live 1990, 1991 Unknown (2020); Belgium 12.23.1991 (2020)
	Scott Carino	1991–1992 (touring only)	bass	Human (1991) – performed on one track only; Live 1990, 1991 Unknown (2020); Belgium 12.23.1991 (2020)
	Gene Hoglan	1992–1995	drums	Individual Thought Patterns (1993); Symbolic (1995); Montreal 06.22.1995 (2020); Showcase Theater, CA 07.14.1995 (2020); Detroit, MI 1993 (2020)
	Andy LaRocque	1993 (session)	guitars	Individual Thought Patterns (1993)
	Ralph Santolla	1993 (touring) (died 2018)	guitars	Detroit, MI 1993 (2020)
	Craig Locicero	1993 (touring)	guitars	none
	Bobby Koelble	1994-1995	guitars	Symbolic (1995); Montreal 06.22.1995 (2020); Showcase Theater, CA 07.14.1995 (2020)
	Kelly Conlon	1994-1995	bass	Symbolic (1995)
	Brian Benson	1995 (touring)	bass	Montreal 06.22.1995 (2020); Showcase Theater, CA 07.14.1995 (2020)
	Shannon Hamm	1997–2001	guitars	all Death releases from The Sound of Perseverance (1998) to Vivus! (2012)
	Richard Christy	1997–2001	drums	all Death releases from The Sound of Perseverance (1998) to Vivus! (2012)
	Scott Clendenin	1998–2001 (died 2015)	bass	all Death releases from The Sound of Perseverance (1998) to Vivus! (2012)

== Lineups ==
Period	Members	Releases
Early 1983 (known as Mantas)	Chuck Schuldiner – guitars, bass; Kam Lee – drums, vocals; Rick Rozz – guitars	None
Early – spring 1984 (known as Mantas)	Chuck Schuldiner – guitars; Kam Lee – drums, vocals; Rick Rozz – guitars; Dave Tett – bass	One rehearsal tape
Spring – September 1984 (known as Mantas)	Chuck Schuldiner – guitars, bass, vocals; Kam Lee – drums, vocals; Rick Rozz – guitars	Death by Metal (1984)
Band inactive September – October 1984
October 1984 – March 1985	Chuck Schuldiner – guitars, bass, vocals; Kam Lee – drums, vocals; Rick Rozz – guitars	Reign of Terror (1984); Infernal Death (1985)
March – April 1985	Chuck Schuldiner – guitars, bass, vocals; Kam Lee – drums, vocals	Rigor Mortis (1985)
May – summer 1985	Chuck Schuldiner – guitars, vocals; Kam Lee – drums, vocals; Scott Carlson – bass, vocals; Matt Olivo – guitars	Several rehearsal tapes
September – December 1985	Chuck Schuldiner – guitars, vocals; Erik Meade – bass; Eric Brecht – drums	Back from the Dead (1985)
Band inactive December 1985 – February 1986
March – late 1986	Chuck Schuldiner – guitars, bass, vocals; Chris Reifert – drums	One rehearsal tape (March 1986); Mutilation (April 1986)
1986	Chuck Schuldiner – guitars, bass, vocals; Chris Reifert – drums; Steve Di Giorgio - bass	Rehearsals and Scream Bloody Gore test pressing
May - November 1986	Chuck Schuldiner – guitars, bass, vocals; Chris Reifert – drums	Rehearsals (May 26, 1986); Rehearsals (May 28, 1986); Original Florida session (July 17, 1986); Rehearsals (August 20, 1986); Scream Bloody Gore (1987)
Early 1987	Chuck Schuldiner – guitars, vocals, bass; Chris Reifert – drums; John Hand – guitars	None
Late 1986 – May 1987	Chuck Schuldiner – guitars, vocals, bass; Chris Reifert – drums	None
June 1987 – May 1989	Chuck Schuldiner – guitars, vocals; Rick Rozz – guitars; Terry Butler – bass; Bill Andrews – drums	Rehearsals (September 23, 1987); Leprosy demos (November 1987); Rehearsals (December 5, 1987); Leprosy (1988) (does not feature Butler); Chicago, IL 01.21.1988 (2020); Tampa, FL 02.10.1989 (2020); New Rochelle, NY 12.03.1988 (2020)
June 1989	Chuck Schuldiner – guitars, vocals; Terry Butler – bass; Bill Andrews – drums; Paul Masvidal – guitars (touring)	None
July 1989	Chuck Schuldiner – guitars, vocals; Terry Butler – bass; Bill Andrews – drums; Mark Carter – guitars	None
Summer 1989 – April 1990	Chuck Schuldiner – guitars, vocals; Terry Butler – bass; Bill Andrews – drums; James Murphy – guitars	Rehearsals; Joke/Jam tracks; Studio instrumentals; New Rochelle, NY March 17, 1990; Spiritual Healing (1990)
April 1990	Chuck Schuldiner – guitars, vocals; Terry Butler – bass; Bill Andrews – drums; Paul Masvidal – guitars (touring)	None
August 1990	Chuck Schuldiner – guitars, vocals; Terry Butler – bass; Bill Andrews – drums	1990 rehearsal
August – October 1990	Chuck Schuldiner – guitars, vocals; Terry Butler – bass; Bill Andrews – drums; Albert Gonzales – guitars (touring)	Live 1990, 1991 Unknown (2020)
October 1990	Chuck Schuldiner – guitars, vocals; Terry Butler – bass; Bill Andrews – drums	Tijuana 10.06.1990 (2020)
October – December 1990 (temporary touring lineup)	Terry Butler – bass; Bill Andrews – drums; Louie Carrisalez – vocals (substitute); Walter Trachsler – guitars (substitute)	None
January-May 1991 (temporary recording lineup)	Chuck Schuldiner – guitars, vocals; Paul Masvidal – guitars; Steve Di Giorgio – bass; Sean Reinert – drums	Human demos; Rehearsals (January 1991); Drum and bass tracks; Basic instrumental studio tracks; Human (1991)
October 1991 – April 1992	Chuck Schuldiner – guitars, vocals; Paul Masvidal – guitars; Sean Reinert – drums; Scott Carino – bass (touring)	Live 1990, 1991 Unknown (2020); Belgium 12.23.1991 (2020)
Band inactive spring 1992
1992	Chuck Schuldiner – guitars	1992 riff tape
December 1992	Chuck Schuldiner – guitars; Gene Hoglan – drums	1992 demos
Early 1993 (temporary recording lineup)	Chuck Schuldiner – guitars, vocals; Steve Di Giorgio – bass; Gene Hoglan – drums; Andy LaRocque – guitars	Individual Thought Patterns (1993)
April – August 1993	Chuck Schuldiner – guitars, vocals; Steve Di Giorgio – bass; Gene Hoglan – drums; Ralph Santolla – guitars (touring)	Detroit, MI 1993 (2020)
September – October 1993	Chuck Schuldiner – guitars, vocals; Steve Di Giorgio – bass; Gene Hoglan – drums; Craig Locicero – guitars (touring)	None
Band inactive late 1993
January 1994	Chuck Schuldiner – guitars, vocals, bass, drum programming	January 1994 demo (1994)
March 1994	Chuck Schuldiner – guitar; Gene Hoglan – drum programming; Bobby Koelble – guitars; Steve Di Giorgio – bass	March 1994 demo (1994)
January – May 1995	Chuck Schuldiner – guitars, vocals; Gene Hoglan – drums; Bobby Koelble – guitars; Kelly Conlon – bass	Symbolic (1995)
June – October 1995	Chuck Schuldiner – guitars, vocals; Gene Hoglan – drums; Bobby Koelble – guitars; Brian Benson – bass	Montreal 06.22.1995 (2020); Showcase Theater, CA 07.14.1995 (2020)
Band inactive late 1995 – summer 1997
1997 – 1998	Chuck Schuldiner – guitars, vocals; Shannon Hamm – guitars; Steve Di Giorgio – bass; Richard Christy – drums	1997 demo (1997); 1998 demo (1998)
1998 – December 2001	Chuck Schuldiner – guitars, vocals; Shannon Hamm – guitars; Scott Clendenin – bass; Richard Christy – drums	The Sound of Perseverance (1998); Live in L.A. (Death & Raw) (2001); Live in Eindhoven (2001); Live in Cottbus '98 (2005); Vivus! (2012)
