= Death discography =

Cataloging of published recordings by Death

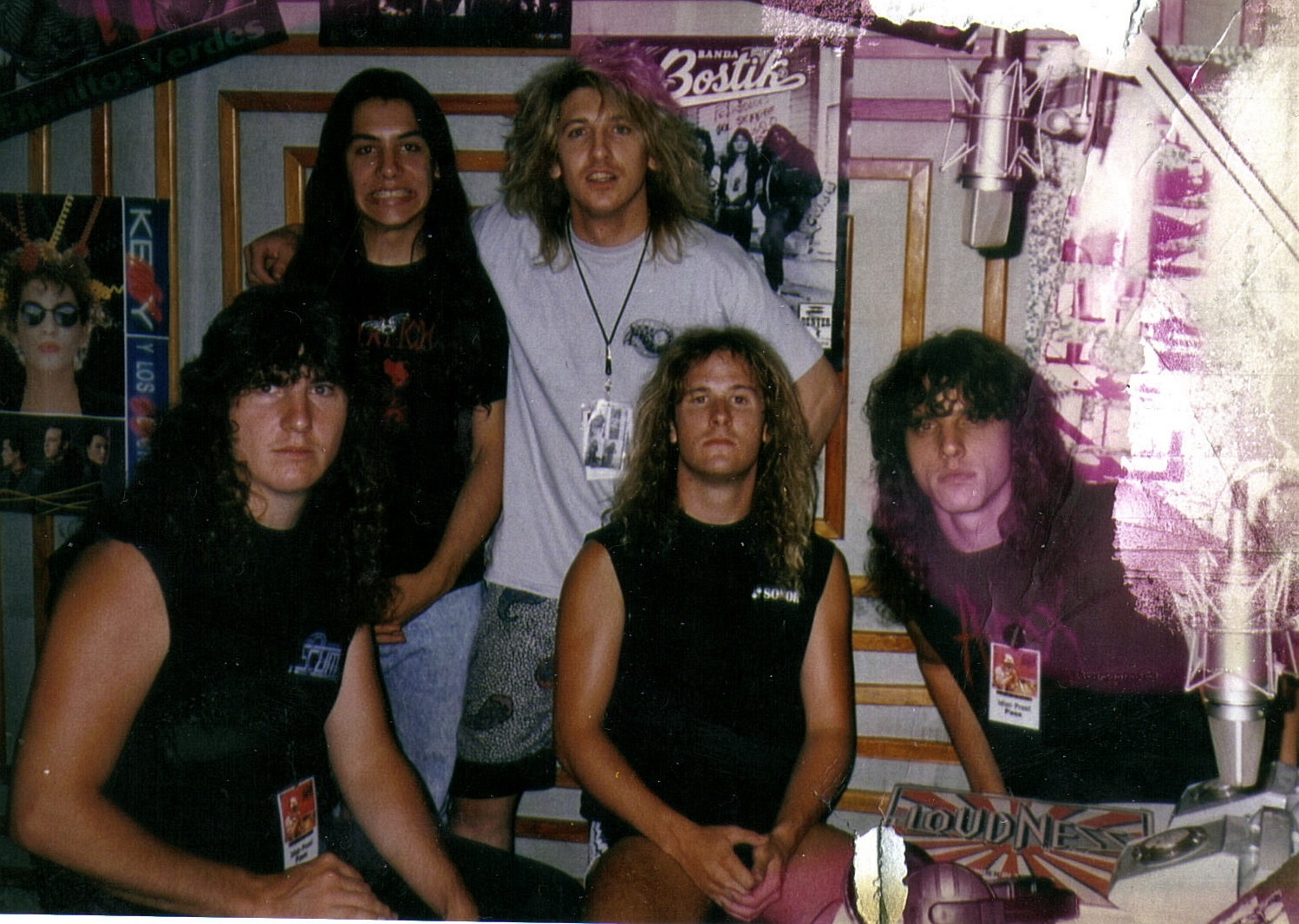
- Death in Mexico City, June 1989. From left to right: bassist Terry Butler, guitarist Paul Masvidal, manager Eric Greif, drummer Bill Andrews and guitarist/vocalist Chuck Schuldiner
- Studio albums: 7
- Live albums: 10
- Compilation albums: 1
- Singles: 3
- Video albums: 9
- Music videos: 2
- Demos: 7

The discography of Death consists of seven studio albums and four live albums. Death was an American death metal band formed in 1983. The band's founder, Chuck Schuldiner, is considered "a pioneering force in death metal". The band ceased to exist after Schuldiner died of brain cancer in 2001, though it remains an enduring death metal legacy.

As of 2003, Death have sold over 368,000 albums in the United States according to Nielsen SoundScan, making them the sixth best-selling death metal band in the country.

== Studio albums ==
Year	Album details	Peak chart positions					Sales
Year	Album details	US	US Heat.	AUT	GER	NLD	Sales
1987	Scream Bloody Gore: Released: May 25, 1987; Label: Combat (8146); Format: CD, CS, LP	174 (Note: Charted upon 2016 reissue)	—	—	—	—	
1988	Leprosy: Released: August 12, 1988; Label: Combat (8248); Format: CD, CS, LP	—	—	—	—	—	
1990	Spiritual Healing: Released: February 16, 1990; Label: Combat (2011); Format: CD, CS, LP	—	—	—	—	63	US: 50,000
1991	Human: Released: October 22, 1991; Label: Relativity (2036); Format: CD, LP	—	34	—	—	—	US: 95,000
1993	Individual Thought Patterns: Released: June 22, 1993; Label: Relativity (90792); Format: CD, CS, LP	—	30	—	—	86	US: 66,000
1995	Symbolic: Released: March 21, 1995; Label: Roadrunner (8957); Format: CD, LP	—	—	64	35	68	US: 50,000
1998	The Sound of Perseverance: Released: September 15, 1998; Label: Nuclear Blast (6337); Format: CD, DualDisc	—	47	35	60	93	US: 33,000
"—" denotes a release that did not chart.

== Live albums ==
Year	Album details
2001	Live in L.A. (Death & Raw): Released: October 16, 2001; Label: Nuclear Blast; Format: CD
2001	Live in Eindhoven: Released: October 30, 2001; Label: Nuclear Blast; Format: CD+DVD
2005	Live in Cottbus '98: Released: November 11, 2005; Label: Nuclear Blast; Format: DVD
2012	Vivus!: Released: February 28, 2012; Label: Relapse Records; Format: CD
2020	Non:Analog - On:Stage Series - Montreal Jun 22, 1995: Released: March 31, 2020; Label: Relapse Records; Format: Digital, LP, CD
2020	Non:Analog - On:Stage Series - Chicago, IL Jan 21, 1988: Released: April 14, 2020; Label: Relapse Records; Format: Digital, LP
2020	Non:Analog - On:Stage Series - Tijuana June 10, 1990: Released: April 20, 2020; Label: Relapse Records; Format: Digital, LP, CD
2020	Non:Analog - On:Stage Series - Showcase Theater, CA Jul 14, 1995: Released: May 11, 2020; Label: Relapse Records; Format: Digital, LP
2020	Non:Analog - On:Stage Series - 1990, 1991 Unknown: Released: May 27, 2020; Label: Relapse Records; Format: Digital, LP
2020	Non:Analog - On:Stage Series - Tampa, FL October 2, 1989: Released: June 8, 2020; Label: Relapse Records; Format: Digital, LP

== Compilation albums ==
Year	Album details
1992	Fate: The Best of Death: Released: 1992; Label: Relativity (1119); Format: CD, CS

== Demo albums ==
Prior to the release of the band's debut album in 1987, Death released many demos and rehearsal tapes. Below is a list of the band's official demos according to its website.

- Rehearsal tape -1- (rehearsal tape as Mantas, 1984)
- Rehearsal tape -2- (rehearsal tape as Mantas, 1984)
- Rehearsal tape -3- (rehearsal tape as Mantas, 1984)
- Death by Metal (demo as Mantas, 1984)
- Live tape -1- (live demo as Mantas, 1984)
- Live tape -2- (live demo, 1984)
- Live tape -3- (live demo, 1984)
- Live tape -4- (live demo, 1984)
- Live tape -5- (live demo, 1984)
- Reign of Terror (demo, 1984)
- Rehearsal tape -4- (rehearsal tape, 1985)
- Rehearsal tape -5- (rehearsal tape, 1985)
- Rehearsal tape -6- (rehearsal tape, 1985)
- Rehearsal tape -7- (rehearsal tape, 1985)
- Rehearsal tape -8- (rehearsal tape, 1985)
- Rehearsal tape -9- (rehearsal tape, 1985)
- Rehearsal tape -10- (rehearsal tape, 1985)
- Rehearsal tape -11- (rehearsal tape, 1985)
- Live tape -6- (live demo, 1985)
- Live tape -7- (live demo, 1985)
- Live tape -8- (live demo, 1985)
- Infernal Death (demo, 1985)
- Rigor Mortis (demo, 1985)
- Back From The Dead (demo, 1985)
- Rehearsal tape -12- (live demo 1986)
- Mutilation (demo, 1986)

== Singles ==
Year	Song	Album
1993	"The Philosopher"	Individual Thought Patterns
1995	"Empty Words"	Symbolic
1998	"Spirit Crusher"	The Sound of Perseverance

== Video albums ==
- Live in Combat Ultimate Revenge 2 (1988)
- Live in Houston (Bootleg, VHS, February 4, 1989)
- Lack of Comprehension (videoclip, 1991)
- The Philosopher (videoclip, 1993)
- Live in Florence (VHS, December 10, 1993)
- Live in Cottbus '98 (1998, Official Bootleg)
- Live in L.A. (Death & Raw) (Official Live, DVD/VHS, December 5, 1998)
- Live in Music Hall (1998, Virus Cable TV)
- Live in Eindhoven (Official Live, DVD, 2001, Nuclear Blast)

== Music videos ==
- "Lack of Comprehension" (1991)
- "The Philosopher" (1993)
