= Vivus! =

Live album by Death
- Released: February 28, 2012 (North America); March 2, 2012 (Benelux / Germany); March 5, 2012 (UK and rest of Europe)
- Recorded: December 5, 1998; May 13, 1998
- Genre: Death metal; technical death metal; melodic death metal
- Length: 128:07
- Label: Relapse
- Producer: Chuck Schuldiner

Death chronology
Live in Cottbus '98 (2005)	Vivus! (2012)

Vivus! is a compilation album released by American death metal band Death through Relapse Records which contains two previously released live albums: Live in L.A. (Death & Raw) and Live in Eindhoven. Both shows contained on Vivus! were recorded in 1998. Disc one features the band at Whisky a Go Go in Los Angeles, while disc two is a recording of the band on the festival stage at Dynamo Open Air.

== Track listing ==
All tracks are written by Chuck Schuldiner.

Disc 1 – Live in L.A. (Whisky a Go Go) – December 5, 1998
No.	Title	Length
1.	"The Philosopher"	3:40
2.	"Spirit Crusher"	6:26
3.	"Trapped in a Corner"	4:25
4.	"Scavenger of Human Sorrow"	6:39
5.	"Crystal Mountain"	4:47
6.	"Flesh and the Power It Holds"	8:01
7.	"Zero Tolerance"	5:00
8.	"Zombie Ritual"	4:41
9.	"Suicide Machine"	4:14
10.	"Together as One"	4:11
11.	"Empty Words"	7:03
12.	"Symbolic"	6:16
13.	"Pull the Plug"	6:22

Disc 2 – Live in Eindhoven (Dynamo Open Air) – May 31, 1998
No.	Title	Length
14.	"The Philosopher"	4:21
15.	"Trapped in a Corner"	4:39
16.	"Crystal Mountain"	5:01
17.	"Suicide Machine"	4:19
18.	"Together As One"	4:04
19.	"Zero Tolerance"	4:50
20.	"Lack of Comprehension"	3:46
21.	"Flesh and the Power It Holds"	8:40
22.	"Flattening Of Emotions"	4:26
23.	"Spirit Crusher"	6:55
24.	"Pull The Plug"	5:20
Total length:		128:07

== Personnel ==
- Chuck Schuldiner – vocals, guitar
- Richard Christy – drums
- Scott Clendenin – bass
- Shannon Hamm – guitar

== Charts ==
Chart performance for Vivus!
Chart (2024)	Peak position
Croatian International Albums (HDU)	9
