= Zero Tolerance (album) =

Compilation album by Chuck Schuldiner
- Released: 2004
- Genre: Death metal
- Length: 2:03:16
- Label: Candlelight Records

Professional ratings
Review scores
Source	Rating
Allmusic	2.5/5 stars

Zero Tolerance is a compilation album released by Karmageddon Media under the name Chuck Schuldiner. The album consists of demo tracks for the second Control Denied album and various Death demos and live recordings. This is Candlelight Records two CD version, but Karmageddon Media released these four Control Denied tracks and other Death material on one CD and the rest in a second disc.

== Track summary ==
Disc 1: Zero Tolerance

- Tracks 1–4 are working demo tracks of the new material for the second Control Denied album, tentatively titled When Man and Machine Collide
- Tracks 5–7 are from the demo Infernal Death (1985)
- Tracks 8–10 from the demo Mutilation (1986)

Disc 2: Zero Tolerance II

- Tracks 1–5 are from the demo Death by Metal (1984)
- Tracks 6–11 are from the demo Reign of Terror (1985)
- Tracks 12–19 were recorded live at the After Dark Club, Texas, in 1990.

== Track listing ==
Disc 1

1. "Track 1" – 8:57
2. "Track 2" – 6:57
3. "Track 3" – 7:33
4. "Track 4" – 7:09
5. "Infernal Death" – 3:01
6. "Baptized in Blood" – 4:47
7. "Archangel" – 3:21
8. "Land of No Return" – 3:09
9. "Zombie Ritual" – 4:49
10. "Mutilation" – 3:36

Disc 2

1. "Legion Of Doom" – 3:34
2. "Evil Dead" – 3:11
3. "Beyond the Unholy Grave" – 3:14
4. "Power of Darkness" – 2:29
5. "Death by Metal" – 2:16
6. "Corpse Grinder" – 2:55
7. "Summon to Die" – 2:26
8. "Zombie" – 3:03
9. "Witch of Hell" – 2:44
10. "Reign of Terror" – 2:15
11. "Slaughterhouse" – 2:25
12. "Living Monstrosity" – 4:10 (live)
13. "Pull the Plug" – 4:27 (live)
14. "Zombie Ritual" – 4:33 (live)
15. "Altering the Future" – 5:36 (live)
16. "Left to Die" – 4:38 (live)
17. "Spiritual Healing" – 7:45 (live)
18. "Defensive Personalities" – 4:46 (live)
19. "Mutilation" – 3:30 (live)
