= Crystal Mountain (song) =

Song by Death

from the album Symbolic
- Released: 1995
- Studio: Morrisound Recording
- Genre: Technical death metal melodic death metal
- Length: 5:07
- Label: Roadrunner Records
- Songwriter: Chuck Schuldiner
- Producer: Jim Morris

"Crystal Mountain" is a song by American death metal band Death that appeared on their sixth studio album Symbolic in 1995. Some consider it to be among the band's greatest songs and a fan favorite.

== Background and writing ==
Gene Hoglan, who played drums on the track, said that Death frontman Chuck Schuldiner wrote the track about his "judgemental" neighbors who had built a large fence between their residence and his own shortly after they had had moved in. According to Hoglan, the neighbors erroneously had the fence built on Schuldiner's property, allowing him to legally deface it with blasphemous language in an attempt to spite them.

== Composition and lyrics ==
Revolver described the song's lyrics "mystical", and stated its instrumentation contained Egyptian-style motifs. Loudwire listed the track as being among the "catchiest death metal songs ever," stating that "Chuck Schuldiner places every vocal line for maximum impact while the instrumentation underneath constantly tries to outdo itself in memorability." Additionally, the track contains some slower sections. Metal Injection called the track "crushingly groovy", and Consequence described the riffs as "constantly shifting". Gene Hoglan's drumming makes use of the double ride technique on the track.

== Cover versions ==
Californian progressive death metal act Hemotoxin covered the track in 2021, according to Decibel. The band stated that the track "was always one of those songs we would cover for fun, so after over a decade of performing the song live we decided to record our take on the track to express how influential Chuck’s music been to us."

In 2024, Metal Injection shared a solo piano rendition of the track that was posted to YouTube. In 2026, Alkaline Trio and Lady Gaga drummer Tosh Peterson drummed along to the track after his first listen in a video for Canadian music education company Drumeo. Hoglan approved of the rendition: "Mr. Tosh, boy, I tell you that was that was a inspired and refreshing take on a metal classic. I enjoyed that immensely. That was great. I hope you get to check out the original. Thank you Drumeo for reaching out. This was a real blast."

== Reception and legacy ==
Decibel emphasized the song's status as a "crucial" entry in Death's recorded catalog. MetalSucks named the song as "one of Death's most iconic tracks." Loudwire said the song contains "masterful use of chords" and cited it as containing some of the band's best guitar riffs. Revolver called the song a "melodic masterpiece". Online publication Gear Gods called the song a "progressive death metal classic".
