= Live in Cottbus '98 =

Video by Death
- Released: November 11, 2005
- Recorded: October 10, 1998, in Cottbus, Germany
- Genres: Death metal; technical death metal
- Length: 50:52
- Label: Nuclear Blast
- Producer: Chuck Schuldiner

Death chronology
Live in Eindhoven (2001)	Live in Cottbus '98 (2005)	Vivus! (2012)

Live in Cottbus '98 is a DVD by American band Death. It was recorded in Cottbus, Germany in 1998 and released on November 11, 2005, through Nuclear Blast. The DVD was released, along with the rerelease of The Sound of Perseverance, in order to commemorate the fourth anniversary of Chuck Schuldiner's death.

== Track listing ==
All tracks are written by Chuck Schuldiner.

No.	Title	Length
1.	"The Philosopher"
2.	"Spirit Crusher"
3.	"Trapped in a Corner"
4.	"Scavenger of Human Sorrow"
5.	"Together as One"
6.	"Flesh and the Power it Holds"
7.	"Drum Solo"
8.	"Flattening of Emotions"
9.	"Symbolic"
10.	"Pull the Plug"

== Personnel ==
- Chuck Schuldiner – vocals, guitar
- Richard Christy – drums
- Scott Clendenin – bass
- Shannon Hamm – guitar
