= Fate: The Best of Death =

Compilation album by Death
- Released: 1992
- Recorded: 1986–1991
- Genre: Death metal
- Length: 46:12
- Label: Relativity

Death chronology
Human (1991)	Fate: The Best of Death (1992)	Individual Thought Patterns (1993)

Professional ratings
Review scores
Source	Rating
AllMusic	3/5 stars

Fate: The Best of Death is a compilation album by Death. It contains songs collected from their first four albums, Scream Bloody Gore (1987), Leprosy (1988), Spiritual Healing (1990) and Human (1991).

The album was set to be re-released by Relapse Records in October 2023.

== Background ==
The first four Death albums were by Relativity Records, subsequently purchased by Sony Music Entertainment, and licensed by them to Century Media in Germany. The label used the impending lapse in the contract to release the album; other bands on the label also had compilation albums issued, including Exodus, Forbidden, Dark Angel and Possessed.

== Track listing ==
All tracks are written by Chuck Schuldiner, except where noted.

No.	Title	Writer(s)	Original album	Length
1.	"Zombie Ritual"		Scream Bloody Gore	4:32
2.	"Together as One"		Human	4:08
3.	"Open Casket"	Schuldiner, Rick Rozz	Leprosy	4:56
4.	"Spiritual Healing"		Spiritual Healing	7:45
5.	"Mutilation"		Scream Bloody Gore	3:28
6.	"Suicide Machine"		Human	4:22
7.	"Altering the Future"	Schuldiner, Terry Butler	Spiritual Healing	5:36
8.	"Baptized in Blood"		Scream Bloody Gore	4:30
9.	"Left to Die"	Schuldiner, Rozz	Leprosy	4:38
10.	"Pull the Plug"		Leprosy	4:27
Total length:				46:12

== Personnel ==
- Chuck Schuldiner : guitars and vocals (all tracks), bass (tracks 1, 3, 5, 8, 9 and 10)
- Paul Masvidal : guitars (tracks 2 and 6)
- Rick Rozz : guitars (tracks 3, 9 and 10)
- James Murphy : guitars (tracks 4 and 7)
- Steve Di Giorgio : bass (tracks 2 and 6)
- Terry Butler : bass (tracks 4 and 7)
- Chris Reifert : drums (tracks 1, 5 and 8)
- Sean Reinert : drums (tracks 2 and 6)
- Bill Andrews : drums (tracks 3, 4, 7, 9 and 10)
