= Spirit Crusher =

Song by Death

from the album The Sound of Perseverance
- Genre: Progressive death metal
- Length: 6:47
- Label: Nuclear Blast
- Songwriter: Chuck Schuldiner

"Spirit Crusher" is a song by the American death metal band Death. It appeared on the band's final studio album The Sound of Perseverance. It is considered by some to be among the band's greatest songs.

== Composition and style ==
Loudwire stated that the guitar work during the track's refrain "literally makes the listener feel like [they are] being crushed." The guitar work has drawn comparisons to power metal. Metal Forces described the track as sounding like "a more progressive and scything Judas Priest." A staff writer wrote: "For the most part this is classic metal, delivered at a relatively slow pace but always remaining elusive with those juddering drums." AllMusic said the track contained "ungodly solos and leads" as well as "one of the most terrifying, blood-curdling choruses ever." Chronicles of Chaos described the chorus as "slow [and] simple."

== Cover versions ==
The song has been reimagined and performed by symphonic orchestras. The song was used as a live encore by Death to All, a touring band formed in tribute to late Death frontman Chuck Schuldiner.
