= Kelly Conlon =

American musician

Kelly Conlon (born March 20, 1969) is an American bass guitarist. He has been a hired musician with Death and Monstrosity and performed with Agent Steel.

== Career ==
Conlon was part of the Florida underground metal scene until 1994 when Orlando-based Chuck Schuldiner hired him to play with the American death metal band Death. He recorded the album Symbolic and went on the subsequent European "Full of Hate Festivals" tour, though he was replaced by Brian Benson, who played the North American tour. According to Schuldiner, he, Gene Hoglan and Bobby Koelble collectively decided to kick Conlon out.

Conlon joined Monstrosity, another Florida death metal band, in 1995 and played on the albums Millennium (1996) and In Dark Purity (1999). Conlon also played bass in extreme metal band Pessimist.

It was announced in August 2011 at Blabbermouth.net that Conlon was recruited to join "Arizona-based death/thrash metallers Sargon", which went on an undefined hiatus.

Conlon played on Azure Emote's "The Gravity Of Impermanence" in 2013.

Conlon joined Agent Steel in July 2023. He had been replaced by founding member George Robb by December 2024.
