= Control Denied =

American progressive metal band

- Origin: Florida, United States
- Genre: Progressive metal
- Years active: 1995–1997; 1999–2001
- Labels: Nuclear Blast, Hammerheart, Relapse

Control Denied was a progressive metal band formed by death metal musician and Death co-founder Chuck Schuldiner.

== History ==
=== Background ===
Schuldiner, in a 1993 Terrorizer interview with Borivoj Krgin, mentioned that after he returned from Europe following the 1992 tour, he had entertained the possibility of ending Death and forming a more melodic band, with a different singer, similar to Sortilege's Christian Augustin. Schuldiner felt that he was limited vocally, saying that it was "something that can't be done" with Death and that forming another band would allow him to do "things that ... can't be totally expressed through this band". He ultimately he decided that he did not want to "get off track" with Death and instead put the idea "on hold". Schuldiner mentioned the general idea of teaming up with a Rob Halford-esque singer in a September 1993 interview with Guitar School. He would discuss the idea further in multiple 1995 interviews, including Guitar World, the Italian magazine Metal Shock, and the Dutch magazine Watt, mentioning Ronnie James Dio as another example of the type of singer he would like to partner with. Death drummer Gene Hoglan has stated that after the Symbolic tour, Schuldiner broke up Death as he was unhappy with Roadrunner Records, which had released the album.

=== Formation ===
B.C Richards joined the band in 1995 as vocalist, though he temporarily left the same year to focus on his band, Wicked Ways.

Drummer Chris Williams joined around this time and recruited Shannon Hamm on guitar and Scott Clendenin on bass. Schuldiner praised Williams' drumming in the Death fan newsletter, The Metal Crusade, highlighting his "high energy progressive drumming" and "insane double bass techniques." Schuldiner attempted to get Andy LaRocque as a lead guitarist, but the lack of a label's financial backing hindered it. He asked Death guitarist Bobby Koelble to join, though he declined.

Schuldiner had worked on Control Denied riffs by the time Death was touring in Japan for the Symbolic album, which took place in September 1995.

=== Early years ===
By 1996, Richards had rejoined. Richards had left the band again the following year. Clendenin was replaced by Brian Benson by the spring of 1997; he had played in Death on their Symbolic tours. The name of the album at the time was The Moment of Clarity; other tracks from the album included What If and Cut Down to Size. Psycho Scream guitarist Jim Dofka had sent Schuldiner demo material and was interested in joining Control Denied alongside his bandmate, singer Tim Aymar. However, Schuldiner had already selected Hamm as the guitarist. After a brief audition, and demo, (which included the tracks What If, Believe and Cut Down), Aymar was chosen as the new singer, while Rob Halford of Judas Priest was also considered for the position. Earlier, Warrel Dane of Nevermore was almost selected as the singer, though the scheduling did not work out as Dane was dedicated to Nevermore and didn't have the time. Williams left the band as he couldn't "hang around waiting" any longer and went on to form Beyond Unknown.

=== The Fragile Art of Existence ===
Schuldiner signed with the record label Nuclear Blast in 1997, though the label required that another Death album be released before a Control Denied album could be issued. This led to the release of Death's The Sound of Perseverance in 1998. Schuldiner played with Hamm and Clendenin on the album, in addition to drummer Richard Christy.

It was announced in early April 1999 that the recording of the debut album was completed by the TSOP lineup (with the addition of Aymar). However, Schuldiner let Clendenin go in April and brought on DiGiorgio. The band's debut album, The Fragile Art of Existence, was released in Europe in November 1999. The Fragile Art of Existence was reissued in October 2010 by Relapse Records in a 2-disc standard format, with one hour of bonus material, and a 3-disc deluxe version, with two hours of bonus material.

=== When Man and Machine Collide ===
Schuldiner finished writing the second Control Denied album in March 2000 and signed with Hammerheart Records in December 2000.

The second album (which began to be recorded at Morrisound with Jim Morris under the initial title of When Hate Strikes Down, but which was later tentatively titled When Man and Machine Collide), was partly recorded in November 2000. According to an interview with Hamm originally done in the Tampa Metal Music Examiner, Schuldiner and Christy had completed their tracks, while Hamm recorded three of his tracks before the funds were diverted to pay for Schuldiner's medical bills. The death of Schuldiner in 2001 put the recordings on hold. Remaining band members had expressed a wish to complete and release the material. However, there existed a longstanding legal dispute over the rights of the material with Hammerheart Records (Note: Hammerheart Records changed its name to Karmageddon Media in 2003, but changed it back in 2006.), further postponing the completion and release of the album.

Schuldiner's mother, Jane, affirmed in January 2003 that the album would be released. Hammerheart indicated in a 2003 press release that it would release the "incomplete recordings", to which Schuldiner responded that it would be "sacrilege." Schuldiner initially announced in March 2004 that they would be uploaded and made available for free download. The following month, she indicated that rather than release the rehearsal tracks, the entire completed album should be released instead. Part of these incomplete recordings were released without authorization on the Zero Tolerance album, which was announced as the title by Karmageddon Media in March 2004. Schuldiner estate lawyer and Death manager Eric Greif settled all matters with the label by 2009, allowing for the possibility of completing the album.

On December 4, 2010, Aymar released a statement saying that plans were being made to record and release the album, stating that Jim Morris of Morrisound Studios (with whom Chuck Schuldiner recorded several albums during his career) had been in contact with Greif to begin planning and booking studio time to record the remaining parts of When Man and Machine Collide. Plans were cut short by a break-in at Morrisound in the spring of 2011 that saw much of their equipment stolen, pushing back the completion of the album. An exploratory meeting between producer Jim Morris and guitarist Shannon Hamm was held in December 2012. Greif stated in October 2016 that the recordings would not be completed. The progressive metal band Black Water Sunset released a tribute album featuring re-recorded versions of the four leaked tracks in May 2024, marking what would have been Schuldiner's birthday. Di Giorgio stated in a June 2025 interview that the band is still hoping to complete the album, though Aymar's death in 2023 was a setback.

== Discography ==
- 1996 demo (1996)
- 1997 demo (1997)
- 1999 demo (1999)
- The Fragile Art of Existence (1999)
- Unreleased Themes from Control Denied (bootleg) (2004)
- The Fragile Art of Existence (reissue, two formats) (2010)

== Members ==
Final lineup

- Chuck Schuldiner – guitars (1995–1997; 1999–2001), vocals (1996–1997, 1999); died 2001
- Steve Di Giorgio – bass (1999–2001)
- Shannon Hamm – guitars (1995–1997; 1999–2001)
- Tim Aymar – vocals (1997–1999; 1999–2001); died 2023
- Richard Christy – drums (1999–2001)

Former members

- B.C. Richards – vocals (1995), 1996
- Brian Benson - bass (1997)
- Chris Williams – drums (1995–1997); died 2000
- Scott Clendenin – bass (1995–1997, 1999); died 2015

== Line-ups ==
| Period | Members | Studio releases |
|---|---|---|
| 1995 | B.C. Richards – vocals; Chuck Schuldiner - guitar | None |
| ca. 1995 | Chuck Schuldiner - guitar, vocals; Chris Williams - drums | None |
| ca. 1995 | Chuck Schuldiner - guitar, vocals; Chris Williams - drums; Shannon Hamm - guitars | None |
| 1995-1996 | Chuck Schuldiner - guitar, vocals; Scott Clendenin - bass; Chris Williams - drums; Shannon Hamm - guitars | 1996 demo |
| ca. April 1996 | Chuck Schuldiner - guitars; B.C. Richards - vocals | None |
| Spring 1997 | Chuck Schuldiner - guitar; Brian Benson - bass; Chris Williams - drums; Shannon Hamm - guitars | None |
| 1997 | Chuck Schuldiner - guitar; Tim Aymar – vocals; Scott Clendenin - bass; Chris Williams - drums; Shannon Hamm - guitars | 1997 demo |
Inactive from 1998 – 1999
| ?-April 1999 | Chuck Schuldiner – guitar, vocals; Scott Clendenin - bass; Tim Aymar – vocals; Richard Christy – drums; Shannon Hamm – guitar | |
| April 1999 – 2001 | Chuck Schuldiner – guitar, vocals; Steve Di Giorgio - bass; Tim Aymar – vocals; Richard Christy – drums; Shannon Hamm – guitar | 1999 demo The Fragile Art of Existence (1999) |
