= The Fragile Art of Existence =

Studio album by Control Denied
- Released: November 30, 1999
- Recorded: March 1999-April 1999 circa April-June 1999 (bass rerecording)
- Studio: Morrisound Recording
- Genres: Progressive metal; power metal
- Length: 50:46
- Labels: Nuclear Blast; Relapse Records (2010 reissue)
- Producers: Jim Morris, Chuck Schuldiner

Control Denied chronology
1999 demo (1999)	The Fragile Art of Existence (1999)

The Fragile Art of Existence is the only studio album by Control Denied, a progressive metal band founded by Chuck Schuldiner.

This was also Chuck Schuldiner's final studio album before he died of brain cancer on December 13, 2001.

== Background and recording ==
The lineup that recorded Death's album The Sound of Perseverance (TSOP), in addition to singer Tim Aymar, was originally intended to release the Control Denied album (and had completed the recording process in April 1999), though bassist Scott Clendenin was let go that same month. Schuldiner contacted frequent Death collaborator and bass player Steve Di Giorgio and requested that he record new basslines to replace the ones recorded by Clendenin. In some instances, Di Giorgio kept the bass lines recorded by Clendenin; he viewed it as a way to "return the favor", as Clendenin kept some of the bass lines that Di Giorgio played on the demos for TSOP. Schuldiner remarked in a January 2000 Metal Maniacs interview that Clendenin "just didn't seem into it, I don't know if it was the material or what, but he didn't seem happy with what was going on, so we had to just let him go."

== Release history ==
The album was initially expected to be released in September 1999. It was released worldwide on Nuclear Blast America on November 30, 1999.

Metal Mind Productions reissued the album on April 15, 2008 (February 11, 2008 in Europe). The release was digitally remastered and limited to 2,000 copies. The album was again re-released in 2010 by Relapse Records, available in two-disc and three-disc editions. The three-disc edition was limited to 1,000 copies.

A vinyl reissue was scheduled to be released in June 2018 by Relapse Records.

== Music and lyrics ==
The album's musical style retains the "progressive musical prowess" of Death's later output. Tim Aymar's vocals have been likened to those of Bruce Dickinson of Iron Maiden and Rob Halford of Judas Priest. The album's overall style has been categorized as hybrid of power metal and progressive metal, and has been characterized as "[tearing] down the conventional walls" of the former. The album's guitar solos have been described as "free jazz meets metal guitar God."

== Critical reception ==
Professional ratings
Review scores
Source	Rating
About.com	4/5 stars
AllMusic	3/5 stars
Brave Words & Bloody Knuckles	9/10
Chronicles of Chaos	8/10
Collector's Guide to Heavy Metal	7/10

Jason Hundey of AllMusic called the album "powerful, brilliant, and subversively catchy" and said that it was Steve Di Giorgio's "finest hour behind the bass."

== Track listing ==
All songs written by Chuck Schuldiner.

Original release
No.	Title	Length
1.	"Consumed"	7:24
2.	"Breaking the Broken"	5:41
3.	"Expect the Unexpected"	7:17
4.	"What If...?"	4:29
5.	"When the Link Becomes Missing"	5:17
6.	"Believe"	6:10
7.	"Cut Down"	4:50
8.	"The Fragile Art of Existence"	9:38
Total length:		50:46

2010 Relapse reissue (disc 2)
No.	Title	Length
1.	"Consumed (1999 Demo)"	6:40
2.	"When the Link Becomes Missing (1999 Demo)"	5:20
3.	"The Fragile Art of Existence (1999 Demo)"	9:30
4.	"Breaking the Broken (1999 Demo)"	5:44
5.	"Breaking the Broken (1999 Demo) w/ Chuck Schuldiner on Vocals"	5:45
6.	"Believe (1997 Demo)"	6:16
7.	"What If...? (1997 Demo)"	4:27
8.	"Cut Down (1997 Demo)"	5:01
9.	"Tune of Evil (Comedy Demo)"	3:15
Total length:		51:58

2010 Relapse reissue (disc 3)
No.	Title	Length
1.	"What If...? (1996 Demo)"	4:25
2.	"Cut Down (1996 Demo)"	4:54
3.	"Expect the Unexpected (1996 Demo)"	6:37
4.	"Believe (1996 Demo)"	6:08
5.	"The Fragile Art of Existence (1996 Demo)"	8:25
6.	"What If...? (1996 Demo)"	4:23
7.	"Expect the Unexpected (1996 Demo) w/ Chuck Schuldiner on Vocals"	6:51
8.	"What If...? (1996 Demo) w/ Chuck Schuldiner on Vocals"	4:25
9.	"Cut Down (1996 Demo) w/ Chuck Schuldiner on Vocals"	4:53
Total length:		50:58

== Personnel ==
Control Denied

- Tim Aymar – vocals on 1997 demos and album
- Chuck Schuldiner – guitars, vocals on 1996 and 1999 demos, production
- Shannon Hamm – guitars
- Steve Di Giorgio – bass
- Richard Christy – drums on 1999 demos and album
- Scott Clendenin – bass on 1996 and 1997 demos
- Chris Williams – drums on 1996 and 1997 demos

Technical personnel

- Jim Morris - production, engineering, mixing & mastering
