= Scott Clendenin =

- Born: January 17, 1968
- Origin: Titusville, Florida, U.S.
- Died: March 24, 2015 (aged 47)
- Genres: Death metal; technical death metal; melodic death metal; progressive metal
- Occupation: Musician
- Instrument: Bass
- Years active: 1996–2001; 2011–2013
- Label: Nuclear Blast
- Formerly of: Death; Control Denied; Death To All; Talonzfury; Symbolic

Scott Clendenin (January 17, 1968 – March 24, 2015) was an American musician most notable for his time spent in the bands Death and Control Denied, both of which were formed by Chuck Schuldiner. Following Schuldiner's passing, both Death and Control Denied disbanded. In 2012, he played for Death to All, former members of Death paying tribute to Schuldiner, as well as members of Bereft and Obscura. Clendenin died on March 24, 2015, with Death bandmate Richard Christy and Death's former manager Eric Greif expressing their shock and sympathy.

== Biography ==
Scott Clendenin was born on January 17, 1968. Clendenin began his musical career in various bands and would go on to form the band Talonzfury, alongside Chris Williams on drums and Paul Payne on guitars. The three recorded an album together under the name and attempted to hire Shannon Hamm, which did not work out. Shortly after that, Williams met Chuck Schuldiner at a party and played him a copy of the Talonzfury album, which led to Schuldiner hiring him, Hamm, and Clendenin as an early Control Denied lineup. Payne unsuccessfully tried out as the singer. However, Williams eventually left the band.

Clendenin played bass on a tribute track to Randy Rhoads called Hardly A Day Goes By that also featured Williams on drums, with Craig Sease on vocals and Schuldiner on lead guitar.

At this time, Death's record label was reaching out to Schuldiner to tell him to work on another album for Death in order to release the Control Denied album. The band released the seventh Death album, titled The Sound of Perseverance, in 1998. The following winter/spring, Clendenin recorded bass tracks for the Control Denied album The Fragile Art of Existence but was let go and replaced by former Death bassist Steve Di Giorgio.

Clendenin appeared on live Death DVDs titled Live in L.A. (Death & Raw), as well as Live in Eindhoven, which were released in 2001. In 2001, Schuldiner died at the age of 34, which resulted in the dissolution of both bands.

In 2007, Clendenin played in a tribute show alongside Symbolic, a Death tribute band, at Theatre Imperial in Quebec, Canada for the anniversary of Schuldiner's death. Former Death guitarist Bobby Koelble also played at the show. The show was filmed and was set to be released in December 2010.

Clendenin was part of a band named Centralia.

In 2012, it was announced that Clendenin would be on the Death to All tour, which featured himself and Di Giorgio on bass, Hamm, Paul Masvidal, and Bobby Koelble on guitars, and Sean Reinert and Gene Hoglan on drums. Clendenin would play in both the 2012 and 2013 tours with the band. Clendenin died on March 24, 2015, due to undisclosed reasons. Richard Christy and Death's former manager Eric Greif eulogized him online.

== Bands ==
Former

- Talonzfury
- Control Denied (1995–1997; 1999)
- Death (1997–2001)
- Centralia
- Death To All (2012–2013)

== Discography ==
Death

- The Sound of Perseverance (1998)
- Live in L.A. (Death & Raw) (2001)
- Live in Eindhoven (2002)
- Vivus! (2012)

Control Denied

- Demo (1996)
- A Moment of Clarity (1997)
- The Fragile Art of Existence (1999; writing only)

Symbolic

- The Ultimate Death Tribute (2010, tracks 4–6, 15–16, 21)
