= Live in L.A. (Death & Raw) =

Live album by Death
- Released: October 16, 2001
- Recorded: December 5, 1998
- Venue: Whisky a Go Go in Los Angeles
- Genres: Death metal; technical death metal
- Length: 71:57
- Label: Nuclear Blast
- Producer: Chuck Schuldiner

Death chronology
The Sound of Perseverance (1998)	Live in L.A. (Death & Raw) (2001)	Live in Eindhoven (2001)

Professional ratings
Review scores
Source	Rating
AllMusic	3/5 stars
Chronicles of Chaos	10/10
Metal Hammer	7/10

Live in L.A. (Death & Raw) is a live album released by Death. It was recorded on December 5, 1998, in Los Angeles at the Whisky a Go Go and released on October 16, 2001, through Nuclear Blast. The album was also released in DVD format.

This was one of two Death albums originally released to raise money for Chuck Schuldiner's cancer treatment.

== Track listing ==
All tracks are written by Chuck Schuldiner.

No.	Title	Length
1.	"Intro / The Philosopher"	3:52
2.	"Spirit Crusher"	6:26
3.	"Trapped in a Corner"	4:25
4.	"Scavenger of Human Sorrow"	6:39
5.	"Crystal Mountain"	4:47
6.	"Flesh and the Power It Holds"	8:01
7.	"Zero Tolerance"	5:00
8.	"Zombie Ritual"	4:41
9.	"Suicide Machine"	4:14
10.	"Together as One"	4:11
11.	"Empty Words"	7:03
12.	"Symbolic"	6:16
13.	"Pull the Plug (With Charlie's Angels theme intro)"	6:22
Total length:		71:57

== Personnel ==
- Chuck Schuldiner – vocals, guitar
- Richard Christy – drums
- Scott Clendenin – bass
- Shannon Hamm – guitar
