= The Sound of Perseverance =

- Original cover art by Travis Smith

Studio album by Death
- Released: August 31, 1998
- Studios: Morrisound Recording, Tampa, Florida
- Genres: Progressive death metal; melodic death metal
- Length: 56:17
- Label: Nuclear Blast
- Producers: Jim Morris, Chuck Schuldiner

Death chronology
Symbolic (1995)	The Sound of Perseverance (1998)	Live in L.A. (Death & Raw) (2001)

Singles from The Sound of Perseverance
- 1. "Spirit Crusher" Released: 1998

Death studio album chronology
Symbolic (1995)	The Sound of Perseverance (1998)

Redone cover art from the 2011 reissue

The Sound of Perseverance is the seventh and final studio album by American death metal band Death, released on August 31, 1998, by Nuclear Blast. The album featured guitarist Shannon Hamm, drummer Richard Christy, and bassist Scott Clendenin for the first and only time. It was also Death's final studio album, as Chuck Schuldiner died due to brain cancer-related issues in 2001, and Death subsequently disbanded. It is considered to be one of the most accomplished releases in Death's discography, and has been called one of the greatest heavy metal albums of all time by AllMusic reviewer Jason Hundey.

== Background and recording ==
Prior to the recording of the album, Chuck Schuldiner had broken up the band due to tension with their previous label, Roadrunner Records and focused on his band Control Denied. He signed to Nuclear Blast, who mandated that Death release another album before the label would issue a Control Denied album. Schuldiner stated in a 1998 interview that frequent Death bassist Steve Di Giorgio, who had played on some of the album's demos, was too busy to play on the album, so Scott Clendenin, with whom Schuldiner had been playing in Control Denied, replaced him. Shannon Hamm, who also played in Control Denied, and new addition Richard Christy joined as well. The album was recorded at Morrisound Recording over a three-week period and had already been demoed twice in Schuldiner's home studio.

The instrumental "Voice of the Soul" was written during the Symbolic sessions, while "The Moment of Clarity" was anticipated to be the title track on the first Control Denied album. Other tracks from the album would have included "What If" and "Cut Down to Size", which were all worked on in 1997. Though Schuldiner stated in an interview with Metal Maniacs the following year that none of his compositions for Control Denied had been used to fill space for a Death album, Tim Aymar confirmed in 2010 that several Control Denied songs were reimagined as Death songs and released on The Sound of Perseverance. Hamm stated during the Death by Metal documentary that record labels were initially unwilling to take a chance on Control Denied, as it was not a proven band. He also mentioned that the Control Denied songs that were reused as Death songs included Bite the Pain, Spirit Crusher, Story to Tell, Voice of the Soul and A Moment of Clarity.

The band's cover of the Judas Priest song "Painkiller" was intended as a bonus track for Japan, but Nuclear Blast recommended that it be included on all releases.

== Music ==
The Sound of Perseverance has been described as "[appearing] as an eerie specter that copiously reminds us of how our subconscious strangely discerns more than one can even imagine about oneself." The material on the album has been called "ambitious" and "mind-[bendingly]" complex. It is considered to be the most experimental and "expansive" Death release by critics and journalists, containing lengthier tracks and increasingly sophisticated songwriting. According to Metal Hammer, the album is "full of awkward time changes and weird keys." Music journalist T Coles referred to the album as "death metal in an advanced form." The album has been characterized as combining the "best aspects" of the band's three previous albums, and "[taking] them one step further." The tracks have been described as "more aggressive, more progressive, and certainly more melodic." The album has been characterized by "sheer ferocity" and "raw emotion". The music on The Sound of Perseverance has drawn comparisons to Atheist, Dream Theater, Meshuggah and Cynic. Critics have made note of elements of progressive music and jazz fusion present in the album's rhythm section. Christy's drumming on the album has been described as "octopus-like". Schuldiner's vocals on the album have been described as "falsetto death metal shrieks". AllMusic described his vocals on the album as his "eeriest performance ever." His scream in the intro of the "Painkiller" cover has been likened to power metal. The band recorded using B.C. Rich Stealth guitars, achieving a "razor-like" guitar tone. Jason Hundey of AllMusic said the album's third track, "Spirit Crusher," contains "one of the most terrifying, blood-curdling choruses ever."

== Release ==
The album was released on August 31, 1998. The band embarked on a tour which would later provide the material for several live albums, including Live in L.A. and Live in Eindhoven. Afterwards, Schuldiner put aside Death and continued work on Control Denied's first album The Fragile Art of Existence.

Nuclear Blast released a deluxe edition in December 2005. It contains the original album as well as the DVD Live in Cottbus '98 and press pictures. It was also released as a DualDisc. Relapse Records released a second deluxe edition on February 15, 2011. The album was remastered and reissued in deluxe 2-CD and 3-CD formats, with the additional CDs containing unreleased demo material and a revised cover by original cover artist Travis Smith.

A vinyl reissue was scheduled to be released in November 2016 by Relapse Records.

== Reception and legacy ==
Professional ratings
Review scores
Source	Rating
About.com	5/5 stars
AllMusic	4.5/5 stars
Chronicles of Chaos	9/10
Collector's Guide to Heavy Metal	9/10
Kerrang!	3/5 stars
Metal Forces	10/10

The Sound of Perseverance has received critical acclaim and is considered by fans and critics alike as one of Death's greatest albums. Jason Hundey of AllMusic described it as "a truly glorious metal release, certainly Death's finest hour, and easily one of the top metal albums of all time". Chronicles of Chaos reviewer Paul Schwarz said the album "excels in all the right places. Great thrashings, technical solos, memorable choruses and clear vocals are the order of the day". Schwarz also stated that while he was impressed with Death's cover of "Painkiller" by Judas Priest, he questioned its use as the closing track on the album.

Music journalist T Coles said The Sound of Perseverance is "the final divide between death metal's older style and the sounds yet to come."

Metal Hammer named The Sound of Perseverance as one of the greatest metal releases of the 1990s, saying it "inspired a generation of slightly off-kilter metal musicians who didn't quite fit in to go forth and create with scarce regard for the boundaries of genre or the limitations of a prescribed sound."

In 2024, Metal Injection included the album in its list of "10 Extremely Underrated Death Metal Albums". Staff writer Graham Hartmann said: "I told you once, but I will say it again — you're a butthole if you hate on this album. It’s a god damn masterpiece and will always be too underrated."

The band Blackwater Sunset is working on a "full-length tribute album" that will feature Chris Poland on lead guitar, Marco Minnemann on drums, and Rich Gray of Annihilator on fretless bass, with mixing by Jim Morris.

== Track listing ==
All tracks are written by Chuck Schuldiner, except "Painkiller" written by Rob Halford, K. K. Downing and Glenn Tipton.

No.	Title	Length
1.	"Scavenger of Human Sorrow"	6:56
2.	"Bite the Pain"	4:29
3.	"Spirit Crusher"	6:47
4.	"Story to Tell"	6:34
5.	"Flesh and the Power It Holds"	8:26
6.	"Voice of the Soul" (instrumental)	3:43
7.	"To Forgive Is to Suffer"	5:55
8.	"A Moment of Clarity"	7:25
9.	"Painkiller" (Judas Priest cover)	6:02
Total length:		56:17

2011 remastered version (bonus disc 1)
No.	Title	Length
1.	"Spirit Crusher" (from 1998 demos, no bass (instrumental))	6:55
2.	"Flesh and the Power It Holds" (from 1998 demos, no bass (instrumental))	8:22
3.	"Voice of the Soul" (from 1998 demos, no bass (instrumental))	3:30
4.	"Bite the Pain" (from 1998 demos)	4:28
5.	"A Moment of Clarity" (from 1998 demos)	6:38
6.	"Story to Tell" (from 1998 demos)	6:40
7.	"Scavenger of Human Sorrow" (from 1998 demos)	6:49
8.	"Bite the Pain" (from 1997 demos)	4:31
9.	"Story to Tell" (from 1997 demos)	6:37
10.	"A Moment of Clarity" (from 1997 demos)	6:34
Total length:		61:02

2011 remastered version (bonus disc 2)
No.	Title	Length
1.	"Bite the Pain" (from 1996 demos, Chuck Schuldiner on vocals)	4:19
2.	"Story to Tell" (from 1996 demos, Chuck Schuldiner on vocals)	6:19
3.	"A Moment of Clarity" (from 1996 demos, Chuck Schuldiner on vocals, clean backing vocals)	6:17
4.	"Bite the Pain" (from 1996 demos, Paul Payne on vocals)	4:20
5.	"A Moment of Clarity" (from 1996 demos, Paul Payne on vocals)	6:17
6.	"A Moment of Clarity" (from 1996 demos, Chuck Schuldiner on vocals, clean vocals)	6:17
7.	"Story to Tell" (from 1996 demos, Chuck Schuldiner on vocals, clean vocals)	6:24
8.	"Bite the Pain" (from 1996 demos, Shannon Hamm on vocals)	4:14
9.	"A Moment of Clarity" (from 1996 demos, instrumental)	5:32
10.	"Bite the Pain" (from 1996 demos, instrumental)	4:14
11.	"Story to Tell" (from 1996 demos, instrumental)	6:13
12.	"Voice of the Soul" (from 1996 demos, instrumental)	3:29
13.	"A Moment of Clarity" (from 1996 demos, instrumental)	6:12
Total length:		70:07

== Personnel ==
Death

- Chuck Schuldiner – vocals, guitars, arrangements, production
- Shannon Hamm – guitars, arrangements, vocals on 1996 demo
- Scott Clendenin – bass
- Richard Christy – drums
- Paul Payne – vocals on 1996 demo
- Steve Di Giorgio – bass on 1997 and 1998 demos
- Chris Williams – drums on 1996 demo, and 1997 demo of Bite the Pain

Technical personnel

- Jim Morris - production, engineering, mixing, mastering
- Travis Smith - artwork
- Jay Speis - art direction, graphic design
- Eric Greif - legal & IP management
- Alex McKnight - photography

== Charts ==
Chart	Peak position
Austrian Albums (Ö3 Austria)	35
Dutch Albums (Album Top 100)	93
German Albums (Offizielle Top 100)	60
