= Reign of Terror (demo) =

Demo album by Death
- Released: October 1984
- Genre: Death metal
- Length: 13:39
- Label: Independent

Death chronology
Death by Metal (1984)	Reign of Terror (1984)	Live 12/30/84 (1985)

Reign of Terror is a demo album by American death metal band Death, released in October 1984. An interview of the band's lead vocalist and guitarist Chuck Schuldiner was later re-released in 1985 as “Reign of Terror II” which includes a set from October 1984.

Along with Death's demo Infernal Death, Reign of Terror "influenced the Death metal scene tremendously", as "their low and guttural nature would become the staple of the genre". Author Ian Christe, in his book Sound of the Beast: The Complete Headbanging History of Heavy Metal, noted that Death's demos "became as heavily shared by tape traders as any well-established act in metal".

== Track listing ==
No.	Title	Length
1.	"Corpse Grinder"	3:04
2.	"Summoned to Die"	2:37
3.	"Witch of Hell"	2:56
4.	"Reign of Terror"	2:25
5.	"Slaughterhouse"	2:37
Total length:		13:39

The fan club version of the demo also features a song titled "Zombie Attack" between "Summoned to Die" and "Witch of Hell".

== Personnel ==
- Chuck Schuldiner – guitar
- Rick Rozz – guitar
- Kam Lee – lead vocals, drums
