= Slaughter (Canadian band) =

Canadian death metal band

Background information
- Origin: Toronto, Ontario, Canada
- Genres: Death metal; thrash metal
- Years active: 1984–1992, 1996–2001, 2007–2008, 2026–present
- Label: Nuclear Blast
- Past members: Dave Hewson; Ron Sumners; Terry Sadler; Chuck Schuldiner; Brian Lourie; Bobby Sadzak

Slaughter is a Canadian death/thrash metal band that formed in Toronto, Ontario in 1984 and briefly featured guitarist Chuck Schuldiner in 1986. They released two demos and two full-length albums before disbanding from 1989 to 1995. They returned in 1996 to record a cover of Celtic Frost's "Dethroned Emperor" for the tribute album In Memory of Celtic Frost. In 2001, they re-released "Strappado" under the Nuclear Blast label.

Slaughter released a compilation of demos and live tracks on Nuclear Blast called Not Dead Yet/Paranormal. The band has reformed multiple times. Slaughter are currently working on a new release featuring rare, demo, live and rehearsal material.

On October 2, 2008, singer Dave Hewson announced that drummer Brian Lourie died of a heart attack.

In June 2026, Slaughter announced that they had reunited, and released their first song in nearly four decades, "Incinerator".

== Members ==
- Dave Hewson – vocals, guitar (1984–1992)
- Ron Sumners – drums (1984–1986)
- Terry Sadler – vocals, bass (1984–1989)
- Chuck Schuldiner – guitars (1986)
- Brian Lourie – drums (1986–1992)
- Bobby Sadzak – guitars (1988)

== Discography ==
=== Albums ===
- Strappado (1987) – Diabolic Force/Fringe Records
- Fuck of Death (2004) – Hells Headbangers Records

=== EPs ===
- Nocturnal Hell (1986) – Diabolic Force/Fringe Records
- Nocturnal Hell (2019) – Urbain Grandier Records

=== Compilations ===
- Not Dead Yet/Paranormal (2001) – Nuclear Blast
- Tortured Souls (2007) – Marquee Records
- Nocturnal Hell, Surrender or Die (2016) – Vic Records

=== Split albums ===
- Back to the Crypt/Sadist (2004) – Horror Records (split with Nunslaughter)

=== Demos ===
- Meatcleaver (1984)
- Bloody Karnage (1984)
- Surrender or Die (1985) – Diabolic Force/Fringe Records
- Paranormal (1988)
- The Dark – Demo IV (1988)
- Not Dead Yet (1990) – Headache Records

=== Live demos ===
- Live Karnage (1985)
