= Live in Eindhoven =

Live album by Death
- Released: October 30, 2001
- Recorded: May 31, 1998
- Venue: Dynamo Open Air in Eindhoven, Netherlands
- Genre: Technical death metal
- Length: 54:26
- Label: Nuclear Blast
- Producer: Chuck Schuldiner

Death chronology
Live in L.A. (Death & Raw) (2001)	Live in Eindhoven (2001)	Live in Cottbus '98 (2005)

Professional ratings
Review scores
Source	Rating
AllMusic	3/5 stars

Live in Eindhoven is the second live album by American band Death. It was recorded in Eindhoven, Netherlands at Dynamo Open Air on May 31, 1998 and released on October 30, 2001, through Nuclear Blast. The album was also released in DVD format. The performance of "Spirit Crusher" was released as a music video. It was their final release before Chuck Schuldiner succumbed to brain cancer.

== Track listing ==
All tracks are written by Chuck Schuldiner.

No.	Title	Length
1.	"The Philosopher"	4:21
2.	"Trapped in a Corner"	4:40
3.	"Crystal Mountain"	5:01
4.	"Suicide Machine"	4:19
5.	"Together as One"	4:05
6.	"Zero Tolerance"	4:50
7.	"Lack of Comprehension"	3:46
8.	"Flesh and the Power It Holds"	8:41
9.	"Flattening of Emotions"	4:26
10.	"Spirit Crusher"	6:56
11.	"Pull the Plug"	5:21
Total length:		54:26

== Overview ==
Some of the proceeds, if bought directly from the band's record label, were sent to Schuldiner.

The band was a replacement for Fear Factory.

== Personnel ==
- Chuck Schuldiner – vocals, guitar
- Richard Christy – drums
- Scott Clendenin – bass
- Shannon Hamm – guitar
