= Spiritual Healing (album) =

Studio album by Death
- Released: February 16, 1990
- Recorded: 1989
- Studios: Morrisound Recording, Tampa, Florida
- Genres: Death metal; technical death metal
- Length: 43:17
- Label: Combat
- Producers: Scott Burns; Death

Death chronology
Leprosy (1988)	Spiritual Healing (1990)	Human (1991)

Spiritual Healing is the third studio album by American death metal band Death, released on February 16, 1990, by Combat Records. It is the band's only album to feature both guitarist James Murphy and bassist Terry Butler and the last to feature drummer Bill Andrews. The album marked a shift in style and content for the band, lyrically focusing on social evils and musically being more technical, as opposed to the gore-centered, straightforward death metal of their previous two albums. Due to this shift, the album received polarizing reception upon release.

== Background and recording ==
The album was recorded at Morrisound Recording in Tampa, Florida and was produced by Scott Burns. The members of Death and their manager Eric Greif stayed in a single motel room at the Safari Inn, near Busch Gardens, for the entire six weeks the album was recorded and mixed, although bassist Terry Butler and drummer Bill Andrews frequently went home as they lived in the Tampa area.

Terry Butler recalls one moment during the recording process where Burns managed to omit an erroneous cymbal hit by cutting the tape with a razor and "splicing the tape back." Butler also stated that guitarist James Murphy misplaced his tremolo bar and performed his guitar solo on the title track using a screwdriver instead.

The "joke & jam" tracks on the Spiritual Healing re-issue were a result of heat exhaustion, as the band was practicing in a mini warehouse in summer with no air conditioning. The band would play a few songs then stop, as they would be close to passing out from the intense heat.

This was the final Death album cover painted by Ed Repka.

This period was controversial for Death, as Butler and Andrews toured Europe without Schuldiner (who refused to do the tour on the basis that it had been badly organized), with vocalist Louis Carrisalez and guitarist Walter Traschler in his place. In response, Schuldiner pursued legal action, while firing them and shifting towards employing guest musicians on future releases.

== Music and lyrics ==
Spiritual Healing has been described as "bizarre," "enigmatic" and "more avant-garde" than Death's previous releases up to that point, utilizing complex time signatures and more technical musicianship. Despite this, the album retains many of the trademark characteristics of the death metal genre, such as death growls and low-register guitar riffs. Describing the album as stylistically lying in "limbo" between the band's second and fourth albums, Matt Mills of WhatCulture assessed that Spiritual Healing "is too progressive to just be death metal, but it uses enough of the genre’s conventions that it’s not entirely progressive, either." Jon Hadusek of Consequence of Sound called the album's style "minimalist heavy metal," making note of Scott Burns' "thin" production. Lead guitar duties are traded off between Chuck Schuldiner and James Murphy. The album's song structures and guitar tones are rooted in thrash metal. In addition to the "chuggier sections", the album contains slower doom-inspired riffs, as well as sections that are more obviously melodic, a facet expanded upon by James Murphy's lead guitar work. Eli Enis at Revolver characterized the album as "marking the transition between their full-on embrace of melodeath and their gory origins." Additionally, the title track features a brief keyboard arrangement performed by Death manager Eric Greif on a Kawai K1 synthesizer.

Spiritual Healing has been called Death's "most lyrically dominated album," and is described as a concept album about mental illness and physical disability. It was the first of the band's albums to show Schuldiner's lyrics moving away from the gore and horror themes of the band's previous works (though some tracks do retain the "gratuitous" violence present previous releases). Instead, he chose to focus on social issues and "real life horror", including serial killers, drug addiction, abortion, genetic reconstruction (influenced by a story on That's Incredible!), and faith healers. According to Metal Hammer, Spiritual Healing "showed death metal could replace guts’n’gore with brains’n’ambition." The album's opening track “Living Monstrosity” explores drug addiction during pregnancy, and is written about an infant “born without eyes, hands, and a half a brain.” The album's third track “Defensive Personalities” explores bipolar disorder and schizophrenia.

== Release history ==
The album had been out of print, but was reissued by Relapse Records in November 2012.

== Reception and legacy ==
Professional ratings
Review scores
Source	Rating
About.com	4/5 stars
AllMusic	3.5/5 stars
Collector's Guide to Heavy Metal	5/10
Consequence of Sound	3.5/5 stars
Exclaim!	9/10
Metal Forces	10/10
Record Collector	4/5 stars

Spiritual Healing divided fans and critics upon release. The album's comparatively cleaner production values were not received well by more hardened extreme metal fans, while others welcomed the increased technical proficiency and refined songwriting. Allmusic would write, "On the one hand stood the more conservative, extreme metal contingent that resented the album's sacrifice of sheer musical savagery in the name of cleaner production, improved musicianship, and evident songwriting refinements; and, on the other, the more forward-thinking listeners who embraced it for all of the very same reasons."

Metal Hammer called Spiritual Healing one of the best heavy metal releases of the 1990s, commenting that, "It marks the point where Schuldiner largely jettisoned the adolescent lyrical concerns of Scream Bloody Gore and its follow-up, Leprosy, in favour of a deeper – though no less vivid – look at the human condition."

Butler and Murphy, along with Gus Rios and Matt Harvey, featured at The Brass Mug in Tampa, Florida on December 11, 2021, the 20th anniversary of Chuck Schuldiner's death, and played the tracklist of Spiritual Healing to honor Schuldiner.

== Track listing ==
All lyrics are written by Chuck Schuldiner.

No.	Title	Music	Length
1.	"Living Monstrosity"	Schuldiner	5:08
2.	"Altering the Future"	Schuldiner; Terry Butler	5:34
3.	"Defensive Personalities"	Schuldiner; Butler	4:46
4.	"Within the Mind"	Schuldiner; James Murphy	5:34
5.	"Spiritual Healing"	Schuldiner	7:44
6.	"Low Life"	Schuldiner; Murphy; Butler	5:23
7.	"Genetic Reconstruction"	Schuldiner; Murphy; Butler	4:52
8.	"Killing Spree"	Schuldiner; Murphy	4:16
Total length:			43:17

2012 reissued Relapse Records version (iTunes bonus tracks)
No.	Title	Length
9.	"Suicide Machine - Unearthed Version 2"	5:14
10.	"Suicide Machine - Unearthed Version 3"	2:17
11.	"Suicide Machine - Unearthed Version 4"	5:05
12.	"Together as One - Unearthed Version 2"	2:25
13.	"See Through Dreams - Unearthed Version 2"	2:39
Total length:		60:57

2012 reissued Relapse Records version (bonus disc)
No.	Title	Length
1.	"Altering the Future" (rehearsal)	5:34
2.	"Defensive Personalities" (rehearsal)	4:49
3.	"Within the Mind" (rehearsal)	6:08
4.	"Within the Mind - Take 2" (rehearsal)	5:59
5.	"Spiritual Healing" (rehearsal)	8:44
6.	"Killing Spree" (rehearsal)	4:18
7.	"Defensive Personalities" (studio instrumental)	4:47
8.	"Spiritual Healing" (studio instrumental)	7:48
9.	"Within the Mind" (studio instrumental)	5:37
10.	"Satanic Jam" (joke/jam tracks)	2:43
11.	"Primus Jam" (joke/jam tracks)	3:38
12.	"Jon a Qua - Take 2" (joke/jam tracks)	3:05
13.	"Jon a Qua - Take 3" (joke/jam tracks)	3:06
14.	"Jon a Qua - Take 4" (joke/jam tracks)	1:35
15.	"Jon a Qua - Take 5" (joke/jam tracks)	1:38
16.	"Jon a Qua - Take 6" (joke/jam tracks)	2:51
Total length:		73:20

== Personnel ==
Death

- Chuck Schuldiner – vocals, guitar
- James Murphy – guitar
- Terry Butler – bass
- Bill Andrews – drums

Production

- Scott Burns – production, engineering, mixing
- Death – production, engineering, mixing
- Eric Greif – management, keyboard on "Spiritual Healing"
- John Cervini, Mike Gowan – assistant engineers
- Alan Douches – remastering at West West Side Music
- Edward Repka – artwork, cover design
- David Bett – art direction
- Brian Freeman – design
- J.J. Hollis – photography
