= Symbolic (Death album) =

Studio album by Death
- Released: March 21, 1995
- Recorded: Late 1994
- Studios: Morrisound Recording, Tampa, Florida
- Genres: Technical death metal; melodic death metal
- Length: 50:36
- Label: Roadrunner
- Producer: Jim Morris

Death chronology
Individual Thought Patterns (1993)	Symbolic (1995)	The Sound of Perseverance (1998)

Symbolic is the sixth studio album by American death metal band Death, released on March 21, 1995, by Roadrunner Records. The album marked a shift towards melodic death metal, while still retaining elements of technical death metal. It is the only album to feature Bobby Koelble and Kelly Conlon on guitar and bass, respectively, and the second and last album to feature drummer Gene Hoglan.

The album has received widespread critical acclaim, and is regarded as one of the greatest death metal albums of all time. The album was remastered and reissued on April 1, 2008, with five bonus tracks.

== Background and recording ==
Symbolic was recorded in late 1994 over a six-week period at Morrisound Recording in Tampa, and was produced by Jim Morris.

== Music and lyrics ==
Symbolic showed a continued shift in sound from Death's previous albums, and was seen as a "massive shift towards melody", deviating from tropes of traditional death metal. Matt Mills of WhatCulture called the album "perfect union of melody, brutality and intricacy that [Death] had been building towards ever since Scream Bloody Gore." The album has been described as "not as mathematically progressive" as Death's two previous albums. The closing track, “Perennial Quest,” has been described as "[quaking] in its own melody like a pop song stripped for parts, doused in gallons of acid and marinated in arsenic."

Sam Sodomsky of Pitchfork said Symbolic is "the most melodic and refined" release of Death's career. The album's sound has been categorized as technical death metal and melodic death metal. Shaun Lindsley of Metal Hammer called the album a "labyrinth of technicality and cerebral lyrical meanderings displaying unsurpassable musicianship," while also describing its tracks as "catchy" and "incredibly accessible". Sam Sodomsky of Pitchfork said Symbolic is "neither as brutal as the early material nor as outwardly progressive [as Human or Individual Thought Patterns]." He also likened Schuldiner's vocals at certain parts on the album to those common in hardcore punk, describing them as "shouting through gritted teeth".

The album makes use of clean guitar tones, dissonance, arpeggios, and melodies described as sounding "Egyptian." Journalists have made note of the apparent influence of European heavy metal bands Sortilège and H-Bomb present on the track "Crystal Mountain." The song contains an acoustic guitar solo in its outro.

The album is noted for the higher tone of Schuldiner's vocals compared to the "deep death growls" on early and mid-career Death releases.

The album's lyrics have been described as "mystical," and explore topics such as political corruption, surveillance and class consciousness.

== Tour ==
Bassist Kelly Conlon was removed from the band after it completed recording the album and was replaced by Brian Benson, of Florida band Pain Principle. The Symbolic tour marked the first time that the band toured in Japan.

== Release ==
Symbolic was released by Roadrunner Records on March 21, 1995. Relativity Records made a deal with Roadrunner to release it, though Schuldiner felt that the album was not promoted well. The contract for Symbolic was a one album contract. The band did not receive the support to release a video, whereas two songs from their previous albums, titled The Philosopher (from Individual Thought Patterns) and Lack of Comprehension (from Human) did feature videos. Schuldiner originally intended for Symbolic to be the last Death album, remarking in The Metal Crusade, the Death newsletter, that he "thought SYMBOLIC was a great record to leave people with to prepare them for the next journey, "Control Denied"!

The album was remastered by Roadrunner Records in 2008 and includes five bonus tracks.

== Reception and legacy ==
Professional ratings
Review scores
Source	Rating
AllMusic	3/5 stars
Blabbermouth.net	10/10
Collector's Guide to Heavy Metal	8/10
Metal.de	10/10
Pitchfork	9.1/10
Record Collector	5/5 stars
Rock Hard	10/10
Select	3/5 stars

Many fans at the time simply couldn't get their heads around this new, progressive way of doing death metal — it could be argued that the resurgence of "gore-grind" and the revival of bands walking in the footprints of early Death, Autopsy and the like, was a reaction to Chuck's more technical and melodic experiments. Looking back on it in hindsight, while the songs on Symbolic hold up as if no time has passed, it's almost laughable to think of the hue and cry Death's perpetual shifts in direction caused.

— Blabbermouth

Symbolic has received widespread critical acclaim and is regarded by many as being Death’s greatest album, and as being one of the greatest death metal albums of all time. In a contemporary review, Select stated that "there're still lashings of gristly, growling vocals and head-in-the-groin thrashing to be had" as a listener can "snuggle up to witness what dark depths Death's 12-year career has taken them too [sic]".

A review of the 2008 re-issue in Record Collector stated that the album was as "close to flawless as metal gets, and a testament to the drive and talent of the much-missed Schuldiner". Canadian journalist Martin Popoff considered the album "the band's most impressive and crossover-ish to date", combining conventional metal, "traces of doomy, Germanic melody and heaps of progressive might." Some reviews were less favorable; Stephen Thomas Erlewine of AllMusic noted that "some of the riffs are beginning to sound a little tired and there is no great leap forward in terms of their musical ideas", though he noted that "the sheer visceral force of their sound should please their dedicated fans".

The webzine Metal Rules ranked the album as the 7th greatest extreme metal album and the 58th greatest heavy metal album of all time.

Matt Mills of WhatCulture wrote, "Symbolic is one of those once-in-a-generation metal albums that just gets everything right."

Blabbermouth wrote, "If heavy metal was a college course, "Symbolic" would be on the reading list on day fucking one."

== Track listing ==
All tracks are written by Chuck Schuldiner.

No.	Title	Length
1.	"Symbolic"	6:32
2.	"Zero Tolerance"	4:48
3.	"Empty Words"	6:22
4.	"Sacred Serenity"	4:27
5.	"1,000 Eyes"	4:28
6.	"Without Judgement"	5:28
7.	"Crystal Mountain"	5:07
8.	"Misanthrope"	5:03
9.	"Perennial Quest"	8:21
Total length:		50:37

2008 remastered bonus tracks
No.	Title	Length
10.	"Symbolic Acts" (March 1994 instrumental demo of "Symbolic")	5:55
11.	"Zero Tolerance" (March 1994 instrumental demo)	4:10
12.	"Crystal Mountain" (March 1994 instrumental demo)	4:24
13.	"Misanthrope" (March 1994 instrumental demo)	5:40
14.	"Symbolic Acts" (January 1994 4-track demo of "Symbolic" with vocals)	5:55
Total length:		76:40

== Personnel ==
Most of the information here is adapted from the CD liner notes of the original 1995 release and the 2008 reissue.

Death

- Chuck Schuldiner – guitars, vocals, bass, drum programming on January 1994 demo, co–production
- Bobby Koelble – guitars
- Kelly Conlon – bass
- Gene Hoglan – drums
- Steve Di Giorgio – bass on March 1994 demo

Technical personnel

- Jim Morris – production, engineering
- George Marino – mastering, remastering
- Patricia Mooney – design
- René Miville – artwork, photography

== Charts ==
1995 chart performance for Symbolic
Chart (1995)	Peak position
Dutch Albums (Album Top 100)	68
UK Rock & Metal Albums (Official Charts)	30

2025 chart performance for Symbolic
Chart (2025)	Peak position
Austrian Albums (Ö3 Austria)	64
Belgian Albums (Ultratop Flanders)	111
Croatian International Albums (HDU)	8
Danish Vinyl Albums (Hitlisten)	6
Finnish Albums (Suomen virallinen lista)	37
German Albums (Offizielle Top 100)	35
German Rock & Metal Albums (Offizielle Top 100)	10
Greek Albums (IFPI)	96
Hungarian Albums (MAHASZ)	12
Norwegian Physical Albums (IFPI Topplista)	10
Polish Albums (ZPAV)	32
Scottish Albums (Official Charts)	50
Swedish Physical Albums (Sverigetopplistan)	19
Swedish Vinyl Albums (Sverigetopplistan)	10
Swiss Albums (Schweizer Hitparade)	87
UK Album Sales (OCC)	66
