= Death (metal band) =

American death metal band

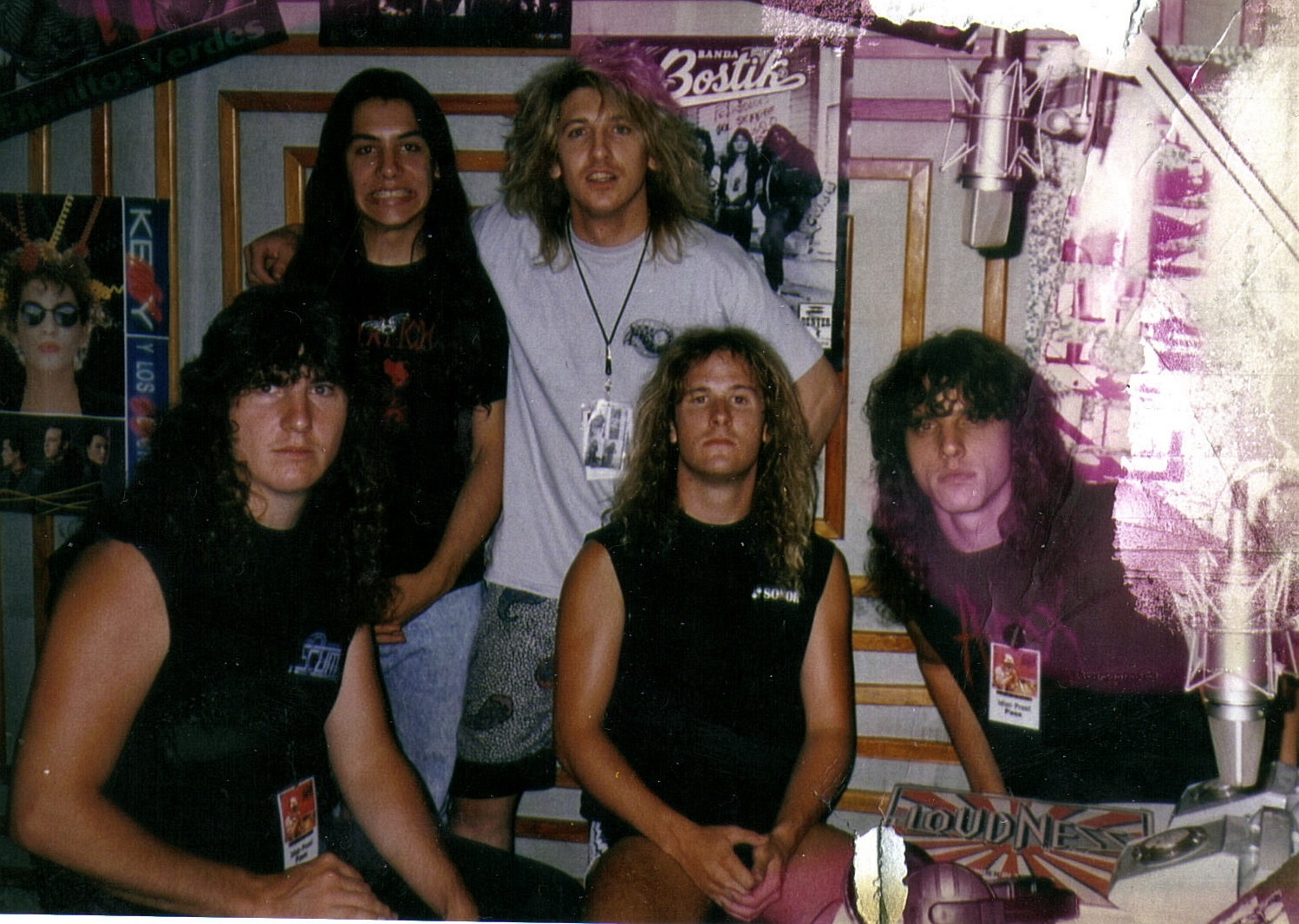
- Death in 1989, from left to right: Terry Butler, Paul Masvidal, manager Eric Greif, Bill Andrews, and Chuck Schuldiner

Background information
- Also known as: Mantas (1983–1984)
- Origin: Altamonte Springs, Florida, U.S.
- Genres: Death metal; progressive metal; technical death metal
- Works: Albums
- Years active: 1983–1995; 1997–2001
- Labels: Combat; Roadrunner; Nuclear Blast; Relativity; Relapse; UMG
- Spinoffs: Autopsy
- Past members: Final lineup: Chuck Schuldiner; Shannon Hamm; Richard Christy; Scott Clendenin List of previous members
- Website: emptywords.org

Death was an American death metal band formed in Altamonte Springs, Florida, in 1983 by guitarist Chuck Schuldiner (who later became the band's sole vocalist), drummer/vocalist Kam Lee, and guitarist Rick Rozz. Formed out of what would become the Florida death metal scene, Death is considered a pioneering death metal band. The band's 1987 debut album, Scream Bloody Gore, is regarded as one of the first death metal records, alongside the first records from Possessed and Necrophagia.

Death had a fluctuating lineup, with Schuldiner, aside from a European tour, the sole consistent member. The group's style progressed from the raw sound on its first two albums to a more complex one in its later stage. The band disbanded after Schuldiner died of glioma and pneumonia in December 2001, but remains an enduring influence on death metal.

== History ==
=== Early history (1983–1985) ===
Chuck Schuldiner co-founded Mantas with Rick Rozz and Kam Lee in either 1983 or 1984 in Altamonte Springs, Florida. Death was among the more widely known pioneers of the death metal sound, along with California's Possessed.

Schuldiner, Rozz and Lee composed songs that were released on several rehearsal tapes in 1984. These tapes, along with the Death by Metal demo, circulated through the tape-trader world, establishing the band's name. In 1984, Schuldiner dissolved Mantas and started a band named Death with the same members. In an article written in December 2010, Tim Aymar stated that Schuldiner renamed the band Death to turn the death of his brother Frank years earlier into "something positive". Inspired by Nasty Savage, Death was among the first bands in the Florida death metal scene. Another demo was released, Reign of Terror.

In 1985, the Infernal Death tape was recorded and released. Rick Rozz was out of the band by early 1985. Schuldiner and Lee played with Scott Carlson and Matt Olivo, bassist and guitarist, respectively, of the band Genocide (later renamed Repulsion) for a short time. Lee had "personal problems" that caused him to be ejected from the band. Combat Records had offered the band a deal if they recorded another demo; the band could not convince Lee to rejoin. Olivo and Carlson left soon after. Schuldiner moved to the San Francisco Bay Area and recruited former Dirty Rotten Imbeciles drummer Eric Brecht, in addition to guitarist Erik Meade, who learned bass guitar. The band recorded the Back from the Dead demo and played shows at Ruthies Inn. Schuldiner was unhappy with this incarnation of Death, partly because he felt that Brecht, who had incorporated blast beats, was playing too fast, and moved back to Florida without a band. In 1986, Canadian thrash metal band Slaughter invited Schuldiner to play on their album. He accepted and moved to Canada. This only lasted two weeks, and he returned to the States. He returned to Florida, then moved back to the San Francisco Bay Area again, where he joined 17-year-old drummer Chris Reifert.

=== Record deal and Scream Bloody Gore (1986–1987) ===
Scream Bloody Gore had been sent to me as promo. I looked at the cover and giggled a little, and thought "wow, that's brutal", but never actually listened to it. And at that time, of course, all of the reviews for Death were horrible – across the board. Anyone who claimed that they liked Death two years later [and tried saying] they liked Death when Scream Bloody Gore came out, was a liar [...] All off these established writers wrote off Death at the beginning. [...] It was a joke. Even the guy that signed Death to Combat, Steve Sinclair, considered it a joke. He really only signed him at Don Kaye's insistence.

— Eric Greif, manager of Death, as quoted by Albert Mudrian of Decibel (May 24, 2016)

Schuldiner and Reifert recorded the Mutilation demo in April 1986, which led to a deal with Combat Records. That summer, they began recording their first album, which was abandoned and written off as a mistake after Combat was unsatisfied with the recording, which Reifert blamed on the studio engineers. In November 1986, the band was sent to Los Angeles to re-record the album at The Music Grinder with Randy Burns, which the band felt optimistic about due to his work on Possessed's Seven Churches. The basic tracks were recorded in a couple of days, while Schuldiner recorded the bass, lead guitars and vocals at Rock Steady Studios, also in L.A.

Scream Bloody Gore was released in 1987 and is considered a genre template for death metal. The band briefly had a second guitar player, John Hand, but he did not appear on the album (though his photo did). Schuldiner and Reifert recruited Steve Di Giorgio of Sadus and rehearsed in Concord for live shows, which never took place as Schuldiner moved back to Florida. Reifert remained in California, where he formed Autopsy. Back in Florida, Schuldiner teamed up with former bandmate Rick Rozz and two members of Rozz's band Massacre, Terry Butler and Bill Andrews.

=== Mid-era: Leprosy, Spiritual Healing and Human (1988–1992) ===
In 1988, that line-up recorded Leprosy. After much touring in support of the album, including a quick and ill-planned tour of Europe, Rozz was fired in 1989. After a tour of Mexico featuring guitarist Paul Masvidal (later to re-emerge in the Death lineup), a replacement was found in James Murphy, with whom they recorded their third album, Spiritual Healing, in Tampa in the summer of 1989. Murphy left the band relatively quickly. By this time, Schuldiner abandoned the "gore" lyrical theme for more social critique. Melody was added to the band's sound.

Chuck Schuldiner in an interview in 1991, about youth, money, record labels and death.

In 1990, on the eve of a European tour, Schuldiner decided against traveling, claiming at the last minute that he felt the tour was not adequately organized (and citing the group's previous disorganized European tour in 1988) as well as having personal problems. Andrews and Butler continued with the tour of Europe as Death to fulfill the band's contractual obligations, and recruited roadies Walter Trachsler and Louie Carrisalez to replace Schuldiner on guitar and vocals, respectively. Schuldiner was shocked and disgusted, and pursued legal action against Butler and Andrews.

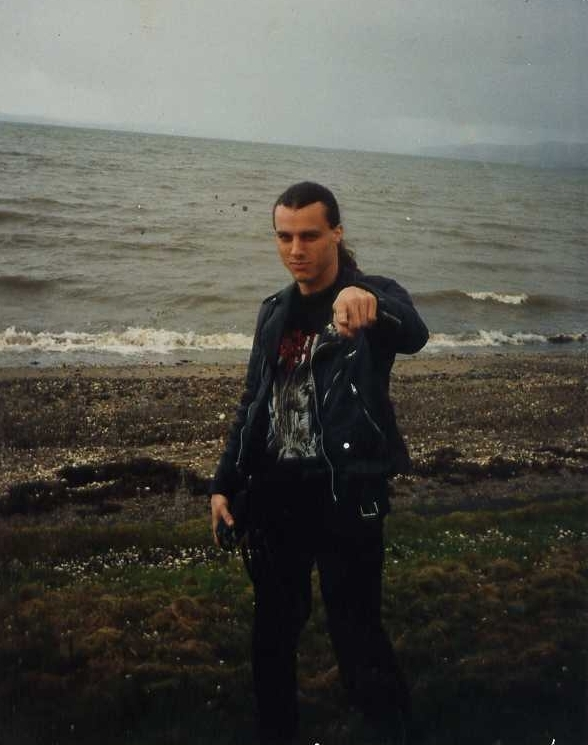
Chuck Schuldiner circa 1992

Schuldiner abandoned the idea of a band set-up and began working with session musicians. Schuldiner recruited Paul Masvidal and Sean Reinert from underground Florida band Cynic and hired Steve Di Giorgio from California band Sadus. In 1991, Death released Human, considered a more technical and progressive album than their previous works, incorporating complex rhythms, riffs and song structures. Human was Death's best-selling album yet, receiving many accolades and some MTV play for the group's first video, directed by David Bellino, for the track "Lack of Comprehension". Due to obligations with his primary band Sadus, Di Giorgio departed after the recording of Human and new bassist Scott Carino did Death's extensive world tour, from October 1991 until April 1992, in addition to appearing in the music video for "Lack of Comprehension".

=== Final years: Individual Thought Patterns, Symbolic, The Sound of Perseverance and Schuldiner's death (1993–2001) ===
Di Giorgio called Reinert and told him that he was replaced with Gene Hoglan, while Di Giorgio and Hoglan were in the studio working on the album Individual Thought Patterns. Hoglan had been playing with the recently dissolved thrash metal band Dark Angel, while Andy LaRocque from King Diamond guested on guitar. Since LaRocque was obligated to his band, Schuldiner hired Ralph Santolla as touring guitarist for a European tour in April, called Full of Hate, as well as the American release tour that started in July. Forbidden guitarist Craig Locicero was enlisted to take Santolla's place, as he was busy playing with his band Eyewitness, and played another European tour, which started in Bradford, England, that September. The video for the track "The Philosopher" made it on to an episode of Beavis and Butt-Head in 1994 (Beavis also parodies Schuldiner's vocals in a mock 'drive-thru' order of 'tacos, to go!' in death metal style). Also in 1994, Death ended its eight-year relationship with Relativity and signed with Roadrunner Records, their European distributor. For 1995's Symbolic, LaRocque and Di Giorgio were exchanged for underground Florida musicians Kelly Conlon and Bobby Koelble. Conlon was let go from the band prior to the Symbolic tour and Brian Benson replaced him.

After touring for Symbolic, Schuldiner broke up Death following tension with Roadrunner Records and focused on Control Denied. Schuldiner signed with record label Nuclear Blast in late 1997, though the label required that another Death album be released before a Control Denied album could be issued. The seventh Death release, The Sound of Perseverance, was completed at Morrisound Recording in Tampa and released on Nuclear Blast in 1998. Schuldiner partnered with his Control Denied collaborators at the time, Scott Clendenin and Shannon Hamm, in addition to drummer Richard Christy. Schuldiner had hoped to play with Di Giorgio (who had recorded demos for the album), but he did not have the time.

After the album and two supporting tours, Schuldiner put Death aside to pursue Control Denied with Christy and Hamm. Clendenin was dropped in April 1999, in favor of Steve Di Giorgio, who had become available, while underground power metal singer Tim Aymar had joined the band in 1997. Although the line-up and writing style were largely the same, Schuldiner created Control Denied because he was displeased with the harsher vocals for Death. He created a new band to avoid betraying what Death meant and sounded like to fans, remarking: "For me, it is just a matter of evolving, doing it the right way. I didn't put out a Death record with this stuff on it. I made the right choice and changed the name of the band. I tried to do everything the right way."

There were plans for a Death show in June 1999 in Italy at Gods of Metal, with Metallica headlining. As Schuldiner finished Control Denied's debut album, he was diagnosed with brain cancer, forcing the band to scrap plans for a U.S. and Canadian tour. As he worked on the second release, Schuldiner's condition improved, but the tumor left him in a weakened, vulnerable state. He contracted pneumonia and was hospitalized. On December 13, 2001, Schuldiner was released and returned home. He died an hour after arriving home.

=== Aftermath and further developments (2002-present) ===
The second Control Denied release was not completed. Mired in legal problems involving its Dutch label, the musicians and Schuldiner's sister Beth, the former of whom have publicly stated their desire to complete the album, and former manager Eric Greif representing the Estate. In 2004, Hammerheart Records released a two-part bootleg made up of old, pre-Scream Bloody Gore demos, along with partial demos of the unfinished album and live Death recordings from 1990. This was issued under the name Chuck Schuldiner, not Death or Control Denied, but its markedly unfinished state and lack of vocals led to the release not being successful, aided by Schuldiner's mother Jane's pleas for fans to stay away from it. In 2009, the legal matters were settled, allowing for the Control Denied album to be completed by the other musicians.

On May 12, 2010, it was announced that Perseverance Holdings Ltd. had partnered with Relapse Records to re-master and re-issue the Death and Control Denied releases, as well as his earlier work in Mantas. On December 13 of the same year, it was announced that The Sound of Perseverance would be the first Death album to receive this treatment, and was released February 2011 in a 2-CD and 3-CD format. The Human album has been remixed, with Schuldiner's intellectual property lawyer Eric Greif stating that Sony had lost the tapes of the original mixes, and was reissued in 2-CD and 3-CD formats as well as a digital release. Individual Thought Patterns was reissued in October 2011. In February 2012, Relapse Records released a 2 CD live album entitled Vivus! that included the previously released 1998 concerts Live in L.A. and Live in Eindhoven, including liner notes by drummer Christy and manager/lawyer Greif. The Relapse deal does not include Death's acclaimed 1995 album Symbolic, whose rights are still retained by Roadrunner Records as of 2008.

On March 16, 2012, it was announced by Sick Drummer Magazine and the Schuldiner's corporation, Perseverance Holdings Ltd, that musicians who previously played in Death would take part in a benefit tour titled "Death to All" for the Sweet Relief Musicians Fund. The former Death members slated to participate were drummers Gene Hoglan and Sean Reinert, bassists Steve Di Giorgio and Scott Clendenin, guitarists Paul Masvidal, Shannon Hamm and Bobby Koelble. It was later announced that Obscura vocalist Steffen Kummerer and Abysmal Dawn/Bereft frontman Charles Elliott would assume vocal and guitar duties for the tour, but visa issues made Kummerer's participation impossible and he was replaced by Exhumed vocalist/guitarist Matt Harvey. After the tour, Eric Greif, acting as President of Perseverance Holdings Ltd. (PHL), alleged that the owners of Sick Drummer Magazine had not paid the charity, the musicians, PHL, the crew or the booking agency despite the five shows of the tour being successful. However, dates for a second edition of the tour were announced in February 2013, with no involvement from Sick Drummer Magazine, and a successful tour of North America in April 2013 was followed by a sold out three-week European tour in November 2013, featuring Masvidal, Reinert, Di Giorgio and vocalist/guitarist Max Phelps. The Death To All moniker was altered to Death (DTA).

Scott Clendenin died on March 24, 2015, at the age of 48.

Eric Greif, the band's long-time manager and producer, died on October 29, 2021, at the age of 59.

On November 3, 2021, it was announced that former Death members would play two Florida shows in December 2021 to commemorate the 20th anniversary of the passing of Schuldiner. The lineup will feature James Murphy and Terry Butler, as well as Gus Rios and Matt Harvey of Gruesome playing under the name Living Monstrosity, who will play Spiritual Healing in its entirety. Steve DiGiorgio, Bobby Koelble, Kelly Conlon, Dirk Verbeuren, Max Phelps, and Leo Lozano will play under the name Symbolic, playing songs from Human, Individual Thought Patterns, Symbolic, and The Sound of Perseverance.

Phelps, Di Giorgio, Koelble and Hoglan will take part in a North American tour in the spring of 2023 under the name Death To All (DTA) to commemorate the 30th anniversary of Individual Thought Patterns.

Rozz, Butler, Harvey, and Rios are actively performing at live events in 2024 under the name Left to Die. The band formed not long after Harvey and Rios played the Death tribute show in 2021. The band released an album called Initium Mortis in July 2026, which featured a variety of Mantas and Death songs from Death's early demo era.

== Artistry ==
=== Musical style and instrumentation ===
Death were considered pioneers of the death metal subgenre of heavy metal. According to Malcolm Dome of Metal Hammer, Death "took the thrash template and intensified it, adding guttural vocals, a style that few outside the tape trading network would have been familiar with." Music biographer Garry Sharpe-Young considered Death "a genre-breaking band centered upon frontman Chuck Schuldiner" and that the band "would become one of the prime instigators of the death metal movement". However, Schuldiner dismissed such attributions by stating, in an interview with Metal-Rules.com, "I don't think I should take the credits for this death metal stuff. I'm just a guy from a band, and I think Death is a metal band". In Death's later output, their music became more technical and melodic, showcasing a technical death metal, progressive metal, and melodic death metal style. According to Loudwire, "With 1990s Spiritual Healing, Death started to transform into a progressive, technical death metal band, adding abrupt 90-degree rhythm shifts and multiple tempo changes without sacrificing their heavy groove." Joe DiVita of Loudwire said "along with Carcass and At the Gates, Death helped pave the way for infectious melodies and hooks to enter the genre." Complex time signatures also became a hallmark of the band's style later in their career.

Regarding percussion styles, Gene Hoglan is recognized as a percussionist using double kick drum equipment and one of a crop who "set new standards in speed and endurance". During an interview he described Sean Reinert's drumming on Human as "godly", and praised it as "the fastest double bassing around at the time" and "a template which we tried to match on Individual Thought Patterns".

=== Imagery and lyrics ===
The final logo used by the band, as seen on the album artwork for The Sound of Perseverance

The band's early releases were described as having taken a "gratuitous gorehound lyrical approach", exploring topics such as zombies and slasher-film style violence. Later releases dealt with topics such as religion, serial killers and substance abuse. Schuldiner said, "I got fed up with writing about crap monsters. [...] What's horrific about that sort of thing? The real evil in this world goes on in society. I'd just reached a time in my life as a person and as a musician when I felt angry enough to write about it."

Kam Lee designed Death's original logo before he was removed from the band. Schuldiner subsequently designed the logo's various incarnations throughout the remainder of the band's existence. In 1991, before the release of Human, he cleaned up the logo; he took out more intricate details, and the "T" in the logo was swapped from an inverted cross to a more regular-looking "T", one reason being to quash any implication of being anti-religious. The logo was changed again, between Symbolic and The Sound of Perseverance, to "a more streamlined look"; also, a hooded reaper was removed above the "H".

=== Influences ===
Schuldiner was quoted saying, "I love the New Wave Of British Heavy Metal [...] but I wanted to combine their style with the harder end; with what Slayer and Venom were doing. I didn't set out to create something new – it just happened." His main influences as a guitarist were Yngwie Malmsteen, Eddie Van Halen and both Dave Murray and Adrian Smith of Iron Maiden. He was also influenced by numerous bands such as Black Sabbath, Kiss, Van Halen, Saxon, Iron Maiden, Rush, Raven, Mercyful Fate, Venom, Hellhammer, Celtic Frost, Savatage, Slayer, Metallica, Anthrax, Exciter, Manowar, Judas Priest, Nasty Savage, Possessed and Sacrifice. As inspirations to the technical/progressive direction of Death's last four studio albums, the band also cited Queensrÿche, Dream Theater, Carcass, Coroner, Watchtower and Psychotic Waltz.

== Other projects ==
Members of Death have since stayed active as musicians. Gene Hoglan from Dark Angel and Andy LaRocque from King Diamond had already made a name for themselves, with LaRocque continuing to work with King Diamond while Hoglan has done stints with a wide variety of bands including Strapping Young Lad, Old Man's Child, Opeth, Zimmers Hole, Unearth, Pitch Black Forecast, Dethklok, Fear Factory, and most recently, Testament. Paul Masvidal found success with Cynic alongside fellow Death member Sean Reinert, who continue to release albums and tour in the present. Richard Christy went on to gigs with Acheron and Iced Earth before joining The Howard Stern Show, though he has recently resurfaced on the metal scene with Charred Walls of the Damned and guesting on a Crotchduster album. Ralph Santolla has also played with Iced Earth, as well as Sebastian Bach; both are bands which Steve DiGiorgio played in as well. Santolla was in Obituary and he was previously in Deicide. Di Giorgio also played for Testament and is still active with his original band Sadus. Bobby Koelble founded the Orlando rock-funk-Latin fusion group JunkieRush in 2000. He joined the Jazz faculty of the University of Central Florida (UCF) in 2007, and performs and records with The Jazz Professors. James Murphy was also in Testament, formed projects such as Disincarnate, as well as having stints with death metal bands Obituary and Cancer. Murphy was also stricken with a noncancerous brain tumor, for which he received treatment, and, along with Deron Miller of CKY, attempted to organize a Death tribute album. Kam Lee became well known as the frontman and face of the band Massacre, and formed the band Denial Fiend with Terry Butler, who has also found success in Six Feet Under and is currently in Obituary. Lee also continues to perform and record today with numerous underground projects, including Bone Gnawer and The Grotesquery.

== Legacy and influence ==
Death is considered to be both a pioneering force in death metal, and one of the most influential bands in the history of heavy metal in general. Dom Lawson of Metal Hammer wrote, "few could dispute that Chuck Schuldiner and Death towered over the entire scene for the entirety of their all-too-brief existence." Eli Enis at Revolver wrote, "With each album, from 1987 debut Scream Bloody Gore to their 1998 swansong The Sound of Perseverance, Schuldiner and Co. delivered songs that not only defined the genre, but helped push it into its most progressive and exciting realms." Blabbermouth wrote "each of Death's seven studio albums can be seen as both a fully-realized milestone in metal history, and a transition point leading into a future few could envision at the time." Dom Lawson of Metal Hammer wrote, "[Death] were always a couple of steps ahead of the game and audibly, thrillingly devoted to pushing extreme metal into uncharted territory." Scream Bloody Gore is widely regarded as the first death metal album. Death is also now recognized as one of the most acclaimed music groups of all time, held in high praise by critics, metal musicians, and fans.

Many bands cited Death as an influence such as Obituary, Hail of Bullets, Meshuggah, Baroness, Cormorant, Fear Factory, Revocation, Exhumed, Obscura, Cynic, Opeth, the Dillinger Escape Plan, Suicide Silence, Mastodon, Gojira and System of a Down. Kelly Schaefer of Atheist stated that Schuldiner's spirit of competition inspired the band to pursue innovation in the death metal genre themselves. George "Corpsegrinder" Fisher of Cannibal Corpse said that Schuldiner "inspired [him] to become death metal singer."

Death's influence extends beyond the death metal genre. Corey Taylor of Slipknot has cited Death as an important influence. Herman Li and all the members of DragonForce have expressed their appreciation for Death, and covered "Evil Dead" on their album "Reaching Into Infinity", saying they consider the band "legendary".

In January 2001, Mahyar Dean, an Iranian musician, wrote Death, a book about Death and Schuldiner, and released it in Iran. The book includes bilingual lyrics and many articles about the band. The book was sent from the site keepers of emptywords.org to Schuldiner, who in his words was "truly blown away and extremely honored by the obvious work and devotion he put into bringing the book to life". A documentary entitled Death by Metal was released in 2016. That same year, the staff of Loudwire named them the tenth-best metal band of all time, saying: "Evil Chuck was careful never to retrace his steps, keeping his wheel in a constant state of forward motion. Pushing the genre into new sonic realms with each subsequent release, he helped bring technical guitar playing and songwriting to the fold as well as ambitious progressivity found in the later era of Death. With each album a genuine highlight, Death’s discography is a perfect snapshot of death metal evolution."

== Band members ==
Final lineup

- Chuck Schuldiner – guitars (1983–1995, 1997–2001; his death), vocals (1984–1995, 1997–2001; his death), bass (1983–1984, 1984–1985, 1986–1987)
- Shannon Hamm – guitars (1997–2001)
- Richard Christy – drums (1997–2001)
- Scott Clendenin – bass (1998–2001; died 2015)

== Discography ==
=== Studio albums ===
- Scream Bloody Gore (1987)
- Leprosy (1988)
- Spiritual Healing (1990)
- Human (1991)
- Individual Thought Patterns (1993)
- Symbolic (1995)
- The Sound of Perseverance (1998)
