= Shannon Hamm =

American guitarist

- Born: December 10, 1967 (age 58)
- Genres: Death metal; technical death metal; heavy metal
- Occupation: Guitarist
- Formerly of: Death, Control Denied

Shannon Hamm (born December 10, 1967) is an American musician, best known as being the guitarist for death metal band Death from 1998 until their breakup in 2001 upon the death of leader Chuck Schuldiner. He had previously joined Schuldiner's progressive metal band, Control Denied.

== Career ==
Hamm was part of a Houston, Texas-based metal band called Metalstorm back in the 1980s. He was particularly good friends with "Diamond" Darrell Abbott of Pantera. According to Abbott, Hamm "out shredded" Darrell in Pantera's glam metal days while Hamm was in Metalstorm, as they were both part of the local metal music scene in Texas.

He moved to Florida in 1994 and began searching for fellow musicians, connecting with Chris Williams, the drummer for Talonzfury. Williams auditioned for Chuck Schuldiner and was hired as the first Control Denied drummer, with Hamm following a month later.

Schuldiner signed with Nuclear Blast in 1997, which allowed him to do a Control Denied album after releasing another Death album. As a result, Hamm played on the last Death album, The Sound of Perseverance, and toured with the band in 1998. The following year, he played guitar on the album for Control Denied, The Fragile Art of Existence.

On December 12, 2007, Hamm played in a tribute show at Theatre Imperial in Quebec for the anniversary of Schuldiner's death. Former Death guitarist Bobby Koelble and former Death bassist Scott Clendenin, along with Nick Barker of Cradle of Filth and Dimmu Borgir fame, also played at the show. Most of the guitar work and singing was performed by the members of Symbolic, a Death tribute band. The show was filmed and was set to be released in December 2010.

== Personal life ==
On October 1, 2009, it was announced that Shannon Hamm had suffered a serious heart attack while at home and was hospitalized.

== Discography ==
- Death - The Sound of Perseverance (1998)
- Control Denied - The Fragile Art of Existence (1999)
