= Bobby Koelble =

American guitarist

- Born: September 13, 1968 (age 58); Orlando, Florida, U.S.
- Genres: Heavy metal; death metal; progressive metal; jazz
- Occupation: Musician
- Member of: Death To All; Leviathan Project; The Jazz Professors; Expedition Delta; Bobby Koelble Quartet
- Formerly of: Death; Azrael

Bobby Koelble (born September 13, 1968) is an American guitarist who performs in the death metal, blues, funk and jazz genres, and as a freelance studio musician. He is probably best known for his performances with the death metal band Death. The album he played on, Symbolic, was regarded by Joel McIver of British music magazine Record Collector "as close to flawless as metal gets."

== Early years ==
Born in Newark, New Jersey, Koelble's family moved to central Florida when he was three years old. He began playing the organ when he was seven. By thirteen, Koelble transitioned to guitar, inspired by hard rock bands like Van Halen and AC/DC. His evolution into metal music was influenced by bands like Iron Maiden, Motörhead and Judas Priest.

== Education ==
Koelble graduated the Berklee College of Music with a bachelor's degree in performance.

== Career ==
Koelble works on original projects, as a leader, and performs for other groups as freelancer, and in studio work.

=== Performance ===
Koelble is best known for his time in the later years of Death (1994-1995). He was hired as lead guitarist for their 6th studio album, Symbolic.

Koelble joined Death when its founder, Chuck Schuldiner, whom he had met in high school in the Orlando area, was recommended to him through a friend working at a local music store.

Koelble toured with the band in the United States, Canada, Europe, and Japan, before Death was disbanded temporarely.

He performs with The Jazz Professors, a jazz group with two Top-20 Billboard Jazz albums.

=== Teaching ===
- Adjunct Professor, Jazz Guitar - University of Central Florida (2007–)
- Adjunct Professor, Jazz Guitar - Rollins College (1998–)
- Visiting professor, Seminole Community College (2003–2005)

=== Other ===
Instructor/Consultant - TalkingTabs, producing guitar instruction for the blind and learning disabled.
