= Chuck Schuldiner =

American musician (1967–2001)

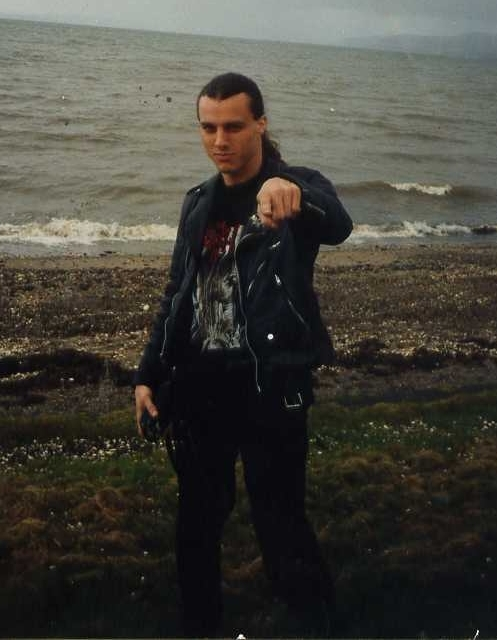
- Schuldiner, circa 1992

Background information
- Also known as: The Godfather of death metal; Evil Chuck (early career)
- Born: Charles Michael Schuldiner; May 13, 1967; Long Island, New York, U.S.
- Died: December 13, 2001 (aged 34) Altamonte Springs, Florida, U.S.
- Genres: Death metal; technical death metal
- Occupations: Musician; songwriter
- Instruments: Vocals; guitar; bass
- Years active: 1983–2001
- Formerly of: Death; Slaughter; Control Denied; Voodoocult
- Website: emptywords.org

Charles Michael Schuldiner (/ʃuːlˈdiːnər/; May 13, 1967 – December 13, 2001) was an American musician. He co-founded the pioneering Florida death metal band Death in 1983, in which he was the guitarist, primary songwriter and only continuous member until his death in 2001 of a brain tumor. He became the lead vocalist in 1985 after original drummer and vocalist Kam Lee left the band. His obituary in the January 5, 2002, issue of Kerrang! described him as "one of the most significant figures in the history of metal." Schuldiner was ranked No. 10 in Joel McIver's book The 100 Greatest Metal Guitarists in 2009 and No. 20 in March 2004 Guitar World's "The 100 Greatest Metal Guitarists". In 1987, Schuldiner founded the publishing company Mutilation Music, affiliated with performance rights organization BMI.

== Biography ==
=== Early life and education ===
Charles Michael Schuldiner was born on May 13, 1967, on Long Island, New York. His father Mal Schuldiner was Jewish and the son of Austrian immigrants, and his mother Jane Schuldiner was from the American South and had converted to Judaism.

In 1968, his family moved to Florida. The area was relatively undeveloped, and Schuldiner spent much of his time playing with his siblings in the wooded areas around his house. He became interested in art, music and sculpting at an early age, and started playing guitar at the age of nine. Schuldiner was deeply affected by the death of his older brother Frank. Frank's death has been variously reported as from a car accident or from a gunshot wound to the head. Schuldiner, who was very close with Frank, "never really came to terms with" the latter's passing, according to his mother. Schuldiner's parents bought him an acoustic guitar to help him cope with the grieving process. Schuldiner quickly grew bored of guitar lessons, and found more interest in playing the electric guitar. According to his mother, "From the first time he played the electric guitar it was as if a switch was turned on in him and it never turned off".

Through his parents, Schuldiner was exposed to a wide range of other influences. He was particularly interested in the metal movement known as NWOBHM, and cited bands of that genre among his favorites. Schuldiner cited progressive metal bands such as Watchtower and Queensrÿche as influences in a 1991 interview, as well as Kiss and Metallica, Slayer, Iron Maiden, Mercyful Fate, and Raven were among the bands that he claimed as influences in a 1993 interview. The official Schuldiner website, Empty Words, quotes Schuldiner's mother making the claim that he enjoyed all forms of music except country and rap.

Schuldiner's mother said he formed his first band in the family's garage a few years after his brother's death. She stated he played his first live show at age 15 in a park near the family's residence in Altamonte Springs, Florida.

Schuldiner performed well in school before becoming bored with education and eventually dropping out. He later regretted this decision. He has stated that if he had not become a musician, he would have liked to have become a veterinarian or a cook.

=== Musical career ===
Taking inspiration from Nasty Savage, Schuldiner formed Mantas (which he later renamed Death) in 1983 when he was 16 years old. He played guitar in the band, while Rick Rozz was on guitar and Kam Lee played the drums and performed the vocals. In January 1986, Schuldiner moved to Toronto and temporarily joined the Canadian band Slaughter. However, he quickly returned to continue the formation of Death.

Death underwent many lineup changes. With Chris Reifert, Schuldiner eventually released the first Death album, titled Scream Bloody Gore, in 1987. He continued with 1988's Leprosy with the line-up of former Mantas guitarist Rick Rozz and rhythm section Terry Butler on bass and Bill Andrews on drums, and 1990's Spiritual Healing, where guitarist James Murphy had replaced Rozz in 1989.

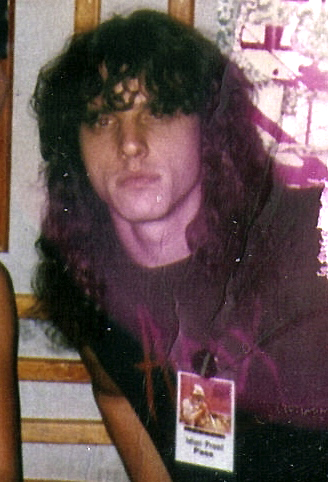
Schuldiner in 1989

After Spiritual Healing, Schuldiner stopped working with full-time band members, preferring to work with studio and live venue musicians, due to bad relationships with Death's previous rhythm section and guitarists. This earned Schuldiner something of a 'perfectionist' reputation in the metal community. Schuldiner had also fired his manager Eric Greif but settled and re-hired him before the recording of his next, influential release.

Chuck Schuldiner in an interview for German Public Radio in 1991

Death's breakthrough album, Human saw the band evolving to a more technical and progressive style, in which Schuldiner displayed his guitar skills more than ever. He continued in this style (and continued the success of the band) with 1993's Individual Thought Patterns and 1995's Symbolic. He announced the following year that he had broken up Death and would focus on his new progressive metal band, Control Denied.

Schuldiner also played guitar in the supergroup Voodoocult on the album Jesus Killing Machine in 1994 and played a guest solo on Naphobia's 1995 release, Of Hell on the track "As Ancients Evolve" as a favor to the band's bassist at the time who was a friend of Schuldiner's. Schuldiner played lead guitar on a tribute track to Randy Rhoads called Hardly A Day Goes By with his Control Denied bandmates Chris Williams on drums, and Scott Clendenin on bass, as well as Craig Sease on vocals.

He secured a record deal with Nuclear Blast in 1997, but the label required that he release another Death album before Control Denied. As a result, The Sound of Perseverance was released in 1998, followed by the Control Denied album The Fragile Art of Existence the next year. Control Denied also had other players from the latest Death album but featured Tim Aymar, a melodic metal vocalist, as well as DiGiorgio. In a 1999 interview, Schuldiner spoke about why he didn't sing on the Control Denied album The Fragile Art of Existence "...these vocals are all I ever wanted to do in Death but couldn't. I've had this dream of recording like that for years, and it seems like a dream come true. Tim Aymar is an amazing singer and this is the main difference."

Schuldiner was also asked to be one of the many guest vocalists on Dave Grohl's 2001 Probot, but was unable to participate due to poor health. Grohl, Napalm Death, Ozzy Osbourne, and Anthrax all raised funds for Schuldiner's medical bills.

=== Illness and death ===
Schuldiner had experienced "extreme neck pain" in early 1999 and was diagnosed with pontine glioma that May, on his 32nd birthday. Doctors said that the tumor had existed since his childhood, and he had shown no signs or symptoms prior to his diagnosis. He had surgery in New York City in January 2000, which removed half of the tumor.

He continued his work with Control Denied. In May 2001, it was announced that Schuldiner's cancer had reappeared. He was at first unable to afford the surgery that he needed immediately. A press release called for support from everyone, including fellow artists. Jane Schuldiner urged all who read the statements about Schuldiner and his illness to obtain health insurance, stating her frustration in the American healthcare system. Schuldiner had taken out medical insurance after his first surgery, but the insurer had refused to pay because the cancer pre-dated insurance being taken out. Many artists, including Kid Rock, Korn, and Red Hot Chili Peppers, got together during the summer of 2001 to auction off personal items, with the funds assisting Schuldiner's medical expenses, an effort covered by MTV. The auction was poorly managed and only a small amount of money was received by the Schuldiners. Matt Heafy, vocalist and guitarist for Trivium, has stated that at the age of 15 his band had played a benefit show for Schuldiner while he was in the hospital in their days as a local band. Other artists that supported Schuldiner during this time include Dave Grohl, Napalm Death, Ozzy Osbourne, and Anthrax.

The cancer ultimately spread to parts of Schuldiner's brain that were said to be "too sensitive for surgery". Despite this, he continued to write music as his condition worsened. According to his mother, "He drove himself unmercifully that last year [...] We worried so much about him and begged him to rest. As the perfectionist he is, he said [the music] was "just OK" and that wasn't good enough for him or his fans. He would go on until he couldn't anymore, and he really mourned that he couldn’t finish it." Control Denied drummer Richard Christy said "It was inspiring to see somebody going through something so hard and still playing guitar and writing music. Chuck was just so committed. He gave it everything he had."

By December 2001, Tim Aymar stated that "Chuck is in very bad shape." During this time, Schuldiner was in hospice under the care of his mother. At 4 PM EST on December 13, 2001, Schuldiner died. According to his mother, "At the end he thanked me for the golden memories of his childhood." In the weeks following his death, his website was reportedly "flooded" with over 14,000 messages from fans paying tribute. Schuldiner was cremated. According to MTV coverage his funeral was attended by Mike Patton, Metallica's former bassist Jason Newsted, Max Cavalera, King Diamond, Ville Valo, Trey Azagthoth, Glen Benton, Tim Aymar from Control Denied, and all the former and active members of Death.

=== Aftermath and estate ===
After losing Frank, he worried so about what it would do to the three of us - Beth, Christopher and myself - to lose him. I promised him we would do the best we could if he were to lose that fight and that is what we are trying to do, keep that promise. Chuck was the one who never gave up, who instilled hope and love in those all around him and he never cursed fate. Chuck's steadfast hope for the future and his family, friends, and the many fans who wrote to him sustained him.

— Jane Schuldiner (November 8, 2006)

Former manager Eric Greif handled Schuldiner's estate as president of Perseverance Holdings.

A legal battle began from the time of Schuldiner's death on the settlement of the rights to the partially completed second Control Denied album, When Man and Machine Collide, which was recorded in 2000–2001. Demos of these unreleased Control Denied songs, as well as early Death demos and live Death recordings from 1990, were released in the Zero Tolerance two-part compilation bootlegs by the Dutch Hammerheart Holdings company. The matter was settled in November 2009. There was a meeting held by guitarist Shannon Hamm and producer Jim Morris at Morrisound in 2012. By 2016, former Death manager Eric Greif indicated that the album would not be completed.

Tribute concerts have been coordinated or funded by his family and various Death tribute groups internationally. Guitarist James Murphy announced he would release a Chuck Schuldiner tribute album to commemorate his lasting mark on the metal community and Schuldiner's family publicly offered support for Murphy's effort, though it has never materialized. In December 2022, Murphy talked about the reasoning why the project was placed on hold. Schuldiner's sister Beth confirmed via her YouTube channel that Death: Live in Japan, a behind the scenes Death video, as well as a potential boxset containing all of Schuldiner's works including some exclusive copies of handwritten notes by Schuldiner are in the works via Relapse Records. The Live in Japan release was cancelled as it was planned without the "knowledge" of Chuck's estate. Schuldiner estate lawyer Eric Greif held a charity Chuck Schuldiner Birthday Bash in Calgary, Alberta, May 13, 2011, featuring speeches by Greif and former Death guitarist Paul Masvidal, as well as bands performing Schuldiner's music.

Schuldiner's mother Jane Schuldiner continues to interact with his fans, telling Guitar World in 2006, "I receive many emails from young fans 11 years old and up. Just think, another generation is discovering Chuck's music. He would be so proud."

== Artistry ==
Schuldiner's vocals are considered to be more intelligible than many other death metal vocalists. According to Graham Hartmann of Loudwire: "While keeping his vocals gritty and vicious in delivery, the man annunciated [sic] every syllable, painting a detailed picture of the visuals he was putting forth through his music." Despite this, Chuck Schuldiner's vocals are characterized as a "throat shredding death rattle" by Joe DiVita while writing for the same publication. In the early days of Death, he employed a "deep, raspy" death growl vocal technique, which his mother claims "just came naturally" with playing aggressive music. Sam Sodomsky of Pitchfork described Schuldiner's vocal tone as "less guttural than what death metal vocals would become and more abrasive than the thrash metal that inspired him [...] like fire tearing through piles of leaves." DiVita assessed, "Early on, his ravenous approach was biting and mid-ranged, arcing with eviscerating highs that have been imitated by countless others [...] Later on, Schuldiner's voice would become even more intelligible, marked by higher tones." Schuldiner said in 1993 that "it takes a lot of energy and a lot of throat abuse to get through a show."

By 1999, he emphasized that he would retire Death if Control Denied "took off", stating that "I hate screaming. I just don't like it any more."

Schuldiner's lyrics on early Death releases drew on slasher film-style graphic violence. On later releases by the band, his lyrics evolved towards a more progressive and philosophical style, characterized by "thought-provoking messages". Author Ian Christe assessed: "When Schuldiner sang about death and decay, he managed to make morbidity sound personal. That still sets him apart from almost anyone else in all of extreme music." Schuldiner explained that he had grown tired of the usual Satanic and horror-themed lyrical content of his contemporaries in the genre, and expressed a desire to explore "real life horrors" in his lyrics. To quash any implication of religion, Schuldiner adjusted the original Death logo (which was designed by the original vocalist and drummer, Kam Lee), swapping the inverted cross with a regular "T" in 1991.

Schuldiner was mostly self-taught as a guitarist. In 1993, he expressed a disinterest in music theory: "I know enough about what I'm playing to memorize the scales and things, but I have no idea how you would label them. As long as I can play it, memorize it and apply it, I don't need to know what you call it." His style was described by Control Denied drummer Christy as a "mix of melody, technicality and brutality". His guitar solos have been called "emotionally aching" and have been noted for their high pitch.

Schuldiner has been described as a "perfectionist" by some who had known him and worked with him.

== Equipment ==
Schuldiner used a simple setup. For most of his career, his main guitar was a B.C. Rich Stealth fitted with a single DiMarzio X2N bridge pickup. For his amplification, Schuldiner used a Marshall Valvestate 8100 head played through a Marshall Valvestate VS412 cabinet. He used 10-46 gauge GHS Boomers strings, and Dunlop Tortex Standard .88mm picks. Schuldiner used very little effects except for a chorus effect during his solos.

== Legacy ==
Schuldiner is often referred to as "The Godfather of death metal". Forbes said "Extreme music, more specifically the death metal sub-genre, would cease to exist without the musical brilliance of Chuck Schuldiner" [...] within metal, there are few musicians who've shown such a profound prowess for technical and melodic guitar playing, all while playing music as extreme as death metal." Bradley Torreano of AllMusic said "Chuck Schuldiner's brand of heavy metal opened the doors for a genre that had only been hinted at by efforts from Slayer and Venom."

Schuldiner himself was not fond of the title, remarking that "I don't think I should take the credits for this death metal stuff. I'm just a guy from a band, and I think Death is a metal band." He instead contended that Venom and Motörhead were the true progenitors of the style.

Schuldiner has also been credited with pushing the boundaries of death metal and influencing the development of several subgenres. According to Blabbermouth, Schuldiner "[spawned] a new generation of metallers open to the concept that brutality and melody could work together [...] there aren't too many other individual musicians in metal's history who did more to kick down those genre walls and make it okay to be unique." Jonathan Horsley of MusicRadar said "Schuldiner's vision proved death metal could grow its brain and process high-minded concepts without taking all the danger out of the sound," and proved the genre "could tackle philosophical issues, too." He has been called one of the "best" lyricists in the history of the genre.

In January 2001, Mahyar Dean, an Iranian metal guitarist/musician, wrote Death, a book about Death and Schuldiner's poems. The book includes bilingual lyrics and many articles about the band. The book was sent through the site keepers of emptywords.org to Schuldiner, who in his words was "truly blown away and honored by the obvious work and devotion he put into bringing the book to life".

In November 2025, Born Human: The Life And Music Of Death's Chuck Schuldiner was issued via Decibel Books. The book was fully authorized by the Schuldiner family and was authored by American writer David E. Gehlke. The book "features exclusive interviews, contributions, stunning new Ed Repka cover art and previously unreleased, hand-selected photographs from those who knew Chuck best."

== Personal life and views ==
Schuldiner's father is Jewish, and his mother is a Christian. According to his mother, as parents, they exposed him to the cultural traditions of both religious backgrounds, and he and his brother "ended up being the best of both". On the topic of the afterlife, heaven and hell, he stated the belief that everyday life on earth was hell in itself, arguing that humans were figuratively the real "demons", rather than literal evil supernatural beings "flying around with horns."

Schuldiner was openly against hard drugs; he is quoted as saying, "I've tripped several times. That's all because I don't like the hard drugs. And my only drugs are alcohol and grass."

Despite the grim nature of his band, Schuldiner has been quoted as saying he's "a lover of life ... friendship, and animals" and that "I would like to live forever if it were possible".

== Discography ==
=== With Death ===
- Scream Bloody Gore (1987)
- Leprosy (1988)
- Spiritual Healing (1990)
- Human (1991)
- Individual Thought Patterns (1993)
- Symbolic (1995)
- The Sound of Perseverance (1998)

=== With Voodoocult ===
- Jesus Killing Machine (1994)

=== With Control Denied ===
- The Fragile Art of Existence (1999)

== See also ==
- Honorific nicknames in popular music
- Extreme metal genres
