= Torn from the Grave =

Compilation album by Autopsy
- Released: 2001
- Recorded: 1987–1995
- Genre: Death metal
- Length: 70:39
- Label: Peaceville Records
- Producer: Tim Daly, Jonathan Burnside, John Marshall

Autopsy chronology
| Shitfun (1995) | Torn from the Grave (2001) | The Tomb Within (2010) |

Torn from the Grave is a compilation album by death metal band Autopsy.

It was given a rating of eight by Chronicles of Chaos.

== Track listing ==
From Severed Survival
1. "Charred Remains" - 3:38
2. "Disembowel" - 4:03
3. "Gasping for Air" - 3:18
4. "Severed Survival" - 3:26
From Critical Madness demo
5. "Ridden with Disease" - 4:40
Previously unreleased track
6. "Service for a Vacant Coffin" (Live) - 3:30

Recorded live in Bramberg, Germany, 1990

From Retribution for the Dead
7. "Retribution for the Dead" - 3:53
Previously unreleased track
8. "Robbing the Grave" (Live) - 3:52

Recorded live at The Waters Club, San Pedro, CA, March 30, 1991

From Mental Funeral
9. "Twisted Mass of Burnt Decay" - 2:14
10. "Fleshcrawl" - 0:35
11. "Torn from the Womb" - 3:18
12. "Slaughterday" - 4:04
13. "Dark Crusade" - 3:54
14. "Mental Funeral" - 0:36
From Fiend for Blood

15. "Fiend for Blood" - 0:25

16. "Squeal Like A Pig" - 3:42
From the compilation Peaceville Vol. 4
17. "Funereality" - 2:51
From Acts of the Unspeakable
18. "An Act of the Unspeakable" - 2:25
19. "Frozen with Fear" - 0:30
20. "Spinal Extraction" - 0:21
21. "Death Twitch" - 2:13
22. "Walls of the Coffin" - 1:17
Previously unreleased track
23. "Shiteater" (Live) - 2:15

Recorded live at Bonnie's, New Jersey

From Shitfun
24. "Humiliate your Corpse" - 3:27
25. "Brain Damage" - 1:17
26. "Blood Orgy" - 3:23
27. "Bowel Ripper" - 1:12
