= Chris Reifert =

American drummer (born 1968)

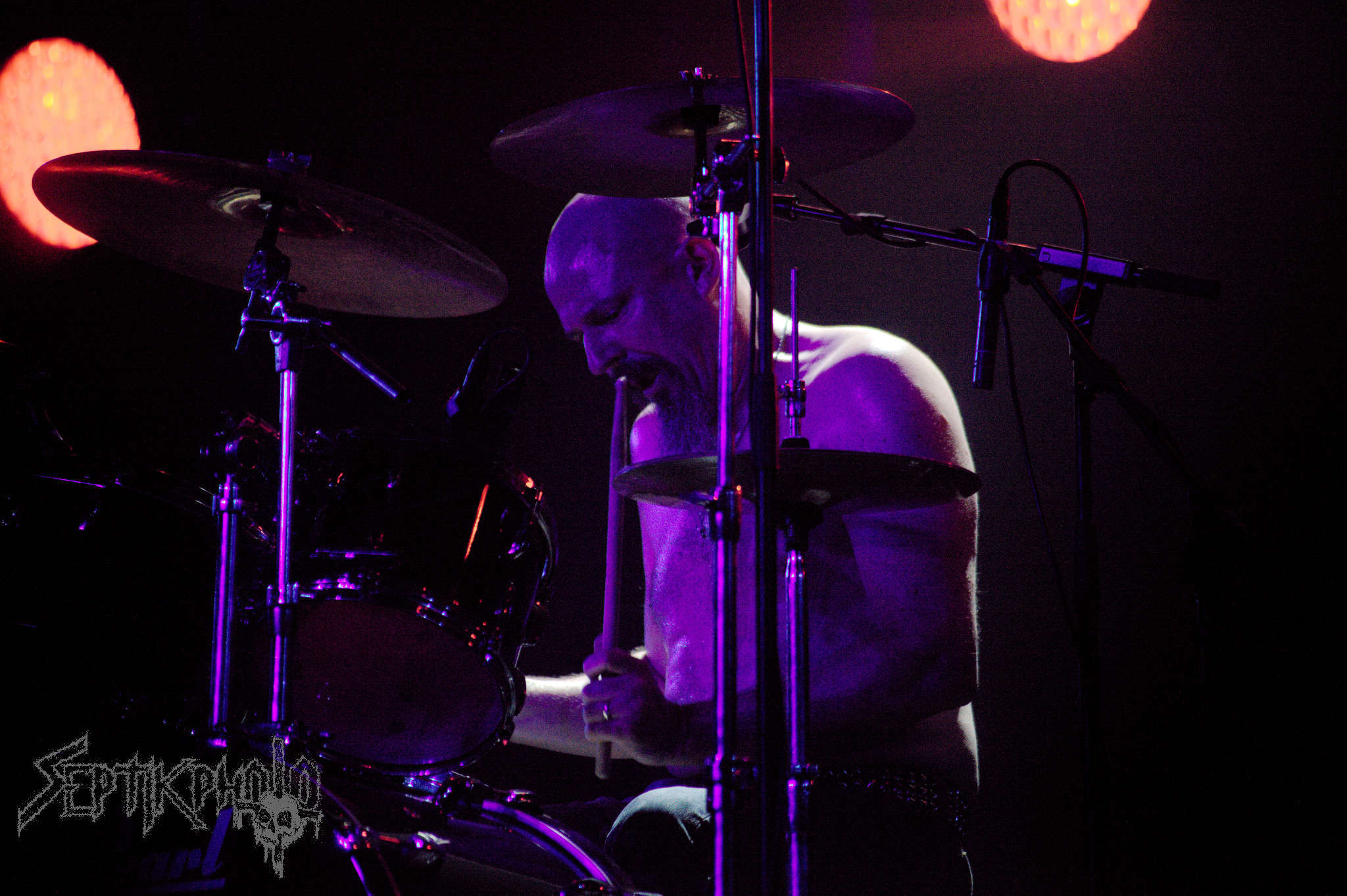
- Reifert in 2016

Background information
- Born: Chris Reifert; February 23, 1968 (age 58)
- Genres: Death metal; death-doom; hardcore punk
- Occupation: Musician
- Instruments: Drums, vocals, bass, guitar
- Years active: 1985–present
- Labels: Peaceville Records, Necroharmonic Productions, Tyrant Syndicate
- Member of: Autopsy
- Formerly of: Death, Abscess

Chris Reifert (born February 23, 1968) is an American death metal musician. He is the founder, vocalist, and drummer of Autopsy. He was previously a founding member of both Abscess and Death, playing drums on Death's debut Scream Bloody Gore.

== Career ==
Reifert had a friend who was a DJ at a local radio station that was running an ad for musicians “Musicians needed for the new lineup of Death, or something like that.” He heard about it before the ad had aired. He was a fan of the band, and had already been collecting the band’s demos, and initially doubted it could have been the same Death that he was familiar with. Reifert responded to the ad, and him and Schuldiner began creating music with one another. Reifert played drums on the Death debut album, Scream Bloody Gore. After parting ways with Chuck Schuldiner in 1987, Reifert elected to remain in the San Francisco Bay Area, forming Autopsy in 1987. In his own band, he played not only drums but performed the vocals as well. He said he started singing out of necessity after trying several friends out on vocals. Cutler and Reifert started off sharing vocal duties before Cutler eventually grew tired of it, and Reifert assumed lead vocal duties. He describes singing and drumming as a “workout.” After several albums, Autopsy split up in 1995 and Reifert and bandmate Danny Coralles began playing in their side-project, Abscess full-time. Autopsy reformed after Abscess' dissolution in 2010.

Chris Reifert is also known for his many side-projects, including the Ravenous, Doomed, Eat My Fuk, and Violation Wound. He has also performed guest vocals on Machetazo's Sinfonias del Terror Ciego and the Autopsy-inspired Murder Squad's Ravenous, Murderous, with further guest appearances for Immortal Fate, Nuclear Death, and "Cathedral of the Damned" on Cathedral's final album, The Last Spire.

== Artistry ==
Reifert is a pioneer of the death-doom fusion genre. Although his music is more death metal than doom metal, he is one of the first musicians known to have combined the two styles. According to Joe Davita of Loudwire: "His pus-spewing, swallowed vomit grunts and groans are fit for straightjackets and a gurney, prowling flickering halls repeating words of torture and grisly ends."

He is also known for his album cover art. His interviews are noted for his sharp wit and off-the-wall humor.

Reifert has named his early influences as Slayer, Terrorizer, Master, Death, Possessed, Black Sabbath, Pentagram, Candlemass, Witchfinder General, Trouble, Saint Vitus, Frank Marino, Robin Trower, Cream and Alice Cooper.

== Bands ==
- Burnt Offering – drums
- Death – drums
- Autopsy – drums, vocals, bass
- Abscess – drums, vocals, bass
- The Ravenous – drums, guitar, vocals
- Eat My Fuk – drums, vocals
- Doomed – drums
- Violation Wound – guitar, vocals
- Painted Doll – drums, guitar, bass
- Static Abyss - drums, vocals

== Discography ==
=== Burnt Offering ===
- Demo 1 (1985)
- Frightmare (1985)

=== Death ===
- Mutilation demo (1986)
- Scream Bloody Gore (1987)

=== Autopsy ===
- 1987 Demo (1987)
- Critical Madness (1988)
- Severed Survival (1989)
- Retribution for the Dead (1991)
- Mental Funeral (1991)
- Fiend for Blood (1992)
- Acts of the Unspeakable (1992)
- Shitfun (1995)
- Ridden with Disease (2000)
- Torn from the Grave (2001)
- Dead as Fuck (2004)
- Horrific Obsession (2009)
- The Tomb Within (2010)
- Macabre Eternal (2011)
- All Tomorrow's Funerals (2012)
- The Headless Ritual (2013)
- Tourniquets, Hacksaws & Graves (2014)
- Skull Grinder (2015)
- Morbidity Triumphant (2022)
- Ashes, Organs, Blood and Crypts (2023)

=== Doomed ===
- Haematomania (1991)
- Broken (1993)

=== Abscess ===
- Abscess (1994)
- Raw, Sick, and Brutal Noize (1994)
- Crawled Up from the Sewer (1995)
- Filthy Fucking Freaks (1995)
- Urine Junkies (1995)
- Seminal Vampires and Maggot Men (1996)
- Open Wound (1998)
- Throbbing Black Werebeast (1998)
- Tormented (2000)
- Split with Deranged (2001)
- Split with Machetazo (2001)
- Through the Cracks of Death (2002)
- Thirst for Blood, Hunger for Flesh (2004)
- Damned and Mummified (2004)
- Split with Bloodred Bacteria (2005)
- Horrorhammer (2007)
- Split with Bonesaw (2008)
- Dawn of Inhumanity (2010)

=== The Ravenous ===
- Assembled in Blasphemy (2000)
- Three on a Meathook (2002)
- Blood Delirium (2004)

=== Eat My Fuk ===
- Wet Slit and a Bottle of Whiskey (2003)
- Fuk You, It's Eat My Fuk! (2009)

=== Violation Wound ===
- Violation Wound (2014)
- Broken Idol/Elimination Time (2015)
- Open Up And Burn (2016)
- With Man In Charge (2018)

=== Painted Doll ===
- Painted Doll (2018)
- How to Draw Fire (2020)

=== Static Abyss ===
- Labyrinth Of Veins (2022)
- Aborted From Reality (2023)

=== Cathedral ===
- The Last Spire (2013), backing guest vocals on track "Cathedral Of The Damned"

=== Bloodbath ===
- Grand Morbid Funeral (2014), backing guest vocals on track "Grand Morbid Funeral"

=== Teitanblood ===
- Death (2014), guest vocals on track "Burning in Damnation Fires"

=== Morbosidad ===
- Tortura (2014), guest vocals on track "Batalla de pecados"

== Filmography ==
- Autopsy – Dark Crusades (2006)
- Death - Death by Metal (2016)
