= Macabre Eternal =

Studio album by Autopsy
- Released: May 16, 2011
- Recorded: 2010
- Genre: Death metal; death-doom
- Length: 65:27
- Label: Peaceville Records
- Producer: Adam Munoz

Autopsy chronology
The Tomb Within (2010)	Macabre Eternal (2011)	The Headless Ritual (2013)

Professional ratings
Review scores
Source	Rating
AllMusic	4.5/5 stars

Macabre Eternal is the fifth album by the American death metal band Autopsy, released on May 16, 2011, on the label Peaceville Records. It is the first studio album Autopsy have released after their 1995 disbandment and 2009 reunion. The first album to feature bassist Joe Trevisano. It is also the first album since 1989's Severed Survival not to feature any short tracks.

== Background ==
After Autopsy disbanded in 1995, its leaders Chris Reifert and Danny Coralles resurfaced for the hardcore punk-influenced death metal supergroup Abscess, also featuring Clint Bower on guitar and vocals and another former Autopsy member Frank "Freeway" Migliore on bass. The group released their debut album, Seminal Vampires and Maggot Men, before Migliore left the band in 1997. Abscess continued on with new bassist Joe Allen and released more well-received albums before splitting up in June 2010. After Coralles said in a May 2004 interview that an Autopsy reunion would never happen, the members of Autopsy reunited in the studio in September 2008 to record two new tracks (that are very similar to the old material of Autopsy) for the special edition of their 1989 classic debut Severed Survival, which was released on February 23, 2009. Following the release of the album's reissue, the reunited Autopsy made their debut performing live for the first time in over a decade at Maryland Deathfest. There, the band unveiled new member Dan Lilker, who took over bass duties.

On June 2, 2010, the day Abscess announced their breakup, Autopsy announced that they had "come to the solid realization that the time is now right to resume their mission of gore soaked death metal brutality and to fulfill this mission with maximum intensity." The band also revealed that a new EP and new studio album (Autopsy's first in 16 years) were in the works.

== Track listing ==
No.	Title	Length
1.	"Hand of Darkness"	5:19
2.	"Dirty Gore Whore"	5:45
3.	"Always About to Die"	5:15
4.	"Macabre Eternal"	4:39
5.	"Deliver Me from Sanity"	4:24
6.	"Seeds of the Doomed"	5:26
7.	"Bridge of Bones"	4:46
8.	"Born Undead"	4:00
9.	"Sewn Into One"	6:31
10.	"Bludgeoned and Brained"	4:09
11.	"Sadistic Gratification"	11:33
12.	"Spill My Blood"	3:40
Total length:		65:27

== Personnel ==
Autopsy

- Chris Reifert – drums, vocals
- Danny Coralles – guitar
- Eric Cutler – guitar, vocals on "Dirty Gore Whore", "Sadistic Graftification" and "Spill My Blood"
- Joe Trevisano – bass

Additional personnel

- Rakhel "The Sheep" Hartz-Alvarez – tortured screams on "Sadistic Gratification"

Production

- Wes Benscoter – cover art
- Adam Munoz – producer, recording, mixing
- Jesse Badia – engineering assistant
- Ken Lee – mastering
- Raymond Ahner – photography
- Matthew Vickerstaff – layout
