= Tourniquets, Hacksaws and Graves =

Studio album by Autopsy
- Released: April 21, 2014
- Recorded: April and September, 2013
- Studio: Fantasy Studios, California
- Genre: Death metal; death-doom
- Length: 49:00
- Label: Peaceville Records
- Producer: Autopsy, Adam Munoz

Autopsy chronology
The Headless Ritual (2013)	Tourniquets, Hacksaws and Graves (2014)	Skull Grinder (2015)

Tourniquets, Hacksaws and Graves is the seventh studio album by American death metal band Autopsy. It was released in April 2014. As with all Autopsy albums, it was released through Peaceville Records, and as with all albums since the band's 2009 reunion, it is produced by Adam Munoz alongside the band. It is the last album to feature bassist Joe Trevisano.

== Background ==
Autopsy released their sixth studio album, The Headless Ritual in June 2013. Building on the leftover tracks from the recording sessions that April that produced the Headless Ritual album the band returned to the studio in September to complete work on their seventh effort. The band said of the album "Tourniquets tighten... hacksaws rip... graves are filled...This is Autopsy, this is death metal. With the stench of 'The Headless Ritual' still permeating the befouled air, Autopsy has once again come for your very metal soul with their newest blood-soaked homage to all things dark, twisted and horrific... once again, bone-crushingly heavy nightmares await. 'Tourniquets, Hacksaws And Graves' will awaken the most depraved part of the coldest zombie's stare... blood will flow, brains will be destroyed, coffin lids will be opened."

== Track listing ==
Tourniquets, Hacksaws and Graves track listing
No.	Title	Length
1.	"Savagery"	2:22
2.	"King of Flesh Ripped"	4:43
3.	"Tourniquets, Hacksaws and Graves"	4:03
4.	"The Howling Dead"	5:59
5.	"After the Cutting"	3:37
6.	"Forever Hungry"	4:40
7.	"Teeth of the Shadow Horde"	3:28
8.	"All Shall Bleed" (instrumental)	1:12
9.	"Deep Crimson Dreaming"	5:13
10.	"Parasitic Eye"	4:10
11.	"Burial"	3:45
12.	"Autopsy"	5:48
Total length:		49:00

== Personnel ==
Credits adapted from liner notes.

Autopsy

- Danny Coralles – guitars, piano (track 9), backing vocals (track 12)
- Eric Cutler – guitars, lead vocals (track 6), backing vocals (track 12)
- Chris Reifert – drums, lead vocals (all but 6 and 8), backing vocals (track 12)
- Joe Trevisano – bass, backing vocals (track 12)

Additional personnel

- Don Hopper – backing vocals (track 12)
- Ron Falcon – backing vocals (track 12)
- Aaron Cronon – backing vocals (track 12)
- Ken Lee – mastering
- Courtney McCutcheon – photography
- Adam Munoz – recording, mixing, producer
- Wes Benscoter – artwork
