= Ravenous =

Ravenous may refer to:

== Film ==
- Ravenous (1999 film), a film directed by Antonia Bird
- Ravenous (2017 film), a French-language Canadian horror film directed by Robin Aubert

== Music ==
=== Albums ===
- Ravenous (God Dethroned album), 2000
- Ravenous (Wolf album), 2009
- Ravenous (soundtrack), from the 1999 film, by Damon Albarn and Michael Nyman

=== Other ===
- Ravenous, a German synthpop band associated with Funker Vogt
- The Ravenous, an American death metal band associated with Chris Reifert
- "Ravenous", a song by Atreyu from Congregation of the Damned
- "Ravenous", a song by Killswitch Engage from Atonement
- Ravenous Records, a British record label

== Other media ==
- Ravenous (audio drama), based on the British television series Doctor Who
- The Ravenous, a 2003 horror novel by T. M. Gray
- Ravenous: How to Get Ourselves and Our Planet Into Shape, a 2023 book by Henry Dimbleby
- Metroid Ravenous, an upcoming video game
