= Autopsy (band) =

American death metal band

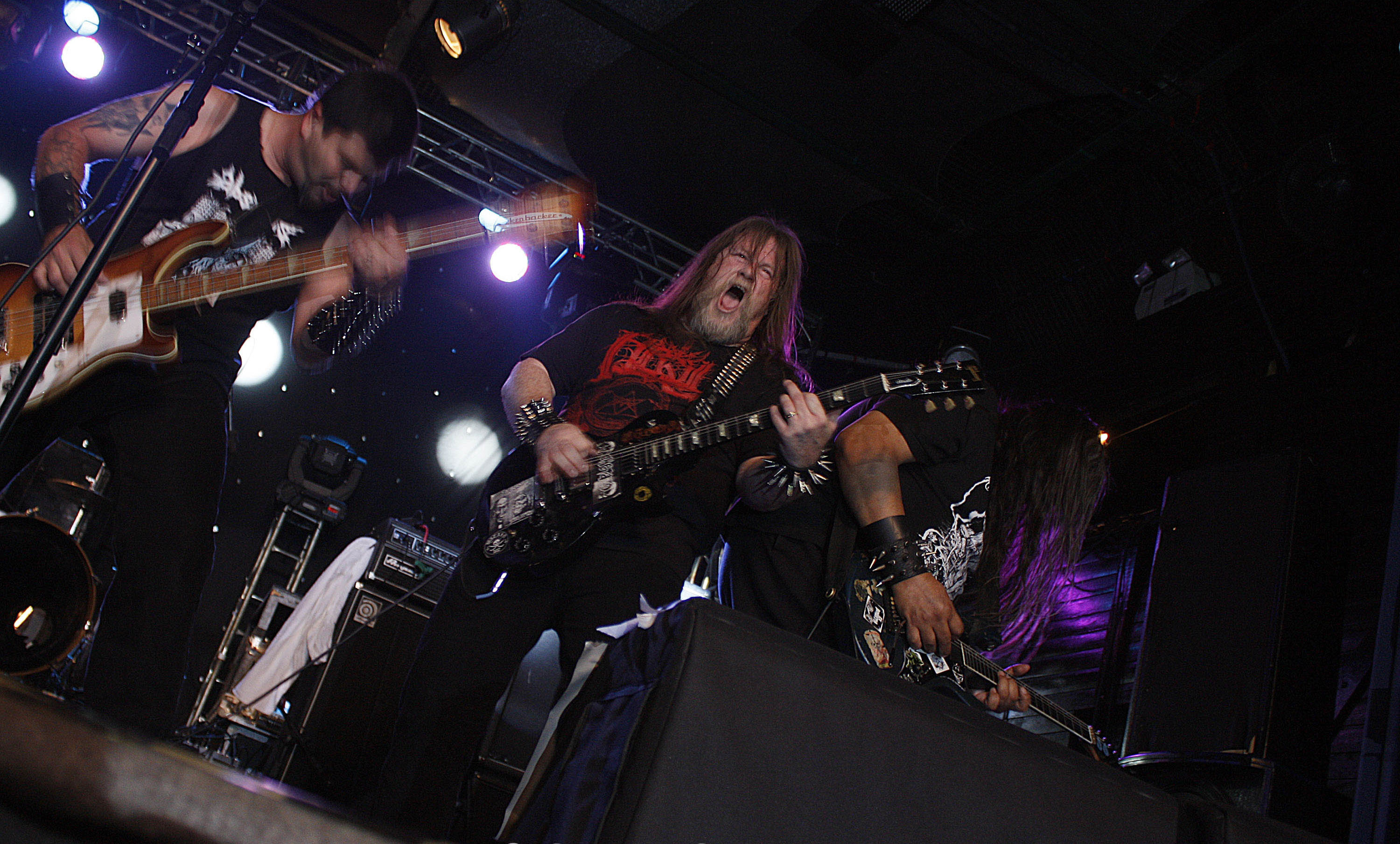
- Autopsy at Setembro Negro 2012

Background information
- Origin: Contra Costa County, California, U.S.
- Genres: Death metal; death-doom
- Years active: 1987–1995; 2008–present
- Label: Peaceville
- Members: Chris Reifert; Eric Cutler; Danny Coralles; Greg Wilkinson
- Past members: Eric Eigard; Steve Cutler; Ken Sorvari; Josh Barohn; Freeway Migliore; Dan Lilker; Joe Trevisano

Autopsy is an American death metal band formed in Contra Costa County, California, in 1987 by Chris Reifert and Eric Cutler, after Reifert departed from Death following the release of the demo Mutilation (1986) and their debut album, Scream Bloody Gore (1987). The group disbanded in 1995 and reunited in 2008. The band's hometown is in Concord, California.

The band, along with Death, Possessed, Obituary, Deicide and Morbid Angel are regarded as among the founders of modern death metal. Their first two albums, Severed Survival (1989) and Mental Funeral (1991), are regarded as genre-defining landmarks, helping to birth death metal and the associated genre of death-doom. They have released nine studio albums.

== History ==
=== Initial career ===
Chris Reifert and Eric Cutler formed Autopsy in August 1987, shortly after Reifert's departure from Death. The band recorded a demo that year, Demo '87. Danny Coralles joined in 1988 immediately before recording their second demo, Critical Madness, and along with Reifert and Cutler, would be a constant in the band's lineup. The band signed to Peaceville Records and released their debut album, Severed Survival, in 1989. These early recordings featured a pioneering death metal style with a slower, doom metal-influenced sound.

Autopsy participated in the "Blood Brothers tour" in Europe with Bolt Thrower and Pestilence in 1990. The three bands took turns headlining. Reifert recalled thinking the name of the tour, which the promoter had come up with, was "kind of dumb." He said, "I remember they made a tour shirt that was equally dumb. We were like, 'Oh, yeah, happy flying skulls...' That was a stupid shirt. So that was definitely not our doing, any of that stuff." Reifert claimed that the band received no payment for the shows, and that the promoter "ran off to Thailand with the money," never to be seen by them again.

The next full-length, Mental Funeral, continued the death-doom style of Severed Survival and has since been cited by other death metal musicians as influential. Having completed a successful European tour after Mental Funeral, the band reentered the studio to record the Fiend for Blood EP, which was followed by their third full-length, Acts of the Unspeakable, which featured shorter songs and a more grindcore-influenced sound. A difficult US tour in 1993 led to Autopsy disbanding after recording a final album. Shitfun, released in early 1995, was influenced by hardcore punk and would prepare fans for Abscess, previously a side-project of Danny Coralles and Chris Reifert, which would become their main band after Autopsy's demise.

Autopsy was featured in the 2005 music documentary Metal: A Headbanger's Journey when the film's narrator and star, Sam Dunn, read aloud a verse from the band's song "Charred Remains".

=== Reunion ===
After several years of speculation regarding an Autopsy reunion, and denial of the possibility, the band members briefly reunited in September 2008 to record two new tracks for the special edition of their 1989 debut Severed Survival. They later reconvened to play the Maryland Deathfest in 2010. After Abscess broke up in June 2010, Autopsy immediately announced that they had permanently reunited. They released The Tomb Within EP in September 2010, Macabre Eternal in 2011, Born Undead DVD in 2012, The Headless Ritual in 2013 and Tourniquets, Hacksaws and Graves in 2014. Autopsy released the EP Skullgrinder on November 27, 2015. They released the EP Puncturing the Grotesque on December 15, 2017.

In December 2021, the band announced they were working on a new album, which was tentatively due for release in 2022. On July 27, 2022, the band revealed their new album, Morbidity Triumphant, would be released on September 30. On August 31, 2023, Autopsy announced their ninth studio album, Ashes, Organs, Blood and Crypts, would be released on October 27. The band is expected to release their next album in 2027.

== Musical style and influences ==
Eduardo Rivadavia of AllMusic categorized Autopsy as a death metal band with "grindcore tendencies", and described their sound as a "caustic" fusion of thrash, doom and death metal. Autopsy's music alternates between rapid and slow passages, breaking from typical death metal fashion at the time of the genre's infancy. According to Chris Krovatin of Kerrang: "The band’s constant swing between noisy traditional racket and dissonant doom moved away from metal's beats-per-minute arms race and reveled in the bodily weirdness that was at the heart of the genre's growth throughout the '90s." According to Joe DaVita of Loudwire: "Autopsy represent the ugliest end of death metal’s spectrum. Horror-drenched leads clash with lumbering, reckless rhythms in a battle of death and doom."

Chris Reifert's drumming has been called "clunky" by online music magazine Invisible Oranges, which likened it to "the sound of a garbage bag hitting the side of a dumpster." As a vocalist, Reifert uses both screams and death growls in the band's music.

Autopsy has cited Trouble and Saint Vitus as early influences. Brandon Corsair of Invisible Oranges said: "That impossible-to-fake direct influence differentiates Autopsy from even other death metal bands at the time that had slower sections here and there, and the contrast makes their more ripping sections hit that much harder." The band also draws influence from punk rock, and is known for the "brutal simplicity" of its rhythm section.

The members of Autopsy are film fans, particularly "anything dark and gory", and hence, the band's lyrics draw on horror and slasher film-style violence. Guitarist Eric Cutler said the band's sound is "like a soundtrack for a horror movie". Chris Reifert recalled: "We would go to the video store and rent the goriest movies we could find and watch them over and over, rewinding the gore scenes several times in a row, cackling like maniacs. So, we couldn’t help but be influenced by them." Examples of films that have influenced the band's lyrics include Truth or Dare, Gates of Hell, Rawhead Rex, Hellraiser, and From Beyond.

== Legacy and impact ==
Along with fellow Bay Area band Possessed and Reifert's previous group Death, Autopsy have been considered a pioneering band in the death metal genre. Early bands such as Entombed, Dismember, Gorefest, Immolation, Cannibal Corpse and Deicide have all credited Autopsy as an influence in their sound. In addition, Autopsy have helped to pioneer death-doom.

== Band members ==
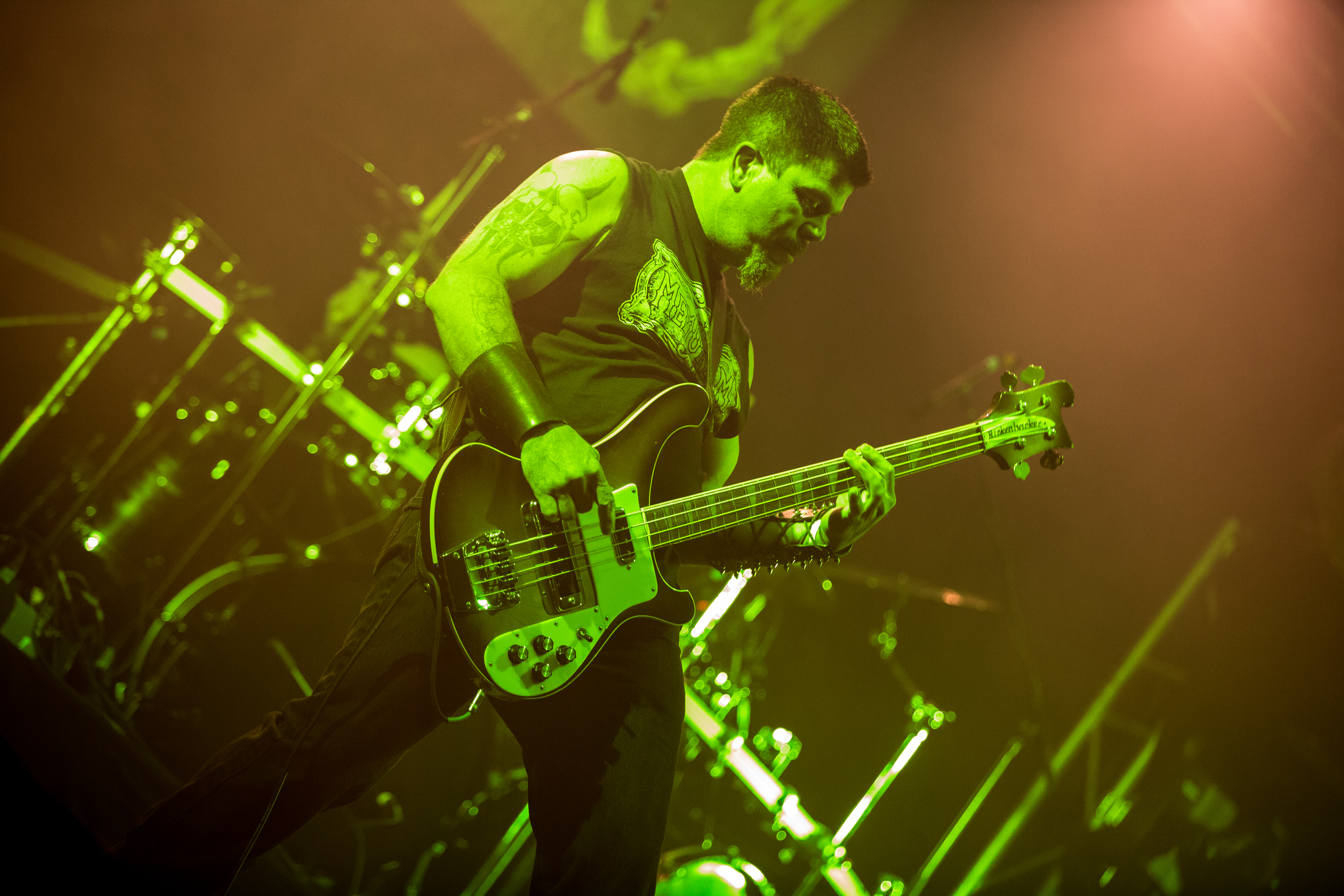
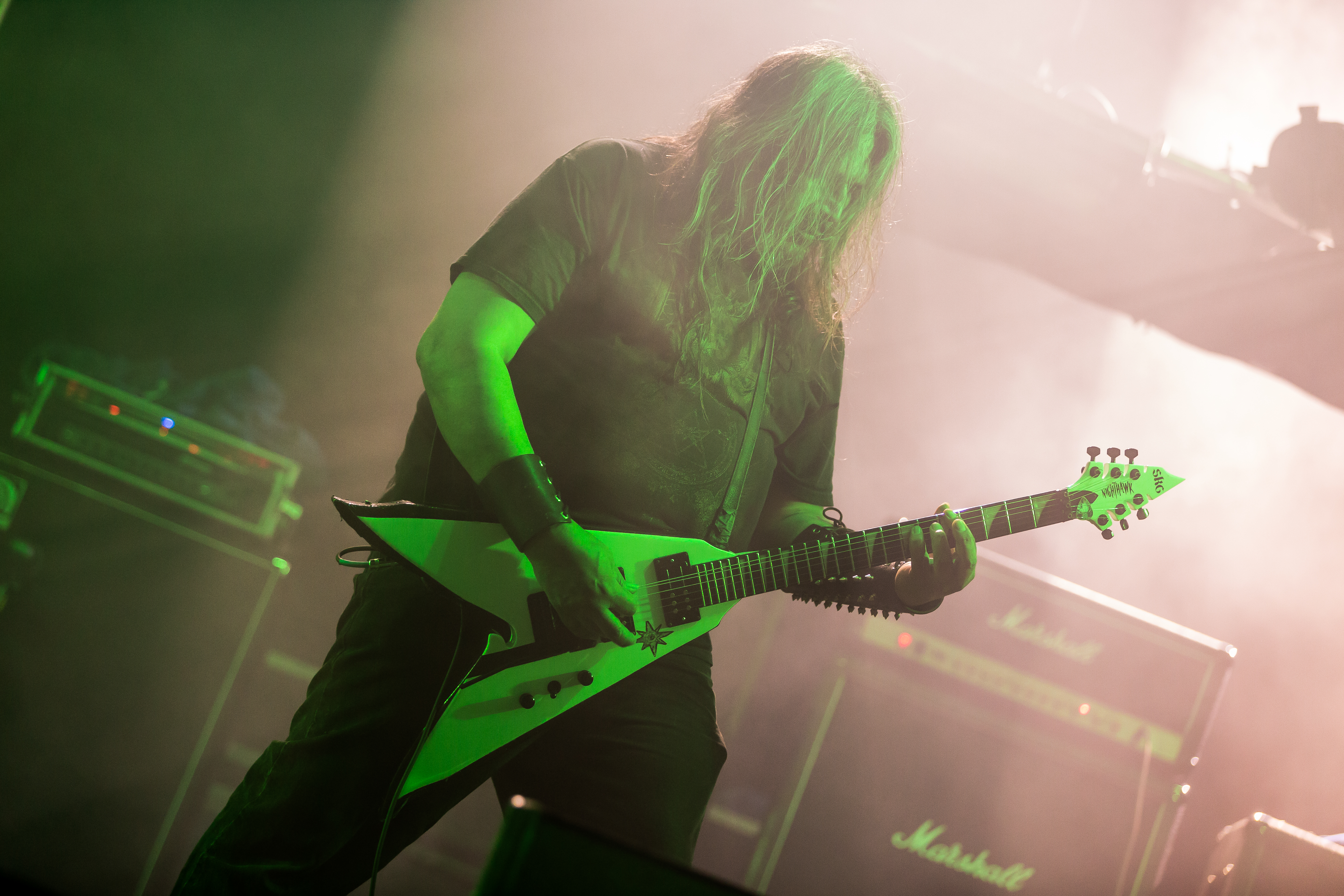
Autopsy at Party.San Metal Open Air 2017

=== Current members ===
- Chris Reifert – lead vocals, drums, percussion (1987–1995, 2009–present), bass (1988–1990, 2009–2010; in studio only)
- Eric Cutler – guitar, backing and occasional lead vocals (1987–1995, 2009–present), bass (1988–1990, 2009–2010)
- Danny Coralles – guitar (1988–1995, 2009–present), bass (1988–1990, 2009–2010; live only)
- Greg Wilkinson – bass (2021–present)

=== Former members ===
- Steve Cutler – bass (1990–1991)
- Josh Barohn – bass (1991–1993)
- Freeway Migliore – bass (1993–1995)
- Joe Trevisano – bass (2010–2021)

=== Session musicians ===
- Steve Di Giorgio – bass (1988–1989)
- Clint Bower – bass (1994–1995)

=== Live members ===
- Dan Lilker – bass (2009–2010)

== Discography ==
=== Studio albums ===
- Severed Survival (1989)
- Mental Funeral (1991)
- Acts of the Unspeakable (1992)
- Shitfun (1995)
- Macabre Eternal (2011)
- The Headless Ritual (2013)
- Tourniquets, Hacksaws and Graves (2014)
- Morbidity Triumphant (2022)
- Ashes, Organs, Blood and Crypts (2023)

=== EPs/singles ===
- Retribution for the Dead (1990)
- Fiend for Blood (1991)
- The Tomb Within (2010)
- Skull Grinder (2015)
- Puncturing the Grotesque (2017)

=== Live albums ===
- Tortured Moans of Agony (1998)
- Dead as Fuck (2004)
- Dark Crusades (2010)
- Live in Chicago (2020)

=== Demos ===
- 1987 Demo (1987)
- Critical Madness (1988)

=== Compilations ===
- Ridden with Disease (2000)
- Torn from the Grave (2001)
- All Tomorrow's Funerals (2012)
- Introducing Autopsy (2013)

=== Re-releases ===
- Severed Survival/Retribution for the Dead (1994)
- Acts of the Unspeakable/Fiend for Blood (2003)

== Filmography ==
- Dark Crusades (with liner notes and band interview by Joel McIver; Peaceville Records, 2006)
- Born Undead (produced by Jesse Davis; Peaceville Records, 2012)
