= Charred Remains =

Song by Autopsy

from the album Severed Survival
- Released: April 24, 1989
- Genre: Death metal
- Length: 3:40
- Songwriter: Chris Reifert
- Producers: Autopsy and John Marshall

"Charred Remains" is a song by American death metal band Autopsy, appearing as the opening track on their 1989 debut album Severed Survival. The song's music and lyrics were composed entirely by Autopsy drummer-vocalist Chris Reifert.

== Music and lyrics ==
AllMusic called the track "vicious" and said its instrumentation made use of "frenzied clip and razor-sharp riffing." The song's lyrics explore the topic of death by burning. Metal Injection said about the track: "Autopsy do not believe in foreplay. They like getting into the thick of things at the very outset." The site also said Autopsy "attacked the topic [of death] with real piss and vinegar."

== Reception and legacy ==
In 2016, Jack King of Metal Hammer included the track in his list of "10 metal songs perfect for your BBQ". He said the following: "So this is it. People have turned up, drank all your beer and eaten all your food. You’re left alone staring at the embers slowly fading under your grill, but what is left for you? You take a blackened burger that was left on the heat for too long, slightly drunk and wearing a silly apron, you finish off the charred remains." That same year, Metal Injection included the song in list of "The 10 Gnarliest Extreme Metal Lyrics".

In 2023, The Dallas Observer published a listicle titled "What Makes Music Extreme? Whatever It Is, Here Are 25 Songs That Capture It", in which the song was featured.
