= Thomas Russo =

Thomas or Tom Russo may refer to:

- Thomas A. Russo (born 1943), American lawyer
- Thom Russo (born 1969), American record producer
- Dr. Tom Russo, character in In the Flesh
- Tom Russo, editor of Next Generation
- Tom Russo, character in Killing Spree
- Tom Russo, UIC Flames men's basketball

== See also ==
- Thomas Rousseau, American far-right activist
