= Mental Funeral =

Studio album by Autopsy
- Released: April 22, 1991
- Recorded: November 20 – 26, 1990
- Studio: Different Fur, San Francisco, California, USA
- Genre: Death metal; death-doom
- Length: 37:54
- Label: Peaceville Records
- Producer: Autopsy; Paul "Hammy" Halmshaw

Autopsy chronology
Retribution for the Dead (1991)	Mental Funeral (1991)	Fiend for Blood (1991)

Mental Funeral is the second album by American death metal band Autopsy, released on April 22, 1991 by Peaceville Records. The album was recorded at Different Fur Studios in San Francisco, and the band has attested that very little audio mixing was done on the final product.

Continuing in a similar vein as the band's previous album, Severed Survival, the band combines death metal and doom metal. The album's music draws influence from extreme metal acts such as Bathory. Lyrically, the album explores themes such as necrophilia.

Although the album polarized listeners when it was first released, it has come to be considered one of the most influential albums in the history of the death metal genre.

== Background and recording ==
The album was recorded at Different Fur Studios in San Francisco. The band described the album's recording process as having a "party atmosphere", and claim to have consumed copious amounts of alcohol and cannabis during its recording process. Chris Reifert said, "There were 18 of us there or something [...] we did all things we were not supposed to do while making a record it seems." The band was satisfied with most of the tones achieved during pre-production, and little mixing was required for the final product.

== Music and lyrics ==
Autopsy's sound on Mental Funeral has been described as "lumbering, unholy, and totally gross." Its styles have been categorized as death metal, death-doom and grindcore. Autopsy drummer and vocalist Chris Reifert believes the album feels "a little psychedelic [...] but without sound effects or anything like that." He claimed that the interlude riff in "In The Grip of Winter" was "[directly stolen]" from “Eskimo” by The Residents, and said he "just switched the notes a little bit". He said the main riff in “Destined to Fester” drew influence from “Call From the Grave” by Bathory.

Brandon Corsair of Invisible Oranges said "each song contains within it the potential to completely go off the rails with speed and aggression or to slow to a painful dirge". The lead guitar stylings of Eric Cutler and Danny Coralles on the album have been described as "agile" and "melodic." The album's rhythm guitars have been described as "savage" and "remorseless." The album's song structures have been described as being "never easy to predict."

Lyrically, the album explores themes including necrophilia. Chris Reifert's vocal performance has been characterized as employing "bowel-vacating croaks" and "spleen-bursting shrieks."

== Artwork ==
Chris Krovatin of Kerrang said: "It’s rare that an album sounds so much like the image on its cover," further commenting that it was, "Lumbering, unholy, and gross".

== Reception and legacy ==
Professional ratings
Review scores
Source	Rating
AllMusic	3.5/5 stars

Publications such as Decibel cite Mental Funeral as one of the most important death metal albums in the history of the genre. The album divided listeners upon release. Eduardo Rivadavia of AllMusic wrote: "Sadly, while it won over as many fans as it pissed off upon release, Mental Funeral arguably confused an even greater number of consumers, turning Autopsy into death metal's ultimate love/hate band, the one no one seemed able to agree on." In 2021, drummer-vocalist Chris Reifert spoke of Mental Funeral: "I’m stoked that people still like it 30 years later. That’s pretty nuts. Otherwise looking back, it’s a pretty strange and dark record. Not that all death metal records aren’t dark but it has a unique atmosphere about it that came about without a preconceived notion of what we were doing. I’m going to chalk it up as accidental magic."

== Track listing ==
All lyrics are written by Chris Reifert, except "Slaughterday" by Eric Cutler; all music is composed by Autopsy.

No.	Title	Length
1.	"Twisted Mass of Burnt Decay"	2:15
2.	"In the Grip of Winter"	4:08
3.	"Fleshcrawl"	0:36
4.	"Torn from the Womb"	3:19
5.	"Slaughterday"	4:04
6.	"Dead"	3:18
7.	"Robbing the Grave"	4:20
8.	"Hole in the Head"	6:03
9.	"Destined to Fester"	4:34
10.	"Bonesaw"	0:45
11.	"Dark Crusade"	3:55
12.	"Mental Funeral"	0:37
Total length:		37:54

== Personnel ==
Autopsy

- Chris Reifert – vocals, drums
- Danny Coralles – guitar
- Eric Cutler – guitar, vocals on "Slaughterday"
- Steve Cutler – bass

Production

- Recorded November 20–26, 1990 at Different Fur, San Francisco, California, USA
- Produced by Autopsy and Hammy
- Engineered by Ron Rigler
- Cover art by Kev Walker
