= The Headless Ritual =

Studio album by Autopsy
- Released: June 24, 2013
- Recorded: April 2013; Fantasy Studios; California
- Genre: Death metal; death-doom
- Length: 44:15
- Label: Peaceville Records
- Producer: Autopsy, Adam Munoz

Autopsy chronology
Macabre Eternal (2011)	The Headless Ritual (2013)	Tourniquets, Hacksaws and Graves (2014)

The Headless Ritual is the sixth studio album by Autopsy, released in 2013 through Peaceville Records. It is the second album since the band's 2009 reunion.

== Background ==
Autopsy reunited in 2009, and released Macabre Eternal in May 2011, toured and released the Born Undead DVD in 2012. Autopsy announced on October 23, 2012 that they were preparing to enter the studio, saying in a press release that the album would be their "heaviest, darkest and most devastating album to date." They also predicted a mid-2013 release, and recorded the album in early April 2013. It would be the second album to feature the reunion lineup of Chris Reifert, Eric Cutler, Danny Coralles and Joe Trevisano.

== Track listing ==
All lyrics are written by Chris Reifert, except where noted.

No.	Title	Lyrics	Music	Length
1.	"Slaughter at Beast House"		Eric Cutler	6:33
2.	"Mangled Far Below"		Joe Trevisano	3:37
3.	"She Is a Funeral"		Reifert	7:32
4.	"Coffin Crawlers"		Danny Coralles	4:32
5.	"When Hammer Meets Bone"		Reifert	5:34
6.	"Thorns and Ashes"		Reifert	1:45
7.	"Arch Cadaver"		Coralles	4:22
8.	"Flesh Turns to Dust"		Cutler, Reifert	3:27
9.	"Running from the Goathead"	Cutler	Cutler	4:29
10.	"The Headless Ritual"	(instrumental)	Cutler	2:24
Total length:				44:15

== Personnel ==
Autopsy

- Eric Cutler – guitar, vocals on "Running From the Goathead"
- Danny Coralles – guitar
- Joe Trevisano – bass
- Chris Reifert – drums, vocals

Production

- Adam Munoz – recording, mixing
- Joe Pentagno – cover art
