= Tormented (Abscess album) =

Studio album by Abscess
- Released: February 20, 2001
- Genre: Death metal, hardcore punk
- Length: 33:50
- Label: Listenable

Abscess chronology
Throbbing Black Werebeast (1996)	Tormented (2001)	Through the Cracks of Death (2002)

Professional ratings
Review scores
Source	Rating
Allmusic	3/5 stars

Tormented is the second studio album by American death metal/hardcore punk band Abscess formed in June 1994 by Chris Reifert and Danny Coralles in Oakland, California. released by Listenable Records in 2001.

== Track listing ==
1. "Rusted Blood" (2:31)
2. "Filth Chamber" (1:12)
3. "Tormented" (2:44)
4. "Madness and Parasites" (1:48)
5. "Deathscape in Flames" (2:32)
6. "Street Trash" (1:05)
7. "Halo of Disease" (1:43)
8. "Scratching at the Coffin" (2:48)
9. "Ratbag" (1:34)
10. "Death Runs Red" (3:42)
11. "Wormwind" (4:14)
12. "From Bleeding Skies" (1:14)
13. "Madhouse at the End of the World" (6:43)
