= The Tomb Within =

EP by Autopsy
- Released: September 13, 2010
- Recorded: July 2010 at Fantasy Studios
- Genre: Death metal; death-doom
- Length: 20:00
- Label: Peaceville Records

Autopsy chronology
Shitfun (1995)	The Tomb Within (2010)	Macabre Eternal (2011)

Professional ratings
Review scores
Source	Rating
About.com	5/5 stars
AllMusic	4/5 stars

The Tomb Within is an EP by the American death metal band Autopsy, released September 13, 2010, through Peaceville Records on CD and 12" vinyl. The 12" vinyl edition of The Tomb Within, limited to 1000 numbered copies, came with a free poster of cover artwork.

== Track listing ==
All songs written by Chris Reifert and Eric Cutler.

No.	Title	Length
1.	"The Tomb Within"	3:44
2.	"My Corpse Shall Rise"	4:17
3.	"Seven Skulls"	3:05
4.	"Human Genocide"	3:04
5.	"Mutant Village"	5:50
Total length:		20:00

== Personnel ==
- Chris Reifert – drums, vocals
- Danny Coralles – guitar
- Eric Cutler – guitar
- Joe Trevisano – bass
