= Acts of the Unspeakable =

Studio album by Autopsy
- Released: October 12, 1992
- Recorded: June 1992
- Studio: Starlight Sound, Richmond, California, US
- Genre: Death metal; death-doom
- Length: 35:22
- Label: Peaceville
- Producer: Autopsy

Autopsy chronology
Fiend for Blood (1992)	Acts of the Unspeakable (1992)	Shitfun (1995)

Acts of the Unspeakable is the third studio album by the American death metal band Autopsy. The album was self-produced by the band, was the only album to feature Josh Barohn, formerly of Suffocation, on bass.

== Music and lyrics ==
Joe Davita of Loudwire said the album sees the band "in their most starved and ravenous state." He described the band's self-production as achieving "a certain warmth as the meaty guitar tones slide off the bone, marinating in a simmering cauldron of human flesh."

The track "Battery Acid Enema" is about torturing someone by pouring sulfuric acid into their anus.

== Track listing ==
All lyrics are written by Chris Reifert; all music is composed by Autopsy.

No.	Title	Length
1.	"Meat"	2:38
2.	"Necrocannibalistic Vomitorium"	2:11
3.	"Your Rotting Face"	3:55
4.	"Blackness Within"	1:44
5.	"An Act of the Unspeakable"	2:25
6.	"Frozen with Fear"	0:30
7.	"Spinal Extractions"	0:21
8.	"Death Twitch"	2:13
9.	"Skullptures"	2:32
10.	"Pus / Rot"	4:01
11.	"Battery Acid Enema"	1:47
12.	"Lobotomized"	0:51
13.	"Funereality"	2:53
14.	"Tortured Moans of Agony"	0:45
15.	"Ugliness and Secretions"	1:09
16.	"Orgy in Excrements"	1:57
17.	"Voices"	2:07
18.	"Walls of the Coffin"	1:18
Total length:		35:22

== Credits ==
=== Autopsy ===
- Chris Reifert – vocals, drums
- Danny Coralles – guitar
- Eric Cutler – guitar
- Josh Barohn – bass guitar

=== Production ===
- Recorded June, 1992 at
- Produced by Autopsy
- Engineered by Bill Thompson
- Assistant Engineered by Malcolm Sherwood and Jeff Fogerty
- Painting and logo by Kent Mathieu
