= Mutilation (demo) =

Demo album by Death
- Released: 1986
- Recorded: April 12–13, 1986
- Studio: Lafayette, California
- Genre: Death metal
- Length: 10:24
- Label: Independent

Death chronology
Back from the Dead (1985)	Mutilation (1986)	Scream Bloody Gore (1987)

Mutilation is a demo album by American death metal band Death, released in 1986. The following year, the band would release their full-length debut album, Scream Bloody Gore on Combat Records.

== Legacy ==
American heavy metal magazine Metal Maniacs noted that the demo was "the most polished of the early Death recordings" and that "the underground and Combat Records were in agreement about Mutilation". Writer Albert Mudrian noted in his book Choosing Death: The Improbable History of Death Metal & Grindcore that the Mutilation demo "earned [Chuck] Schuldiner that elusive recording contract", stating it was "the band's most polished material in the form of the three-track demo". Author Ian Christe, in his book Sound of the Beast: The Complete Headbanging History of Heavy Metal, noted that Death's demos "became as heavily shared by tape traders as any well-established act in metal".

The demo gave the band the chance to be signed to Combat Records.

== Track listing ==
No.	Title	Length
1.	"Land of No Return"	2:48
2.	"Zombie Ritual"	4:22
3.	"Mutilation"	3:14
Total length:		10:24

== Personnel ==
=== Death ===
- Chuck Schuldiner – lead vocals, guitar, bass guitar
- Chris Reifert – drums

=== Additional personnel ===
- Mark Sikora – artwork
