= Dirty Cop No Donut =

- Directed by: Tim Ritter
- Written by: Tim Ritter
- Starring: Joel D. Wynkoop
- Cinematography: Tim Ritter
- Edited by: Steve McNaughton
- Production company: Twisted Illusions
- Release date: 1999
- Running time: 80 minutes
- Country: United States
- Language: English

Dirty Cop No Donut (sometimes written Dirty Cop, No Donut; aka Low Down Dirty Cop) is a 1999 mockumentary film directed by Tim Ritter. It follows a corrupt police officer (who is actually a police impersonator) called "Officer Friendly" (Joel D. Wynkoop) as he goes on a rampage. Released direct-to-video in 1999, it was given a limited theatrical release in 2001, where it received scathing reviews from critics. A sequel, titled Dirty Cop 2: I Am a Pig, was released in 2001.

== Reception ==
Mainstream critical reaction to Dirty Cop No Donut upon its limited theatrical release in 2001 was overwhelmingly negative, with the film earning a score of 6/100 (indicating "universal dislike or disgust") on Metacritic. The New York Times called the film a "stomach-turning exercise in gratuitous sadism", while The New York Post remarked that it was "a totally inept and unfunny parody of the TV show 'Cops'". The Village Voice considered the film to be "as drunk on fake blood as Friendly is on police power." TV Guide stated that "overall the project smacks of juvenile hijinks, even though writer/producer/director/cinematographer Tim Ritter has been making films since the mid-'80s".
