= Back from the Dead (demo) =

Demo album by Death
- Released: October 1985
- Genre: Death metal
- Length: 21:09
- Label: Independent

Death chronology
Rigor Mortis (1985)	Back from the Dead (1985)	Mutilation (1986)

Back from the Dead is a demo album by American death metal band Death, released in 1985.

== Track listing ==
No.	Title	Length
1.	"Intro" (instrumental)	0:35
2.	"Back from the Dead"	3:02
3.	"Mutilation"	2:29
4.	"Reign of Death"	2:28
5.	"Beyond the Unholy Grave"	3:13
6.	"Baptized in Blood"	3:42
7.	"Legion of Doom"	3:12
8.	"Skill to Kill"	2:28
Total length:		21:09

== Personnel ==
- Chuck Schuldiner – guitar, vocals
- Erik Meade – bass guitar
- Eric Brecht – drums
