= Shitfun =

Studio album by Autopsy
- Released: September 12, 1995; Re-released 2003
- Recorded: November 29 to December 9, 1994
- Studio: Razor's Edge San Francisco, California
- Genre: Death metal; death-doom
- Length: 55:40
- Label: Peaceville
- Producer: Autopsy; Jonathan Burnside; Tim Daly

Autopsy chronology
Acts of the Unspeakable (1992)	Shitfun (1995)	The Tomb Within (2010)

Shitfun is the fourth studio album by Autopsy, released in 1995. In 2003, it was re-released with ten bonus live tracks.

== Lyrics ==
Some of the album's themes pertain to coprophagia and feces. Jonathan Horsley of Decibel wrote: "You can’t have too many Autopsy records, and you’ve definitely got room in your collection for one album that’s daft enough to go there and decorate the accepted gore template with excrement."

== Track listing ==
No.	Title	Length
1.	"Deathmask"	2:50
2.	"Humiliate Your Corpse"	3:27
3.	"Fuckdog"	0:42
4.	"Praise the Children"	3:40
5.	"The Birthing"	2:12
6.	"Shiteater"	2:33
7.	"Formaldehigh"	0:52
8.	"I Sodomize Your Corpse"	3:40
9.	"Geek"	4:07
10.	"Brain Damage"	1:17
11.	"Blood Orgy"	3:24
12.	"No More Hate"	2:02
13.	"Grave Violaters"	4:47
14.	"Maim Rape Kill Rape"	5:04
15.	"I Shit on Your Grave"	0:42
16.	"An End to the Misery"	1:13
17.	"The 24 Public Mutilations"	3:10
18.	"Bathe in Fire"	1:41
19.	"Bowel Ripper"	1:12
20.	"Burnt to a Fuck"	3:46
21.	"Excremental Ecstasy"	3:15
Total length:		55:40

2003 re-release only - live bonus tracks
No.	Title	Length
22.	"Slaughterday"	4:02
23.	"Fiend for Blood"	0:38
24.	"Fleshcrawl"	0:41
25.	"Torn from the Womb"	3:05
26.	"Shit Eater"	2:14
27.	"Charred Remains"	3:39
28.	"Death Twitch"	2:16
29.	"Dead"	2:29
30.	"Spinal Extractions"	0:24
31.	"Twisted Mass of Burnt Decay"	2:10

== Personnel ==
Autopsy

- Chris Reifert - vocals, drums, bass (tracks 3, 5, 7, 10, 13, 18–19)
- Danny Coralles - guitar, bass (tracks 8 and 11)
- Eric Cutler - guitar, bass (tracks 1–2, 9, 14, 17, 21)

Additional musicians

- Freeway Migliore - bass (track 6, 12, 15–16)
- Clint Bower - bass (track 4, 20)
- Petri Toivonen - backing scream (track 5)
- Mika Toivonen - confession (13)
