= Zombie Ritual =

Song by Death

from the album Scream Bloody Gore
- Released: 1987
- Studio: Los Angeles
- Genre: Death metal
- Length: 4:35
- Label: Combat Records
- Producer: Randy Burns

"Zombie Ritual" is a song by American death metal band Death, appearing on the band's 1987 debut album Scream Bloody Gore. It is considered a hallmark of the band's early discography.

The song originally appeared on the band's Mutilation demo, released in 1986.

== Composition and lyrics ==
The song's structure contains a pre-chorus, according to Loudwire. The song's lyrics detail a zombie attack, drawing influence from horror fiction. Loudwire called it "horror-and-gore-lambasted".

== Legacy ==
In 2013, Loudwire said the song's intro was "perhaps the most familiar Death guitar lick." In 2015, Loudwire included it in the site's list of the "top 10 songs about zombies". In 2021, Ultimate Guitar named the track as among the heaviest songs of the 1980s. Eli Enis of Revolver said the riff was "a fucking classic" in 2022. That same year, Swedish rock band Ghost covered the song at a concert in Tampa, Florida.
