= Fiend for Blood =

EP by Autopsy
- Released: 1991
- Recorded: September 20–21, 1991
- Studio: Starlight Sound, Richmond, California
- Genre: Death metal
- Length: 12:21
- Label: Peaceville Records
- Producer: Autopsy

Autopsy chronology
Mental Funeral (1991)	Fiend for Blood (1991)	Acts of the Unspeakable (1992)

Fiend for Blood is an EP by American death metal band Autopsy, released in 1991 on Peaceville Records. The whole of this release is available as bonus tracks on the 2003 version of Acts of the Unspeakable. It is also included on the 2012 compilation album All Tomorrow's Funerals.

== Track listing ==
All tracks are written by Chris Reifert, except where noted.

No.	Title	Writer(s)	Length
1.	"Fiend for Blood"		0:28
2.	"Keeper of Decay"		2:26
3.	"Squeal Like a Pig"		3:43
4.	"Ravenous Freaks"		2:25
5.	"A Different Kind of Mindfuck"		0:48
6.	"Dead Hole"	Danny Coralles, Reifert	2:29
Total length:			12:21

== Personnel ==
Autopsy

- Chris Reifert – vocals, drums
- Danny Coralles – guitar
- Eric Cutler – guitar
- Steve Di Giorgio – bass

Production

- Recorded and mixed September 20–21, 1991 at Starlight Sound, Richmond, California
- Produced by Autopsy
- Engineered by Bill Thompson
- Cover art by John Chandler
