= Joel D. Wynkoop =

American actor and filmmaker (born 1960)

Joel D. Wynkoop (born August 24, 1960, in Owatonna, Minnesota) is an American actor and filmmaker.

== Biography ==
The Florida-based filmmaker who has gained a following in the horror-movie video circuit through his appearances in over 30 independent films and has worked numerous times with directors Tim Ritter and Kevin Lindenmuth.

=== Actor career ===
His roles have varied from a victim of a jealous husband in Killing Spree (1987) to Angus Lynch, the escaped serial killer in Creep (1995) and Gus Kimball, the psychotic policeman who is the subject of the "mockumentaries" Dirty Cop No Donut (1999) and Dirty Cop 2: I Am A Pig (2001).

=== Directing career ===
He has produced and directed two efforts: Lost Faith (1992), a martial arts film and The Bite (2005), a vampire/horror movie. He received the Best Actor Award at the Italian Film Festival in 1995 for Creep and the prestigious Crystal Reel Award for The Bite from the Florida Motion Picture and Television Association.

Wynkoop's other movies include: Truth or Dare A Critical Madness, Twisted Illusions one and two, Wicked Games, Screaming For Sanity, Rot, Scary Tales, Scary Tales: The Return of Mr. Longfellow, Brain Robbers From Outer Space, Deathplots, All Wrapped Up, I Am Vengeance, Jan-Gel 2, The Beast From The East, Alien Agenda: Out Of The Darkness, Alien Agenda: Endangered Species, Alien Conspiracy, Return To The Lost World, Raging Bells, Light Of Blood, Dark Dimensions, Angora, Always Midnight, Tales For The Midnight Hour, Horror Tales 666, Tales Till The End, Jacker 2, Addicted To Murder 2: Tainted Blood, Blood Lust, Accidental Memories, and A Ludicrus Tale.
