= Scream Bloody Gore =

Studio album by Death
- Released: May 25, 1987
- Recorded: November 1986
- Studios: The Music Grinder in Los Angeles, California
- Genre: Death metal
- Length: 37:51
- Label: Combat
- Producer: Randy Burns

Death studio album chronology
Scream Bloody Gore (1987)	Leprosy (1988)

Death chronology
Mutilation (1986)	Scream Bloody Gore (1987)	Leprosy (1988)

Scream Bloody Gore is the debut studio album by American death metal band Death, released on May 25, 1987, by Combat Records. It is considered by many to be "the first true death metal record". Chuck Schuldiner, the band’s co-founder and leader, performed guitar, bass and vocals, and composed all tracks on the album.

John Hand is noted in the album's credits as playing rhythm guitar, though this was incorrect and Hand was only in the band for a short period and never performed or recorded on the album. This is the only Death album to feature drummer Chris Reifert, who had joined for the Mutilation demo, and the only Death album that was not recorded at Morrisound Recording.

Perseverance Holdings, Ltd. and Relapse Records reissued the album on May 20, 2016, on CD, vinyl, and cassette. The album was remastered for this release, and also included the original Florida session as well as recordings of rehearsals performed in 1986.

== Background and recording ==
When Steve Sinclair agreed to sign Death, he said to me, ‘Somewhere in the credits, I'm gonna put, “This record is Don Kaye’s folly.” That way, if it's a big bust, I'm gonna blame you.’ And I said, ‘Okay,’ thinking he was joking. But Steve was a ball breaker. And sure enough, when we got copies of the album in the office, right there on the inside sleeve, under the lyrics and credits, it said, ‘This record is Don Kaye’s folly.’ I just thought, Oh god. Now Chuck was a guy who was very passionate and very serious about what he did, and he could be a little bit abrasive. But he saw this, and he called me, and he was just livid. He said, ‘Who's gonna take this record seriously when it says it's somebody’s folly?’ He was really pissed off. “But it showed me that, although sometimes to his detriment, Chuck took his music really seriously. He was really interested in death metal and going as far as he could with that.

— Don Kaye of Combat Records,

Schuldiner and drummer Chris Reifert recorded the Mutilation demo, which caught the attention of Combat Records, who signed the band.

Bassist Steve Di Giorgio, who had previously played with the band as it shared practice space with Sadus, recorded bass on a test pressing of the album.

The album was recorded twice. The first recording of the album was done in Florida at American Recording Studios, which was not equipped to produce. According to Reifert, "the deal was sealed and [Combat] trusted us to find a studio and go at it on our own, which turned out to be a terrible idea! [laughs] We were enthusiastic, but unaware that the studio we picked was a bad choice, due to the fact that the folks who ran it had NO idea of what metal was. We figured our brutality would shine through, ya know?" Reifert noted that, "[the engineers] just looked at us blankly, like they didn't know anything about metal." This version of the album only featured guitar and drum tracks, and was rejected by Combat Records when it was sent to them. Reifert remarked, "They heard what had been going on and said 'no, this is not gonna work,' so we had to scrap that plan." The track listing for the Florida sessions consisted of "Torn to Pieces", "Legion of Doom", "Scream Bloody Gore", "Sacrificial Cunt" (later shortened to "Sacrificial" because the label asked the band to do so, possibly because "they didn't want to get P.M.R.C. on their case"), "Mutilation", "Land of No Return" and "Baptized in Blood".

Combat Records sent Death to a studio called the Music Grinder in Los Angeles. Reifert said it felt like an "airplane hangar." Schuldiner and Reifert re-recorded the album with Randy Burns as producer. Band manager Eric Greif recalled, "When Steve [Sinclair] was making arrangements for the recording of [the album's] second incarnation [...] from what I understand from Randy, it was just like 'Try to refine this a little. Try to make this as mainstream metal as you can.' That was the instruction given to Randy when it came time to record the record."

The Los Angeles session was released as the complete album by label Combat Records (later Relativity). Once Schuldiner returned to Florida, the first session was released as a promotional tape, and was eventually bootlegged. "Legion of Doom" was a longtime staple of Death's rehearsals and live shows, and was indeed the first song written, reaching back to when they were known as Mantas.

Despite the many songs written during Death's demo days, only half of them were re-recorded for the album, the rest being new compositions. "Infernal Death" and "Baptized in Blood" originally appeared on the Infernal Death demo. "Mutilation", "Zombie Ritual" and "Land of No Return" originally appeared on the Mutilation demo, and "Evil Dead" and "Beyond the Unholy Grave" were originally on Death By Metal. "Beyond the Unholy Grave" and "Land of No Return" were also cut from the vinyl and cassette versions of the album, though were included as CD-only bonus tracks and on subsequent re-releases in other formats, along with two live audio tracks taken from the Ultimate Revenge II video.

== Music and lyrics ==
The style of Scream Bloody Gore has been described as drawing from bands such as Possessed and Slayer, fusing "the wild vitriol of thrash and black metal" with "a handful of swanky melodies" and "insanely" violent lyrics. The sound has been called "primitive." Writer Ian Christe stated in Sound of the Beast: The Complete Headbanging History of Heavy Metal that the album emulated hardcore punk, "[evoking] the dark moods of horror sound tracks from the drive-in zombie and cannibal horror films of George Romero". Metal Forces described the album as "death metal at its utmost extreme, brutal, raw and offensive – the kind that separates the true death metallers from countless trend-following wimps". Sam Sodomsky of Pitchfork described the album as having a "weed-and-beer-scented basement atmosphere", and the music as "bludgeoning and immediate". The album's lyrics contain themes such as zombies and slasher film-style violence. Steve Huey of AllMusic said that although Scream Bloody Gore appears "slightly musically amateurish" in comparison to Death's later releases, it "trades polish for savage, gut-wrenching force and speed." Arthur von Nagel of American progressive metal band Cormorant observed, "the album's lyrics are rife with slasher flick violence, misogyny, homophobia, and sexual aggression, traits which clashed with the narrative of self-discovery and acceptance he crafted around his later, more sophisticated works". Chuck Schuldiner played using a Boss distortion pedal on the album. Certain songs on the album were inspired by horror movies. "Regurgitated Guts" was inspired by the 1980 film City of the Living Dead (a.k.a. The Gates of Hell), "Beyond the Unholy Grave" was influenced by the 1981 film The Beyond, and "Zombie Ritual" was inspired by the 1979 film Zombie, all of which were directed by Italian director Lucio Fulci. "Torn to Pieces" was inspired by Make Them Die Slowly. "Evil Dead" was named after the film of the same name, while the title track was inspired by Re-Animator.

== Reception and legacy ==
Professional ratings
Review scores
Source	Rating
AllMusic	5/5 stars
Collector's Guide to Heavy Metal	4/10
Decibel	9/10
Kerrang!	(1987) (2011)

Scream Bloody Gore is often considered the first death metal album. Although some critics consider Seven Churches by Possessed to be the first death metal record, Eduardo Rivadavia of AllMusic writes that, "Seven Churches was a transition between thrash metal and death metal, while Scream Bloody Gore defined the core elements of death metal". According to music journalist Joel McIver, Death's debut album was a "turning-point in extreme metal", and qualified it as "the first true death metal album". Canadian journalist Martin Popoff indicated Schuldiner as the musician who introduced "a new level of convolution that will mark the beginnings of the next stage in extreme."

Steve Huey of AllMusic said Scream Bloody Gore is "a necessary item for anyone interested in the genesis of death metal." Jonathan Horsley of MusicRadar said the album is "one of death metal’s foundational texts." According to Matt Mills of WhatCulture, Scream Bloody Gore "deserves to be put on a pedestal alongside Black Sabbath, Kill ‘Em All and Iron Maiden."

In 2016, a re-release of the album was one of the top 200 selling albums in the United States in its first week of release, marking Death's first appearance in the US Billboard 200 chart at No. 174.

Brazilian thrash metal band Sepultura covered "Zombie Ritual" as a bonus track for their 2013 album The Mediator Between Head and Hands Must Be the Heart and was included as the second side of the digital single The Age Of The Atheist.

Power metal band DragonForce covered "Evil Dead" as a bonus track from their 2017 album Reaching into Infinity. It was also covered by the Norwegian black metal band Mayhem for the vinyl bonus disc of their 2019 album Daemon.

== Track listing ==
All tracks written by Chuck Schuldiner.

No.	Title	Length
1.	"Infernal Death"	2:54
2.	"Zombie Ritual"	4:35
3.	"Denial of Life"	3:37
4.	"Sacrificial"	3:43
5.	"Mutilation"	3:30
6.	"Regurgitated Guts"	3:47
7.	"Baptized in Blood"	4:31
8.	"Torn to Pieces"	3:38
9.	"Evil Dead"	3:01
10.	"Scream Bloody Gore"	4:35
Total length:		37:51

CD bonus tracks
No.	Title	Length
11.	"Beyond the Unholy Grave"	3:08
12.	"Land of No Return"	3:00
Total length:		43:59

1999 remastered version
No.	Title	Length
13.	"Open Casket" (Live)	4:50
14.	"Choke on It" (Live)	5:56
Total length:		54:45

2008 remastered digipack version
No.	Title	Length
13.	"Denial of Life" (Live)	3:47
Total length:		47:56

2016 reissued Relapse Records version (bonus disc 1)
No.	Title	Length
1.	"Torn to Pieces" (Original Florida Session)	3:29
2.	"Legion of Doom" (Original Florida Session)	3:11
3.	"Scream Bloody Gore" (Original Florida Session)	4:29
4.	"Sacrificial" (Original Florida Session)	3:41
5.	"Mutilation" (Original Florida Session)	3:25
6.	"Land of No Return" (Original Florida Session)	2:59
7.	"Baptised in Blood" (Original Florida Session)	4:25
8.	"Regurgitated Guts" (Rehearsals August 20, 1986)	3:48
9.	"Sacrificial" (Rehearsals August 20, 1986)	4:08
10.	"Sacrificial - Take 2" (Rehearsals August 20, 1986)	1:39
11.	"Torn to Pieces" (Rehearsals August 20, 1986)	3:54
12.	"Do You Love Me? (Kiss cover) - Version 1" (Rehearsals August 20, 1986)	0:56
13.	"Infernal Death" (Rehearsals August 20, 1986)	3:01
14.	"Zombie Ritual" (Rehearsals August 20, 1986)	4:49
15.	"Beyond The Unholy Grave" (Rehearsals August 20, 1986)	3:01
16.	"Do You Love Me? - Version 2" (Rehearsals August 20, 1986)	3:09
17.	"Denial of Life" (Rehearsals August 20, 1986)	3:49
Total length:		57:53

2016 reissued Relapse Records version (bonus disc 2)
No.	Title	Length
1.	"(Part of) Scream Bloody Gore" (Rehearsals 5/28/86)	3:06
2.	"Legion of Doom" (Rehearsals 5/28/86)	3:28
3.	"Beyond The Unholy Grave" (Rehearsals 5/28/86)	3:12
4.	"Scream Bloody Gore" (Rehearsals 5/28/86)	4:45
5.	"Torn to Pieces" (Rehearsals 5/28/86)	3:39
6.	"Mutilation" (Rehearsals 5/26/86)	4:16
7.	"Torn to Pieces" (Rehearsals 5/26/86)	3:29
8.	"Zombie Ritual" (Rehearsals 5/26/86)	4:41
9.	"Land of No Return" (Rehearsals 5/26/86)	3:10
10.	"(Part of) Evil Dead" (Rehearsals 5/26/86)	1:19
11.	"Baptised in Blood" (Rehearsals 5/26/86)	4:59
12.	"Infernal Death" (Rehearsals 5/26/86)	2:57
13.	"Denial of Life" (Rehearsals 5/26/86)	3:22
14.	"Death Metal (Possessed cover)" (Rehearsals 5/26/86)	2:00
Total length:		48:23

== Personnel ==
Death

- Chuck Schuldiner – vocals, guitars, bass
- Chris Reifert – drums
- John Hand – credited on the album as being on rhythm guitar, but he did not perform on the album or any live performances.

Additional personnel

- Randy Burns – production
- Edward Repka – design, illustration

== Charts ==
Chart (2016)	Peak position
US Billboard 200	174
