= Horrorhammer =

Studio album by Abscess
- Released: March 26, 2007
- Recorded: June 27, 2006 to July 1, 2006
- Genre: Hardcore punk, death-doom
- Length: 34:55
- Label: Tyrant Syndicate Productions
- Producer: Adam Munoz

Abscess chronology
Damned and Mummified (2004)	Horrorhammer (2007)

Professional ratings
Review scores
Source	Rating
Allmusic	3.5/5 stars

Horrorhammer is the fifth studio album by American death metal/hardcore punk band Abscess. It was released on April 24, 2007, on Tyrant Syndicate Productions.

== Track listing ==
- All Songs Written By Chris Reifert, except where noted.
1. "Drink the Filth" – 2:40 (Bower)
2. "New Diseases" – 1:58
3. "Poison Messiah" – 4:12
4. "Another Private Hell" – 1:13
5. "Exterminate" – 2:56
6. "When Witches Burn" – 3:20 (Allen, Coralles)
7. "Four Grey Walls" – 2:15
8. "Beneath a Blood Red Sun" – 3:46
9. "Horrorhammer" – 2:44
10. "Hellhole" – 2:38 (Coralles)
11. "March of the Plague" – 4:46 (Bower)
12. "The Eternal Pyre" – 2:27

== Personnel ==
- Clint Bower - lead & rhythm guitars, vocals, bass
- Danny Corrales - lead & rhythm guitars, bass
- Joe Allen - bass
- Chris Reifert - drums, vocals, bass

== Production ==
- Recorded, Produced, Engineered & Mixed by Adam Munoz
