= Through the Cracks of Death =

Studio album by Abscess
- Released: 2002
- Genre: Death metal
- Length: 43:45
- Label: Relapse

Abscess chronology
Tormented (2001)	Through the Cracks of Death (2002)	Thirst for Blood, Hunger for Flesh (2003)

Professional ratings
Review scores
Source	Rating
Allmusic	3/5 stars

Through the Cracks of Death is the third studio album by American death metal/hardcore punk Abscess, released by Relapse Records in 2002.

== Track listing ==
1. "Raping the Multiverse" (3:50)
2. "Mourners Will Burn" (3:24)
3. "Through the Cracks of Death" (5:26)
4. "Escalation of Violence" (4:29)
5. "Serpent of Dementia" (5:41)
6. "An Asylum Below" (5:00)
7. "Tomb of the Unknown Junkie" (4:28)
8. "Monolithic Damnation" (3:37)
9. "Die for Today" (5:06)
10. "16 Horrors" (1:16)
11. "Vulnavia" (1:24)
