= Thirst for Blood, Hunger for Flesh =

Compilation album by Abscess
- Released: 2003
- Genre: Death metal; hardcore punk
- Length: 58:20
- Label: Necroharmonic Productions

Abscess chronology
Through the Cracks of Death (2002)	Thirst for Blood, Hunger for Flesh (2003)	Damned and Mummified (2004)

Thirst for Blood, Hunger for Flesh is a compilation album by Abscess featuring tracks from various demos, EPs, splits, and singles. It was released by Necroharmonic Productions in 2003.

In a review for Voices From The Darkside, Frank Stöver wrote: "So, if you already worshipped the regular ABSCESS releases and simply can’t get enough of them, this is certainly a worthy purchase."

== Track listing ==
1. "Speed Freak" – 1:27
2. "Leech Boy" – 1:35
3. "Swimming in Blood" – 2:14
4. "For Those I Hate" – 1:41
5. "Suicide Pact" – 3:55
6. "Beneath The Skin" – 3:02
7. "29th Lobotomy" – 1:47
8. "Wriggling Torsos" – 0:36
9. "Lunatic Whore" – 1:51
10. "Open Wound" – 2:19
11. "Scattered Carnage" – 0:58
12. "Die Pig Die" – 2:39
13. "To Die Again" – 4:39
14. "Throbbing Black Werebeast" – 1:18
15. "Brain Destroyer" – 2:31
16. "Doomsday inside My Head" – 3:51
17. "Horny Hag" – 1:18
18. "Leave the Skin" – 1:01
19. "Flesh Candy" – 4:18
20. "Fuckin Hell" – 2:39
21. "Necro Slut" – 1:28
22. "Maldoror" – 4:26
23. "Sink, Drown, Die" – 1:54
24. "Fuckface" – 1:57
25. "Thirst for Blood, Hunger for Flesh" – 2:53
