= Killing Spree =

- VHS released by Films Around the World
- Directed by: Tim Ritter
- Written by: Tim Ritter
- Produced by: Al Nicolosi
- Starring: Asbestos Felt; Courtney Lercara; Raymond Carbone; Joel D. Wynkoop; Rachel Rutz
- Cinematography: Mark L. Pederson
- Edited by: Robert Williams
- Music by: Perry Monroe
- Production company: Twisted Illusions
- Distributed by: Films Around the World
- Release date: 1987 (United States)
- Running time: 88 minutes
- Country: United States
- Language: English
- Budget: $75,000

Killing Spree is a 1987 horror film written and directed by Tim Ritter. Its plot follows a man who becomes jealous of the imagined affairs of his wife and kills everyone she meets, only for them to come back as zombies.

== Plot ==
Tom Russo, a paranoid airplane mechanic struggling to make ends meet, becomes convinced his wife, Leeza, is cheating on him with various men after he finds and reads what he assumes is Leeza's diary. While Leeza is out grocery shopping one afternoon, Tom's friend Ben (who Tom suspects is one of the men Leeza is having an affair with) drops by with his girlfriend Angel. Tom decapitates Angel, beats Ben to death with her head, and buries the couple's remains.

The next day, Tom lures back an electrician who he believes had sex with Leeza and scalps him by lifting the man into a ceiling fan that has had machetes attached to the blades. Tom sends Leeza to her mother's house and kills three others (a TV repairman, a courier, and a gardener) she wrote about sleeping with. The death of the courier is witnessed by Mrs. Palmer, the neighborhood busybody, so Tom rips her mandible out with a claw hammer.

At the offices of Romping Romance Magazine, Leeza shows her "diary" off, and reveals the adulterous anecdotes in it are just works of fiction. Leeza returns home to show Tom the cheque she received for her stories, just as Tom's victims return as zombies to avenge their own deaths. The ghouls initially want Tom, but offer to spare him if he kills Leeza (who they conclude is the one truly responsible for what happened to them). Tom refuses this bargain, and commits suicide by slitting his own throat with a hacksaw. The zombies deem this turn of events acceptable, exit the house, and leap into a pit that appears in the backyard. Leeza tries to leave as well, but as soon she opens the front door, she is attacked by an undead Tom.

== Cast ==
- Asbestos Felt as Tom Russo
- Courtney Lercara as Leeza Russo
- Raymond Carbone as Ben Seltzer
- Bruce Paquette as Delivery Man
- Joel D. Wynkoop as TV Repairman
- Kieran Turner as Lawn Man
- Alan Brown as Electrician
- Rachel Rutz as Angel
- Cloe Pavel as Mrs. Palmer
- Mel Pitler as Dan O'Neal
- Dwayne Willis as Charred Zombie
- Tracy Drolet as Secretary
- Al Nicolosi as Mr. Jerkins
- Vince Miranda as Stewmaster
- Tim Ritter as Cab Driver

== Reception ==
DVD Talk described the film as "horrific, stupid and shaggily lovable" and "far from the best DTV horror of the '80s, but it's not like it was ever trying". DVD Verdict wrote that while some enjoyment could be wrung from the film, it was brought down by leaden pacing and sheer ineptness. Writing in The Zombie Movie Encyclopedia, academic Peter Dendle describe it as, "People with too much time on their hands in Palm Beach throw together an uninteresting backyard slasher movie with a zombie twist."
