= Urine Junkies =

Compilation album by Abscess
- Released: August 22, 1995
- Recorded: July 23, 1994 – January 23, 1995
- Genre: Punk rock, death metal
- Length: 33:00
- Label: Relapse

Abscess chronology
Filthy Fucking Freaks (1995)	Urine Junkies (1995)	Seminal Vampires and Maggot Men (1996)

Professional ratings
Review scores
Source	Rating
Allmusic	2.5/5 stars

Urine Junkies is a compilation album by the death metal band Abscess featuring tracks from various demos and EPs. It was released by Relapse Records in 1995.

== Track listing ==
1. "Aching Meat" (4:44)
2. "Urine Junkies" (1:56)
3. "Crawled Up From the Sewer" (1:20)
4. "29th Lobotomy" (1:42)
5. "Horny Hag" (1:14)
6. "Depopulation" (2:04)
7. "Zombification" (3:27)
8. "Blacktooth Beast" (1:57)
9. "The Scent of Shit" (0:50)
10. "Altar Toy" (2:21)
11. "Suicide Fuck" (2:21)
12. "Raw Sewage" (4:07)
13. "Die Pig Die" (2:23)
14. "Inbred Abomination" (1:54)
15. "Unquenchable Thirst" (2:31)
16. "Abscess" (3:05)
17. "Bloodsucker" (2:40)
18. "Anally Impaled" (2:54)
