= Thomas A. Russo =

American lawyer, professor, and author (born 1943)

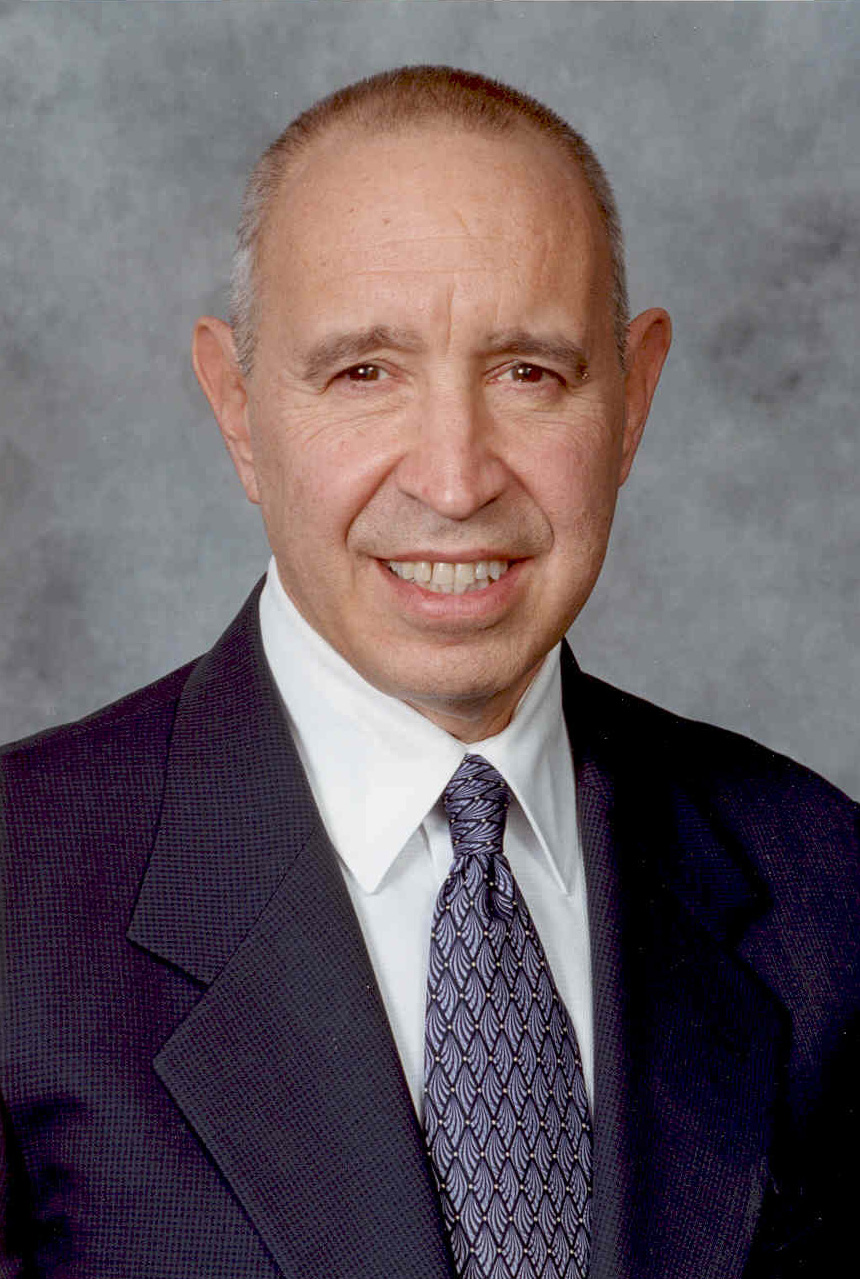
- Born: November 6, 1943 (age 82); Staten Island, New York, U.S.
- Education: Fordham University; Cornell Law School (JD); Cornell Graduate School of Business Administration (MBA)
- Occupations: Lawyer, Professor
- Years active: 1969 - present

Thomas A. Russo (born November 6, 1943) is an American attorney and former Wall Street executive. He was vice chairman and chief legal officer of Lehman Brothers and general counsel for American International Group (AIG), two of the companies that played a major role in the 2008 financial crisis.

== Early life and education ==
Russo was born in Staten Island, New York, the son of Lucio F. Russo, a former New York State assemblyman, and Tina I. Russo. He attended Xavier High School in Manhattan, a private Jesuit preparatory school. In 1960, he worked as floor clerk at the American Stock Exchange. Russo pursued a bachelor's degree in economics at Fordham University where he graduated Phi Beta Kappa in 1965. In 1969, he received an MBA from the Cornell Graduate School of Business, and in that same year his J.D. degree from Cornell Law School.

== Career ==
After earning his legal degree, Russo was a staff attorney for the Securities and Exchange Commission (SEC). In 1971, Russo became an associate at the Wall Street law firm Cadwalader, Wickersham & Taft. In 1975, Russo was appointed deputy general counsel of the newly created Commodity Futures Trading Commission (CFTC) and shortly thereafter became the first director of its Division of Trading and Markets.It was reported that President Jimmy Carter considered Russo for the post of chairman of the CFTC.

In 1977, Russo rejoined Cadwalader, Wickersham & Taft as a partner and began representing many of Wall Street's biggest banks, funds, brokerage firms and investment banks. He was widely recognized as an expert on how New York's stock markets interact with Chicago's futures markets. He was an advisor to the Presidential Task Force on Market Mechanisms after the stock market crash of 1987. In 1989, he was a leading candidate of President George H. W. Bush to lead the SEC. He was frequently named one of the “100 Most Influential Attorneys in the United States” by the National Law Journal.

=== Lehman Brothers ===
From 1993 to 2008, Russo was vice chairman of Lehman Brothers Holdings Inc. and was chief legal officer of the firm through its 2008 bankruptcy, the largest in U.S. history. When he joined the company, it had 325 outside law firms so Russo reduced the number of outside lawyers and incentivized the firms to bring investment banking business to Lehman Brothers. He negotiated the sale of Shearson Lehman to Primerica Corp. for $1 billion, at that time the largest brokerage acquisition ever. He was a key player in bringing about the record $1.4 billion settlement in 2003 by 10 Wall Street companies, accused by the SEC and New York State of conflicts of interest while aiming to increase their investment-banking business. In 2005, Russo was the second-highest-paid legal counsel in America. He served on the board of the Security Industry Association, Wall Street's lobbying arm and led efforts to streamline Wall Street regulations. He led efforts by Wall Street to self-regulate the over-the-counter derivatives market. He was a regular attendee of the World Economic Forum.

=== AIG ===
Russo joined AIG in 2010 as executive vice president and general counsel when the company was still owned by U.S. taxpayers and digging out from a $185 billion government bailout. He oversaw the legal aspects of the company's divestiture to focus on its insurance business and was instrumental in negotiating strategic transactions that enabled the company to fully reimburse the federal government for its bailout. At the time of his departure, AIG Chief Executive Peter Hancock wrote that Russo's accomplishments at AIG included "having led the company through negotiations with the U.S. Treasury and Federal Reserve Bank of New York to repay the government and U.S. taxpayers with a profit. The in-house team negotiated more than 90 strategic transactions to sell AIG's non-core assets, guided six sales of AIG common stock by the U.S. Treasury, and fended off unprecedented litigation challenges."

Between Lehman and AIG, Russo worked for Patton Boggs LLP.

Russo was an advisor to the 1987 Brady Commission, and was an adjunct professor at Columbia University's Graduate Business School. He has authored several books and over 70 articles on topics in the commodities, securities and corporate legal fields relating to financial market regulation.

== Civic involvement ==
Russo is on the board and vice chairman of the Institute of International Education, a nonprofit group that administers the Fulbright Scholarship Program among other programs. He is co-founder of the Scholar Rescue Fund which provides fellowships for established scholars whose lives and work are threatened in their home countries. Russo's work on behalf of the fund was recognized in the Congressional Record.

He is a former member of the Board of Governors of the Financial Industry Regulatory Authority (FINRA) and the Federal Reserve Bank of New York International Advisory Committee. He has held board positions with the March of Dimes and the Institute for Financial Markets and is a member of the Economic Club of New York and the Fellows of Phi Beta Kappa society.

== Books ==
- Regulation of Brokers, Dealers and Securities Markets, Warren, Gorham & Lamont, Inc., Boston (1977), and Supplement (1979) Co-authors: Nicholas Wolfson and Richard M. Phillips
- Regulation of The Commodities Futures and Options Markets, Shepard's/ McGraw-Hill Inc., Colorado Springs (1983).
- The 2008 Financial Crisis and its Aftermath: Addressing the Next Debt Challenge, published by Group of Thirty, Washington, D.C. (2011) Co-author: Aaron J. Katzel
