= Truth or Dare? (1986 film) =

1986 American slasher film written by Tim Ritter

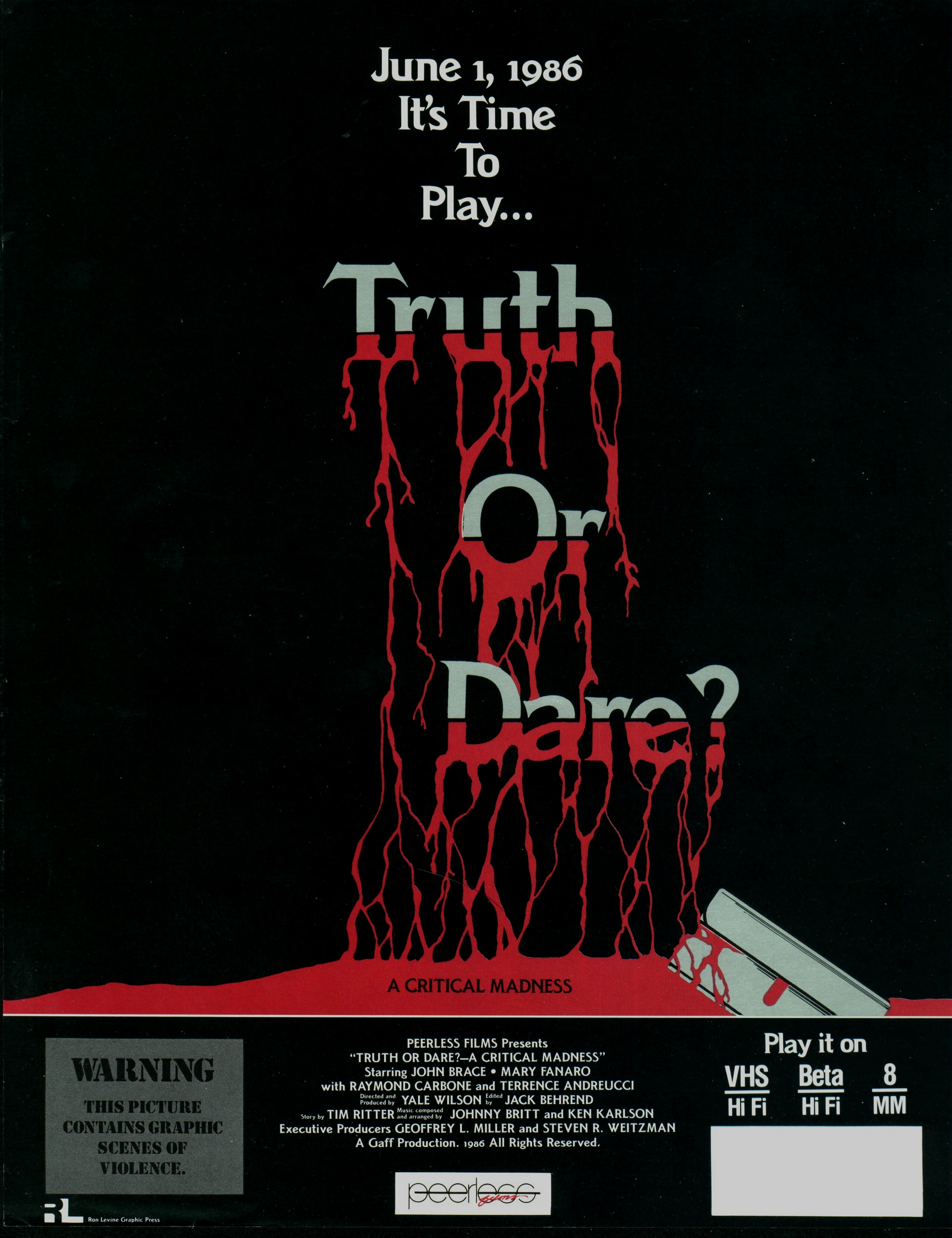
- Film poster
- Directed by: Yale Wilson
- Written by: Tim Ritter
- Produced by: Yale Wilson
- Starring: John Brace; Mary Fanaro; Joel D. Wynkoop; Terence Andreucci; Raymond Carbone
- Cinematography: Ned Miller; Christopher M. Burritt
- Edited by: Jack Behrend
- Music by: Johnny Britt; Ken Karlson
- Production companies: Peerless Films; Twisted Illusions
- Distributed by: Peerless Home Video
- Release date: June 1, 1986 (United States)
- Running time: 90 minutes
- Country: United States
- Language: English
- Budget: $200,000-$750,000

Truth or Dare? is a 1986 slasher film written by Tim Ritter, and based on his short "Truth or Dare?" from the 1985 anthology film Twisted Illusions.

== Plot ==
Mike Strauber, a businessman with a history of mental illness, walks in on his wife, Sharon, having sex with Jerry, his best friend. Mike storms off, and wanders aimlessly as he contemplates suicide while flashing back to his time with Sharon, and a childhood incident where he cut himself with a razor while playing 'truth or dare?'

Mike picks up a female hitchhiker, and the two go to a campsite, where they play 'truth or dare?' The game turns violent and ends when a park ranger finds Mike, who had mutilated himself at the behest of the hitchhiker, who was just a hallucination.

Mike is admitted to the Sunnyville Mental Institution and is released over a year later due to good behavior, overcrowding, and budget cuts. Immediately after being discharged, Mike tracks down and murders Jerry and is readmitted to Sunnyville after being wounded while trying to kill Sharon. Once back in Sunnyville, Mike hallucinates playing 'truth or dare?' with two disfigured patients and cuts most of his own face off with a knife he had smuggled into the facility. Five months later, Mike, who has taken to wearing a frowning copper mask, goes berserk in his room after an employee taunts him by giving him a picture of Sharon. When an orderly tries to calm him, Mike stabs the man in the eye with a pencil, then escapes the institution, hijacking a car full of weapons on his way out.

Mike goes on a rampage, indiscriminately slaughtering men, women, and children on his way to Sharon's house. Realizing where Mike is going, Detective Rosenberg and Doctor Thorne head there, with Thorne arriving first. Thorne is unable to save Sharon and is killed in a shootout with Mike. Rosenberg happens upon Mike, bleeding heavily from being shot by Thorne and manages to talk him down and disarm him. Mike is taken by paramedics and placed back in Sunnyville.

== Cast ==
- John Brace as Mike Strauber
- Mary Fanaro as Sharon Strauber
- Bruce Gold as Jerry Powers
- AJ McLean as Young Mike Strauber
- Priscilla Duff as Mrs. Strauber
- Kerry Ellen Walker as Hitch-Hiker
- D.C. Goff as Park Ranger
- Rick Paige as Doctor Burt Thorne
- Mona Jones as Doctor Emma Evans
- Bruce Paquette as Garage Attendant
- Edward L. Elliott II as Man-Next-Door
- Therese C. Elliott as Woman-Next-Door
- Raymond Carbone as Detective Jon K. Rosenberg
- Geoffrey Miller as Wes
- Tami Smith as Doctor Bachman
- Norm Rosenbaum as Bald Man
- Asbestos Felt as Warty Man/Newscaster Voice
- Anthony T. Townes as Steve
- Joel D. Wynkoop as Guard #2
- Pam Weitzman as Woman With Carriage
- Terence Andreucci as Officer Pournelle
- Richard K. Day as Officer Down
- Si Stillerman as Medical Examiner
- Scott Weitzman as Baseball Player
- Angelina Rodell as Old Lady

== Production ==
On a budget of $200,000 to $750,000, Truth or Dare? was shot on 16 mm film, produced specifically for the direct-to-video market. Writer and director Tim Ritter was seventeen when the script was sold, and eighteen during production.

Filming took place on location in Palm Beach County, Florida. The cast was mostly selected from the Burt Reynolds Theatre.

In the making-of documentary, Celluloid Carnage: The Making of Truth or Dare?, Ritter states that tensions between himself and the producers ultimately led to him being removed from production on the first day of filming and directorial duties were taken over by producer Yale Wilson.

== Reception and legacy ==
Tom Becker of DVD Verdict wrote that Truth or Dare? was "a typical, entertaining, and typically entertaining low-budget, direct-to-home-video '80s slasher/horror entry. It contains all the requisites: some nudity, lots of violence (some graphic, all cheesy), a masked madman, and plot holes so glaring, it seems like big chunks of the film are just missing (they aren't)". Film Threat declared the film had nothing going for it except nostalgia. Elijah Wood has called it one of his favorite films and says "And I've introduced it to so many people and it has its fans."

== Sequels ==
The film was followed by four sequels, all of them written and directed by Tim Ritter, and released direct-to-video. They are 1994's Wicked Games, 1998's Screaming for Sanity: Truth or Dare 3, 2011's Deadly Dares: Truth or Dare Part IV, and 2017's I Dared You! Truth or Dare Part 5. Funds were raised for the fifth film by Ritter and Scott Tepperman through the crowdsourcing website Indiegogo. I Dared You! saw its official DVD release in March 2018.

An unofficial sequel called Writer's Block (subtitled Truth or Dare 2 in some versions) was released by Dead Alive Productions in 1995.
