= Abscess (band) =

American death metal band

- Origin: Oakland, California, United States
- Genres: Death metal; death-doom; hardcore punk
- Years active: 1994–2010
- Labels: Relapse; Necropolis; Necroharmonic; Peaceville
- Past members: Joe Allen; Danny Coralles; Chris Reifert; Clint Bower; Freeway Migliore; Jim Mack

Abscess was an American death metal band from Oakland, California. The band was formed in June 1994 by Chris Reifert and Danny Coralles, former members of Autopsy. Abscess disbanded in 2010.

== Members ==
Last lineup

- Chris Reifert — drums, vocals (1994–2010)
- Danny Coralles — guitar (1994–2010)
- Joe Allen (Joe Trevisano) — bass (1998–2000, 2002–2010)

Past members

- Clint Bower — guitar, vocals (1994–2010)
- Frank "Freeway" Migliore — bass (1994–1997)
- Jim Mack — bass (2000–2002)

Timeline

== Discography ==
Abscess discography
- Studio albums: 6
- Extended plays: 1
- Live albums: 1
- Compilation albums: 2
- Demos: 5

Studio albums

- Seminal Vampires and Maggot Men (1996)
- Tormented (2001)
- Through the Cracks of Death (2002)
- Damned and Mummified (2004)
- Horrorhammer (2007)
- Dawn of Inhumanity (2010)

Live albums

- Pustulation of Embrionic Flesh (live on KZSU) (1994)

Compilation albums

- Urine Junkies (1995)
- Thirst for Blood, Hunger for Flesh (2003)

EPs

- Throbbing Black Werebeast (1997)

Demos

- Abscess (1994)
- Raw Sick & Brutal Noize! (1994)
- Crawled up from the Sewer (1995)
- Filthy Fucking Freaks (1995)
- Open Wound (1998)

Splits

- Split with Deranged (10", 2001)
- Split with Machetazo (CD, 2001)
- Split with Bloodred Bacteria (CD, 2001)
- Split with Bonesaw (CD, 2008)
- Split with Population Reduction (CD, 2009)
