= Damned and Mummified =

Studio album by Abscess
- Released: 2004
- Genre: Death metal
- Length: 47:58
- Label: Red Stream

Abscess chronology
Thirst for Blood, Hunger for Flesh (2003)	Damned and Mummified (2004)	Horrorhammer (2007)

Damned and Mummified is the fourth studio album by American death metal/hardcore punk band Abscess; released on Red Stream in 2004.

== Track listing ==
1. "Through the Trash Darkly" – 3:27
2. "Empty Horizon" – 4:42
3. "Swallow the Venom" – 3:29
4. "Caverns of Hades" – 5:16
5. "The Dead are Smiling at Me" – 3:54
6. "Twilight Bleeds" – 3:41
7. "Lust for the Grave" – 4:04
8. "The Dream is Dead" – 6:00
9. "Damned and Mummified" – 2:29
10. "Inferno of Perverse Creation" – 4:38
11. "Tattoo Collector" – 2:49
12. "Tirade of Hallucinations" – 3:29

== Personnel ==
- Chris Reifert - drums, vocals
- Clint Bower - guitars, vocals
- Danny Coralles - guitars
- Joe Allen - bass guitar
