= Severed Survival =

Studio album by Autopsy
- Released: April 24, 1989
- Recorded: January 1989
- Studios: Starlight Sound, Richmond, California, US
- Genres: Death metal; death-doom
- Length: 41:38
- Label: Peaceville Records
- Producers: Autopsy; John Marshall

Autopsy chronology
| Severed Survival (1989) | Retribution for the Dead (1991) |

Alternate cover

Severed Survival is the debut album by American death metal band Autopsy, released by Peaceville Records on April 24, 1989. The album was preceded by two demos, Demo 87 and Critical Madness.

The album's sound is rooted in Bay Area thrash metal and the emerging death metal genre from Florida. Additionally, the music incorporates elements of doom metal. Lyrical themes explored on the album include death and gore.

It is considered to be one of the first death metal albums, and one of the genre's most important releases, having helped lay the foundation for both the genre and its sub-genre of death-doom.

== Background and recording ==
Cutler said the album's tracks were composed by "[getting] really stoned and playing guitar." Recording for the album began after Coralles had been in the band for approximately seven days. Although Peaceville Records allotted the band a USD$5,000 budget to produce the album, they "spent half of it on weed." The remaining funds gave the band four days to complete the album, and it was finished with very few overdubs. At the time, the band did not disclose to their label that they had used their funds to buy marijuana. Despite the album's bass guitar tracks having been performed by Steve Di Giorgio of Sadus, Ken Sorvali is credited for this role. According to Cutler, the band was under the impression that Sorvali would be in the band, so he was listed in the album's notes. Di Giorgio, who had already known the band, was recruited as an "emergency bass player" and quickly recorded his bass tracks on the album after only a few times practicing with the band.

== Release history ==
Severed Survival was originally released by Peaceville Records on April 24, 1989. Various re-releases exist with different bonus tracks and bonus CDs. Furthermore, a different cover exists for this album, which depicts the point of view of the person receiving the autopsy. To coincide with the album's 20th anniversary, Peaceville Records released a special two-disc edition of Severed Survival on February 23, 2009. It includes rare rehearsal and live material for a bonus disc as well as demo versions of two songs — "Mauled to Death" and "Human Genocide" — which did not make the final cut on the original album. Also featured in the package is a booklet with notes by the band themselves, detailing the history of Autopsy's early years, with rare photos and images. The reissue also includes two new Autopsy tracks that were recorded in September 2008, and are included on the reissue's second disc.

== Music and lyrics ==
Rooted in Bay Area thrash metal and incorporating elements of doom metal, the sound on Severed Survival has been described as "gloomy", "gruesome," and "moody." Music journalist T. Coles delineated the album as "the soundtrack to a hack surgeon operating on you, then slowly offering the mirror so you can gaze on your new adjustments." The album's instrumentation draws influence from "slow stuff" like Trouble, Saint Vitus, Candlemass, Witchfinder General, and Pentagram. Autopsy drummer and vocalist Chris Reifert said, "At that time there weren't many bands playing that kind of style, but we liked them all along with the fast stuff like Terrorizer, Slayer and Master. In terms of playing, we just wanted to be heavy." Music journalist Martin Popoff stated that the album "combined choking, rumbling, admirably bassy clouds of doom, post-thrash and proto-death with pre-crust and pre-grind characteristics."

The guitar tones of Eric Cutler and Danny Coralles have been described as "sludgey", and their riffs have been described as "razor-sharp."

The album is notable for its bass sound which was mixed much higher than all the other tracks. The album's production values have been described as "rather incompetent." Metal Hammer called the album "subversive, even by death metal standards" and made note of the album's "weird detours into crippling doom and some of the goofiest lyrics of all time".

The guitar solos on "Gasping For Air" have been described as "surprisingly musical," and as "[constituting the album's] only remote elements of melody." Coralles said the album's guitar solos were "part well thought out compositions and part mindless drunken perverted gifts from the gods".

The album's lyrical themes have been called "sickening," and draw heavily on horror, death and gore concepts, continuing in the style of Reifert's former band, Death. Reifert's vocals have been noted for their "croaking delivery." Although the tracks are not inspired directly by horror films, the title track is based on Stephen King's short story "Survivor Type." The theme of death by burning is explored on the opening track "Charred Remains".

== Artwork ==
Invisible Oranges described the original album cover as an image of "a man being torn apart, which proved aggressive enough to be censored." Reifert claims that neither versions of the cover artwork created for the album relate to the lyrics. Joe DiVita of Loudwire wrote: "Imagine undergoing a routine operation only to have the anesthesia wear off mid-surgery and hovering over you are four diabolical zombies in scrubs, brandishing the tools of the trade. Blood is splattered everywhere and the menacing faces are wide-eyed and staring back at you, seemingly eager to see that you have woken up earlier than expected. [...] This album cover depicts one of the most horrifying situations anyone could find themselves in."

== Reception and legacy ==
Professional ratings
Review scores
| Source | Rating |
|---|---|
| Allmusic | link |

Eduardo Rivadavia of AllMusic called Severed Survival "one of the death metal genre's seminal cornerstones." He also said, "Autopsy dealt in nothing but the roughest, basest brutality, and obviously death metal fans young and old wouldn't have it any other way, which is why Severed Survival maintains its vaunted place amidst the genre's defining early statements." Metal Hammer called the album "one of the genre's first masterworks". Joe DiVita of Loudwire referred to the album's alternate cover as one of the scariest heavy metal album covers of all time, saying it was "clearly better than the original".

The album was featured in the 2003 book The Top 500 Greatest Heavy Metal Albums of All Time by music journalist Martin Popoff, who stated the belief that Reifert's vocals on the album [help[ed] define the main death style used today."

Autopsy has been said to have pioneered gore lyrics on the album. The album is considered to be highly influential in the death metal genre, going on to influence bands such as Cannibal Corpse, Entombed, and Dismember.

== Track listing ==
All songs written by Chris Reifert, except where noted.

| No. | Title | Writer(s) | Length |
|---|---|---|---|
| 1. | "Charred Remains" | | 3:40 |
| 2. | "Service for a Vacant Coffin" | Eric Cutler, Reifert | 2:51 |
| 3. | "Disembowel" | Cutler, Reifert | 4:05 |
| 4. | "Gasping for Air" | Cutler | 3:20 |
| 5. | "Ridden with Disease" | | 4:53 |
| 6. | "Pagan Saviour" | | 4:10 |
| 7. | "Impending Dread" | Cutler, Reifert | 4:46 |
| 8. | "Severed Survival" | | 3:28 |
| 9. | "Critical Madness" | | 4:32 |
| 10. | "Embalmed" | Cutler, Reifert | 3:02 |
| 11. | "Stillborn" (Hidden Track) | | 2:48 |
| Total length: | | | 41:38 |

== Personnel ==
Autopsy

- Chris Reifert - vocals, drums
- Danny Coralles - guitar
- Eric Cutler - guitar

Session musicians

- Steve Di Giorgio - bass

Production

- Recorded in January 1989 at Starlight Sound
- Produced by John Marshall and Autopsy
- Engineered by John Marshall
- Cover art by Kent Mathieu
- Cover art by Kev Walker (Alternative cover)
