= Retribution for the Dead =

EP by Autopsy
- Released: 1990/1991
- Genre: Death metal; death-doom
- Length: 12:32
- Label: Peaceville Records

Autopsy chronology
Severed Survival (1989)	Retribution for the Dead (1990)	Mental Funeral (1991)

Retribution for the Dead is an EP by the American death metal band Autopsy, released by Peaceville Records. It features two songs which were re-recorded for the Mental Funeral album - the title song is exclusive to this EP.

== Track listing ==
1. "Retribution for the Dead" – 3:55
2. "Destined to Fester" – 4:30
3. "In the Grip of Winter" – 4:07
