= Seminal Vampires and Maggot Men =

Studio album by Abscess
- Released: September 24, 1996
- Recorded: May 1996
- Genre: Hardcore punk, death metal
- Length: 28:37
- Label: Relapse

Abscess chronology
Urine Junkies (1995)	Seminal Vampires and Maggot Men (1996)	Throbbing Black Werebeast (1997)

Professional ratings
Review scores
Source	Rating
Allmusic	4.5/5 stars

Seminal Vampires and Maggot Men is the debut studio album by the death metal/hardcore punk band Abscess. It was released by Relapse Records in 1996.

== Track listing ==
1. "Naked Freak Show" (1:15)
2. "Freak Fuck Fest (Naked FreakShow II: Orgy of the Gaffed)" (1:39)
3. "Patient Zero" (1:32)
4. "Zombie Ward" (1:54)
5. "Mud" (1:15)
6. "Stiff and Ditched" (1:12)
7. "Fatfire" (3:11)
8. "I Don't Give a Fuck" (2:23)
9. "Burn, Die and Fucking Fry" (1:29)
10. "Global Doom" (1:43)
11. "Removing the Leech" (1:53)
12. "Pinworms" (2:40)
13. "Gonna Mow You Down" (1:13)
14. "Disgruntled" (1:30)
15. "Tunnel of Horrors" (2:28)
16. "Worm Sty Infection" (1:53)
17. "Dirty Little Brats" (2:05)
18. "The Scent of Shit" (0:42)
