= Sound of the Beast =

2003 book by Ian Christe

Sound of the Beast: The Complete Headbanging History of Heavy Metal
- Author: Christe, Ian
- Language: English
- Subject: Heavy metal music
- Genre: Musicology
- Publisher: HarperEntertainment
- Publication date: 2003
- Media type: Print (Hardcover and Paperback)
- Pages: 416 (first edition)
- ISBN: 978-0060523626
- OCLC: 50080235
- Dewey Decimal: 781.66 21
- LC Class: ML3534 .C475 2003

Sound of the Beast: The Complete Headbanging History of Heavy Metal is a 2003 book by Ian Christe, documenting the history of heavy metal music and its origins.

The book argues that heavy metal began with Black Sabbath in 1970, then traces the emergence of 'proto-' heavy metal bands including Budgie and Captain Beyond. He continues through the 1970s with hard rock bands such as Van Halen, Kiss, and Judas Priest, then charts the emergence of NWOBHM, practiced by Iron Maiden and Raven, and thrash metal acts such as Metallica, Megadeth, and Slayer, and subsequent genres including grindcore, death metal, and black metal.

== Source interviews ==
Sound of the Beast is based on a narrative drawn from over a hundred original interviews with members of Black Sabbath, Rainbow, Kiss, Judas Priest, Raven, Tygers of Pan Tang, Venom, Saxon, Exciter, Dio, Twisted Sister, Armored Saint, Plasmatics, Misfits, Metallica, Slayer, Megadeth, Anthrax, Possessed, Hirax, Bathory, Hellhammer, Celtic Frost, Voivod, Nuclear Assault, Sepultura, Napalm Death, Morbid Angel, Deicide, White Zombie, Public Enemy, Danzig, Soundgarden, Fear Factory, Mayhem, Emperor, Immortal, Mortiis, Slipknot, Death and other bands.

== Foreign editions ==
The book was also released in a hardcover edition in the United Kingdom by Allison & Busby in 2004, and has been translated into Finnish, German, French, Spanish, Italian, Portuguese, Japanese, Czech, Serbian, Croatian, and Polish editions.

== Reception ==
Greg Burk, writing for the LA Weekly in 2003, dubbed Sound of the Beast: "The first book to chart the vector of not just metal’s origins, but the myriad mutations through which it continues to infect the planet."

Brent Burton, writing for the Washington City Paper, deigned that "Like Nick Tosches' 1977 Country, Christe's Sound of the Beast takes a deep-focus view of music that most regard as one-dimensional—drawing attention to some of the rawest purveyors of each subgenre. However, unlike Tosches' writing, Christe's descriptions of the music he so clearly loves are often ungainly. On his beloved Sabbath: 'Above all else they had the best riffs, the huge guitar and bass lines that last a lifetime.' And on Metallica: 'Kill 'Em All might have been the first record fast enough that when fans played it to the point of skipping, a full chorus could be captured in a single revolution of the vinyl.' Christe also falters when he inexplicably attempts to beat metal's 'white music' rap without any ammo: Hard rockers Phil Lynott and Slash are among a mere handful of names enlisted for the cause."
