= Danny Coralles =

American musician

- Born: June 10, 1960 (age 66)
- Genres: Death metal; death-doom
- Occupation: Guitarist
- Instruments: Guitar, bass
- Years active: 1986-present
- Member of: Autopsy
- Formerly of: Abscess, The Ravenous, Eat My Fuk, Doomed, Bloodbath

Daniel Coralles (born June 10, 1960) is a guitarist for Autopsy and co-founded Abscess with drummer Chris Reifert. Coralles has also collaboratated with Frank "Killjoy" Pucci in the now-defunct supergroup The Ravenous and side projects Eat My Fuk and Doomed.

== Autopsy ==
Danny Coralles is the guitarist for the band credited for originating death-doom, Autopsy.

Danny has a signature Autopsy guitar 1 of 2 created by IKON Customs appropriately named "Twisted Mass" pictured.

=== Discography ===
Coralles has featured on all releases by Autopsy, except for their "1987 demo".

== The Ravenous ==
After the break-up of Autopsy Coralles and Reifert joined the death metal supergroup The Ravenous.

=== Discography ===
- Assembled in Blasphemy (Hammerheart Records, 2000)

== Abscess ==
Coralles was the guitarist for the punk-influenced death metal band Abscess. Abscess disbanded in 2010.
