= 2012 in Asian music =

== Events ==
- January – It is announced that the Deutsches Filmorchester Babelsberg will join KM Music Conservatory musicians in a 100-member concert tour of five Indian cities performing compositions by Indian composer A. R. Rahman. The tour, named "Germany and India 2011–2012: Infinite Opportunities'. Classic Incantations", marks the centenary of Indian cinema and of Studio Babelsberg, the world's oldest film studio.
- February 4 – An anti-government rally at Bolotnaya Square, Moscow, is concluded by Yuri Shevchuk with one of his best-known songs, "Rodina" (Motherland).
- February 17 – Start of Season 7 of the music competition Indonesian Idol.
- March 2 – Release of London, Paris, New York, starring Ali Zafar and Aditi Rao Hydari.
- May – Biennial International Morin khuur Festival and competition.
- July 7 – 59th Filmfare Awards South ceremony is held at the Jawaharlal Nehru Stadium, Chennai, India.
- August 24 – Pianist Lang Lang is awarded the Cross of Merit of the Federal Republic of Germany for his engagement in the Schleswig-Holstein Musik Festival.
- September – Chinese pianist Jiayan Sun finishes third in the Leeds International Pianoforte Competition.
- September 27–30 – Darbar Festival takes place in London.
- December 1 – Opening of the 2012 Madras Music Season.

== Albums ==
- Angband – Saved from the Truth
- Arnob – Adheko Ghume
- Buck-Tick – Yume Miru Uchuu
- Tay Kewei – Fallin
- Shiri Maimon – Sheleg Ba'sharav
- Assala Nasri – Qanoun Kaifik
- Krizza Neri – Krizza
- Ramin Rahimi – Persian Percussion Electrified
- Replikas – Biz Burada Yok İken
- Fazıl Say – Istanbul Symphony
- SKE48 – Kono Hi no Chime o Wasurenai
- Wanting Qu – Everything in the World
- Haifa Wehbe – Malikat Jamal Al Kawn

== Classical ==
- Fazıl Say – Symphony No 3 Universe

== Opera ==
- Yin Qing – The Ballad of Canal

== Musical films ==
- Fairy Tail the Movie: Phoenix Priestess (Japan)
- Hoore! Hoore! (Malaysia)
- I Do Bidoo Bidoo: Heto nAPO Sila! (Philippines)
- I Love You (Bangladesh)
- McDull: The Pork of Music (Hong Kong)
- Mihashin Furaana Dhandhen (Maldives)
- Satrangi Re (India)

== Deaths ==
- January 1 – Yafa Yarkoni, Israeli singer, 86
- February 5 – Jiang Ying, Chinese opera singer and music teacher, 92
- March 24 – Jose Prakash, Indian singer and actor, 86
- March 28 – Alexander Arutiunian, Armenian composer, 91
- May 2 – Zvi Zeitlin, Russian violinist and music teacher, 90
- May 29 – Mark Minkov, Russian composer, 67
- June 4 – Eduard Khil, Russian baritone, 77
- June 14 – Hassan Kassai, Iranian Ney player, 83
- July 10 – Viktor Suslin, Russian composer, 70
- July 17 – İlhan Mimaroğlu, Turkish-born American composer and record producer, 86
- October 5 – Edvard Mirzoyan, Armenian composer, 91
- October 8 – Bidit Lal Das, Bengali folk musician and composer, 74
- November 15 – Khin Maung Toe, Burmese singer-songwriter and guitarist, 62 (liver cancer)
- December 11
  - Ravi Shankar, Indian sitar player and composer, 92
  - Galina Vishnevskaya, Russian soprano opera singer and recitalist, 86
- December 20 – Victor Merzhanov, Russian classical pianist, 93

== See also ==
- 2012 in music
- 2012 in Japanese music
- List of 2012 albums
