= Anuang'a Fernando =

Kenyan choreographer and dancer

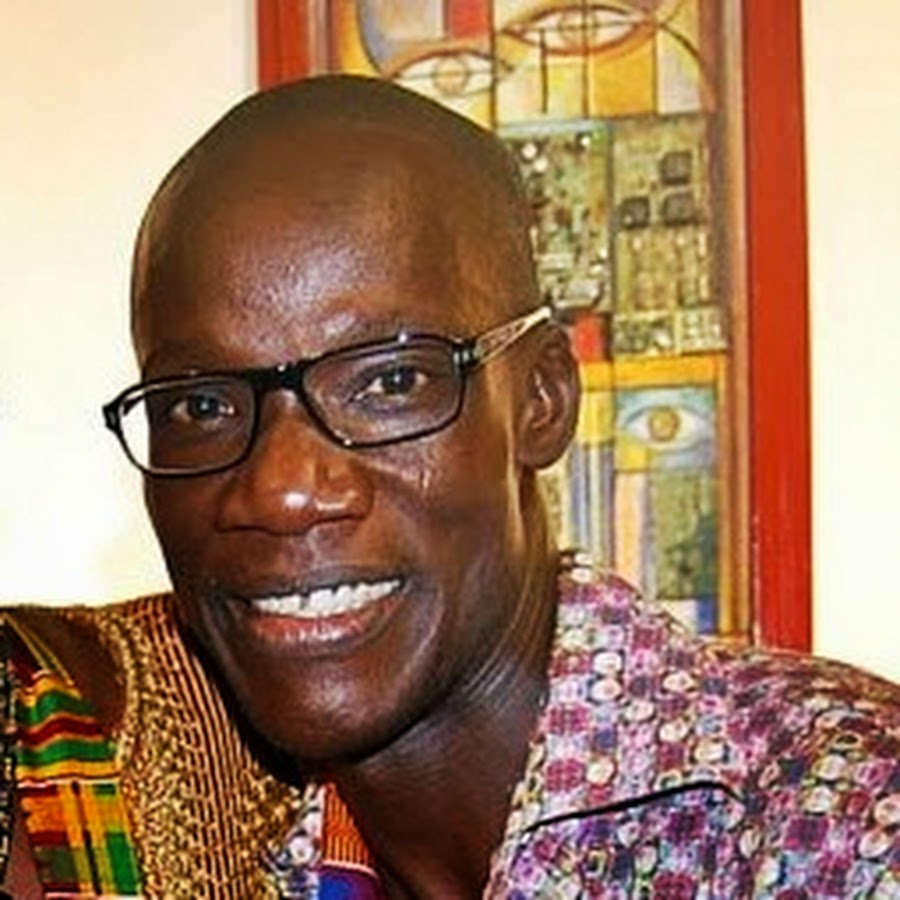
- Born: 12 October 1972 (age 53)
- Occupations: Dancer, Choreographer
- Website: anuanga.com

Anuang'a Fernando is a Kenyan choreographer and dancer, born on October 12, 1972. Growing up in Kitengela and Magadi, he developed interest in Maasai dance and tradition. He is dedicated to the preservation and development of traditional Maasai dance and the fusion of Maasai dance with contemporary styles.

== Career ==
He debut in the dance scene in 1990 as part of the famous Kenyan dance group, Rarewatts. They gained recognition during the win-a-car dance championship held in Nairobi at K.I.C.C, where they emerged as the second-place winners. Rarewatts became well known in Kenya for their unique blend of traditional Maasai dance and modern club moves. To further develop his skills, Anuang'a took part in contemporary and improvisation dance classes conducted by French choreographers Angelin Preljocaj and Carolyn Carlson.

In March 2007, Anuang'a formed his own dance company in Kenya called Maasai Vocals. Comprising seven talented Maasai men, the group aimed to showcase Maasai culture through dance and songs. Maasai Vocals had the privilege of participating in the Pan-African Festival held in Algeria, under the direction of Kamel Ouali. Anuang'a and the group Maasai Vocals produced their show "Voices & Feeling" at Ravenna Festival and Festival Oriente Occidente in Italy.

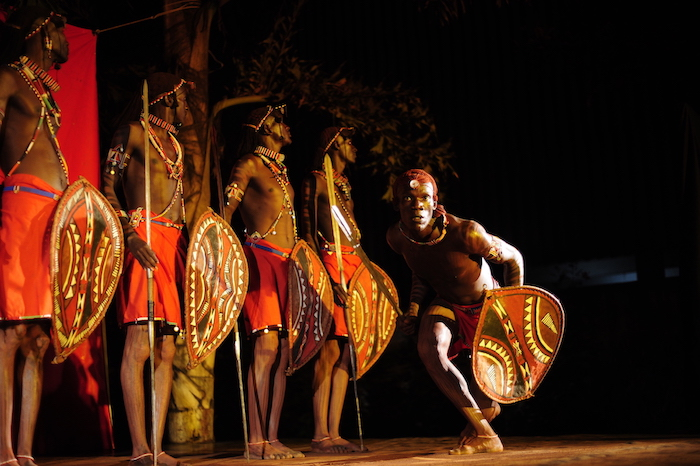
Anuang’a with Maasai Vocals group, March 2008

In July 2008, Anuang'a collaborated with Jaya Pachauri to choreograph a dance spectacle "Fusion Indo-Maasai". This performance fused Indian Kathak dance with Maasai dance, symbolising the meeting of different cultures on a modern stage. In November 2008 his show A journey into the future solo version was produced by Ballet Preljocaj and performed at Pavillon Noir.

In 2010, dance creation entitled Traditional Future after a dance residency in Lamu at Akili studio of British choreographer Wayne Mcgregor. The show was produced by French fashion designer Pierre Cardin and it was staged at Theatre Claude Lévi-Strauss - musée du quai Branly and at the Theatre de la ville, Espace Cardin in Paris.

A performance Collaboration with Jean-François Zygel on Piano "Nuit de l'improvisation" at Theatre Chatelet in Paris. And another collaboration with Choreographer Georges Momboye as a guest artist dancer for the show Empreintes Massai.

His show "ROMO," was a collaboration with Ayub Ogada to express their emotions rooted in tradition in contemporary way.

=== Awards ===
- 1996 Recognition Award by Permanent Presidential Music Commission (Nairobi, Kenya)
- 2012 African heritage Awards 2012 - Lifetime Achievement Award - Outstanding Dancer (Nairobi, Kenya)
- 2015 Outstanding Achievement in Dance (MCSK Awards) (Nairobi, Kenya)

== Main choreographies ==
- 2005, Safari
- 2007, A Journey into the Future
- 2008, Fusion Indo Maasai
- 2009, Voices & Feelings
- 2010, Traditional Future
- 2014, Romo
- 2020, Maasai Footsteps
- 2023, In between Trance

== Dance films ==
- Keeping time and Adumu produced and directed by Steve Woods an Irish Film Maker.
- Featured in Series on contemporary choreographers, "Why do we dance", on Sky TV, produced by Akram Khan.

== Music albums ==
- 2018 Maasai Rhythm & Vocals
- 2021 Maasai Footsteps produced by ARC Music
