= IV (Angband album) =

Studio album by Angband
- Released: July 24, 2020
- Genre: Power metal; progressive metal
- Language: English
- Label: Pure Steel Records
- Producer: Mahyar Dean

Angband chronology
Saved from the Truth (2012)	IV (2020)

IV is the fourth studio album by musical group Angband. This is their debut with the new singer Tim Aymar (Control Denied). The album is released on July 24, 2020, via Pure Steel Records. A lyric video for the song "Nights Of Tehran" was released on July 1, 2020.

== Track listing ==
No.	Title	Lyrics	Music	Length
1.	"Fighters"	Dean	Dean	4:21
2.	"Visions in My Head"	Dean	Dean	4:54
3.	"Atena"	Dean	Dean	4:19
4.	"Mirage"	Dean	Dean	5:09
5.	"Nights of Tehran"	Dean	Dean	5:39
6.	"Insane"	Dean	Dean	4:40
7.	"Cyrus the Great"	Dean	Dean	5:28
8.	"Children of War"	Dean	Dean	4:50
9.	"The Blind Watchmaker"		Dean	3:29

== Personnel ==
- Tim Aymar - vocals
- Mahyar Dean - guitars, bass
- Ramin Rahimi - drums, percussions
- Recorded at Mahyar Dean's home studio & Charse Studio in Tehran
- Vocals Recorded by Adam Fitz at Tonic Recording Studios and
- Michael Proctor at The Doctor's Office Studio in USA
- Mixed & Mastered by Mahyar Dean
- Pasha Hanjani - Nay
- Cover art - Maziar Dean
