= Astrology (disambiguation) =

Astrology is a range of divinatory practices that propose that information about human affairs and terrestrial events may be discerned by studying the apparent positions of celestial objects.

Astrology may also refer to:

- Astrology (album), a 2000 album by Cage
- "Astrology", a 2020 song by Bbno$ and Lentra

== See also ==
- Astronomy
- Astronomy (disambiguation)
