= Mahyar Dean =

Iranian heavy metal musician

Mahyar Mohyeddin / Mahyar Dean مهیار محیی‌الدین
- Born: Tehran, Iran
- Occupations: Musician, composer, guitar instructor, author
- Instruments: Electric guitar, acoustic guitar
- Years active: 2004-present
- Label: Pure Steel
- Member of: Angband
- Website: medium.com/@mahyardean

Mahyar Mohyeddin a.k.a. Mahyar Dean (Persian: مهیار محیی‌الدین) is a musician, guitarist, guitar instructor, author, and founding member of the Iranian/ American heavy metal act Angband, the first such band to be signed to a label.

== Biography ==
Mahyar Mohyeddin was born in Tehran, where he ended playing acoustic and electric guitar. he took lessons in music composition under the mentorship of professor Houshang Ostovar.

== Books ==
He wrote books about the bands Death in 2000 and Testament in 2001.

The book Death, about the band Death and its founder Chuck Schuldiner, was released in Iran in Persian. The book includes bilingual lyrics and many articles about the band. The book was sent through the EmptyWords.org site to Schuldiner, who in his own words was "truly blown away and extremely honored by the obvious work and devotion he put into bringing the book to life".

== The group Angband ==
In 2004, he established the power metal/progressive musical group Angband, which is the first signed metal band from Iran, signed to the Pure Steel label. They have released four albums with Mahyar Dean as the guitarist and producer.

== Works ==
=== Books ===
- Death - (ISBN 964-92534-0-8)
- Testament - (ISBN 964-92534-3-2)

=== Albums with Angband ===
- Rising from Apadana - (2008)
- Visions of the Seeker - (2010)
- Saved from the Truth - (2012)
- IV - (2020)

=== Albums with others ===
- Ramin Rahimi - Persian Percussion Electrified (2012)

== Equipment ==
- Jackson kelly guitar
- Marshall amp
