= The Pulse of Persia =

Album by Ramin Rahimi

Studio album by Ramin Rahimi
- Released: June 29, 2010
- Genre: World music, folk rock
- Length: 59:41
- Label: ARC Music
- Producer: Ramin Rahimi

Ramin Rahimi chronology
Iranian Percussion	The Pulse of Persia	Persian Percussion Electrified

The Pulse of Persia Iranian Rhythms - Global Influences is the sophomore studio album by Ramin Rahimi, released on June 29, 2010 through ARC Music. Ramin Rahimi is also the Drummer of Angband, a power metal/ progressive band.

== Track list ==
No.	Title	Music	Length
1.	"Tornado"	Rahimi	1:02
2.	"Dance"	Rahimi	4:13
3.	"Eastern"	Rahimi, Bin	6:00
4.	"Technical Friendly Conversation"	Rahimi	5:03
5.	"Butterfly"	Raoufi, Rahimi, Bin	4:21
6.	"A Happy Night"	Rahimi	3:31
7.	"D & T"	Rahimi	4:50
8.	"Heart Attack"	Rahimi	7:27
9.	"Passion"	Raoufi, Rahimi, Bin	6:15
10.	"Acceleration"	Rahimi	4:57
11.	"This Is the Daf"	Rahimi	12:02

== Personnel ==
- Ramin Rahimi - Drums, Daf, Tombak, Cajon
- Omid Nik Bin - Bass
- Farid Raoufi - Acoustic guitar
- Alireza Rahimani Fard - congas
- Reza Darband - santur and Barbat
- Pasha Hanjani - ney
- Houmaioun Poshtdar - kamancheh
