= In Aevum Agere =

Italian metal band

In Aevum Agere is an Italian doom metal band. They have released three albums, one of which through Pure Steel Records and the rest through Metal on Metal Records.

== Discography ==
Albums

- The Shadow Tower (2012, Pure Steel Records)
- Canto III (2019, Metal on Metal Records)
- Emperor of Hell - Canto XXXIV (2021, Metal on Metal Records)
- Darkness, Then Light (2024, Metal on Metal Records)
- Ptolomea - Canto XXXIII (2026, Metal on Metal Records)

Singles and EPs

- From the Depth of Soul (2007)
- "Labyrinth of Emptiness" (2009)
- MMXI (2011)
- Limbus Animae (2014, Pure Steel Records)
- Fugit in Solitudine (2016)
