= Visions of the Seeker =

Studio album by Angband
- Released: October 29, 2010
- Genre: Power metal; progressive metal
- Length: 42:06
- Language: English
- Label: Pure Steel Records
- Producer: Mahyar Dean

Angband chronology
Rising from Apadana (2008)	Visions of the Seeker (2010)	Saved from the Truth (2012)

Visions of the Seeker is the second studio album by Angband, the power metal/progressive metal musical group, released on October 29, 2010, through Pure Steel Records. The album was mixed and mastered by the veteran producer/sound engineer Achim Kohler. The video clip for the song "Forsaken Dreams" was released in November 2011.

== Track listing ==
No.	Title	Music	Length
1.	"Forgotten Glory"	Dean	2:16
2.	"Blind Anger"	Dean	5:14
3.	"Battle For ..."	Dean	5:41
4.	"The Seeker"	Yazdani/Dean	5:50
5.	"Easy to Believe"	Dean	5:23
6.	"Forsaken Dreams"	Dean	4:54
7.	"Truth of Life"	Dean	5:30
8.	"Fate & the Fear"	Dean	5:00
9.	"Astral Hallucinations"	Yazdani	2:14

== Reception ==
The Lords of Metal webzine noticed the band's slight progress in songwriting, as well as their musicianship. It commented that "the album also shows a highly talented band that, thanks to their background, have also managed to come up with a sound of their own."

Professional ratings
Review scores
Source	Rating
Metal Integral	4.5/5 stars
Lords of Metal	(74/100)
Metal Glory	(8/10)

== Personnel ==
- Mahyar Dean – electric guitar
- Ashkan Yazdani – vocals
- Ramin Rahimi – drums
- M. Halaji – bass guitar
- Produced by Mahyar Dean
- Rhythm guitars engineered and recorded by Mahyar Dean
- Other instruments and vocals engineered by Omid Nik Bin
- Recorded at Rahgozar Studio, Tehran
- Mixed and mastered at Indiscreet Audio studio
- Engineered by Achim Kohler
- Cover art by Maziar Dean
