= Speed Limit (band) =

Austrian band

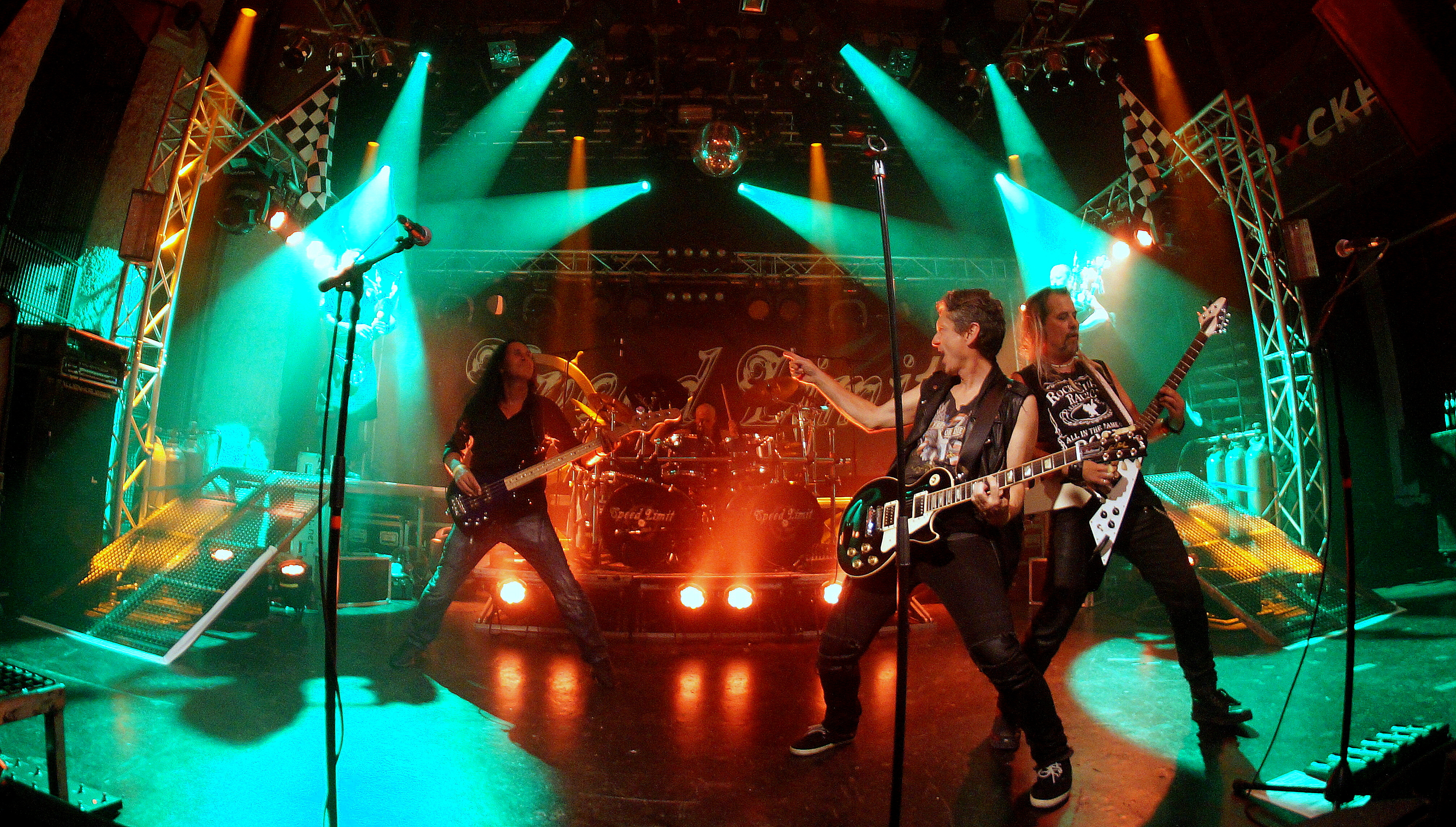
- Speed Limit live 2017

Background information
- Origin: Salzburg, Austria
- Genres: Heavy Metal; Hard Rock
- Years active: 1984–1994, 2008–present
- Members: Chris Angerer; Chris Pawlak; Joe Eder; Hannes Vordermayer; Hannes Vordermayer
- Website: speedlimitweb.com

Speed Limit is an Austrian heavy metal band from Salzburg. It was founded in 1984 and dissolved in 1994. It was reformed in 2008 and has been active ever since. In 1988 their single Lady charted in seven countries across Europe and the accompanying music video was aired internationally.

The band's style is a mixture of hard rock, melodic metal and classic heavy metal.

== History ==
=== 1984 to 1994: Founding, international fame and disbandment ===
The band's modern incarnation came about when an identically named precursor band and the local Salzburg band Ampere merged in 1984. Guitarist Chris Angerer and Bassist Chris Pawlak formed the backbone of the group, while other positions changed rapidly. In 1989 guitarist Joe Eder joined the two and has remained a member ever since.

In their early years the band played locally and released their first record Unchained in 1986. Their EP Prophecy garnered wider attention and their single Lady was an international hit, in part due to its music video. The band toured in Germany, the Netherlands, Belgium, Italy and Hungary. A jury of the austrian youth magazine Rennbahn Express, including Gene Simmons of Kiss and Bruce Dickinson of Iron Maiden, named them Best Austrian Metal Act in 1989.

In the following years the band kept playing in Austria and southern Germany, but their second record Perfect Inspiration couldn't replicate their earlier success. From 1992 onwards the band experienced frequent changes in its line-up. Since interest in Heavy Metal itself appeared to fade during the 1990s, the remaining members agreed to dissolve the band in 1994.

=== 2008 to 2022: Reunion and modest success ===
In 2008, the group's 1989 line-up (except for drummer Andy Rethmeier) reuinted and did a show opening for Nazareth in April 2008 in Salzburg. They continued touring, opening for Uriah Heep and Manfred Mann's Earth Band, played a show at the Austria Rock Festival in Klagenfurt and headlined shows in southern Germany and Austria. They got signed by Pure Steel Records and released their comeback album Moneyshot in 2010, which charted for 12 weeks. Their first album and EP got re-released the year after.

In 2012, singer Steven Hogger left the band unexcepectedly. His successor Ritchie Krennmaier only lasted until 2014 and left together with drummer Wolf Krug. Searching for replacements took some time, which is why the group's next record Anywhere We Dare only released in 2017. It was their heaviest record to date, according to the band. Their new vocalist left the band the same year, which now continued as a quartet, with drummer Hannes Vordermayer providing vocals ever since.

=== 2023 an onward: Return to Former Strength ===
In December 2022, the band signed a record deal with NRT-Records. In 2023, they released their sixth album Cut a Long Story Short, which once again featured strong influences from the 1980s. The album was self-produced and mixed by Christoph Stickel. It remained in the top 10 of the German metal and rock charts for several weeks, with the single Shine Brighter Than the Sun reaching third place and being featured for several weeks in the top 10 of the iTunes and Amazon Sales Charts.

The following year, Speed Limit released the album The Broken Record: Chorus Sound Tapes 1990, which was originally intended to be the band's second album, but was withheld by the record company at the time. The album includes previously unreleased tracks as well as the original versions of various songs that were released later. One week later they released the EP New Horizon, featuring Songs from Cut A Long Story Short and live recordings of the legendary songs Lady and Dead Eyes from the album Prophecy.

== Discography ==
=== Albums ===
- 1986: Unchained, Die Mühle Soundrecording
- 1992: Perfect Inspiration, Kick Records/Selfpublished
- 2010: Moneyshot, Pure Rock Records
- 2011: Unchained/Prophecy (Remaster), Karthago Records
- 2017: Anywhere We Dare, Pure Rock Records
- 2023: Cut A Long Story Short, NRT-Records
- 2024: The Broken Record, NRT-Records

=== EPs ===
- 1988: Prophecy, Breaking Records
- 2023: Hit The Wall, NRT-Records
- 2023: Shine Brighter Than The Sun, NRT-Records
- 2024: New Horizon, NRT-Records
