= Hell Destroyer =

Studio album by Cage
- Released: May 22, 2007
- Recorded: 2007
- Genre: Christian metal; heavy metal; thrash metal; power metal
- Length: 1:18:22
- Label: Destroy All
- Producer: Richard Carr

Cage chronology
Darker Than Black (2003)	Hell Destroyer (2007)	Science of Annihilation (2009)

Hell Destroyer is the fourth album by the heavy metal band Cage.

== Critical reception ==
Professional ratings
Review scores
Source	Rating
New Release Today	5/5 stars
Brave Words	8.5
Blabbermouth	9/10
Metallized	70%
Metal Storm	8.2

Mark Gromen of Brave Words praised the album saying "Easily my favourite Cage disc since Unveiled!" Scott Alisoglu of Blabbermouth.net stated "Heavy metal concept albums are hit or miss propositions.....There are very few albums that can claim to be as quintessentially heavy metal as Hell Destroyer.

Steen of RevelationZ felt the album to be lovingly crafted and perfected down to the very last note.

Michael Wuensch of Lastrit.es stated "2007 has seen a number of traditional metal bands releasing top-ten contenders, but the power end of the spectrum has been relatively quiet. There's been a few challengers but Cage has definitely delivered a paragon in spades with this release.''

== Track listing ==
No.	Title	Length
1.	"Descension"	0:44
2.	"Hell Destroyer"	3:45
3.	"I Am the King"	4:45
4.	"The Circle of Light"	0:46
5.	"Christ Hammer"	6:01
6.	"Born in Blood"	5:17
7.	"Abomination"	5:20
8.	"Inauguration"	0:44
9.	"Rise of the Beast"	5:41
10.	"Cremation of Care"	0:48
11.	"Bohemian Grove"	3:58
12.	"Final Proclamation"	0:23
13.	"From Death to Legend"	4:38
14.	"Legion of Demons"	7:52
15.	"Betrayal"	1:20
16.	"Fall of the Angels"	4:21
17.	"Fire and Metal"	3:19
18.	"Beyond the Apocalypse"	6:18
19.	"The Lords of Chaos"	1:02
20.	"Metal Devil"	5:35
21.	"King Diamond"	5:45
Total length:		1:18:22

== Personnel ==
Cage

- Sean Peck – vocals, executive producer
- Dave Garcia – guitars, keyboards, executive producer
- Anthony Wayne McGinnis – guitars
- Michael Giordano – bass
- Mikey Niel – drums

Production

- Richard Carr – producer, engineering, recording
- Gavin Lurssen – mastering
- Gabriel Wallach – mastering
- Marc Sasso – cover art, layout, design
