= Persian Percussion Electrified =

Studio album by Ramin Rahimi
- Released: November 19, 2012
- Genre: World music, Persian Folk music
- Length: 78:23
- Label: ARC Music
- Producer: Ramin Rahimi, Mahyar Dean

Ramin Rahimi chronology
The Pulse of Persia (2010)	Persian Percussion Electrified (2012)

Persian Percussion Electrified is the third studio album by Ramin Rahimi, drummer for the power metal act Angband. The album was released on November 19, 2012, through ARC Music. It features Mahyar Dean and Farshad Shokuhfar from Angband as well as many other professional musicians.

== Track listing ==
No.	Title	Music	Length
1.	"For Your Love"	Rahimi
2.	"Crazy for Tomorrow"	Rahimi
3.	"Warm Cozy Club"	Rahimi
4.	"Sumerian Dance"	Rahimi
5.	"Southern Dream"	Rahimi
6.	"Let’s play together"	Rahimi
7.	"When a Gypsy Loves a Persian Girl"	Rahimi
8.	"Listen to me and play it!"	Rahimi
9.	"Wake up at 6 a.m!"	Rahimi
10.	"I stand Alone"	Rahimi
11.	"For Your Love (rock version)"	Rahimi
12.	"Let’s play together (rock version)"	Rahimi

== Personnel ==
- Ramin Rahimi - Drums and percussions
- Farshad Shokuhfar - Bass
- Mahyar Dean - Electric Guitar
- Reza Darbandi - Santour, Barbat
- Milad Derakhshani - Tar
- Farid Raoufi - Acoustic Guitar
- Pouria Zarrabi - Flamenco Guitar
- Homayoun Poshtdar - Kamancheh
- Parsa Ehteshami - Ney
- Sohrab Darabi - Congas
- Mohsen Sharifian - Ney-Anban
- Ehsan Abdi Pour - Sorna
- Nazanin Rahimi - Soprano
- Nazanin Zahedi - Soprano
- Taraneh Saeedi - Soprano
- Produced by Ramin Rahimi and Mahyar Dean
- Recorded at Rahgozar studio, Tehran
- Sound engineered by Soheil Saeedi
- Mixed by Farshad Shokuhfar
- Mastered by Diz Heller
- Cover design by Sara Ash
