= Play It Loud! =

Play It Loud! may refer to:

- "Play It Loud!", a Nintendo advertising campaign
- Play It Loud! Festival, a heavy metal festival in Italy
