= Italian History VI =

Studio album by Alltheniko
- Released: September 15, 2017
- Genre: Heavy metal
- Length: 56:45
- Label: Pure Steel Records
- Producer: Alltheniko

Alltheniko chronology
Fast and Glorious (2014)	Italian History VI (2017)

Singles from Italian History VI
- 1. "Emblema" Released: September 19, 2017

Italian History VI is the sixth album by the Italian heavy metal band Alltheniko, released in 2017 via Pure Steel Records.

The band itself was responsible for the production. Guitarist Joe Boneshaker designed the cover and layout of the CD booklet. The album contains two tracks in Italian: Emblema, which was also released as a single via SoundCloud, and the title song. Worldwide distribution is handled by Soulfood.

== Reception ==
Professional ratings
Review scores
Source	Rating
Heavy Metal Pages	3.5/6
Rock Hard	5.5/10

Heavy Metal Pages’ Adam Widełka stated: "The Swiddling soloist will once and again fly in the left ear and fly out the right, and percussion canonade snatches from the sleep of even the dead [...] this is quite a decent music, still given in a very noisy way.

Rock Hard’s Wolfram Küper called the album "perhaps the most aggressive and fastest, but certainly not the best. Quite unrestrained and sometimes a little chaotic they move [...] between Power- and Speed metal".

Other European print magazines with reviews include, i.e., Scream from Norway, Powerplay Magazine from England, and World Of Metal Magazine from Portugal.

During week 41 in 2017 renowned Metal Express Radio to feature the album as one of the daily premieres with two longer features a day. In the corresponding review Daniel Waters took a deeper look at the whole album and commented on every single song. In his conclusion he stated: "2017 has been a fine year for Italian Heavy Metal and Italian History VI adds to that encouraging trend of success."

Heavy Metal Webzine from Italy highlighted how balanced the group is: "alchemy, balance and an almost perfect communion of musical intentions". The Italian magazine metallized.it came to the conclusion: „a real guarantee in the industry“. Austrian Online magazine Stormbringer.at called the album "a gallant cuvée of power, speed, prog and thrash metal [...] Hard as nails the sound, smooth the songwriting. There's not much to complain about here." The worldwide online magazine Metal Temple came to the conclusion: "Overall, this is a world-class release of awesome songs that is expertly produced. Play this at a party, it is a rocking soundtrack to really good time; I highly recommend this album."

More online reviews were published, among other countries, in Germany (Metal 1: "make music at a high level", 7,5/10; Powermetal.de: "a great piece of Heavy Metal, 8,5/10), France (Soil Chronicles: "power metal/speed metal full of energy and technique", 7/10), Greece (Metal Zone: "recommended to those who are nostalgic for power", 75%) and Switzerland (Metal Factory: "Holy cow!", 9,0/10).

== Track listing ==
No.	Title	Writer(s)	Length
1.	"Man on the Edge"	Alltheniko	4:27
2.	"Respect and Fight"	Alltheniko	3:45
3.	"Emblema"	Alltheniko	4:16
4.	"Waste of Time"	Alltheniko	3:48
5.	"Pain to Play"	Alltheniko	4:55
6.	"Denier"	Alltheniko	4:55
7.	"Like a Fake"	Alltheniko	3:50
8.	"Italian History VI"	Alltheniko	5:11
9.	"Propaganda"	Alltheniko	2:23

== Personnel ==
Alltheniko

- Dave Nightfight – vocals, bass guitar
- Joe Boneshaker – guitars
- Luke the Idol – drums
