= Rising from Apadana =

Studio album by Angband
- Released: August 29, 2008
- Genres: Power metal Progressive metal
- Length: 36:12
- Language: English
- Label: Pure Steel Records
- Producer: Mahyar Dean

Angband chronology
Rising from Apadana (2008)	Visions of the Seeker (2010)

Rising from Apadana is the first studio album by Angband, a power metal musical group from Tehran, released on August 29, 2008, through Pure Steel Records.

== Track listing ==
No.	Title	Lyrics	Music	Length
1.	"Incarnation of Truth"	Dean	Dean	5:12
2.	"Lighter Days"	Dean	Dean	5:42
3.	"The Eyes"		Dean	1:52
4.	"Flaming Sight"	Dean	Dean	6:59
5.	"Before the End of Time"	Dean	Dean	5:39
6.	"Look into the Abyss"	Dean	Dean/Yazdani	5:49
7.	"The King's Command"		Dean	6:37

== Reception ==
The album was well received. Many magazines and webzines were excited to see a signed Power Metal band from Iran where rock/metal musicians have serious obstacles.

Professional ratings
Review scores
Source	Rating
Fury Rocks	(7.5/10)
Osna Metal	4/5 stars
Metal Glory	(7.5/10)
Sleaze Metal	4/5 stars
Metal to Infinity	(89/100)

== Personnel ==
- Mahyar Dean – electric guitar, bass guitar
- Ashkan Yazdani – vocals
- Ramin Rahimi – drums
- Produced by Mahyar Dean
- Sound engineered and mixed by Omid Nik Bin, at Rahgozar studio, Tehran
- Mastered by Rocco Stellmacher
- Cover arts by Maziar Dean
