= Astronomy (disambiguation) =

Astronomy is a science that studies celestial objects and the cosmos.

Astronomy may also refer to:

== Music ==
=== Albums ===
- Astronomy (Bleach album), 2003
- Astronomy (Dragonland album), 2006

=== Songs ===
- "Astronomy" (Blue Öyster Cult song), 1974
- "Astronomy" (Conan Gray song), 2022

== Publications ==
- Astronomy (journal), a Swiss academic journal
- Astronomy (magazine), an American magazine

== Other uses ==
- "Astronomy", an episode of the television series QI

== See also ==
- Astrology
- Astrology (disambiguation)
