= Zandelle =

American power metal band

Zandelle was a US power metal band. The band released two albums on Limb Music and three on Pure Steel Records.

The band was formed by vocalist George Tsalikis in 1996, after he had left Gothic Knights.

== Discography ==
- Zandelle (EP, 1996)
- Shadows of Reality (1998)
- Twilight on Humanity (2002, Limb Music)
- Vengeance Rising (2006, Limb Music)
- Flames of Rage (2009, Pure Steel Records)
- Shadows of the Past (compilation, 2011, Pure Steel Records)
- Perseverance (2015, Pure Steel Records)
