= Phantom-x =

American metal band

- Origin: Dallas, Texas, U.S.
- Genres: Heavy metal, power metal
- Years active: 2004–present
- Labels: Pure Steel, Mausoleum, Perris
- Spinoff of: Omen
- Members: Kevin Goocher; Glenn Malicki; Bill Engfer; Reese Stanley
- Past members: Russell D. Contreras; Eric Knudson; Dave Harvey; Richard Tull; Steve Nichols; Danny White

Phantom-x is an American heavy metal and power metal band from Dallas, Texas. The band was formed in 2004 by Omen vocalist Kevin Goocher and bassist Glenn Malicki.

== Biography ==
Kevin Goocher, vocalist of heavy metal band Omen, formed Phantom-x with bass player Glenn Malicki while Omen was on a two-year hiatus. The group began as a Ronnie James Dio tribute band called Stargazer who performed locally in the Dallas/Ft. Worth metropolitan area. Goocher and Malicki began writing original material for the group, and subsequently renamed the group Phantom-x.

Phantom-x signed with Mausoleum Records in July 2005, and released their debut album, Rise of the Phantom, in early November of that year. The album included guest vocal appearances from Robert Lowe (Candlemass, Solitude Aeturnus) and Jason McMaster (Watchtower, Dangerous Toys). Portions of the album, labeled in chapters, introduce a fantasy story about a demon who rises to power. Rise of the Phantom peaked at number 7 on the German heavy metal charts.

The release of Rise of the Phantom coincided with the band's 2005 European tour with Canadian heavy metal band Anvil. The tour, set up by an inexperienced booking agent, was poorly promoted, and fraught with logistical and financial problems. Footage from this tour, including the Phantom-x song "Pain Machine", is featured in the documentary Anvil! The Story of Anvil (2008).

In 2006, Phantom-x released a follow-up album entitled Storm Riders. The album adds an additional three chapters to the story begun on Rise of the Phantom. The band then toured to support the album.

In 2008, Kevin Goocher and his daughter, Devon Goocher, appeared in I Know My Kid's a Star, a reality television show hosted by former child actor Danny Bonaduce. The show debuted on VH1 March 20, and aired for one season.

In 2009, Reece Stanley and Bill Engfer joined Phantom-x, solidifying what had previously been a revolving lineup on guitar and drums. The band released This Is War on Perris Records in 2010, which again included chapters on the albums' ongoing story. The band's first headlining tour was in promotion of this album.

In 2012, Phantom-x signed with Pure Steel Records. The label released the group's fourth album, The Opera of the Phantom, on August 31. The Opera of the Phantom compiles the chapters of the entire fantasy story from the previous albums, and adds new chapters that complete the concept. The album also includes another three new songs that are unrelated to the story.

== Members ==
=== Current members ===
- Kevin Goocher – vocals (2004–present)
- Glenn Malicki – bass (2004–present)
- Bill Engfer – guitar (2009–present)
- Reese Stanley – drums (2009–present)

=== Previous members ===
- Russell D. Contreras – guitar
- Eric Knudson – guitar
- Dave Harvey – guitar
- Richard Tull – guitar
- Steve Nichols – drums
- Danny White – drums

== Discography ==
Year	Title	Label
2005	Rise of the Phantom	Mausoleum Records
2006	Storm Riders	Mausoleum Records
2010	This Is War	Perris Records
2012	The Opera of the Phantom	Pure Steel Records
