= Tim Aymar =

American singer (1963–2023)

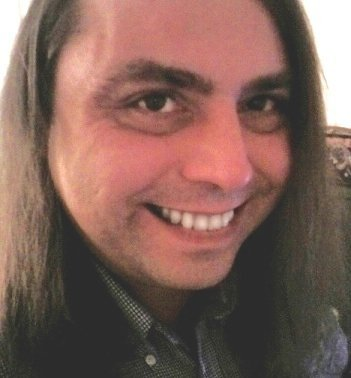

Background information
- Born: Timothy L. Aymar; September 4, 1963; Pittsburgh, Pennsylvania, U.S.
- Origin: Pittsburgh, Pennsylvania, U.S.
- Died: February 13, 2023 (aged 59) New Kensington, Pennsylvania, U.S.
- Genres: Heavy metal; progressive metal; power metal
- Occupation: Singer
- Years active: 1985–2023
- Labels: Cruz Del Sur; Nuclear Blast; Relapse
- Formerly of: Control Denied, Pharaoh, Angband, Triple-X
- Website: www.facebook.com/tim.aymar.metal www.solarflight.net www.emptywords.org

Timothy Lee Aymar (September 4, 1963 – February 13, 2023) was an American heavy metal singer. He was best known as the vocalist of progressive metal band Pharaoh and for his work with Chuck Schuldiner in Control Denied. His rise to fame began with his band, Triple-X.

== Career ==
Aymar had been a vocalist since 1985 with the band 313. He later joined Triple X and released an album with them. He joined Psycho Scream, where his bandmate Jim Dofka introduced him to the music of Chuck Schuldiner and his band Death. Schuldiner had heard Psycho Scream and contacted Dofka, asking Aymar to join his band Control Denied. After a three-song audition, he joined Schuldiner's as the vocalist. He was known for his strong vocals in that band.

== Death ==
Aymar died in February 2023, at the age of 59.

== Awards ==
Aymar's band Triple-X won the In Pittsburgh Music Awards for Best Metal Band in 1990, and was the first regional band to be awarded a national sponsorship, which was from Anheuser-Busch/Budweiser Anheuser-Busch.

== Discography ==
=== With 313 ===
- 313 Album 'Three Thirteen' released on CD by Divebomb Records in early 2019.

This was released on vinyl in 2020.

=== With Triple X ===
- Bang (full-length, 1991)

=== With Control Denied ===
- 1997 demo
- The Fragile Art of Existence (full-length, 1999)

=== With Psycho Scream ===
- Spring '94 Limited Edition (demo, 1994)
- Virtual Insanity (full-length 1994)
- Demo 1996 (demo, 1996)

=== With Pharaoh ===
- After the Fire (2003)
- The Longest Night (2005)
- Be Gone (2008)
- Ten Years (EP) (2011)
- Bury the Light (2012)
- The Powers That Be (2021)

=== With Vicious Cycle ===
- Burrn (demo, 2002)

=== With Advent of Bedlam ===
- Flesh Over God (full-length, 2012)

=== With Xthirt13n ===
- A Taste of the Light (full-length, 2014)

=== With Art X ===
- The Redemption of Cain (guest vocals, 2016)

=== With Angband ===
- IV (full-length, 2020)
