= Hossam Ramzy =

Egyptian percussionist and composer (1953–2019)

Hossam Ramzy حسام رمزي
- Born: 15 December 1953; Cairo, Egypt
- Died: 10 September 2019 (aged 65) Brazil
- Instruments: Traditional Egyptian Darbuka, Zills, The Mazhar
- Years active: 1970–2019
- Label: ARC Music

Hossam Ramzy (Arabic: حسام رمزي; 15 December 1953 – 10 September 2019) was an Egyptian percussionist and composer. He worked with English artists including Jimmy Page and Robert Plant, Siouxsie Sioux, as well as with Arabic music artists like Rachid Taha and Khaled.

== Early life and career ==
Ramzy was born into a wealthy Cairo family. He began playing the traditional Egyptian Tabla goblet drum at an early age. In the 1970s he moved to London and began playing with saxophonist Andy Sheppard. His collaborations with jazz musicians earned him the nickname "The Sultan of Swing". In 1989 he worked with Peter Gabriel on the soundtrack to Martin Scorsese's The Last Temptation of Christ. This brought him to the attention of artists Frank Asher and the Gipsy Kings.

In 1994 he returned to his roots and formed a ten-piece Egyptian ensemble that performed on the album No Quarter: Jimmy Page and Robert Plant Unledded. Ramzy and his ensemble also gained exposure by touring with Plant and Page throughout 1995 in support of their album. The next year Ramzy released the first of three collaborations with English arranger Phil Thornton, Eternal Egypt. The success of Eternal Egypt's blend of Traditional Egyptian music prompted the follow-up albums Immortal Egypt and Enchanted Egypt. In 1996, Hossam and his percussion section played with Big Country in Dingwalls club, and the live album Eclectic was released. In 1998, he performed with Rachid Taha, Khaled and Faudel at their 1,2,3 Soleils concert and backed Khaled again for the Claude Challe album Flying Carpet.

In 2000, Timbaland sampled his version of "Khosara", an Egyptian song by Abdel Halim Hafez, for the Jay-Z song "Big Pimpin'". After 2000 Ramzy increasingly began to work arranging music for pop stars. In 2005 he arranged some songs for Ricky Martin's album Life and he worked with Shakira on her album She Wolf. He also contributed two songs to the soundtrack for the film Prince of Persia and one to the soundtrack for Conan the Barbarian.

His last album titled Rock the Tabla released on 30 August 2011. It features Indian composer A. R. Rahman, Omar Faruk Tekbilek, Manu Katché and Billy Cobham.

== Personal life ==
Hossam lived in London and Cairo. He is survived by his three children Louvaine, Omayma and Amir. He made a cameo appearance in the 1993 film Son of the Pink Panther.

== Awards ==
- 1999 New Age Voice Award for Best Contemporary World Music for Immortal Egypt

== Selected discography ==
- 1989 - Passion (Peter Gabriel)
- 1994 - No Quarter
- 1994 - Best of Farid Al Atrash (ARC Music)
- 1994 - Best of Abdul Halim Hafiz (ARC Music)
- 1994 - Best of Oum Kalthoum (ARC Music)
- 1994 - Best of Mohammed Abdul Wahab (ARC Music)
- 1994 - Baladi Plus (ARC Music)
- 1994 - Sultaan (ARC Music)
- 1995 - Egyptian Rai (ARC Music)
- 1995 - Source of Fire (ARC Music)
- 1996 - Gamaal Rawhany (Soulful Beauty) - an album of Modern Egyptian Belly Dance (ARC Music)
- 1996 - Eternal Egypt
- 1996 - Ahlamy - with saxophonist Rafat Misso (ARC Music)
- 1996 - Eclectic - with Big Country (Castle Music)
- 1997 - Best of Hossam Ramzy
- 1998 - Messiah Meets Progenitor
- 1998 - Ro-He - with Essam Rashad (ARC Music)
- 1998 - Rhythms of the Nile (ARC Music)
- 1998 - Immortal Egypt
- 2000 - Amar
- 2000 - Sabla Tolo — Journeys into Pure Egyptian Percussion (ARC Music)
- 2002 - Faddah (ARC Music)
- 2002 - Qanun El Tarab (ARC Music)
- 2003 - Flamenco Arabe (ARC Music)
- 2003 - Hossam Ramzy Presents Egyptian Sufi Sheikh Mohamed Al Helbawy (ARC Music)
- 2003 - Hossam Ramzy Presents Dalinda - Turquoise (ARC Music)
- 2004 - Enchanted Egypt
- 2007 - Bedouin Tribal Dance (ARC Music)
- 2007 - Secrets of the Eye (ARC Music)
- 2007 - Sabla Tolo II (ARC Music)
- 2008 - Sabla Tolo III (ARC Music)
- 2009 - Ruby (ARC Music)
- 2011 - Rock the Tabla (ARC Music)
- 2013 - Songs from Libya (ARC Music)
