= Saved from the Truth =

Studio album by Angband
- Released: September 28, 2012
- Genre: Power metal; progressive metal
- Language: English
- Label: Pure Steel Records
- Producer: Mahyar Dean

Angband chronology
| Visions of the Seeker (2010) | Saved from the Truth (2012) | IV (2020) |

Saved from the truth is the third studio album by Persian power metal act Angband released on September 28, 2012 through Pure Steel Records. as was the case with their previous album the mixing and mastering was handled by well-known producer Achim Kohler (Primal Fear, Amon Amarth).

== Track listing ==
| No. | Title | Length |
|---|---|---|
| 1. | "Seasons of My Pain" |
| 2. | "Fight for Life" |
| 3. | "Man of the New Time" |
| 4. | "Saved from the Truth" |
| 5. | "Angel" |
| 6. | "Persia" |
| 7. | "Kill the Hatred" |
| 8. | "Fearless Dream" |
| 9. | "Bitter Truth" |

== Reception ==
Professional ratings
Review scores
| Source | Rating |
|---|---|
| Mega Metal | 8/10 |
| Lords of metal | 76/100 |

The album received generally positive reviews from music critics.

Lords of Metal magazine believes that: "the prog-influences have gained much more room on this album...on 'Saved From The Truth’ the gentlemen show progress on all fronts. musically this is the band's strongest release to date."

== Personnel ==
- Mahyar Dean - guitars
- Ashkan Yazdani - vocals
- Ramin Rahimi - drums and percussions
- Farshad Shokuhfar - bass
- Produced by Mahyar Dean
- Sound engineered by Soheil Saeedi
- Recorded at Rahgoar Studio, Tehran
- Mixed and mastered by Achim Kohler at Indiscreet Audio
- Cover art by Maziar Dean
- Photos by M. Porooshani
