= Steelpreacher =

German metal band

Steelpreacher is a German heavy metal band. They have released seven albums.

The band hails from Koblenz.

== Discography ==
- Route 666 (2002)
- Start Raising Hell (2004)
- Drinking with the Devil (2008)
- Hellraiser (2011)
- Devilution (2015)
- Masters of the Underground (split DVD with Dragonsfire and Secutor, 2021)
- Back from Hell (2021)
- Gimme Some Metal (2025)

== External link ==
- Discogs

=== Further reading ===
- Review of Drinking with the Devil by Darkscene.at (in German)
- Review of Devilution by Metal Temple
- Review of Devilution (reissue) by Metal Temple
- Review of Devilution by Stormbringer.at (in German)
- Review of Devilution by Time for Metal (in German)
- Review of Devilution by Obliveon (in German)
- Review of Devilution by Crossfire Metal (in German)

- Review of Back from Hell by Metal Temple
- Review of Back from Hell by Time for Metal (in German)
- Review of Back from Hell by Stormbringer.at (in German)
- Review of Back from Hell by Darkscene.at (in German)
- Review of Back from Hell by Metal Factory (in German)

- Review of Gimme Some Metal by Metal Temple
- Review of Gimme Some Metal by Time for Metal (in German)
- Review of Gimme Some Metal by FFM-Rock (in German)
- Review of Gimme Some Metal by Hellfire-Magazin (in German)
