= Salem (British rock band) =

English hard rock band

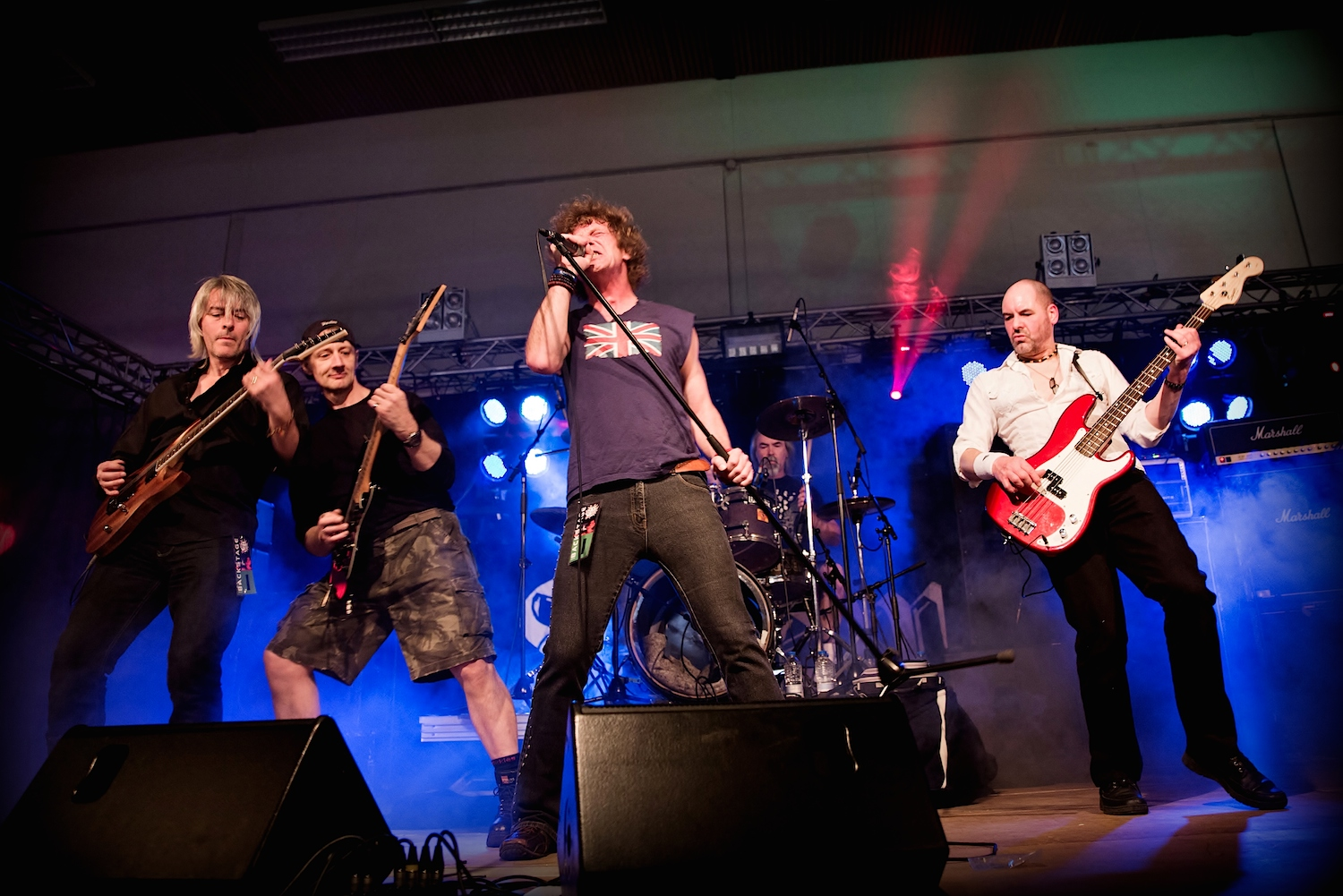
- Salem at Very 'Eavy Festival, Netherlands, 2014

Background information
- Origin: Hull, England
- Genres: Hard rock, heavy metal
- Years active: 1979–1983, 2009–present
- Labels: High Roller, Pure Steel, Dissonance
- Spinoff of: Ethel the Frog
- Members: Simon Saxby; Adrian Jenkinson; Francis Gill; Dave Megginson
- Past members: Paul Tognola; Paul Conyers; Ricky Squires; Ollie Davis; Paul Macnamara; Paul Mendham; Mark Allison

Salem is a hard rock/heavy metal band from Hull, England. It was formed following the split of the new wave of British heavy metal band Ethel the Frog. Salem recorded three demos and a single in the early 1980s; a compilation album of these recordings was released in 2010.

The band re-formed (aka Salem UK) in 2009 and has since released two new EPs, New Tricks and X Rated, and the albums Forgotten Dreams (2013), Dark Days (2016) and Attrition (2018).

Salem has also filmed two videos and has played numerous festivals and gigs in the UK, across Europe and beyond.

A re-mastered and rearranged edition of the 2010 In the Beginning ... album was released in July 2015. Dark Days was met with rave reviews and considered one of the top albums of 2016.

== Career ==
=== 1979–1983 ===
Salem was founded in late 1979 by two members of Ethel the Frog, Paul Tognola (vocals/guitar) and Paul Conyers (drums), with Adrian Jenkinson (bass) and Paul Macnamara (lead guitar). The first band met up on 2 January 1980 in The Red Lion pub in Anlaby, East Riding of Yorkshire. After a period of song writing and rehearsal, Salem gigged regularly and built a solid following in the Hull area. They recorded their first demo at Fairview Studios, Willerby in January 1981.

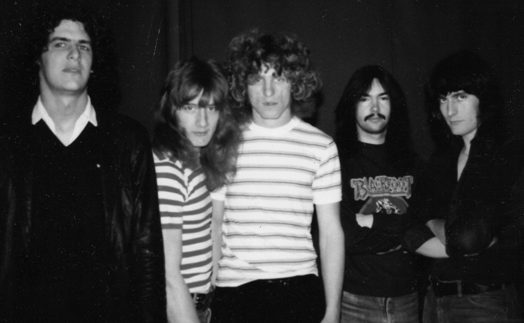
Salem in 1983

Soon after this first demo, Tognola left the band to be replaced by Simon Saxby as the new singer and later in the year by Mark Allison as the second guitarist. With this new line-up, Salem released its double A-side single, "Cold As Steel"/"Reach To Eternity", recorded again at Fairview on 4 April 1982; this is considered to be one of the notable recordings from Fairview. Following the interview with Macnamara in the May 1982 Kerrang! (No. 15), the single appeared in the 'local chart' section of the magazine and singles were sold globally. According to the NWOBHM Encyclopaedia, the single is now "a highly collectable and valuable rarity", and is also listed in Record Collector's "Rare Record Price Guide".

Salem continued with a new drummer Paul Mendham to perform in the North and North East of England and recorded another demo in September 1982, at Adda Studios in East Hull. As a result of their winning a Battle of bands competition at Huddersfield Polytechnic, Salem recorded the final demo at September Sound, Huddersfield, in March 1983.

Salem played their final gig on 31 May 1983, when the members left to follow different projects.

=== 2009–present ===
==== In the Beginning ... (2010) ====
In 2009, Macnamara was approached to release all of the band's 1980s recordings. After getting back in touch with all Salem band members, the double album compilation In the Beginning ... was released in June 2010 on High Roller Records (LP) and Pure Steel Records (CD).

Salem reformed with the same 1983 line-up and played their first performance in 27 years in hometown Hull at The Adelphi on 20 November 2010, the story attracting interest in the press.

In 2011, the band produced the limited edition, 'pre-release' New Tricks EP featuring three new tracks, "Retribution", "This Heart Is Mine" and "High Stakes." They played another gig in Hull.

In July 2012, Ricky Squires, formerly of the dEAd End KIdS and the Heavy Metal Kids, joined on drums to play festivals and gigs with Salem in Europe, including the Heavy Metal Night V in Martinsicuro, Italy, Negosonic in Aalst and Ages of Metal IV in Oostrozebeke, Belgium, and the Metieval Winterfest back in Hull.

The band, as with Mendham again, continued to record further music and released their limited edition X Rated EP for the BROFEST#1 in Newcastle on 2 March 2013, including a bonus new recording of "Reach To Eternity". Further gigs in 2013 included shows in Netherlands, Germany, and back home in the UK at The Fleece in Bristol with Jaguar and at Fruit in Hull.

In July 2015, a new re-mastered version of the In the Beginning ... album was released by High Roller Records. The songs were re-arranged into the original chronological order.

==== Forgotten Dreams (2013) ====
Salem signed with Pure Steel Records again to release a new album, Forgotten Dreams, on 6 December 2013. The album, recorded at Hairy Monster Studios, has received critical acclaim as an "expertly crafted" "masterpiece".

In 2014, the band shot a short film at Fort Paull and in the crypt of Holy Trinity in Hull for "Forgotten Dreams", and the following year, the band filmed a second video of the song "The Answer" at sites in Barton-upon-Humber and Beverley.

Salem also played numerous festivals and gigs in UK, Europe and beyond, including Play It Loud in Italy, Very 'Eavy Festival in Netherlands, Headbangers Open Air in Germany, and Rock You To Hell in Greece. The final 2014 gig was in Dubai, United Arab Emirates with deputy drummer, Oli Davis.

Salem played gigs in Belgium and England in 2015, and at festivals including Wildfire, Scotland, BÄÄÄM in Germany, Power & Glory II and headlining RockWich in UK. In October, Salem was invited to play at British Steel festival in Fismes, France in place of Oliver/Dawson Saxon who had to cancel.

The band also contributed the track "Forgotten Dreams" to the RockWich 2015 commemorative CD, with all the other bands from the festival; all profits from the sale of the CD go to the Sophie Lancaster Foundation.

==== Dark Days (2016) ====
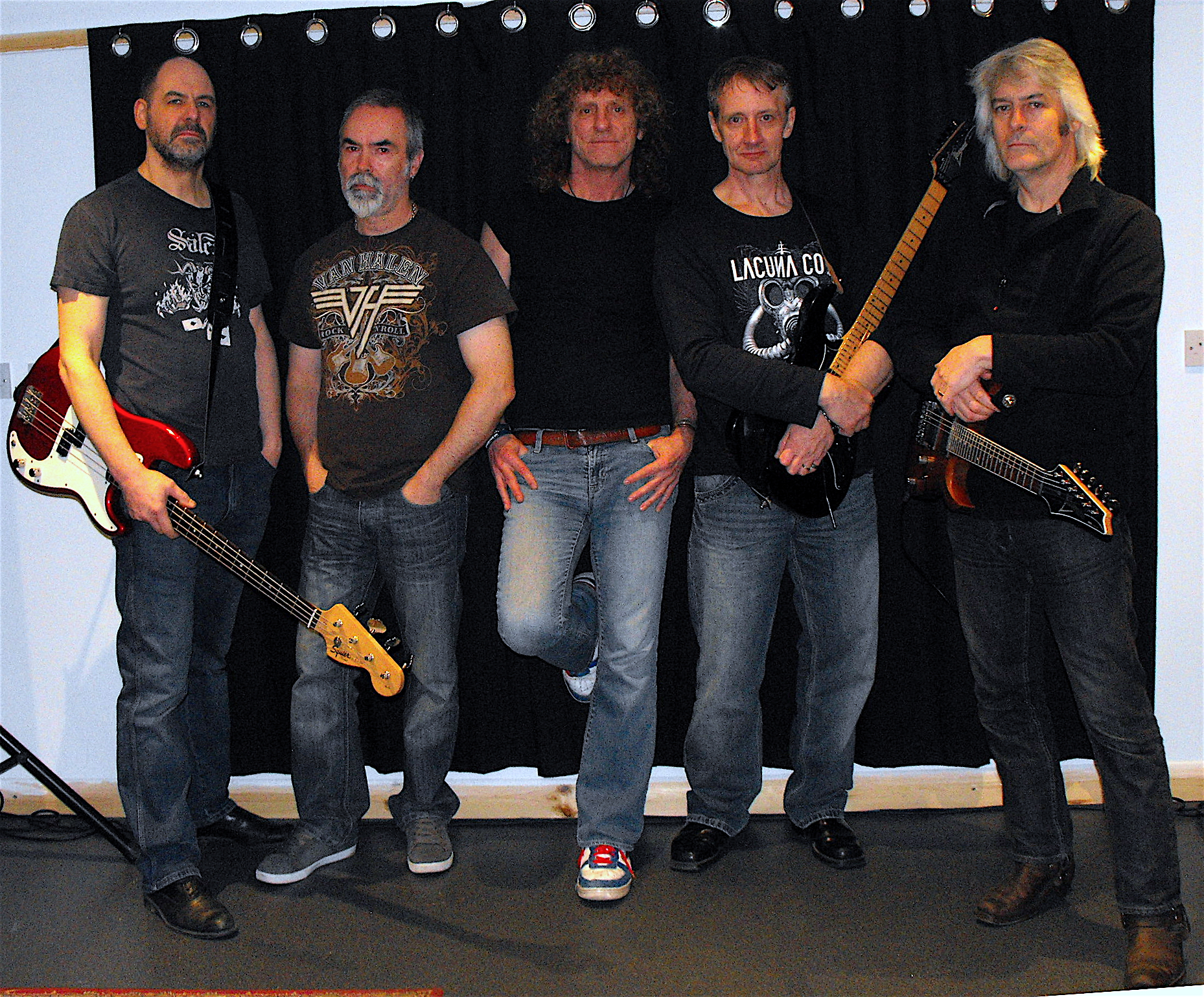
Salem in 2016

The band recorded the new album Dark Days at Hairy Monster Studios again. Macnamara revealed in an interview with PlanetMosh that Salem had worked on a collaboration with Manny Charlton for the new album. Dark Days was released on 29 April 2016, was described as "simply flawless from start to finish" and was considered one of the top albums of the year.

Salem played a series of gigs and festivals in 2016 including Muskelrock in Sweden (with Davis on drums again), a return to Headbangers Open Air, at Heavy Metal Maniacs in Netherlands, and gigs in Belgium and in UK with Tygers of Pan Tang, Diamond Head, Witchfynde and Spartan Warrior.

Events in 2017 included gigs in Barcelona, Spain, Belgium, France, and the UK, including the Grimm Up North fund raiser in Bury for Steve Grimmett of Grim Reaper.

==== Attrition (2018) ====
Salem has completed their third studio album at Hairy Monster Studios in Hull, UK. Developing from the up-beat theme of Forgotten Dreams and the more reflective mood of Dark Days, Macnamara described the third studio as a little "edgier", with the same heavy and melodic approach.

Attrition was released by Dissonance Productions (part of Plastic Head Distribution) on 23 February 2018. A release on vinyl is due in May. A promotional video of the song "Taking Control" is receiving much interest and the first reviews suggest that Attrition is a potential album of the year.

On 23 February 2018, the date that Attrition was released, Saxby and Jenkinson each received letters, illegally sacking them from the partnership. Litigation followed, and as a result, all rights to the albums Forgotten Dreams, Dark Days and Attrition were legally signed over to Saxby and Jenkinson, as well as exclusive rights to the name "Salem UK". Macnamara, Mendham and Allison were granted the right to operate under the name "From Salem".

In April 2018 Francis Gill (guitar) and Dave Megginson (drums) joined Saxby and Jenkinson to complete the new lineup of Salem UK. the band is currently recording a new album, to be released by Dissonance Productions.

== Acclaim ==
The band has been cited, along with Iron Maiden, Saxon and Tygers of Pan Tang, as one of the "top 10 NWOBHM bands that are better than ever!" With the growing interest in the band, it has been suggested that their "... Time Has Finally Come!"

Macnamara is a Blackstar endorsed artist.

== Discography ==
- "Cold as Steel" / "Reach to Eternity" (1982) Hilton Records
- "Reach to Eternity" appears on the NWOBHM Vol. 6 (1992) bootleg CD
- "Reach to Eternity" is also on the NWOBHM – Vinyl Revenge (2005) bootleg
- In the Beginning ... (double album) (2010), High Roller Records (vinyl), Pure Steel Records (CD)
- New Tricks (2011) EP – The New Adelphi Edition
- New Tricks (2012) EP – Europe 2012 Mix
- X Rated (2013) EP – Limited Edition BROFEST 2013
- Forgotten Dreams (2013) Pure Rock Records (vinyl and CD)
- In the Beginning ... version 2, (2015), High Roller Records CD
- "Forgotten Dreams" appears on the RockWich 2015 commemorative CD
- Dark Days (2016) Pure Steel Records (vinyl and CD)
- "Reach to Eternity" appears on the A Perfect Combination: Fairview Studios 1973–1993 (2016) CD
- Attrition (2018) Dissonance Productions (vinyl and CD)

== See also ==
- List of new wave of British heavy metal bands
- List of heavy metal bands
- Bands and musicians from Hull
