= Dragonsfire =

German metal band

Dragonsfire is a German heavy/power metal band. Having released three full-length albums, the first two, Visions of Fire and Metal Service, came out on Pure Steel Records.

The band signed with Pure Steel Records in 2008. In 2015, the band lost its bassist and then-singer Torsten Thassilo Herbert, who died.

== Discography ==
- Burning for Metal (demo EP, 2005)
- Visions of Fire (2008)
- Metal Service (2010)
- Speed Demon (EP, 2013)
- Metal X (EP, 2014)
- Masters of the Underground (split DVD with Steelpreacher and Secutor, 2021)
- "Hungry Beast" (single, 2021)
- Rebirth of the Beast (2025)

== External link ==
- Discogs

=== Further reading ===
- Review of Visions of Fire by Metal Temple
- Review of Visions of Fire by Stormbringer.at (in German)
- Review of Visions of Fire by Darkscene.at (in German)
- Review of Visions of Fire by Dangerdog Music Reviews
- Review of Metal Service by Darkscene.at (in German)
- Review of Metal Service by Dangerdog Music Reviews
- Review of Metal Service by PowerofMetal.dk
- Review of Metal X by Dangerdog Music Reviews
- Review of Rebirth of the Beast by Darkscene.at (in German)
- Review of Rebirth of the Beast by Obliveon (in German)
- Review of Rebirth of the Beast by Hellfire-Magazin (in German)
- Review of Rebirth of the Beast by Metal Roos
- Review of Rebirth of the Beast by Metalfactory.ch (in German)
