= Science of Annihilation =

Studio album by Cage
- Released: May 22, 2009
- Genre: Heavy metal Power metal
- Label: Music Buy Mail; Pure Steel Records (LP)
- Producer: Dave Garcia, Sean Peck

Cage chronology
Hell Destroyer (2007)	Science of Annihilation (2009)	Supremacy of Steel (2011)

Professional ratings
Review scores
Source	Rating
Danger Dog	4/5 stars
Rock Reviews	9/10 stars
Power of Metal	(9.8/10)
Metal.de	9/10 stars
Metal Review	7.5/10 stars

Science of Annihilation is the fifth studio album by American heavy metal band Cage, released on May 22, 2009. This is the first Cage album to feature former Psychotic Waltz drummer Norm Leggio.

== Track listing ==
1. "The Power That Feeds" (Peck)
2. "Planet Crusher" (Garcia / Peck)
3. "Scarlet Witch" (Garcia / Peck)
4. "Spirit Of Vengeance" (Garcia / Peck / McGinnis)
5. "Black River Falls" (Garcia / Peck)
6. "Operation Overlord" (McGinnis / Peck)
7. "Power Of A God" (Garcia / Peck / McGinnis)
8. "Speed Kills" (Garcia / Peck)
9. "Stranger In Black" (Garcia / Peck)
10. "Die Glocke" (Garcia / Peck)
11. "Spectre Of War" (Garcia / Peck)
12. "Science Of Annihilation" (Garcia / Peck)
13. "At The Edge Of The Infinite" (Garcia / Peck)

== Personnel ==
- Sean Peck – vocals
- Dave Garcia – guitars
- Anthony Wayne McGinnis – guitars
- Mike Giordono – bass
- Norm Leggio – drums
