= Alltheniko =

Italian heavy metal band

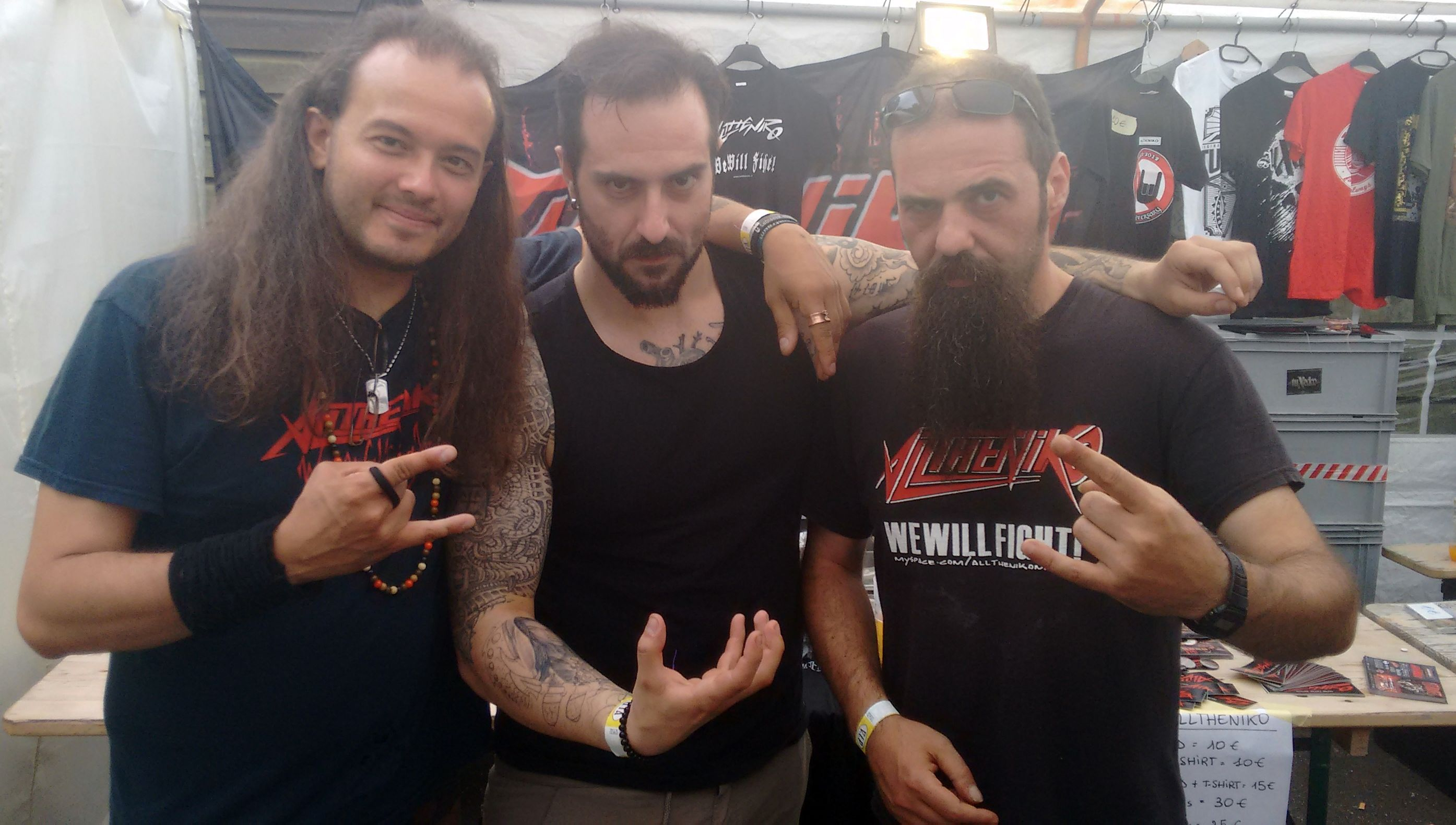
- Alltheniko at the Merchandise booth at Summernights Open Air 2018 (Germany)

Background information
- Origin: Vercelli, Italy
- Genres: Heavy metal, speed metal, thrash metal
- Years active: 2002–present
- Labels: My Graveyard, Pure Steel, Trinity Records Hong Kong
- Members: Dave Nightfight; Joe Boneshaker; Luke the Idol
- Website: sites.google.com/site/alltheniko

Alltheniko are an Italian heavy metal band formed in Vercelli in 2002 by Dave Nightfight (vocals and bass), Joe Boneshaker (guitar) and Luke the Idol (drums). The band's name comes from a pun involving the comune of Oldenico. The line-up never changed since the beginning.

== History ==
Alltheniko published three demos between 2002 and 2004. Thanks to these, in 2006 the group signed a record deal with My Graveyard Productions. The Italian label released the first three albums between 2006 and 2011. Furthermore, the debut album was released by Trinity Records Hong Kong for the Asian market.

In 2012, the group signed a new deal with German label Pure Steel Records. Pure Steel has been distributed via Soulfood since 2014. Due to this the fifth and sixth release are available worldwide.

Soon after releasing the debut, the band started playing festivals throughout southern and western Europe. Amongst others, they attended Metal Camp (Slovenia) in 2007, Play It Loud! Festival (Italy) in 2008, Vaques Fest (Spain) in 2012, Power of the Night-Festival (Cyprus) in 2015, and Hard'n Heavy Summernight Open Air (Germany) in 2018.

In May 2017, the band organized a two-day festival to celebrate their fifteenth year of activity. In addition to the Italian groups, there were also two groups from Germany.

== Musical style ==
The band plays speed metal and traditional heavy metal, with influences that go back to the 1980s. Also, the sound contains elements of thrash metal.

== Reception ==
In an announcement, La Stampa wrote: "One of Vercelli's historic bands, which triggered generations of rockers". In a review of „Italian History VI" Heavy Metal Webzine highlighted how balanced the group is: "alchemy, balance and an almost perfect communion of musical intentions". The Italian magazine metallized.it judged the group in 2017 "a real guarantee in the industry".

Especially with their sixth album Italian History VI they have received reviews throughout Europe. Print magazines include, amongst others, Rock Hard from Germany, Scream from Norway Powerplay Magazine from England, and World Of Metal Magazine from Portugal. Online reviews were published, amongst other countries, in Germany (Metal 1), France (Soil Chronicles), Greece (Metal Zone) and Switzerland (Metal Factory).

Earlier releases also received reviews throughout Europe like Fast and Glorious (i.e. German Rock Hard and Austrian Stormbringer) or Back in 2066 (Three Head Mutant Chronicles) (i.e. Danish Power of Metal).

== Members ==
=== Current line-up ===
- Dave Nightfight – vocals, bass (2002–present)
- Joe Boneshaker – guitars (2002–present)
- Luke the Idol – drums (2002–present)

== Discography ==
=== Albums ===
- 2006: We Will Fight! (My Graveyard Productions, Trinity Records Hong Kong)
- 2008: Devasterpiece (My Graveyard Productions)
- 2011: Millennium Re-Burn (My Graveyard Productions)
- 2012: Back in 2066 (Pure Steel Records)
- 2014: Fast and Glorious (Pure Steel Records)
- 2017: Italian History VI (Pure Steel Records)

=== Demo ===
- 2002: Animal Thing
- 2003: Sound of Rust
- 2004: Extermination
- 2010: Make a Party in Hell

=== Appearances on compilation albums ===
- 2007: Sound of Rust – Masterpiece vol.1 (Masterpiece Distribution)
- 2008: Thunder And Steel – Kill Em All (MDD Records)
- 2009: Feel the Power – Heavy Metal Killers (Earache Records)
- 2012: The Curse – All Fear the Axeman (My Graveyard Productions)
