= Bury the Light =

Studio album by Pharaoh
- Released: February 24, 2012
- Genre: Power metal
- Label: Cruz Del Sur

Bury the Light is the fourth studio album by American power metal band Pharaoh, released on February 24, 2012 in Europe, and on March 6 in the United States via Cruz Del Sur Music. It features guest solos by Mike Wead (King Diamond) and Jim Dofka.

== Track listing ==
| No. | Title | Length |
|---|---|---|
| 1. | "Leave Me Here to Dream" | 4:55 |
| 2. | "The Wolves" | 4:51 |
| 3. | "Castles in the Sky" | 5:02 |
| 4. | "The Year of the Blizzard" | 7:45 |
| 5. | "The Spider's Thread" | 4:04 |
| 6. | "Cry" | 4:22 |
| 7. | "Graveyard of Empires" | 6:42 |
| 8. | "Burn with Me" | 4:00 |
| 9. | "In Your Hands" | 5:07 |
| 10. | "The Spider's Thread (Reprise)" | 1:34 |
| Total length: | | 48:22 |

== Reception ==
Professional ratings
Review scores
| Source | Rating |
|---|---|
| Lords of Metal | (89/100) |

== Personnel ==
- Tim Aymar - vocals
- Chris Kerns - bass
- Matt Johnsen - electric guitar
- Chris Black - drums
