= Play It Loud! Festival =

- Genre: Heavy metal
- Dates: February
- Locations: Orzinuovi, Italy
- Years active: 2007 – present
- Founders: My Graveyard Productions
- Website: myspace.com/playitloudfest

Play It Loud! Festival was a heavy metal festival held annually in Orzinuovi, Italy since 2007. It is organized by the My Graveyard Productions independent record label. The festival has up-and-coming bands from Italy and Europe (which usually occupy the first few performing slots), re-united Italian metal acts from the 80s (which perform during late afternoon and early evening) and old-school international metal acts from the past (which usually close the day as headliners). The first edition featured NWOBHM (New Wave of British Heavy Metal) legends Blitzkrieg and Raven, while the second hosted the likes of Elixir, Cloven Hoof, Helstar and Manilla Road. The third edition of the festival took place in February 2009, and it will be co-headlined by Exciter and Jag Panzer.

== Lineups ==
=== 2009 ===
Held at Argelato near Bologna

- Exciter
- Jag Panzer
- Jaguar
- Vanexa
- Bud Tribe
- Lonewolf
- National Suicide
- Fallen Fuckin' Angels
- Wotan

=== 2008 ===
Held at Buddha Café in Orzinuovi, Italy on February 23.

- Manilla Road
- Helstar
- Cloven Hoof
- Steel Assassin
- Sabotage
- Elixir
- Adramelch
- Tarchon Fist
- Frozen Tears
- Alltheniko
- Berserker

=== 2007 ===
Held at Buddha Café in Orzinuovi, Italy on February 17.

- Raven
- Blitzkrieg
- Skanners
- Paragon
- Crying Steel
- Dark Quarterer
- Ironsword
- Battleroar
- Assedium
- Battle Ram
- Powerful
