= Cage (band) =

American heavy metal band

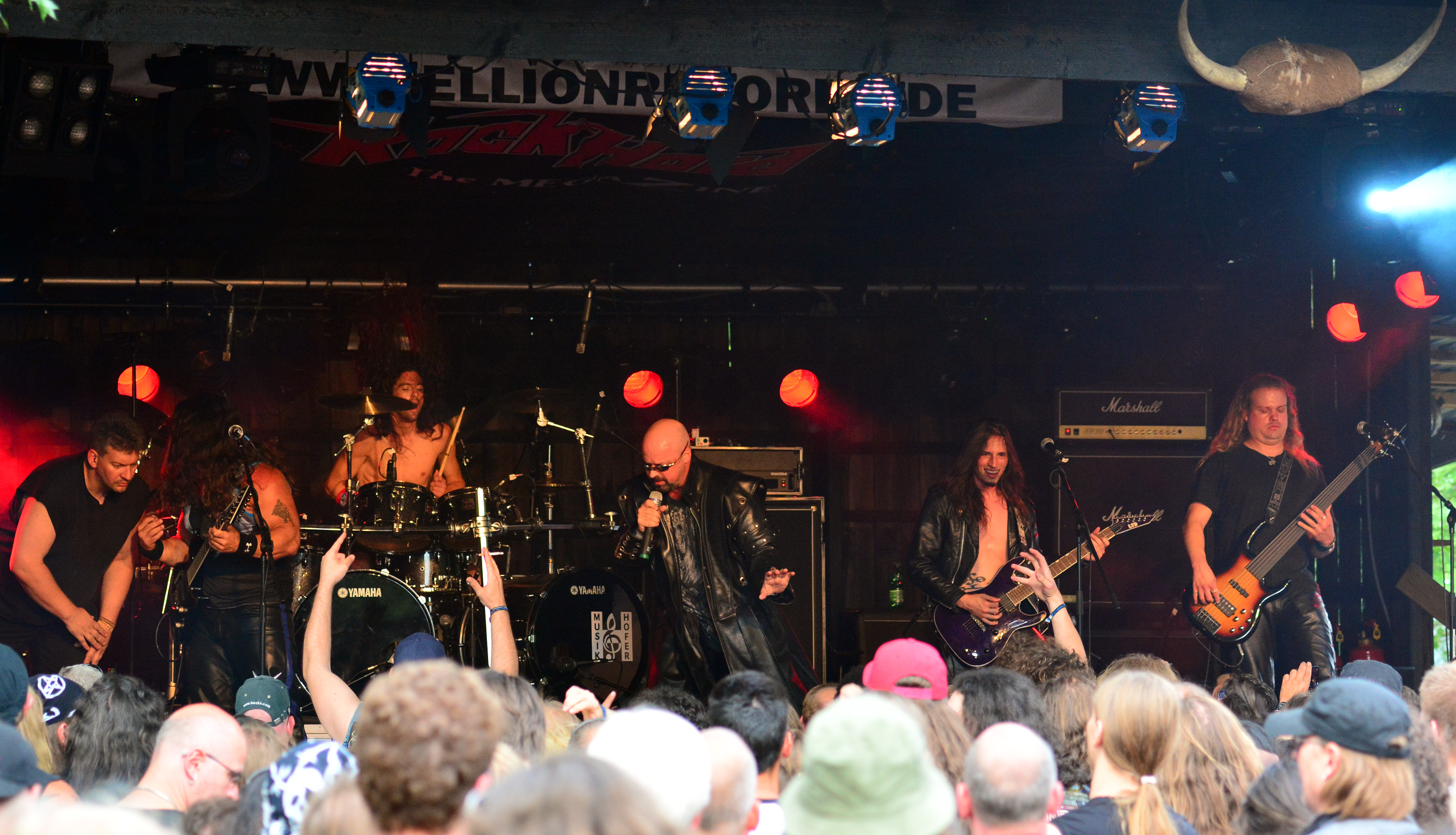
- Cage at Headbangers Open Air 2014

Background information
- Origin: San Diego, California, U.S.
- Genres: Heavy metal; power metal
- Years active: 1992–present
- Labels: Heavy Metal Media; Omega; Massacre; MTM; Pure Steel; Sweden Music Group; Destroy All
- Members: Sean Peck; Dave Garcia; Casey Trask; Rafael Gamma Jr. Sean Elg
- Past members: Anthony McGinnis; Eric Horton; Garret Peters; Steve Brogden; Mike Giordano; Pete Stone; Dwight Magic; Damian Arletto; Mike Nielsen; Norm Leggio; Alex Pickard

Cage is an American heavy metal band from San Diego, California. Over their career, the band has released seven studio albums and played shows with Great White, Manowar, Metallica, and Judas Priest.

== Biography ==
Cage formed in 1992 with the original lineup being, Sean Peck (vocals), David Garcia (guitar), Eric Horton (guitar), Mike Giordano (bass), and Damian Arletto (drums). Peck had previously been the leader of a band called Nomad, while Garcia and Giordano had performed with Crusher. Garcia and Horton had also been a part of Nomad with Peck. Even though the band formed in 1992, the band did not release their first album, Unveiled, until 1998, likely due to it being self-produced. By 1999, Arletto had exited the band and was replaced by Mike Nielsen.

The band became known around the time of their second album, Astrology, released in 2001, via Molten Metal. The album was Nielsen's debut with the band. Shortly after this period of time, Cage signed to Massacre Records, then home to artists such as King Diamond, Virgin Black, and Mystic Circle. Following their signing, the band released their third album, Darker Than Black, which came out in 2003. By this time, Anthony McGinnis had joined as the band's new guitarist, replacing Horton.

In 2007, the band released their fourth full-length album, Hell Destroyer, which came out through MTM Music, featuring artists such as Stryper. Hell Destroyer became the band's most commercial album to date following its release, receiving several positive reviews from many different sites. Mark Gromen of Brave Words praised the album saying "Easily my favourite Cage disc since Unveiled!" Scott Alisoglu of Blabbermouth.net stated "Heavy metal concept albums are hit or miss propositions.....There are very few albums that can claim to be as quintessentially heavy metal as Hell Destroyer. In August 2007, Nielsen departed from the band, being replaced by former Psychotic Waltz drummer Norm Leggio.

With this lineup, the band set out to write and record their fifth album, Science of Annihilation, which was released through Pure Steel Records. Pure Steel was home to Mortician and Warrant at the time. In early 2010, original bassist Mike Giordano and lead guitarist Anthony Wayne McGinnis exited the band. Giordano stated that he departed due to "medical issues", whereas McGinnis stepped down due to "family issues". Later that year, the band recruited members; bassist Steve Brogden (guitarist/vocalist for the power/thrash metal band Howler) and former Brick Bath bassist Pete Stone.

The band released their sixth full-length album, Supremacy of Steel, in 2011, with the lineup of Peck, Garcia, Brogden, Stone, and Leggio. The artwork for the album was designed by Marvel Comics illustrator Marc Sasso. However, Brogden departed before the album was released, being replaced by Climhazzard member Garret Peters. However, by 2013, the band essentially dissolved, with Stone, Peters, and Leggio departing from the band. In 18-months time, Garcia wrote a solo album titled Hellscream, working alongside former Imagika vocalist Norman Skinner.

Upon reconvening the band in 2013, Peck and Garcia were tasked with creating a new lineup. The two hired on Guitarist Casey Trask of Monarch, Nihilist drummer Sean Elg, and Dwight "Magic" Moy of Detonated on bass. With the new band in place, the five entered the studio to record their seventh studio album, Ancient Evil, a 19-track concept album. Shortly after the recording of the album, however, Moy quit the band and was replaced by Alex Pickard of the Vista, California-based band Monarch.

As of 2018, the band currently double as The Three Tremors, a collaborative effort of all current members of Cage, Jag Panzer vocalist Harry "The Tyrant" Conklin, and former Iced Earth and Judas Priest vocalist Tim "Ripper" Owens. The Three Tremors have put out three studio albums, The Three Tremors, The Solo Versions, and Guardians of the Void.

== Band members ==
Current members

- Sean "The Hell Destroyer" Peck – vocals (1992–present)
- Dave "Conan" Garcia – guitars (1992–present)
- Casey "The Sentinel" Trask – guitars (2013–present)
- Rafael Gamma Jr. – bass (2021–present)
- Sean Elg – drums (2013–present)

Former members

- Anthony Wayne McGinnis – guitars (2002–2010)
- Eric Horton – guitars (1992–2002)
- Garret Peters – guitars (2012–2013)
- Steve "MetalBrog" Brogden – guitars (2010–2012)
- Mike Giordano – bass (1992–2010)
- Pete "Hands of" Stone – bass (2010–2013)
- Dwight "Magic" Moy – bass (2013–2015)
- Damian Arletto – drums (1992–1999)
- Mike Nielsen – drums (1999–2008)
- Norm "The Legend" Leggio – drums (2008–2013)
- Alex "Captain" Pickard - Bass (2015-2021)

Timeline

== Discography ==
Studio albums

- Unveiled (1998)
- Astrology (2000)
- Darker Than Black (2003)
- Hell Destroyer (2007)
- Science of Annihilation (2009)
- Supremacy of Steel (2011)
- Ancient Evil (2015)
- Science Of Annihilation: Re-Annihilated (2019)

EPs

- Crusher Tape (2007)

Live albums

- Live In Kalamazoo (2007)

Video albums

- The Rise to Power (2011)

Singles

- "Cage Tape" (2007)
- "Planet Crusher" (2009)

Compilations

- Hidden Sessions (2007)
- Lost CD (2007)
