= Angband (band) =

Persian power metal/progressive musical group

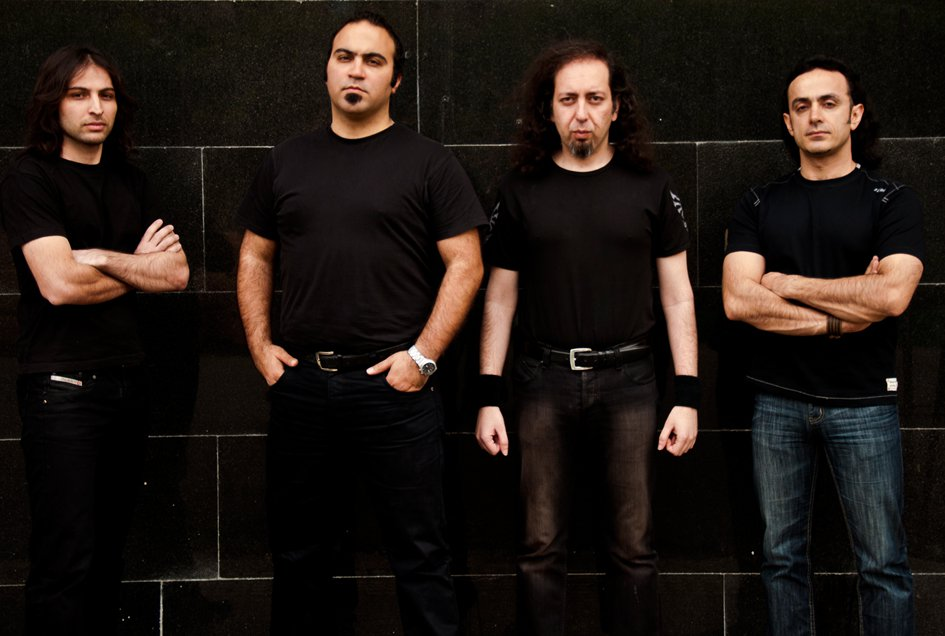

Background information
- Origin: Tehran, Iran
- Genres: Power metal, progressive metal
- Years active: 2004−present
- Label: Pure Steel
- Members: Mahyar Dean; Ramin Rahimi
- Past members: M. Halaji; Farshad Shokuhfar; Ashkan Yazdani; Tim Aymar
- Website: Official website

Angband is a Persian-American power metal group, formed in 2004 in Tehran.

== Band history ==
Angband was formed in 2004 in Tehran by Mahyar Dean, a classically trained musician and author who is known for writing books about the bands Death and Testament. Angband was originally conceived as a progressive metal/instrumental project, but with the inclusion of singer Ashkan Yazdani they headed in a more power metal/progressive metal vein. The band's name is a reference to the fortress of the Dark Lord Morgoth in J. R. R. Tolkien's The Silmarillion.

Once Ramin Rahimi joined the band as drummer, the band was able to record their first full-length album, which was titled Rising from Apadana. Mahyar Dean played the bass parts as well as the guitars but shortly after the album was released, M. Halaji joined the band as a full-time bassist.

After the release of the first album, Ramin Rahimi, who is an experienced percussion player, signed a deal with ARC Music for a solo project. His solo music mostly focuses on Iranian percussion and drums. Angband uses Daf, a Persian percussion instrument, in their music exclusively.

In April 2011 M. Halaji left the band and was replaced by Farshad Shokuhfar, a bass player that Mahyar Dean saw at a concert a few months before.

== Music history ==
Angband entered the studio in July 2007 to record their debut album Rising from Apadana. Shortly thereafter, they signed a record deal with Pure Steel Records of Germany. They are the first heavy metal band from Iran to sign with an international record company.

Rising from Apadana was released on August 29, 2008, to some positive reviews.

=== 2009–2010 ===
In June 2009 they announced that the title of their second album would be Visions of the Seeker. It was originally due to be released by the fourth quarter of that year but the release was held back to 2010 because of a production problem. In May 2010 Germany's Metal Hammer posted a full site interview/article about the band.

The band collaborated with the well-known producer/sound engineer Achim Kohler (Primal Fear, Brainstorm) and the mixing and mastering process was finished in August 2010. The album was delayed for about a year but finally released on October 29, 2010. Angband's first official video, "Forsaken Dreams", was released in November 2010.

=== 2011–12 ===
In April 2011, the band announced that they were working on a new album with their new bassist Farshad Shokuhfar. When they finished recording the album, titled Saved from the Truth, as was the case with previous album, the mixing and mastering was handled by Achim Kohler. The album released on September 28, 2012 and was met with acclaim by the international press. "The prog influences have gained much more room on this album... On 'Saved From The Truth’ the gentlemen show progress on all fronts.", Lords Of Metal magazine describes the album.

=== 2017–2020 ===
Earlier in the year, the band announced the departure of vocalist Ashakn Yazdani and bassist Farshad Shokuhfar. In October, Tim Aymar (Control Denied, Pharaoh) joined the band as the new singer to release a new album in 2018. The album which is called IV took 3 years to complete, mostly because the singer had chronic neck pain. Finally, it was released on July 24, 2020.

== Musical style ==
Angband is often described as power metal with elements of progressive metal and Persian folk music.

== Discography ==
=== Studio albums ===
- Rising from Apadana (2008)
- Visions of the Seeker (2010)
- Saved from the Truth (2012)
- IV (2020)

=== Singles ===
- "Visions in My Head" (2020)

=== Videos ===
- Forsaken Dreams (2010)

== Members ==
=== Current members ===
- Mahyar Dean - Guitars (2004–present), Bass (2017-present)
- Ramin Rahimi - Drums and percussions (2007–present)

=== Former Members ===
- Ashkan Yazdani - Vocals (200?-2017)
- Mohammad Hallaji - Bass (2009-2011)
- Farshad Shokuhfar - Bass (2011-2017)
- Tim Aymar = Vocals (2017-2023)
