= Pharaoh (band) =

American power metal band

- Origin: Philadelphia, Pennsylvania, U.S.
- Genres: Power metal, progressive metal
- Years active: 1997–2023
- Labels: Cruz Del Sur
- Past members: Tim Aymar; Chris Kerns; Matt Johnsen; Chris Black
- Website: solarflight.net

Pharaoh was an American power metal band.

== Band history ==
The band was formed in 1997 in Pennsylvania by four American musicians but the musical roots of Pharaoh come from European power metal acts. Featuring Tim Aymar, who is best known for his vocals on Control Denied, Chris Kerns on bass, Matt Johnsen on guitar and Chris Black on drums, they released their debut After the Fire in 2003. The band is known for multi-layered instrumentation and well produced albums.

Pharaoh has collaborated with many notable musicians including guitarist Chris Poland (OHM, ex-Megadeth) on The Longest Night album and King Diamond guitarist Mike Wead on the Bury The Light album.

== Discography ==
Title	Release date	Type	Label
After the Fire	2003	Studio album	Cruz Del Sur
The Longest Night	2006	Studio album	Cruz Del Sur
Be Gone	2008	Studio album	Cruz Del Sur
Tribute to Coroner	2010	Split	Cruz Del Sur
Ten Years	2011	EP	Cruz Del Sur
Bury the Light	2012	Studio album	Cruz Del Sur
The Powers That Be	2021	Studio album	Cruz Del Sur
