= Georges Momboye =

Georges Momboye (born 20th century in Kouibly) is an Ivorian dancer and choreographer working in Paris. He is considered one of the most representative artists in modern African dance.

Momboye's style draws from those of Alvin Ailey, Brigitte Matenzi, Rick Odums and Gisèle Houri among others, and it is characterized by a fusion of African traditional dance and European ballet. He has choreographed several international, award-winning dance shows, both with his own troupe (the Georges Momboye Dance Company, founded in 1992) and with other artists. Some of his most successful works are an adaptation of Igor Stravinsky's The Rite of Spring and the circus-inspired live show Afrika! Afrika!
