= Permanent Presidential Music Commission =

The Permanent Presidential Music Commission (PPMC) of Kenya was a government Commission

The Commission was established in 1988 to promote the development and practice of music and dance; the development of the Kenyan music industry and to preserve Kenyan musical arts and expression.

In 2008, the Ministry of State for Public Service transformed the Commission into the Department of Music under the Ministry of State for National Heritage and Culture
