= Astrology (album) =

Studio album by Cage
- Released: September 4, 2000
- Genre: Heavy metal
- Length: 72:13
- Label: Omega Records
- Producer: CAGE

Cage chronology
Unveiled (1998)	Astrology (2000)	Darker Than Black (2003)

Astrology is the second album by American heavy metal band CAGE. It was released on September 4, 2000, by Omega Records and has a running time of 72 minutes.

== Reception ==
In his review of the album for Allmusic, Eduardo Rivadavia considered Astrology to be: " ... as over the top and pretentious as power metal gets – in a good way. ... the disc features 12 songs (plus nifty intro) dedicated to the 12 signs of the zodiac, and resulting in a semi-concept album sure to entertain committed power metal enthusiasts. Stand-out tracks like "Psychotically Deranged," "Souls and Flesh," and "The Astrologicon" offer stellar musicianship, lightning fast staccato riffing, generous use of melodies, and, of course, soaring, ear-piercing vocals from the barrel-chested Sean Peck."

== Track listing ==
1. "Astrology"
2. "Final Solution"
3. "Psychotically Deranged"
4. "The Edge"
5. "Echelon"
6. "Root of All Evil"
7. "The Trigger Effect"
8. "Souls and Flesh"
9. "Fountain of Youth"
10. "Broken Dreams"
11. "Vandalize"
12. "Victim of Society"
13. "The Astrologicon"

== Personnel ==
- Sean Peck – vocals
- Dave Garcia – guitars
- Eric Holton – guitars
- Mike Giordono – bass
- Mike Nielsen – drums
