= Ramin Rahimi =

Ramin Rahimi رامین رحیمی
- Born: Tehran, Iran
- Occupations: Professional Musician, Composer
- Instruments: Drums, Daf, Tombak; Conga, Djembe, Cajon
- Years active: 1990–present
- Labels: ARC Music; Pure Steel Records
- Member of: Angband

Ramin Rahimi (Persian: رامین رحیمی) is a percussionist and songwriter. His music mostly focused on drums and Iranian Percussions Daf and Tombak. he is also one of the members of power metal act Angband.

== Biography ==
Born 1969 in Tehran, Rahimi worked with Tehran Symphony Orchestra for some years as a Cello player.

He founded an all percussion band named Ramin Rahimi's Tapesh in 1998, a 25-member big band in concerts.

He joined Angband in 2007, a power metal/progressive band that signed with Pure Steel Records from Germany later that year, released an album in August 2008 entitled “Rising from Apadana”.

In 2007 he also Recorded his first solo Album, then in 2008 signed with ARC Music and in July 2009 his first solo album “Iraninan Percussion” released and received well.

In 2008-9 Ramin worked on Angband’s second album Visions of the Seeker and then focused to write materials for his new solo album The Pulse of Persia, the album was released in June 2010 through ARC Music, a more colorful release due to many guest musicians on Persian folk instruments.

Ramin Rahimi played many concerts in his own country. Besides that many world music listeners have seen him on stage in many countries, including Turkey, Germany, Finland, France, Czech Republic, Armenia, Turkmenistan and Tajikistan.

Ramin Rahimi's music featured on BBC Radio 3.

== Discography ==
=== Solo albums ===
- Iranian Percussion (2009) ARC Music
- The Pulse of Persia (2010) ARC Music
- Persian Percussion Electrified (2012) ARC Music

=== With Angband ===
- Rising from Apadana (2008) Pure Steel Records
- Visions of the Seeker (2010) Pure Steel Records
- Saved from the Truth (2012) Pure Steel Records

=== Compilation ===
- Masters of Percussion Vol.3 (2009) ARC Music
