= ARC Music =

British record label specializing in world music

- Parent company: Naxos
- Founded: 1976
- Genre: World music, folk music
- Country of origin: England
- Location: West Sussex
- Official website: www.arcmusic.co.uk

ARC Music is a world music and folk music label based in West Sussex, England, that was established in 1976. Naxos acquired ARC in 2019.

== Film and television ==
ARC Music has been used in the films Indiana Jones and the Kingdom of the Crystal Skull, Casino Royale, Burn After Reading, The Kingdom, The Constant Gardener, and Skyfall.

== Notable artists ==
- Ana Alcaide
- Mark Atkins
- Clannad
- David Fanshawe
- Golden Bough
- Seckou Keita
- Bilja Krstić & Bistrik Orchestra
- Pete Lockett
- Charlie McMahon
- Ramin Rahimi
- Hossam Ramzy
- Baluji Shrivastav
- Yale Strom
- Cheng Yu
- Otava Yo
- Anuang'a Fernando
- Kálmán Balogh
