= Pure Steel Records =

German record label

- Founded: 2006
- Founder: Kay Anders; Andreas Lorenz
- Distributor: Indie
- Genre: Heavy metal Power metal Thrash metal Progressive metal Glam metal
- Country of origin: Germany
- Location: Schwarzenberg
- Official website: puresteel-records.com

Pure Steel Records is a record label based in Germany that focuses on heavy metal music. Pure Steel produces CDs and LPs.

Founded by Kay Anders and Andreas Lorenz in 2006, the main interest of Pure Steel is to spread the true and independent heavy metal sound inspired by the glorious 80s. After 2007, when thrash metal and power metal was growing again they introduced many bands to the metal world. They also collaborate with other labels to re-release notable metal albums on LP. Pure Steel released the first official tribute to Warlock / Doro Pesch in December 2008.

== Bands ==
- CD bands:

As Darkness Dies, Agamendon, Alltheniko, Angband, Artizan, Arctic Flame, A Tortured Soul, Attick Demons, Blazing Rust, Boomerang, Cage, Conjuring Fate, Chimaera, Commandment, Crom, Crystal Tears, Custard, Deathfist, Desert Sin, Destructor, Dragonsfire, Emerald, Enchanter, Eternal Reign, Exxplorer, Eynomia, Fatal Embrace, Gorgons Eyes, Helvetest Port, Halloween, Hjallarhorn, Holy Cross, Icy Steel, Ice Vinland, In Aevum Agere, In Solitude, Ivory Tower, Jackal, Lanfear, Mortician, Overdrive U.K. Pandea, Phantom-X, Power Theory (US band), Primeval Realm, Project Terror, Razorfist, Salem, Savage Blade, Sencirow, Shadowkeep, Skullview, Split Heaven, Steel Raiser, St. Elmo's Fire, Stormrider, The Prowlers, Thunderblast, Titan Steele, Trauma, Ursus, Valkyrie's Cry, Warcry, Warrant, Widow, Wolfs Moon, Wretch (US), Zandelle, Sacrilege, Lost Legacy (US band)

- LP bands:

Aska, Avenger, Cage, Crescent Shield, Emerald, Fatal Embrace, Pharaoh, Sacred Steel, Salem, Seasons of the Wolf, Shadowkeep, Steel Prophet, Trauma

== Distribution ==
Distribution is handled through Soulfood GmbH in Europe.

== See also ==
- List of record labels
- GEMA (Germany)
