= Leash law =

Leash law may refer to:

- Leash Law, an American power metal band
- Leash law, a law requiring dogs or other pets to be kept on a leash while in public
