= Emily Doolittle =

Canadian composer (b.1972)

Emily Lenore Doolittle (born 16 October 1972) is a Canadian composer, zoomusicologist, and Athenaeum Research Fellow and Lecturer in Composition at the Royal Conservatoire of Scotland based in Glasgow, Scotland.

Her music, frequently inspired by folklore and the natural world has been commissioned and performed around the world. She is a member of the Scottish Music Centre and the Canadian Music Centre.

== Life and work ==
Emily grew up in Halifax, Nova Scotia. She studied at Dalhousie University (with Dennis Farrell and Steve Tittle), the Koninklijk Conservatorium in the Hague, (where she studied with Louis Andriessen with the support of a Fulbright Fellowship), Indiana University Bloomington (where she studied with Don Freund) and Princeton University (where she studied with Steve Mackey, Barbara White, Paul Lansky, Paul Koonce, and Peter Westergaard). From 2008 to 2015 she was an associate professor of music at the Cornish College of the Arts in Seattle.

Emily has an interest in zoomusicology (the study of animal and human song) and the natural world. She has explored this in a number of works, her doctoral dissertation at Princeton and as a part of interdisciplinary birdsong research conducted alongside biologists and ornithologists. Together with cognitive biologist W. Tecumseh Fitch, Bruno Gingras and Dominik Endres, she discovered that hermit thrush song follows the overtone series.

Of the development of her passion for bird and animal song, she has said: "I was studying at the Koninklijk Conservatorium in the Hague when a bird woke me up one morning. It sounded like human music and aroused my interest in animal song." Other predominant themes in her music include story-telling, music with and/or for children and folklore. Her chamber opera Jan Tait and the Bear was awarded a 2016 Opera America Discovery Grant and was selected for performance at the Edinburgh Festival Fringe as part of the 2018 Made in Scotland Showcase.

Her work has received numerous awards, including the 2012 Theodore Front Prize for A Short, Slow Life, two ASCAP Morton Gold Awards, the Joseph H. Bearns Prize, and the Sorel Organization Medallion in Recording. She has been commissioned by such ensembles as the Vancouver Symphony Orchestra, Symphony Nova Scotia, Orchestre Métropolitain, the Albany Symphony Orchestra, the New York Youth Symphony, and Ensemble Contemporain de Montréal

== List of works ==
=== Chamber music ===
- 7 Duos for Bird or Strings (violin and viola)
- col (violin and marimba)
- Falling still (string quartet)
- Field Guide (string trio)
- Folie à Deux (flute and harpsichord)
- Four pieces about water (flute/piccolo, clarinet, bassoon, horn, trombone, piano, violin, cello and double bass)
- migrations
- night black bird song (two piccolos, three percussion)
- Palouse Songbook (flute and piano)
- REEDS (oboe, B♭ clarinet, bassoon and dancer)
- Sorex (a celebration of untamed shrews) (piano duet)
- Suppose I was a marigold (cello and piano)
- While the parrot repeats human words (narrator, clarinet, viola and percussion)
- The Wise Daughter (narrator, violin and piano)
- Woodwings (wind quintet)
- Three Summer Pieces (flute duo)

=== Choral ===
- Dàn nan Ròn (children's choir with flute and cello obligato)
- Seal songs (narrator, children's choir and chamber ensemble)
- Songs of Seals

=== Orchestral ===
- Reedbird (for winds and brass)
- A Short, Slow Life (for soprano and orchestra)
- ...and some fireworks
- green/blue
- Green notes
- Sapling

=== Opera ===
- Jan Tait and the Bear (chamber opera)

=== Solo ===
- Aubade (solo flute)
- Field Music (solo clarinet)
- Gliese 581 c (solo piano)
- Minute etudes (solo piano)
- Minute etudes (book two) (solo piano)
- Music for Magpies (viola da gamba)

=== Vocal ===
- Airs of men long dead (mezzo soprano and piano)
- All spring (soprano, flute, clarinet, violin, bass and percussion)
- Body of Wood (soprano, Bohlen-Pierce clarinet, cello and percussion)
- Child's play (soprano and piano)
- Hammarskjold songs (soprano and piano)
- Ruby-Throated Moment (solo high soprano)
- A short, slow life (soprano and orchestra - version with soprano and 10 instruments also available)
- Social sounds from whales at night (soprano and tape)
- Virelais (soprano and solo bowed instrument)

=== Recordings ===
all spring - CD of chamber music performed by the Seattle Chamber Players and friends - comcon0025 7/15
