= Caninus (band) =

American deathgrind band

- Origin: New York City, United States
- Genres: Deathgrind, grindcore
- Years active: 1992–2011
- Label: War Torn
- Past members: Basil; Budgie; Buddy Bronson; Justin Brannan; Rachel Rosen; Richard Christy; Blast Thundercurry (Colin Kercz); Rocky Raccoon; Thunder Hammer Attack; L. Ron Howard

Caninus was an American deathgrind band formed as a side project by Most Precious Blood guitarist Justin Brannan, Rachel Rosen, drummer Colin Thundercurry and two pitbull terrier bitches, Budgie and Basil, on vocals. They were signed to War Torn Records and had three releases, including a split with Hatebeak and a 7" split with death metal band Cattle Decapitation. In 2008, Richard Christy played the drums on an unknown number of songs for Caninus.

On January 5, 2011, Basil, one of Caninus's pitbulls, died. Basil had been diagnosed with a brain tumor and was euthanized. The band has ended because of the dog's death. Vocalist Budgie also died in early 2016.

== Past members ==
- Basil – vocals
- Budgie – vocals
- Buddy Bronson – bass
- Justin Brannan – guitar
- Rachel Rosen – guitar
- Richard Christy – drums
- Blast Thundercurry (Colin Kercz) – drums
- Rocky Raccoon – drums
- Thunder Hammer Attack – drums
- L. Ron Howard – drums

== Discography ==
- Now the Animals Have a Voice, album (2004)
- Caninus/Hatebeak, split (2005)
- Cattle Decapitation/Caninus, split (2005)

== See also ==
- Hatebeak
- Zoomusicology
