= Hollis Taylor =

American-born Australian academic and musician

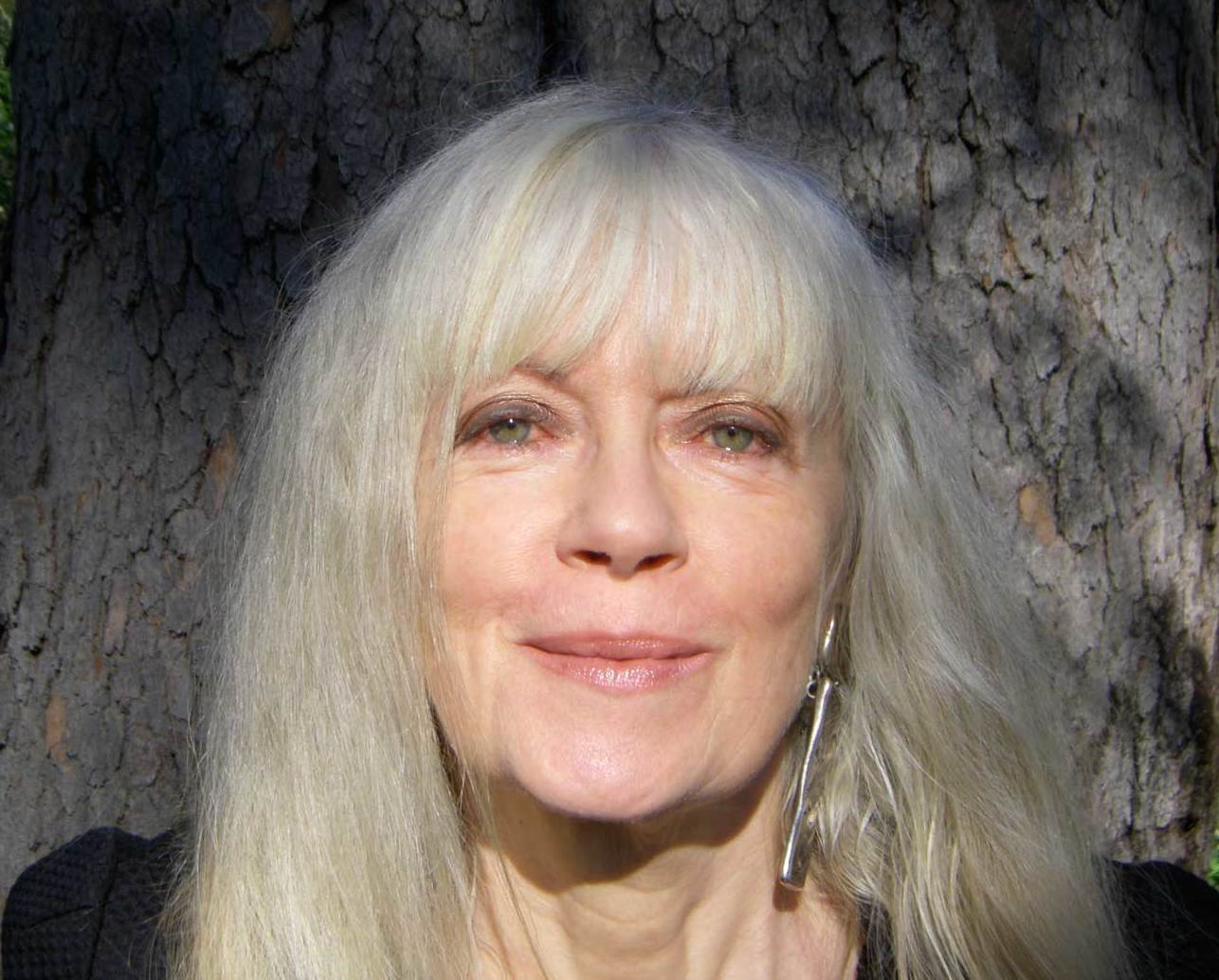
- Born: United States
- Education: Washington University in St. Louis, University of Western Sydney
- Occupations: Zoomusicologist, musician, composer
- Employer: Macquarie University
- Known for: Arguing that birdsong is music
- Notable work: Absolute Bird, Is Birdsong Music?
- Partner: Jon Rose
- Honours: Richard Gill Award for Distinguished Services to Australian Music

Hollis Taylor is an American-born Australian zoomusicologist and composer and a violinist and fiddler. She has argued that birdsong should be approached as music. In 2025 Taylor and her partner, Jon Rose, were recipients of the Richard Gill Award for Distinguished Services to Australian Music.

== Early life and education ==
Taylor was born in the United States. She graduated from West Linn High School in West Linn, Oregon. She graduated from Webster University in St. Louis with a bachelor's degree in violin performance. In 2009 she received a PhD from the University of Western Sydney School of Communication Arts with a concentration in musicology, ornithology, and composition.

== Work ==
=== Composition and performance ===
Taylor played with the Oregon Symphony while still a teenager. She was the 1982 Oregon Old Time Fiddle Champion. During the 1980s and 1990s she headed the Hollis Taylor Band, an acoustic country trio, and was a member of other groups. She became concertmaster at Wolf Trap.

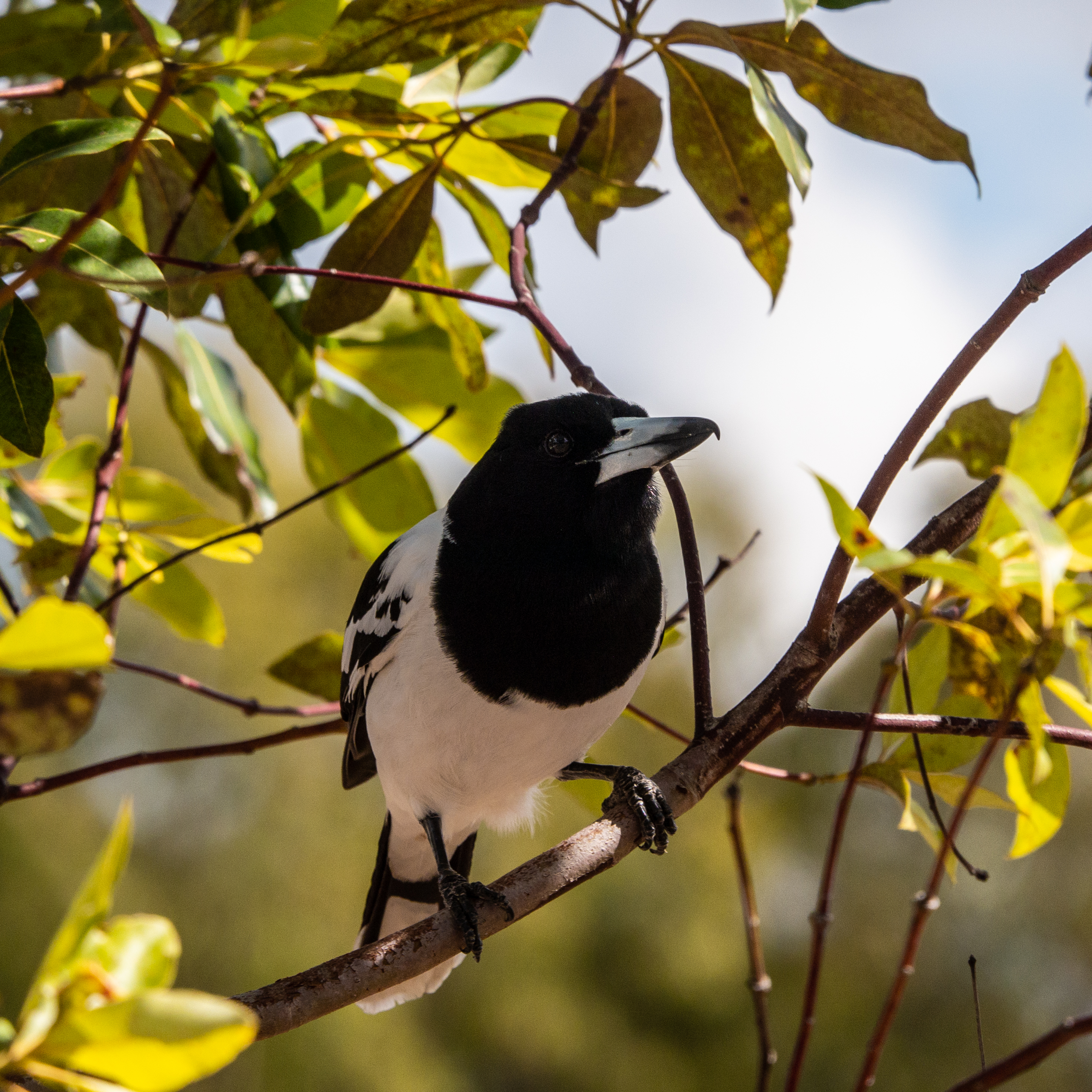
Pied butcherbird

Since 2005, Taylor has recorded the song of the pied butcherbird, an Australian songbird known for its unusually complex and beautiful singing, and used it to compose Absolute Bird: Concerto for Recorder and Orchestra, which was performed in 2017 by the Adelaide Symphony Orchestra. She co-composed with Jon Rose Bitter Springs Creek 2014, which featured butcherbird songs she recorded in the MacDonnell Ranges in 2014

In 2017, she produced a double album, Absolute Bird, which featured birdsong, cane toad, and other field recordings.

=== Academic research ===
According to the Sydney Morning Herald, Taylor "established that not only is it possible to identify individual birds by their calls but that those calls evolve over time." She has argued that birdsong is music; traditional musicology excludes anything not created by humans. Taylor argues that the song of the pied butcherbird, in addition to being a form of communication, has an aesthetic character, with technique and inventiveness similar to human compositions, and that along with behavioral evidence supports the conclusion that birds have an aesthetic sensibility which may be analogous to that of humans.

In 2019, Taylor was appointed an Australia Research Council Future Fellow at Macquarie University.

=== Books ===
- Is Birdsong Music? (2017). Indiana University Press. ISBN 978-0-253-02666-8

== Recognition ==
In 2025 Taylor and her partner, Jon Rose, were awarded the Richard Gill Award for Distinguished Services to Australian Music by the Australasian Performing Arts Association and the Australian Music Centre.

== Personal life ==
Taylor has lived in Sydney since 2002. She has both US and Australian citizenship. Her partner is Jon Rose.
