= Supertwink =

2006 American comedy film by Richard Christy and Sal Governale

- Poster
- Directed by: Richard Christy; Sal Governale
- Written by: Richard Christy; Sal Governale
- Produced by: Howard TV
- Starring: JD Harmeyer; High Pitch Eric; Richard Christy; Sal Governale; Joey Boots; Artie Lange; Benjy Bronk; Steve "Wood-Yi" Freid
- Distributed by: Howard TV
- Release date: January 4, 2006
- Running time: 30 minutes
- Country: United States
- Language: English
- Budget: ~$4,000

Supertwink is a 2006 American comedy film directed, written, and filmed by Richard Christy and Sal Governale. Produced and made for subscribers of Howard TV, an In Demand digital cable service operated by Howard Stern, the film stars members of Stern's radio show staff and "Wack Packers". The film premiered at the Pioneer Theater in New York City on January 4, 2006.

Despite claims that the film had a $4,000 budget, Christy stated on Stern's radio show that he spent no more than $700. When Stern asked Roger Ebert and Richard Roeper to review the film, Ebert refused to watch it, while Roeper's pan was run over the film's ending credits. According to producer Doug Goodstein, Stern has distanced himself from the film.

== Premise ==
An evil heterosexual supervillain Dr. Hetero (High Pitch Eric), vows to destroy the homosexual world. Supertwink (J.D. Harmeyer) is called to save the day.

== Cast ==
- JD Harmeyer as Supertwink and Bo Cocky
- Benjamin Bronk as Queen Benjamin
- Steve Freid as Lord Rectum
- Dan "The Song Parody Man" Cooper as Boy Servant
- Sal Governale as Paxton Fudge and Captain Sack
- Richard Christy as Rusty Peters
- Office Gazers: Doug Goodstein, Isaac Mark, Mike Gange, Scott DePace, Chris Costa, Sean Gordon, Glenn Stockfisch
- High Pitch Eric as Dr. Hetero
- Mike Bocchetti as Cock Hudson
- Cock Hudson's Bar Dancers: Gay Ramone, Thomas J. Gorham, Brian O'Toole Jr., Joey Boots, Duane C. Cecil, Michael Denicola
- Ronnie "The Limo Driver" Mund as Cock Hudson's Bar Doorman
- Artie Lange as Cock Hudson's Bar Plumber
- Fred "The Elephant Boy" as Man With A Gerbil Stuck In His Ass
- Will Murray as Cum Faced Man
- Tony Landolfi as Glitter Boy
- Joey Boots as Fagola
- Dr. Hetero's Women: Geraldine Gutierrez, Champagne Gillis, Seven von Sin
- Gary the Retard as Man Under Paxton Fudge's Desk
