= Richard Christy =

American radio personality and drummer

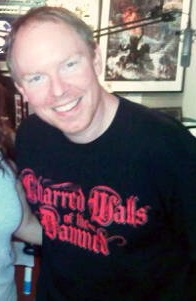
- Christy in 2010

Background information
- Born: Thomas Richard Christy Jr. April 1, 1974 (age 52); Fort Scott, Kansas, U.S.
- Genres: Heavy metal; death metal; technical death metal; progressive metal; power metal; thrash metal
- Occupations: Musician; radio personality; comedian
- Instrument: Drums
- Years active: 1992–present
- Member of: Charred Walls of the Damned
- Formerly of: Death, Control Denied, Iced Earth, Acheron
- Website: richardchristy.com

Thomas Richard Christy Jr. (born April 1, 1974) is an American drummer, musician, comedian, and radio personality, best known for being the former drummer for several heavy metal bands since the early 1990s, most notably Death, and his tenure on The Howard Stern Show. Born and raised in Kansas, Christy took an interest in rock and heavy metal music in his youth, and started playing the drums at age ten. He played in several bands while at school.

Christy's music career began in 1992 when he joined the Springfield, Missouri group Public Assassin, and also worked as an electrician. In 1996, Christy formed Burning Inside and relocated to Orlando, Florida, where he joined and toured with several popular heavy metal bands until 2004, including Acheron, Death, Control Denied, Iced Earth, and Leash Law.

In 2004, Christy took a break from music and relocated to New York City to join The Howard Stern Show. He has written, directed, and acted in several home made independent films and has performed as a stand-up comedian. He returned to music in 2009 when he formed his own metal band, Charred Walls of the Damned.

== Early life ==
Thomas Richard Christy was born in Fort Scott, Kansas on April 1, 1974. His father is a Vietnam veteran. Christy grew up in the nearby town of Redfield, on a "farm in the middle of nowhere". According to the 2020 census, the town has a population of 90. He became a fan of Kiss and Meat Loaf from four years old when his aunt introduced him to them and bought him their albums a year later. His elder neighbor, a fan of heavy metal music, introduced him to Metal Health (1983) by Quiet Riot which had a considerable effect on Christy. He recalled, "I heard those drums and that music and was just blown away. I was new to that whole sound ... Quiet Riot felt like the next step up in terms of heaviness". He proceeded to save up his pocket money to purchase the album on audio cassette. Albums that influenced him during this time included Stay Hungry (1984) by Twisted Sister and Powerslave (1984) by Iron Maiden. In 1992, he started playing the guitar.

Christy wished to learn the drums after he heard "Hot for Teacher" by Van Halen, in 1984. His parents had no issue with his decision, and to this day, they remain supportive of his career. When he turned ten, his parents bought him his first drum pad and sticks, practicing on it before they purchased his first full professional kit at a junkyard for $100. Christy bought instructional videos to improve his technique, including tapes from Terry Bozzio. Later in his development, drummers Dave Lombardo and Pete Sandoval inspired him to play fast. He was also influenced by drummers Neil Peart , Frankie Banali, Mikkey Dee, Bobby Jarzombek, Sean Reinert, and Gene Hoglan. At fourteen, Christy attended his first concert, seeing Stryper and White Lion.

Christy's first group was playing in a school band in the mid-1980s which included a position in the school's marching band, playing the snare drum and tympani, which he particularly enjoyed, and wrote a song dedicated to the experience and his teachers named "Forever Marching On". He passed his school music exams, and played in his first "legitimate" rock group, Syzygy, at around fifteen which involved live gigs in local bars. Around this time, Christy formed a short lived "joke band", Bung Dizeez, along with Paul Brewer, Gary White, and sometimes Les Henderson. Their first gig took place "on a hay wagon at a keg party." The three wore jock straps over their clothes and performing parody songs and Judas Priest covers. In 1992, Christy graduated from Uniontown High School in Uniontown, Kansas, where he also lettered in baseball.

== Career ==
=== Music ===
In 1992, the 18-year-old Christy decided to pursue music in college in Kansas. In the week before he was set to begin, he heard one of his favorite bands, Public Assassin from Springfield, Missouri, were looking for a new drummer. After a successful audition in August 1992, he chose to join them rather than study. He then moved from his Fort Scott home and into "an old warehouse" in Springfield, and played on "Raw as Fuck", a same-titled mini-CD, and a demo titled Murdered. They toured the midwest across 1993, playing covers. As he needed further income to support himself, Christy learned to become a residential electrician. In December 1993, Christy and Public Assassin guitarist Steve Childers formed a comical group, Skip Skiffington and The Elite, with Skiffington on vocals and Rick Granberg on keyboards. During this time, Christy played in a "joke punk band" with several friends named Pisser, playing GG Allin and Cocknoose covers. In 1995, Public Assassin disbanded after Christy and Childers had several differences with singer/bassist Greg Ponder.

In late 1995, Christy and Childers formed technical death metal band Burning Inside with new recruits Jamie Prim on vocals/bass and, later on, Michael Estes on guitar. To increase their potential, the group relocated in February 1996 to Orlando, Florida, an area favorable for the metal scene. Christy arrived by car, carrying everything he owned. They toured, recorded songs for five metal tribute albums, and produced a six-song demo tape of new material released as The Eve of the Entities (2000). Christy stayed in Florida for eight years. His income from music and electric work was limited, so he could only afford accommodation in a storage unit where he also kept and practiced his drums for as much as six hours each day. With only an outside garden hose to shower with, he later wrote a song about his appreciation for more comfortable living named "The Beast Outside My Window". Christy joined local metal group Acheron, touring and playing on Anti-God, Anti-Christ (1996) and Necromanteion Communion (1998). His boss at his electrical company allowed him to spend time away to record and tour with his bands.

In 1997, Christy met fellow Orlando resident, singer and guitarist Chuck Schuldiner, in a chance encounter at a Florida book store in Altamonte Mall. Schuldiner was, and remains, an influential figure in Christy's career. Christy was a big fan of Schuldiner's metal band Death. He was aware that the band needed a drummer and his friends B.C Richards and Rick Renstrom of Wicked Ways suggested his name to Chuck and he was offered an audition. Christy knew "all of their albums ... back and forth", and auditioned in July 1997 with only Schuldiner and himself present. The audition was a success, and Christy played on The Sound of Perseverance (1998), which he called "the album I'm most proud of". In May 1998, Christy toured Europe for four months with Death, which included a spot at the Dynamo Open Air festival in the Netherlands in front of 35,000 people. A friendship and musical camaraderie with Schuldiner also brought Christy into the line-up of Schuldiner's progressive metal group, the more melodic Control Denied. Christy played drums on their debut album, The Fragile Art of Existence (1999) and When Man and Machine Collide, an incomplete album that is yet to be released. The two became close friends, and Christy would spend several Thanksgiving holidays with Schuldiner's family. In December 2001, Schuldiner died from brain cancer. Christy remains close with the family.

Between 1999 and 2004, Christy became a member of Iced Earth and Leash Law, timing his schedule in order to perform in multiple bands at once. In April 2000, he played with Incantation on their tour in support of The Infernal Storm (2000), playing to audiences of several hundred at each show. Afterwards, he toured Europe with Demons and Wizards, playing festivals of up to 20,000 people in attendance. He landed the gig in Iced Earth through contacts he knew at Century Media Records, a prominent heavy metal label. His first live gigs with them followed in August 2000, playing festivals including the Wacken Open Air festival in Germany.

In 2004, Christy began a five-and-a-half year hiatus as an active musician, but kept in touch with the metal scene by practicing his drums, attending local concerts, and writing articles for several publications. By 2008, he started to write new material, playing the guitar more than he had done previously, and ended up with an entire album in demo form. He signed a recording deal with Metal Blade Records in 2009 to release an album with his metal supergroup, Charred Walls of the Damned. He asked his first choice of musicians to take part in the project: bassist Steve Di Giorgio, vocalist Tim "Ripper" Owens and guitarist Jason Suecof. It took roughly three months for Christy to settle on the band's name, and had around 200 possible names as "every good band name has been taken". Their self-titled debut album was released in 2010. Their second, Cold Winds on Timeless Days, followed in 2011. Christy named the latter as the first letter of each word matched the band's initials.

Christy has performed live with Dream Theater, "A Favor House Atlantic" with Coheed and Cambria, Tiwanaku, Rick Renstrom, and Wykked Wytch.

Sometime after 2011, Christy put together music that featured his three guinea pigs. Three of the songs were released under the band name Boar Glue as part of a split EP with Hatebeak, another band that features an African grey parrot.

=== The Howard Stern Show ===
Christy became an avid listener of The Howard Stern Show in 1996 when he moved to Florida, listening to the program "every morning religiously" with headphones while he worked as an electrician. After he obtained the number to reach the show's answering machine from the Internet, he began to submit comical voicemail messages in 1999, that were played frequently on the air. From 2001, Christy began to send in song parodies and bits about staffers Robin Quivers and K.C. Armstrong. He made his debut appearance on April 24, 2003, when the show was broadcast from the Hard Rock Hotel and Casino in Las Vegas. Christy lost a round of blackjack in hope of winning a date with a porn star.

Following the departure of "Stuttering John" Melendez in February 2004, Stern announced the Get John's Job contest a month later, pitting ten listeners who had contributed to the show against each other in competition for the vacated position. Each contestant was given a week to display their talents they could bring to the show, after which the listeners voted online for their favorite. Christy produced a required demo CD of his bits, and was selected to compete for the prize of an initial three-month contract and $25,000. Leaving Iced Earth was a difficult decision for Christy, but felt he could not waste the opportunity to pursue his "dream job" and work for Stern. He had also grown tired of living in Florida, and wished to move. On July 1, 2004, Christy won the contest with 30% of the vote; Sal Governale was second with 24%. By September 2004, both had joined the show as full-time staff members. Christy then relocated from Florida to New York City, where the show is based.

Christy has become known on the show for his prank calls, song parodies, and outrageous stunts, usually performed with Governale. He faced challengers in porn trivia in Stump the Perv, vomited on guests, received a bikini wax, and painted his genitals. From 2005, Christy performed nationwide as a stand-up comedian as part of the Killers of Comedy Tour with other show cast members.

In 2006, the show relocated to Sirius XM Radio. Christy hosted a semi-regular metal show on the Liquid Metal channel named Richard Christy's Heavy Metal Hoedown. Christy also hosted Inside the Porn Actors Studio on Howard 101, an interview series that parodied the television series Inside the Actors Studio with porn actresses, with Christy filling the role of host James Lipton.

=== Film and television ===
Christy once dreamed of a career in film after he saw Brad Pitt, from nearby Springfield, Missouri, in Interview with the Vampire. He hung up posters of Pitt in his New York City apartment, and once worked at a computer store owned by Pitt's parents. He has been a fan of horror films since his youth, and rates Halloween (1978) as his "faaavorite". In the mid-1990s, while living in Missouri, he started to make his own independent, low budget films. His first, Evil Ned 2, a horror comedy was made in 1994. This was followed by its sequel, Evil Ned 3: The Return of Evil Ned 2 – Electric Boogaloo, in 1995, with a plot involving "dirty magazines, huge hog testicles, gay monsters, Amish erotica, and evil talking ducks". The film was produced for $250, "200 of which was spent on beer". The film premiered at a Missouri hotel, and was made available online in 2007. In 2001, Christy released his feature-length film, Leaving Grunion County. Its premiere was held at the Enzian Theater in Maitland, Florida that April.

In 2006, Christy and Governale wrote, directed, and starred in the 30-minute comedy film Supertwink for Stern's on-demand digital cable service Howard Stern On Demand. It premiered at the Pioneer Theater in New York City on January 4, 2006. The film was reviewed by critic Richard Roeper, who panned it. In 2007, Christy appeared in Harold & Kumar Escape from Guantanamo Bay playing the role of a Ku Klux Klansman named Kenny. In the same year, he landed his first television role on Rescue Me, portraying a "really creepy guy at end of bar". In 2009, he appeared as Caleb in the horror film Albino Farm. Also in 2009, Christy and Governale appeared in the 2009 horror novel Castaways, written by horror and crime novelist Brian Keene. Christy has recorded voiceovers for the Adult Swim shows Metalocalypse and Rick and Morty. He guest appeared on the Cartoon Network series Uncle Grandpa, playing Ric. He appeared in the 2014 comedy horror Jersey Shore Massacre. Christy later made a cameo in Guardians of the Galaxy Vol. 2 as a character simply named "Down There!"

Christy has written articles for Decibel magazine about his love for horror films, named "Richard Christy's Horrorscope".

== Personal life ==
Christy married Kristin Jenco on July 30, 2011, in New York City. They have one son, Carson Cain Christy, born in 2017, and affectionately known as "Bubby". Carson is named after former Philadelphia Eagles quarterback Carson Wentz. The Eagles are Kristin's favorite team. If they have another son, they plan to name him Patrick after Kansas City Chiefs quarterback Patrick Mahomes. The Chiefs are Richard's favorite team. Prior to Super Bowl LIV, on the Howard Stern Wrap Up Show, Christy met Patrick Mahomes and tearfully told him that he loved him and explained his intention to name his next son after him. He later named his second son Cameron instead. He is also a Kansas City Royals fan and attended the 2015 World Series between the Royals and New York Mets with fellow Howard Stern Show co-worker Gary Dell'Abate (who is an avid Mets fan).

== Discography ==
With Acheron

- Anti-God, Anti-Christ (1996)
- Necromanteion Communion/Raise the Dead (1998)

With Death

- The Sound of Perseverance (1998)
- Live in Eindhoven (1998)
- Live in L.A. (Death & Raw) (1999)

With Control Denied

- The Fragile Art of Existence (1999)
- When Man and Machine Collide (unreleased)

With Burning Inside

- The Eve of the Entities (2000)
- Apparition (2001)

With Iced Earth

- Horror Show (2001)
- Tribute to the Gods (2002)
- The Glorious Burden (2004)

With Leash Law

- Dogface (2003)
- Cunninglinguistics (2007)

With Charred Walls of the Damned

- Charred Walls of the Damned (2010)
- Cold Winds on Timeless Days (2011)
- Creatures Watching Over the Dead (2016)

With Boar Glue

- Glue 'Em All (2018) split with Hatebeak
