= Hatebeak =

American death metal band

- Origin: Baltimore, Maryland, United States
- Genres: Death metal, grindcore
- Years active: 2003–2009, 2015–present
- Label: Reptilian Records
- Members: Mark Sloan; Waldo the Parrot
- Past members: Blake Harrison

Hatebeak is an American death metal band formed by Blake Harrison and Mark Sloan, featuring the grey parrot Waldo (b. 1991). Hatebeak is reported to be the first band with an avian vocalist. They never tour to not distress Waldo. Hatebeak is signed to Reptilian Records. They released the album Number of the Beak on June 26, 2015, through Reptilian Records.

The band's sound has been described as "a jackhammer being ground in a compactor". Aquarius Records magazine called Hatebeak "furious and blasting death metal". Hatebeak made its second record with Caninus, a band whose lead singers were two dogs. Hatebeak's goal is to "raise the bar for extreme music".

== Band members ==
- Waldo the Parrot – vocals
- Mark Sloan – guitar, bass

== Past members ==
- Blake Harrison – drums (died 2024)

== Discography ==
- Beak of Putrefaction split with Longmont Potion Castle (2004)
- Bird Seeds of Vengeance split with Caninus (2005)
- The Thing That Should Not Beak split with Birdflesh (2007)
- The Number of the Beak (2015)
- Birdhouse By The Cemetery split with Boar Glue (2018)

== See also ==
- Zoomusicology
- Biomusic
- Caninus
