= Burning Inside =

American technical death metal band

Burning Inside was an American technical death metal band formed in winter of 1995. The group featured drummer Richard Christy, who was known for his tenure with pioneering death metal band Death.

Decibel described their sound as "Morbid Angel worship", and said their demo was among the best of 1995.

AllMusic said Burning Inside were "one of the few death metal bands to develop true technical skill." The band's lyrical themes include mental illness and witch hunting. Their debut album was called The Eve of the Entities, and was released on October 31, 2000, through Pavement Music. The band's second album was called Apparition, released one year later through Crash Music. AllMusic said the album "reflected a melodic love of blood and brutality."
