= Wykked Wytch =

American metal band

- Origin: Hollywood, Florida, U.S.
- Genres: Black metal, gothic metal
- Years active: 1994- present
- Labels: Demolition Records (1996-2003); Dreamcather Records (2004-2007); Perish Music Group (2008-present)
- Members: Ipek Warnock; Gio Geraca; Kenny; Salvatore LoPresti; Sean Young; Steven Brubaker
- Past members: Mark Warnock (guitars); Sean Tibbetts (bass); David (guitars); Barry Myers (bass); Pat Aylward (bass); Ben Kuzay (bass); Jeremy Deacon (bass); Steve Brubaker (drums); Harry Ketterer (drums); Koos (drums); Richard Christy (drums)
- Website: Wykked Wytch

Wykked Wytch is an American black metal band from Hollywood, Florida.

== Biography ==
The band released its first album, Something Wykked This Way Comes, in 1996 on its own label, Cauldron Records. Demolition Records, a UK-based metal label, re-issued the album with two additional tracks for European distribution.

Work began on a second album in 1999. Angelic Vengeance was recorded at Damage Studios in Italy and released in 2001.

They recorded demos for a third album, Nefret, in 2002 at Audiohammer Studios in Florida with engineer Jason Suecof and session drummer Richard Christy. The album was recorded in 2003 at Studio 13 in Florida and released in 2004 by Demolition/Dreamcatcher Records with cover art by Chad Michael Ward, who had designed the cover for Angelic Vengeance.

They toured with Carpathian Forest and the No Mercy festivals in 2005, then returned home and began work on a fourth album, recording three demos before leaving on tour with Deicide in October.

They signed with UK label SixSixSix Records in 2006 but soon left. Their self-financed fourth album, Memories of a Dying Whore, was recorded at Redroom Recorders in Tampa, Florida and released in 2007 by Perish Music. Before the completion of the album, Wykked Wytch would join Hanzel and Gretyl and Bella Morte for a short US tour "Oktotenfest" in the Fall of 2006.

In 2008, the band released two cover songs and videos; the songs were "Sweet Dreams (Are Made of This)" from Eurythmics and "Bring Me to Life" from Evanescence.

In 2012, they released their album The Ultimate Deception, and toured the United States as an opening act for Soulfly. In the middle of that year, the band went on indefinite hiatus, on which they remain.

== Members ==
Current line-up

- Ipek Warnock - Vocals
- Nate Poulson - Guitar, bass, programming
- Salvatore LoPresti - Keyboards

Former members

- Mark Warlokk - Guitar
- Gio Geraca - Guitar
- Sean Young - Guitar
- Kenny B - Bass
- Jeremy Deacon - Bass
- Sean Tibbetts - Bass
- David - Bass, guitar
- Barry Myers - Bass
- Pat Aylward - Bass
- Ben Kuzay - Bass
- Tomb Radley - Bass
- Steve Brubaker - Drums
- Harry Ketterer - Drums
- Cj Tollis - Drums
- John Rae - Drums
- Koos - Drums
- Chris Morini - Drums
- Richard Christy - Drums
- Lenny Warmbrandt - Bass

== Discography ==
Demos

- Nefret (2002)
- Awakened (2006)

Albums

- Something Wykked This Way Comes (1996) (Re-release in (2000) with extra two tracks)
- Angelic Vengeance (2001)
- Nefret (2004)
- Memories of a Dying Whore (2008)
- The Ultimate Deception (2012)

Videos

- "The Soul Awaits" (2004)
- "Sweet Dreams" (2008) (Eurythmics Cover)
- "Awakened" (2008)
- "Bring Me to Life" (2008) (Evanescence Cover)

Promo Videos

- 2008: Making the Video Sweet Dreams
- 2008: Promo Trailer Sweet Dreams
