= Charred Walls of the Damned =

American heavy metal band

- Origin: United States
- Genres: Heavy metal, thrash metal
- Years active: 2009–present
- Label: Metal Blade
- Members: Richard Christy; Steve Di Giorgio; Tim "Ripper" Owens; Jason Suecof

Charred Walls of the Damned is an American heavy metal supergroup formed in 2009 consisting of drummer Richard Christy, bassist Steve Di Giorgio, vocalist Tim "Ripper" Owens and guitarist Jason Suecof. The band was formed by Christy after a five-year absence from the metal scene since joining The Howard Stern Show in 2004. They have released three studio albums.

== History ==
=== Formation ===
While Iced Earth were on their 2004 Glorious Burden tour, drummer Richard Christy decided to depart from the band, thus postponing upcoming dates in Japan. He became a finalist in "Get John's Job", a listener contest on The Howard Stern Show to replace "Stuttering John" Melendez, who left to become the announcer for The Tonight Show with Jay Leno. Having not participated would have made him "regret it every day of [his] life". On July 1, 2004, Christy won the contest with 30% of the listener vote.

With his busy work schedule in New York City, Christy kept in touch with his musical roots. He built confidence in his guitar playing and song writing, putting together an entire demo album of material. He returned from a 5 1/2-year absence from music, announcing his new band, Charred Walls of the Damned. The origin of its name was explained on May 20, 2009. It derives from a series of radio prank calls he and Sal Governale made to a Tradio show on a Christian radio station. In response to the pranks they received, the host described how he prays for them, thus "saving their soul to be saved by God's grace...not in the devil's hell where you'd be putting your nails in the charred walls of the damned".

=== Debut album and tour ===
Charred Walls of the Damned

Studio album by Charred Walls of the Damned
- Released: February 2, 2010
- Recorded: Audiohammer Studios (Sanford, Florida)
- Length: 35:36
- Label: Metal Blade
- Producer: Jason Suecof

The band's first single, "Ghost Town", was released on December 1, 2009. Their debut album, Charred Walls of the Damned, was released on compact disc and iTunes on February 2, 2010. Blabbermouth.net reported around 2,200 copies were sold in the United States in its first week of release. The Japanese version of the album includes a cover version of "Nice Dreams" by Minneapolis metal group Powermad. The album entered Billboard's "Heatseekers", "Independent Albums" and "Hard Music Albums" charts at No. 6, 37 and 46 respectively. It also reached No. 85 on the Canadian "Independent Chart". On January 5, 2011, Christy reported the album sold 20,000 copies worldwide.

Overall, the album was well received by critics. English on-line music magazine Rocksnail, with its award of 3.5 out of 5, noted the band's potential if they convey such material live. Dom Lawson of Bravewords praised the album with an 8.5 out of 10, hailing it as "a platinum-plated triumph" which "absolutely lives up to every expectation on a musical level." He pointed out the pairing of Christy and Di Giorgio as a "particularly inspired touch", particularly on "Blood on Wood". Chris Akin from Pitriff, who awarded the album 8 out of 10, identified a "distinct chemistry" between the four musicians, with the album delivering "terrific, old school sounding metal". Though he believed the album achieved its "pure, out-and-out metal" aim, Andy Lye from Jukebox:Metal argued it "sounds somewhat disjointed ... like parts of it were recorded very separately and only partially successfully spliced together afterwards." Lye believed at 35 minutes the album was "far too short", believing it "could and should have been so much better given the talent involved."

2010 tour dates
Date	City	Country	Venue
July 1	Chicago, Illinois	United States	The Empty Bottle
July 2	Detroit, Michigan	United States	Harpos Concert Theatre
July 3	Montreal, Quebec	Canada	Les Foufounes Électriques
July 4	Toronto, Ontario	Canada	The Opera House
July 6	Cleveland, Ohio	United States	Peabody's Downunder
July 7	Pittsburgh, Pennsylvania	United States	Diesel Night Club
July 8	New York City, New York	United States	Gramercy Theater
July 9	West Chester, Pennsylvania	United States	The Note
July 10	Worcester, Massachusetts	United States	Worcester Palladium

In July 2010, the band performed for the first time in the United States and Canada. The nine-date tour featured replacements John Comprix and Matt Sorg on guitar and Ed Stephens on bass.

Charred Walls of the Damned
No.	Title	Length
1.	"Ghost Town"	4:56
2.	"From the Abyss"	4:25
3.	"Creating Our Machine"	2:53
4.	"Blood on Wood"	3:26
5.	"In a World So Cruel"	3:31
6.	"Manifestations"	3:06
7.	"Voices Within the Walls"	3:48
8.	"The Darkest Eyes"	3:37
9.	"Fear in the Sky"	5:42

Japanese release
No.	Title	Length
10.	"Nice Dreams"	3:37

=== Cold Winds on Timeless Days ===
Cold Winds on Timeless Days

Studio album by Charred Walls of the Damned
- Released: October 11, 2011
- Recorded: Audiohammer Studios (Sanford, Florida); Hit Factory Criteria Studios (Miami, Florida)
- Length: 57:56
- Label: Metal Blade
- Producer: Jason Suecof

Christy began writing new material for the second album during the mixing of their first, making a conscious effort to write that catered the playing style of each member, including Suecof's method of production. The result was a 12-song demo tape that sounded similar to the first album which the band developed their ideas from. During the 2010 Christmas period, Christy recorded his drum tracks at Criteria Studios in Miami, Florida in two-and-a-half days. The rest of the album was recorded in January and February 2011 at Audiohammer Studios. Cold Winds on Timeless Days runs for 58 minutes and was released on October 11, 2011. The album sold nearly 1,500 copies in its first week of release in the US, and peaked at No. 14 on the Billboard Heatseekers Chart.

Cold Winds on Timeless Days
No.	Title	Length
1.	"Timeless Days"	6:24
2.	"Ashes Falling Upon Us"	4:21
3.	"Zerospan"	5:25
4.	"Cold Winds"	3:38
5.	"Lead the Way"	5:00
6.	"Forever Marching On"	7:18
7.	"Guiding Me"	4:50
8.	"The Beast Outside My Window"	4:09
9.	"On Unclean Ground"	6:33
10.	"Bloodworm"	3:06
11.	"Admire the Heroes"	5:22
12.	"Avoid the Light"	10:00

=== Creatures Watching Over the Dead ===
Creatures Watching over the Dead

Studio album by Charred Walls of the Damned
- Released: September 23, 2016
- Recorded: Audiohammer Studios (Sanford, Florida)
- Length: 33:16
- Label: Metal Blade
- Producer: Jason Suecof

The band reconvened at Audiohammer Studios for their third album in productive recording sessions. Christy put down his drum parts in one day and DiGiorgio had finished recording in two. Creatures Watching Over the Dead was released on September 23, 2016.

Creatures Watching Over the Dead
No.	Title	Length
1.	"My Eyes"	4:29
2.	"The Soulless"	4:03
3.	"Afterlife"	2:53
4.	"As I Catch My Breath"	5:02
5.	"Lies"	3:30
6.	"Reach Into the Light"	2:39
7.	"Tear Me Down"	3:50
8.	"Living in the Shadow of Yesterday"	3:36
9.	"Time Has Passed"	3:15

== Band members ==
- Richard Christy – drums
- Steve Di Giorgio – bass guitar
- Tim "Ripper" Owens – lead vocals
- Jason Suecof – guitar

== Discography ==
=== Studio albums ===
- Charred Walls of the Damned (2010)
- Cold Winds on Timeless Days (2011)
- Creatures Watching Over the Dead (2016)

=== Singles ===
- "Ghost Town" (2009)
- "Zerospan" (2011)
- "The Soulless" (2016)

== Videography ==
- The Making of Charred Walls of the Damned (2010)
