= Zoomusicology =

Field of musicology and zoology that studies the music of animals

Zoomusicology (/ˌzoʊəmjuːzɪˈkɒlədʒi/) is the study of the musical aspects of sound and communication as produced and perceived by animals. It is a field of musicology and zoology, and is a type of zoosemiotics. Zoomusicology as a field dates to François-Bernard Mâche's 1983 book Music, Myth, and Nature, or the Dolphins of Arion (published in English in 1992), and has been developed more recently by scholars such as Dario Martinelli, David Rothenberg, Hollis Taylor, David Teie, and Emily Doolittle.

Zoomusicology is a separate field from ethnomusicology, the study of human music.

Zoomusicologists in a wide range of fields including music, semiotics, philosophy and biology conduct zoomusicology research. This is because the field of zoomusicology is so broad and reaches many disciplines. Musician and zoomusicologist Hollis Taylor has conducted an extensive study of the Pied Butcherbird (Cracticus nigrogularis) over the past 15 years, including interdisciplinary research with philosophers and scientists. Clarinetist, and philosopher David Rothenberg plays music with animals, and has written books on the relationship between bird, insect, and whale song and human music. Composer Emily Doolittle has written numerous pieces based on animal songs, and has published interdisciplinary music-science research on the hermit thrush and the musician wren. Heavy metal bands such as Hatebeak, Caninus, Naegleria Fowleri, and Boar Glue have released music fronted by a grey parrot, a pit bull, an Amazon parrot, and a guinea pig, respectively. Susan Belanger has also contributed to the field of zoomusicology, with her work on soft song in the Asian corn borer moth (Ostrinia furnacalis) and its relationship to the initiation of mating behaviour. Researcher Patricia Gray has examined the music that can be seen in whales and songbirds. David Teie has composed species-specific music for tamarin monkeys and cats based on his theory of the emotional origins of music.

== Human-animal interactions ==
There have been several musicians over the years who have performed with or for animals, hoping to elicit responses. Examples include: the song "Seamus" from Pink Floyd's 1971 album Meddle featuring Steve Marriott's Border Collie Seamus howling along to an acoustic blues song. The performance was repeated in "Mademoiselle Nobs" for the film Pink Floyd: Live at Pompeii (1972) with a different dog, Nobs. Paul Horn played flute to Haida, an orca living at Sealand of the Pacific in Victoria, British Columbia on his album Inside II (1972), though the response was merely spyhopping. Paul Winter played his saxophone for both wolves (who howled) and gray whales (who did not) on his album Common Ground (1978). Composer Jim Nollman plays guitar and wooden flute to such species as whales, wolves and turkeys. David Rothenberg, a clarinetist, has played to humpback whales, cicadas and birds (2005–2013) with no apparent response.

Composer David Sulzer, under the name David Soldier and the Thai Elephant Orchestra, built giant percussion instruments for the elephants at the National Elephant Institute at Lampang to play, with minimal human direction.

Composers have long evoked or imitated animal sounds in compositions, including Antonio Vivaldi's The Four Seasons (Vivaldi) (1720), Jean-Philippe Rameau's The Hen (1728), Camille Saint-Saëns's The Carnival of the Animals (1886), Jean Sibelius's The Swan of Tuonela (1895), Frederick Delius's On Hearing the First Cuckoo in Spring (1912), Ralph Vaughan Williams's The Lark Ascending (Vaughan Williams) (1914), Ottorino Respighi's Pines of Rome (1924) and The Birds (1928), Ferde Grofé's Grand Canyon Suite (1931), Olivier Messiaen's Catalogue of the Birds (1956–58), George Crumb's Vox Balaenae (Voice of the Whale) (1971), and Pauline Oliveros's El Relicario de los Animales (1977).

Some modern composers have included recordings of animals in their scores, including Alan Hovhaness's And God Created Great Whales (1970), Einojuhani Rautavaara's Cantus Arcticus (1972), Gabriel Pareyon's Invention over the song of the Vireo atriccapillus (1999) and Kha Pijpichtli Kuikatl (2003).

In 1960 American engineer Jim Fassett put together an album of slowed-down and re-arranged bird songs called Symphony of the Birds. Novelty songs pieced together from the sounds of dogs (The Singing Dogs) or cats (Jingle Cats) enjoyed brief popularity in the 1950s and 1960s. Field recording expert Bernie Krause in 1988 released a single ("Jungle Shoes"/"Fish Wrap") and an album (Gorillas in the Mix) of songs composed of animal and nature sounds. The Indian zoomusicologist, A. J. Mithra composed music using bird, animal and frog sounds from 2008 until his death in 2014. In that same year, New York beatboxing artist Ben Mirin began incorporating animal sounds into his beats.

== Music produced by animals ==
=== Birds ===
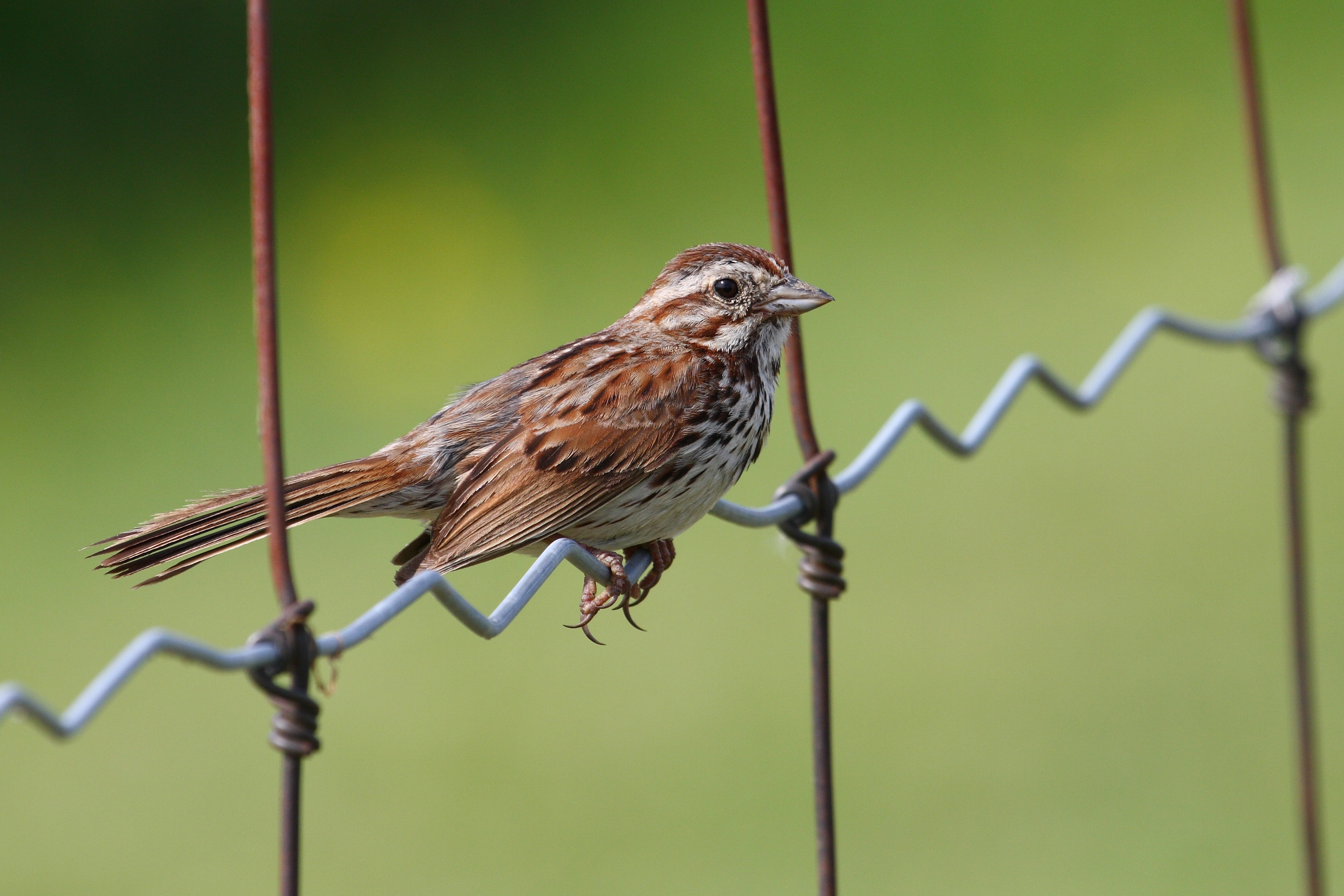
Song Sparrow

The most well-known form of music found in non-human animals is birdsong. Birdsong is different from normal calls. For example, a call will usually simply function to communicate a direct message. For instance, a bird call could be used to direct attention that a predator is near. Meanwhile, a song contains more repetition and usually will have distinct structure to it, with a specific beginning, middle, and end. In many species of songbirds, songs seem to be used both as a way to attract potential mates, as well as to mark and defend one's territory. It has been observed that young songbirds acquire their ability to produce song from imitation of adult birds. There seems to be a critical period for song learning. In one experiment, they compared birds raised in isolation, (this involved isolation from other birds as well as the vocalizations of other birds), with those raised in a colony, without these forms of isolation. Using an fMRI scan and the blood oxygen level dependent (BOLD) as a measurement of brain activity, it was found that birds raised in the isolation condition did not appear to show a preference between their own songs and a repetitive song. Meanwhile, colony-raised birds showed a stronger reaction to their own song being played back.

=== Mimicry ===
Several species of birds can mimic the songs of other birds, or even mechanical sounds. These include, with varying degrees of success, starlings, mockingbirds, thrashers, crows and ravens, parrots, myna birds, blue jays, lyrebirds, Lawrence's thrushes, Acrocephalus, marsh warblers, and others. Mozart kept a starling that could mimic some of his music.

== Functions and effects of music on animals ==
=== Mammals ===
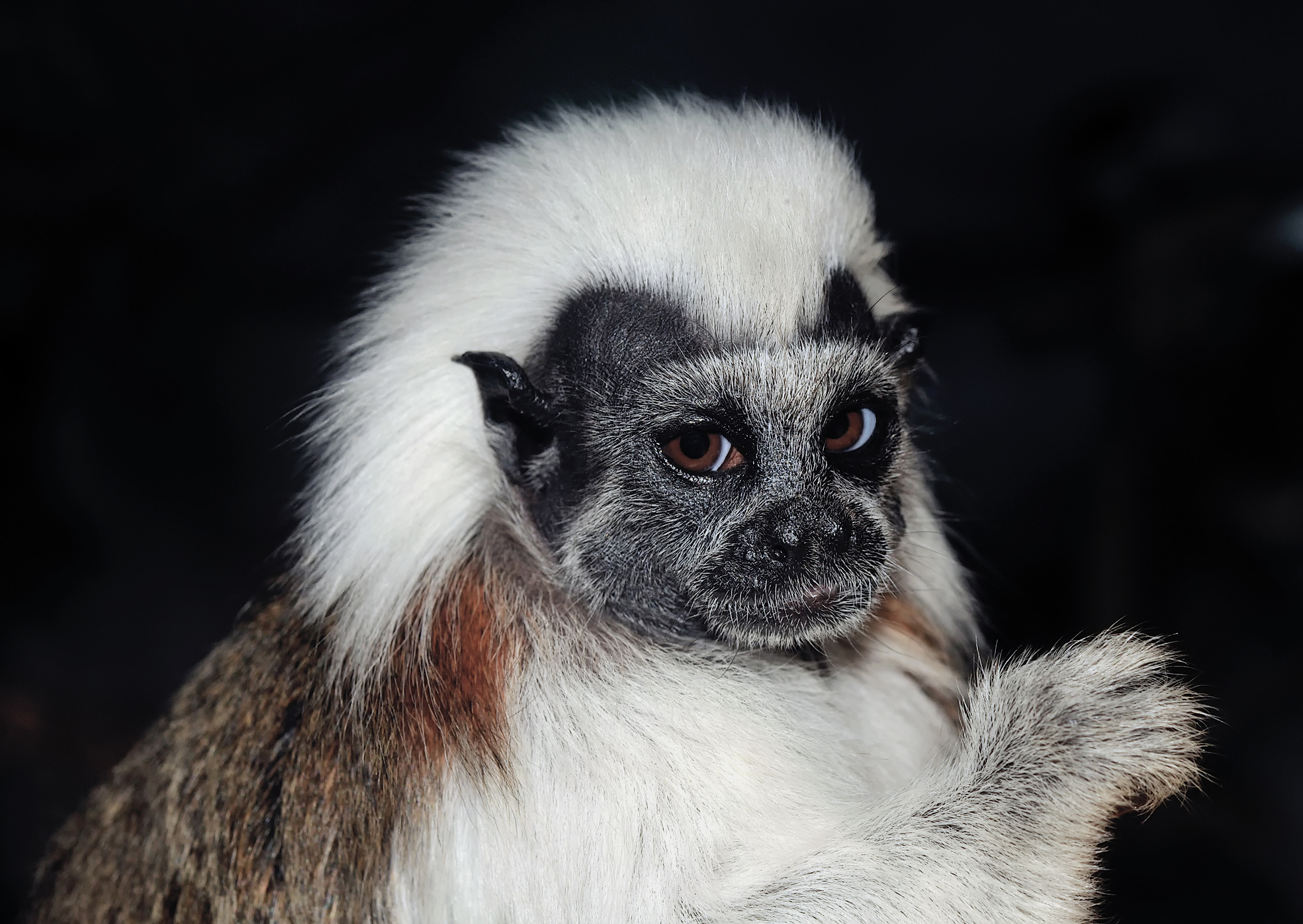
Saguinus oedipus (Linnaeus, 1758)

Snowden and Teie performed an experiment on Cotton-top tamarins (Saguinus oedipus) to determine if music would lead to behavioural changes, and whether music made by other species would elicit similar behavioural responses as the music of one's own species. This experiment involved two separate categories of music - one was affiliation-based, the other was fear/threat-based music. Within the two categories, the experimenter varied whether the music was produced by humans or tamarins. During the experiment, a baseline behaviour measurement was established, proceeded by the experimental condition, which was a piece of music that was played for 30 seconds. Following this, behaviour was analyzed for a total of five minutes. This analysis was made by an observer who was unaware of the true hypothesis of the experiment, and simply noted different behaviours which they had witnessed. The experimenters found that the tamarins altered their behaviour specifically when listening to tamarin music. For example, when music from the affiliation condition was played, the behavioural response of the tamarins involved a decrease in overall movement and an increase in both social and foraging behaviour. This contrasted the behaviour observed when the fear/threat based music was played. During this condition, the tamarins were more likely to move around and show anxiety-based behaviour, as well as, an increase in social behaviour similar to that seen in the affiliation condition. Although the tamarins did not show behavioural changes to human music as clearly as they did to their species-specific music, there was some behavioural change. The tamarins showed decreased movement when listening to human fear/threat based music and a decrease in anxious behaviour when listening to human affiliation music.

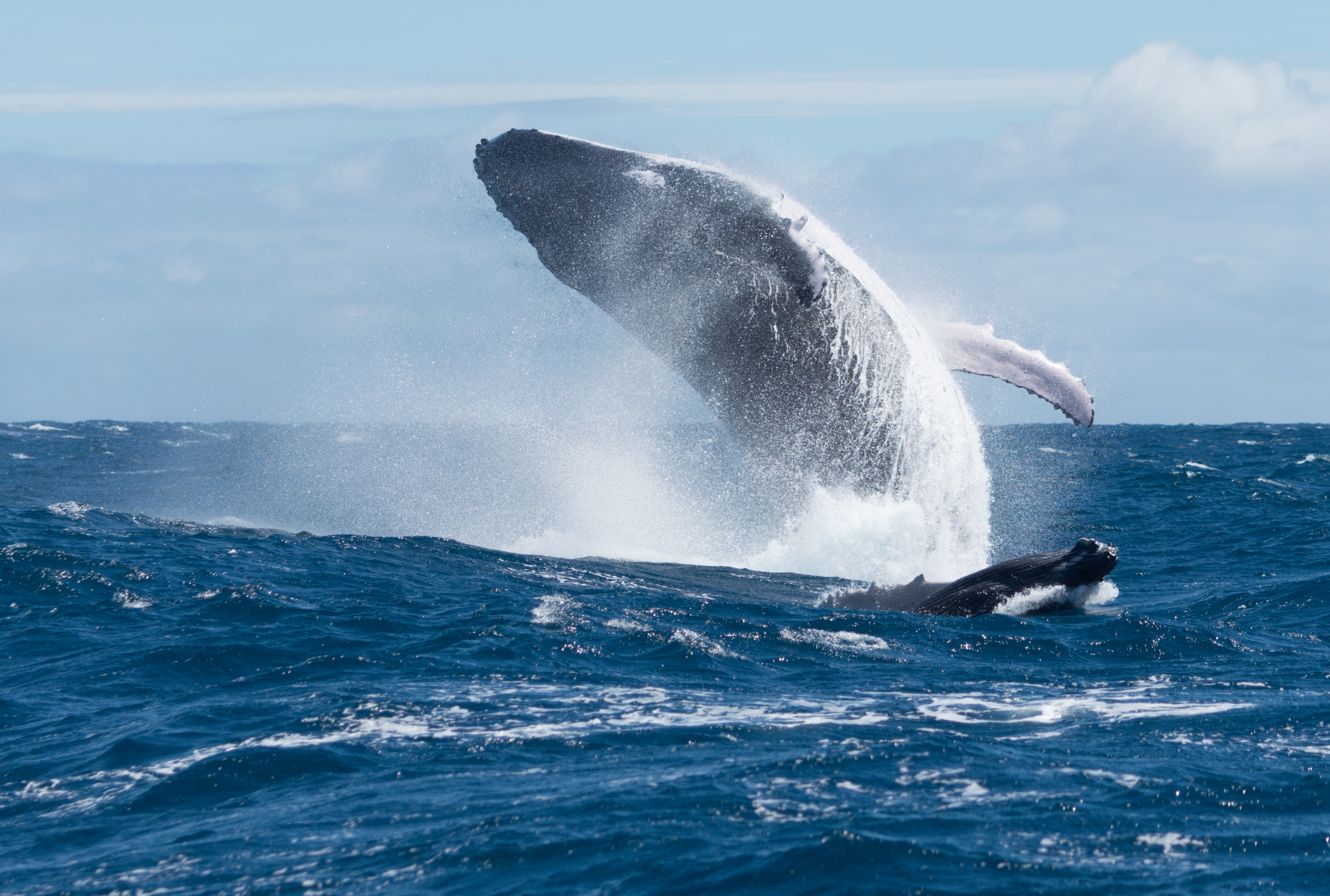
A humpback whale and its calf

Humpback whales (Megaptera novaeangliae) are capable of the production of complex songs. These songs are amongst some of the longest measured in animals. Only male humpback whales perform these vocalizations; it was initially hypothesized that these songs may be a part of the sexual selection process. This point however, is unclear. It has been found that males only began their song after joining a group where pairs of mother and calf were present. Although the reason behind this behaviour is uncertain, some have hypothesized that the songs produced by male humpback whales may be a part of escorting, or accompanying females. Singing can be a costly behaviour, because it can lead to more attention being drawn. In the humpback whales' situation, their singing can attract other competing males. Yet, the singing behaviour continues and therefore, it is assumed that the songs are critical to the courtship behaviour of the humpback whales.

=== Insects ===
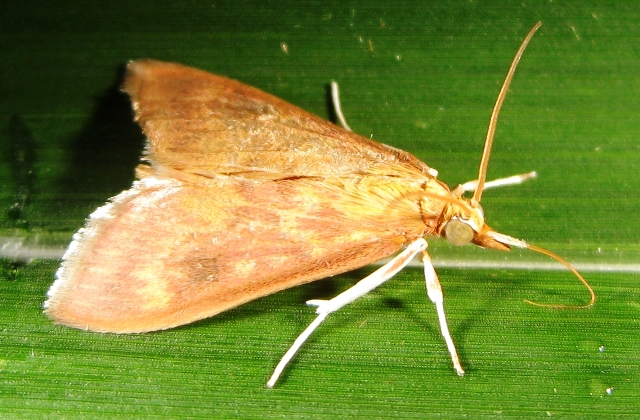
An Asian corn borer moth (Ostrinia furnacalis)

One potential barrier in the study of zoomusicology is that there are some forms of music produced by various animals that humans are incapable of hearing. This music is very low in amplitude and is known as quiet song, whisper communication, or soft song. This low amplitude music has been shown in birds, as well as insects and is linked to behaviour. Moth species have been shown to have developed the ability to communicate using ultrasonic sounds, and this ability has transferred over to their production of soft songs. In the Asian corn borer moth (Ostrinia furnacalis) males produce an ultrasonic soft song to initiate courtship behaviour. The song that the male produces is so quiet that the female must be within a range of three centimeters in order to hear the song. In hearing the song, the female stays in one place and is completely still; this allows the male to initiate mating behaviour. The reason that the female remains still is because the song sounds very similar to sounds that a bat would produce. The female therefore remains still in order to avoid potential predation. There is another added benefit to this soft song produced by the male Asian corn borer moth, and that is that the song is so quiet that it decreases the males' predation risk. Although these soft songs are far less well known to the general public, they are an important aspect of zoomusicology and the further understanding of animal behaviour.

== Auditory enrichment and therapeutic effects of music on animals ==
=== Cats ===
David Teie has created two albums of music for cats. Researchers Snowdon and Savage found that domestic cats that showed little interest in human music are more interested in and responsive to Teie's music that was composed with species-appropriate features relevant to cats. The authors of a clinical study of Teie's music for cats in veterinary physical examinations concluded that cat-specific music may benefit cats by decreasing the stress levels and increasing the quality of care in veterinary clinical settings. They found that tranquil behaviors can be achieved in a veterinary clinical setting with the introduction of cat-specific music.

=== Cows ===
In an unpublished study at the University of Leicester, Liam MacKenzie and Adrian North found that playing music for dairy cows had an effect on the amount of milk that they produced. Over a nine-week period, dairy cows were exposed to fast (> 120 BPM), slow (< 100 BPM), and no music. Music was played for the cows 12 hours a day from 5 AM to 5 PM. The study found that cows exposed to slow music, like R.E.M.'s "Everybody Hurts" or Beethoven's Pastoral Symphony, produced 3% more milk than cows that were exposed to fast music, like "Pumping on your Stereo" by Supergrass and "Size of a Cow" by Wonderstuff. Bovine milk production has long been thought to be affected by exposure to music. Some farmers expose their cows to music to aid in milk production.

=== Dogs ===
Decreased stress levels have been observed in kennelled dogs that were exposed to classical music, but rapid habituation was also observed. In a 2017 follow up study, kennelled dogs were exposed to five different genres of music including soft rock, Motown, pop, reggae, and classical in order to determine whether or not increased variety of music could reduce habituation. The study found the heart rate variability, which indicates a decreased stress level, was significantly higher when the dogs were played reggae and soft rock, but the other three genres had a similar but less pronounced effect. In addition, the dogs were much more likely to lie down rather than stand while the music was being played. The study suggested that the increased variety of music decreased habituation that was present when playing exclusively classical music, though the dogs responded best when exposed to reggae and soft rock.

== See also ==
- Animal communication
- Animal echolocation
- Bioacoustics
- Biomusic
- Biophony
- List of animal sounds
- Nora (cat)
- Soundscape ecology
- Vocal learning

== Bibliography ==
- Marcello Sorce Keller. "Zoomusicology", Janet Sturman (ed.) The SAGE Encyclopedia of Music and Culture. Los Angeles: SAGE Reference, 2019, Vol. V, 2411–2414.
- Marcello Sorce Keller,"Linnaeus, Zoomusicology, Ecomusicology, and the Quest for Meaningful Categories", Musicological Annual, Univerza v Ljubljai, Filozofska faculteta, LII(2016), no. 2, 163–176.
- Marcello Sorce Keller, "Zoomusicology and Ethnomusicology: A Marriage to Celebrate in Heaven." Yearbook for Traditional Music. XLIV(2012), 166–183.
