= Leash Law =

American power metal band

- Origin: Tampa, Florida, U.S.
- Genres: Heavy metal, power metal
- Years active: 2003–2005
- Labels: The End, Black Lotus
- Members: Wade Black; Rick Renstrom; Emo Mowery; Stephen Elder; Richard Christy

Leash Law was an American power metal band formed by ex-members of various other groups. It was formed in 2003 by Wade Black, once a member of the band Seven Witches, Rick Renstrom, Emo Mowery, Stephen Elder, and Richard Christy, who was once a member of the influential bands Death and Iced Earth and has since become famous as the replacement of Stuttering John on The Howard Stern Show. In 2004, Leash Law released their first and only album, Dogface. The band disbanded in 2005.

== Members ==
- Wade Black – lead vocals
- Rick Renstrom – guitar
- Ed "Emo" Mowery – guitar/keyboards/death vocals
- Stephen Elder – bass
- Richard Christy – drums

== Discography ==
Dogface

Studio album by Leash Law
- Released: 2004
- Genre: Heavy metal, power metal
- Length: 40:13
- Label: Black Lotus

Professional ratings
Review scores
Source	Rating
AllMusic	2.5/5 stars

=== Dogface (2004) ===
1. "Fight" (Black, Renstrom) – 4:26
2. "Dogface" (Mowery) – 4:39
3. "Stealing Grace" (Black, Renstrom) – 4:41
4. "Hail to Blood" (Black, Christy, Mowery, Renstrom) – 5:24
5. "Banion" (Black, Renstrom) – 4:11
6. "Better When Betrayed" (Black, Mowery, Renstrom) – 4:24
7. "Martial Law" (Black, Renstrom) – 4:19
8. "Hellhole" (Black, Christy, Mowery, Renstrom) – 5:03
9. "Paving the Way" (Christy) – 3:26
