= Richard Roeper =

American writer and film critic (born 1959)

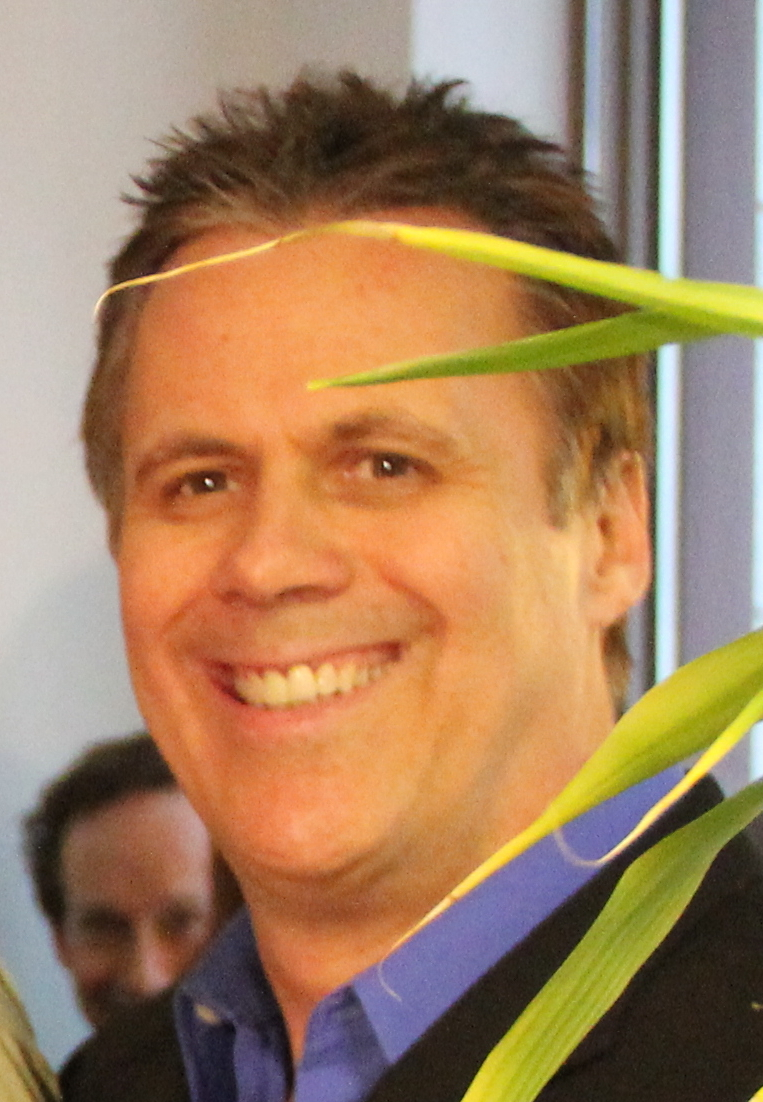
- Roeper in 2011
- Born: Richard E. Roeper; October 17, 1959 (age 67); Chicago, Illinois, U.S.
- Education: Illinois State University
- Occupation: Columnist
- Writing career
- Subject: Film criticism
- Website: chicago.suntimes.com/richard-roeper

Richard E. Roeper (born October 17, 1959) is an American writer. He is a former columnist and film critic for the Chicago Sun-Times, where he wrote for 39 years dating back to 1986 until his departure in 2025. He co-hosted the television series At the Movies with Roger Ebert from 2000 to 2008, serving as the late Gene Siskel's successor. From 2010 to 2014, he co-hosted The Roe and Roeper Show with Roe Conn on WLS-AM. From October 2015 to October 2017, Roeper served as the host of the FOX 32 morning show Good Day Chicago. From 2021 to 2025, he has hosted a podcast entitled The Richard Roeper Show for American Eagle. He was a regular contributor to Windy City Weekend and its predecessor Windy City Live on WLS-TV from 2018 to 2026. In 2025, Roeper joined RogerEbert.com as a regular contributor and began co-hosting The Movie of Your Life podcast. In 2026, he became a regular contributor to WMAQ-TV.

== Early life ==
Roeper was born on October 17, 1959 in Chicago, Illinois. He is one of four children to Robert and Margaret (née Slobatec) Roeper. He grew up in south suburban Dolton, Illinois area. Roeper attended Thornridge High School before graduating from Illinois State University in 1982 with a bachelor's degree in journalism. While still a student at the university, he auditioned for the movie review program Sneak Previews when Gene Siskel and Roger Ebert (his future co-host on At the Movies) left the program, for which he was turned down.

== Career ==
Roeper joined the Chicago Sun-Times as an editorial assistant in 1986. He then worked as a reporter before becoming a columnist for the paper in 1988. The topics of his columns ranged from politics to media to entertainment. He has been voted the best columnist in Illinois by the Associated Press on numerous occasions.

He has also written seven books on topics ranging from movies to urban legends to conspiracy theories to the Chicago White Sox. In 2009, Roeper appeared on Howard Stern's show and said he had written a book on gambling, entitled Bet the House, which was released in the first quarter of 2010.

Roeper was a radio host on WLS AM 890 in Chicago. He also hosted shows on WLUP-FM, WLS-FM, and WMVP-AM in Chicago. In the early 2000s, he was the film critic for CBS in Chicago for three years.

His columns have been syndicated by The New York Times to worldwide publications. Roeper has written for a number of magazines, including Esquire, Spy, TV Guide, Playboy, Maxim, and Entertainment Weekly. In 2001, he was named one of People magazine's most eligible bachelors.

Roeper has been a frequent guest on The Tonight Show, Live with Regis and Kelly, The O'Reilly Factor, and countless other national programs. He also hosted Starz Inside, a monthly documentary series that aired on the Starz network. Roeper appeared on the first episode of the fifth season of Entourage, where he reviewed a fake movie titled Medellin with Michael Phillips on At the Movies. In April 2008, Roeper was the central figure on an episode of Top Chef, where contestants served up movie-themed dishes to Roeper and his friends (including Aisha Tyler).

In February 2009, Roeper launched his website, which features movie reviews, blog entries, photos, and Twitter posts. In December 2009, he launched a video section that featured on-camera reviews of movies. The video segments were originally produced in partnership with the Starz premium cable channel. Roeper announced that the reviews would appear first on his site, then on the Starz channel.

In December 2009, it was reported that Roeper had signed with ReelzChannel to be a regular contributor. Beginning in December 2010, Roeper began producing video reviews for ReelzChannel. He stopped reviewing movies for ReelzChannel in February 2015; his final review was for the Jude Law disaster film Black Sea.

From April 12, 2010, to October 7, 2014, he co-hosted The Roe & Roeper Show with Roe Conn on Chicago's WLS 890 radio station from 2-6 pm CST.

In October 2015, Roeper joined the cast of the Fox Chicago morning TV show Good Day Chicago. He signed off from that morning TV show on October 18, 2017. From 2018 until 2021, he was a contributor to Windy City Live and from 2021 to 2026, a contributor to its predecessor, Windy City Weekend, for WLS-TV. In April 2026, Roeper joined WMAQ-TV as a regular contributor.

Roeper was suspended from the Sun-Times on January 29, 2018, pending an investigation into allegations that he had purchased Twitter followers. On February 2, the Sun-Times released a statement stating that their investigation did find that Roeper purchased over 25,000 fake followers. The paper later reinstated him, though he was required to begin using a new account on which he was explicitly disallowed from buying followers.

In November 2025, Roeper appeared in a commercial for the restaurant Mr. Submarine during its 50th anniversary ad campaign, reviewing one of the subs as part of a series of ads featuring various Chicago notables.

=== Film critic ===
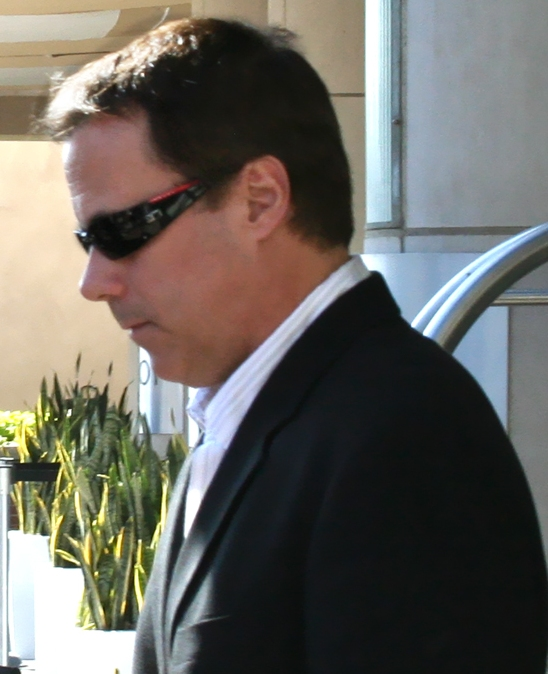
Roeper at the 2006 Toronto International Film Festival

After Gene Siskel of Siskel & Ebert died on February 20, 1999, Roger Ebert co-hosted the show with nearly 30 guest critics. After ten appearances on the program, Roeper was offered the opportunity to co-host the popular film review show with Ebert permanently. The series was renamed Ebert & Roeper and the Movies in 2000. The title was shortened to Ebert & Roeper in 2001. Before this, he conducted an interview in 1995 with Siskel and Ebert to commemorate the 20th anniversary of their partnership.

Beginning in August 2006, while his co-host Roger Ebert was recovering from cancer surgery, Roeper was joined by numerous guest critics, including Clerks director Kevin Smith, The Tonight Show host Jay Leno, and singer-songwriter John Mellencamp. On Sunday, July 20, 2008, Roeper announced that he was leaving the show in mid-August and would return with a new show later in the year. However, plans for a new program starring Roeper failed to materialize.

Between 2009 and late 2010, Roeper contributed video reviews to Starz. In December 2010, he moved to ReelzChannel, where he contributed a segment titled Richard Roeper's Reviews every weekday at 5:00 pm ET. Roeper remained with the network until early 2015. In early 2013, Roeper began contributing film reviews to RogerEbert.com. On September 12, 2013, it was announced that Roeper would replace Roger Ebert as the main movie critic for the Chicago Sun-Times after his death on April 4, 2013, at the age of 70. In August 2014, Roeper became first-string film critic for the Chicago Sun-Times, where he made his debut reviewing Guardians of the Galaxy. He is a member of Chicago Film Critics Association.

In 2021, he began hosting a podcast entitled The Richard Roeper Show (formerly Screen Time with Roe and Roeper which he hosted with Roe Conn until 2022) for American Eagle, which aired every Tuesday and Thursday. The podcast ended in December of 2025.

On March 19, 2025, Roeper revealed that he accepted a buyout from the Sun-Times to terminate his employment, ending his time at the newspaper after a 39-year run. Despite this, he is expected to keep reviewing movies on his podcast and for Windy City Weekend on WLS-TV. Roeper's last review for the Sun-Times, published on March 20, 2025, was for Snow White.

In 2025, Roeper became a regular contributor to RogerEbert.com. Later that same year in October, he began co-hosting the podcast The Movie of Your Life alongside journalist Jenniffer Weigel exploring the connections between life experiences and films.

== Preferences ==
=== Favorites ===
Roeper has cited The Maltese Falcon, The Godfather trilogy, and Ferris Bueller's Day Off as among his favorite films. On Ferris Bueller's Day Off he stated that, "It has one of the highest 'repeatability' factors of any film I've ever seen...I can watch it again and again. There's also this, and I say in all sincerity: Ferris Bueller's Day Off is something of a suicide prevention film or, at the very least, a story about a young man trying to help his friend gain some measure of self-worth...Ferris has made it his mission to show Cameron that the whole world in front of him is passing him by and that life can be pretty sweet if you wake up and embrace it. That's the lasting message of Ferris Bueller's Day Off." Roeper pays homage to the film with a license plate that says "SVFRRIS".

In a 2000 interview, he cited Woody Allen as a hero of filmmaking. Among his favorite films from the 1990s are Goodfellas, Pulp Fiction, Heat, Good Will Hunting, and Notting Hill. In November 2004, on a special segment of Ebert & Roeper, Roeper stated that his all-time favorite film about Thanksgiving is Planes, Trains and Automobiles.

=== Best films of the year ===
Since 2000, Roeper has compiled an annual film list which provides an overview of his critical preferences.

- 2000: Crouching Tiger, Hidden Dragon
- 2001: Memento
- 2002: Gangs of New York
- 2003: In America
- 2004: Hotel Rwanda
- 2005: Syriana
- 2006: The Departed
- 2007: Michael Clayton
- 2008: Slumdog Millionaire
- 2009: Brothers
- 2010: Inception
- 2011: Drive
- 2012: Zero Dark Thirty
- 2013: American Hustle
- 2014: Boyhood
- 2015: Room
- 2016: Manchester by the Sea
- 2017: Three Billboards Outside Ebbing, Missouri
- 2018: Widows
- 2019: The Irishman
- 2020: Nomadland
- 2021: Belfast
- 2022: The Whale
- 2023: Oppenheimer
- 2024: Small Things Like These
- 2025: Sinners

== Work ==
=== Filmography ===
==== Film ====
| Year | Title | Role | Notes |
|---|---|---|---|
| 2003 | Sex at 24 Frames Per Second | Interviewee | |
| 2004 | 101 Biggest Celebrity Oops | Himself | |
| 2004 | 101 Most Unforgettable SNL Moments | Himself | |
| 2004 | Retrosexual: The 80's | Himself | |
| 2004 | Non-Denominational All-Star Celebrity Holiday Special | Himself | |
| 2006 | Supertwink | Himself | Uncredited |
| 2006 | 2006 Independent Spirit Awards | Audience Member | |
| 2007 | Heckler | Himself | |
| 2008 | An Evening at the Academy Awards | Co-Host | |
| 2009 | This Is Our Moment: Election Night 2008 | Commentator | |
| 2009 | Don't You Forget About Me | Himself | |
| 2009 | Clarkworld | Himself | |
| 2013 | The Fire Rises: The Creation and Impact of the Dark Knight Trilogy | Himself | |
| 2014 | Madzilla! | Himself | |
| 2018 | The Bachelor Party: The Bachelor Parody - The Playboy's Impossible Mission | Himself | |
| 2020 | Skin: A History of Nudity in the Movies | Himself | |
| 2023 | Tom Cruise: The Last Movie Star | Himself | |

==== Television ====
| Year | Title | Role | Notes |
|---|---|---|---|
| 2000–2008 | At the Movies | Host/Guest Host | 413 episodes |
| 2000; 2006 | Chicago Tonight | Himself | 2 episodes |
| 2000 | Late Night with Conan O'Brien | Guest | Episode: "Roger Ebert & Richard Roeper/Bernie Mac/Tara MacLean" |
| 2000 | Charlie Rose | Guest | 1 episode |
| 2001–2013 | The Tonight Show with Jay Leno | Guest | 23 episodes |
| 2001 | The Daily Show | Himself | 1 episode |
| 2003–2008 | E! True Hollywood Story | Himself | 4 episodes |
| 2004 | Jimmy Kimmel Live! | Himself | 1 episode |
| 2005 | Dennis Miller | Himself | 1 episode |
| 2005 | The Factor | Himself | 1 episode |
| 2005 | The Tony Danza Show | Himself | 3 episodes |
| 2006 | The Top 5 Reasons You Can't Blame... | Himself | Episode: "Bob Knight for his repeated outbursts" |
| 2006 | Howard Stern On Demand | Judge | Episode: "The Howard Stern Film Festival" |
| 2007–2008 | Live with Regis and Kelly | Himself | 2 episodes |
| 2008 | Top Chef | Guest Judge | Episode: "Film Food" |
| 2008 | Entourage | Himself | Episode: "Fantasy Island" |
| 2009–2010 | Richard Roeper & the Movies | Himself | 85 episodes |
| 2009 | The Hour | Himself | 1 episode |
| 2009 | The Jay Leno Show | Himself | 1 episode |
| 2010–2011 | ReelzChannel Spotlight | Host | 5 episodes |
| 2010–2011 | Hollywood's Top Ten | Reelz Channel Movie Reviewer | 9 episodes |
| 2010 | Richard Roeper's Reviews | Himself | 5 episodes |
| 2010 | Prime 9 | Himself | 2 episodes |
| 2011–2013 | ReelzChannel Specials | Himself | 3 episodes |
| 2015–2017 | Poker Night in America | Himself | 17 episodes |
| 2015–2018 | Roeper's Reviews | Himself | 162 episodes |
| 2016 | The Timeline | Himself | Episode: "The Fog Bowl" |
| 2025 | Chicago Stories | Himself | Episode: "Marshall Field's" |

=== Bibliography ===
- He Rents, She Rents: The Ultimate Guide to the Best Women's Films and Guy Movies, with Laurie Viera (1999)
- Hollywood Urban Legends: The Truth Behind All Those Delightfully Persistent Myths of Films, Television, and Music (2001)
- Urban Legends: The Truth Behind All Those Deliciously Entertaining Myths That Are Absolutely, Positively, 100% Not True (2001)
- Ten Sure Signs a Movie Character Is Doomed, and Other Surprising Movie Lists (2003)
- Schlock Value: Hollywood At Its Worst (2005)
- Sox and the City: A Fan's Love Affair with the White Sox from the Heartbreak of '67 to the Wizards of Oz (2006)
- Debunked!: Conspiracy Theories, Urban Legends, and Evil Plots of the 21st Century (2008)
- Bet the House: How I Gambled Over a Grand a Day for 30 Days on Sports, Poker, and Games of Chance (2010)

== Accolades ==
In 1992, he was awarded the National Headliner Award as the top newspaper columnist in the country. He won two Chicago / Midwest Emmy Awards for his news commentaries on Fox. On April 11, 2020, Roeper was awarded the Roger Ebert Award at the 2020 AAFCA Special Achievement Award Luncheon.
