= Steve Tittle =

Canadian composer and music educator (1935–2024)

John Stephen Tittle (20 May 1935 – 25 September 2024) was a Canadian composer and music educator.

== Biography ==
Tittle was born in Willard, Ohio on 20 May 1935. He studied composition at Kent State University with Harold Miles, John White and Fred Coulter, and at University of Wisconsin–Madison with Hilmar Luckhardt, Robert Crane and Burt Levy. He was a school music teacher 1962–65 in Ohio, and his early performance experience was as a trumpet player in US Navy bands (including the USS Iowa BB-61 ship's band) and in ensembles in Ohio and Wisconsin.

In 1970 he joined the faculty of Dalhousie University, where until 1994 he was associate professor of composition and theory. Founder and co-designer of the Dalhousie Experimental-Electronic Sound Studio, he also inaugurated an improvisation ensemble, Murphy's Law ensemble, which has evolved into the new music ensemble. He was a 1971 charter member, secretary and artistic director (1981–6) of NOVA MUSIC("inNOVAtions in MUSIC", an ensemble which preceded Murphy's Law by two years) and in 1989, together with several other Halifax professional musicians, created its successor, Upstream. In these enterprises, and in numerous solo and ensemble appearances in the city, as conductor, organizer, trumpet and flügelhorn player, and mallet percussionist, he was a catalyst for new music performance life in the Maritimes, in particular introducing the potential of synthesizer and tape composition to the region. Tittle performed with other noted composers and musicians, including Philip Glass and Allen Ginsberg. He was a charter member of the Atlantic Canadian Composers Association and producer of its chamber music recording. Tittle was also a member of SOCAN and the Canadian League of Composers. After retiring from teaching, he lived in Nelson, B.C, and died in 2024.

Tittle was a composer, primarily in smaller forms. Drawing on influences from jazz, minimalist, and non-Western music. His works such as orange-blossom book, it is all there all the time, where there is no other (only we), let it shine all the time, messages (four), and what finally matters most is grace, are poised between Western and Asian aesthetics: an impression of timelessness and of the mobile tend to disguise tight control of material and logical, dynamic conclusions. The interplay between tape and performer in innocence and natural right, salvation dharma band, and only/other/always achieves a linear unity.

Tittle was commissioned by the Atlantic Symphony Orchestra and Symphony Nova Scotia, Music Gallery New Music Concerts, CBC Radio, the Canadian Electronic Ensemble, the Kronos Quartet, Lawrence Cherney, Rivka Golani, Philippe Djokic, the Atlantic Camera Trio, the Karr-Lewis Duo, Scotia Festival, Technical University of Nova Scotia, and Dalhousie University. He also wrote for CBC Radio drama, the NFB, and the Nova Scotia Communications and Information Centre. He recorded one album on Nerve Records, (one of the) merely players. He was an associate of the Canadian Music Centre.

Tittle also recorded music for several films, including Farmers Helping Farmers (1987), In Love and Anger: Milton Acorn - Poet (1984), My Urban Garden (1984), Miller Brittain (1981), and The Ross Family Mystery (1980).

Tittle died on 25 September 2024, at the age of 89.
