= Promise (Massacre album) =

Studio album by Massacre
- Released: July 23, 1996
- Recorded: 1994
- Studio: Wolf Head's Studio
- Genres: Groove metal, death metal
- Length: 48:30
- Label: Earache
- Producers: Andrew Morris; Pete Sison; Syrus Peters; Rick Rozz

Massacre chronology
Inhuman Condition (1992)	Promise (1996)	Back from Beyond (2014)

Promise is the second studio album by American death metal band Massacre, released on July 23, 1996, through Earache Records. Massacre vocalist Kam Lee rejoined the band in 1993 after leaving for a year during a tour in the United Kingdom when guitarist Rick Rozz approached him for a new album to record. Rozz wanted Lee to write a different type of lyrics and Rozz wrote the rest of the album. Lee wrote the lyrics and he recorded the vocals, but left Massacre during post-production due to dissatisfaction with the album. Lee said that the vocals are not his and he is wrongfully credited as the vocalist, and that an unknown person finished the vocals. After Lee left the band, Kenny Goodwin replaced him as the temporary vocalist and guitarist for Massacre.

Promise shows the band abandoning the death metal genre temporarily for a groove metal style resembling Pantera, and the lyrics are cathartic lyrics about relationship issues. Promise was widely disliked by fans, and Lee disowned the album. Lee quit music for a decade due to his dissatisfaction with Promise and his concern that death metal would begin to sound like the album. Promise was recorded in 1994, but took two more years to complete due to Lee leaving the band during post-production. Massacre performed a few shows with Goodwin to promote Promise after Lee left, but was booed by fans.

Due to this fan backlash and Promise's lack of success, Massacre broke up quickly after releasing the album.

== Musical style and lyrics ==
The album features a temporary departure from the band's death metal sound and instead features a groove metal style resembling Pantera. In contrast to the gory lyrics of the debut album From Beyond, the lyrics on Promise are often cathartic and are about relationships, and the vocals emphasize shouting over growls. Promise features a cover of Concrete Blonde's "Bloodletting" featuring a female vocalist named Christine Whitten.

== Background, recording and writing ==
Kam Lee, the vocalist for Massacre, says that he did not write the album. Lee left Massacre in 1992 on the last date of their tour in the United Kingdom. In 1993, he was approached by guitarist Rick Rozz about rejoining for another album. Lee says Rozz wrote the album and aimed for a "pseudo-Pantera meets Type O Negative type of band". Lee was asked to perform vocals for the album, and he did. Lee hated the album and quit during post-production. Lee says in interviews that the vocals that made it on the album are not his and that an unknown person finished the vocals. Lee says the band tried performing shows with the new vocalist but got booed by fans. Before Massacre broke up almost instantly after releasing Promise, Kenny Goodwin replaced Lee as the temporary vocalist and guitarist for Massacre after Lee left the band during post-production of the album in 1994. Promise was recorded in 1994, but it took Rozz and Earache Records two more years to complete the album because Lee quit the band again a year prior. Lee says that Earache Records wrongfully credited him for the vocals and that after leaving the band, someone else recorded the vocals on the album: "Do not let them fool you! All the vocals on this album are not me! I never finished all the vocal tracks! This album sucks, and it ruined my career for a time! I hate it, and hope that every copy burst into flames of hellfire at this very moment!" Lee says Rozz wrote most of the album, but Lee wrote the lyrics. Lee says Rozz did not want to write death metal and, therefore, wanted Lee to change his lyrics about blood and gore. Lee was reluctant but agreed, and wrote the lyrics in just three days: "I wrote the lyrics for that album in three days, and I wasn't ever happy with the results... and even some lines were made up on the fly. It was just something I was not into doing, and I felt it was shit!"

== Reception ==
Promise was widely hated by fans, and Greg Pratt of heavy metal magazine Decibel retrospectively reviewed the album in 2021, writing:

I’m not saying this album’s great; I’m barely saying it’s good. Actually, parts of it suck and, contextually, it’s a total nightmare. I don’t really get any enjoyment out of listening to it. It’s not fun to spin. ... Then we can spin a song or two from Promise one last time and acknowledge that it has its moments, then file it away, (hopefully) forgiven and (thankfully) forgotten.

Lee disowned Promise and says he hates the album. He worried death metal was going to change into what Promise sounded like and quit death metal for ten years because of how much he hated Promise. Massacre tried to perform a few shows with Goodwin as the new vocalist to promote Promise, but got booed by fans. Due to fan backlash and the Promise's lack of success, Massacre broke up quickly after releasing the album.

== Track listing ==
No.	Title	Length
1.	"Nothing"	4:55
2.	"Forever Torn"	4:24
3.	"Black Soil Nest"	4:52
4.	"Promise"	4:19
5.	"Bitter End"	3:58
6.	"Bloodletting" (Concrete Blonde cover)	5:39
7.	"Unnameable"	4:06
8.	"Where Dwells Sadness"	6:16
9.	"Suffering"	4:32
10.	"Inner Demon"	5:29

== Personnel ==
Adapted from the album's liner notes.

Massacre

- Kam Lee: vocals, guitar, lyrics (Note: Lee was credited as the vocalist by Earache Records, but he said he left during post-production and that the vocals are not his. Lee said he only wrote the lyrics and that an unknown person finished the vocals.)
- Kenny Goodwin: guitar, vocals (Note: Goodwin joined the band after Lee left, replacing him. Goodwin became the guitarist and vocalist for Massacre temporarily, but Lee insists the vocals on Promise are not his and that a person he does not know the name of replaced him.)
- Rick Rozz: guitar, writing
- Syrus Peters: drums
- Pete Sison: bass

Additional personnel

- Christine Whitten: guest vocals on "Bloodletting"

Technical personnel

- Andrew Morris: producer, mixing
- Dana Cornock: engineering
