= Pull the Plug =

Pull the Plug may refer to:

- Pull the Plug (London Elektricity album), 1998
- Pull the Plug, an album by The Huntingtons, 2005
- "Pull the Plug", a song by Death from the album Leprosy, 1988
- "Pull the Plug", a song by Starz from the album Starz, 1976

== See also ==
- Life support
