= Bill Andrews (drummer) =

American drummer

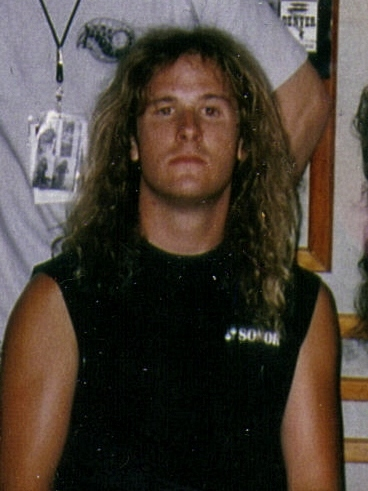
- Andrews with Death in 1989

Background information
- Genres: Death metal
- Occupation: Drummer
- Formerly of: Death, Massacre

Bill Andrews is an American drummer. He is best known for his work with Death and Massacre.

== Biography ==
He and guitarist Allen West started Massacre in 1984. The band played heavy metal at the time and shifted to death metal once Kam Lee joined. Andrews joined Death in 1987 alongside Massacre bandmates Rick Rozz and Terry Butler.

Andrews has lived in Japan since "the early 1990s". According to former Death bassist Butler, Andrews had planned to participate in the December 2021 Chuck Schuldiner tribute concerts that were to be held in Florida, but was unable to travel as a result of passport renewal backlogs in Japan.

== Discography ==
- Death – Leprosy (1988)
- Death – Spiritual Healing (1990)
- Massacre – From Beyond (1991)
- Massacre – Inhuman Condition EP (1992)
