= Scenes from Hell =

Studio album by Sigh
- Released: 19 January 2010
- Recorded: April 2009
- Genre: Black metal, avant-garde metal
- Length: 43:06
- Label: The End

Sigh chronology
Hangman's Hymn (2007)	Scenes from Hell (2010)	In Somniphobia (2012)

Professional ratings
Review scores
Source	Rating
Allmusic	link
Metal Hammer	8/10 stars
Exclaim!	mixed
Thrash Hits	1.5/6 link

Scenes from Hell is the eighth full-length studio album by the Japanese extreme metal band Sigh. It is the band's first full-length recording to feature Dr. Mikannibal. On October 15, 2009 the band posted the album cover and set January 19, 2010 as the official release date.

A music video was released for the song "Prelude to the Oracle".

== Track listing ==
All tracks are written by Mirai Kawashima.

No.	Title	Length
1.	"Prelude to the Oracle"	4:10
2.	"L’art de Mourir"	4:55
3.	"The Soul Grave"	3:59
4.	"The Red Funeral"	6:54
5.	"The Summer Funeral"	7:06
6.	"Musica in Tempora Belli"	5:59
7.	"Vanitas"	6:24
8.	"Scenes from Hell"	3:35
Total length:		43:06

== Personnel ==
Sigh

- Mirai Kawashima – vocals, orchestrations, piano, organ, theremin, whistle, sitar, tabla, tampura
- Dr. Mikannibal – vocals, alto saxophone, tenor saxophone, baritone saxophone
- Satoshi Fujinami – bass, rambourine, vibraslap, percussion
- Shinichi Ishikawa – guitar
- Junichi Harashima – drums

Additional musician

- David Tibet – spoken word ("The Red Funeral", "Musica In Tempora Belli")
- Kam Lee – additional vocals ("L'art de Mourir")
- Koichi Koike – cello
- Adam Matlock – clarinet, bass clarinet, accordion
- Catherine Williams – flute, piccolo flute
- Ashlee Pahmiyer – French horn
- Erin McGowan-Slee – oboe
- Greg Cossar, Hideto Nagai, Zoltán Pál – trombone
- Jonathan Fisher – trumpet
- Kazuki Ookubo – tuba, euphonium
- Kyosuke Matsumoto – viola
- Tatsuaki Takayama, Takatoshi Yanase – violin

Technical personnel

- Naoaki Kose – engineering
- James Murphy – mastering
- Eliran Kantor – artwork
