= Leprosy (disambiguation) =

Leprosy is a disease. Leprosy may also refer to:

- Leprosy (album), an album by the death metal band Death
- Tzaraath, a condition referred to in the Book of Leviticus translated as "leprosy" in English Bibles

== See also ==
- Ieper, the Flemish name for Ypres in Belgium
- Leprous, Norwegian progressive metal band
