= Gallows Gallery =

Studio album by Sigh
- Released: December 13, 2005
- Recorded: August 2004 – July 2005
- Genre: Avant-garde metal
- Length: 45:41
- Label: Candlelight; The End (reissue)
- Producer: Sigh

Sigh chronology
Imaginary Sonicscape (2001)	Gallows Gallery (2005)	Hangman's Hymn (2007)

Professional ratings
Review scores
Source	Rating
Allmusic	2.5/5 stars
Terrorizer	8.5/10

Gallows Gallery is an album by the band Sigh. It was released by Candlelight Records originally in 2005.

== Background ==
Gallows Gallery is Sigh's first album as a four-piece rather than a trio and their first album for which they made a music video. The album also more prominently features clean vocals, with Mirai's singing heavily processed through Pro Tools and vocoders. Sigh incorporated influences that prompted Avi Pitchon to describe the album in Terrorizer as containing a "decidedly power fuckin' metal vibe...it's power metal the Sigh way". Pitchon went on to suggest that "one thing Gallows Gallery surely isn't is black metal".

In response to suggestions that Gallows Gallery and the preceding Imaginary Sonicscape sounded more "happy" than previous Sigh albums, Mirai responded that:

Some people say that our late stuff sounds happy, but I have never ever had the intention to express happy feelings in any way. My motivation as a musician is always negative things. I can't write any happy songs, probably because I am a negative person to the bone...I know Gallows Gallery and Imaginary Sonicscape contain some different feelings, but still they are all based on my negative feelings. I just use other techniques to express it, like using even major keys.

Mirai also confirmed that, while the album is not a concept album, "musically each song is connected with the same or similar chord progressions and melodies", producing what he described as "a certain continuity".

The untitled Track 10 was purported to be a recording of sounds researched in sonic warfare, created to psychologically harm the listener. It was also rumored that the inclusion of this track was what caused the band to be dropped from the Century Media label; however, both of these rumors have been refuted by the band. These rumors were created in part to hide the poor mastering of the original release, and in part to hide the real reason why they were dropped from Century Media, which was that the label was disappointed that the band did not go in a more black metal-oriented direction.

In 2007, The End Records released a remastered reissue of the album, with revamped blue-sky artwork and extra tracks. The minute-long intro to "Confession to Be Buried" was removed from the remastered version, bringing the track's length down to 5:25.

The album was remastered again in 2012 by Blood Music, who released the album in limited double CD and double vinyl editions. The second disc contained previously unreleased demo recordings; additionally, the untitled tenth track and the David Harrow mix of "The Tranquilizer Song" were omitted from the remaster.

== Track listing ==
- All Songs Written by Sigh, except where noted.

No.	Title	Length
1.	"Pale Monument"	3:50
2.	"In a Drowse"	3:24
3.	"The Enlightenment Day"	3:31
4.	"Confession to Be Buried"	5:25
5.	"The Tranquilizer Song" (Kawashima)	3:18
6.	"Midnight Sun"	3:44
7.	"Silver Universe"	3:50
8.	"Gavotte Grim"	7:25
9.	"Messiahplan"	4:47
10.	"-"	1:12
11.	"The Tranquilizer Song (David Harrow Mix)"	4:03

=== 2007 Reissue Bonus Tracks ===
12. Pale Monument (Harsh Vocal Version) - 3:53
13. In a Drowse (Demo 2003) - 3:41
14. Messiahplan (Gunface Alternate Guitar Solo Take) - 3:48
15. The Tranquilizer Song (David Harrow Remix Outtake) - 4:04
16. Jazzy Outtake 1 - 0:32
17. Jazzy Outtake 2 - 0:31

=== 2012 Reissue Bonus Disc - Demos, September 20, 2004 ===
1. In a Drowse - 3:25
2. Silver Universe - 3:49
3. Confession to Be Buried - 4:00
4. The Tranquilizer Song - 3:21
5. The Enlightenment Day - 3:29
6. Pale Monument - 3:52
7. Gavotte Grim - 7:02
8. Messiahplan - 3:49

== Personnel ==
=== Sigh ===
- Mirai Kawashima: Vocals, Organ, MiniMoog, Prophet-5 & DX-7 Synthesizers, Fender Rhodes, Clavinet, Sampling, Glockenspiel, Gong, Bells, Sitar, Tabla
- Shinichi Ishikawa: Rhythm & Lead Guitars
- Satoshi Fujinami: Bass, Additional Guitars
- Junichi Harashima: Drums, Percussion, Brushes

=== Additional Personnel ===
- Paul Groundwell, Gus G.: Additional Lead Guitars
- Niklas Sundin - guitar solo on "In a Drowse"
- Bruce Lamont (from jazz metal band Yakuza): Saxophone
- Killjoy (from Necrophagia): Narration & Additional Vocals
