= Scenario IV: Dread Dreams =

Studio album by Sigh
- Released: 1999
- Genre: Avant-garde metal, black metal
- Length: 53:03
- Label: Cacophonous

Sigh chronology
Hail Horror Hail (1997)	Scenario IV: Dread Dreams (1999)	Imaginary Sonicscape (2001)

Professional ratings
Review scores
Source	Rating
Allmusic	4/5 stars
Exclaim!	(favorable)

Scenario IV: Dread Dreams is the fourth full-length album by the band Sigh. It was released by Cacophonous Records originally in 1999.

This album shows the traits of Sigh continuing to explore their more well known avant-garde, experimental sound. An example would be on "Black Curse" where Sigh have a standard black metal sound that eventually part way through turns into a mild funk riff and a country guitar sound. Sigh would expand on this type of experimental sound on the album Imaginary Sonicscape.

This was their last album for the Cacophonous label. Their next album appeared on Century Media.

== Track listing ==
- All music by Sigh, except where noted. Lyrics by Mirai, except where noted.

No.	Title	Length
1.	"Diabolic Suicide"	7:31
2.	"Infernal Cries" (Damian, Mirai)	4:35
3.	"Black Curse" (Lyrics by Taiki of the band Devil, with English translation by Mirai)	8:22
4.	"Iconoclasm in the 4th Desert"	7:30
5.	"In the Mind of a Lunatic" (King)	4:34
6.	"Severed Ways" (Killjoy)	8:05
7.	"Imprisoned" (Damian)	5:17
8.	"Waltz: Dread Dreams" (Music by Mirai)	1:22
9.	"Divine Graveyard"	5:47
Total length:		53:03

== Personnel ==
- Mirai: Vocals, Keyboard, Bass, Sampling, Programming, Vocoder
- Shinichi: Acoustic & Electric Guitar
- Satoshi: Drums, Percussion
- Chie Kouno: Female chorus on tracks 1, 2 and 5
- Damian: Chorus on tracks 4,7 and 8
