= Imaginary Sonicscape =

Studio album by Sigh
- Released: July 4, 2001
- Recorded: Sep 2000 – Mar 2001
- Genres: Avant-garde metal, black metal
- Length: 63:32 (original); 77:52 (remaster)
- Labels: Century Media; JVC Victor (Japan only)
- Producer: Sigh

Sigh chronology
Scenario IV: Dread Dreams (1999)	Imaginary Sonicscape (2001)	Gallows Gallery (2005)

Imaginary Sonicscape is the fifth studio album by Japanese black metal band Sigh, released on July 4, 2001. Produced by Sigh, it was the band's first record released on Century Media Records. The musical styles of Imaginary Sonicscape further explored the experimental tendencies of the band's previous album Scenario IV: Dread Dreams with further psychedelic elements to the band's sound.

== Production ==
After leaving their previous record label Cacophonous Records for Century Media due to lack of promotion, Sigh entered the studio to record Imaginary Sonicscape in September 2000 at Studio Zen/Electric Space Studio. The album took many months to perfect under the direction of Yukito Okazaki from the stoner metal band Eternal Elysium. While the band's new sound was influenced by jazz, classical music and Frank Zappa, the lyrics of the album were based on the band's views on life and death. Band member Mirai described it as "Most of they [sic] lyrics on the album are about life and death and fear of getting old, fear of losing somebody you love." The style of the album draws from many genres outside of the extreme metal sound, occasionally drifting into sounds ranging from dub, giggling babies, jazz fusion and disco. Frontman Mirai explained that the band "never intend to make it musically varied or weird. I always choose the best way to express the feeling. Sometimes it could be heavy guitars while sometimes it could be a classical piano solo. And as a result, sometimes the song has lots of different elements. It's just a result, not a purpose." The band finished recording the album in March 2001.

== Reception ==
Professional ratings
Review scores
Source	Rating
AllMusic	4.5/5 stars
Kerrang!	4/5 stars

Imaginary Sonicscape was released on July 4, 2001. The album failed to chart in the United States. The album was well received from the extreme metal audience. The British extreme music magazine Terrorizer placed the album as the 10th best album of 2001. William York of the music database Allmusic gave the album four and a half stars out of five noting that "On one hand, this is great heavy metal, and on the other, it's genuinely twisted experimental/psychedelic music. An amazing, weird album, and also the best place for newcomers to start with this band."

== Track listing ==
All tracks are written by Mirai and Sigh except where noted.

No.	Title	Length
1.	"Corpsecry - Angelfall"	6:42
2.	"Scarlet Dream"	5:11
3.	"Nietzschean Conspiracy" (Bård Eithun, Mirai)	5:24
4.	"A Sunset Song"	6:49
5.	"Impromptu (Allegro Maestoso)" (Mirai)	1:24
6.	"Dreamsphere (Return to the Chaos)"	6:51
7.	"Ecstatic Transformation"	5:35
8.	"Slaughtergarden Suite": 1. "At Dawn"; 2. "The Dead Are Born"; 3. "Destiny"; 4. "Slaughtergarden"; 5. "Aftermath"	10:57
9.	"Bring Back the Dead"	6:40
10.	"Requiem - Nostalgia" (Ends with excerpt of Frédéric Chopin's Minute Waltz)	7:52

The album was remastered and reissued in 2009 with two bonus tracks: "Voices" and "Born Condemned Criminal," and a longer version of "Bring Back the Dead":

No.	Title	Length
1.	"Corpsecry - Angelfall"	6:42
2.	"Scarlet Dream"	5:10
3.	"Nietzschean Conspiracy" (Bård Eithun, Mirai)	5:24
4.	"A Sunset Song"	6:49
5.	"Impromptu (Allegro Maestoso)" (Mirai)	1:24
6.	"Dreamsphere (Return to the Chaos)"	6:50
7.	"Voices"	7:02
8.	"Ecstatic Transformation"	5:35
9.	"Born Condemned Criminal"	5:43
10.	"Slaughtergarden Suite": 1. "At Dawn"; 2. "The Dead Are Born"; 3. "Destiny"; 4. "Slaughtergarden"; 5. "Aftermath"	10:57
11.	"Bring Back the Dead"	8:22
12.	"Requiem - Nostalgia" (Ends with excerpt of Frédéric Chopin's Minute Waltz)	7:58

== Personnel ==
- Mirai - Fender Rhodes, Hammond, minimoog, Yamaha acoustic piano, Hohner clavinet, Yamaha string machine, Roland vocoder, other keyboards, sampling, programming, modulator, effects, Speak & Spell, recorder, melodeon, bass, vocals
- Shinichi - Fender Stratocaster, Fender Telecaster, Takamine acoustic guitar, programming bass Yamaha RX-5
- Satoshi - drums, tambourine, triangle, bongo, hand claps, suspended cymbal, bar chimes, vibraslap

=== Technical personnel ===
- Yukito Okazaki - engineering
- Sigh - producer
- Alan Douches - mastering
- Stephen O'Malley - cover design
- Tenkotsu Kawaho - photography
