= Scorn Defeat =

Studio album by Sigh
- Released: December 1993
- Recorded: March 1993
- Genre: Black metal
- Length: 43:05
- Label: Deathlike Silence
- Producer: Y. Toyoda

Sigh chronology
Scorn Defeat (1993)	Infidel Art (1995)

Professional ratings
Review scores
Source	Rating
AllMusic	4/5 stars
Kerrang!	2/5 stars

Scorn Defeat is the first full-length album by the Japanese black metal band Sigh, released in 1993 by Deathlike Silence Productions. It is the band's most traditional black metal album, taking on a formula lyrically compared to their Scandinavian peers. The album takes its title from a line in the title track from Venom's 1981 album Welcome to Hell. On Scorn Defeat, the line itself is said on "At My Funeral".

In 2013, Decibel ranked Scorn Defeat at number 70 on its list of the Top 100 Black Metal Albums of All Time.

== Reissues ==
The first edition of Scorn Defeat features a black-and-white illustration on the cover art. On the second edition, reissued in 1994, an image of guitarist Shinichi Ishikawa is featured. Both are long since out of print due to poor distribution, as they were published on Deathlike Silence following the death of its founder Euronymous.

In 2000 the album was reissued by Psychic Scream Entertainment, including a bonus track, "The Seven Gates of Hell," which is a Venom cover, and completely new artwork.

A vinyl version was also released by Vinyl Collectors (limited to 500 copies) including a cover of Mayhem's "Carnage."

Reissued again in 2009 by Enucleation (once again with new artwork), this version includes the Requiem for Fools EP (1992), which allowed them to sign to DSP, and their split 7-inch EP with Kawir (1994), neither of which have ever been available on CD before. "The Seven Gates of Hell", however, is not included on this release.

In 2011 Deepsend Records reissued the album once again. This double CD release includes all the tracks from the 2009 reissue on CD 1 and other unreleased tracks, demo and cover songs on CD 2.

== Track listing ==
Side Revenge
No.	Title	Length
1.	"A Victory of Dakini"	6:50
2.	"The Knell"	4:20
3.	"At My Funeral"	5:42
4.	"Gundali"	5:56

Side Violence
No.	Title	Length
5.	"Ready for the Final War"	9:15
6.	"Weakness Within"	3:07
7.	"Taste Defeat"	7:55
Total length:		43:05

2009 Reissue Bonus Tracks

8. "The Knell" [Requiem For Fools 7-inch EP (92)] - 3:21
9. "Desolation" [Requiem For Fools 7-inch EP (92)] - 4:16
10. "Taste Defeat" [Requiem For Fools 7-inch EP (92)] - 7:27
11. "Suicidogenic" [Split 7-inch EP With Kawir (94)] - 3:10
12. "Schizo" [Split 7-inch EP With Kawir (94)] - 3:19

2011 Reissue Bonus Tracks (CD 2)

13. "Black Metal" (Venom cover) [Unreleased] - 2:40
14. "The Zombie Terror" [Far East Gate In Inferno compilation CD (94)] - 9:40
15. "The Seven Gates of Hell" (Venom cover) [Vinyl Collectors LP (96)] - 4:33
16. "Carnage" (Mayhem cover) [Vinyl Collectors LP (96)] - 3:14
17. "Weakness Within" [Desolation Demo] - 3:06
18. "Desolation Of My Mind" [Desolation Demo] - 3:17
19. "Mentally Numb" [Desolation Demo] - 0:57
20. "Death Throes" [Tragedies Rough Mix] - 2:06
21. "Sigh" [Tragedies Rough Mix] - 2:12
22. "Mentally Numb" [Tragedies Rough Mix] - 5:53
23. "Desolation" [Tragedies Rough Mix] - 2:04

== Personnel ==
- Mirai Kawashima – vocals, keyboard, bass
- Shinichi Ishikawa – guitar
- Satoshi Fujinami – drums
