= Hangman's Hymn =

Studio album by Sigh
- Released: May 23, 2007 (Japan); June 12, 2007
- Recorded: Studio Moopies/Studio Sarasvati Jan.-Nov. 2006
- Genre: Black metal, avant-garde metal
- Length: 44:17
- Label: Osmose; The End; Soundholic (Japan)
- Producer: Sigh

Sigh chronology
Gallows Gallery (2005)	Hangman's Hymn (2007)	Scenes from Hell (2010)

Professional ratings
Review scores
Source	Rating
Allmusic	link

Hangman's Hymn: Musikalische Exequien is the seventh studio album by the Japanese heavy metal band Sigh. It is their first album for The End Records. Audio samples on The End website suggest Sigh have kept their clean vocals style as shown on their previous album as well as returned to a black metal-styled vocalization.

Their 2007 song "Inked in Blood" from the album Hangman's Hymn was named number 31 on Loudwire's list of the Top 21st Century Metal Songs.

== Track listing ==
Act I
No.	Title	Length
1.	"Introitus/Kyrie"	4:30
2.	"Inked in Blood"	3:21
3.	"Me-Devil"	3:17

Act II
No.	Title	Length
4.	"Dies Iræ/The Master Malice"	5:45
5.	"The Memories as a Sinner"	3:32
6.	"Death with Dishonor"	3:04
7.	"In Devil's Arms"	4:33

Act III
No.	Title	Length
8.	"Overture/Rex Tremendæ/I Saw the World's End"	6:06
9.	"Salvation in Flame/Confutatis"	5:08
10.	"Hangman's Hymn/In Paradisum/Das Ende"	5:11

== Personnel ==
- Mirai Kawasima - Vocal, orchestrations, piano
- Satoshi Fujinami - Bass
- Shinichi Ishikawa - Guitar
- Junichi Harashima - Drums
- Rob Urbinati (Sacrifice) - Guitar solo on #4
- Mike "Gunface" McKenzie (The Red Chord) - Guitar solo on #7
- Chuck Keller (Ares Kingdom) - Guitar solo on #5
- Aurielle Gregory (Giant Squid) - Female vocal on #4
- Tim Conroy - Trumpet on #1, #4, #10
- Steven Sagala (Enforsaken) - Requiem choir
- Void (Samas) - Requiem choir
- Glendalis Gonzalez - Requiem choir
- Claire Joseph - Requiem choir
- Zack Bissell - Requiem choir
- Grant Taylor - Requiem choir
- T. Osada – Audio engineering
- James Murphy – Mastering engineer
