= In Somniphobia =

Studio album by Sigh
- Released: 13 March 2012
- Recorded: 2010–2011, at Studio Moopies and Electric Space Studio
- Genre: Black metal, avant-garde metal
- Length: 64:39
- Label: Candlelight
- Producer: Sigh

Sigh chronology
Scenes from Hell (2010)	In Somniphobia (2012)	Graveward (2015)

Professional ratings
Review scores
Source	Rating
Allmusic	4/5 stars
Exclaim!	Favorable
Chronicles of Chaos	9/10 stars
Revolver Magazine	4.5/5 stars
Thrash Hits	5/6 stars

In Somniphobia is the ninth studio album released by Japanese extreme metal band Sigh. It was released on 13 March 2012 under the independent record label Candlelight Records.

== Track listing ==
All tracks are written by Mirai Kawashima, except where noted.

No.	Title	Lyrics	Length
1.	"Purgatorium"		4:48
2.	"The Transfiguration Fear"		4:51
3.	"Opening Theme: Lucid Nightmare"		1:58
4.	"Somniphobia"		7:34
5.	"L'Excommunication à Minuit"		5:38
6.	"Amnesia"		8:10
7.	"Far Beneath the In-Between"	Kam Lee	7:10
8.	"Amongst the Phantoms of Abandoned Tumbrils"	Metatron	9:31
9.	"Ending Theme: Continuum"		1:42
10.	"Fall to the Thrall"		5:17
11.	"Equale": 1. "Prelude"; 2. "Fugato"; 3. "Coda"		8:00
Total length:			64:39

== Personnel ==
=== Sigh ===
- Mirai Kawashima – vocals, piano, Minimoog, Prophet-5, Clavinet D-6, organ, Roland RE-201, vocoder, ring modulator, recorder, sitar, tabla, tampura, shortwave radio, jaw harp, glockenspiel
- Dr. Mikannibal – alto saxophone, vocals
- Satoshi Fujinami – bass
- Shinichi Ishikawa – guitar
- Junichi Harashima – drums

=== Guest musicians ===
- Metatron – vocals and narration on tracks 3 and 8
- Kam Lee – vocals on track 7
- Barmanu – sarangi
- Adam Matlock – clarinet on tracks 6 and 11, accordion on track 8
- Jonathan Fisher – trumpet on tracks 8 and 11

=== Other personnel ===
- Takamichi Osada – engineering
- Tim Turan – mastering
- Eliran Kantor – artwork
- Tenkotsu Kawaho – photos
