= Inhuman Condition =

EP by Massacre
- Released: March 30, 1992
- Recorded: March 1991 (track 4); December 1991 (tracks 1–3)
- Studio: Morrisound Recording, Tampa, Florida
- Genre: Death metal
- Length: 20:38
- Label: Earache
- Producer: Massacre

Massacre chronology
From Beyond (1991)	Inhuman Condition (1992)	Promise (1996)

Inhuman Condition is an EP by the American death metal band Massacre. It was released in 1992 by Earache Records.

== Track listing ==
1. "Inhuman Condition" – 5:41
2. "Plains of Insanity" – 4:48
3. "Warhead" – 5:16 (Venom cover)
4. "Provoked Accurser" – 4:53

== Credits ==
Band members

- Kam Lee – vocals
- Rick Rozz – guitar
- Steve Swanson – guitar on tracks 1–3
- Terry Butler – bass
- Bill Andrews – drums

Guest musicians

- Cronos – additional vocals on track 3
- Walter Trachsler – guitar on track 4

Production

- Rick Miller – engineer
- Edward J. Repka – artwork

Recorded at Morrisound Recording, Tampa, Florida, December 1991
