= Ghastly Funeral Theatre =

Extended play by Sigh

EP by Sigh
- Released: 1997
- Genre: Black metal, avant-garde metal
- Length: 23:22
- Label: Cacophonous

Sigh chronology
Infidel Art (1995)	Ghastly Funeral Theatre (1997)	Hail Horror Hail (1997)

Ghastly Funeral Theatre (Japanese 葬式劇場, Sōshiki gekijō) is an EP by the band Sigh. Ghastly Funeral Theatre marked the beginning of Sigh's progressive and avant-garde experimentation prior to the release of Hail Horror Hail.

The album was reissued on vinyl on January 26, 2010 by The Crypt, and included the Tragedies demo from 1990. It was limited to 500 copies: 250 of which were in black, the other 250 were in green.

== Track listing ==
1. "Intro: Soushiki" ("葬式") – 1:18
2. "Shingontachikawa" ("真言立川") – 5:26
3. "Doman Seman" ("ドーマン・セーマン") – 5:32
4. "Imiuta" ("忌み歌") – 3:14
5. "Shikigami" ("式神") – 6:21
6. "Outro: Higeki" ("悲劇") – 1:31

== Personnel ==
- Mirai: vocals, bass guitar, piano, keyboards
- Shinichi: acoustic & electric guitar
- Satoshi: drums, percussion
