= Hail Horror Hail =

Studio album by Sigh
- Released: November 21, 1997
- Genre: Avant-garde metal, black metal
- Length: 51:33
- Label: Cacophonous

Sigh chronology
Ghastly Funeral Theatre (1997)	Hail Horror Hail (1997)	Scenario IV: Dread Dreams (1999)

Professional ratings
Review scores
Source	Rating
Allmusic	3.5/5 stars

Hail Horror Hail is the third studio album by the band Sigh. It was released by Cacophonous Records originally in 1997.

The album is the band's first full-length release to feature an avant-garde/experimental sound not normally associated with black metal music. A message written in the album's liner notes dictates the following:

"This album is way beyond the conceived notion of how metal, or music, should be. In essence it is a movie without pictures; a celluloid phantasmagoria. Accordingly, the film jumps, and another scene, seemingly unconnected with the previous context, is suddenly inserted in between frames. Every sound on this album is deliberate, and if you find that some parts of this album are strange, it isn't because the music is in itself strange, but because your conscious self is ill-equipped to comprehend the sounds produced on this recording."

Hail Horror Hail was listed in the British extreme music magazine Terrorizer as the ninth best release of 1997 and made it on their top 100 list of most important albums of the 90's.

== Track listing ==
No.	Title	Length
1.	"Hail Horror Hail"	5:07
2.	"42 49"	7:43
3.	"12 Souls"	6:56
4.	"Burial"	1:30
5.	"The Dead Sing"	7:14
6.	"Invitation to Die"	5:17
7.	"Pathetic"	2:21
8.	"Curse of Izanagi"	6:01
9.	"Seed of Eternity"	9:19
Total length:		51:33

== Personnel ==
- Mirai – vocals, bass guitar, synthesizer, piano, Hammond organ, vocoder, sampling, programming, radio, effects
- Shinichi – acoustic and electric guitar, bass guitar
- Satoshi – drums, triangle, tambourine, guiro, vibraslap, handclaps
