= Infidel Art =

Studio album by Sigh
- Released: October 1995
- Genre: Black metal
- Length: 50:53
- Label: Cacophonous

Sigh chronology
Scorn Defeat (1993)	Infidel Art (1995)	Ghastly Funeral Theatre (1997)

Infidel Art is the second studio album by the Japanese black metal band Sigh. Considered a maturation of their overall sound the songs on this album are longer and more atmospheric than those on Sigh's previous effort Scorn Defeat; five of the album's six songs exceed the eight-minute mark.

== Track listing ==
Side Terror
No.	Title	Length
1.	"Izuna"	8:16
2.	"The Zombie Terror"	9:42
3.	"Desolation"	8:03

Side Funeral
No.	Title	Length
4.	"The Last Elegy"	10:29
5.	"Suicidogenic"	4:45
6.	"Beyond Centuries"	9:38
Total length:		50:53

== Reissue ==
On June 17, 2013, the album was reissued by Canadian label Virus Production on cassette as part of a boxed set that also included three cassettes of live recordings from early 1990s Sigh shows.

Tape I – Infidel Art

1. "Izuna" – 8:16
2. "The Zombie Terror" – 9:43
3. "Desolation" – 8:03
4. "The Last Elegy" – 10:30
5. "Suicidogenic" – 4:46
6. "Beyond Centuries" – 9:38

Tape II – Nishi-ogikubo Turning, Tokyo November 28, 1990

1. "Weakness Within"
2. "Evil Dead"
3. "Desolation of My Mind"
4. "Sigh"
5. "Psycho"
6. "Mentally Numb"
7. "Death Throes"
8. "Schizo"
9. "Desolation of My Mind"
10. "Sigh"

Tape III – Live at Harajuku Los Angeles, Tokyo August 26, 1991

1. "The Knell"
2. "Death Throes"
3. "Mentally Numb"
4. "Desolation of My Mind"
5. "Weakness Within"

Tape IV – Music Farm, Nagoya Oct 2nd '94

1. "Intro – Black Metal"
2. "Seven Gates of Hell"
3. "Suicidogenic"
4. "Schizo"
5. "Taste Defeat"
6. "Poison"
7. "Witching Hour"

== Personnel ==
- Mirai Kawashima – bass, keyboard, synthesizer, vocals
- Shinichi Ishikawa – acoustic guitar, electric guitar
- Satoshi Fujinami – drums, percussion
