= Massacre (death metal band) =

American death metal band

- Also known as: Massacre X (2016–2017); Gods of Death (2017–2019)
- Origin: Tampa, Florida, U.S.
- Genres: Death metal Heavy metal
- Years active: 1984; 1984–1987; 1989–1992; 1993–1996; 2007–2008; 2011–2014; 2016–present
- Labels: Earache; Century Media; Nuclear Blast Records
- Members: Kam Lee; Elden Santos; Carlos Gonzalez; Tim Wilson
- Past members: Former members

Massacre (briefly known as Massacre X and Gods of Death) is an American death metal band. They were formed in 1984 by Allen West, Bill Andrews, and Mike Borders, soon after vocalist Kam Lee joined. The band has reunited several times with varying lineups, most recently in late 2016.

== History ==
Massacre were formed in 1984 by bassist Mike Borders, drummer Bill Andrews, guitarist Allen West as a heavy metal band and was soon joined by lead vocalist Kam Lee, at which point their style transitioned towards death metal. After their first demo, their line-up settled with guitarist Rick Rozz (formerly of Mantas, an early incarnation of Death) and bassist Terry Butler. They disbanded and re-united again several times. In 1987, Rozz, Andrews and Butler joined Death. After being fired by Death in 1989, Rick Rozz reformed Massacre with Lee and they managed to get a deal with Earache Records, releasing their debut album From Beyond in 1991, followed by an EP, Inhuman Condition (featuring Cronos of Venom), a year later. After the release of the EP the band split up again. Rozz reformed the band in 1993 and released a new album Promise in 1996. Kam Lee left the band during post-production of Promise due to being dissatisfied with the songs and his performance, disowning the album. The album was widely hated by fans and Kenny Goodwin replaced Lee temporarily at the time. The band quickly broke up after Promise was released. Kam Lee, Terry Butler and Steve Swanson along with Sam Williams and Curtis Beeson temporarily reunited as Massacre in 2006. Butler, Lee, Beeson and Williams then founded Denial Fiend, with Blaine Cook replacing Lee and Rob Rampy replacing Beeson in 2008. In 2011, Butler and Rozz reunited for an anniversary tour of From Beyond beginning January 14 in Tampa, Florida.

== Reformation ==
Butler and Rozz reformed Massacre in late 2011, with Mike Mazzonetto on drums and Ed Webb on vocals, and subsequently played the 70,000 Tons of Metal cruise from Miami, Florida to Grand Cayman in January 2012. In March 2012, under the wing of lawyer Eric Greif – coincidentally Butler and Rozz's manager in Death – the band signed an international recording deal with Century Media Records, announcing a 7" release prior to their August 2012 appearance at the Wacken Festival in Germany and the release of their album in early 2014.

On December 11, 2014, it was announced that bassist Terry Butler and vocalist Ed Webb left the band. As a result, Massacre disbanded.

Massacre reformed once more in December 2016 under the name Massacre X, in reference to it being the band's tenth line-up. However, original drummer Bill Andrews threatened to sue the band over the use of the name, leading to them rebranding themselves as Gods of Death, in reference to their significance in the development of death metal. Michael Grim returned to his old school death metal band Embodiment ( USA ). The band eventually returned to using the original Massacre moniker in July 2019, with former bassist Michael Borders returning to the band.

On September 9, 2019, it was announced that Rick Rozz and Mike Mazzonetto had both quit the band, according to founding member Kam Lee. The band announced a new line-up three months later and plans to release a new studio album in 2020. However, less than a year later, it was announced new members Taylor Nordberg and Jeramie Kling had left the band. A week later, the band announced its latest line-up with new guitarists Rogga Johansson, Jonny Pettersson, and Scott Fairfax, as well as new drummer Brynjar Helgetun.

On August 6, 2021, the band announced that their fourth album, Resurgence, would be released on October 22.

On September 5, 2024, the band announced that their fifth album, Necrolution, would be released on November 8.

== Associated acts ==
Members and ex-members of Massacre have played in many notable bands, most notably Death, Obituary, Six Feet Under, Metalucifer, Hate Plow, Kreator, Nasty Savage, Embodiment (USA), Zero Hour and Whiplash.

== Band members ==
=== Current members ===
- Kam Lee – lead vocals (1984–1987, 1989–1994, 2006–2007, 2017–present)
- Michael Borders – bass (1984–1986, 2019–present; studio only)
- Rogga Johansson – rhythm guitar (2020–present; studio only)
- Jonny Pettersson – lead guitar, keyboards, backing vocals (2020–present; studio only)
- Jon Rudin – drums (2023–present; studio only)

=== Former members ===
- Bill Andrews – drums (1984, 1984–1987, 1990–1993)
- Mark Brents – lead vocals (1984, 1984)
- Allen West – lead guitar (1984, 1984–1986)
- J.P. Chartier – rhythm guitar (1984, 1984)
- Scott Blackwood – bass (1984)
- Rick Rozz – rhythm guitar (1984–1986, 1989–1996, 2011–2014, 2017–2019), lead guitar (1986–1987, 1989–1991, 1993–1996, 2011–2014, 2017–2019)
- Rob Goodwin – rhythm guitar (1986–1987)
- Terry Butler – bass (1987, 1990–1993, 2006–2007, 2011–2014)
- Butch Gonzalez – bass (1989–1991)
- Joe Cangelosi – drums (1989–1990)
- Steve Swanson – lead guitar (1991–1992, 2006–2007)
- Pete Sison – bass (1994–1996)
- Syrus Peters – drums (1994–1996)
- Kenny Goodwin – lead vocals, rhythm guitar (1994–1996)
- Sam Williams – rhythm guitar (2007–2008)
- Curtis Beeson – drums (2007–2008) (died 2024)
- Dave Pybus – bass (2007)
- Mike Mazzonetto – drums (2011–2014, 2017–2019)
- Ed Webb – vocals (2011–2014)
- Michael Grim – bass (2017–2019)
- Taylor Nordberg – guitars (2019–2020)
- Jeramie Kling – drums, backing vocals (2019–2020)
- Scott Fairfax – lead guitar (2020–2023)
- Brynjar Helgetun – drums (2020–2023)

=== Live members ===
- Elden Santos – drums (2021–present)
- Carlos Gonzalez – lead guitar (2022–present)
- Eric Little – bass, backing vocals (2024–present)
- Michael Grim – rhythm guitar (2026 - present)

== Discography ==
=== Studio albums ===
- From Beyond (1991)
- Promise (1996)
- Back from Beyond (2014)
- Resurgence (2021)
- Necrolution (2024)

=== EPs ===
- Inhuman Condition (1992)
- Condemned to the Shadows (2012)
- Mythos (2022)
- Casket Mutilations (2022)

=== Demos ===
- Aggressive Tyrant (1986)
- Chamber of Ages (1986)
- The Second Coming (1990)

=== Compilations ===
- Tyrants of Death (2006, Iron Pegasus)
- The Second Coming (2008, Hell's Headbangers)
