= Kam Lee =

American death metal vocalist

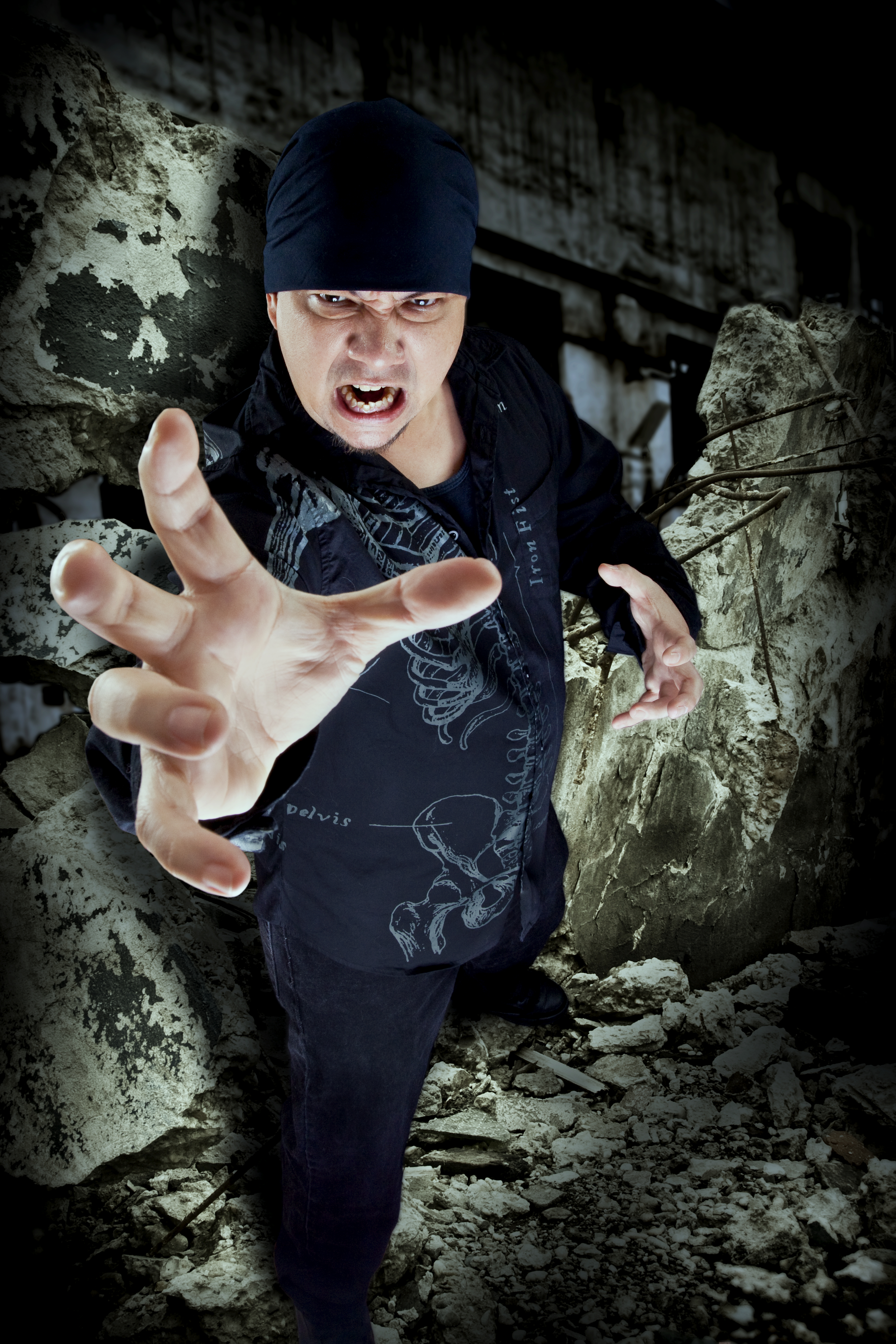

Background information
- Born: Barney Kamalani Lee; 1966 (age 59–60); Honolulu, Hawaii, U.S.
- Genres: Death metal
- Occupation: Singer
- Instruments: Vocals; drums
- Member of: Massacre
- Formerly of: Death

Barney Kamalani "Kam" Lee (born 1966) is an American musician. He is the lead vocalist of the death metal band Massacre. He is also known for his vocal contributions to Death from 1983 to 1985.

== Career ==
Lee was one of the founding members of Mantas (later renamed Death). He also played drums in the band and was the original vocalist.

Massacre recorded two demo tapes that were heavily distributed using the tape trading system but did not lead to a record deal. The band dissolved when members Rick Rozz, Bill Andrews and Terry Butler left to join a later inception of Death; however, the subsequent citing of Massacre as influences by bands such as Napalm Death signified a great interest in the defunct act within the death metal community. This led to a reformation and the recording of the album From Beyond on Earache Records, made up mainly of reworking of the songs featured on the original 1985 and 1986 demo tapes.

Lee has also been a member of many other short-lived bands. In 2006 he joined a band with Terry Butler (Death/Massacre/Six Feet Under), Sam Williams and Curtis Beeson called Denial Fiend which released their debut "They Rise" on October 16, 2007. In that same month, Massacre played their final gig in the United States on October 6, 2007. October 26, Massacre began their final tour dubbed "Re-Animated" in Berlin, Germany.

In 2009, Lee started the death metal band Bone Gnawer, with Rogga Johansson, Morgan Lie, and Ronnie Bjornstrom. Later that year, Lee and Johansson would form another death metal band called The Grotesquery, along with members Johan Berglund and Brynjar Helgetun. He is also a member of the bands Grave Wax, The Skeletal, and Broken Gravestones.

Lee was cast as a serial killer in the 2011 independent horror film Deep Seeded. In 2012, he performed guest vocals on and contributed lyrics to Sigh's "Far Beneath the In-Between" on their album In Somniphobia.

In 2015, he formed the funeral doom band Akatharta, who released their first album Spiritus Immundus on June 23, 2017. In January 2016, he also announced a solo album for release later in the year, an EP entitled Reclamation of the Fallen which released on October 30 of that same year, the day before Lee's 50th birthday, which was Halloween. He also revealed a new death/thrash project named Gigantesque and an Alien-themed deathgrind project entitled Alienanalprobe that year, both of which have demo recordings. His latest band is a blackened death metal project called Nattravnen, in collaboration with underground Swedish musician Jonny Pettersson, who premiered a demo track in September 2016, and released their first complete track "Suicidium, the Seductress of Death" in January 2018, with their first album Kult of the Raven to release on December 7, 2018.

== Style and influences ==
Lee early on employed the vocal style called the death grunt or death growl, taking influence from Celtic Frost vocalist Thomas Gabriel Fischer (a.k.a. Tom G. Warrior). Lyrically, Lee drew heavily from the stories of American author H. P. Lovecraft, and one of his album’s cover arts featured a painting by artist Ed Repka, representing creatures from Lovecraft's imagination.

== Discography ==
=== With Death ===
- Rehearsal #1 (1984)
- Rehearsal #2 (1984)
- Rehearsal #3 (1984)
- Live Tape #1 (1984)
- Death by Metal (1984)
- Reign of Terror (1984)
- Live Tape #3 (1984)
- Live tape #2 (1984)
- Infernal Live (1984)
- Rehearsal tape #4 (1985)
- Rehearsal tape #5 (1985)
- Rehearsal tape #6 (1985)
- Infernal Death (1985)
- Live tape #6 (1985)
- Rigor Mortis (1985)
- Rehearsal tape #7 (1985)
- Rehearsal tape #8 (1985)
- Rehearsal tape #9 (1985)
- Rehearsal tape #10 (1985)
- Rehearsal tape #11 (1985)

=== With Massacre ===
Albums

- From Beyond (1991)
- Promise (1996)
- Resurgence (2021)
- Necrolution (2024)

EPs

- Inhuman Condition (1992)
- Mythos (2022)

Demos

- Aggressive Tyrant (1986)
- Chamber of Ages (1986)
- Second Coming (1990)

=== With Denial Fiend ===
Albums

- They Rise (2007)

EPs

- Dead Awakening (2007)

Demos

- 4.23.06 Rehearsal Tape (2006)
- 2006 Demos (2006)

=== With The Grotesquery ===
Albums

- Tales of the Coffin Born (2010)
- The Facts and Terrifying Testament of Mason Hamilton: Tsathoggua Tales (2012)
- Curse of the Skinless Bride (2015)
- The Lupine Anathema (2018)

EPs

- Cult of Chthulu Calling (2014)

=== With Bone Gnawer ===
Albums

- Feast of Flesh (2009)
- Cannibal Crematorium (2015)

EPs

- Scissored (2010)
- Carved (2012)
- Canale di carneficina (2015)

Splits

- Bone Gnawer / Bonesaw (2009)
- Carved / Remains (2013)

=== With Broken Gravestones ===
EPs

- Let Sleeping Corpses Lie (2011)

Demos

- Broken Gravestones (2009)

=== With The Skeletal ===
Albums

- The Plague Rituals (2011)

EPs

- Remains (2013)

=== With Akatharta ===
- Spiritus Immundus (2017)

=== With Nattravnen ===
- Kult of the Raven (2018)

=== Solo work ===
Demos

- 7 Deadly Sins (2016)

EPs

- Reclamation of the Fallen (2016)
- Massacred (2019)

=== With Grave Wax ===
Splits

- Pestilent Formation (2011)
- Corpus Obscuria (2014)
- Four Paths to Horror (2015)
- Grave of Souls (2016)
