= Rick Rozz =

American guitarist (born 1967)

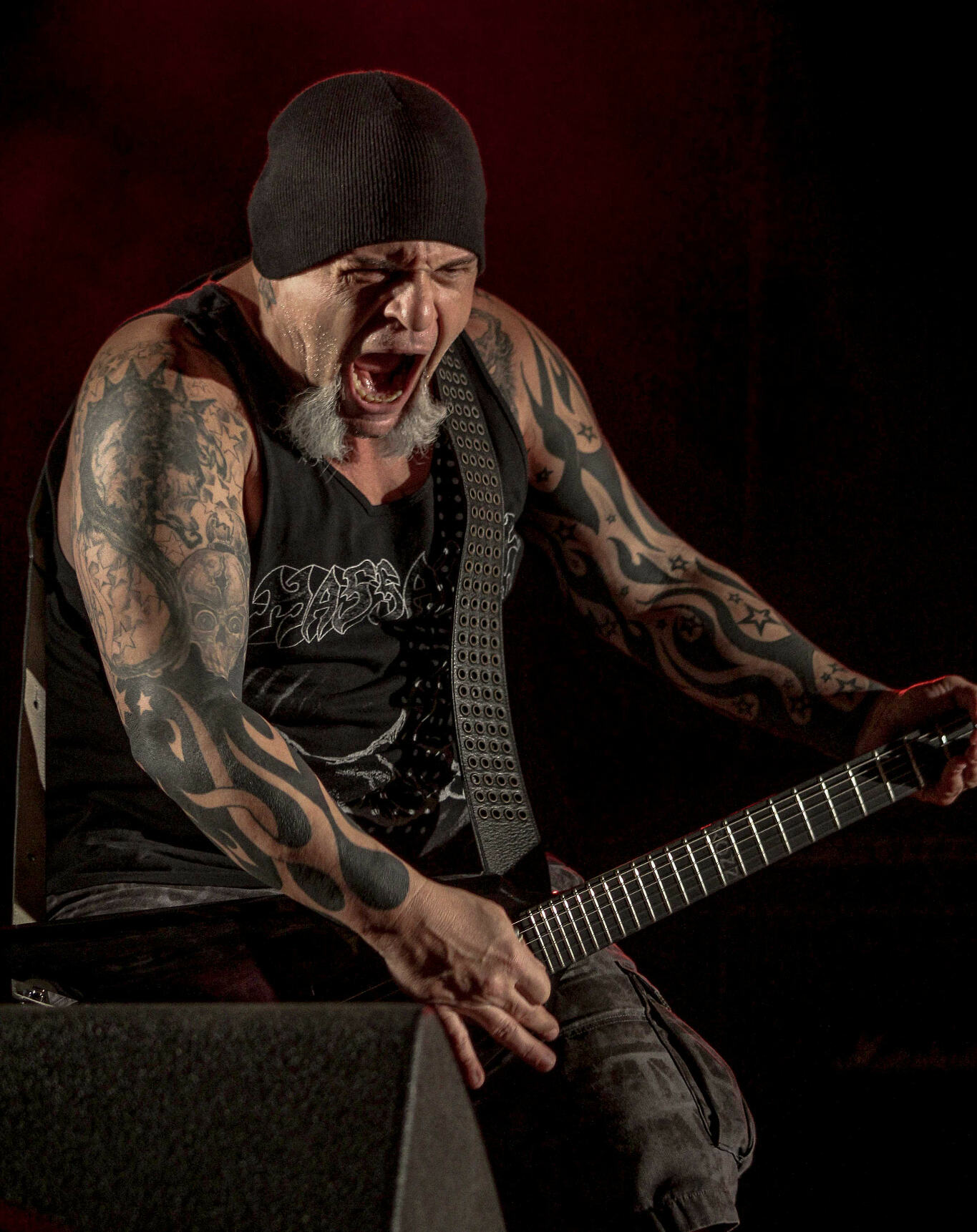

Background information
- Born: Frederick Donald DeLillo; January 9, 1967 (age 59); Altamonte Springs, Florida, US
- Genres: Death metal
- Occupation: Guitarist
- Years active: 1983–present
- Formerly of: Death, Massacre

Frederick Donald DeLillo (born January 9, 1967), known professionally as Rick Rozz, is an American guitarist. He grew up in Brooklyn, New York and spent his formative years in Altamonte Springs, Florida, attending Lake Brantley High School. He is best known for his work with the death metal bands Death and Massacre. He still resides in Florida.

He was a founding member of Death and rejoined the band in 1987, playing on and co-writing the Leprosy album in 1988. He also played on the Massacre albums From Beyond in 1990, the EP Inhuman Condition in 1991 and the more rock-oriented LP Promise in 1996. He also wrote the music for the 2014 Massacre release Back From Beyond on Century Media Records.

In 2019 Rozz reformed Massacre with original Mantas/Death/Massacre singer Kam Lee along with original Massacre bassist Michael Borders, and drummer Mike Mazzonetto (Pain Principle/Massacre) who played on the 2014 release Back From Beyond. At this time Massacre is playing weekend dates worldwide in 2019 and plan to continue in 2020.
