= Pull the Plug (song) =

Song by Death

from the album Leprosy
- Genre: Death metal
- Length: 4:53
- Label: Combat Records
- Songwriter: Chuck Schuldiner
- Producer: Scott Burns

"Pull the Plug" is a song by American death metal band Death released in 1988 as the fifth track from the band's sophomore album Leprosy.

The song was occasionally used to close the band's live sets later in its career.

== Composition and lyrics ==
Serving as an example of an early death metal track, "Pull the Plug" is considered to be ahead of its time. Revolver stated that compared to Death's later catalog, the song employed a "slightly thrashier tempo and uglier tone." Loudwire said the song's midtempo pace "makes you feel like you are indeed waiting around to die." The song is written from the perspective of a man who is begging to be taken off of life support. Loudwire stated that the song "evokes haunting emotions as the frontman screams out in anguish." The Guardian explained that the song's lyrics explore the narrator's thoughts as he is "listening as doctors and relatives discuss his treatment, unable to express his desire to end his life."

== Reception and legacy ==
Readers of Revolver voted the track as the best Death song. Staff writer Eli Enis described the song as "completely timeless", continuing: "While some of Death’s later albums have acquired more legacy status over time, the band’s 1988 sophomore album, Leprosy, is undoubtedly their most influential, and 'Pull the Plug' is pretty much the one." Loudwire also named it the best Death track, opining that it "boasts one of the most memorable choruses among the Death catalog, riff and vocal wise." Metal Storm said the song contained "the best chorus in metal history."
