= Sigh (band) =

Japanese black metal band

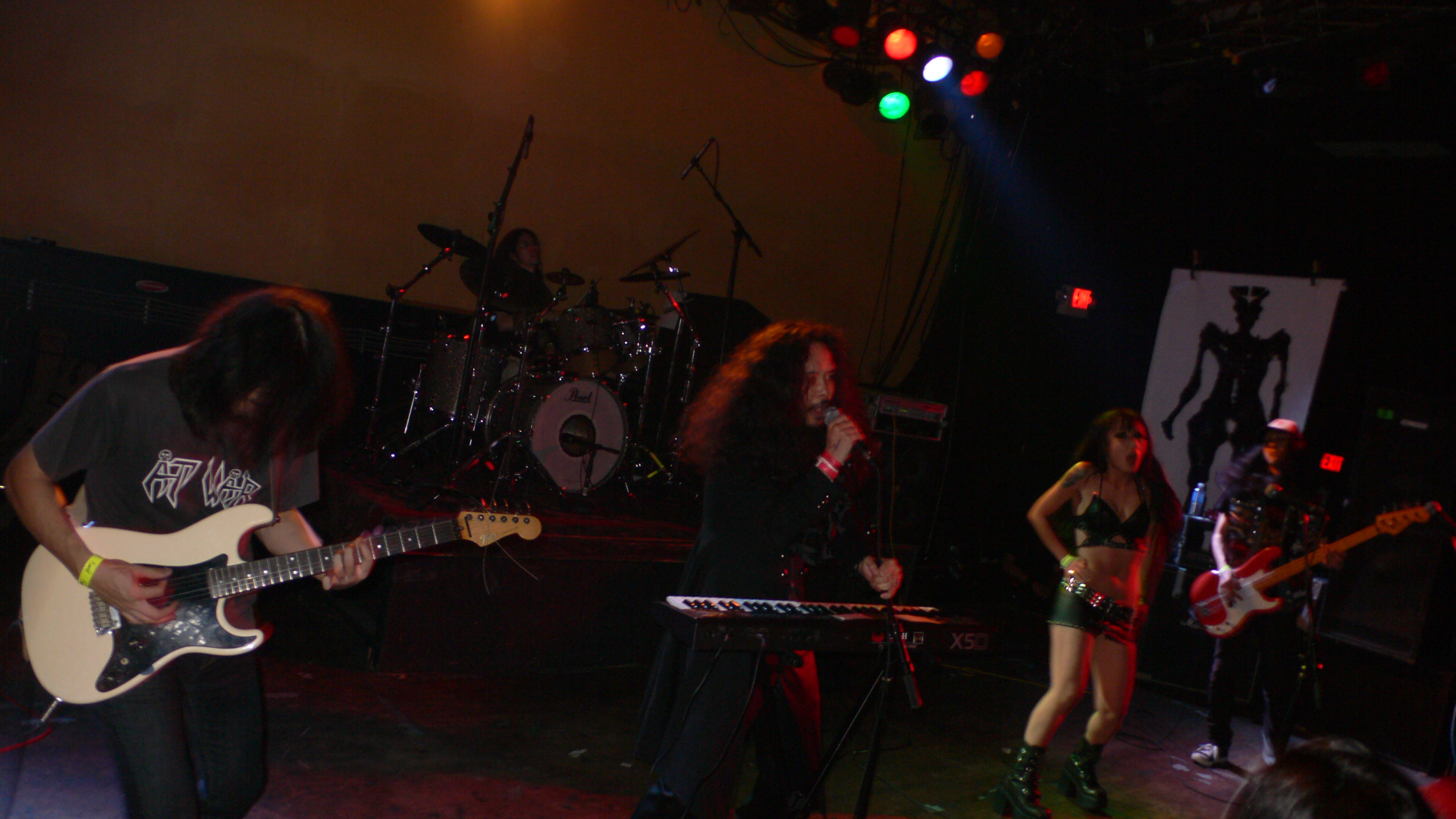
- Sigh performing in West Springfield, Virginia, 2008

Background information
- Origin: Tokyo, Japan
- Genres: Black metal; avant-garde metal
- Years active: 1989–present
- Labels: Deathlike Silence; Cacophonous; Century Media; Candlelight; The End; Mort Productions; Peaceville
- Members: Mirai Kawashima; Dr. Mikannibal; Nozomu Wakai
- Past members: Kazuki; Shinichi Ishikawa; You Oshima; Junichi Harashima; Satoshi Fujinami

Sigh (Japanese: サイ, Hepburn: Sai) is a Japanese experimental metal band from Tokyo, formed in 1989. They shifted from traditional extreme metal to an experimental, avant-garde style with symphonic, world music, and progressive elements. They released their most recent studio album, Goh-Ka, in 2026.

== History ==
Sigh was founded as a Nordic-influenced black metal band in 1989, with bassist/vocalist/keyboardist Mirai Kawashima, guitarist Satoshi Fujinami, and drummer Kazuki. The band has experienced many lineup changes. Kawashima remains in the band and has played many different instruments.

The band recorded their first demos in 1990. After the EP Requiem for the Fools, Norwegian musician and producer Euronymous signed Sigh to Deathlike Silence Records. That label released Sigh's first full-length album, Scorn Defeat, in 1993, shortly after Euronymous's murder. The album has been praised for combining black metal with symphonic elements. Deathlike Silence Records ceased to exist and Sigh signed with Cacophonous Records, which released their next three albums. Those albums incorporated classical and avant-garde music. In 1995, Sigh contributed to a Venom tribute album.

After disputes with Cacophonous over promotion and album rights, the band signed with Century Media Records. Their 2001 album with Century Media, Imaginary Sonicscape, was praised for pioneering surrealist black metal. Sigh later released albums on Candlelight/Baphomet Records and The End Records. Loudwire named their 2007 song "Inked in Blood", from the album Hangman's Hymn, number 31 on a list of the Top 21st Century Metal Songs. The band is featured in the 2008 documentary Global Metal. By the end of that decade, the band added drummer Junichi Harashima and saxophonist/backup singer Dr. Mikannibal (Mika Kawashima). Second guitarist You Oshima (formerly of Kadenzza) joined in 2014.

In the 2010s, Sigh continued to experiment with various genres, turning toward progressive metal. They released their eleventh album, Heir to Despair, in 2018. It incorporated instruments and compositional styles from traditional Japanese music. Band leader Mirai Kawashima learned to play flute for this album, and it also incorporates Middle Eastern and Central Asian sounds. In 2022, Sigh's twelfth full-length album, Shiki, continued mixing progressive metal with Japanese instrumentation. Later, Japanese guitarist Nozomu Wakai joined. Sigh performed at several European festivals, and released the live album LIVE: The Eastern Forces of Evil 2022 in 2023.

== Legacy ==
In 2025, Jordan Blum of Loudwire wrote: "When you think of Japanese progressive black metal, you inevitably think of Sigh, not only because they were one of the first black metal bands from the region, but also because they’re among the most innovative, multifaceted and appealing."

== Band members ==
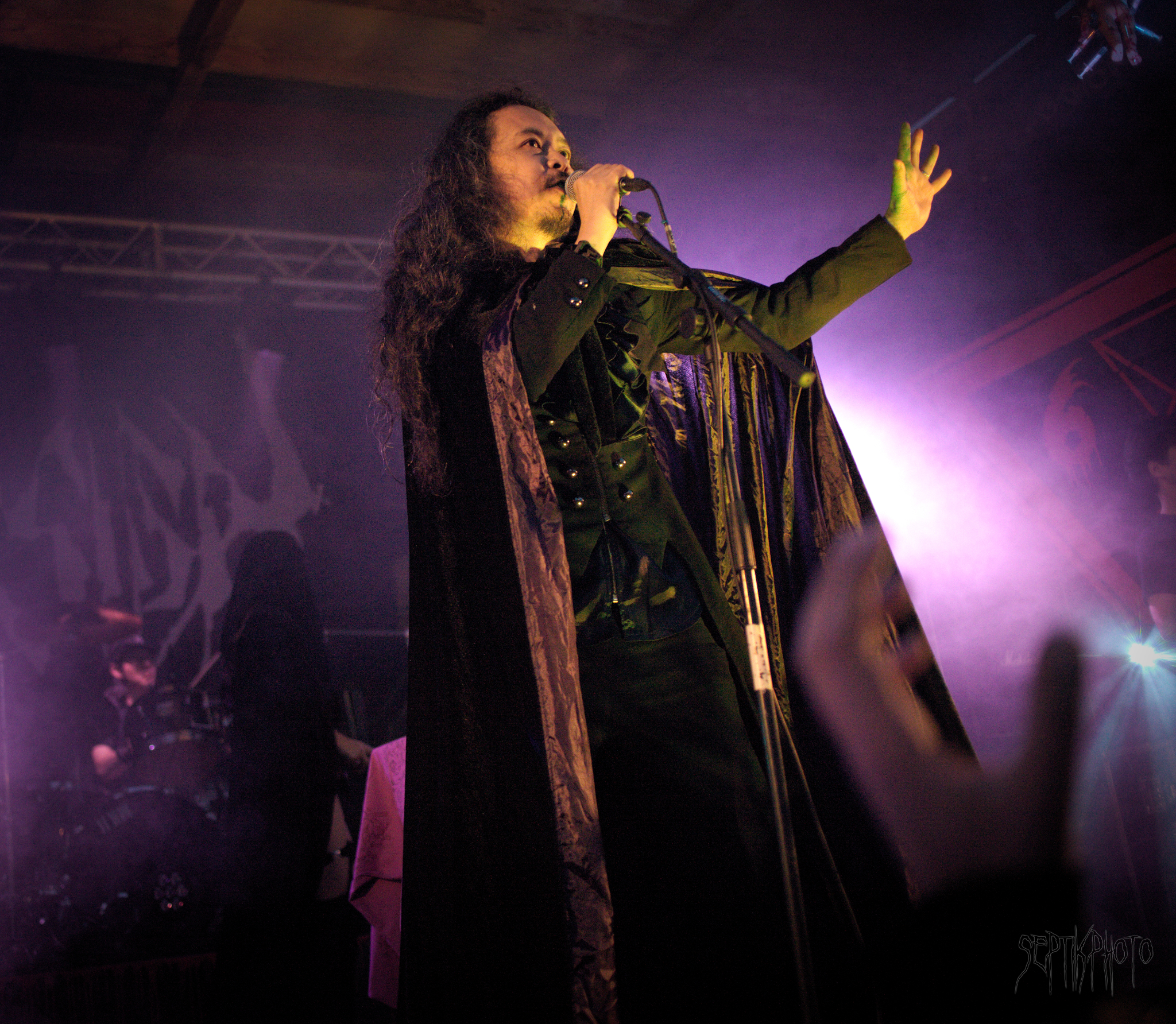
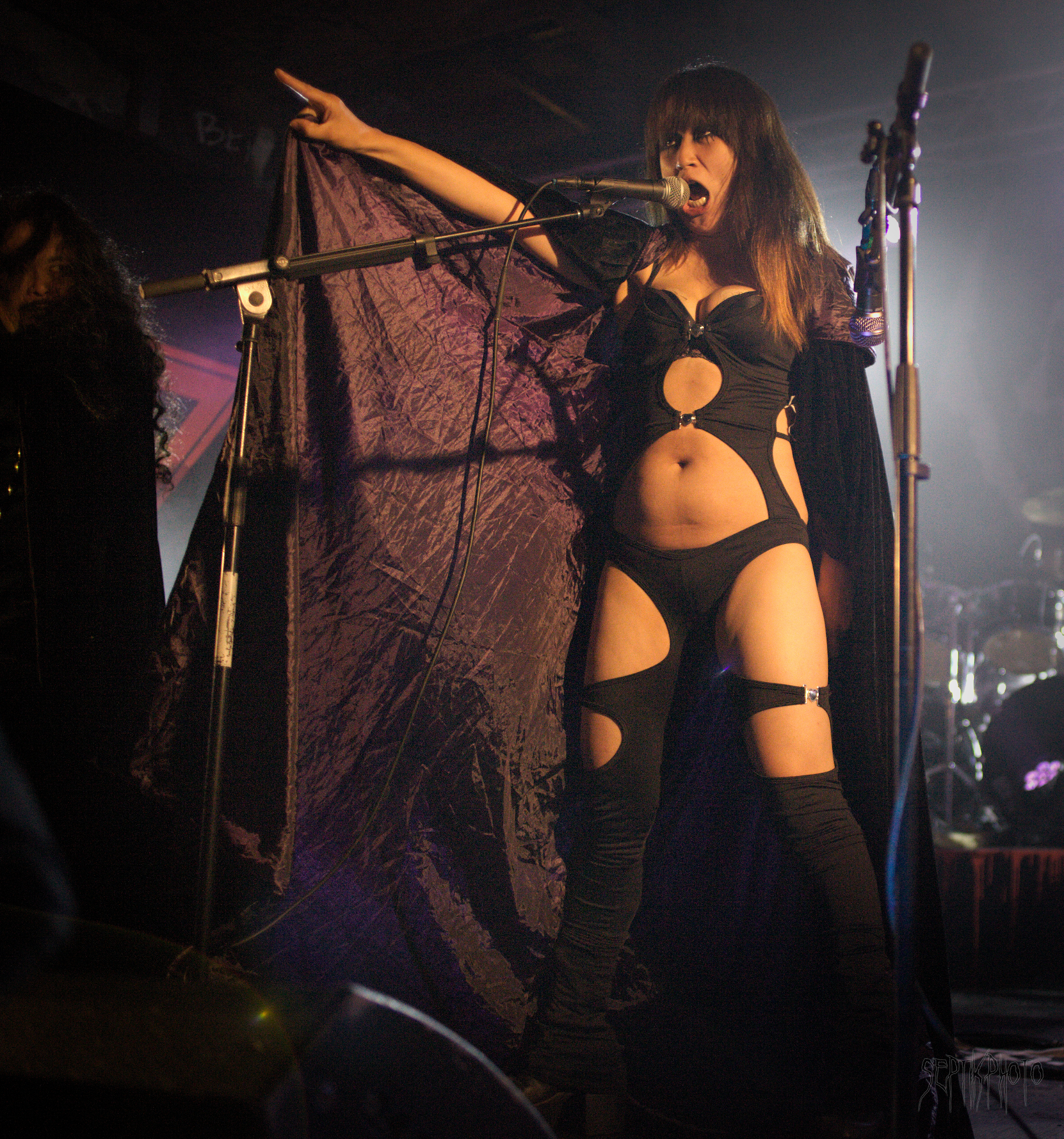
Vocalists Mirai Kawashima and Dr. Mikannibal performing in Fredericia, Denmark, 2018

Current

- Mirai Kawashima (川嶋未来) – lead vocals, keyboards, sampling, programming, vocoder (1989–present), woodwinds (2010–present), bass (1989–2004, 2022–present), percussion (2004–present), orchestral arrangements (2007–present)
- Nozomu Wakai (若井望) – guitars (2022–present),
- Dr. Mikannibal (ミカンニバル博士) – alto saxophone, vocals, shamisen (2007–present)

Current touring musicians

- Tomotaka Ishikawa (石川和智) - drums (2022-present)
- Yukiko Shibutani (渋谷有希子) - bass, backing vocals (2024-present)
- Billion Kawashima - percussion (2024-present)
- Million Kawashima - trumpet, trombone, backing vocals (2024-present)

Former

- Kazuki Ozeki (尾関和樹) – drums (1989)
- Shinichi Ishikawa (石川慎一) – guitars (1992–2014)
- You Oshima (大島雄一) – guitars (2014–2021)
- Junichi Harashima (原島淳一) – drums (2004–2021)
- Satoshi Fujinami (藤波聡) – bass (2004–2021), drums (1992–2004, 2008, с2015), guitar (1989–1992, 2008, с 2015)

== Discography ==
The band's major releases follow an acrostic pattern of the word "SIGH" repeated: Scorn Defeat, Infidel Art, Ghastly Funeral Theatre, Hail Horror Hail, and so on.

Studio albums

- Scorn Defeat (嘲笑敗北) (1993)
- Infidel Art (異端芸術) (1995)
- Hail Horror Hail (恐怖万歲) (1997)
- Scenario IV: Dread Dreams (第四之凶夢) (1999)
- Imaginary Sonicscape (架空音景) (2001)
- Gallows Gallery (2005)
- Hangman's Hymn (音楽による葬式) (2007)
- Scenes from Hell (2010)
- In Somniphobia (2012)
- Graveward (2015)
- Heir to Despair (絶望を受け継ぐもの) (2018)
- Shiki (2022)
- I Saw the World's End – Hangman's Hymn MMXXV (2025)
- Goh-Ka (2026)

Live albums

- The Eastern Force of Evil: Live '92-'96 (1997)
- Scorn Defeat 20th Anniversary Gig (2013)
- Live: The Eastern Forces of Evil 2022 (2023)

Compilation albums

- Eastern Darkness (極東の闇) (2021)

EPs

- Requiem for Fools (1992)
- Ghastly Funeral Theatre (葬式劇場) (1997)
- A Tribute to Venom (2008)
- The Curse of Izanagi 7" (2010)

Demos

- Desolation (1990)
- Tragedies (1990)
