= From Beyond (Massacre album) =

Studio album by Massacre
- Released: July 1, 1991
- Recorded: March 1991; Morrisound Recording, Tampa, Florida
- Genre: Death metal
- Length: 38:20
- Label: Earache
- Producers: Colin Richardson; Massacre

Massacre chronology
From Beyond (1991)	Inhuman Condition (1992)

From Beyond is the debut studio album by American death metal band Massacre, released in 1991 on Earache Records. The album was re-released with a different cover (original is red) and the Inhuman Condition EP as bonus tracks.

The album's title is based on H. P. Lovecraft's the short story of the same name.

== Background and recording ==
The album was recorded in March 1991 at Morrisound Recording in Tampa, Florida.

== Music ==
AllMusic describes the album's sound as "a cross between Mercyful Fate and Death." The album makes use of the double tracking audio recording technique on Kam Lee's vocals.

"Corpsegrinder" was originally recorded by the band Death, of which all members of Massacre have been a part in the past.

== Artwork ==
The cover art was painted by Ed Repka. The band's vocalist, Kam Lee, hates the original pink album cover art done by Ed Repka and the changing of the band logo as he claims it "looks like the Superman logo."

== Critical reception ==
Professional ratings
Review scores
Source	Rating
AllMusic	4.5/5 stars
Rock Hard	9.5/10

AllMusic gave the album four and a half stars out of five, and wrote: "The deadliest of death-metal always comes from Florida, and this is no exception."

In 2005, From Beyond was ranked number 288 in Rock Hard magazine's book The 500 Greatest Rock & Metal Albums of All Time.

== Track listing ==
All lyrics written by Kam Lee, all music by Rick Rozz, unless stated.

No.	Title	Length
1.	"Dawn of Eternity"	5:12
2.	"Cryptic Realms"	4:52
3.	"Biohazard"	4:41
4.	"Chamber of Ages"	4:50
5.	"From Beyond"	4:28
6.	"Defeat Remains"	4:17
7.	"Succubus"	3:02
8.	"Symbolic Immortality"	3:39
9.	"Corpsegrinder" (Death cover)	3:19

The original vinyl release had a bonus 7" single:

No.	Title	Length
10.	"Provoked Accurser"	4:48

Some reissues include the Inhuman Condition EP:

No.	Title	Length
10.	"Inhuman Condition"	5:37
11.	"Plains of Insanity"	4:46
12.	"Warhead" (Venom cover)	5:12
13.	"Provoked Accuser"	4:52

== Personnel ==
Massacre

- Kam Lee – vocals
- Rick Rozz – guitar
- Terry Butler – bass
- Bill Andrews – drums

Additional musicians

- Walter Trachsler – rhythm guitar (uncredited)

Production

- Colin Richardson and Massacre – production
- Scott Burns – engineering
- Edward J. Repka – artwork and logo

According to Mike Borders, Robby Goodwin wrote the song "Biohazard" but was not credited.
