= Leprosy (album) =

Studio album by Death
- Released: August 12, 1988 (US); November 16, 1988 (Europe)
- Recorded: April 1988
- Studios: Morrisound Recording, Tampa, Florida
- Genre: Death metal
- Length: 38:37
- Label: Combat
- Producer: Dan Johnson

Death chronology
Scream Bloody Gore (1987)	Leprosy (1988)	Spiritual Healing (1990)

Leprosy is the second studio album by American death metal band Death, released on August 12, 1988, by Combat Records. The album is notable in its different tone and quality from the band's debut album Scream Bloody Gore (1987), and is the first example of producer and engineer Scott Burns' work heard on many of the death metal and grindcore albums of that era.

It is also the first Death album to feature drummer Bill Andrews, and is the band's only studio album to feature guitarist Rick Rozz.

Shaun Lindsley of Metal Hammer said "with Scream Bloody Gore having set a new standard in extremity, [...] Leprosy would end up being the final nail in Death's thrash-tinged coffin." It is considered to be a groundbreaking achievement in the genre, and was voted the 64th best Hard Rock or Metal album of the 80s by Loudwire.

== Background ==
After releasing their debut album Scream Bloody Gore, the band cancelled a planned tour after rehearsing with Steve Di Giorgio of Sadus in Concord. Chuck Schuldiner then returned to Florida and recruited his former bandmate Rick Rozz, along with his bandmates in Massacre, Terry Butler and Bill Andrews.

== Music and lyrics ==
=== Musical style and instrumentation ===
Leprosy has been described as sounding "raw", "raucous" and "just absolutely pissed off". Invisible Oranges described the album as sounding "softer" than Scream Bloody Gore and "not as technical" as Spiritual Healing, the album that followed." Scott Burns' production on the album has been described as "unfussy" and "organic", and musically, it has been said to retain the "morbid inertia" of its predecessor. It is considered the band's final "straightforward" death metal release, as they would take a more technical and progressive approach on later releases.

The songwriting on the album has been called "structurally audacious." Jonathan Horsley of MusicRadar assessed, "Even this early in his [career], Schuldiner was a provocateur, upending the songwriting rule book, eschewing repetition, operating like the editor of an action movie in cutting together contrasting riffs and ideas with brutal efficiency." The lead guitar stylings of Rick Rozz on the album utilize whammy bar divebombs, drawing comparisons to Kerry King of Slayer. By contrast, Chuck Schuldiner’s guitar solos on the album have been described as "more technical". Some of the album's guitar riffs have been described as melodic, with some publications noting influence from the New wave of British heavy metal.

=== Lyrical themes ===
The lyrical content on Leprosy has been said to be more mature, darker and more "bleak" than its predecessor, Scream Bloody Gore. Author Jeremy Wagner described the album as "eight tracks of miserable fates and sobering nightmares," and went as far as to call the album's themes "abysmal" and "pure horror". While Scream Bloody Gore contained lyrics pertaining to fictional subject matter such as zombies, Leprosy saw Schuldiner beginning to explore nonfictional topics in his lyrics as well. Topics explored by Schuldiner on the album have been described as "more psychologically unnerving", and include social stigma, war, and existential dread. "Pull the Plug" is written from the perspective of a person who is being taken off of life support, and has been called "a death metal contemporary of Metallica’s One".

== Artwork ==
The album's cover artwork has been described as exhibiting a "robed and goulish figure riddled with skin lesions and tissue loss." Author Jeremy Wagner stated that the album cover gave him "an immediate impression of heaviness and unease." Joe DiVita of Loudwire said the artwork "might be the scariest thing to be dominated by pink hues with the hooded leper pulling a piece of cloth over his malformed face."

== Reception and legacy ==
Professional ratings
Review scores
Source	Rating
AllMusic	3/5 stars
Collector's Guide to Heavy Metal	4/10
Metal Storm	9.7/10

Released in 1988, Leprosy is considered to be ahead of its time musically, and a groundbreaking achievement in the genre. The staff of Loudwire wrote, "In regards to the ‘80s, not much was more extreme than the brutal savagery of Leprosy." According to Eduardo Rivadavia of Loudwire, the album made it apparent that the death metal genre was "already advancing by leaps and bounds." Jonathan Horsley of Guitar World wrote, "There is an argument to be said that, of all the great death metal bands, Death were the least heavy. [But,] if Leprosy is not the heaviest death metal guitar album, it’s possibly the gnarliest, worthy of Ed Repka’s career-best cover art, and essential listening."

In a poll by the German Rock Hard magazine, Leprosy was voted the number one of the 25 most important death metal albums of all time. On April 29, 2014, a three-disc remastered edition containing bonus tracks was released via Relapse Records.

The title track was covered by the blackened death metal band Akercocke on their 2007 album Antichrist. Dutch melodic death metal band Callenish Circle covered "Pull the Plug" as a bonus on their Flesh Power Dominion album, released in 2002; shortly thereafter, Norwegian band Zyklon also recorded "Pull the Plug" to be used as a bonus track. Finnish thrash metal band Mokoma covered the track "Open Casket", with lyrics in Finnish and titled "Avoin Hauta", on their EP Viides Vuodenaika. "Pull the Plug" was also covered by American band Revocation.

The album cover is featured in Metal: A Headbanger's Journey.

In 2013, author Ian Christe wrote: "Now, twenty-five years and twenty-five thousand death metal bands later, Leprosy sounds almost normal. The essence of these cries has echoed with a tormented dimension all along. As you breathe the rotten scent, try not to go insane with awe that Death's early brilliant depravity could change the world so completely. Leprosy proved that this death metal shit was for real, and today it has become inescapable."

In 2024, Joe DiVita of Loudwire named the album's cover artwork as one of the "31 Scariest Metal Album Covers of All Time".

== Track listing ==
All music written by Chuck Schuldiner and Rick Rozz, unless stated. All lyrics written by Chuck Schuldiner. All songs published by Mutilation Music.

No.	Title	Music	Length
1.	"Leprosy"	Schuldiner	6:19
2.	"Born Dead"		3:25
3.	"Forgotten Past"		4:33
4.	"Left to Die"		4:35
5.	"Pull the Plug"	Schuldiner	4:25
6.	"Open Casket"		4:53
7.	"Primitive Ways"	Rozz	4:33
8.	"Choke on It"		5:54
Total length:			38:37

2008 Century Media remastered digipak version
No.	Title	Length
9.	"Open Casket" (live)	4:49
10.	"Choke on It" (live)	5:50
11.	"Left to Die" (live)	4:35
12.	"Pull the Plug" (live)	4:26
13.	"Forgotten Past" (live)	4:33

2014 reissued Relapse Records version (bonus disc 1)
No.	Title	Length
1.	"Open Casket" (Rehearsals September 23, 1987)	4:55
2.	"Choke on It" (Rehearsals September 23, 1987)	6:15
3.	"Left to Die" (Rehearsals September 23, 1987)	4:41
4.	"Left to Die - Take 2" (Rehearsals September 23, 1987)	4:34
5.	"Left to Die" (Rehearsals May 12, 1987)	4:27
6.	"Open Casket" (Rehearsals May 12, 1987)	4:42
7.	"Pull the Plug" (Rehearsals May 12, 1987)	4:17
8.	"Choke on It" (Rehearsals May 12, 1987)	5:37
9.	"Born Dead" (Rehearsals May 12, 1987)	3:19
10.	"Forgotten Past" (Rehearsals May 12, 1987)	4:26

2014 reissued Relapse Records version (bonus disc 2)
No.	Title	Length
1.	"Leprosy" (Live at Backstreets, Rochester, NY - December 13, 1988)	6:24
2.	"Open Casket" (Live at Backstreets, Rochester, NY - December 13, 1988)	4:59
3.	"Zombie Ritual" (Live at Backstreets, Rochester, NY - December 13, 1988)	4:40
4.	"Pull the Plug" (Live at Backstreets, Rochester, NY - December 13, 1988)	4:20
5.	"Left to Die" (Live at Backstreets, Rochester, NY - December 13, 1988)	4:41
6.	"Mutilation" (Live at Backstreets, Rochester, NY - December 13, 1988)	3:40
7.	"Forgotten Past" (Live at Backstreets, Rochester, NY - December 13, 1988)	4:35
8.	"Born Dead" (Live at Backstreets, Rochester, NY - December 13, 1988)	3:23
9.	"Denial of Life" (Live at Backstreets, Rochester, NY - December 13, 1988)	3:24
10.	"Primitive Ways" (Live at Backstreets, Rochester, NY - December 13, 1988)	4:22
11.	"Infernal Death" (Live at Backstreets, Rochester, NY - December 13, 1988)	4:21
12.	"Leprosy" (Live at The Dirt Club, Bloomfield, NJ - December 11, 1988)	7:29
13.	"Pull the Plug" (Live at The Dirt Club, Bloomfield, NJ - December 11, 1988)	4:43
14.	"Forgotten Past" (Live at The Dirt Club, Bloomfield, NJ - December 11, 1988)	4:51
15.	"Primitive Ways" (Live at The Dirt Club, Bloomfield, NJ - December 11, 1988)	4:45
16.	"Open Casket" (Live at The Dirt Club, Bloomfield, NJ - December 11, 1988)	5:09
17.	"Mutilation" (Live at The Dirt Club, Bloomfield, NJ - December 11, 1988)	4:29
18.	"Infernal Death" (Live at The Dirt Club, Bloomfield, NJ - December 11, 1988)	3:31

== Personnel ==
=== Death ===
- Chuck Schuldiner – guitar, vocals, bass
- Rick Rozz – guitar
- Bill Andrews – drums
- Terry Butler – bass (credited but did not play on the album)

=== Production ===
- Dan Johnson – production
- Scott Burns – engineering
- Michael Fuller – mastering
- Edward Repka – artwork
- Frank White – live photos
- J.B. Stapleton – band photo
- David Bett – art direction
- Alan Douches – mastering (2014 reissue)
