= Slayer discography =

Musical artist's discography

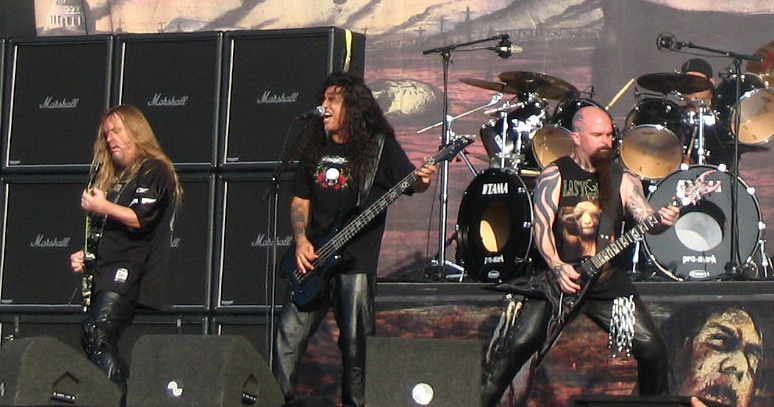
- Slayer at the Fields of Rock in 2007
- Studio albums: 12
- Extended plays: 2
- Live albums: 4
- Singles: 16
- Video albums: 4
- Music videos: 14

Slayer is an American thrash metal band formed in 1981 by guitarists Kerry King and Jeff Hanneman, who recruited vocalist and bassist Tom Araya, and drummer Dave Lombardo. Slayer's first two albums, Show No Mercy (1983) and Hell Awaits (1985), which were released on Metal Blade Records, did not chart in the United States. The band was then signed to Def Jam Recordings by Rick Rubin, who produced Reign in Blood (1986). The album helped Slayer break into the Billboard 200 for the first time, peaking at number 94. After South of Heaven (1988), Slayer signed to Rubin's new label, Def American, and released Seasons in the Abyss (1990). After the album was released, Lombardo departed Slayer and was replaced by Paul Bostaph.

1994's Divine Intervention, the first album to feature Bostaph, peaked at number eight in the US, the band's best chart performance at the time. Diabolus in Musica (1998) was criticized for its nu metal traits, while God Hates Us All (2001) created controversy for its graphic artwork. Bostaph left the band due to an injury and was replaced by former member Lombardo. Christ Illusion (2006) was Slayer's highest debuting effort on the charts, placing at number five in the US and winning two Grammy Awards. Slayer sold 5 million copies in the United States from 1991 to 2013, according to Nielsen SoundScan, and over 20 million worldwide. Slayer is considered one of the "big four" of thrash metal along with Anthrax, Metallica and Megadeth and has earned six gold certifications and one multi-platinum plaque from the Recording Industry Association of America (RIAA).

== Albums ==
=== Studio albums ===
Title	Album details	Peak chart positions											Sales	Certifications
Title	Album details	US	AUS	AUT	DEN	FIN	FRA	GER	NLD	NZ	SWE	UK	Sales	Certifications
Show No Mercy	Released: December 3, 1983; Label: Metal Blade	—	—	—	—	—	—	44	—	—	—	—		
Hell Awaits	Released: April 8, 1985; Label: Metal Blade	—	—	—	—	—	—	41	—	—	—	—	US: 100,000	
Reign in Blood	Released: October 20, 1986; Label: Def Jam	94	—	—	—	—	—	—	—	—	—	47	US: 766,000	RIAA: Gold; BPI: Silver
South of Heaven	Released: July 5, 1988; Label: Def Jam	57	53	—	—	11	—	23	31	—	50	25		RIAA: Gold; BPI: Silver; MC: Gold
Seasons in the Abyss	Released: October 9, 1990; Label: Def American	40	58	29	—	12	—	19	69	—	47	18	US: 813,000	RIAA: Gold; MC: Gold
Divine Intervention	Released: September 27, 1994; Label: American	8	27	22	—	4	19	18	31	20	10	15		RIAA: Gold; MC: Gold
Undisputed Attitude	Released: May 28, 1996; Label: American	34	16	43	—	27	43	45	33	22	20	31	US: 163,000	
Diabolus in Musica	Released: June 9, 1998; Label: American	31	35	40	—	18	23	32	52	15	29	27	US: 306,000	
God Hates Us All	Released: September 11, 2001; Label: American	28	15	31	32	12	25	9	30	35	18	31	US: 319,000	
Christ Illusion	Released: August 8, 2006; Label: American	5	9	6	14	2	52	2	8	10	4	23	US: 175,000	
World Painted Blood	Released: November 3, 2009; Label: American	12	9	13	21	12	28	7	15	16	21	41	US: 160,000	ZPAV: Gold
Repentless	Released: September 11, 2015; Label: Nuclear Blast	4	3	6	9	3	7	1	2	8	5	11		ZPAV: Gold
"—" denotes a release that did not chart.

=== Live albums ===
Title	Album details	Peak chart positions							
Title	Album details	US	AUS	AUT	FIN	FRA	GER	NLD	UK
Live Undead	Released: November 16, 1984; Label: Metal Blade	—	—	—	—	—	77	—	—
Decade of Aggression	Released: October 22, 1991; Label: Def American	55	83	—	—	—	35	79	29
The Big Four: Live from Sofia, Bulgaria (with Metallica, Megadeth and Anthrax)	Released: October 15, 2010; Label: Universal	—	71	—	31	—	59	75	—
The Repentless Killogy (Live at the Forum in Inglewood, CA)	Released: November 8, 2019; Label: Nuclear Blast	—	—	36	49	91	16	—	—
"—" denotes a release that did not chart.

== EPs ==
Title	EP details	Peak chart positions			
Title	EP details	DEN	FIN	SWE	SWI
Haunting the Chapel	Released: June 1984; Label: Metal Blade	—	—	—	—
Eternal Pyre	Released: June 6, 2006; Label: American	3	2	48	88
"—" denotes a release that did not chart.

== Box sets ==
Title	Album details
Soundtrack to the Apocalypse	Released: November 25, 2003; Label: American
The Vinyl Conflict	Released: October 12, 2010; Label: American, Sony
Hell Awaits (40th Anniversary Edition)	Released: May 15, 2026; Label: Metal Blade

== Singles ==
Song	Year	Peak chart positions			Album
Song	Year	US Sales	DEN	UK	Album
"Black Magic"	1983	—	—	—	Show No Mercy
"Hell Awaits"	1985	—	—	—	Hell Awaits
"Raining Blood"	1986	—	—	64	Reign in Blood
"Angel of Death"	1986	—	—	—	Reign in Blood
"Postmortem"	1986	—	—	—	Reign in Blood
"Necrophobic"	1986	—	—	—	Reign in Blood
"Criminally Insane"	1987	—	—	—	Reign in Blood
"South of Heaven"	1988	—	—	—	South of Heaven
"Mandatory Suicide"	1988	—	—	—	South of Heaven
"War Ensemble"	1990	—	—	—	Seasons in the Abyss
"Dead Skin Mask"	1990	—	—	—	Seasons in the Abyss
"Spirit in Black"	1990	—	—	—	Seasons in the Abyss
"Seasons in the Abyss"	1991	—	—	51	Seasons in the Abyss
"Dittohead"	1994	—	—	—	Divine Intervention
"Serenity in Murder"	1995	—	—	50	Divine Intervention
"I Hate You"	1996	—	—	—	Undisputed Attitude
"Stain of Mind"	1998	—	—	—	Diabolus in Musica
"Bitter Peace"	1998	—	—	—	Diabolus in Musica
"Bloodline"	2001	—	—	—	God Hates Us All
"Disciple"	2001	—	—	—	God Hates Us All
"God Send Death"	2001	—	—	—	God Hates Us All
"Cult"	2006	—	—	—	Christ Illusion
"Eyes of the Insane"	2006	—	15	97	Christ Illusion
"Jihad"	2006	—	—	—	Christ Illusion
"Final Six"	2007	—	—	—	Christ Illusion
"Psychopathy Red"	2009	—	—	—	World Painted Blood
"Hate Worldwide"	2009	2	—	—	World Painted Blood
"World Painted Blood"	2010	14	—	—	World Painted Blood
"Implode"	2014	—	—	—	Repentless
"When the Stillness Comes"	2015	—	—	—	Repentless
"Repentless"	2015	2	—	—	Repentless
"You Against You"	2016	—	—	—	Repentless
"Pride in Prejudice"	2016	—	—	—	Repentless
"—" denotes a release that did not chart.

== Other appearances ==
Song	Year	Album	Comments
"Captor of Sin"	1986	River's Edge soundtrack	Originally appears on Haunting the Chapel.
"Tormentor"	1986	River's Edge soundtrack	Originally appears on Show No Mercy.
"Evil Has No Boundaries"	1986	River's Edge soundtrack	Originally appears on Show No Mercy.
"Die by the Sword"	1986	River's Edge soundtrack	Originally appears on Show No Mercy.
"In-A-Gadda-Da-Vida"	1987	Less than Zero soundtrack	Iron Butterfly cover. Later appears on Soundtrack to the Apocalypse.
"Angel of Death"	1990	Gremlins 2: The New Batch soundtrack	Originally appears on Reign in Blood.
"Disorder"	1993	Judgement Night soundtrack	Collaboration with Ice-T. Medley and Covered of songs by The Exploited. Later appears on Soundtrack to the Apocalypse.
"Epidemic"	1996	The Perfect Woman soundtrack	Originally appears on Reign in Blood.
"No Remorse (I Wanna Die)"	1997	Spawn: The Album	Collaboration with Atari Teenage Riot. Later appears on Soundtrack to the Apocalypse.
"Human Disease"	1998	Bride of Chucky soundtrack	Later appears on Soundtrack to the Apocalypse.
"Here Comes the Pain"	1999	WCW Mayhem: The Music	Appears on God Hates Us All.
"Hand of Doom"	2000	Nativity in Black II	Black Sabbath cover.
"Spirit in Black"	2000	Book of Shadows: Blair Witch 2	Originally Appears on Seasons in the Abyss.
"Bloodline"	2000	Dracula 2000 soundtrack	Later appears on God Hates Us All.
"Angel of Death"	2000	Mrs. Death 2: Hells Fury soundtrack	Originally appears on Reign in Blood
"Born to Be Wild"	2002	NASCAR: Crank It Up	Steppenwolf cover.
"Angel of Death"	2002	Jackass: The Movie soundtrack	Originally appears on Reign in Blood.
"Divine Intervention"	2003	Haggard: The Movie soundtrack	Originally appears on Divine Intervention.
"Warzone"	2004	UFC: Ultimate Beat Downs, Vol. 1	Originally appears on God Hates Us All.
"Spill the Blood"	2006	Jackass Number Two soundtrack	Originally appears on South of Heaven.
"Eyes of the Insane"	2006	Saw III soundtrack	Originally appears on Christ Illusion.
"Raining Blood"	2007	Guitar Hero 3: Legends of Rock	Originally appears on Reign in Blood.
"Raining Blood"	2007	Skate	Originally appears on Reign in Blood.
"Final Six"	2008	Punisher: War Zone soundtrack	Originally appears on the special edition of Christ Illusion.
"Raining Blood"	2009	Guitar Hero Smash Hits	Originally appears on Reign in Blood. Has a different mix compared to the Guitar Hero III: Legends of Rock release.
"War Ensemble"	2009	Guitar Hero: Metallica	Originally appears on Seasons in the Abyss.
"Chemical Warfare"	2010	Guitar Hero: Warriors of Rock	Originally appears on Haunting the Chapel.
"War Ensemble"	2013	Rocksmith 2014	Originally appears on Seasons in the Abyss.
"Angel of Death"	2015	Rocksmith 2014	Originally appears on Reign in Blood.
"Raining Blood"	2015	Rocksmith 2014	Originally appears on Reign in Blood.
"South of Heaven"	2015	Rocksmith 2014	Originally appears on South of Heaven.
"Seasons in the Abyss"	2015	Rocksmith 2014	Originally appears on Seasons in the Abyss.
"Dead Skin Mask"	2015	Rocksmith 2014	Originally appears on Seasons in the Abyss.
"Angel of Death"	2019	Rock Band 4 DLC	Originally appears on Reign in Blood.

== Videos ==
=== Music videos ===
Song	Year	Director	Album
"War Ensemble"	1990		Seasons In The Abyss
"Seasons in the Abyss"	1991	Di Puglia Gerard	Seasons In The Abyss
"Serenity in Murder"	1994	Jon Reiss	Divine Intervention
"Dittohead"	1994	Jon Reiss	Divine Intervention
"I Hate You"	1996	Josh Taft	Undisputed Attitude
"Stain of Mind"	1998		Diabolus In Musica
"Bloodline"	2001	Evan Bernard	God Hates Us All
"Eyes of the Insane"	2006	Tony Petrossian	Christ Illusion
"Beauty Through Order"	2010	Ben Hibon	World Painted Blood
"World Painted Blood"	2010	Mark Brooks	World Painted Blood
"Repentless"	2015	BJ Mcdonnell	Repentless
"You Against You"	2016	BJ Mcdonnell	Repentless
"Pride In Prejudice"	2016	BJ Mcdonnell	Repentless

=== Video albums ===
Title	Album details	Peak chart positions										Certifications
Title	Album details	US Video	AUS	AUT	FIN	GER	JPN	NLD	NZ	SWI	UK	Certifications
Live Intrusion	Released: October 31, 1995; Label: American	1	3	—	3	—	—	—	—	—	3	
War at the Warfield	Released: July 29, 2003; Label: American	3	13	—	2	58	—	—	—	—	5	RIAA: Gold
Still Reigning	Released: October 26, 2004; Label: American	7	7	—	7	—	—	—	—	—	14	RIAA: Gold
The Unholy Alliance Live (with Lamb of God, Mastodon, Children of Bodom, and Thine Eyes Bleed)	Released: October 30, 2007; Label: American	—	14	—	—	—	—	—	—	—	—	ARIA: Gold
The Big 4 Live From Sofia, Bulgaria (with Metallica, Megadeth and Anthrax)	Released: October 15, 2010; Label: Universal	1	1	1	1	4	6	7	1	3	1	RIAA: 2× Platinum; ARIA: 2× Platinum; BVMI: Gold; RMNZ: Gold
"—" denotes a release that did not chart.
