= The Vinyl Conflict =

Box set by Slayer
- Released: October 12, 2010
- Recorded: 1986–2008
- Genre: Thrash metal
- Labels: American, Nuclear Blast Records
- Producers: Rick Rubin; Slayer; Dave Sardy; Matt Hyde; Josh Abraham; Greg Fidelman

Slayer chronology
World Painted Blood (2009)	The Vinyl Conflict (2010)	The Big Four: Live from Sofia, Bulgaria (2010)

The Vinyl Conflict is a box set by the thrash metal band Slayer, released October 12, 2010. It includes all ten of Slayer's studio albums since 1986 and their 1991 live album Decade of Aggression. The idea of releasing a second box set was made public in August 2010. It was first released with a price of $199.99. The albums are all in vinyl and are remastered. It received generally positive reception from critics.

== Conception ==
In August 2010, it was announced that band would be releasing a second box set after Soundtrack to the Apocalypse (2003), and would include every one of Slayer's studio albums from 1986's Reign In Blood to 2009's World Painted Blood. It originally had a price tag of $199.99, but is now sold at retail price of $149.98. It was released through American Recordings and Sony. Blabbermouth.net noted that they are "treating the albums the way they would treat a great jazz, classical, Bob Dylan or Miles Davis record, something that isn't normally done for metal records." To increase quality, lacquers were cut several times, and the original albums were remastered. It was released as a high-quality 180 gram audiophile vinyl, pressed at RTI, an American pressing plant. The vinyl discs are packaged in a standard, clear inner sleeve to preserve the vinyl, and are also in high-quality litho-wrapped jackets, and boxed in a slipcase. Reproductions of the original albums inner sleeve artwork were converted to 12 inch square inserts to fit the standard vinyl disc covers.

Adam Farber of Sony Music Entertainment explained: "The vinyl box is a real treat for fans, especially with today's renewed and increased interest in vinyl." It is the first time that ten of Slayer's studio albums have been mass-produced on vinyl. Dino Paredes of American Recordings relates: "It's been years and years since the Slayer vinyl has been in print — only the two most recent albums are currently available on vinyl, the rest have been out of print for years and very hard to find. These albums sound spectacular — they sound like you've never heard them before. Everything about 'The Vinyl Conflict' — the look of it, the feel of it — is very strong, very powerful, very Slayer, from the music to the dripping, bloody pentagram on the front of the box. It's perfect."

== Reception ==
John Kosik of the Associated Press criticized its price, stating: "For $200, casual fans may want to steer clear." Kosik also said that what it "offers the hard-core listener goes beyond the distinct romance of vinyl's warm, earthy sound." Bob Gendron of TONEAudio wrote that the box set was a "godsend" and also said that they were "amazingly produced LPs that bring to life several of the greatest metal records ever made…" Guitar World praised the box set for its mastering, saying the benefits of the treatment "are immediately clear when you drop the needle onto one of these babies. Basically all the songs Slayer fans lose their mind over are here, sounding heavier, livelier and more brutal than ever." He also said that the remastering made a listener want to thoroughly listen to the music.

== Album listings ==
=== Reign in Blood ===
Side 1
No.	Title	Lyrics	Music	Length
1.	"Angel of Death"	Jeff Hanneman	Hanneman	4:51
2.	"Piece by Piece"	Kerry King	King	2:03
3.	"Necrophobic"	Hanneman, King	Hanneman, King	1:40
4.	"Altar of Sacrifice"	King	Hanneman	2:50
5.	"Jesus Saves"	King	Hanneman, King	2:54

Side 2
No.	Title	Lyrics	Music	Length
6.	"Criminally Insane"	Hanneman, King	Hanneman, King	2:23
7.	"Reborn"	King	Hanneman	2:12
8.	"Epidemic"	King	Hanneman, King	2:23
9.	"Postmortem"	Hanneman	Hanneman	3:27
10.	"Raining Blood"	Hanneman, King	Hanneman	4:17

=== South of Heaven ===
Side 1
No.	Title	Writer(s)	Length
1.	"South of Heaven"	Tom Araya (lyrics); Jeff Hanneman (music)	4:58
2.	"Silent Scream"	Araya (lyrics); Hanneman (music); Kerry King (music)	3:07
3.	"Live Undead"	Araya (lyrics); King (lyrics); Hanneman (music)	3:50
4.	"Behind the Crooked Cross"	Hanneman	3:15
5.	"Mandatory Suicide"	Araya (lyrics); Hanneman (music); King (music)	4:05

Side 2
No.	Title	Writer(s)	Length
6.	"Ghosts of War"	King (lyrics & music); Hanneman (music)	3:53
7.	"Read Between the Lies"	Araya (lyrics); King (lyrics); Hanneman (music)	3:20
8.	"Cleanse the Soul"	Araya (lyrics); King (lyrics); Hanneman (music)	3:02
9.	"Dissident Aggressor" (Judas Priest cover)	Glenn Tipton; Rob Halford; K. K. Downing	2:35
10.	"Spill the Blood"	Hanneman	4:49

=== Seasons in the Abyss ===
Side 1
No.	Title	Lyrics	Music	Length
1.	"War Ensemble"	Tom Araya, Jeff Hanneman	Hanneman	4:51
2.	"Blood Red"	Araya	Hanneman	2:47
3.	"Spirit in Black"	Kerry King	Hanneman	4:07
4.	"Expendable Youth"	Araya	King	4:09
5.	"Dead Skin Mask"	Araya	Hanneman	5:20

Side 2
No.	Title	Lyrics	Music	Length
6.	"Hallowed Point"	Araya, Hanneman	Hanneman, King	3:23
7.	"Skeletons of Society"	King	King	4:40
8.	"Temptation"	King	King	3:25
9.	"Born of Fire"	King	Hanneman, King	3:07
10.	"Seasons in the Abyss"	Araya	Hanneman	6:38

=== Decade of Aggression ===
Decade of Aggression (Part 1)
No.	Title	Lyrics	Music	Length
1.	"Hell Awaits"	Kerry King	Jeff Hanneman, King	6:50
2.	"The Antichrist"	Hanneman	Hanneman, King	3:50
3.	"War Ensemble"	Hanneman, Tom Araya	Hanneman	4:58
4.	"South of Heaven"	Araya	Hanneman	4:25
5.	"Raining Blood"	Hanneman, King	Hanneman	2:32
6.	"Altar of Sacrifice"	King	Hanneman	2:48
7.	"Jesus Saves"	King	Hanneman, King	4:12
8.	"Dead Skin Mask"	Araya	Hanneman	4:58
9.	"Seasons in the Abyss"	Araya	Hanneman	7:01
10.	"Mandatory Suicide"	Araya	Hanneman, King	4:00
11.	"Angel of Death"	Hanneman	Hanneman	4:52

Decade of Aggression (Part 2)
No.	Title	Lyrics	Music	Length
1.	"Hallowed Point"	Hanneman, Araya	Hanneman, King	3:36
2.	"Blood Red"	Araya	Hanneman	2:50
3.	"Die by the Sword"	Hanneman	Hanneman	3:35
4.	"Black Magic"	King	Hanneman, King	3:28
5.	"Captor of Sin"	Hanneman, King	Hanneman, King	3:34
6.	"Born of Fire"	King	Hanneman, King	3:03
7.	"Postmortem"	Hanneman	Hanneman	4:04
8.	"Spirit in Black"	King	Hanneman	4:07
9.	"Expendable Youth"	Araya	King	4:36
10.	"Chemical Warfare"	Hanneman, King	Hanneman, King	5:30

=== Divine Intervention ===
This Side
No.	Title	Lyrics	Music	Length
1.	"Killing Fields"	Tom Araya	Kerry King	3:57
2.	"Sex. Murder. Art."	Araya	King	1:50
3.	"Fictional Reality"	King	King	3:38
4.	"Dittohead"	King	King	2:31
5.	"Divine Intervention"	Araya, Paul Bostaph, Jeff Hanneman, King	Hanneman, King	5:33

Other Side
No.	Title	Lyrics	Music	Length
6.	"Circle of Beliefs"	King	King	4:30
7.	"SS-3"	Hanneman	Hanneman, King	4:07
8.	"Serenity in Murder"	Araya	Hanneman, King	2:36
9.	"213"	Araya	Hanneman	4:52
10.	"Mind Control"	Araya, King	Hanneman, King	3:04

=== Undisputed Attitude ===
Side A
No.	Title	Writer(s)	Original artist	Length
1.	"Disintegration" "Free Money"	Eric Mastrokalos, Brett Dodwell, Roy Hansen	Verbal Abuse	1:41
2.	"Verbal Abuse" "Leeches"	Mastrokalos, Dodwell, Hansen	Verbal Abuse	1:58
3.	"Abolish Government" "Superficial Love"	Todd Barnes, Ron Emory, Jack Grisham, Mike Roche	T.S.O.L.	1:48
4.	"Can't Stand You"	Jeff Hanneman	Pap Smear	1:27
5.	"Ddamm"	Hanneman	Pap Smear	1:01
6.	"Guilty of Being White"	Brian Baker, Jeff Nelson, Ian MacKaye, Lyle Preslar	Minor Threat	1:07
7.	"I Hate You"	Mastrokalos, Dodwell, Hansen	Verbal Abuse	2:16
8.	"Filler" "I Don't Want to Hear It"	Baker, Nelson, MacKaye, Preslar	Minor Threat	2:28
9.	"Spiritual Law"	Casey Royer, Rikk Agnew, John Calabro	D.I.	3:00

Side B
No.	Title	Writer(s)	Original artist	Length
10.	"Mr. Freeze"	Kyle Toucher	Dr. Know	2:24
11.	"Violent Pacification"	Spike Cassidy, Kurt Brecht	D.R.I.	2:38
12.	"Richard Hung Himself"	Royer, Fred Traccone	D.I.	3:22
13.	"I'm Gonna Be Your God" (parody tribute of "I Wanna Be Your Dog")	James Osterberg, Ron Asheton, Scott Asheton, David Alexander	The Stooges	2:58
14.	"Gemini"	Kerry King (music), Tom Araya (lyrics)	Slayer	4:53

=== Diabolus in Musica ===
Side 1
No.	Title	Lyrics	Music	Length
1.	"Bitter Peace"	Jeff Hanneman	Hanneman	4:32
2.	"Death's Head"	Hanneman	Hanneman	3:34
3.	"Stain of Mind"	Kerry King	Hanneman	3:24
4.	"Overt Enemy"	Hanneman	Hanneman	4:41
5.	"Perversions of Pain"	King	Hanneman	3:33
6.	"Love to Hate"	Hanneman, King	Hanneman	3:07

Side 2
No.	Title	Lyrics	Music	Length
7.	"Desire"	Tom Araya	Hanneman	4:20
8.	"In the Name of God"	King	King	3:40
9.	"Scrum"	King	Hanneman	2:16
10.	"Screaming from the Sky"	Hanneman, King, Araya	Hanneman	3:12
11.	"Point"	King	Hanneman	4:11

=== God Hates Us All ===
Side A
No.	Title	Lyrics	Music	Length
1.	"Darkness of Christ"	Kerry King	Jeff Hanneman	1:30
2.	"Disciple"	King	Hanneman	3:35
3.	"God Send Death"	Tom Araya, Hanneman	Hanneman	3:47
4.	"New Faith"	King	King	3:05
5.	"Cast Down"	King	King	3:26
6.	"Threshold"	King	Hanneman	2:29
7.	"Exile"	King	King	3:55

Side B
No.	Title	Lyrics	Music	Length
8.	"Seven Faces"	King	King	3:41
9.	"Bloodline"	Araya, Hanneman	Hanneman, King	3:36
10.	"Deviance"	Araya, Hanneman	Hanneman	3:08
11.	"War Zone"	King	King	2:45
12.	"Here Comes the Pain"	King	King	3:29
13.	"Payback"	King	King	3:05

=== Christ Illusion ===
Side 1
No.	Title	Lyrics	Music	Length
1.	"Flesh Storm"	Kerry King	King	4:14
2.	"Catalyst"	King	King	3:07
3.	"Skeleton Christ"	King	King	4:22
4.	"Eyes of the Insane"	Tom Araya	Jeff Hanneman	3:29
5.	"Jihad"	Hanneman, Araya	Hanneman	3:32

Side 2
No.	Title	Lyrics	Music	Length
6.	"Consfearacy"	King	King	3:06
7.	"Catatonic"	King	King	4:53
8.	"Black Serenade" (Alternate Version)	Araya, Hanneman	Hanneman	2:58
9.	"Cult"	King	King	4:39
10.	"Supremist"	King	King	3:51
11.	"Final Six"	Araya, Hanneman	Araya, Hanneman	4:10

=== World Painted Blood ===
Side one
No.	Title	Lyrics	Music	Length
1.	"World Painted Blood"	Jeff Hanneman, Tom Araya	Hanneman	5:53
2.	"Unit 731"	Hanneman	Hanneman	2:40
3.	"Snuff"	Kerry King	King	3:42
4.	"Beauty Through Order"	Hanneman, Araya	Hanneman	4:37
5.	"Hate Worldwide"	King	King	2:52

Side two
No.	Title	Lyrics	Music	Length
6.	"Public Display of Dismemberment"	King	King	2:35
7.	"Human Strain"	Hanneman, Araya	Hanneman	3:09
8.	"Americon"	King	King	3:23
9.	"Psychopathy Red"	Hanneman	Hanneman	2:26
10.	"Playing With Dolls"	Hanneman, King, Araya	Hanneman	4:14
11.	"Not of This God"	King	King	4:20
