= Jihad (song) =

2006 song by Slayer

Song by Slayer

from the album Christ Illusion
- Released: August 8, 2006
- Genre: Thrash metal
- Length: 3:32
- Label: American
- Composer: Jeff Hanneman
- Lyricists: Jeff Hanneman; Tom Araya
- Producer: Josh Abraham

"Jihad" is a song by the American thrash metal band Slayer which appears on the band's 2006 studio album Christ Illusion. "Jihad" was primarily written by guitarist Jeff Hanneman; the lyrics were co-authored with vocalist Tom Araya. The song portrays the viewpoint of a terrorist who has participated in the September 11, 2001 attacks, concluding with spoken lyrics taken from words left behind by Mohamed Atta; Atta was named by the FBI as the "head suicide terrorist" of the first plane to crash into the World Trade Center.

Joseph Dias of the Mumbai Christian group "Catholic Secular Forum" expressed concern over "Jihad"'s lyrics, and contributed to Christ Illusion's recall by EMI India, who to date have no plans for a reissue in that country. ABC-TV's Broadcast Standards and Practices Department censored the song during Slayer's first US network television appearance on Jimmy Kimmel Live! on January 19, 2007. Only the opening minute was broadcast over the show's credits, thus omitting 40% of the lyrics. "Jihad" received a mixed reception in the music press, and reviews generally focused on the lyrics' controversial subject matter. The song drew comparisons to Slayer's 1986 track "Angel of Death"—also penned by Hanneman—which similarly caused outrage at the time of its release.

== Origins ==
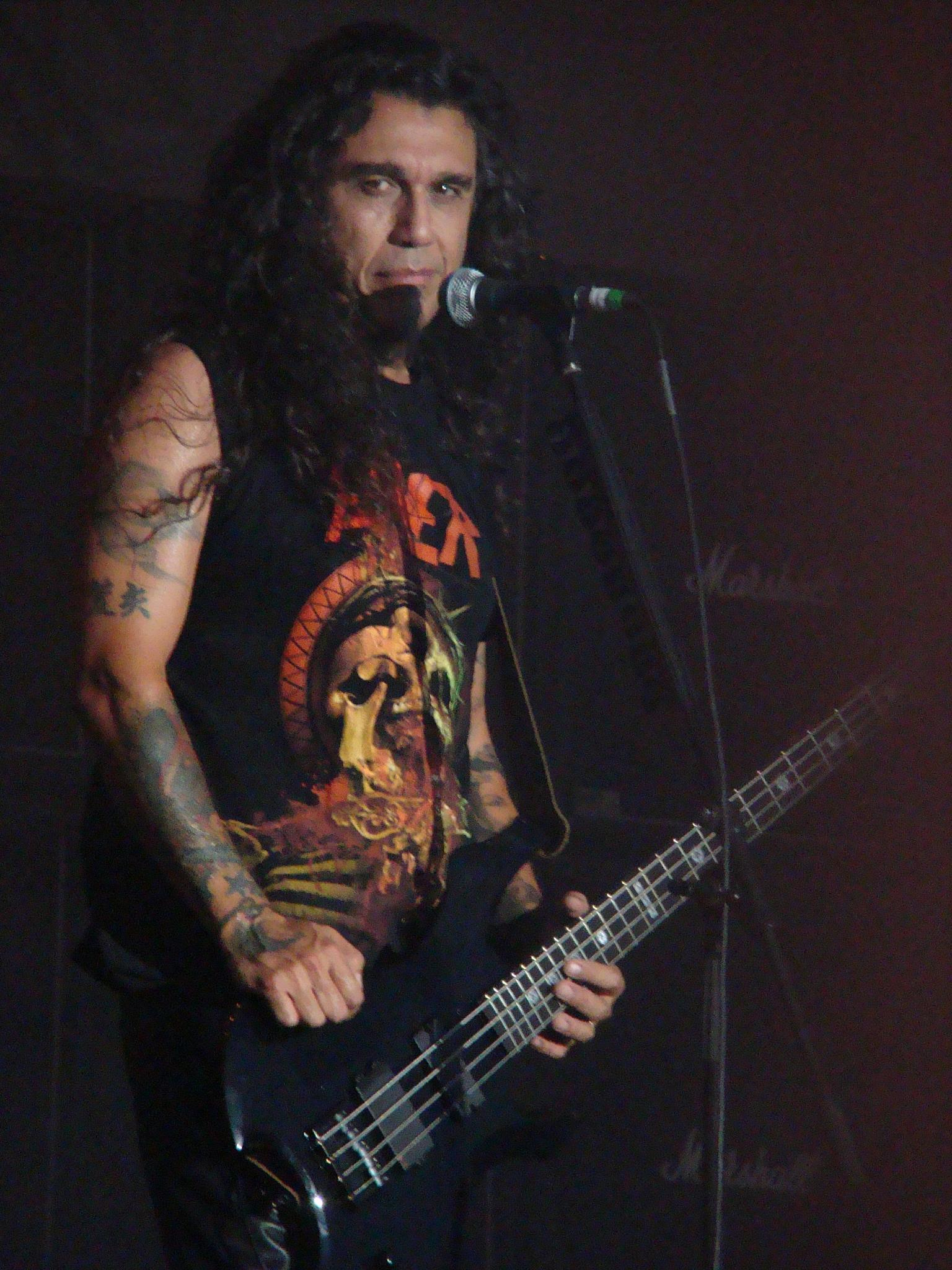
Araya at Gods of Metal 2008

Primarily written by guitarist Jeff Hanneman, "Jihad" features lyrical contributions by vocalist Tom Araya. Both Hanneman and Araya had previously written about controversial lyrical matter in past Slayer tracks; while Hanneman had written songs like "Angel of Death" and "SS-3" which explored the atrocities committed by Nazi figures such as Auschwitz concentration camp physician Josef Mengele and Third Reich henchman Reinhard Heydrich, Araya had delved into the lives of serial killers such as Jeffrey Dahmer and Ed Gein in the tracks "213" and "Dead Skin Mask" respectively. "Jihad" is written from the perspective of a 9/11 terrorist, and imagines the thoughts that "the enemy" might have. The climax of the song features spoken text taken from a motivational letter left behind by Mohamed Atta. Atta was named by the FBI as the head suicide terrorist of American Airlines Flight 11, the first plane to crash into the World Trade Center in the September 11, 2001 attacks.

Guitarist Kerry King has been outspoken in his defense of "Jihad", and has claimed that the song has the "coolest angle" on Christ Illusion. "These new songs aren't political at all," King states, "'Jihad', 'Eyes of the Insane'—it's what's spewing out at us from the TV." He further clarified that the band was not attempting to promote the terrorists' perspective of the war, nor their ideological beliefs, although he expected others to assume Slayer was doing so. They did not wish to dwell on the topic "because every band on the planet already has" and "came from a certain perspective", so felt they had to present an alternative viewpoint. "We're Slayer, we have to be different" was King's assertion.

American singer/songwriter Steve Earle attempted a similar concept in penning "John Walker's Blues" (from the 2002 album Jerusalem), written from the perspective of the Washington-born John Walker Lindh, a Taliban member captured during the 2001 US-led invasion of Afghanistan. Earle was criticised for this track; King anticipated a comparable reaction to "Jihad": "People make an assumption before they (read) the lyrics. It's definitely not only human nature, it's very American-natured."

== Musical structure ==
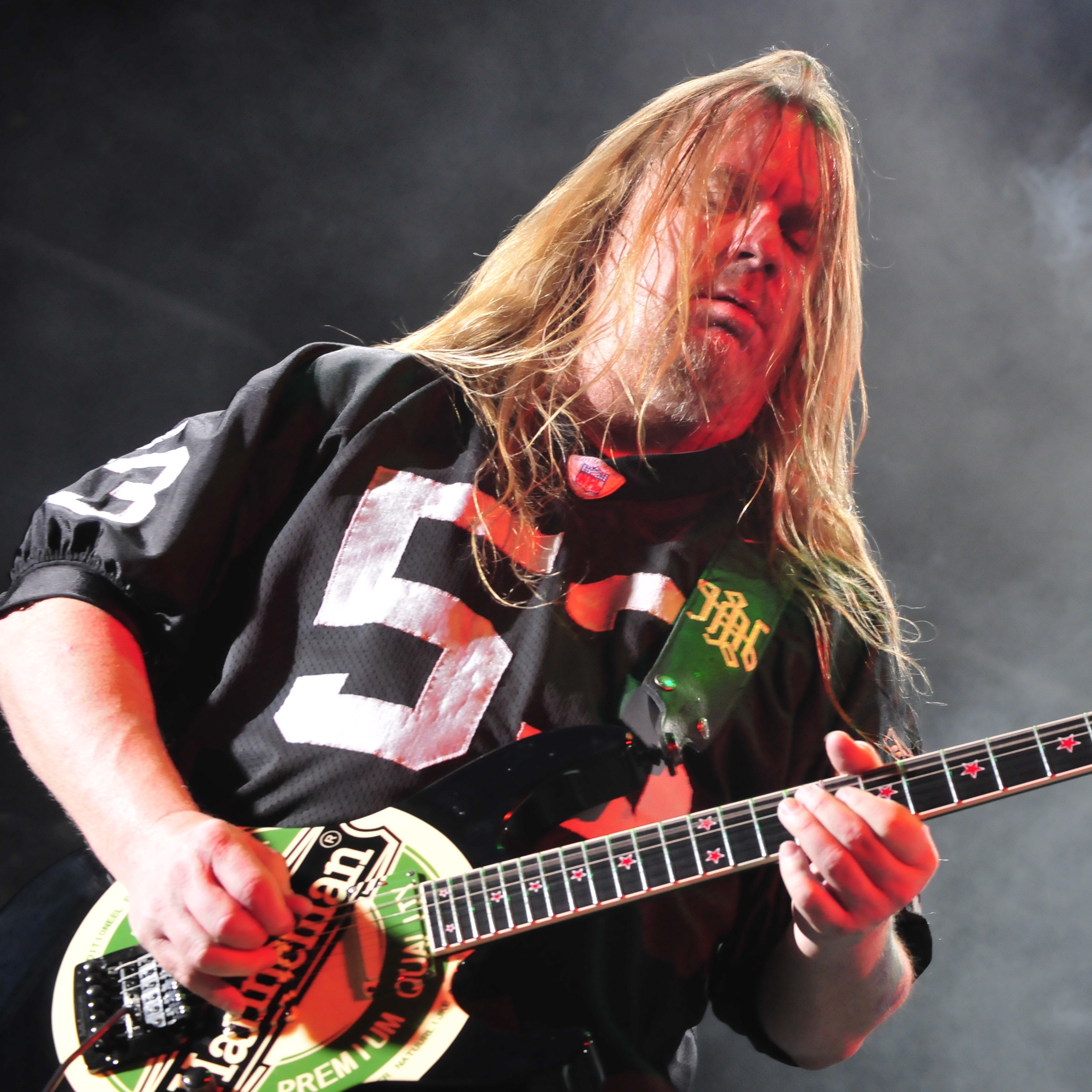
Hanneman performing at Mayhem Festival 2009

"Jihad" is played in standard 4/4 time and runs for 3 minutes and 31 seconds. A skittering vamp played by Jeff Hanneman leads into the track, while Dave Lombardo shimmers his hi-hat. Smoothly mixing up tempos, the band builds the song with a fast, "wonky, catchy and angular" guitar riff reminiscent of the breakdown in 1986's "Angel of Death". This guitar riff decelerates before bursting forward again in two-bar stretches underpinned by Lombardo's pounding, fifth-gear drumming.

IGN reviewer Andy Patrizio was dismissive of the song's musical structure in comparison to the other tracks on Christ Illusion "Jihad", "Flesh Storm", "Skeleton Christ", and "Supremist", and felt there was too much similarity in the riffs, tuning, tempos, and arrangements. MusicOMH.com's Ian Robinson was also negative, remarking that the song "concludes with the 'now getting slightly old hat' Slayer trick (but still atmospheric) of over sampling voices over the solo."

== Reception and criticism ==
"Jihad"—alongside fellow Christ Illusion album tracks "Eyes of the Insane" and "Cult"—was made available for streaming on June 26, 2006, via the Spanish website Rafabasa.com. The album was Slayer's ninth studio recording, and was released on August 8, 2006. During reviews "Jihad" received a mixed reception. Ben Ratliff of New York Times remarked that the song is "predictably tough stuff, but let's put it on a scale. It is tougher, and less reasoned, than Martin Amis's recent short story 'The Last Days of Muhammad Atta.' It is no tougher than a taped message from Al Qaeda."

Peter Atkinson of KNAC.com was equally unimpressed, describing the group's choice of song climax as:

... the same sort of detached, matter-of-fact tactic Hanneman and Araya have employed for "difficult" subjects in the past—Josef Mengele's Nazi atrocities in "Angel of Death" or Jeffrey Dahmer/Ed Gein's ghoulish proclivities in "213" and "Dead Skin Mask"—with great effect. But here it feels atypically crass and exploitative, as if it was done purely to get a rise out of people ... And Slayer's usually a lot more clever than that.

Not all reviews were so negative. Thom Jurek of AllMusic observed that "the band begins to enter and twist and turn looking for a place to create a new rhythmic thrash that's the most insane deconstruction of four/four time on tape." The Austin Chronicle's Marc Savlov asked readers to "listen to the eerie, stop-start cadence of lunacy in 'Jihad,' with Araya playing the role of a suicide bomber almost too convincingly."

King would have appointed "Jihad" as the group's nomination in the Best Metal Performance award category at the 49th Grammy Awards, deeming the chosen track "Eyes of the Insane" "the poorest representations" of the group on ninth studio album Christ Illusion. Despite King's statement, "Eyes of the Insane" won Slayer their first Grammy award. The Slayer guitarist has also stated; "I like playing 'Jihad' because I'm back changing my guitars, and Jeff starts it and he starts it quietly so you can hear the fans go crazy about it and you can't always hear that at the beginning of a song."

=== Controversy ===
"Jihad" (2006)
Slayer enters "Jihad" with a fast, catchy and angular guitar riff reminiscent of the breakdown from 1986's "Angel of Death."

"Jihad"'s lyrical matter provoked controversy from several quarters. Peter Atkinson of KNAC.com remarked that the song, "no doubt will be Christ Illusion's most controversial track." In May 2006, World Entertainment News Network announced that revelations of the song's lyrical content had angered the families of 9/11 victims.

Joseph Dias of the Mumbai Christian group "Catholic Secular Forum" (CSF) issued a memorandum to his police commissioner, in which he expressed concern that "Jihad" would offend "the sensibilities of the Muslims ...and secular Indians who have respect for all faiths." EMI India met with the CSF, apologising for the album's release, and recalled all copies, with no plans for a reissue. On October 11, 2006, it was announced all stocks had been destroyed. The track, alongside the album's controversial Larry Carroll painted cover art and provocative lyrics, were the specific reasons for EMI India's decision. Araya had expected "Jihad"'s treatment of the events of 9/11 to create a backlash in America, however it failed to materialise. This was in part, he believes, because of peoples' view that the song was merely "Slayer being Slayer". Hanneman expected that the Muslim community would either "embrace" or hate Slayer for penning the track, or that the victims of 9/11 would criticize the band over the song's subject matter.

"Jihad" was one of six songs performed by Slayer during their first US network television appearance on ABC-TV's Jimmy Kimmel Live! (January 19, 2007), although only the opening minute of the track was broadcast. ABC-TV's Broadcast Standards and Practices department censored "Jihad", and approached Slayer the day prior to broadcast with roughly 40% of the song lyrics deleted. King has since confirmed that the group were ten minutes from withdrawing from the show, but eventually decided to "just go do it."

=== Comparisons to "Angel of Death" ===
Yeah, that was blown out proportion. People thinking they know what it says without really reading it. And that will happen with every record for everybody, because people like to take an opinion without being informed about anything. It's easier to just shoot your mouth off because the more noise you make the less basis in fact your argument has to be because people are too dumb to recognize the difference.
-Kerry King, KNAC.com

On a number of occasions the song has been compared to "Angel of Death", a Hanneman-penned Slayer track from 1986's Reign in Blood, which was lyrically inspired by Nazi physician Josef Mengele. "Angel of Death" focused on human experiments conducted by Mengele at the Auschwitz concentration camp in World War II. KNAC.com's Peter Atkinson commented upon the similarities, to which King responded that the whole affair "was blown out of proportion".

Making the connection, King remembers thinking "Great, now we're gonna be answering for this one!" after listening to a playback of the song. "But as with 'Angel [of Death],' we're not endorsing anything. It's just not an 'anti' song, either." Hanneman emphasised, "Like 'Angel of Death,' it's just a documentary."

== Personnel ==
Sources:

- Tom Araya – vocals, bass
- Jeff Hanneman – lead guitar
- Kerry King – lead and rhythm guitar
- Dave Lombardo – drums
