= Eyes of the Insane =

2006 single by Slayer

Single by Slayer

from the album Christ Illusion
- Released: November 20, 2006
- Recorded: 2006
- Genre: Thrash metal
- Length: 3:23
- Label: WEA International
- Composer: Jeff Hanneman
- Lyricist: Tom Araya
- Producer: Josh Abraham

Slayer singles chronology
"Cult" (2006)	"Eyes of the Insane" (2006)	"Psychopathy Red" (2009)

"Eyes of the Insane" is a 2006 song by the American thrash metal band Slayer, taken from the band's 2006 album Christ Illusion. The lyrics explore an American soldier's mental anguish following his return home from the second Gulf War, and are based on an article titled "Casualty of War" in Texas Monthly magazine; they were written by vocalist Tom Araya during pre-production for the album. The song was generally well received by critics, and also peaked at No. 15 on the Danish singles chart.

The accompanying music video by the Tehran-born Armenian director Tony Petrossian was recorded in the Los Angeles area in August 2006. The film is presented as a close-up of the soldier's pupil and iris, which reflect disconcerting images of war-themed horrors, flashbacks of his home, wife and children, and ultimately images of his death. "Eyes of the Insane" was used on the soundtrack to Saw III, and won an award for the Best Metal Performance at the 49th Grammy Awards.

== Origins ==
While walking through an airport, vocalist Tom Araya picked up a March 2006 issue of Texas Monthly with a soldier's helmet on the front cover. Seeing the article "Casualty of War", he was interested enough to purchase a copy. The issue explored the involvement of military personnel from Texas in the Iraq War, and included a list of Texan soldiers who had died in the conflict. The feature was accompanied by photographs of some of the dead, while a further article dealt with the anguish of surviving soldiers on their return home. Araya later said the article "blew his mind".

Araya read the article during his flight back to Los Angeles. Pre-production for Slayer's tenth studio album Christ Illusion had just begun, and the band was about to undertake a three-day rehearsal with producer Josh Abraham. Araya left his baggage at the hotel to attend the rehearsals, then returned to re-read the article. Finding it to be "very profound", he woke up in the middle of the night and wrote down the lyrics. He said that his treatment of the topic is "sincere", and that he believes it to be "one that the military doesn't want you to know. They sweep it under the rug, but it's a story that needs to be told." The band's guitarist, Kerry King, has said that "these new songs [from the Christ Illusion album] aren't political at all: 'Jihad', 'Eyes of the Insane' — it's what's spewing out at us from the TV."

== Musical structure ==
"Eyes of the Insane" (2006)
A sample from "Eyes of the Insane", where Dave Lombardo's slow drum pattern opens the track, over which Hanneman and King play angular and descending scales on guitar.

"Eyes of the Insane" is three minutes and 23 seconds long. A slow drum pattern played by Dave Lombardo opens the track, over which Hanneman and King play angular and descending scales on guitar. These guitar riffs evolve from verse to verse, and have been described by Allmusic as "intensely harrowing". The song gradually builds over the course of the verses, refrain and bridge, before resolving with a "towering" chorus.

Some reviewers paid particular attention to Araya's vocal contribution. Zach Hothorn of Prefix magazine said the song "allows Araya to show his vocal range, deepening to build up tension and creating a wonderfully chilling 3 and a half minutes", while Ian Robinson of musicOMH felt the track "is a distinct but welcome change of pace, Dave Lombardo's machine-gun rhythms forming the backbone for Tom Araya's impressively intact scream."

== Music video ==
A screenshot from the music video.

By the time Slayer decided a music video should be filmed, touring commitments prevented their involvement in the actual shoot. Instead, others were contacted to produce the film. Director Tony Petrossian presented Slayer with the first draft, and the group made a few suggestions for improvement. Never having met him, King recalled Petrossian "had a treatment, and we all dug the treatment so we just turned him loose." "Eyes of the Insane"'s war-themed music video was filmed on August 13, 2006, in the Los Angeles area. Casting company Tolley Casparis Casting sought a male Caucasian between the ages of 18 and 26 to appear in the clip, with auditions held on August 10, 2006. The official project notes deemed that "This guy must be a serious actor, capable of emoting everything through his eyes. He was innocent a few months ago, now he is scarred by seeing so much fighting. Strong eyebrows that do not overpower the face. Scars or large veins actually a plus." The video was shot as a "first-person narrative about the horrors leading up to the final moments of a soldier at war", and was described as "a single, long and tight close-up of the soldier's eye with images clearly reflected within his pupil and iris and perfectly choreographed with the rhythm of the music. Reflected are disconcerting images of para trooping into enemy territory, gunfire, helicopters and tanks, explosions, poignant flashbacks of his wife and child and home, and the images of his death." Two endings were shot; one in which the soldier is killed as the result of sustained combat wounds, and another in which the soldier commits suicide by hanging – the latter one was used. Jeff Hanneman confirmed that the band "loved" the eye concept, and personally felt that the video was "pretty amazing" when he first viewed it. King admitted the film is "pretty cool — I thought it was neat idea — very different, especially for us, because we usually do performance based videos." The video was exclusively posted on mp3.com late in October 2006. In 2007, the video earned a Metal Hammer Golden Gods Awards nomination for Best Video, but eventually lost to Avenged Sevenfold's "Seize The Day."

== Critical reception ==
Critics were generally positive when reviewing "Eyes of the Insane". Stylus magazine's Cosmo Lee described the track as "a dark, midpaced exploration of a soldier's psyche", and remarked that "it's memorable and would be a good breather between the usual barnburners". Peter Atkinson of KNAC.com felt that "'Eyes of the Insane' offers a post-traumatic sequel to 'Mandatory Suicide', again with a soundtrack that recalls the original, but boasting a couple truly mammoth hooks that do shake things up." Don Kaye of Blabbermouth made a comparison to a different Slayer track than Atkinson, and commented that "'Eyes of the Insane' and 'Catatonic' both have that slow, grinding feeling of doom that the band has done so well before on classics like 'Dead Skin Mask'."

== Awards ==
The song was nominated for Best Metal Performance at the 49th annual Grammy Awards. When asked for his thoughts on the nomination, King revealed that he did not "even care", and noted that Slayer fans "don't give a shit and that's the most important thing to me". The interviewer expressed his surprise at the nomination given Slayer's "inflammatory" lyrics, to which King replied, "That would be the coolest thing, you know? To win with the shit we write about." The ceremony was held on February 11, 2007, at the Staples Center in Los Angeles, with Slayer competing against Mastodon, Lamb of God, Ministry and Stone Sour. Slayer won the Best Metal Performance Grammy award, although the band was unable to attend because of a conflicting North American headlining tour. Araya commented about the win from a hotel room in Columbus, Ohio: "Jeff [Hanneman] and I put a lot into 'Eyes of the Insane' so we're thrilled that the Grammy voters took the time to listen to it, and then vote for it. We're out here on the road and we're all really, really happy." King disagreed, deeming the song "one of the poorest representations of us [Slayer] on the record [Christ Illusion]". He further said that, if given the decision, he would have chosen the controversial track "Jihad" to represent Slayer from their ninth album Christ Illusion. Critical of the Recording Academy, King said, "Realistically, I think people on the academy who vote pick the household name ... And that's what we are."

== Other media ==
The soundtrack to the 2006 horror film Saw III included "Eyes of the Insane", and was released on October 24, 2006, by Warcon Enterprises. The track was one of six songs performed by Slayer during their first US network television appearance on ABC-TV's Jimmy Kimmel Live! (January 19, 2007), and was the only song broadcast in its entirety. However, King dislikes playing "Eyes of the Insane" live, commenting, "It's just dull to play, good song just dull to play on guitar."

== Track listing ==
CD1
No.	Title	Length
1.	"Eyes of the Insane"	3:23
2.	"Eyes of the Insane" (Live)	3:31

CD2
No.	Title	Length
1.	"Eyes of the Insane"	3:23
2.	"Cult" (Live)	4:37
3.	"Reborn" (Live Video)

7" vinyl
No.	Title	Length
1.	"Eyes of the Insane"	3:23
2.	"Cult" (Live)	4:37

== Credits and personnel ==
Sources:

- Tom Araya – vocals, bass
- Jeff Hanneman – lead guitar
- Kerry King – lead and rhythm guitar
- Dave Lombardo – drums

== Charts ==
Chart performance for "Eyes of the Insane"
Chart (2006)	Peak position
Denmark (Tracklisten)	15
UK Singles (Official Charts)	97
