= Angel of Death (Slayer song) =

Slayer song

Song by Slayer

from the album Reign in Blood
- Released: October 7, 1986
- Recorded: 1986
- Studio: Hit City West, Los Angeles
- Genre: Thrash metal
- Length: 4:51
- Label: Def Jam
- Songwriter: Jeff Hanneman
- Producers: Rick Rubin; Slayer

"Angel of Death" is the opening track on American thrash metal band Slayer's 1986 album Reign in Blood. The lyrics and music were written by guitarist Jeff Hanneman. They detail the Nazi physician Josef Mengele's human experiments at the Auschwitz concentration camp during World War II.

"Angel of Death" led to accusations of Nazi sympathizing and racism against the band, which they vigorously denied but which followed them throughout their early career. Despite the controversy and the resulting delay in the release of Reign in Blood, the song remained a live favorite, and has appeared on all of Slayer's live albums.

The song has been described as highly influential in the development of thrash metal or speed metal, and is highly regarded by some critics; AllMusic's Steve Huey called it a classic and the album "the pinnacle of speed metal". The half-time riff was sampled by Public Enemy in their song "She Watch Channel Zero?!" from the 1988 album It Takes a Nation of Millions to Hold Us Back.

== Background and lyrics ==
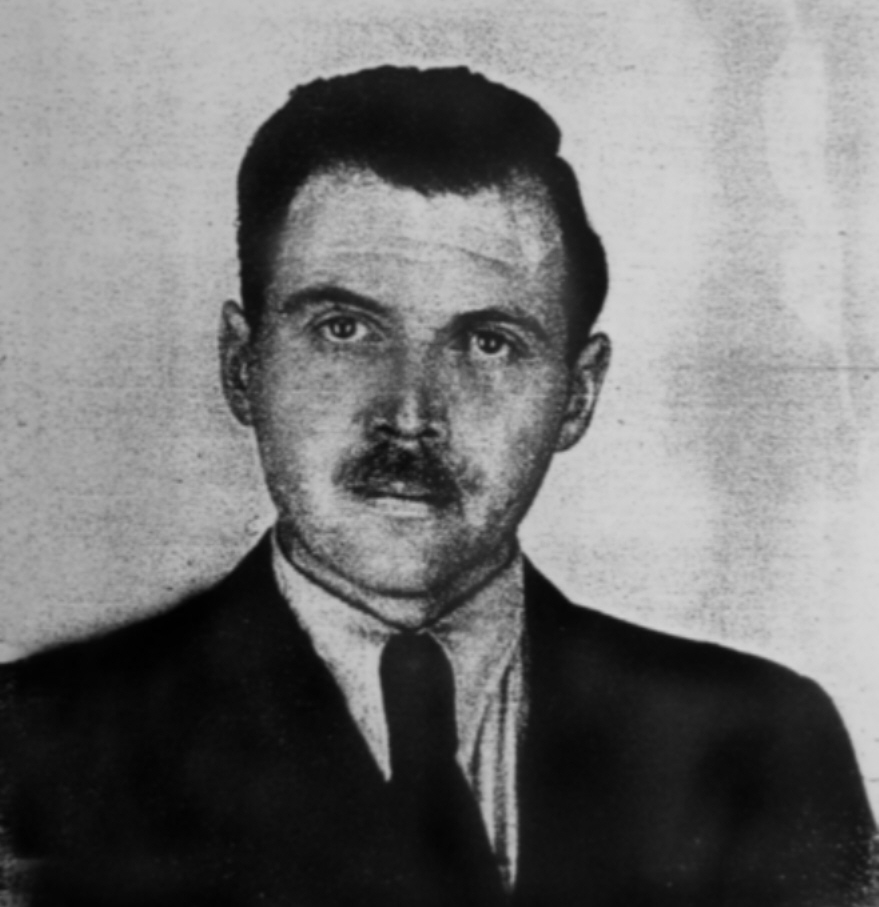
Josef Mengele inspired the song.

The horrifying tale of Josef Mengele told unflinchingly, shockingly. Not in anti-Semitic fashion, but with no bias towards either side whatsoever, just a brutal, stone-faced depiction of horror as clinical as the loathsome man himself. What's far more frightening than a horror tale is a vivid, true account of man's inhumanity to man, and one way to get the message across to kids is through music.

— Adrien Begrand of Decibel ( April 30, 2015)

Slayer guitarist Jeff Hanneman wrote "Angel of Death" after reading books about Nazi physician Josef Mengele while on tour with the band. He said that he remembered "stopping someplace where I bought two books on Mengele. I thought, 'This has gotta be some sick shit.' So when it came time to do the record, that stuff was still in my head—that's where the lyrics to 'Angel of Death' came from."

Although the lyrics are written both from Mengele's point of view and from that of a detached observer condemning his actions, Adrien Begrand of Decibel assessed that the lyrics have "no bias towards either side whatsoever." They detail Mengele's surgical experiments on patients at the Auschwitz concentration camp during World War II. Mengele's explorations were conducted on such groups as dwarfs and twins, and included both physical and psychological examinations. Among the tests he performed that are mentioned in "Angel of Death" are experimental surgeries performed without anesthesia, transfusion of blood between twins, isolation endurance, gassing, injections with lethal germs, sex change operations, the removal of organs and limbs, and abacination.

== Composition and music ==
"Angel of Death" sample

The song opens with stop-start guitar riffs utilizing power chords and tremolo picking, accompanied by cymbal hits that are muted by Dave Lombardo. According to Adrien Begrand of Decibel, guitarists Jeff Hanneman and Kerry King "[announce] their presence with grandeur and intimidation," and according to him, the track's intro "epitomized [the genre] in 30 seconds."

At 4 minutes and 51 seconds, "Angel of Death" is the longest track on the album, which is 29 minutes in total. It is one of the most structurally conventional songs on the album, featuring prominent verses and choruses, which most of the songs eschew. Araya's vocal performance begins with a piercing, wordless scream. "[G]uitarists Kerry King and Jeff Hanneman deliver their intricate riffs [and] drummer Dave Lombardo performs some of the most powerful drumming ever recorded" at 210 beats per minute.

When drummer Lombardo left Slayer in 1992, they recruited a full-time replacement in Forbidden drummer Paul Bostaph. Bostaph made one mistake out of the nine songs the band trialled him with, on "Angel of Death". Before the "big double bass part" there is a lead section, which Bostaph could not understand, as he had to learn from live records recorded with Lombardo. Bostaph could not tell how many revolutions the guitar riff goes before the bass sequence. The band members told him there were eight, "perfecting" the song afterwards.

The song is also linguistically significant for containing the only recorded use of the word "abacinate", as mentioned in Christopher Foyle's Foyle's Philavery: A Treasury of Unusual Words.

== Controversy ==
Graphic used by the band in the 1990s

The lyrics of "Angel of Death" delayed the release of Reign in Blood which was originally scheduled for April 1986. The band was signed to Def Jam Records, whose distributor, Columbia Records, refused to release the album due to its subject matter and artwork, which they believed were "too graphic". Reign in Blood was eventually distributed by Geffen Records on October 7, 1986, but it did not appear on Geffen Records' official release schedule because of the controversy.

"Angel of Death" caused outrage among Holocaust survivors, as well as their families and the general public. The controversy led to accusations of Nazi sympathizing and racism, which have followed Slayer throughout their career. The band members have consistently denied the accusations, stating that they do not condone racism or Nazism and are merely interested in the subject. In 1987, Hanneman told the NME magazine:

I feel you should be able to write about whatever you want. "Angel of Death" is like a history lesson ... I'd read a lot about the Third Reich and was absolutely fascinated by the extremity of it all, the way Hitler had been able to hypnotise a nation and do whatever he wanted, a situation where Mengele could evolve from being a doctor to being a butcher.

Some took Hanneman's interest in Nazi history and his collection of Nazi memorabilia (his most prized item being a German Knight's Cross) as evidence of sympathizing. Hanneman objected, stating:

I know why people misinterpret it—it's because they get this knee-jerk reaction to it. When they read the lyrics, there's nothing I put in the lyrics that says necessarily he was a bad man, because to me—well, isn't that obvious? I shouldn't have to tell you that.

King also dismissed the accusations:

Yeah, "Slayer are Nazis, fascists, Communists"—all that fun shit. And of course we got the most flak for it in Germany. I was always like, "Read the lyrics and tell me what's offensive about it. Can you see it as a documentary, or do you think Slayer's preaching fucking World War II?" People get this thought in their heads—especially in Europe—and you'll never talk them out of it.

Hanneman also wrote "SS-3", a song about senior SS commander Reinhard Heydrich, which appeared on the band's 1994 album Divine Intervention. The song "Jihad" from their 2006 album Christ Illusion has drawn comparison to "Angel of Death". "Jihad" deals with the September 11, 2001 attacks, telling its events from a terrorist's perspective. Araya expected the subject matter to create a similar backlash to that of "Angel of Death", but it did not materialize—in part, he believes, due to people's view that the song is "just Slayer being Slayer".

== Reception and legacy ==
Although "Angel of Death" did not chart, it was highly praised by critics reviewing Reign in Blood. Clay Jarvis of Stylus Magazine observed how the song "smokes the asses of any band playing fast and/or heavy today. Lyrically outlining the horrors to come, while musically laying the groundwork for the rest of the record: fast, lean and filthy." Adrien Begrand of PopMatters remarked: "There's no better song to kick things off than the masterful 'Angel of Death', one of the most monumental songs in metal history."

The guitar riff in the song's midsection is seen by some as a "turning point" for the band creatively and musically. Adrien Begrand of Decibel wrote, "They underachieved on Hell Awaits, coasting a bit, showing little to no progression in the wake of Haunting the Chapel, but that riff, that wicked groove shakes the band out of their creative stasis." Vocalist Tom Araya's opening scream in the track has been referred to one "for the ages."

The song was sampled for use as the main riff in the 1990 song "Godlike" by industrial act KMFDM. It was also sampled by Public Enemy for their track "She Watch Channel Zero", as well as by M.O.P for their song "Raise Hell".

== Personnel ==
- Tom Araya – bass, vocals
- Kerry King – guitars
- Jeff Hanneman – guitars
- Dave Lombardo – drums

=== Production ===
- Rick Rubin – production
- Slayer – production
- Howie Weinberg – mastering
- Andy Wallace – engineering

== See also ==
- List of anti-war songs
