= World Painted Blood =

Studio album by Slayer
- Released: November 3, 2009
- Recorded: March–August 2009
- Studios: The Pass, Los Angeles, California
- Genre: Thrash metal
- Length: 39:46
- Labels: American Recordings, Sony Music
- Producer: Greg Fidelman

Slayer chronology
Christ Illusion (2006)	World Painted Blood (2009)	The Vinyl Conflict (2010)

Singles from World Painted Blood
- 1. "Psychopathy Red" Released: April 18, 2009; 2. "Hate Worldwide" Released: July 28, 2009; 3. "World Painted Blood" Released: November 26, 2010

World Painted Blood is the eleventh studio album by American thrash metal band Slayer. It was released through American Recordings and Sony Music on November 3, 2009 and was produced by Greg Fidelman and executively produced by Rick Rubin. It is the band's only album produced by Greg Fidelman and the last album to feature the band’s original lineup including guitarist Jeff Hanneman (who died of liver cirrhosis in 2013) and drummer Dave Lombardo (who was dismissed from Slayer the same year). With much anticipation for the album after 2006's Christ Illusion, members of Slayer began revealing information about the album beginning in early 2009.

There were four different artworks released for the album, each of which completed one-fourth of a map that when put together illustrates the earth painted with red. There are eleven tracks on the album, with origins illustrating death and destruction, war, serial killers, and the Apocalypse. World Painted Blood is the band's final album to be released through American Recordings, as well as the final collaboration between Slayer and label owner Rubin, who had worked with the band as their producer or executive producer since Reign in Blood (1986).

Three singles were released from the album: "Psychopathy Red", "Hate Worldwide", and "World Painted Blood". The album received generally positive reviews from music critics. It was praised by The A.V. Club, who said that the "resounding success in that regard: It's eclectic, but never self-consciously so." "Hate Worldwide" and "World Painted Blood" were both nominated for Best Metal Performance at the 52nd and 53rd Grammy Awards, respectively. The album peaked at number two on the US Top Hard Rock Albums chart, as well as twelve on the Billboard 200 and forty-one on the United Kingdom album chart.

== Writing and recording ==
World Painted Blood marked the first time that the band wrote material in the studio rather than entering the studio fully prepared with lyrics. The fact that they were not prepared made guitarist Kerry King skeptical. King related: "I was kind of thinking, 'Man, this could be the first record in a long time that's got a little bit of filler,'" he acknowledges. "But I think every song came out great. I was concerned some would sound similar, and every one is completely different. It's cool how it worked out." The majority of the lyrics and music were written by guitarist Jeff Hanneman. Kerry King stated: "I like when Jeff writes as much as he did for this record. When you have one guy doing most of the writing you only get one perspective. A lot of Jeff's stuff has a very punky vibe this time; the stuff I write sounds thrashy but with a hint of punk, and when Jeff writes the stuff is more punk with a hint of thrash. It works together well." Unlike 2006's Christ Illusion, the band was "under-ready" with their lyrics and music.

The album was recorded in Los Angeles, California with producer Greg Fidelman from late January and March 2009. There were 13 songs recorded for the album, but only 11 appear on the album. In May 2009, King said of the album: "I think this one has a little bit of everything—more so than anything we've done since Seasons. So I would imagine people are gonna compare it to that one." The band had recorded thirteen songs for the album, seven written by lead guitarist Jeff Hanneman and six by King, although not all of them were included. King later confirmed the album's release date was pushed back to late summer 2009. An article on Slayer's website confirmed the album's name. On August 20, 2009, Roadrunner Records confirmed the track listing. Thom Jurek of Allmusic said the production "takes a different tack altogether for this guitar-manic crew." A listening party for World Painted Blood was held on October 30, 2009 at Duff's Brooklyn in Williamsburg, New York. The event started at 9:00 pm.

During the recording of World Painted Blood, King used BC Rich Guitars, Marshall Amplifiers and Cabs, Dunlop strings and picks, EMG pickups, and Korg tuners. Hanneman used ESP guitars, Marshall Amplifiers and Cabs, Dunlop strings and picks, Monster Cables, and Shure Wireless System. Vocalist/bassist Araya used ESP basses, Marshall Bass Amplifiers and Cabs, EMG Pick-Ups, Dunlop Picks and accessories, and MXR Effects. Lombardo used Tama Drums, Paiste cymbals, Pro-Mark drum sticks, and Evans drum heads.

== Music and lyrics ==
Record producer Greg Fidelman said that "the fact that the songs were still new and fresh to them, and they hadn't been playing them for six months in rehearsal, kept the vibe and excitement in the studio very high." Vocalist Tom Araya said that there "are two principal music writers in this band, so you're going to get a combination of speed and heaviness," and later said that the "writing is really aggressive and fast, while Jeff likes things to be fast, but with melodies and grooves. In making this album, we seemed to share the same vision from song ideas to titles; when we get together as Slayer, it just happens, nothing is contrived, it's not thought out, we just do it, and we did that with this new album." Lombardo said that Hanneman's writing and performance had "gone back to this great punk energy, especially with 'Psychopathy Red'."

"World Painted Blood" includes the B-side "Atrocity Vendor".

Allmusic said that it expressed moods such as Harshness, Fiery, Confidence, Rowdiness, Aggressiveness, Rebellious, Cathartic, Anger, and Hostility. It also is categorized in genres like speed metal and heavy metal. Thom Jurek said Lombardo's percussion beats "are WAAAAAAAY up in the mix," and said that "you can understand every word, even on the thrashers" about Tom Araya's vocal style. "[T]he guitars are simply further down in the mix and sometimes it becomes difficult to discern Araya's bass. Therefore, the first listen or two to World Painted Blood might be a bit confusing for the seasoned Slayer fan, but that changes quickly, and the sound of those drums blasting in one's head will become a more than welcome presence in the mix."

The album's title track was said by band members to be the continuation of "Final Six", which was an outtake from their previous album. "Final Six" origins deal with the apocalypse. "Human Strain" deals with apocalyptic origins as well. The track was explained by guitarist Jeff Hanneman to initially be about the human race dying off by a mutative disease. The title of "Public Display of Dismemberment" refers to the consequences that countries outside of the United States give to citizens for crimes. Tom Araya said that "Unit 731" is "very similar to Josef Mengele in the sense that it was a medical unit in the military, which was a Japanese military unit, actually. They did kind of the same thing; they tested the limits of the human body and recorded it for scientific purposes." "Playing With Dolls" is about a child witnessing a serial killer. "Beauty Through Order" is about Elizabeth Báthory, the most prolific female serial killer. Jeff Hanneman explained: "I've been meaning to write a song about that for a long time. I couldn't figure out the angle, I was thinking, 'How does a woman write? I can't write like a woman I'm a guy!' Then I just figured, 'Well, she's evil; she has lots of power and killed people.' So I just started writing and the lyrics and they came out." Slayer revealed to Revolver that the track "Snuff" has no lyrical concept. "Psychopathy Red" was inspired by the Russian serial killer Andrei Chikatilo.

== Singles ==
"Psychopathy Red" was the first single from World Painted Blood.

"Psychopathy Red", a song inspired by the Soviet serial killer Andrei Chikatilo, was made available as a "limited edition, blood-red vinyl seven-inch vinyl" disc on April 18, 2009 as part of the third annual Record Store Day. The song premiered on October 29, 2008, on a YouTube stream. Originally, "Psychopathy Red" was going to be a b-side of World Painted Blood, but after there was access to it on the internet, they decided to add it to the album's track list.

On July 28, the song "Hate Worldwide" was released as a CD-single, exclusively available at Hot Topic stores. The song was available on the internet before November 2008 and until July 2009, it had been streamed more than a half-million times. "Hate Worldwide" was released as a limited-edition single on October 20, 2009, through Columbia Records as a CD. The song was made available exclusively at Hot Topic stores and was streamed at Hot Topic's ShockHound.com. The composition was written by Kerry King who said "It's a really cool track, and Tom's voice sounds incredible on it. The last line in the song's chorus is '..spread a little hate worldwide,' and that's what we've been doing for 25 years." Along with five other songs, "Hate Worldwide" was nominated for a Best Metal Performance Grammy Award, but lost to "Dissident Aggressor" by Judas Priest, which ironically Slayer covered 22 years earlier on their 4th studio album "South of Heaven", (Priest's 2010 Grammy Award winning version, was a live recording, taken from the 2009 album "A Touch of Evil: Live").

The title track, "World Painted Blood", was released as a seven-inch single on November 26, 2010, and was limited to 2500 copies. It included the b-side "Atrocity Vendor". A music video for the song had already been released on June 16, 2010. The single was exclusively released through the Metal Club record store chain. The song itself was said by the band to be a continuation of "Final Six", a bonus track on the special edition of Slayer's 2006 album Christ Illusion, and deals with the end of the world. Araya and Hanneman have said "World Painted Blood" is "one of the more classic Slayer songs". A music video has been made for "Beauty Through Order", however, it has been removed from most online sources.

== Reception ==
Professional ratings
Aggregate scores
Source	Rating
Metacritic	78/100
Review scores
Source	Rating
AllMusic	3.5/5 stars
Alternative Press	3.5/5 stars
The A.V. Club	A−
Chicago Tribune	3/4 stars
Consequence of Sound	4/5 stars
musicOMH	4/5 stars
NOW Magazine	5/5 stars
Pitchfork	7.3/10
PopMatters	8/10
Record Collector	4/5 stars

=== Critical ===
The album earned generally positive reviews. On Metacritic, it holds a score of 78 out of 100 based on 11 reviews.

"Sounding," said Classic Rock, "like it was recorded in a studio where the amps were set to FUCK YOU rather than 11 and armed with a dual attack of heavy and heaviest, Slayer's 10th studio album [sic] offers a remarkable clarity of vision and strength of identity."

"Quite frankly we were beginning to wonder if they still had an album like this left in them," said Greg Moffitt of the BBC. "A few of the songs command the attention with the insistence of old… [The album is] a deliciously wicked ride." AllMusic's Thom Jurek awarded the album three and a half stars, saying, "In many ways it could be Reign In Blood Revisited… Some compositions on this new recording have more of the band's early–style melody in them, with lightning flare–up riffs between verses: quick unexpected guitar pyrotechnics; and blast beat power drumming from Dave Lombardo pushing it all into red."

Leonard Pierce of The A.V. Club remarked on the "burden" that "weighs particularly heavy on bands that made their reps with intensity and innovation; Slayer, in particular, was perceived as wandering in the wilderness during the years Paul Bostaph sat behind the drum kit." He rewarded the album with an A−, describing it as "eclectic, but never self-consciously so. It rarely flags in intensity, and it's good enough that if it were inserted in Slayer’s discography right after Seasons In The Abyss — the record it most resembles — it would be an almost seamless transition." Adrien Begrand of PopMatters gave the album eight out of ten stars, saying, "It's a slight improvement on Christ Illusion, as more than on any of their previous five albums, the foursome of guitarists Jeff Hanneman and Kerry King, bassist/vocalist Tom Araya, and drummer Dave Lombardo find themselves revisiting the seminal styles of their 1986–88 heyday." MusicOMH gave the album four out of five stars.

Blabbermouth's Ryan Ogle gave it 7.5 out of 10 and said it "jumps into fairly aggressive thrash gallop, but doesn't really have that 'straight-for-the-throat' feel you'd expect from track one."

=== Commercial ===
World Painted Blood sold 41,000 copies in the United States in its first week, landing it at number twelve on the Billboard 200. It had sold 160,000 copies in the US as of February 2015. The album peaked at number seven in Germany and debuted at forty–one on the UK Albums Chart. "Hate Worldwide" was nominated for Best Metal Performance in 2009, and the title track was nominated for the same award a year later, but lost to Iron Maiden's "El Dorado".

== Release ==
=== Marketing and artwork ===
In June 2009, it was announced that the album would be released in the late summer of 2009. The album was released on November 3, 2009. The album's artwork was revealed on September 15, 2009. Four different covers were equally shipped for a standard that when put together, they create a world map covered in blood. The album has four special collector's edition CD covers, and each of them "display one-fourth of a provocative continental map illustrated with human skulls and bones; when placed together, the four images form a complete and grisly map of the world." Each album has a blood-red, transparent top panel, with the map displayed beneath it. The full map is also seen in a sleeve of the double-digipak edition of World Painted Blood.

=== Release history ===
Region	Year	Label	Format	Catalog	Ref
Europe	2009	American Recordings	LP, Gatefold	88697 41318 1	
Russia	2009	Sony Music Entertainment	CD	88697 61431 2	
Japan	2009	Sony Music Japan International Inc.	CD	SICP 2253	
Europe	2009	American Recordings	CD	88697614912	
United States	2009	American Recordings	CD	88697 41318 2	
Europe	2009	American Recordings	CD	88697413182	
Australia	2009	American Recordings	CD, DVD, NTSC	88697534382	
Europe	2009	American Recordings	CD, DVD, NTSC	88697534382	
United States	2009	American Recordings	CD, DVD, NTSC	88697 41318 2	
United States	2009	American Recordings	LP, Gatefold	88697413181	

== Track listing ==
No.	Title	Lyrics	Music	Length
1.	"World Painted Blood"	Jeff Hanneman; Tom Araya	Hanneman	5:53
2.	"Unit 731"	Hanneman	Hanneman	2:39
3.	"Snuff"	Kerry King	King	3:42
4.	"Beauty Through Order"	Hanneman; Araya	Hanneman	4:36
5.	"Hate Worldwide"	King	King	2:52
6.	"Public Display of Dismemberment"	King	King	2:34
7.	"Human Strain"	Hanneman; Araya	Hanneman	3:09
8.	"Americon"	King	King	3:22
9.	"Psychopathy Red"	Hanneman	Hanneman	2:26
10.	"Playing with Dolls"	Hanneman; King; Araya	Hanneman	4:13
11.	"Not of This God"	King	King	4:20
Total length:				39:46

Japanese edition bonus track
No.	Title	Lyrics	Music	Length
12.	"Psychopathy Red" (explicit live version)	Hanneman	Hanneman	2:47
Total length:				42:33

== Personnel ==
Personnel taken from World Painted Blood CD booklet.

Slayer

- Tom Araya – vocals; bass (disputed) (Note: Tom Araya is credited with playing bass in the album's liner notes, although Kerry King has claimed to have played bass on the album.)
- Jeff Hanneman – lead guitars
- Kerry King – lead and rhythm guitars; bass (claimed)
- Dave Lombardo – drums

Leads

- World Painted Blood – Hanneman
- Unit 731 – Hanneman/King
- Snuff – 1st: Hanneman/King, 2nd: King
- Beauty Through Order – 1st: King, 2nd: Hanneman
- Hate Worldwide – 1st: Hanneman, 2nd: King
- Public Display of Dismemberment – 1st: Hanneman, 2nd: King
- Americon – Hanneman/King
- Psychopathy Red – King/Hanneman
- Playing with Dolls – Hanneman
- Not of This God – 1st: Hanneman, 2nd: King, 3rd: King

Additional personnel

- Greg Fidelman – production, recording, mixing
- Rick Rubin – executive production
- Dana Nielsen – recording
- Sara Killion – assistant engineer
- Vlado Meller – mastering
- Mark Santangelo – mastering assistance
- Dan Monti – digital editor
- Morning Breath Inc. – art direction, design
- Andrew Stewart – photography

== Charts ==
Chart (2009)	Peak position
Australian Albums (ARIA)	9
Austrian Albums (Ö3 Austria)	13
Belgian Albums (Ultratop Flanders)	38
Belgian Albums (Ultratop Wallonia)	40
Canadian Albums (Billboard)	8
Danish Albums (Hitlisten)	21
Dutch Albums (Album Top 100)	15
Finnish Albums (Suomen virallinen lista)	12
French Albums (SNEP)	28
German Albums (Offizielle Top 100)	7
Greek Albums (IFPI)	26
Hungarian Albums (MAHASZ)	27
Irish Albums (IRMA)	38
Italian Albums (FIMI)	26
Japanese Albums (Oricon)	20
New Zealand Albums (RMNZ)	16
Norwegian Albums (VG-lista)	15
Polish Albums (ZPAV)	16
Scottish Albums (Official Charts)	31
Spanish Albums (Promusicae)	56
Swedish Albums (Sverigetopplistan)	21
Swiss Albums (Schweizer Hitparade)	14
UK Albums (Official Charts)	41
UK Rock & Metal Albums (Official Charts)	4
US Billboard 200	12
US Digital Albums (Billboard)	18
US Top Hard Rock Albums (Billboard)	2
US Top Rock Albums (Billboard)	4
US Indie Store Album Sales (Billboard)	1

=== Year-end charts ===
Chart (2010)	Position
US Top Hard Rock Albums (Billboard)	49

== Certifications ==
Region	Certification	Certified units/sales
Poland (ZPAV)	Gold	10,000^{*}
^{*} Sales figures based on certification alone.
