= Christ Illusion =

- Original cover

Studio album by Slayer
- Released: August 8, 2006
- Recorded: February 28 − April 2006
- Studios: NRG Recording and Westlake Recording, Los Angeles, California
- Genre: Thrash metal
- Length: 38:25
- Label: American Recordings
- Producer: Josh Abraham

Slayer chronology
Eternal Pyre (2006)	Christ Illusion (2006)	World Painted Blood (2009)

Alternative cover
- Censored cover for the album

Singles from Christ Illusion
- 1. "Cult" Released: June 6, 2006; 2. "Eyes of the Insane" Released: November 20, 2006

Christ Illusion is the tenth studio album by American thrash metal band Slayer, released on August 8, 2006 by American Recordings. It was the band's first album featuring all four original members in nearly sixteen years. Slayer's drummer, Dave Lombardo, performed with the band for the first time since Seasons in the Abyss (1990).

Depicting a mutilated Christ painted by longtime collaborator Larry Carroll, the album's graphic artwork courted controversy; an alternative cover was issued to conservative retailers who felt uncomfortable with the original, and the band also put out a censored cover without the offensive artwork. Lyrics, particularly in the song "Jihad", describe the September 11 attacks from the perspective of a terrorist. Following protests, all Indian stocks of the album were recalled and destroyed by EMI India.

Christ Illusion received generally favorable critical reviews, and entered the US Billboard 200 at number 5, making it the band's second highest U.S. chart position as of 2015. The album includes the Grammy Award-winning songs "Eyes of the Insane" and "Final Six".

== Recording ==
Christ Illusion was recorded via computer between two studios: NRG Studios, North Hollywood, with assistant engineer Dave Colvin; and Westlake Studios, Los Angeles, where Brian Warwick assisted. Guitarist Kerry King recalls nine of the eleven songs originally slated for Christ Illusion were demoed in 2004, with Dave Lombardo at the drum kit. However, Lombardo recalls recording with King as far back as early 2003, when two demos were completed at Lombardo's home. In a July 2004 interview, guitarist Jeff Hanneman reported "Me and Kerry have a bunch of songs," and expressed the band's intent to finish the record that year. Slayer's label American Recordings was at the time negotiating a switch of record distributors from Columbia Records to Warner Bros. Records, meaning the recording would have been temporarily shelved until the issue became resolved. For this reason the group did not finish a record at that time, as the distribution deal with Warner Bros. Records was not finalized until late July 2005.

Slayer wished for Reign in Blood producer Rick Rubin to produce the album, and expected him to do so after Rubin expressed an initial interest. Rubin was busy, however, which caused a further delay to recording. While Christ Illusion's recording was finally underway Rubin lent production to Metallica's Death Magnetic (2008), an action later described by King as a "slap in the fucking face." Josh Abraham produced the album instead, and was praised by Blabbermouth's Don Kaye "for capturing much more of the spark than has been apparent on the last few records." Despite missing an opportunity to produce Christ Illusion, Rubin contributed in an "executive production" capacity. King was critical of his involvement, and said he cannot recall Rubin's presence in the studio during the recording, and that Rubin's main contribution was in providing suggestions during the final mix. Jamie Thomson of UK's The Guardian newspaper was scornful of Rubin's contribution, and observed Slayer "seem unwilling to ditch the nu-metal tendencies that have made much of their recent output so resistible, which suggests Rubin's involvement was considerably less hands-on than in his remarkable redemptions of Johnny Cash and Neil Diamond."

As with Slayer's previous two albums, all rhythm guitar tracks on Christ Illusion were laid down by King. Using a Marshall JCM 800 as the main guitar sound throughout the album, King wrote roughly 80% of his guitar solo parts prior to the sessions. The song "Catalyst," meanwhile, almost saw inclusion on Slayer's 2001 album God Hates Us All, existing in an alternative version which features former drummer Paul Bostaph on drums. Lombardo's involvement marked the first time he, King, Araya and Hanneman had appeared together on record since the release of Seasons in the Abyss in 1990, a reason cited by guitarist Jeff Hanneman for an alleged clearer punk vibe throughout the songs on the album. Lombardo personally described the album as "a matured Reign in Blood", while King described it as "a mix between God Hates [Us All] and Seasons [in the Abyss]."

Although eleven songs were originally slated for the album, only ten made the final track listing. A song penned by Hanneman, entitled "Final Six," was meant for inclusion, with the song name originally declared as the album's title by vocalist Tom Araya to George Stroumboulopoulos of CBC's The Hour. Questioned about the album's title by Kevin and Bean of Los Angeles KROQ-FM, King replied "I'm not positive it's been nailed yet. I think last week was the deadline and I'm not sure where it ended up, so I'm gonna have to take the fifth on that one. The way it was going, my vote was overlooked, so… That's why I'm not real thrilled about it." However, Araya took one weekend off for vacation during the recording of the album and required a two-hour gall bladder operation the following Monday on May 5, 2006. Thus, he was unable to finish the vocals for the song in time for the album's release. King hinted "Final Six" might appear on a special digipack release of Christ Illusion: a release which eventually surfaced in July 2007. "Final Six" also appeared on the soundtrack to the film Punisher: War Zone the following year.

== Marketing and promotion ==
"Cult"
"Cult" was written by guitarist King as a comment on both religion and America, which he describes as "the biggest cult in the world".

Being Slayer's tenth studio album, Christ Illusion was originally scheduled for release on June 6, 2006, the sixth day of the sixth month of the sixth year of the 2000s decade. This connotation with the Book of Revelation's Number of the Beast was being used as a marketing ploy to hype a number of media releases at the time, most notably the remake of the horror film The Omen. King said the idea was scrapped because of the number of other bands that had the same idea, but USA Today reported that the release date was thwarted because the band had failed to secure sufficient studio recording time. Having missed the "Satanic" date, the release was pushed back to July 25; however, this date was not met either. Despite this, an exclusive T-shirt, limited to 666 units and only available via the band's store, was released in commemoration of "the sixth day of the sixth month of the sixth year". Five thousand copies of the limited edition EP "Eternal Pyre" were also released on this date, and made available via Hot Topic stores in the US. The EP previewed the song "Cult", and the track was made available for streaming on the band's official website the same day. Issued in Europe on June 23, the EP landed at number 48 on the Swedish charts and number 2 on the Finnish charts, while on June 30, Nuclear Blast Records released a 7" vinyl picture disc version limited to a thousand copies.

Not all media attention surrounding the group on June 6 was favorable. National Day of Slayer, LLC, which describes itself as "a non-profit corporation in the State of Wyoming", requested on their website that Slayer fanatics participate in "The National Day of Slayer" by coming together and listening to the group's tracks. However, vandals attacked St. Joseph's Seminary in Yonkers, New York, by spray-painting a large pentagram in front of the doors, black inverted crosses in two columns in front of the main entrance, and the number six on three steps leading into the Seminary. The words "Reign in Blood" were scrawled on the seminary landing, while the phrase "Better to reign in Hell than to serve in Heaven", taken from Book 1 of John Milton's poem Paradise Lost, was found inscribed on two inside columns. The National Day of Slayer website took credit for inspiring the perpetrator(s), and a media investigation discovered that the site had left instructions that fans "spray paint Slayer logos on churches, synagogues, or cemeteries".

Fans were given an exclusive preview of further tracks culled from the upcoming album before its release. In addition to "Cult", the tracks "Jihad" and "Eyes of the Insane" were made available for streaming on the Spanish website Rafabasa.com in late June. A listening party event for the album took place on July 22 at Duff's Brooklyn in New York City's Williamsburg neighborhood. Filmed on the set of The Henry Rollins Show, a live rendition of "Disciple" (taken from Slayer's 2001 album God Hates Us All) was posted online, followed by "Cult"'s live performance which aired on the Independent Film Channel a few days later. BBC Radio 1's "Mike Davis Rock Show" gave "Skeleton Christ" a premier airing on August 1, and by August 4 the full album was available for streaming via Slayer's official MySpace profile. AOL Radio complimented this by launching an "All Slayer" station in anticipation of Christ Illusion's release, playing all of Slayer's previously released songs and tracks from the upcoming record.

In late July 2006, bus benches in several Californian cities were decorated with promotional artwork for Christ Illusion. City officials in Fullerton, California, demanded the artwork be immediately removed from seventeen bus benches located throughout the city, and contacted the hired company which had originally put the adverts in place to assume the task. The officials disliked the band's name, which they felt referred to a murderer. They also took offense to the antichrist and skull logo adorning the bench artwork. Eventually, the artwork was removed. However, various Orange County, California areas surrounding the city of Fullerton still had benches sporting the cover artwork.

== Commercial performance ==
Christ Illusion was released on August 8, 2006 by American Recordings / Warner Bros. Records. In its first week of release, the album sold 62,000 copies in the United States and debuted at number 5 on the Billboard 200 chart. Though this ranked as the band's highest chart position as of 2015, and was their first top 10 charting since 1994's Divine Intervention, the album dropped to number 44 the following week. Christ Illusion reached number 9 in Australia, number 3 in Canada, number 6 in Austria, number 8 in the Netherlands, number 10 in Norway, number 9 in Poland and debuted at number 2 in Finland and Germany. The single "Eyes of the Insane" won the "Best Metal Performance" category at the 49th Grammy Awards. The song "Final Six" also won in the same category at the 50th Grammy Awards. The album won the 2006 Metal Storm Award for Best Thrash Metal Album.

== Critical reception ==
Professional ratings
Aggregate scores
Source	Rating
Metacritic	72/100
Review scores
Source	Rating
AllMusic	4/5 stars
The Austin Chronicle	4/5 stars
Blender	4/5 stars
Drowned in Sound	8/10
The Guardian	2/5 stars
musicOMH	3/5 stars
PopMatters	8/10
Spin	6/10
Stylus	B
Uncut	4/5 stars

The album was met with mostly favorable reviews. On Metacritic, it was given a score of 72 out of 100 based on 21 reviews. Thom Jurek of AllMusic hailed the album as "raging, forward-thinking heavy metal melding with hardcore thrash", and wrote that Christ Illusion marked a return to "what made them such a breath of fresh air in the first place." Ben Ratliff of The New York Times described the album as possessing "a kind of demented gravity, and the music bears it out: it is the most concentrated, focused Slayer record in 20 years." PopMatters critic Adrien Begrand called it "Slayer's best album in sixteen years and their most thought-provoking work to date", and the album was placed at number 15 on PopMatters' list of The Best Metal Albums of 2006.

Drummer Lombardo came in for particular praise; though Rolling Stone panned the album, the reviewer acknowledged that "at least their awesome drummer Dave Lombardo shows off some chops." Blabbermouth's Don Kaye thought that "while flawed", Christ Illusion "proves that the band still has a few tricks up its sleeve and one very potent weapon behind the kit." Peter Atkinson of KNAC.com felt similarly, and reported Lombardo's "performance is top notch throughout and does give the album a looser feel than Paul Bostaph's technical precision offered." In 2011, Complex Media Network's music website, Consequence of Sound, honored Christ Illusion on a List 'Em Carefully installment dedicated to writer David Buchanan's top thirteen metal records released between 2000 and 2010, citing foreign controversy and overall sonic brutality during drummer Dave Lombardo's powerful return. Decibel Magazine gave it a favorable review, stating, "Their hatred for religion in general, Christianity in particular, unwitting Americans, and anyone on the other side of a soldier's gun has inspired Slayer to record their most vital album in years." Chris Campion of The Observer stated that the album is "their most rigorously conceived and focused for years."

Not all critics were positive. Chris Steffen of Rolling Stone magazine dismissed the album, noting that it "mines much of the same territory as its predecessor, God Hates Us All, just without the memorable riffs." Jamie Thomson of The Guardian described the album as "wholly disappointing," and thought the band sounded "unwilling to ditch the nu-metal tendencies that have made much of their recent output so resistible." KNAC.com contributor Peter Atkinson felt that the album "demands OUTRAGE —more calculatingly so than any other album the band has done," and that "that, in a nutshell, is Christ Illusion's glaring weakness."

== Album artwork ==
Several aspects of Christ Illusion's content and promotion generated adverse attention and publicity. In particular the cover art, painted by Larry Carroll and depicting a mutilated, stoned Jesus. Carroll, who had painted the cover artwork to previous Slayer albums such as Reign in Blood (1986), South of Heaven (1988), and Seasons in the Abyss (1990), resumed duties on Christ Illusion. Working solely from track names and formative lyrics, Carroll produced the original on a 4-by-4-foot slab of wood using a combination of media. Having requested an image of Christ in "a sea of despair", King commented that an early version seemed as though Christ was "chilling out in the water". The final image portrays Christ with a missing eye and amputated hands, and standing amidst a sea of blood and severed heads. Araya deemed this version "much better because he looked like a drug addict!", while King admired the artwork enough to purchase the original. Certain album pre-orders gave fans the chance to win one of ten autographed lithographs of the artwork, while an alternative, non-graphic cover was made to appease retailers who had refused to stock the original version.

World Entertainment News Network reported Slayer were attracting controversy through issuing the artwork. Joseph Dias, general secretary of the Mumbai Christian group Catholic Secular Forum, (CSF) took "strong exception" to the original album artwork, and issued a memorandum to Mumbai's police commissioner in protest. Chris Steffen of Rolling Stone magazine commented that "The album art takes it all over the top with an image axeman Kerry King dubs 'Christ in a Sea of Despair'", while KNAC.com's Peter Atkinson deemed the artwork "defiantly sacrilegious".

== Lyrical themes ==
Lyrical themes explored on Christ Illusion deal with terrorism, warfare and religion, which drew criticism from conservative groups. It includes a depiction of the September 11 attacks from the viewpoint of one of the terrorists ("Jihad"), and a portrayal of a soldier's experience of post-traumatic stress ("Eyes of the Insane"). The song "Cult" revolves around King's perception of flaws in American religion, while "Consfearacy" has been described as a "government hating song".

"Eyes of the Insane"
The Araya penned lyrics of "Eyes of the Insane" were inspired by an article called "Casualties of War" in Texas Monthly, dealing with the plight of soldiers suffering from post-traumatic stress.

Critical reaction to the album's lyrical content was mixed. Thom Jurek of Allmusic felt the "dark, unrelentingly twisted-as-fuck lyrics reflect a singular intensity," and praised the band for connecting their anti-religion stance with a belief that religion has underscored many wars throughout history. However, Rolling Stone's Chris Steffen mourned that it had become "downright painful to hear Tom Araya — at 45 years old! — continue to belt out the band's increasingly self-parodying, anti-religious lyrics," and singled out lyrics such as "Religion's a whore" and "I've made my choice: six six six!" as over the top. Jamie Thomson of The Guardian wrote that the album left "no blasphemy... unuttered", while Peter Atkinson of KNAC.com observed that "when not fixating on religion, the band revisit their other favorite subject — war — in surprisingly familiar terms," and remarked that Slayer had sunk "to the level of God-repelling dunderheads Deicide." He concluded the review with the opinion that "It's déjà vu all over again from God Hates Us All — and once you've titled something God Hates Us All, haven't you made your point enough already?"

The Catholic Secular Forum condemned the album's lyrical content. Joseph Dias issued a statement in which he deemed the lyrics to "Skeleton Christ" to be an "insult to Christianity." The memorandum was sent to Mumbai's police commissioner, and further expressed concern that the track "Jihad" would offend "the sensibilities of the Muslims... and secular Indians who have respect for all faiths." EMI India met with the CSF, apologizing for Christ Illusion's release and recalling the album with no plans of a reissue. On October 11, 2006 it was announced all stocks had been destroyed. Though Araya had expected "Jihad"'s treatment of the events of 9/11 to create an American backlash, it failed to materialise, in part, he believes, due to peoples' view that the song is merely "just Slayer being Slayer".

== Track listing ==
All tracks (both music and lyrics) written by Kerry King unless noted.

No.	Title	Lyrics	Music	Length
1.	"Flesh Storm"			4:14
2.	"Catalyst"			3:07
3.	"Skeleton Christ"			4:22
4.	"Eyes of the Insane"	Tom Araya	Jeff Hanneman	3:23
5.	"Jihad"	Hanneman, Araya	Hanneman	3:31
6.	"Consfearacy"			3:07
7.	"Catatonic"			4:54
8.	"Black Serenade" (Alternate version in special edition)	Hanneman, Araya	Hanneman	3:16
9.	"Cult"			4:40
10.	"Supremist"			3:51
Total length:				38:25

Special edition bonus track
No.	Title	Lyrics	Music	Length
11.	"Final Six"	Araya, Hanneman	Hanneman	4:10
Total length:				42:35

Special edition DVD
No.	Title	Lyrics	Music	Length
1.	"Slayer on Tour '07" (documentary)	N/A	N/A	5:11
2.	"Eyes of the Insane" (music video)	Araya	Hanneman	3:53
3.	"South of Heaven" (from the Unholy Alliance DVD)	Araya	Hanneman	4:46
Total length:				13:50

== Credits ==
Performance and production credits are adapted from the album liner notes.

=== Personnel ===
Slayer

- Tom Araya – vocals; bass (disputed) (Note: Tom Araya is credited with playing bass in the album's liner notes, although Kerry King has claimed to have played bass on all Slayer albums since the 1990s.)
- Jeff Hanneman – lead guitars (all except "Catalyst" and "Consfearacy")
- Kerry King – lead and rhythm guitars; bass (claimed)
- Dave Lombardo – drums

Production

- Rick Rubin – executive production
- Josh Abraham – production, mixing
- John Ewing Jr. – engineering
- Ryan Williams – mixing engineering
- Dave Colvin – assistant engineering (at NRG)
- Brian Warwick – assistant engineering (at Westlake)
- Armand B. Crump – guitar tech, bass tech
- Norm Costa – drum tech
- Vlado Meller – mastering

Artwork and design

- t42design – art direction, design
- Josh Victor Rothstein – photography
- Larry Carroll – cover art
- Krucified Kittens – art direction, cover design (special edition only)

=== Studios ===
- NRG, Los Angeles, California – recording
- Westlake Studios, Los Angeles, California – recording
- Pulse Recording, Los Angeles, California – mixing
- Sony Music Studios, New York City, New York – mastering

=== DVD credits ===
Slayer on Tour '07

- Matt Weston – direction
- Dave Wither – direction
- Brett Jordan – direction
- Andrew Deerin – production
- Kevin Flynn – editing

"Eyes of the Insane"

- Tony Petrossian – direction, production, editing
- Amanda Fox – production

"South of Heaven"

- Adam Rothlein – direction, editing
- Jen Rothlein – production

== Charts ==
Chart (2006)	Peak position
Australian Albums (ARIA)	9
Austrian Albums (Ö3 Austria)	6
Belgian Albums (Ultratop Flanders)	19
Belgian Albums (Ultratop Wallonia)	48
Canadian Albums (Billboard)	3
Croatian International Albums (HDU)	2
Danish Albums (Hitlisten)	14
Dutch Albums (Album Top 100)	8
Finnish Albums (Suomen virallinen lista)	2
French Albums (SNEP)	52
German Albums (Offizielle Top 100)	2
Hungarian Albums (MAHASZ)	11
Irish Albums (IRMA)	10
Italian Albums (FIMI)	18
Japanese Albums (Oricon)	17
New Zealand Albums (RMNZ)	10
Norwegian Albums (VG-lista)	10
Polish Albums (ZPAV)	9
Scottish Albums (Official Charts)	17
Swedish Albums (Sverigetopplistan)	4
Swiss Albums (Schweizer Hitparade)	11
UK Albums (Official Charts)	23
UK Rock & Metal Albums (Official Charts)	1
US Billboard 200	5
US Top Rock Albums (Billboard)	2
US Indie Store Album Sales (Billboard)	1
