= Abacination =

Blinding as punishment or torture

Abacination is a form of corporal punishment or torture, in which the victim is blinded by having a red-hot metal plate held before their eyes.

== Historical precedent ==
Blinding as punishment has existed since antiquity, and was specifically documented as a form of torture in ancient Persia. A corrosive chemical, typically slaked lime, was contained in a pair of cups with decaying bottoms, e.g., of paper. The cups were strapped in place over the prisoner's eyes as they were bound in a chair. The slowly draining corrosive agent from the cups eventually ate away at the eyeballs.
