= Lawrence Carroll =

Australian-born American painter (1954–2019)

Lawrence (Larry) Carroll
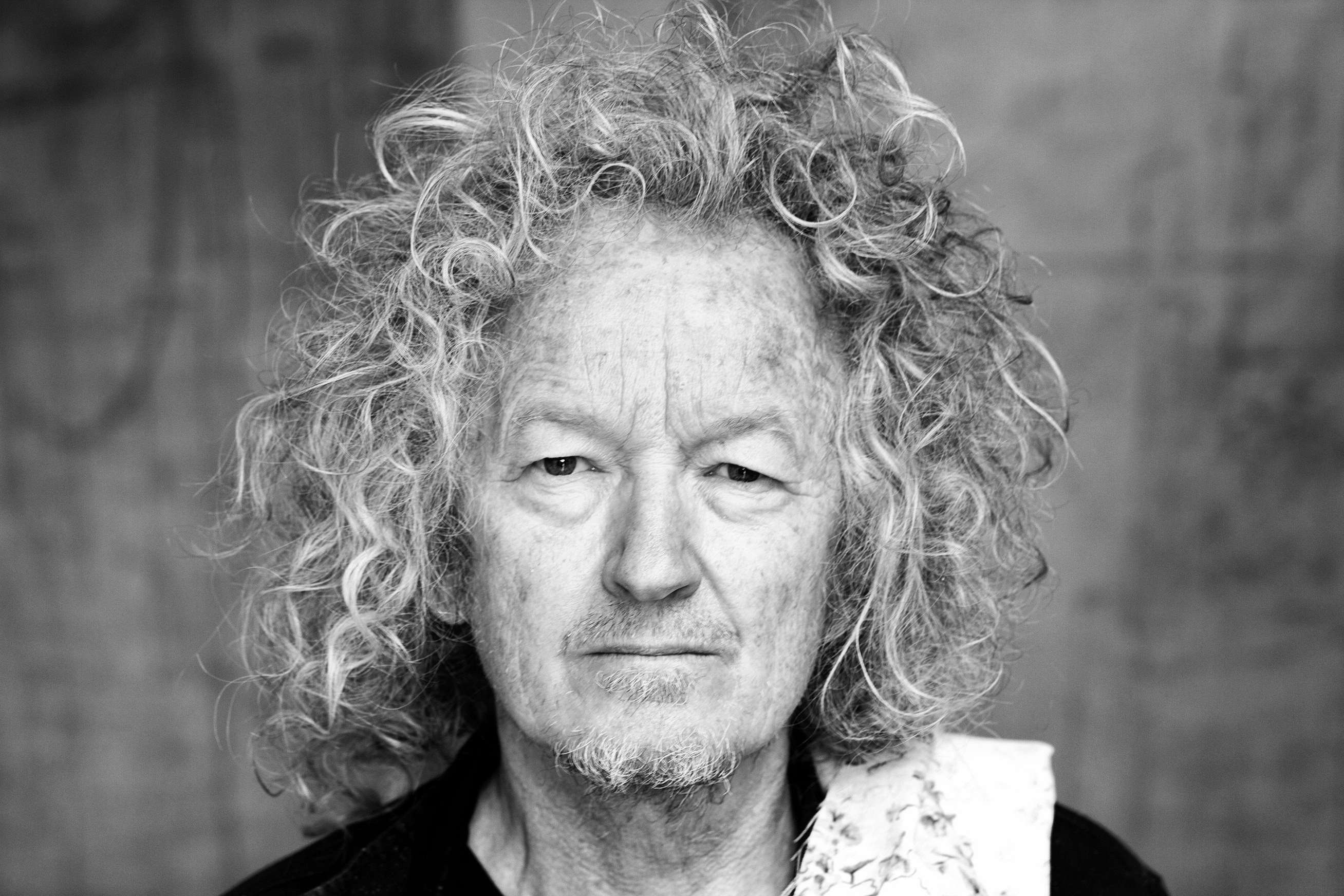
- Born: October 26, 1954; Melbourne, Victoria, Australia
- Died: May 21, 2019 (aged 64); Cologne
- Citizenship: United States
- Occupation: Artist
- Known for: Painter and early career as designer Slayer album artwork

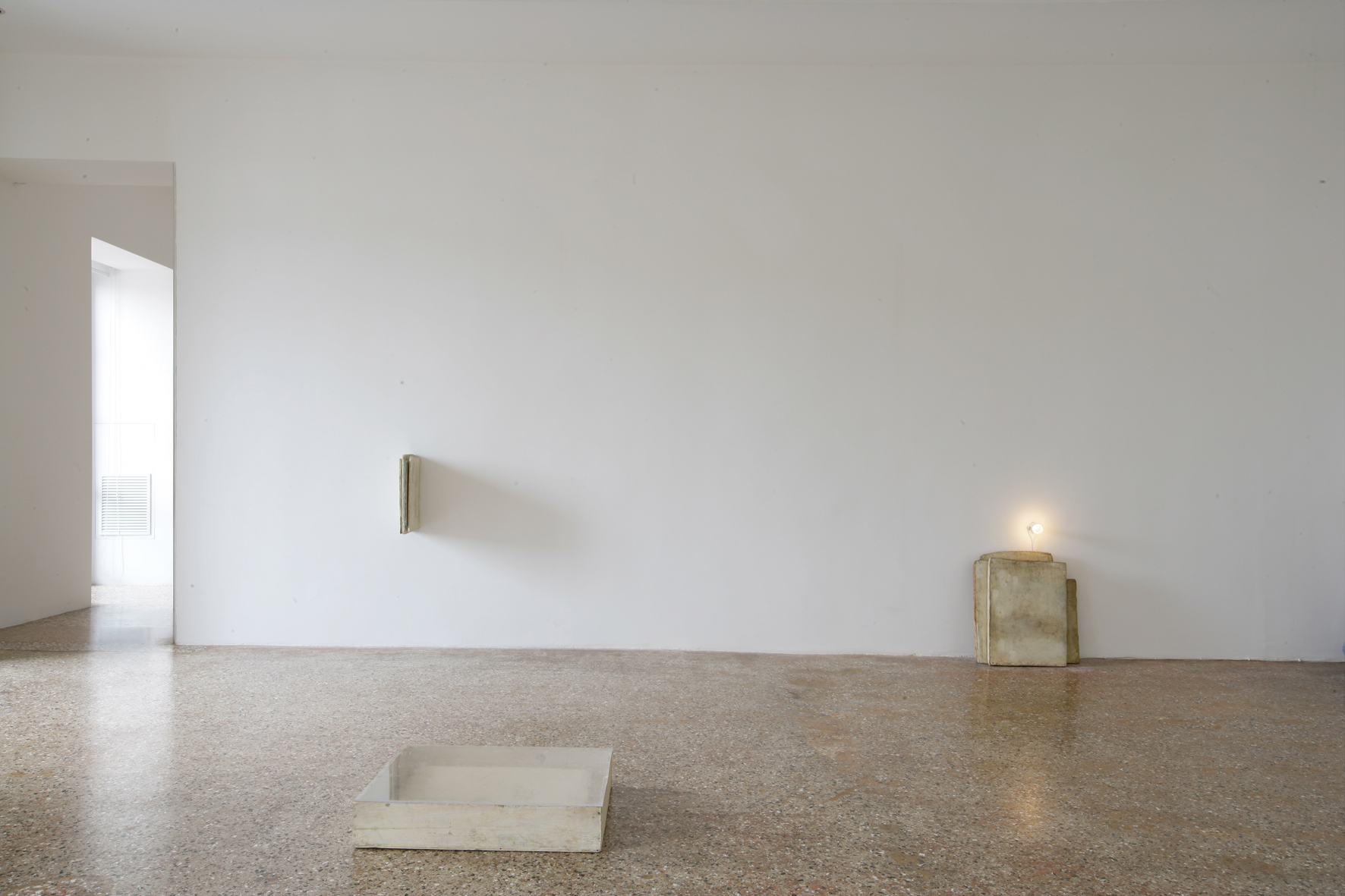
Lawrence Carroll, Installation, Museo Correr, Venice, 2008

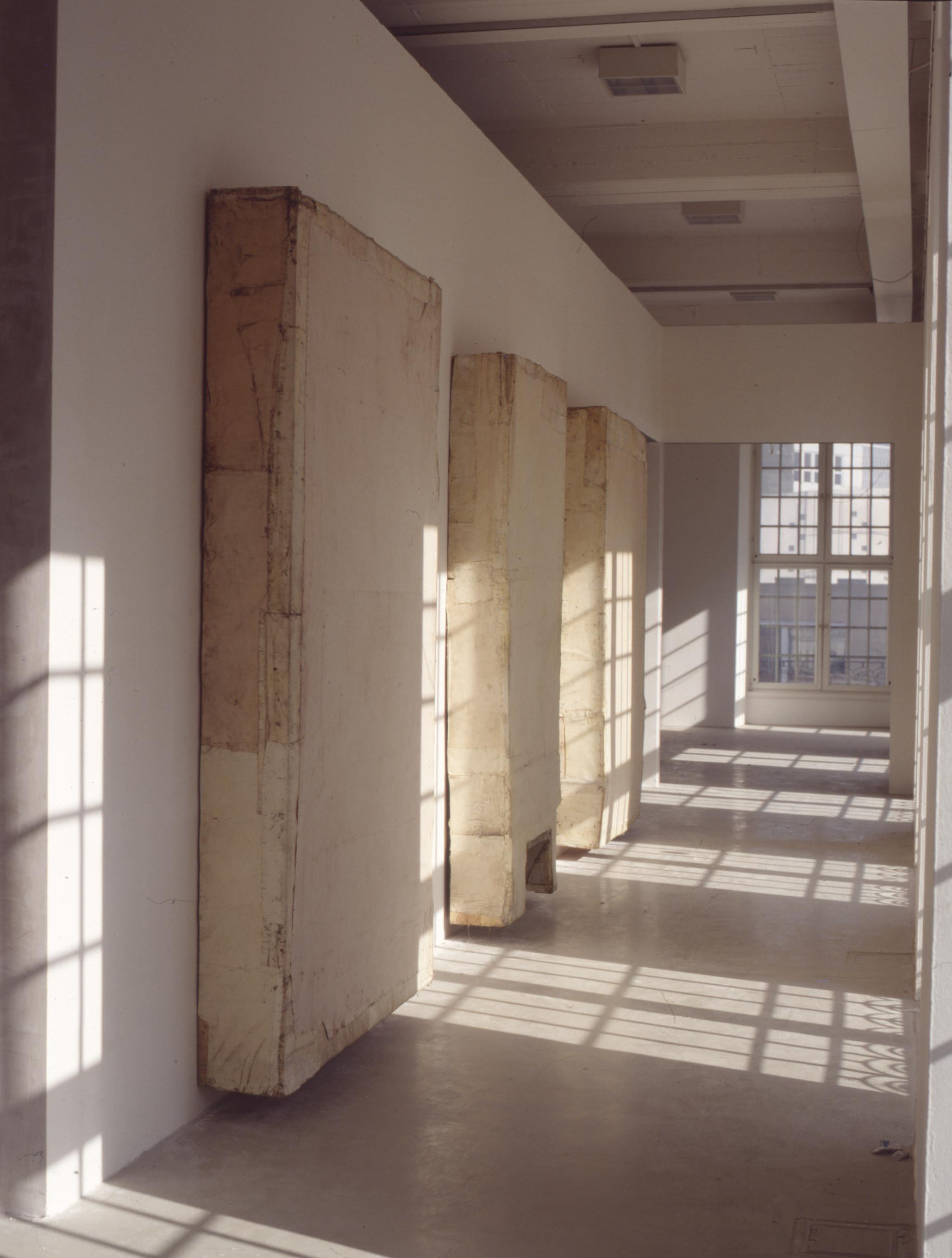
Lawrence Carroll, Installation, documenta IX, Kassel, Germany, 1992

Lawrence W. Carroll (26 October 1954 – 21 May 2019) was an Australian-born American painter who established a career on both sides of the Atlantic. His works are held in museums around the world and he notably was included in major exhibitions such as Documenta IX and the Venice Biennale In his early career Carroll worked as an illustrator for The Progressive, The Village Voice, The New York Times, The Los Angeles Times, Newsweek, The Nation, Reason, Spin, Ray Gun, and other periodicals drawing political illustrations and notably he designed the artwork for the American thrash metal band Slayer's album covers. However it is Carroll's career as a painter that is most significant. His approach to materials, to the scale and structure of the objects is highly distinctive.

== Early life ==
Carroll was born to George and Mary Carroll (Gaynor) in Melbourne, Australia. He moved to Santa Monica, California, with his parents and older brother Ronald in 1958. In 1960 his family relocated to Newbury Park, a suburb located 45 minutes north of Los Angeles. He attended Newbury Park High School and later worked as a chef to pay for his studies at Moorpark Junior College and then later the Art Center College of Design in Pasadena, where he studied art on a full scholarship.

== Career ==
In 1984 Carroll moved to New York City from Los Angeles with his own family. In 1988 he had his first solo exhibition of his paintings at Stux Gallery in New York City. In 1989 he was invited by Harald Szeemann as one of nine young American artists to participate in Szeeman's international exhibition Einleuchten at the Deichtorhallen in Hamburg, Germany, alongside international artists such as Joseph Beuys, Bruce Nauman, Robert Ryman and others. In 1992 he was invited by Jan Hoet to participate in documenta IX in Kassel, Germany. In the early stage of his career Carroll was often invited to participate with the curatorial team of Collins & Milazzo (Tricia Collins and Richard Milazzo) in New York City. In 1994 he participated once again with Udo Kittelmann in his exhibition "The state of things" in the Kolnischer Kunstverein in Koln, Germany. Later in 1995 Carroll exhibited in the Guggenheim Museum's exhibition "Material Imagination" in New York City. In 2000 he participated in "Panza, legacy of a collector" at MOCA in Los Angeles. In 2005 he participated in 50 years of documenta, in Kassel, Germany. In 2007 and 2008 he had solo museum exhibitions at Hotel des Arts in Toulon, France, and at the Museo Correr in Venice, Italy. In 2014/15 the Bologna Museum of Modern Art (MAMbo) hosted a large survey exhibition with works from the mid-1980s to the present.

Carroll exhibited widely in Europe and the United States, and is represented in the permanent collections of a number of museums and public galleries, including the Solomon R. Guggenheim Museum in New York City, the Los Angeles County Museum of Art, Los Angeles, Museum of Contemporary Art, Los Angeles (MOCA), The Margulies Collection, Miami, Museum of Contemporary Art San Diego, Jumex Collection Mexico City, MART Rovereto Italy, Panza Collection Varese, Italy, Panza Collection Sassuolo in Modena, Italy, Art Gallery of New south Wales, Sydney Australia. Stadtisches Museum Abteiberg Mönchengladbach Germany, Museo Cantonale d'Arte, Lugano and many other private and public collections worldwide.

=== Slayer ===
Although tangential to his practice as a painter, Carroll's designs for Slayer's album covers Reign in Blood (1986), South of Heaven (1988), Seasons in the Abyss (1990) and Christ Illusion (2006) were notable. Reign in Blood was placed in the "top 10 heavy metal album covers of all time" by Blender. Christ Illusion was banned in India for its graphic art depicting Christ mutilated with missing limbs, in a sea of blood with severed heads.

=== Table paintings ===
In the late 1990s Carroll started to explore paintings that would move away from the orthodoxy of the frame, preferring instead to make works whose form and architecture would push towards the sculptural though Carroll always regarded himself as a painter, albeit one where the works depth and dimension allowed him to insert cavities and hidden spaces into the face and sides of the painting expanding the body and narrative possibilities for the work.

In 2002 Carroll created an installation in Munich, Germany for a project called "getting lost" Raum der Stille, in the Karmelitenkirche, Promenadeplatz where he included one of his first works for which he would later coin the name "table paintings". The table paintings commenced with the table (structure) which was never predetermined and was made intuitively. After the table was made Carroll then began to create the structure that grew from the table using pieces of wood from the artist's studio. Carroll thought of the structure as drawing, which could continually be altered and added to or subtracted from (erasure). The form which is connected to the table by screws was often disconnected and moved around until another form appeared that interested the artist, and at this point the structure was reconnected to the table. This process went on for months. Once a form was found Carroll often then closed one or more of the forms using newspaper and glue or cardboard. All during this process the structure and the forms were painted. More often than not the work was then completely taken apart and reassembled on the table to begin again until a form (gesture) was found that could have never been predicted. Due to this lengthy process few of these table paintings ever reached completion.

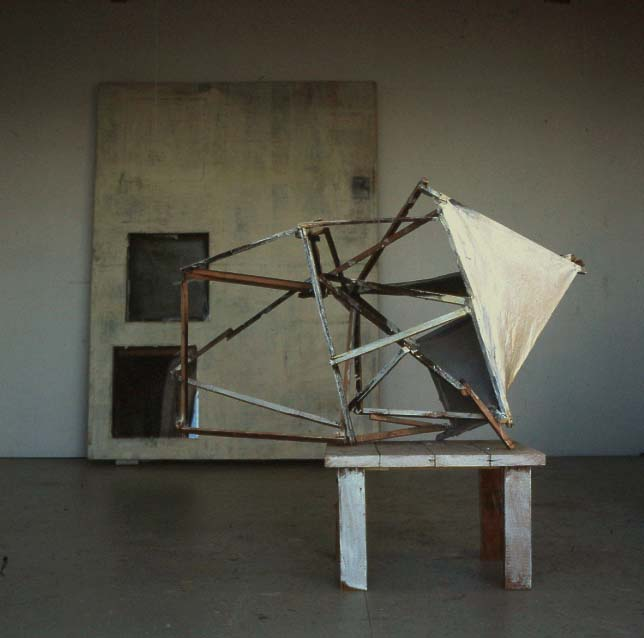
Lawrence Carroll, table painting, Malibu, California, 2002

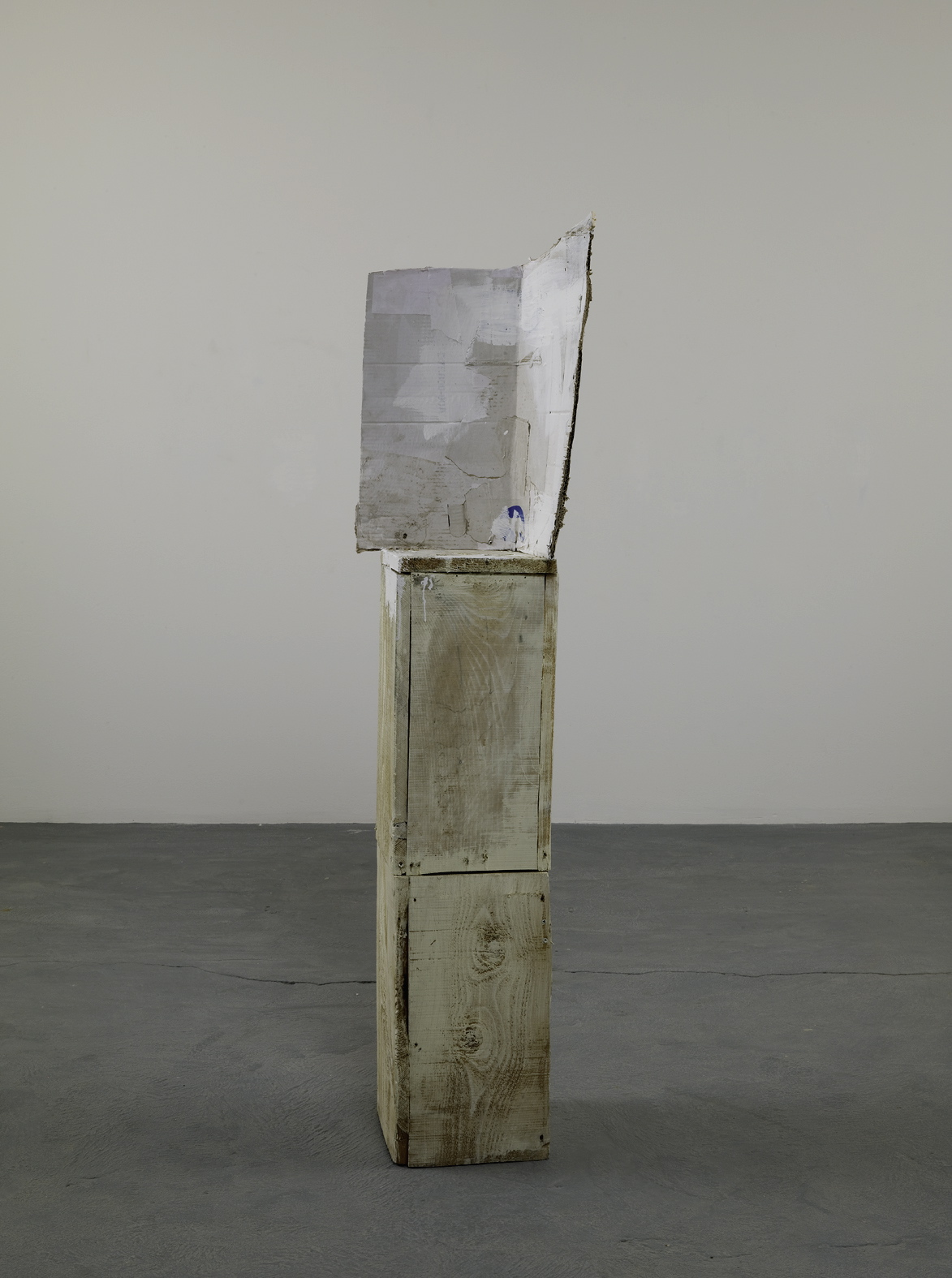
Lawrence Carroll, table painting, Venice, 2008–2009

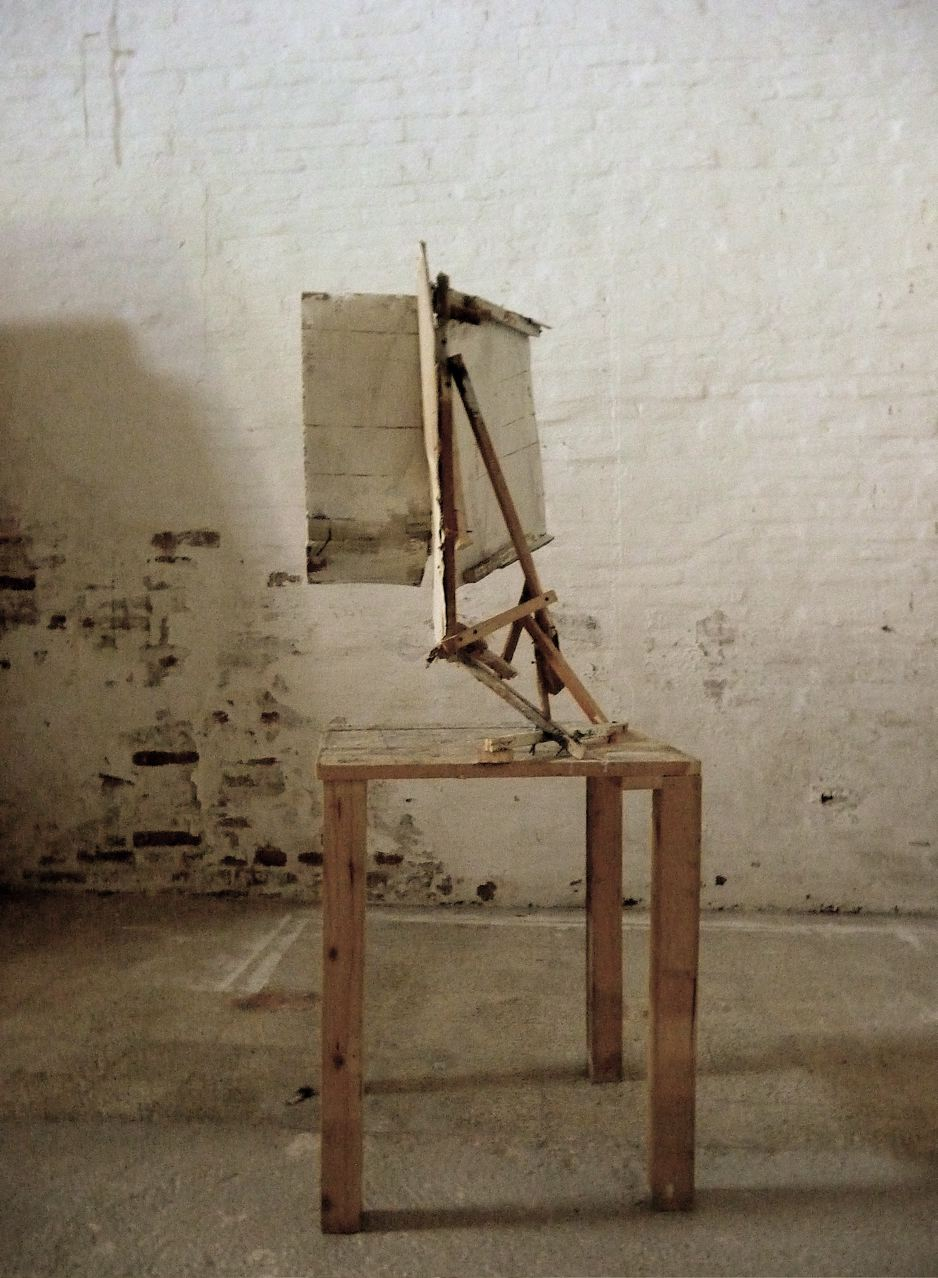
Lawrence Carroll, table painting, Venice

=== White Oval Paintings ===
Though perhaps best known for his table paintings, Carroll also created a ‘White Oval Painting’ series (2015–2017), which consists of oval-shaped canvases painted with house paint and dust from his studio.
