= Duff's Brooklyn =

Coordinates: 40°42′31.75″N 73°57′28.03″W

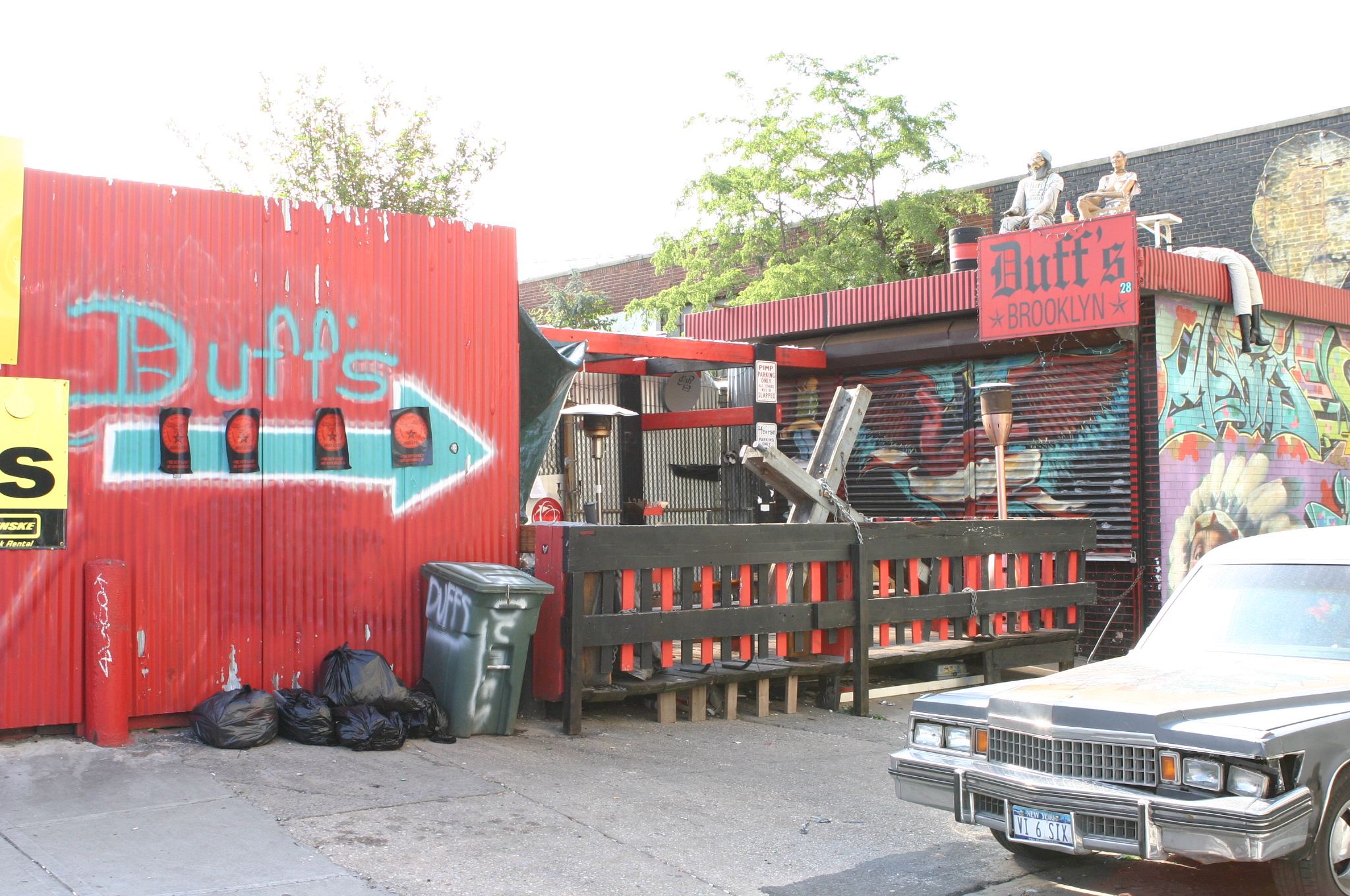
Duff's Brooklyn

Duff's Brooklyn is a heavy metal bar located at 168 Marcy Avenue in Williamsburg, Brooklyn, New York City.

Duff's initially opened as "Bellevue Bar" in the Hell's Kitchen, Manhattan in 1999, before moving to Brooklyn in 2004 with a name change to Duff's Brooklyn.The original Brooklyn location was at 28 North 3rd Street, where the bar resided from December 2004 to December 2008. Due to the rapid gentrification of area, the bar was forced relocate in December 2008. The bar reopened in December 2008 on Williamsburg's South Side (168 Marcy Avenue), in a space four times larger than the original bar. Duff's is frequented by Tri-state metalheads and rock n' rollers, and is a stop off for many heavy metal bands passing through New York City on tours. Some visitors of note have been Rob Zombie, Pantera, Iron Maiden, Kerry King of Slayer, Type O Negative, Celtic Frost, Exodus, Lamb of God, Machine Head, Suffocation, The Sword, Watain, 1349 and many others.

The bar has also hosted many official CD and DVD release parties for local and global acts such as Black Label Society, Lamb of God, Mudvayne, Pantera, Queensryche, Slayer, Suffocation, and Type O Negative. The bar's unique decor has also attracted many photo shoots and has made it a desirable spot to film in for independent filmmakers, as well as the better known MTV, MTV2 (including The Headbanger's Ball 20th Anniversary show), VH1 Classic's "That Metal Show", Fuse TV, and Burning Angel.
