= Eternal Pyre =

EP by Slayer
- Released: June 6, 2006
- Recorded: NRG Studios in North Hollywood, and Westlake Studios in Los Angeles
- Genre: Thrash metal
- Label: American Recordings (US)
- Producers: Josh Abraham, Matthias Mirke, John Sherwood

Slayer chronology
Soundtrack to the Apocalypse (2003)	Eternal Pyre (2006)	Christ Illusion (2006)

Eternal Pyre is an extended play by the thrash metal band Slayer. Released June 6, 2006 (06/06/06) through American Recordings, the EP was limited to a pressing of 1,000 copies, later expanded to 5,000. The EP precedes the band's full-length album Christ Illusion, which, like the EP, features the song "Cult". The EP was released exclusively through Hot Topic chain stores in the United States and copies were also available in Germany, Finland and Sweden on June 23, 2006. There are three tracks featured on the album: an audio track of the brand-new "Cult", a live video recording of "War Ensemble", and a video of behind-the-scenes material involving the band. The EP was not well received by critics, with few critics actually reviewing the album. The album charted on four different charts, peaking number two in Finland and three in Denmark.

== Background ==
The album Christ Illusion was originally set for release on June 6, 2006. Slayer guitarist Kerry King stated this tentative release date was scrapped as a number of other bands had the same idea and thought it was "fucking lame", although USA Today reported the release date was thwarted because the band had failed to secure sufficient studio recording time. Eternal Pyre was released instead, a preview of their album to be released in the coming months. The EP featured the track "Cult", a live performance of "War Ensemble" in Germany and four minutes footage of the band in the recording studio. Originally, it was thought that the extended play would feature a live version of "Dead Skin Mask" instead of the live version of "War Ensemble". Many news reporters were told that the album would feature the "Live Intrusion" video, described as a clip of one of the band's fans who carved Slayer's name into his forearm." 5,000 copies were released exclusively through Hot Topic chain stores in the United States and copies were also available in Germany, Finland and Sweden on June 23. Nuclear Blast Records released a further 7" vinyl picture disc version limited to one thousand copies on June 30.

== Composition ==
Eternal Pyre features three tracks in total. "Cult" was characterized by Thom Jurek as "scathing rejection of religion as the cause for world conflict." The song revolves around guitarist Kerry King's perception of flaws in American religion and was a comment on America, which he describes as "the biggest cult in the world". Their performance was positively commented on, with Pitch.com saying that "King and Jeff Hanneman riff like they're summoning a storm of thunder, lightning and human blood," and was also noted to be a down-tuned, two-string vamp "that slithers into the foreground creates a tension as Lombardo's cymbals call the band into the riff that opens the tune. It's slow, meaty, unrelenting in its tautness. When Araya's voice comes in, the whole track is off the rails and stays there." "War Ensemble" was filmed live from Germany, and contains four minutes of studio footage. Lyrics were said to "please fans still harboring a grudge from Catholic school."

== Reception and release ==
Critics did not receive Eternal Pyre very well, with few professionals actually reviewing the album. The Pitch criticized the price of the extended play at US$5.99, stating in comparison it makes iTunes a bargain. The Pitch's reviewer also said that "Slayer's worst is never far from its best, and this cut's in the middle." The extended play was, however, generally well received by fans, despite having a limited number of copies available. Eternal Pyre debuted at number forty-eight on the Swedish charts, and number two on the Finnish charts. With a limited pressing of 1,000 copies, the EP was exclusively made available in Hot Topic stores starting on June 6, and was later made available in Europe on June 23.

== Track listing ==
Music content
No.	Title	Lyrics	Music	Length
1.	"Cult"	Kerry King	King	4:40

Video content
No.	Title	Lyrics	Music	Length
2.	"War Ensemble (live)"	Tom Araya; Jeff Hanneman	Hanneman	5:59
3.	"Slayer – In the Studio, Behind the Scenes"			1:34

== Chart positions ==
Chart (2006)	Peak position
Danish Albums Chart	3
Finnish Albums Chart	2
Swedish Albums Chart	48
Swiss Albums Chart	88

== Personnel ==
The album's credits can be verified by Eternal Pyre's back cover.

=== Slayer ===
- Tom Araya – bass, vocals
- Kerry King – guitars
- Jeff Hanneman – guitars
- Dave Lombardo – drums

=== Production ===
- Josh Abraham – production on track No. 1
- Matthias Mirke – production on track No. 2
- John Sherwood – production on track No. 2
- Kevin Estrada – direction on track No. 3
- John Ewing Jr. – engineering on track No. 1
- Ryan Williams – mixing engineering on track No. 1
- Frank Machel – editing on track No. 2
- Mare Schettler – mixing on track No. 2
