= Jeff Hanneman =

American guitarist (1964–2013)

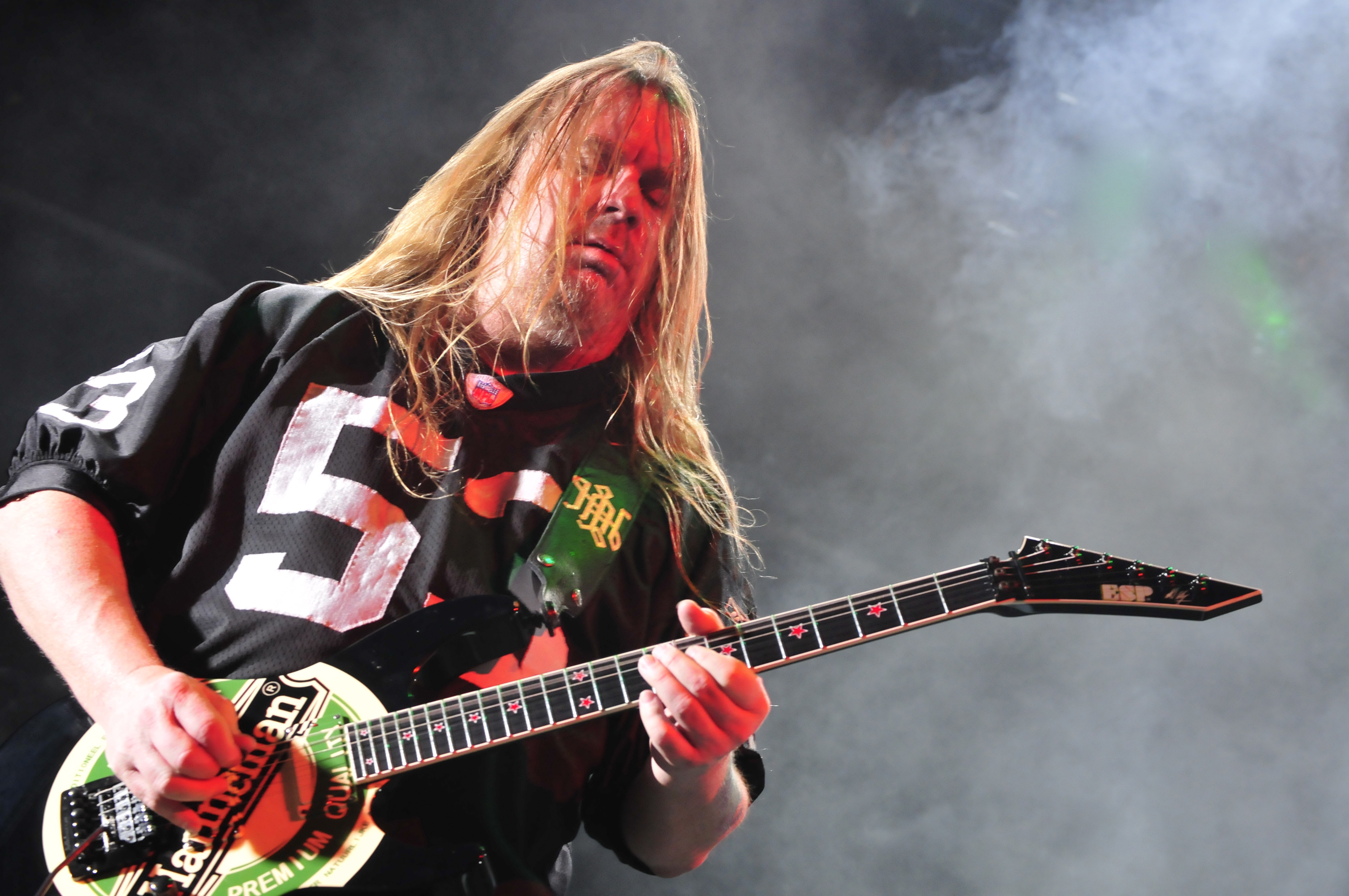
- Hanneman performing at Mayhem Festival 2009

Background information
- Born: Jeffrey John Hanneman; January 31, 1964; Long Beach, California, U.S.
- Died: May 2, 2013 (aged 49) Hemet, California, U.S.
- Genre: Thrash metal
- Occupations: Musician; songwriter
- Instrument: Guitar
- Years active: 1981–2013
- Formerly of: Slayer

Jeffrey John Hanneman (January 31, 1964 – May 2, 2013) was an American musician, best known as a founding member and co-lead guitarist of the thrash metal band Slayer. Hanneman wrote both music and lyrics for every Slayer album until his death in 2013.

Born in 1964 in Long Beach, California, Hanneman listened to heavy metal and hardcore punk in his childhood and adolescence. He was working as a telemarketer in 1981 when he met Kerry King, with whom he founded Slayer. He wrote the music for many of the band's most famous songs, such as "Angel of Death", "Raining Blood", and "Die by the Sword"; his own favorite album was Reign in Blood. His guitar riffs, inspired by metal and punk bands such as Judas Priest, Iron Maiden, and Dead Kennedys, have been called some of the most famous in metal, while his dual guitar solos with King have attracted high praise.

A reserved character, Hanneman rarely gave interviews, and preferred to indulge his interest in World War II Nazi Germany war medals and history. A bout of necrotizing fasciitis in early 2011 left him battling serious health issues; he was replaced on Slayer's tours by guitarists including Gary Holt. Hanneman died of liver failure on May 2, 2013.

== Biography ==
=== Early life ===
Hanneman was born January 31, 1964, in Long Beach, California, and grew up there in a family containing several war veterans: his father fought in Normandy during World War II and his brothers in Vietnam, making warfare a common conversation topic at the dinner table. War films were popular on TV at the time, and Hanneman often joined his brothers in constructing and coloring tank and plane models. His interest in warfare and military history has been attributed to his upbringing.

In a 2009 interview with Decibel magazine, he stated his father is German, but fought for the Allied side in World War II. In the same interview, he also goes into detail of what district of Germany his father and grandparents hail from. His grandfather was fluent in German.

Hanneman was introduced to heavy metal music as a child through his older sister Mary, when she was listening to Black Sabbath at her house. Once he reached high school, he discovered hardcore punk, which had a significant influence on his style and attitude.

=== Slayer ===
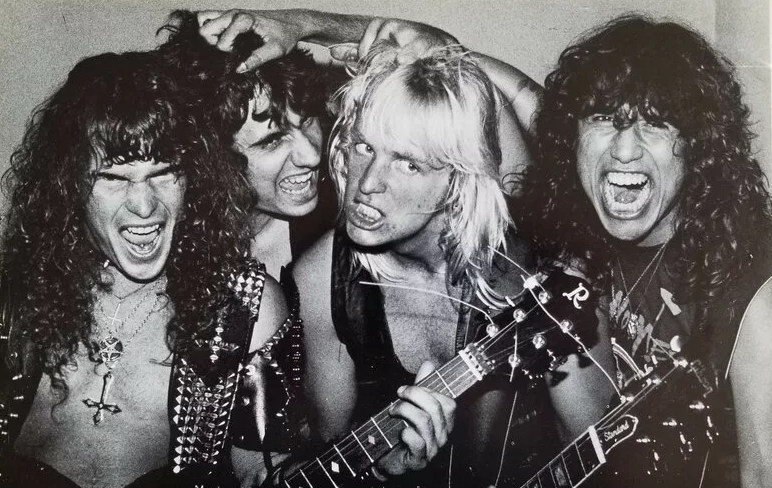
Hanneman (second from right) with Slayer in 1983

In 1981, Hanneman, who was working as a telemarketer at the time, met Kerry King, when King was auditioning for a southern rock band called "Ledger". King remembered: "As I was leaving, I saw Jeff just kinda standing around playing guitar, and he was playing stuff that I was into, like Def Leppard's 'Wasted' and AC/DC and Priest". After the try-out session, the two guitarists started talking and playing Iron Maiden and Judas Priest songs. Slayer was born when King asked "Why don't we start our own band?", to which Hanneman replied "Fuck yeah!"

Hanneman stated that he was playing guitar for a year by the time he met King and put an effort into improving his skills after watching him play. Hanneman, who was heavily influenced by hardcore punk music, got the other members into the genre, leading Slayer into a faster and more aggressive approach. The band's drummer Dave Lombardo asserted that his hardcore influences pushed him to play faster, contributing to shape his drumming style.

In 1984, Hanneman, Lombardo and Suicidal Tendencies guitarist Rocky George had a brief hardcore punk side project called "Pap Smear" – the band had many tracks and was due to start recording when Hanneman was advised to avoid the side project by Slayer's producer, Rick Rubin, who is quoted as saying "Aaaah, don't do it, man – this is the kind of thing that breaks bands up!" and Hanneman took Rubin's advice. Only a demo was recorded, consisting of Hanneman on vocals and bass, Lombardo on drums and George on guitar. Two of the songs were later re-recorded on Slayer's 1996 album Undisputed Attitude.

Early in Slayer's career, Kerry King began to be heavily influenced by English black metal band Venom, and this influence had a big impact on Hanneman's songwriting as well. Hanneman said in 1987 that although he had begun reading the Satanic bible for lyrical inspiration, he was far from a Satanist. He said his lyrics were typically antitheist in nature and that he hated the idea of Satanism as much as Christianity, calling them "the same thing". "What we're attacking, in a roundabout way, is the Christian TV conmen. It's unbelievable, the amount of money stolen in the name of Jesus", Hanneman said. While he conceded that much of the dark subject matter in his songs was "quite ridiculous", his extreme Satanic lyrics were ultimately "an easy way of offending people". Hanneman took a lot of his lyrical inspiration from books he would read. For example, he described the controversial song "Angel of Death" as "a history lesson" and that the song in no way implied he was a Nazi, saying "I'd read a lot about the Third Reich and was absolutely fascinated by the extremity of it all, the way Hitler had been able to hypnotize a nation and do whatever he wanted."

=== Illness and death ===
In early 2011, Hanneman contracted necrotizing fasciitis on one of his arms. Reports linked this illness with a spider bite he claimed to have received while in a friend's hot tub. Approximately one week later, an intoxicated Hanneman showed the arm to his wife, who recalled "...and I just freaked out when I saw (it). It was bright red and three times the normal size. I said, 'Jeff, we need to go now. We need to get you to the ER.' But all he wanted to do was go to bed and sleep...". The following morning she convinced him to seek medical attention in Loma Linda and it was learned that amputation was one possible outcome. At one point, Hanneman was placed in a medically-induced coma. Prior to surgery, hospital staff informed his wife that he may not survive. Though he did survive, his wife says the illness hindered his ability to play guitar, leading to depression "and he started to lose hope".

In light of his illness and Slayer's upcoming participation in the Australian Soundwave Festival tour that was set to begin on February 26, 2011, the band made the decision to play the dates without Hanneman, and on February 16, 2011, brought on Gary Holt (Exodus) to fill in for him. Pat O'Brien (Cannibal Corpse) joined as Slayer's temporary second guitarist when Holt left the tour to play with Exodus. In 2012, bandmate Tom Araya announced Hanneman's recovery from the infection, though a later update on the band's official website noted that it had "devastated his well-being". In February 2013, King revealed that Hanneman was still battling health issues that prevented him from performing.

Hanneman died of liver failure on May 2, 2013, in a Southern California hospital near his home. On May 9, 2013, the official cause of death was announced as alcohol-related cirrhosis. Hanneman and his family had apparently been unaware of the extent of the condition until shortly before his death. Slayer expressed shock, stating in a release that "it appeared that he had been improving – he was excited and looking forward to working on a new record." Holt eventually became Hanneman's permanent replacement in Slayer.

== Personal life ==
In 1989, Hanneman married Kathryn in Las Vegas. They had met in 1983 before the release of the debut album Show No Mercy, during a Slayer show in Buena Park, California.

Hanneman was a reserved person when he was offstage. Unlike the other members, he was very selective in socializing and rarely gave interviews. As vocalist/bassist Araya said: "If he didn't like you, he wouldn't hang with you."

=== Interest in Nazi Germany history ===
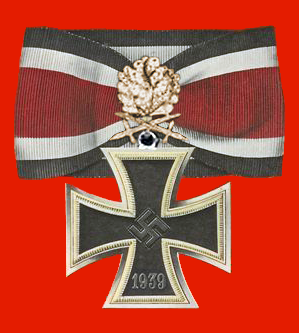
The Knight's Cross

Hanneman's interest in German war medals and Nazi Germany was illustrated by many of his lyrics. Those interests in the Wehrmacht and Waffen-SS began with medals given to him by his father, including some taken from dead German soldiers. His most prized medal was his Knight's Cross, which he had bought from a Slayer fan for $1,000. While touring with Motörhead, Hanneman discovered Motörhead vocalist Lemmy's interest in medals, and the two discussed medal designs, weapons and tactics used by the Wehrmacht.

Hanneman's lyrics for the song "Angel of Death" led to accusations of Slayer being Nazi sympathizers. Hanneman defended himself with "I know why people misinterpret it — it's because they get this knee-jerk reaction to it. When they read the lyrics, there's nothing I put in the lyrics that says necessarily [Josef Mengele] was a bad man, because to me — well, isn't that obvious? I shouldn't have to tell you that." The band has stated numerous times that they are not Nazis and do not condone Nazism.

== Influences and style ==
Hanneman's major influences included hard rock and heavy metal bands like Led Zeppelin, Iron Maiden, Judas Priest, Black Sabbath and Aerosmith, and hardcore punk acts Wasted Youth, Minor Threat, Dead Kennedys, Black Flag and T.S.O.L., which heavily influenced his contributions to Slayer's 1996 album Undisputed Attitude. Hanneman's and King's dual guitar solos have been called "wildly chaotic", and "twisted genius". South of Heaven featured "more technical" guitar riffs, utilizing the aforementioned tremolo picking and down-picked notes, improving musicianship while retaining a melodic sense. Both Hanneman and King were ranked number 10 in Guitar World's "100 Greatest Heavy Metal Guitarists of All Time".

=== Lyrics and music ===
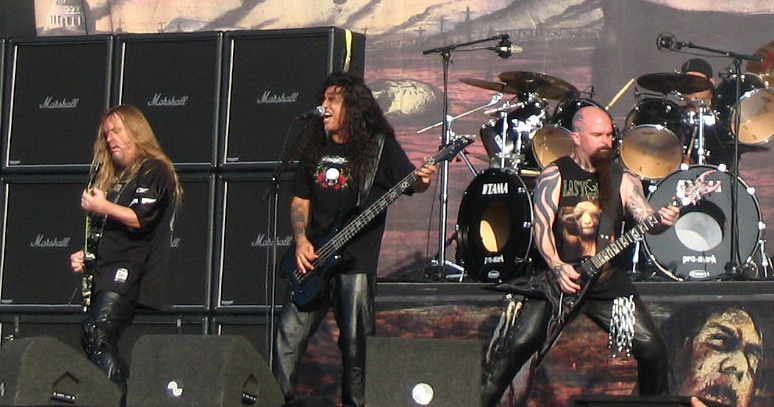
Hanneman (left) performing with Slayer at Fields of Rock 2007

Hanneman wrote the music for most of the band's fan favorites, songs such as "Angel of Death", "Raining Blood", "Die by the Sword", "South of Heaven", "War Ensemble", "Postmortem", "Dead Skin Mask" and "Seasons in the Abyss", which have all become staples for live performance at Slayer shows. Hanneman's favorite album was Reign in Blood, and he enjoyed performing the songs "Raining Blood" and "Angel of Death". He contributed lyrics and music to every Slayer album, having formed a music and lyric writing partnership with Araya, which sometimes overshadowed King's creative input. Hanneman's lyrics often dealt with taboo subject matter, he stated that the only topic he would not write lyrics about was rape.

When writing new material, the band writes the music before the lyrics. Hanneman often composed riffs at his house, using a 24-track and a drum machine and then by gathering opinions from the other band members; King and Lombardo made suggestions of alterations. The band will play the riff to get the basic song structure, and then figure out where the lyrics and solos go. Hanneman stated that writing lyrics and music is a "free for all"; "It's all just whoever comes up with what. Sometimes I'll be more on a roll and I'll have more stuff, same with Kerry – it's whoever's hot, really. Anybody can write anything; if it's good we use it, if not we don't."

=== Legacy ===
Hanneman's guitar work had a notable influence on heavy metal music and culture. Musicians such as Robb Flynn (Machine Head), Dino Cazares (Fear Factory, Divine Heresy), Mille Petrozza (Kreator), Andreas Kisser (Sepultura), Dan Lilker (Anthrax, Nuclear Assault), Eric Hoffman (Amon/Deicide), Trevor Peres (Obituary), Mark Morton (Lamb of God) and Kelly Shaefer (Atheist) cited him as an influence on their playing and songwriting. Jeff Walker said that "Hanneman's playing and riff writing and attitude has had a big impact on Carcass". Shavo Odadjian declared that "without Jeff Hanneman, there would be no System of a Down".

John Consterdine of Terrorizer magazine noted: "without Jeff Hanneman, Slayer certainly would not have created some of the most famous riffs in metal, which undoubtedly changed the entire genre". According to Jeff Kitts of Guitar World, he "influenced a generation and changed the course of metal forever". Alex Webster of Cannibal Corpse, who considers Hanneman his major influence as a composer, regarded him as "one of the greatest musicians and songwriters in metal" and Alexi Laiho of Children of Bodom described him as "one of the fathers of metal".

Alex Skolnick of Testament asserted that he "wrote some of the best riffs of all time" and "he impacted music in such a way that an entire genre will never be the same". According to Corey Taylor of Slipknot and Stone Sour, Hanneman is "one of the most underrated writers and underrated players that ever was" while Slash of Guns N' Roses and Velvet Revolver defined him "the king of thrash/speed metal guitar".

== Discography ==
- 1983: Show No Mercy
- 1984: Haunting the Chapel
- 1985: Hell Awaits
- 1986: Reign in Blood
- 1988: South of Heaven
- 1990: Seasons in the Abyss
- 1994: Divine Intervention
- 1996: Undisputed Attitude
- 1998: Diabolus in Musica
- 2001: God Hates Us All
- 2006: Christ Illusion
- 2009: World Painted Blood
- 2015: Repentless (Note: Received songwriting credits for "Piano Wire".)

== Awards ==
Hanneman won two Grammy Awards for Best Metal Performance as a member of Slayer in 2007 and 2008 for their songs "Eyes of the Insane" and "Final Six". In 2009, both he and bandmate Kerry King won the Worlds Most Mind-Blowing Guitarists award at that year Revolver Golden Gods Awards. In 2013, he was posthumously given the God of Riffs Award from the Metal Hammer Germany Awards.
