= Soundtrack to the Apocalypse =

Box set by Slayer
- Released: November 25, 2003
- Recorded: March 1983 – July 2003
- Genre: Thrash metal
- Length: 3:39:13 (Discs 1–3), 70:10 (Disc 4: DVD) 72:38 (Disc 5: Bloodpack CD)
- Label: American
- Producers: Matt Hyde, Dino Paredes, Rick Rubin, Dave Sardy, Slayer

Slayer chronology
God Hates Us All (2001)	Soundtrack to the Apocalypse (2003)	Eternal Pyre (2006)

Soundtrack to the Apocalypse is a box set by the American thrash metal band Slayer. Released November 25, 2003 through American Recordings, the three–disc CD and DVD set features music from previous albums, unreleased material, and live film. A deluxe edition version (which has the alias "ammo box") was released and featured everything from the standard edition, with the addition of 14 live tracks. The box set's name originated from an alternative title for 2001's God Hates Us All. After discussing among themselves the idea of the box set, the band informed their record company, who initially disliked but later approved the idea. A bonus disc (known as the bloodpack) was included in some versions.

Many dates were stated by band members as to when it would be released. The official release date was not announced until late October 2003. The box set has been released five times between the late 2003 and early 2007. There were several producers and film directors that were involved with the box set. The set received positive reviews from critics, but didn't debut on notable charts.

== Conception ==
Around the time Slayer thought of the album title for 2001's God Hates Us All, Soundtrack to the Apocalypse was considered an alternative name. Vocalist Tom Araya then suggested that if they ever opted to issue a box set, Soundtrack to the Apocalypse would be the most appropriate title. This inspired discussion regarding a possible box set release, which continued for several months. The group decided that once the label agreed to a release, they would be given a little more time to compile the material. Slayer approached the record company regarding a box set release, and discussions lasted roughly a year, since the band had to negotiate with the record company concerning plans they had with the box set which were not in their contract. In September 2003, the record company granted permission to issue the box set and wanted an immediate release for the holiday season.

Slayer submitted a range of material for the record company to choose from, instructing them to return a track list of what they felt to be the best items. Following this, Slayer looked at the returned material; if the recorded track was a “good” performance but the band "didn’t care for the song", they asked the record company to select another track.

Guitarist Kerry King commented "there's tons of stuff on there", citing the amount they had to choose from as a problem. King himself owned five large Tupperware storage boxes full of material amassed over the years. Having every magazine had ever seen the group inside, King also possessed roughly 70 VHS and 8mm videos dating back to 1983. Nick John of Slayer's management team sifted through every video and transferred them to DVD.

== Production ==
Soundtrack to the Apocalypse's ideal release date was in early November 2003. However, on September 25, 2003, it was announced by employees of MTV that the box set's release date had been pushed back to November 18, 2003. On October 23, 2003, employees of MTV announced that the box set's release date was pushed back to November 25, 2003. Since November 25, 2003, Slayer has released the box set five different times. The first three times were each released in 2003, the first being released through Universal Records, and the other two, one being a Deluxe Edition version, were released through American Recordings. The set's fourth release, which was packaged with only three discs, was released through American Records in 2006. The box set's final release was in 2007, where it was released through WEA International. It was also released in the United Kingdom on December 8, 2003. It was produced with three Compact Discs, one DVD, and a booklet.

The packaging was praised by PopMatters, insisting that the box set is "very nicely packaged, in a swanky fold-out digipak with a clear plastic slipcase. The 72-page accompanying booklet is outstanding, with extensive liner notes, loads of photos, and many memories from the band members." USA Today related: "[it is] a combination of the metal grinders' best-known tracks, with live and studio rarities plus 17 DVD selections. A deluxe edition ($100) adds a live disc and a few souvenir extras." Soundtrack to the Apocalypse was produced by Matt Hyde, Dino Paredes, Rick Rubin, D. Sardy, and Andy Wallace and was executively produced by Nick John and Rick Sales. The film on the fourth disc was directed by Di Puglia, Gerard. The set includes many Slayer tracks since 1986 with several rarities and b-sides, and includes a remastered DVD of live performances spanning 20 years. A fifth disc was released with fourteen more tracks than the set's standard edition. The bonus live tracks were recorded at The Grove In Anaheim, California, on May 2, 2002, several months following the return of original drummer Dave Lombardo. The extra tracks are packaged in a "blood pack" sleeve, which is decorated with faux blood and skulls.

== Reception ==
Professional ratings
Review scores
Source	Rating
411mania.com	(8.5/10)
AllMusic	4/5 stars
Mojo	4/5 stars
PopMatters	(favorable)
Q	3/5 stars
The Rolling Stone Album Guide	4/5 stars

Although it did not enter any charts, Thom Jurek from AllMusic praised Soundtrack to the Apocalypse, rewarding the box set with four out of five stars. Jurek said it had "a whopping four CDs and one DVD." Jurek noted that discs one and two "feature tracks from Reign in Blood, and all the albums that proceed from it, and includes bonus cuts previously only released in Japan, and cuts from soundtracks." He also said that the third disc "is, appropriately, titled 'Shit You Never Heard' because that's what it is — sixteen tracks that have been unissued anywhere — from rehearsals, to in-concert recordings, demos, and one 'No Remorse,' a collaboration with Atari Teenage Riot, from the Spawn soundtrack," and that the fourth disc are "an electronic press kit video for Diabolus in Musica, and an appearance at the Kerrang magazine awards." Adrien Begrand from PopMatters favoured the album, lauding the packaging but stating that "like any other CD box set that has come out in recent years, the band seems torn about whom to appeal to, longtime fans, or newcomers." Begrand noted that the first disc "is especially great, as it captures Slayer at the peak of their career, starting with the classic 1986 album Reign in Blood." PR Newswire said it was "a Slayer fan's ultimate experience," and The Dallas Morning News called it "a fat new audiovisual box set."

== Track listing ==
Disc one: Best of
No.	Title	Lyrics	Music	Original album	Length
1.	"Angel of Death"	Jeff Hanneman	Hanneman	Reign in Blood	4:50
2.	"Criminally Insane" (remix)	Hanneman; Kerry King	Hanneman; King	Reign in Blood (re-issue)	3:07
3.	"Postmortem"	Hanneman	Hanneman	Reign in Blood	3:27
4.	"Raining Blood"	Hanneman; King	Hanneman	Reign in Blood	4:12
5.	"Aggressive Perfector"	Hanneman; King	Hanneman; King	Reign in Blood (re-issue)	2:28
6.	"South of Heaven"	Tom Araya	Hanneman	South of Heaven	4:45
7.	"Silent Scream"	Araya	Hanneman; King	South of Heaven	3:05
8.	"Live Undead"	Araya; King	Hanneman	South of Heaven	3:50
9.	"Mandatory Suicide"	Araya	Hanneman; King	South of Heaven	4:04
10.	"Spill the Blood"	Hanneman	Hanneman	South of Heaven	4:49
11.	"War Ensemble"	Araya; Hanneman	Hanneman	Seasons in the Abyss	4:51
12.	"Dead Skin Mask"	Araya	Hanneman	Seasons in the Abyss	5:16
13.	"Hallowed Point"	Araya; Hanneman	Hanneman; King	Seasons in the Abyss	3:24
14.	"Born of Fire"	King	Hanneman; King	Seasons in the Abyss	3:07
15.	"Seasons in the Abyss"	Araya	Hanneman	Seasons in the Abyss	6:26
16.	"Hell Awaits" (live)	King	Hanneman; King	Decade of Aggression	6:49
17.	"The Antichrist" (live)	Hanneman	Hanneman; King	Decade of Aggression	3:11
18.	"Chemical Warfare" (live)	Hanneman; King	Hanneman; King	Decade of Aggression	5:25

Disc two: Best of / International Bonus Tracks / Soundtrack Contributions
No.	Title	Lyrics	Music	Original album	Length
1.	"Sex. Murder. Art."	Araya	King	Divine Intervention	1:50
2.	"Dittohead"	King	King	Divine Intervention	2:30
3.	"Divine Intervention"	Araya; Hanneman; King; Paul Bostaph	Hanneman; King	Divine Intervention	5:32
4.	"Serenity in Murder"	Araya	Hanneman; King	Divine Intervention	2:36
5.	"213"	Araya	Hanneman	Divine Intervention	4:51
6.	"Can't Stand You"	Hanneman	Hanneman	Undisputed Attitude	1:27
7.	"Ddamm"	Hanneman	Hanneman	Undisputed Attitude	1:01
8.	"Gemini"	Araya	King	Undisputed Attitude	4:51
9.	"Bitter Peace"	Hanneman	Hanneman	Diabolus in Musica	4:31
10.	"Death's Head"	Hanneman	Hanneman	Diabolus in Musica	3:29
11.	"Stain of Mind"	King	Hanneman	Diabolus in Musica	3:24
12.	"Disciple"	King	Hanneman	God Hates Us All	3:35
13.	"God Send Death"	Araya; Hanneman	Hanneman	God Hates Us All	3:45
14.	"New Faith"	King	King	God Hates Us All	3:05
15.	"In-A-Gadda-Da-Vida" (Iron Butterfly cover)	Doug Ingle	Ingle	Less than Zero	3:16
16.	"Disorder" (The Exploited cover, featuring Ice-T)	Araya; King; Ice-T; Wattie Buchan; Big John Duncan; Gary MacCormack	Buchan; Duncan; MacCormack	Judgment Night	4:56
17.	"Memories of Tomorrow" (Suicidal Tendencies cover)	Mike Muir; Louiche Mayorga	Muir; Mayorga	Undisputed Attitude (Japanese edition)	0:53
18.	"Human Disease"	Araya; Hanneman; King	Araya; Hanneman; King	Bride of Chucky	4:20
19.	"Unguarded Instinct"	King	Hanneman	Diabolus in Musica (Japanese edition)	3:44
20.	"Wicked"	Araya; Bostaph	Hanneman; King	Diabolus in Musica (European & Japanese edition)	6:03
21.	"Addict"	King	Hanneman	God Hates Us All (Japanese & Collector's edition)	3:41
22.	"Scarstruck"	King	King	God Hates Us All (Japanese & Collector's edition)	3:31

Disc three: Rare Tracks / Live
No.	Title	Lyrics	Music	Recorded	Length
1.	"Ice Titan" (live)	Hanneman	Hanneman	March 1983, California	4:18
2.	"The Antichrist" (rehearsal)	Hanneman	Hanneman; King	December 1983, Tom Araya's Garage	2:53
3.	"Fight till Death" (rehearsal)	Hanneman	Hanneman	December 1983, Tom Araya's Garage	3:30
4.	"Necrophiliac" (live)	Hanneman; King	Hanneman	September 1985, California	5:00
5.	"Piece by Piece" (rough mix, includes bass guitar intro)	King	King	Reign in Blood studio sessions	2:13
6.	"Raining Blood" (live)	Hanneman; King	Hanneman	November 1986, Canada	3:09
7.	"Angel of Death" (live)	Hanneman	Hanneman	November 1986, Canada	4:58
8.	"Raining Blood" (Jeff Hanneman home recording)	Hanneman; King	Hanneman	1986, Jeff Hanneman's home	2:00
9.	"South of Heaven" (Jeff Hanneman home recording)	Araya	Hanneman	1988, Jeff Hanneman's home	3:29
10.	"Seasons in the Abyss" (live)	Araya	Hanneman	June 1991, Michigan	6:43
11.	"Mandatory Suicide" (live)	Araya	Hanneman; King	June 1991, Michigan	3:59
12.	"Mind Control" (live)	Araya; King	Hanneman; King	Brazil, 1994	3:05
13.	"No Remorse (I Wanna Die)" (with Atari Teenage Riot)	Araya; Hanin Elias	Hanneman; King; Alec Empire	Spawn: The Album	4:15
14.	"Dittohead" (live)	King	King	May 1998, California	3:03
15.	"Sex. Murder. Art." (live)	Araya	King	May 1998, California	2:22
16.	"Bloodline" (live)	Araya; Hanneman	Hanneman; King	Hultsfred Festival, Sweden, 2002	4:02
17.	"Payback" (live)	King	King	Hultsfred Festival, Sweden, 2002	6:39

Disc four: DVD (Various Live Performances / TV Performances)
No.	Title	Filmed	Length
1.	"Die by the Sword" (live)	March 1983 in California
2.	"Aggressive Perfector" (live)	1983 in California
3.	"Praise of Death" (live)	September 1984 in California
4.	"Haunting the Chapel" (live)	May 1985 in Sweden
5.	"Necrophobic" (live)	1986 in New York
6.	"Reborn" (live)	1986 in New York
7.	"Jesus Saves" (live)	1986 in New York
8.	"War Ensemble" (live)	June 1991 in Michigan
9.	"South of Heaven" (live)	June 1991 in Michigan
10.	"Dead Skin Mask" (live)	June 1991 in Michigan
11.	"Gemini" (live)	August 1996 in California
12.	"Kerrang! Magazine Awards '96: Heaviest Band Award"	Kerrang! Magazine Awards '96
13.	"EPK for Diabolus in Musica"
14.	"Stain of Mind" (live)	July 1998 in Tokyo, Japan
15.	"Bloodline" (live)	April 2002 by ESPN
16.	"Disciple" (live)	July 2003 in France
17.	"God Send Death" (live)	July 2003 in France

Disc five: (Deluxe Edition) - Live Bloodpack CD, Live at The Grove in Anaheim (May 2, 2002)
No.	Title	Lyrics	Music	Length
1.	"Darkness of Christ" (live)	King	Hanneman	1:48
2.	"Disciple" (live)	King	Hanneman	4:30
3.	"War Ensemble" (live)	Araya; Hanneman	Hanneman	5:40
4.	"Stain of Mind" (live)	King	Hanneman	3:59
5.	"Postmortem" (live)	Hanneman	Hanneman	4:20
6.	"Raining Blood" (live)	Hanneman; King	Hanneman	3:25
7.	"Hell Awaits" (live)	King	Hanneman; King	7:14
8.	"At Dawn They Sleep" (live)	Araya; Hanneman; King	Hanneman	7:44
9.	"Dead Skin Mask" (live)	Araya	Hanneman	6:32
10.	"Seasons in the Abyss" (live)	Araya	Hanneman	4:32
11.	"Mandatory Suicide" (live)	Araya	Hanneman; King	5:13
12.	"Chemical Warfare" (live)	Hanneman; King	Hanneman; King	7:00
13.	"South of Heaven" (live)	Araya	Hanneman	4:32
14.	"Angel of Death" (live)	Hanneman	Hanneman	6:18

== Personnel ==
Slayer

- Tom Araya – bass, vocals
- Jeff Hanneman – guitar
- Kerry King – guitar
- Dave Lombardo – drums on disc #1 tracks 1–18, disc #2 track 15, disc #3 tracks 1–7, 10–11 and 16–17, disc #4 tracks 1–10 and 15–17, disc #5 tracks 1–14
- Paul Bostaph – drums on disc #2 tracks 1–14 and 16–22, disc #3 tracks 12 and 14–15, disc #4 track 14
- Jon Dette – drums on disc #4 track 11

Additional musician

- Matt Polish – voice on "Dead Skin Mask"

Production

- Nich John – DVD producer
- Kevin Estrada – photography
- Rick Rubin – American recordings
- Dino Paredes – American recordings
- Vlado Meller – mastering
- Steve Kadison – mastering-assistant
- Adam Abrams – project coordination
- Jeff Fura – DVD producer
- Kelly McFadden – DVD menu design
- Dave Wright – DVD authoring
- Scott Sill – DVD authoring
- Paul Kirsch – DVD editing
- George Fitz – DVD editing
- Vartan – art direction
- t42design – art direction, design
- Mark Weiss – photography
- Doug Goodman Archive – photography
- Slayer Archives – audio & visual materials
- Marc Paschke – essay & liner notes
- Eric Braverman – essay & liner notes
