= List of awards and nominations received by Slayer =

Slayer awards and nominations
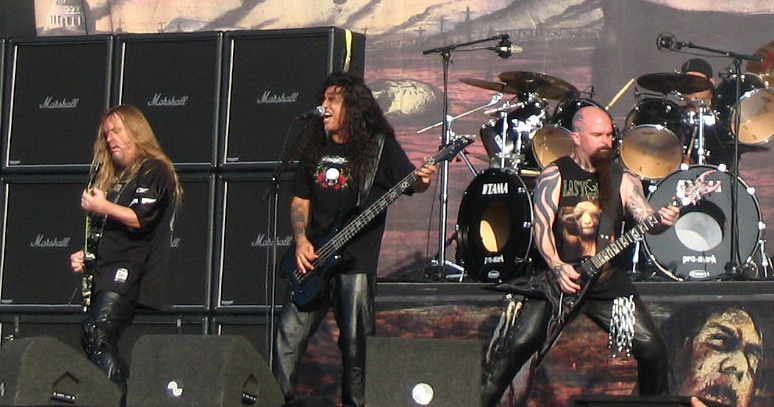
- Slayer's original lineup performing at Fields of Rock in 2007; From left to right: Jeff Hanneman, Tom Araya, Kerry King and Dave Lombardo
Awards and nominations
Award	Wins	Nominations

Totals (Note: Certain award groups do not simply award one winner. They acknowledge several different recipients, have runners-up, and have third place. Since this is a specific recognition and is different from losing an award, runner-up mentions are considered wins in this award tally. For simplification and to avoid errors, each award in this list has been presumed to have had a prior nomination.)
- Wins: 19
- Nominations: 37

Slayer is an American Grammy Award-winning thrash metal band formed in 1981 in Huntington Park, California. The group is considered one of the leaders of the thrash metal scene from the 1980s and is part of the "Big Four" of the genre, along with Metallica, Megadeth and Anthrax. They received various accolades throughout their career for contributions to metal music.

== Bonzo Bash ==
Year	Nominee / work	Award	Result
2015	Dave Lombardo	Legend Award	Won

== Decibel Hall of Fame ==
Year	Nominee / work	Award	Result
2004	Reign in Blood	Decibel Hall of Fame	Won
2013	South of Heaven	Decibel Hall of Fame	Won

== Grammy Awards ==
Year	Nominee / work	Award	Result
2002	"Disciple"	Best Metal Performance	Nominated
2007	"Eyes of the Insane"	Best Metal Performance	Won
2008	"Final Six"	Best Metal Performance	Won
2010	"Hate Worldwide"	Best Metal Performance	Nominated
2011	"World Painted Blood"	Best Metal Performance	Nominated

== Kerrang! Awards ==
Year	Nominee / work	Award	Result
2006	Slayer	Kerrang! Hall of Fame	Won
2013	Slayer	Kerrang! Legend	Won

== Loudwire Music Awards ==
Year	Nominee / work	Award	Result
2015	"Repentless"	Death Match Hall of Fame	Won
2015	"Repentless"	Best Metal Video	Won
2015	"Repentless"	Best Metal Song	Nominated
2015	Repentless	Best Metal Album	Nominated
2016	"You Against You"	Best Metal Video	Nominated

== Metal Edge Readers' Choice Awards ==
Year	Nominee / work	Award	Result
2003	War at the Warfield	DVD of the Year	Won

== Metal Hammer Awards (Germany) ==
Year	Nominee / work	Award	Result
2010	Kerry King	God of Riffs	Won
2013	Jeff Hanneman	God of Riffs	Won
2018	Slayer	Best Live Act	Nominated

== Metal Hammer Golden Gods Awards (UK) ==
Year	Nominee / work	Award	Result
2004	Slayer	Best Live Act	Won
2006	Reign in Blood	Best Album of the Last 20 Years	Won
2007	"Eyes of Silence"	Best Video	Nominated
2007	Slayer	Icon Award	Won
2007	Slayer	Best International Band	Nominated
2008	Kerry King	Golden God	Won
2016	Slayer	Best International Band	Nominated
2016	"Repentless"	Best Video	Nominated

== Metal Storm Awards ==
Year	Nominee / work	Award	Result
2006	Christ Illusion	Best Thrash Metal Album	Won
2009	World Painted Blood	Best Thrash Metal Album	Nominated
2015	"Repentless"	Best Video	Won
2015	Repentless	Best Thrash Metal Album	Nominated

== Revolver Golden Gods Awards ==
Year	Nominee / work	Award	Result
2009	Jeff Hanneman and Kerry King	World Most Mind-Blowing Guitarists	Won
2010	Slayer	Best Live Band	Nominated
2010	World Painted Blood	Album of the Year	Nominated
2010	Dave Lombardo	Drummer of the Year	Nominated
2014	Slayer	Best Live Band	Nominated
2016	"Pride in Prejudice"	Best Film and Video	Nominated
