= Decade of Aggression =

Live album by Slayer
- Released: October 22, 1991
- Recorded: July 13, 1991; March 8, 1991; October 14, 1990
- Venues: Lakeland Civic Center (Lakeland, Florida); Orange Pavilion (San Bernardino, California); Wembley Arena (London)
- Genre: Thrash metal
- Length: 89:17
- Label: Def American
- Producer: Rick Rubin

Slayer chronology
Seasons in the Abyss (1990)	Decade of Aggression (1991)	Divine Intervention (1994)

Decade of Aggression is a double live album by Slayer, released on October 22, 1991, through Def American Records (later renamed to American Recordings) and produced by Rick Rubin. The album was recorded in three separate places on three separate dates. Its working title was Decade of Decadence until Mötley Crüe registered the name. Three of the album's tracks were included in the box set Soundtrack to the Apocalypse. The album's reception was generally positive, with Entertainment Weekly and Robert Christgau both giving the album a positive rating. The album reached number 55 in the Billboard 200 and also charted on two other charts.

== Conception ==
While touring on the Clash of the Titans tour to promote the 1990 studio album Seasons in the Abyss, separate sections of the Decade of Aggression album were recorded on October 14, 1990, March 8, 1991, and July 13, 1991. However, AllMusic said that Rick Rubin's production "seems to be in terms of shaping the live sound to make it sound like this is all one gig." Although it had a working title of Decade of Decadence, it would be released as Decade of Aggression after Mötley Crüe copyrighted the name on their 1991 greatest hits album. It was released through Def American Recordings on October 22, 1991.

The main disc was [disc] one and then we had other songs that we played a different night that we added to the package, and that was our first live experience, the first anyone could have Slayer live unless it was a tape-trading kind of thing from way back when. So it was kinda cool, you know, we were proud of it.

— Kerry King

The release was intended to give them time to decide what their next album's style would be. Text in the book The Great Rock Discography said that it was released after the band had gained popularity, saying "Slayer had finally made it into the metal big league and summing up the first blood-soaked chapter of their career, the group duly released the live double set." It was also released to commemorate their 10th anniversary.

The album does not feature an overdub of guitars. In The Rough Guide To Rock, it was said to be "intense" and "put studio favorites through the live shredder in a brutal and definitive manner." Most of the tracks were a selection from South of Heaven, Reign in Blood, and Seasons in the Abyss. The album's total duration is one hour, twenty-five minutes, and twenty-eight seconds (85:28). Three of the album's tracks were included in the box set Soundtrack to the Apocalypse.

The album booklet includes a photo gallery with pictures dating back to 1982. The majority of the photos come from Kevin Estrada, who has said:

Usually I choose my favorite shots that I've taken, and then I give them to the band and they choose the ones they like best. It's funny, because you'd think Slayer would have a definite vision for what they want to do with the photos, but they don't. I say 'What do you want to do?' and they say 'I don't know, what do you want to do?' But it works well, because everything I do they're happy with. They like to work quick — they don't want to do any two-hour photo shoots — and our personalities work really well, because I work quickly too.

== Reception ==
Professional ratings
Review scores
Source	Rating
AllMusic	3/5 stars
Entertainment Weekly	B−
Q	4/5 stars
Robert Christgau	(1-star Honorable Mention)
The Rolling Stone Album Guide	3/5 stars
Spin Alternative Record Guide	5/10

Thom Jurek, a staff writer for AllMusic, gave the album a rating of three out of five stars. Jurek gave notice to the album's sound quality, telling readers that it does not "capture the sheer overblown intensity of the unit in a concert setting," but that it comes closer than one may imagine. Jurek also gave note to how Rick Rubin made the two-discs sound like they were recorded at one gig, writing "Producer Rick Rubin stays out of the way; his production seems to be in terms of shaping the live sound to make it sound like this is all one gig." Entertainment Weekly's David Browne said that it was an "accurate aural snapshot of what it's like to be part of a crowd craning to see the action on a stage that seems two miles away." Browne also said that "they're perfect examples of the sad current state of the once-proud live rock album." Robert Christgau gave the album a star ("Honorable Mention is a worthy effort consumers attuned to its overriding aesthetic or individual vision may well like."), saying, "praise the Lord—I can hardly understand a word they're singing (Hell Awaits)." Joel McIver, author of The Bloody Reign of Slayer said that it was regarded as one of the best live albums released by a heavy metal band.

The album charted on three different charts. On November 9, 1991, it peaked at number 55 on the Billboard 200. On January 13, 1992, the album entered the Media Control Charts. It peaked at number 35. It maintained a number on the chart until February 2, 1992, giving it a total of three weeks on the chart. On December 2, 1991, it entered the UK Album Charts, peaking at number 29. It stayed on the chart for two weeks.

== Track listing ==
=== Standard edition ===
==== Disc one ====
- All songs recorded at the Lakeland Civic Center in Lakeland, Florida, on July 13, 1991.

No.	Title	Lyrics	Music	Length
1.	"Hell Awaits"	Kerry King	Jeff Hanneman; King	6:50
2.	"The Anti-Christ"	Hanneman	Hanneman; King	3:50
3.	"War Ensemble"	Tom Araya; Hanneman	Hanneman	4:58
4.	"South of Heaven"	Araya	Hanneman	4:25
5.	"Raining Blood"	Hanneman; King	Hanneman	2:32
6.	"Altar of Sacrifice"	King	Hanneman	2:48
7.	"Jesus Saves"	King	Hanneman; King	4:12
8.	"Dead Skin Mask"	Araya	Hanneman	4:58
9.	"Seasons in the Abyss"	Araya	Hanneman	7:01
10.	"Mandatory Suicide"	Araya	Hanneman; King	4:00
11.	"Angel of Death"	Hanneman	Hanneman	4:52
Total length:				50:26

==== Disc two ====
- Tracks 3–6 and 8–10 recorded at the Orange Pavilion in San Bernardino, California, on March 8, 1991.
- Tracks 1, 2 and 7 recorded at the Wembley Arena in London on October 14, 1990.

No.	Title	Lyrics	Music	Length
1.	"Hallowed Point"	Araya; Hanneman	Hanneman; King	3:36
2.	"Blood Red"	Araya	Hanneman	2:50
3.	"Die by the Sword"	Hanneman	Hanneman	3:35
4.	"Black Magic"	King	Hanneman; King	3:28
5.	"Captor of Sin"	Hanneman; King	Hanneman; King	3:34
6.	"Born of Fire"	King	Hanneman; King	3:03
7.	"Postmortem"	Hanneman	Hanneman	4:04
8.	"Spirit in Black"	King	Hanneman	4:07
9.	"Expendable Youth"	Araya	King	4:36
10.	"Chemical Warfare"	Hanneman; King	Hanneman; King	5:30
Total length:				38:23

=== Japanese edition and 1992 reissue limited edition ===
- Disc one track listing remains the same.
- Disc two track listing 1–6 and 9-12 remains the same.
- Track 7 recorded at the Orange Pavilion, San Bernardino, California, March 8, 1991.
- Track 8 recorded at the Wembley Arena, London, England, October 14, 1990.

No.	Title	Lyrics	Music	Length
7.	"Skeletons of Society"	King	King	4:50
8.	"At Dawn They Sleep"	Araya; Hanneman; King	Hanneman	6:26
9.	"Postmortem"	Hanneman	Hanneman	4:04
10.	"Spirit in Black"	King	Hanneman	4:07
11.	"Expendable Youth"	Araya	King	4:36
12.	"Chemical Warfare"	Hanneman; King	Hanneman; King	5:30
Total length:				49:39

== Personnel ==
Personnel taken from the album's liner notes.

Slayer

- Tom Araya – bass, vocals
- Jeff Hanneman – guitars
- Kerry King – guitars
- Dave Lombardo – drums

Production

- Rick Rubin – producer
- Slayer – co-producers, design
- Peter J. Yianilos – recording engineer (Lakeland)
- Mike Carver – recording engineer (Orange Pavilion)
- Tim Summerhayes – recording engineer (Wembley)
- Doug Field – 2nd engineer (Orange Pavilion)
- Phil Kneebone – 2nd engineer (Orange Pavilion)
- Roland Young – assistant engineer (Wembley)
- Brendan O'Brien – mix engineer
- Jim Champagne – assistant mix engineer
- Bill Dawes – remixing
- Howie Weinberg – mastering
- Rick Sales – design
- Renay Palome – design
- Michael Lavine – principal photography
- Kevin Estrada – additional photos
- Mark Leialoha – additional photos
- Alex Solca – additional photos

== Charts ==
Chart performance for Decade of Aggression
Chart (1991)	Peak position
Australian Albums (ARIA)	83
Austrian Albums (Ö3 Austria)	83
Canada Top Albums/CDs (RPM)	81
Dutch Albums (Album Top 100)	79
German Albums (Offizielle Top 100)	35
UK Albums (Official Charts)	29
US Billboard 200	55
