= Live Intrusion =

Video by Slayer
- Released: October 31, 1995 (VHS); August 17, 2010 (DVD)
- Recorded: March 12, 1995
- Venues: Mesa Amphitheatre (Mesa, AZ)
- Genre: Thrash metal
- Length: 58:35
- Label: American
- Director: Phil Tuckett

Slayer chronology
Live Intrusion (1995)	War at the Warfield (2003)

Live Intrusion is a home video by Slayer which was released in 1995 through American Recordings and filmed at the Mesa Amphitheatre in Mesa, Arizona, on March 12, 1995. The video features a cover of the Venom song "Witching Hour" performed by Slayer with assistance from Chris Kontos and Robb Flynn of Machine Head. It was reissued on DVD on August 17, 2010. Live Intrusion received positive reception from the few critics that reviewed the video.

== Conception ==
Live Intrusion was filmed at the Mesa Amphitheatre in Mesa, Arizona, on March 12, 1995, while promoting Divine Intervention on tour. The Machine Head members Chris Kontos and Robb Flynn gave assistance to the band while performing "Witching Hour", originally recorded by Venom in 1981. The video was released as a VHS (Video High Standard) through American Recordings on October 31, 1995. The video features live footage of Slayer and exclusive unseen footage of Slayer on and off the road. The beginning of the video features a portrait of some of Slayer fans, including a picture from the mid-1990s, about a fan, who had "Slayer" carved onto their forearm. It was directed and produced by Phil Tuckett, with the audio recorded by Sylvia Massy. On August 17, 2010, Live Intrusion was remastered and released as a DVD (Digital Video Disc). It was created using the original VHS master and edited the footage with newer technology. The DVD was sold at retail and online for (USD) $13.98. The DVD was also released in the Slayer Live DVD 3-Pak, also released on August 17, 2010. It was sold for (USD) $29.98.

== Critical reception ==
Chris Beaumont of Blogcritics recommended the DVD to consumers, giving it three and a half out of five stars. He noted that the audio quality was "pretty strong," and allows listeners to clearly hear every chord, note, and word that the band outputs, while the crowd noise proves that it is a live video, but is not so loud that it distracts viewers. Beamount also said that the video's quality "lacks a lot of the polish that more recent recordings have," but he later said that he would rather see it in low quality rather than high quality. Chad Bowar of About.com also gave the DVD three and a half out of five stars. He noted that the video is in decent quality, but, due to poor lighting and shaky camera work, he considered the DVD to be "marginal."

== Track listing ==
1. "Raining Blood" (Hanneman, King) — 4:23
2. "Killing Fields" (Araya, King) — 3:56
3. "War Ensemble" (Araya, Hanneman) — 4:51
4. "At Dawn They Sleep" (Araya, Hanneman, King) — 5:03
5. "Divine Intervention" (Araya, Bostaph, Hanneman, King) — 5:33
6. "Dittohead" (King) — 2:50
7. "Captor of Sin" (Hanneman, King) — 3:21
8. "213" (Araya, Hanneman) — 4:51
9. "South of Heaven" (Araya, Hanneman) — 4:58
10. "Sex. Murder. Art." (Araya, King) — 1:50
11. "Mandatory Suicide" (Araya, Hanneman, King) — 4:03
12. "Angel of Death" (Hanneman) — 4:50
13. "Hell Awaits" (Hanneman, King) — 4:53
14. "Witching Hour" (Venom cover) — 2:54
15. "Chemical Warfare" (Hanneman, King) — 5:17
- Source: Setlist.fm

== Personnel ==
Slayer

- Tom Araya – bass, vocals, producer
- Jeff Hanneman – guitar
- Kerry King – guitar, producer
- Paul Bostaph – drums

Additional musicians

- Chris Kontos – drums on the Venom cover "Witching Hour"
- Robb Flynn – rhythm guitar and vocals on the Venom cover "Witching Hour"

Production

- Phil Tuckett – director
- Rick Rubin – executive producer
- Dexter Gresch – editor
- Thom Panunzio – mixer
- Wes Benscoter – front cover illustration
- Neil Zlozower – photography
- Kevin Estrada – photography
- Dirk Walter – design

Source: both Allmusic and the video's notes.
