= South of Heaven =

Studio album by Slayer
- Released: July 5, 1988
- Recorded: December 1987 – February 1988
- Studios: Hit City West (Los Angeles); Chung King (New York City)
- Genre: Thrash metal
- Length: 36:54
- Label: Def Jam
- Producers: Rick Rubin; Slayer

Slayer chronology
Reign in Blood (1986)	South of Heaven (1988)	Seasons in the Abyss (1990)

Singles from South of Heaven
- 1. "South of Heaven" Released: 1988; 2. "Mandatory Suicide" Released: 1988

South of Heaven is the fourth studio album by American thrash metal band Slayer, released on July 5, 1988, by Def Jam Recordings. Given the frenetic pace of Reign in Blood, Slayer made no attempt to top it on South of Heaven. Rather, the band offset and complemented Reign in Blood by deliberately slowing the tempo down on South of Heaven, as well as by utilizing undistorted guitars and toned-down vocals.

It was the second Slayer album to be produced by Rick Rubin and the last to be released by Def Jam, although the rights were transferred to Rubin's new label Def American Recordings after Rubin ended his partnership with Russell Simmons. The album was one of only two Def Jam titles to be distributed by Geffen Records through Warner Bros. Records, as Def Jam's then-distributor Columbia Records refused to release material by the band.

South of Heaven received critical acclaim, with some praising the change in the band's sound, while others more accustomed to the style of their earlier efforts were somewhat disappointed. Nonetheless, it became the band's second album to enter the Billboard 200, peaking at number 57, and was certified gold by the Recording Industry Association of America (RIAA) in 1992. The songs "Mandatory Suicide" and the title track have since become near constant fixtures in the band's live setlist.

== Background ==
The album was recorded in Los Angeles with Reign in Blood producer Rick Rubin. PopMatters reviewer Adrien Begrand observed that Rubin's production "shoves [Dave] Lombardo's drumming right up front in the mix". Guitarist Jeff Hanneman has since said that South of Heaven was the only album the band members discussed before writing the music. Aware that they "couldn't top Reign in Blood", and that whatever they recorded would be compared to the album, he believed they "had to slow down", something Slayer had never done on albums before, or since. Guitarist Kerry King cited the need to "keep people guessing" as another reason for the musical shift. "In order to contrast the aggressive assault put forth on Reign in Blood, Slayer consciously slowed down the tempo of the album as a whole", according to Slayer's official biography. "They also added elements like undistorted guitars and toned-down vocal styles not heard on previous albums."

King has since been critical of his performance, which he describes as his "most lackluster". King attributes this to the fact he had recently married, and moved to Phoenix, Arizona. Describing himself as "probably the odd man out at that point", he stated he "didn't participate as much because of that". Hanneman said: "We go through dry spells sometimes, but the good thing about having two guitar players that can write music is that you are never gonna go without. I guess at that time, Kerry was hitting a dry spell." King has also been critical of the album in general, describing it as one of his least favorite Slayer albums. He felt vocalist Tom Araya moved too far away from his regular vocal style, and "added too much singing". Drummer Dave Lombardo has since observed: "There was fire on all the records, but it started dimming when South of Heaven came into the picture. And that's me personally. Again, I was probably wanting something else."

Judas Priest's "Dissident Aggressor" is the first cover version to appear on a Slayer studio album. The song was chosen due to its war-themed lyrics. Hanneman described the track as "more just like one of those odd songs that a lot of people didn't know, but it was a favorite of Kerry and I, so we just picked that one". Meanwhile, "Cleanse the Soul" has been heavily criticized by King who said that he hates the track: "That's one of the black marks in our history, in my book. I just fucking think it's horrible. [Laughs] I hate the opening riff. It's what we call a 'happy riff.' It's just like 'la-lala-la-la-la.' I can't see myself playing it, but after that, where it gets heavier, I like that section. If we ever did a medley, I'd put part of that in there." The closing track "Spill The Blood" features clean guitar tones in the beginning and middle sections, and Araya's singing capabilities.

== Photography and illustration ==
Artist Larry Carroll and illustrator Howard Schwartzberg designed the cover artwork for South of Heaven, having designed the artwork for Slayer's previous album Reign in Blood. Photographer Glen E. Friedman took the promotional shot which surfaced as the back cover of South of Heaven around the time of 1986's Reign in Blood. Lombardo felt it made Slayer seem as though they "had matured a little bit", while Friedman himself deemed it "a really cool back cover" and "one of the most classic shots of them [Slayer] ever".

The artwork shown on the front cover was inspired by KNM-ER 1470, an incomplete skull of an archaic human of the extinct species Homo rudolfensis that was discovered in 1972 in Kenya.

== Critical reception ==
Professional ratings
Review scores
Source	Rating
AllMusic	4/5 stars
Robert Christgau	B−
Collector's Guide to Heavy Metal	10/10
Kerrang!	5/5 stars
Metal Forces	8/10
Rock Hard	8.5/10
Rolling Stone	1/5 stars
The Rolling Stone Album Guide	4/5 stars
Spin Alternative Record Guide	8/10

South of Heaven was released on July 5, 1988, and was the final Slayer album distributed via Def Jam Records. When label co-founders Russell Simmons and Rubin parted ways, Slayer signed to Rubin's newly founded Def American Recordings label. The album peaked at number 57 on the Billboard 200 album chart; on November 20, 1992, it became Slayer's second album to be certified gold in the United States. South of Heaven was awarded silver certification in the United Kingdom on January 1, 1993, Slayer's first record to do so in that country. Slayer's official biography states that "some critics praised the album as demonstrating Slayer's desire to grow musically and avoid repeating themselves." Alex Henderson of AllMusic described the record as "disturbing and powerful," while Joe Matera of Ultimate Guitar deemed the album a slight departure; he wrote that while the pace was slowed down, it "didn't sacrifice any of the heaviness inherent in Slayer's music".

Reviewing the 2003 Slayer box set Soundtrack to the Apocalypse, Adrien Begrand of PopMatters described the album as "their most underrated, and on this set, its five selections show how highly the band thinks of the record". KNAC.com's Peter Atkinson was also positive, saying the album has a "grandiosity and imposing presence" which makes the record "so magnificent". Grave's Ola Lindgren and Bolt Thrower's Karl Willetts both rate South of Heaven as amongst the top five albums of all time, while Max Kolesne of Brazilian death metal group Krisiun remembers hearing the song "Silent Scream" for the first time: "It just blew me away. It was like fast double-bass, fast kicks during the whole song. That was very inspiring for me." When discussing Slayer in an October 2007 interview, Evile frontman Matt Drake stated that while Reign in Blood "was just speed", South of Heaven proved that the group could write "slow material as well". Metal Forces reviewer gives "the band credit for at least making an effort to try something new and not being afraid to experiment at such a crucial stage of their career", creating "one of the more original sounding thrash / speed metal albums he heard in a long while". He remarked, however, that "if you're expecting to hear Reign in Blood Part Two, you'll be in for a major disappointment".

Kim Neely of Rolling Stone dismissed the album as "genuinely offensive satanic drivel". However, the magazine would later rank the album 47th on their 2017 "100 Greatest Metal Albums of All Time" list. Slayer's official biography states: "The new sounds disappointed some of the band's fans who were more accustomed to the style of earlier releases." Michael Roberts of Westworld Online said this was due to some of the numbers moving "at the sludgier speed of Black Sabbath". Araya commented that the "album was a late bloomer—it wasn't really received well, but it kind of grew on everybody later". Decibel inducted South of Heaven into the Decibel Magazine Hall of Fame in January 2013. Due to Jeff Hanneman's death in May of the same year, South of Heaven would be the second and final classic Slayer album to receive an induction into Decibel's Hall of Fame.

== Cover versions ==
Dissident Aggressor
Slayer covered Judas Priest's "Dissident Aggressor" due to its war themed lyrics, and being a favorite song of Slayer's two guitarists.

The title track and the song "Mandatory Suicide" have received various cover interpretations, particularly on Slayer tribute albums. Toni Ferguson recorded string quartet adaptations of both tracks on the album The String Quartet Tribute to Slayer: The Evil You Dread, with "South of Heaven" being described as having "menacing chord shifts" by AllMusic's Johnny Loftus.

1995 Slayer tribute album Slatanic Slaughter featured three songs which originally appeared on South of Heaven, with "South of Heaven", "Mandatory Suicide" and "Spill the Blood" interpreted by Cemetary, Crown of Thornz and Grope, respectively. Its 1996 follow up Slatanic Slaughter, Vol. 2 only featured two tracks originally from the album: "Silent Scream", arranged by Vader, and "Read Between the Lies", interpreted by Anathema. 1999's Straight to Hell: A Tribute to Slayer collected four Slayer renditions which originated on the album, with versions of "South of Heaven" performed by Abaddon, (Venom) and Electric Hellfire Club, "Mandatory Suicide" cut by Chapter 7 and "Behind the Crooked Cross" adapted by Gigantor. The 2006 Argentine tribute album Al Sur Del Abismo (Tributo Argentino A Slayer) saw Nafak and Climatic Terra also respectively cover "South of Heaven" and "Mandatory Suicide".

== Live performances ==
Two songs taken from the album ("Mandatory Suicide" and "South of Heaven") have become near constant fixtures in the band's live setlist, notching up appearances on the following: the live DVDs Live Intrusion, War at the Warfield, Still Reigning, Soundtrack to the Apocalypse's deluxe edition's bonus live disc, and the live double album Decade of Aggression. Adrien Begrand of PopMatters described "South of Heaven" as "an unorthodox set opener in theory", noting "the song went over like a megaton bomb detonating the place: dozens of inverted crosses projected behind the high drum riser, the sinewy opening notes kicked in, followed by an overture of bass, cymbal crashes, and tom fills, leading up to the slowly building crescendo" in a concert review. Lombardo remembers listening to a live rendition of "South of Heaven" and thinking, "'Man! There's just so much groove in that song.' To my kids I was saying, 'Listen to that! Listen to how groovy that is!' And it's heavy." A live version of the track featured on the JÄGERMUSIC Rarities 2004 promotional CD, given away to attendees at the Spring 2004 Jägermeister Music Tour. A live rendition of "South of Heaven" was also included on a bonus DVD which came with the group's 2007 re-release of ninth studio album Christ Illusion, shot in Vancouver, British Columbia during 2006's Unholy Alliance tour.

"Behind the Crooked Cross" was rarely played live as Hanneman hated the track, though King had always wanted to play it "because it's got a cool intro" despite it not being his favorite song. King said "that's fine" when speaking of the situation, noting "there are songs that he wants to play that I always shoot down". "Ghosts of War" is not King's favorite song either, which he attests "everybody always wants to hear" performed live. He confessed; "I like the ending, you know, I like the big heavy part and I always say, 'Let's put the heavy ending at the end of "Chemical Warfare" and just do the last half.' But I could never make that fly."

Slayer has toyed with the idea of creating a live set mixed with selections from the album and 1990's Seasons in the Abyss, though Hanneman said it's something which hasn't been "seriously considered". Metal Maniacs asked Slayer in a 2006 interview whether they would consider playing South of Heaven in the footsteps of the Still Reigning tour, to which Araya replied, "It's becoming a trendy thing now. I don't know. We have some really cool albums, but I don't think we'll ever do that again." King was equally unsure, commenting, "Probably not. And I just don't like enough songs off South of Heaven."

== Track listing ==
Side one
No.	Title	Writer(s)	Length
1.	"South of Heaven"	Tom Araya (lyrics); Jeff Hanneman (music)	4:58
2.	"Silent Scream"	Araya (lyrics); Hanneman (music); Kerry King (music)	3:07
3.	"Live Undead"	Araya (lyrics); King (lyrics); Hanneman (music)	3:50
4.	"Behind the Crooked Cross"	Hanneman	3:15
5.	"Mandatory Suicide"	Araya (lyrics); Hanneman (music); King (music)	4:05

Side two
No.	Title	Writer(s)	Length
6.	"Ghosts of War"	King (lyrics & music); Hanneman (music)	3:53
7.	"Read Between the Lies"	Araya (lyrics); King (lyrics); Hanneman (music)	3:20
8.	"Cleanse the Soul"	Araya (lyrics); King (lyrics); Hanneman (music)	3:02
9.	"Dissident Aggressor" (Judas Priest cover)	Glenn Tipton; Rob Halford; K. K. Downing	2:35
10.	"Spill the Blood"	Hanneman	4:48
Total length:			36:54

== Personnel ==
Personnel taken from South of Heaven liner notes.

Slayer

- Tom Araya – vocals, bass
- Jeff Hanneman – guitars
- Kerry King – guitars
- Dave Lombardo – drums

Leads

- South of Heaven – 1st: King, 2nd: Hanneman
- Silent Scream – King/Hanneman
- Live Undead – 1st: Hanneman, 2nd: King, 3rd: King, 4th: Hanneman, 5th: King, 6th: King, 7th: Hanneman
- Behind the Crooked Cross – Hanneman/King/King/Hanneman
- Mandatory Suicide – 1st: Hanneman, 2nd: Hanneman
- Ghosts of War – Hanneman/King/Hanneman
- Read Between the Lies – Hanneman
- Cleanse the Soul – 1st: King, 2nd: Hanneman, 3rd: King
- Spill the Blood – 1st: Hanneman, 2nd: King

Production

- Rick Rubin – production
- Slayer – production
- Andy Wallace – mixing, recording
- Bill Freesh – recording
- Peter Kelsey – recording
- Steve Ett – recording
- Howie Weinberg – mastering

Artwork

- Larry Carroll – illustration
- Howard Schwartzberg – illustration
- Douglas Day – design

== Charts ==
Chart (1988)	Peak position
Australian Albums (ARIA)	53
Canada Top Albums/CDs (RPM)	89
Dutch Albums (Album Top 100)	31
Finnish Albums (The Official Finnish Charts)	11
German Albums (Offizielle Top 100)	23
Swedish Albums (Sverigetopplistan)	50
UK Albums (Official Charts)	25
US Billboard 200	57

Chart (2006)	Peak position
Irish Albums (IRMA)	91

Chart (2016)	Peak position
Belgian Albums (Ultratop Flanders)	198

Chart (2025)	Peak position
Hungarian Physical Albums (MAHASZ)	31

== Certifications ==
Region	Certification	Certified units/sales
Canada (Music Canada)	Gold	50,000^{^}
United Kingdom (BPI)	Silver	60,000^{^}
United States (RIAA)	Gold	500,000^{^}
^{^} Shipments figures based on certification alone.

== Bibliography ==
- Weisbard, Eric; Marks, Craig (1995). Spin Alternative Record Guide. Vintage Books. ISBN 0-679-75574-8.
