= War at the Warfield =

Video by Slayer
- Released: July 29, 2003
- Recorded: December 7, 2001
- Venue: The Warfield (San Francisco, CA)
- Genre: Thrash metal
- Length: 86:11
- Label: American
- Director: Anthony M. Bongiovi

Slayer chronology
Live Intrusion (1995)	War at the Warfield (2003)	Still Reigning (2004)

War at the Warfield is a concert video by Slayer which was released on July 29, 2003, through American Recordings. Recorded at Warfield Theatre in San Francisco, California, on December 7, 2001, it is the band's second video album. The DVD's contents were announced by MTV on July 25, 2003. It is the last release by Slayer with drummer Paul Bostaph (before he came back in 2013), who left due to a chronic elbow injury. Bostaph was subsequently replaced by original Slayer drummer Dave Lombardo. War at the Warfield was well received by critics, debuting at number three on the Billboard DVD chart, and sold over 7,000 copies in its first week. It was certified gold by the Recording Industry Association of America (RIAA) for selling over 50,000 copies in the United States. It also won a 2003 Metal Edge Readers' Choice Award for DVD of the Year.

== Recording and release ==
The video was recorded at the Warfield Theatre in San Francisco on December 7, 2001. War at the Warfield was Slayer's second DVD. Originally set for release on February 11, 2003, and later February 13, 2003, it was delayed several times, due to unspecified "production issues". However, on May 20, 2003, it was announced that the release would be on June 17, 2003, only to be pushed back once again to July 27. Before the DVD's release, Tom Araya commented, "I don't think it's different than any other Slayer show, you got your kids doing the mosh stuff. They get crazy, they tear the place up. And then you get the one kid that's tempted to jump off the balcony. Whether he does it or not is another story. When they do, of course they get hurt, but they always insist on staying so they can watch the rest of the show, then they go to the emergency room." On July 25, 2003, four days before its release, MTV announced the DVD's contents.

== Bostaph's departure ==
Bostaph gave the band prior knowledge of his willingness to leave before recording the DVD. "You gotta understand that the taping of that; the Warfield show was two shows before my last show with the band. I haven't watched it because you kinda go back with your scene... for the fans, they see a show; for me, I see my second to last show with the band, you know what I mean? I have it but I needed to get some distance away from the situation and move on with my life. It's like breaking up with a girlfriend."

Bostaph eventually left the band before Christmas due to a chronic elbow injury, saying it would hinder his ability to play. After his departure, Bostaph joined the band Systematic. On December 21, 2001, it was announced that original drummer, Dave Lombardo, would "temporarily reclaim his place behind the drums on the next leg" of Slayer's God Hates Us All tour. Bostaph described his time with the band as "an unbelievable ride with Slayer, playing with these guys has been an incredible high point in my career", and that he is "really grateful for the experience".

== Reception ==
Released through Universal Music & Video Distribution, the DVD entered the Billboard DVD chart at number three, selling over 7,000 copies in its first week. On June 2, 2004, the DVD was certified gold by the RIAA for more than 50,000 shipments in the United States. William Ruhlmann of Allmusic commented that the DVD "serves as both a fan's statement on Slayer and a good representation of the group's music and performance style." Jon Wiederhorn, an editor for MTV, said that "Slayer's new War at the Warfield DVD isn't one of those home-video concert releases meant to distract fans during a lengthy gap between records—the group already has ten songs written for its next LP, which should be out by April."

Andy Patrizio of IGN awarded the DVD seven out of ten, mentioning "the ferocity and intensity is still there, just a tad slower," and summarising with the statement, "if you're a Slayer fan, or into thrash in general, you'll love this. If you're not, this video isn't going to change your opinion on the music." Patrizio criticized the video's direction, observing that "the camerawork is full of fast, MTV-style cuts, which, combined with the flashing lights, is more headache-inducing than the music."

== Track listing ==
1. "Disciple" (Jeff Hanneman, Kerry King)
2. "War Ensemble" (Tom Araya, Hanneman)
3. "Stain of Mind" (Hanneman, King)
4. "New Faith" (King)
5. "Postmortem" (Hanneman)
6. "Raining Blood" (Hanneman, King)
7. "Hell Awaits" (Hanneman, King)
8. "Here Comes the Pain" (King)
9. "Die by the Sword" (Hanneman)
10. "Dittohead" (King)
11. "Bloodline" (Araya, Hanneman, King)
12. "God Send Death" (Araya, Hanneman)
13. "Dead Skin Mask" (Araya, Hanneman)
14. "Seasons in the Abyss" (Araya, Hanneman)
15. "Captor of Sin" (Hanneman, King)
16. "Mandatory Suicide" (Araya, Hanneman, King)
17. "Chemical Warfare" (Hanneman, King)
18. "South of Heaven" (Araya, Hanneman)
19. "Angel of Death" (Hanneman)

== Personnel ==
This list of credits can be verified by Allmusic and War at the Warfield's album-notes.

- Tom Araya – bass guitar, vocals
- Jeff Hanneman – guitars
- Kerry King – guitars
- Paul Bostaph – drums
- Vincenzo Amato – production assistant
- David Anthony – producer, design
- Eric Baecht – remote technician
- Greg Bess – sound consultant
- Anthony Bongiovi – director, editing, camera operator
- Eric Braverman – voices, producer
- Marcus Buick – control engineer
- David Caprio – production assistant
- Rod Carmona – producer, design
- Scott Carroll – tape operator
- Jerry Cell – engineering supervisor
- David Chun – camera operator
- Jean Luc Cohen – producer, design
- Robert Cohen – editing, camera operator
- Leonard Contreras – engineer
- John Crane – technician
- Matthew Dillon – producer, design
- Christopher Downing – producer, design
- Jeff Fura – production coordination
- CJ Furtado – engineer
- Ken "TJ" Gordon – guitar technician, bass guitar technician
- Glenis S. Gross – executive producer
- Chuck Haifley – crew
- Sam Harden – lighting
- Matt Harmon – camera operator
- Matt "Fluffy" Hartman – guitar technician
- Jim Henderson – reprocessing
- Kieran Hughes – camera operator
- Tom Hutten – producer, design
- Matt Hyde – mixing
- Jessica Jenkins – producer
- Nick John – executive producer
- Ted Kujawski – engineer
- Craig Lacombe – producer, design
- Chris "Lumpy" Lagerborg – drum technician
- Ann Lakato – camera operator
- Christian Lamb – camera operator
- Tony Leone – producer, design
- Alex Lokey – photography
- Gabe Lopez – camera operator
- James C. Moore – producer, design
- Christine Ogu – remote technician
- Dino Paredes – executive producer
- Lionel Passamonte – liner note producer
- Sue Pemberton – producer, design
- Rick Sales – executive producer
- Greg Santos – camera operator
- Thomas Scott – production assistant
- Bob Skye – engineer
- Bruce Smith – video engineer
- David Stelzer – executive producer
- Matthew Thayer – camera operator
- Frank Vu – production assistant
- Joe Weir – technician
- Mark Weiss – photography

== Certifications ==
Region	Certification	Certified units/sales
United States (RIAA)	Gold	50,000^{^}
^{^} Shipments figures based on certification alone.
