= Human Disease =

Human Disease may refer to:

- Disease
- "Human Disease", a song by Slayer from Soundtrack to the Apocalypse
- "Human Disease", a song by Betty X from Dystopia
