= Divine Intervention (Slayer album) =

Studio album by Slayer
- Released: September 27, 1994
- Recorded: March–June 1994
- Studios: Ocean Way (Los Angeles); Sound City (Van Nuys)
- Genre: Thrash metal
- Length: 36:33
- Label: American
- Producer: Slayer

Slayer chronology
Decade of Aggression (1991)	Divine Intervention (1994)	Undisputed Attitude (1996)

Serenity in Murder EP
- Cover of the Serenity in Murder EP, released on August 28, 1995

Divine Intervention is the sixth studio album by American thrash metal band Slayer, released on September 27, 1994, by American Recordings. The album's production posed a challenge to the label, as its marketing situation drew arguments over its explicitness; to give them time to decide over its style, the band released the live album Decade of Aggression. Since it was released nearly four years after its predecessor Seasons in the Abyss (1990), vocalist Tom Araya said there was more time spent on its production compared to the band's previous albums.

Divine Intervention was the band's first album to feature Paul Bostaph, replacing original drummer Dave Lombardo, who left the band in 1992. Its songs' origins came not only from television shows, but were also inspired by various other subjects including Rush Limbaugh, Holocaust architect Reinhard Heydrich, and serial killer Jeffrey Dahmer. Its cover artwork was painted and designed by Wes Benscoter as a re-imaging of the band's early "Slayergram" graphic. Although so much time was spent on its production, Kerry King has expressed his disapproval over the album's final mix, saying it should have had more attention.

Despite receiving mixed reviews from critics, Divine Intervention peaked at number eight on the US Billboard 200 and number 15 on the UK Albums Chart, selling over 93,000 copies in its first week of sales. It was later certified gold in the United States and Canada, and was followed by the EP Serenity in Murder.

== Writing and production ==
Tom Araya said that "when we did Divine Intervention, this was the last conference we ever had with a record label where they sat us down and sold us the idea of how they wanted to do "Divine", and how they were going to do this with the cover... and all these different ideas for the album. Then one guy looked at us and said, 'But we need a hit song.' And we said, 'But you've got eleven songs, and if you can't find a hit in one of them then you're shit out of luck because that's what we're giving you.' So we're like saying to them, 'Right, you write the fucking hit song and we'll record it.' That shut the guy up and that was the last time we had any kind of meetings like that!"

Araya described "For this one, I just kind of got inspired by watching TV. That gave me a whole lot of ideas. The whole idea about the dude with Slayer in his arms was brought about because reality is scarier than anything you can make up." The production of the album posed as a challenge to the record company, "how to market a group whose gore-soaked, extreme music is anathema to radio programmers." It is the company's first attempt to "hit the thrash band's core-audience of rabid enthusiasts with a fan-orientated marketing assault." Araya related: "We decided to take more time to bring this one together. We actually went into the studio with more written material than the past. We completed three out of seven songs outside the studio. We all sort of felt it was important to do it slowly. After the last tour, we had the intention to take the break."

== Lyrics ==
The College Music Journal said that "the band deals almost exclusively with realism" in the album, noting that it "shocks and splatters like a severed artery, painting crimson pictures of murders, necrophiliacs, and the ravaged, chaotic world they inhabit". Neil Strauss from The New York Times explained many of the album's origins. "213" was described as a "love song" by Araya, which was something they had never done before. The song was named after serial killer and sex offender Jeffrey Dahmer's old apartment number. "Dittohead" begins by criticizing the legal system for "being too lenient on killers". Strauss said the song "ended up not denouncing the system but advocating its permissiveness". "Sex, Murder, Art" was said by TheState.com to feature "roars about a maddening relationship and his 'pleasure in inflicting pain.'" "SS-3" is about Nazi official Reinhard Heydrich. King said that the album contained origins relating to "explorations of madness". The lyrics led to the album being banned in Germany in 1998.

== Artwork and packaging ==
The album was issued in a clear jewel box with a die-cut cardboard O-card. It included sixteen pages, which fold out to be a poster, which displays the cover art. Both the disc and the disc tray feature — as described by Chris Morris — an "image reflective of the mania displayed by the group's fans, and exemplary of American frequently deployed shock tactics: a kid carving the band's name into his arms with a scalpel." Mike Bone from American Recordings said that "we captured this not only by photography, but with video — him actually doing it." The front cover was painted and designed by Wes Benscoter, an American artist who would later paint the covers for the other Slayer releases Undisputed Attitude and Live Intrusion. The album sleeve features for the second time the backronym Satan Laughs As You Eternally Rot. This phrase was first used on the vinyl edition of the album Show No Mercy where it was carved into the runout groove of the record.

== Reception ==
Professional ratings
Review scores
Source	Rating
AllMusic	3/5 stars
Collector's Guide to Heavy Metal	8/10
Entertainment Weekly	B
Kerrang!	5/5 stars
Metal Forces	7/10
Rolling Stone	4/5 stars
Rock Hard	8.5/10
Spin Alternative Record Guide	6/10

Alex Henderson of AllMusic said that "instead of doing something calculated like emulating Nirvana or Pearl Jam—or for that matter, Nine Inch Nails or Ministry—Slayer wisely refused to sound like anyone but Slayer. Tom Araya and co. responded to the new environment simply by striving to be the heaviest metal band they possibly could." They also praised Bostaph's performance, saying that he was a "positive, energizing influence on Slayer, which sounds better than ever on such dark triumphs as 'Killing Fields,' 'Serenity in Murder,' and 'Circle of Beliefs.'" Henderson also said that they "focus[ed] on the violently repressive nature of governments and the lengths to which they will go to wield power". By the album's release date, vocalist Tom Araya considered it to be their best album.

Both the mixing and mastering were criticized, with guitarist Kerry King saying that the band should have "[paid] more attention to the mix", and Araya saying that it "is the one (if any) that he would not mind re-mastering".

Divine Intervention sold 93,000 copies in its first week, and by 2009, it sold over 496,000 copies in the US . It was reported that in the same year of its release, Kevin Kirk from the Heavy Metal Shop "ordered 1,000 copies of Slayer's Divine Intervention and sold every last album in a matter of weeks". Although it is less accessible than its predecessor Seasons in the Abyss, Rolling Stone considered it to be their most successful album as of 2001.

== Track listing ==
No.	Title	Lyrics	Music	Length
1.	"Killing Fields"	Tom Araya	Kerry King	3:57
2.	"Sex. Murder. Art."	Araya	King	1:50
3.	"Fictional Reality"	King	King	3:38
4.	"Dittohead"	King	King	2:31
5.	"Divine Intervention"	Araya; Paul Bostaph; Jeff Hanneman; King	Hanneman; King	5:33
6.	"Circle of Beliefs"	King	King	4:30
7.	"SS-3"	Hanneman	Hanneman; King	4:07
8.	"Serenity in Murder"	Araya	Hanneman; King	2:36
9.	"213"	Araya	Hanneman	4:52
10.	"Mind Control"	Araya; King	Hanneman; King	3:04
Total length:				36:33

=== Serenity in Murder EP ===
Studio track
No.	Title	Length
1.	"Serenity in Murder"	2:37

Live tracks
No.	Title	Length
2.	"Angel of Death"	4:52
3.	"Mandatory Suicide"	4:05
4.	"War Ensemble"	4:52
Total length:		16:26

== Personnel ==
Personnel adapted from Divine Intervention liner notes.

Slayer

- Tom Araya – vocals, bass
- Jeff Hanneman – guitars
- Kerry King – guitars
- Paul Bostaph – drums

Leads

- Killing Fields – King
- Fictional Reality – 1st: King, 2nd: Hanneman, 3rd: King
- Dittohead – 1st: Hanneman, 2nd: King
- Divine Intervention – 1st: King, 2nd: King, 3rd: Hanneman, 4th: Hanneman
- Circle of Beliefs – 1st: King, 2nd: Hanneman, 3rd: King, 4th: Hanneman
- SS-3 – 1st: Hanneman, 2nd: King
- Serenity in Murder – 1st: Hanneman, 2nd: King
- 213 – Hanneman
- Mind Control – 1st: Hanneman, 2nd: King

Production

- Slayer – production
- Rick Rubin – executive production
- Toby Wright – co-production, engineering, mixing
- Jim Scott – additional engineering
- Jim Champagne – additional engineering
- "Super" Dave Brock – assistant engineering (Ocean Way)
- Brian Pollack – assistant engineering (Record Plant)
- Jeff Sheehan – assistant engineering (Sound City)
- Stephen Marcussen – mastering

Design

- Wes Benscoter – front cover illustration
- Annalisa – portraits
- Neil Zlozower – band photos
- Stephen Stickler – arm photo
- Dick Walter – art direction, design

== Charts ==
Chart (1994)	Peak position
Australian Albums (ARIA)	27
Austrian Albums (Ö3 Austria)	22
Canada Top Albums/CDs (RPM)	27
Dutch Albums (Album Top 100)	31
Finnish Albums (The Official Finnish Charts)	4
French Albums (SNEP)	19
German Albums (Offizielle Top 100)	18
Japanese Albums (Oricon)	23
New Zealand Albums (RMNZ)	20
Scottish Albums (Official Charts)	28
Swedish Albums (Sverigetopplistan)	10
Swiss Albums (Schweizer Hitparade)	15
UK Albums (Official Charts)	15
UK Rock & Metal Albums (Official Charts)	1
US Billboard 200	8

== Certifications ==
Region	Certification	Certified units/sales
Canada (Music Canada)	Gold	50,000^{^}
United States (RIAA)	Gold	500,000^{^}
^{^} Shipments figures based on certification alone.
