= Reign in Blood =

Studio album by Slayer
- Released: October 20, 1986
- Recorded: January–March 1986
- Studio: Hit City West (Los Angeles)
- Genre: Thrash metal
- Length: 28:55
- Labels: Def Jam; Geffen
- Producers: Slayer; Rick Rubin

Slayer chronology
Hell Awaits (1985)	Reign in Blood (1986)	South of Heaven (1988)

Singles from Reign in Blood
- 1. "Postmortem" Released: 1986; 2. "Criminally Insane (Remix)" Released: 1987

Reign in Blood is the third studio album by American thrash metal band Slayer, released on October 20, 1986, by Def Jam Recordings. It was the first Slayer album to be released by Def Jam and the first to be produced by Rick Rubin, whose input helped the band's sound evolve.

Reign in Blood received widespread acclaim upon release and was responsible for bringing Slayer to the attention of a mainstream metal audience. Alongside Anthrax's Among the Living, Megadeth's Peace Sells... but Who's Buying?, and Metallica's Master of Puppets, Reign in Blood is credited with defining the sound of the emerging American thrash metal scene in the mid-1980s. It was the first Slayer album to enter the US Billboard 200, peaking at number 94, and was certified Gold by the Recording Industry Association of America (RIAA) in 1992.

The release of the album was delayed due to concerns regarding the lyrical subject matter of the opening track "Angel of Death", which refers to Josef Mengele and describes acts such as human experimentation that he committed at the Auschwitz concentration camp. The band defended the song, stating that they did not condone Nazism and were merely interested in exploring the subject.

Often considered to be one of the greatest and most influential metal albums of all time, NME ranked Reign in Blood at number 287 in its list of the 500 Greatest Albums of All Time in 2013. In their 2017 listing of the 100 Greatest Metal albums of all time, Rolling Stone magazine ranked the album at number 6.

== Background ==
Slayer composed the material for Reign in Blood following their return from a tour of Europe. Guitarists Kerry King and Jeff Hanneman wrote much of the album's music on their own, and quickly taught it to drummer Dave Lombardo. The band recorded instrumental demos of the songs (which King described as "just the best 10 songs we had at that point") and took them to Brian Slagel, the band's manager at the time.

Following the positive reception Slayer's previous release Hell Awaits had received, the band's producer and manager Brian Slagel realized the band were in a position to hit the "big time" with their next album. Slagel negotiated with several record labels, among them Rick Rubin and Russell Simmons' Def Jam Recordings. However, Slagel was reluctant to have the band signed to what was at the time primarily a hip-hop label. Slayer drummer Dave Lombardo was made aware of Rubin's interest, and he initiated contact with the producer. However, Slayer's remaining members were apprehensive of leaving Metal Blade Records, with whom they were already under contract.

Lombardo contacted Columbia Records, which was Def Jam's distributor, and managed to get in touch with Rubin, who along with photographer Glen E. Friedman agreed to attend one of the band's concerts. Friedman had produced Suicidal Tendencies's self-titled debut album, in which Slayer vocalist Tom Araya made a guest appearance in the music video for the album's single "Institutionalized", pushing Suicidal Tendencies's vocalist Mike Muir. Around this time, Rubin asked Friedman if he knew Slayer.

Guitarist Jeff Hanneman was surprised by Rubin's interest in the band, and was impressed by his work with the hip-hop acts Run-DMC and LL Cool J. During a visit by Slagel to a European music convention, Rubin spoke with the band directly, and persuaded them to sign with Def Jam. Slagel paid a personal tribute to Rubin, and said that Rubin was the most passionate of all the label representatives the band were in negotiations with. Following the agreement, Friedman brought the band members to Seattle for two days of publicity shots, possible record shots, and photos for a tour book; Rubin felt no good photos of the band had been taken before that point. One of the photos was used on the back cover of the band's 1988 release South of Heaven.

=== Cover art ===
The cover artwork was designed by Larry Carroll, who at the time was creating political illustrations for The Progressive, Village Voice, and The New York Times. Carroll was hired at Rubin's behest. Despite its warm reception, the band members themselves originally did not like the image. King said, "Nobody in the band wanted that cover. We were stuck with it." He even described the artist as a "warped demented freak," although Carroll went on to make cover arts for their next two albums, South of Heaven (1988) and Seasons in the Abyss (1990). Carroll also illustrated the cover art for Christ Illusion (2006). By a differing account, Araya recalled that he "thought it was amazing" and "liked it immediately". He also stated that there were three different variations of the album cover in its conceptual stages, with the final version incorporating elements of all three.

It was believed that Columbia Records initially refused to release Reign in Blood because of the disturbing imagery. Araya refuted this claim in 2016 saying that it was because of the song "Angel of Death" and it had nothing to do with the cover art.

=== Recording and production ===
Reign in Blood was recorded and produced at Hit City West in Los Angeles with Rubin producing and Andy Wallace engineering. The album was the label boss' first professional experience with heavy metal, and his fresh perspective led to a drastic makeover of Slayer's sound. Steve Huey of AllMusic believed Rubin drew tighter and faster songs from the band and delivered a cleanly produced sound that contrasted sharply with their previous recordings. This resulted in drastic changes to Slayer's sound, and changed audiences' perception of the band. Araya has since stated their two previous releases were not up to par production-wise. Guitarist Kerry King later remarked that "[i]t was like, 'Wow—you can hear everything, and those guys aren't just playing fast; those notes are on time.'"

According to Araya, it was Hanneman's idea to add the scream for the introduction in "Angel of Death." Araya did several takes but ended up using the first one. By a differing account, Araya stated the scream was done in two takes, with the second take going on to appear on the album.

The album's production is noted by the band for Rubin's omission of reverberation, which King said made the album sound "way more threatening". He compared the band's use of reverb on previous releases to the likes of Venom and Mercyful Fate, saying "we played in Reverb Land, for a lack of a better term." Upon hearing the album's mix, King said the band "[was] like, 'why didn't we think of that before?'" Rubin himself said, "when I hear very fast music like Metallica, and the sounds are big sounds… the whole thing gets blurry, and you can't really hear it [...] If the music you're playing is fast and if the sounds are big, there's not enough space for those big sounds to happen next to each other. There's no punctuation; it becomes a blur [...] I didn't want it to be a blur of bass; I wanted it to be a pulse." Rubin's lack of experience as a heavy metal producer at the time allowed him to work outside the general tropes of the genre. He said, "I didn't have the baggage of what the old way of doing it was [...] And in this case, these forms of music were so new that the old way would've lessened their impact. It wouldn't have made them better." He limited his use of studio effects to what he felt was absolutely necessary. Rubin's approach to the album's production resulted in a "stripped-back, punchy" sound.

Hanneman later admitted that while the band was listening to Metallica and Megadeth at the time, they were finding the repetition of guitar riffs tiring. He said, "If we do a verse two or three times, we're already bored with it. So we weren't trying to make the songs shorter—that's just what we were into," which resulted in the album's short duration of 29 minutes. The band realized the album's runtime only when they were finishing up with its mixing with engineer Andy Wallace. The band weren't sure whether they would have to hit the studio to create more material or just leave it, so they turned to Rubin. "His only reply was that it had 10 songs, verses, choruses and leads and that's what constituted an album. He didn't have any issue with it," Araya told Metal Hammer.

King had stated that while hour-long records seem to be the trend, "[y]ou could lose this part; you could cut this song completely, and make a much more intense record, which is what we're all about." When the record was completed, the band met with Rubin, who asked: "Do you realize how short this is?" Slayer members looked at each other, and replied: "So what?" The entire album was on one side of a cassette; King stated it was "neat", as "You could listen to it, flip it over, and play it again." The music is abrasive and faster than previous releases, helping to narrow the gap between thrash metal and its predecessor hardcore punk, and is played at an average of 220 beats per minute.

Slayer decided to abandon some of the earlier Satanic themes explored on their previous album Hell Awaits, with Araya describing their new themes as "more on a social level".

=== Lombardo's departure ===
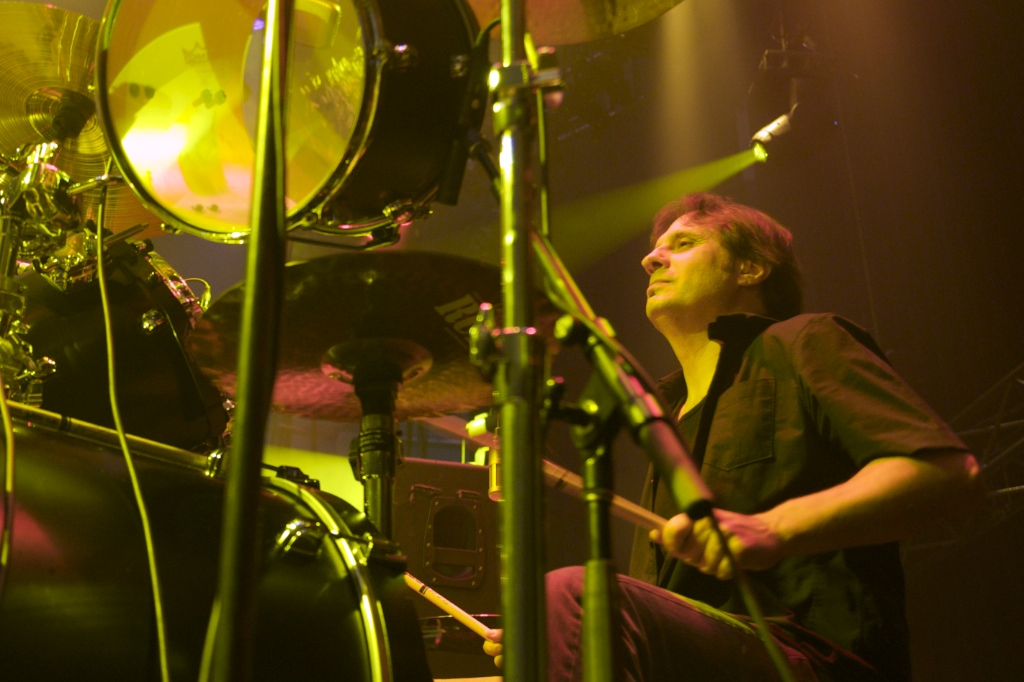
Lombardo (pictured) on departing Slayer: "I wasn't making any money. I think I had just gotten married, and I figured if we were gonna be doing this professionally—on a major label—I wanted my rent and utilities paid."

Following the album's recording sessions, Slayer embarked on the Reign in Pain tour with the bands Overkill in the United States and Malice in Europe; they also served as the opening act for W.A.S.P.'s U.S. tour in 1987. In late 1986, drummer Lombardo quit the band. To continue the tour Slayer enlisted Whiplash drummer Tony Scaglione.

Rubin called Lombardo daily to insist he return, telling him: "Dude, you gotta come back in the band." Rubin offered Lombardo a salary, but he was still hesitant about returning; at this point Lombardo had been out of the band for several months. Lombardo returned in 1987; Rubin came to his house and picked him up in his Porsche, taking him to a Slayer rehearsal.

== Composition and music ==
Reign In Blood is a thrash metal album that contains many tempo changes and breakdowns. Eschewing traditional pop and rock song structures, the album's tracks are instead upon transitions between different guitar riffs. Joseph Schafer of Invisible Oranges characterized the general format of the albums tracks as "shocking open, memorable end, and a whole lot of velocity in-between." He further explained, "Reign In Blood is a singular record with a singular purpose: adrenaline. They embodied it, they produced it. These songs increase heart rates. In effect the music sounds simple-to-understand and direct to the point of mathematical elegance."

== Critical reception ==
Professional ratings
Review scores
Source	Rating
AllMusic	5/5 stars
The Guardian	5/5 stars
Kerrang!	5/5 stars
Rock Hard	9.5/10
The Rolling Stone Album Guide	4.5/5 stars
Spin Alternative Record Guide	10/10
Stylus Magazine	A+
The Village Voice	B+

Although the album received no radio airplay, it was the band's first release to enter the Billboard 200, where it debuted at number 127, and attained its peak position at number 94 in its sixth week. The album also reached number 47 on the UK Album Chart, and on November 20, 1992, it was certified gold in the US.

Reign in Blood was critically acclaimed by the underground and mainstream music press. Reviewing for AllMusic, Steve Huey awarded the album five out of five, describing it a "stone-cold classic." Stylus Magazine critic Clay Jarvis awarded the album an A+ grade, calling it a "genre-definer," as well as "the greatest metal album of all time." Jarvis further remarked the song "Angel of Death" "smokes the asses of any band playing fast and/or heavy today. Lyrically outlining the horrors to come, while musically laying the groundwork for the rest of the record: fast, lean and filthy." Kerrang! magazine described it as the "heaviest album of all time," and listed the album at number 27 among the "100 Greatest Heavy Metal Albums of All Time". Metal Hammer magazine named it "the best metal album of the last 20 years" in 2006. Q Magazine ranked Reign in Blood among their list of the "50 Heaviest Albums of All Time", and Spin Magazine ranked the album at number 67 on their list of the "100 Greatest Albums, 1985–2005". Critic Chad Bowar stated: "1986's Reign in Blood is probably the best thrash album ever recorded." In August 2014, Revolver placed the album on its "14 Thrash Albums You Need to Own" list. In 2017, it was ranked 6th on Rolling Stone's list of "100 Greatest Metal Albums of All Time".

Adrien Begrand of PopMatters observed that "[t]here's no better song to kick things off than the masterful 'Angel of Death', one of the most monumental songs in metal history, where guitarists Kerry King and Jeff Hanneman deliver their intricate riffs, drummer Dave Lombardo performs some of the most powerful drumming ever recorded, and bassist/vocalist Tom Araya screams and snarls his tale of Nazi war criminal Josef Mengele." When asked why Reign in Blood has retained its popularity, King replied: "If you released Reign in Blood today, no one would give a shit. It was timing; it was a change in sound. In thrash metal at that time, no one had ever heard good production on a record like that. It was just a bunch of things that came together at once." Decibel inducted Reign in Blood into the Decibel Magazine Hall of Fame in November 2004, being the first album to earn such award.

Not all retrospective assessments have been positive. Joseph Schafer of Invisible Oranges claimed what he saw as "worship" of the album within the heavy metal community to be "misguided". He wrote, "In true antichristian fashion, Reign in Blood is a golden calf that deserves to be slaughtered, or at least bled out a little. [...] The various decisions that Slayer made [...] Tom Araya’s consonant-riddled vocal bark, abbreviated song lengths, Kerry King and Jeff Hanneman’s tremolo-bar destroying dive-bomb guitar solos, every bugfuck nuts fill Dave Lombardo performs. Every single one of those individual ideas is more interesting than the songs they are in. Reign in Blood is, in every sense, much less than the sum of its more-interesting parts."

== Legacy ==
Reign in Blood is regarded by critics as one of the most influential and extreme thrash metal albums. In its "Greatest Metal Bands of All Time" poll, MTV praised Slayer's "downtuned rhythms, infectious guitar licks, graphically violent lyrics and grisly artwork," which they stated "set the standard for dozens of emerging thrash bands," while "Slayer's music was directly responsible for the rise of death metal." MTV described Reign in Blood as essential listening, and the album was ranked number 7 on IGN's "Top 25 Most Influential Metal Albums".

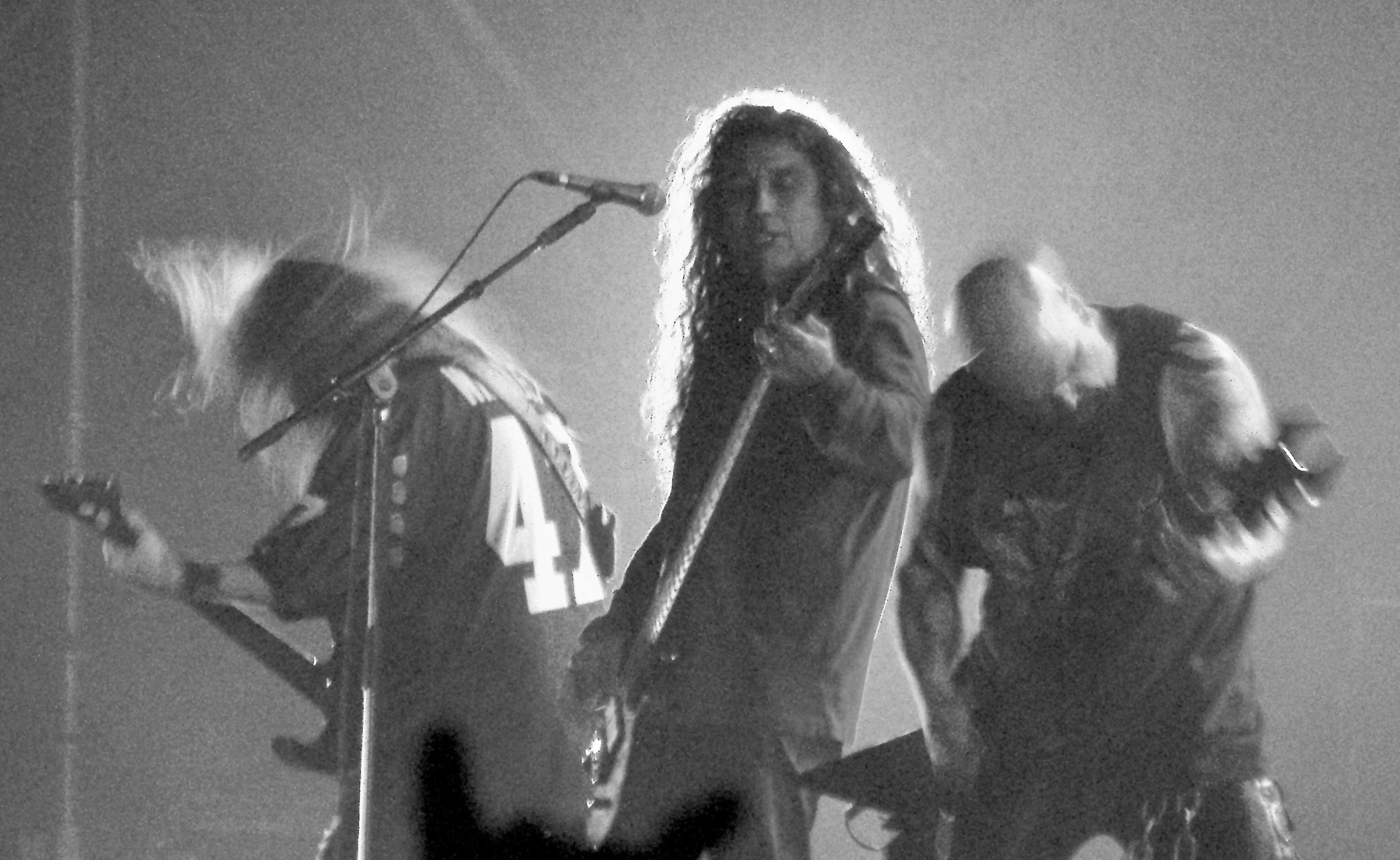
"Raining Blood" and "Angel of Death" have been played at almost every show.

Asked during a press tour for 1994's Divine Intervention about the pressure of living up to Reign in Blood, King replied that the band did not try to better it, but just wanted to make music. In 2006, Blabbermouth's Don Kaye drew a comparison to the band's 2006 album Christ Illusion, and concluded, "Slayer may never make an album as incendiary as Reign in Blood again."

Rapper Necro was heavily influenced by the album, and has remarked that it takes him back to the 1980s, "when shit was pure". Ektomorf vocalist Zoltán Farkas describes the album as one of his primary influences. Paul Mazurkiewicz of Cannibal Corpse stated Lombardo's performance on the album helped him play faster throughout his career. Kelly Shaefer of Atheist said: "When Reign in Blood came out it changed everything! That is easily the best extreme metal record ever!"

Hanneman said that the album was his personal favorite, reasoning it was "so short and quick and to the point".

Paul Bostaph – Slayer's drummer from 1992 to 2001, and from 2013 to 2019 – first heard the record while a member of Forbidden. At a party, he walked towards music he heard from another room and approached Forbidden guitarist Craig Locicero. Asked what was playing, Locicero shouted, "The new Slayer record." After listening closely, Bostaph looked at Locicero, and concluded his band was "fucked".

Oderus Urungus of Gwar cited "Altar of Sacrifice" as his favourite Slayer song: "It's the one I would always play for my friends when I was getting into Slayer. They would get this glazed look in their eyes and worship the speakers while doing the devil-horn thing."

In 2006, the album won a Metal Hammer award for Best Album of the Last 20 Years. That same year, the album's cover art was featured in Blender Magazine's 2006 "top ten heavy metal album covers of all time."

In 2005, Rock Hard ranked the album at number six on its list of the "500 Greatest Rock & Metal Albums of All Time." In 2016, Loudwire ranked Reign in Blood first among Slayer's eleven studio albums. In 2013, NME ranked it at number 287 in its list of the 500 Greatest Albums of All Time.

== Live performances ==
The tracks "Raining Blood" and "Angel of Death" have become almost permanent additions to Slayer's live set, and were Hanneman's favorite tracks to play live. The band played Reign in Blood in its entirety throughout the fall of 2004, under the tour banner "Still Reigning". In 2004, a live DVD of the same name was released, which included a finale with the band covered in fake blood during the performance of "Raining Blood".

King later said that while the idea of playing Reign in Blood in its entirety was suggested before by their booking agency, it was met with little support. The band ultimately decided they needed to add more excitement to their live shows, and to avoid repetition incorporated the ideas of raining blood. When asked about using fake blood in future performances, King remarked: "It's time to move on, but never say never. I know Japan never saw it, South America and Australia never saw it. So you never know." In 2008 the band performed Reign in Blood in its entirety once again, this time in Paris, France, during the third European Unholy Alliance Tour.

Although it was omitted from a number of concerts because of short time allotments, Slayer have often said that they enjoy playing the album in its entirety. According to Hanneman: "We still enjoy playing these songs live. We play these songs over and over and over, but they're good songs, intense songs! If it were melodic songs or some kind of boring 'clap your hands' song, you'd be going crazy playing those every night. But our songs are just bam-bam-bam-bam, they're intense." The band was on stage for 70 minutes, which allowed only seven or eight additional songs to be played following the album's play. King stated this arrangement "alienates too many people". In the Unholy Alliance Tour of 2004, however, the album was played in its entirety during Slayer's set as the last ten songs to end the show. The album was performed live at the I'll Be Your Mirror London festival in May 2012. In May 2014, it was announced that Slayer would perform the album in its entirety at Riot Fest in Chicago and Denver.

== Controversy ==
Hanneman was inspired to write "Angel of Death" after he read a number of books on Josef Mengele during a Slayer tour. Def Jam's distributor, Columbia Records, refused to distribute the album because of the song, particularly its lyrics describing the Holocaust. Reign in Blood was eventually distributed by Geffen Records; however, due to the controversy, it did not appear on Geffen's release schedule and the Geffen logo was not put on the album. The song led to accusations of Nazi sympathizing and racism, which have followed the band throughout their career. Hanneman has stated that people misinterpret the lyrics, and clarified: "[t]here's nothing I put in the lyrics that says necessarily he was a bad man, because to me — well, isn't that obvious[?] I shouldn't have to tell you that."

== Track listing ==
Side one
No.	Title	Lyrics	Music	Length
1.	"Angel of Death"	Jeff Hanneman	Hanneman	4:51
2.	"Piece by Piece"	Kerry King	King	2:02
3.	"Necrophobic"	Hanneman; King	Hanneman; King	1:40
4.	"Altar of Sacrifice"	King	Hanneman	2:50
5.	"Jesus Saves"	King	Hanneman; King	2:54

Side two
No.	Title	Lyrics	Music	Length
6.	"Criminally Insane"	Hanneman; King	Hanneman; King	2:23
7.	"Reborn"	King	Hanneman	2:11
8.	"Epidemic"	King	Hanneman; King	2:23
9.	"Postmortem"	Hanneman	Hanneman	3:27
10.	"Raining Blood"	Hanneman; King	Hanneman	4:14
Total length:				28:55

1998 re-issue bonus tracks
No.	Title	Lyrics	Music	Length
11.	"Aggressive Perfector"	Hanneman; King	Hanneman; King	2:30
12.	"Criminally Insane" (remix)	Hanneman; King	Hanneman; King	3:18
Total length:				34:43

== Personnel ==
Slayer

- Tom Araya – bass, vocals
- Kerry King – guitars
- Jeff Hanneman – guitars
- Dave Lombardo – drums

Production

- Rick Rubin – production
- Slayer – production
- Andy Wallace – engineering
- Howie Weinberg – mastering
- Larry Carroll – artwork

== Charts ==
Chart (1986–1987)	Peak position
UK Albums (Official Charts)	47
US Billboard 200	94

Chart (2006)	Peak position
Irish Albums (IRMA)	80
UK Rock & Metal Albums (Official Charts)	9

Chart (2009)	Peak position
Japanese Albums (Oricon)	264

Chart (2022)	Peak position
Polish Albums (ZPAV)	48

== Certifications ==
Region	Certification	Certified units/sales
United Kingdom (BPI)	Silver	60,000^{‡}
United States (RIAA)	Gold	500,000^{^}
^{^} Shipments figures based on certification alone.^{‡} Sales+streaming figures based on certification alone.
