= Seasons in the Abyss =

Studio album by Slayer
- Released: October 9, 1990
- Recorded: March–June 1990
- Studios: Hit City West, Hollywood Sound, and Record Plant, Los Angeles, California
- Genre: Thrash metal
- Length: 42:27
- Label: Def American
- Producer: Rick Rubin

Slayer chronology
South of Heaven (1988)	Seasons in the Abyss (1990)	Decade of Aggression (1991)

Singles from Seasons in the Abyss
- 1. "Seasons in the Abyss" Released: 1990; 2. "Spirit in Black" Released: 1990

Seasons in the Abyss is the fifth studio album by American thrash metal band Slayer, released on October 9, 1990, through Def American Records. Recording sessions began in March 1990 at Hit City West and Hollywood Sound, and ended in June 1990 at The Record Plant in Los Angeles, California. It was the band's last album to feature their full original lineup with drummer Dave Lombardo until his return on the band's 2006 album Christ Illusion. Seasons in the Abyss' musical style has been compared by critics to the band's previous two albums, South of Heaven (1988) and Reign in Blood (1986). At 42:27, it is the band's longest album.

Upon its release, Seasons in the Abyss received a generally positive reception and peaked at number 40 on the US Billboard 200. It was later certified gold in the United States and Canada. By 2017, it had sold over 813,000 copies in the United States since Nielsen SoundScan inception.

== Recording and production ==
The album was recorded from March to June 1990 in two separate studios: Hit City West, Hollywood Sound, and Record Plant in Los Angeles, California. Seasons in the Abyss was produced by Rick Rubin, who had also produced their previous two albums Reign in Blood and South of Heaven.

Track eight, "Temptation", featured an overdub of lead vocalist Tom Araya's singing; the vocal arrangement on the track was unintentional. Araya sang the song twice: once the way he felt it sounded best; the second time at the insistence of Kerry King the way he thought it should be sung. By accident both tracks were played back simultaneously; King liked the way it sounded together and so it was left that way for the final version.

== Music and lyrics ==
According to Nathan Brackett, author of The Rolling Stone Album Guide, Seasons in the Abyss continued the band's sound as displayed in their first four albums. The songs on the album have complex guitar riffs that proceed at both "blinding speed" tempos and mid-tempo hefts. Brackett said that the songs' themes shy away from the "fantasy and into the hells here on Earth" and instead was "music to conquer nations by".

Deathmetal.org characterizes Seasons in the Abyss as "an onslaught of sonic distortion" with "abrupt two-string chord barrage and a rippling roar of unleashed tremolo strumming." The album also contains longer, whole-interval phrases and chromatic extensions compared to previous Slayer records.

The album combines "grim" vocals and "frenetic" guitars. Blabbermouth.net said that the album is "considered to be among the genre's all-time classics". "War Ensemble", "Dead Skin Mask", and "Seasons in the Abyss" were described as setting the album's standard and the songs, according to the site, produced a sound that could not be matched by anyone else. American double murderer and graverobber Ed Gein was the inspiration for writing the song "Dead Skin Mask".

Steve Huey of AllMusic said that it combines the mid-tempo grooves of South of Heaven with "manic bursts of aggression" similar to the style of Reign in Blood. AllMusic also said that when writing the album's lyrics, Slayer "rarely turns to demonic visions of the afterlife anymore, preferring instead to find tangible horror in real life—war, murder, [and] human weakness. There's even full-fledged social criticism, which should convince any doubters that Slayer aren't trying to promote the subjects they sing about."

== Release and reception ==
Professional ratings
Review scores
Source	Rating
AllMusic	4.5/5 stars
Collector's Guide to Heavy Metal	9/10
Entertainment Weekly	B+
Rock Hard	10/10
The Rolling Stone Album Guide	3.5/5 stars
Select	5/5 stars
Spin Alternative Record Guide	7/10
Sputnikmusic	4.0/5

Slayer released Seasons in the Abyss on October 9, 1990, through Def American Records. Later that year it was released again through Warner Music Group. It was re-released in 1994 through American Recordings. Although it was "unwelcome" to music shows and rock–radio outlets, it got substantial airplay on MTV's Headbangers Ball. Seasons in the Abyss features Slayer's first music video, filmed at the Giza Plateau in Giza, Egypt.

The album received generally positive reviews by critics. In a retrospective review, AllMusic's Steve Huey said that it "brought back some of the pounding speed of Reign in Blood for their third major-label album", and addressed it to be "their most accessible album, displaying the full range of their abilities all in one place, with sharp, clean production". Huey also wrote that the album "paints Reagan-era America as a cesspool of corruption and cruelty, and the music is as devilishly effective as ever".

Deathmetal.org describes Seasons in the Abyss as a "solid" album and "the last of the Slayer albums to contain any strength of will or spirit", noting it is not as subtle nor as intense as previous Slayer records; the songwriting is thematically more unfocused and disorganized, sometimes giving way to forced aggression.

J. D. Considine noted about "War Ensemble": "it's not a pretty song by any means. An aural blitzkrieg whose chorus climaxes with the lines, 'The final swing is not a drill/It's how many people I can kill,' it is filled with brutal images and blaring guitars, all propelled at the breathless pace of thrash metal." Considine would later say that the album's music "so accurately sums up the controlled panic of combat that the Army itself has been using Slayer songs to psych its troops for military maneuvers in the Saudi desert". Mike Stagno from Sputnikmusic said that the album was a well-received return by Slayer. Entertainment Weekly reviewer David Browne said that listening to Seasons in the Abyss was "like listening to a single speed-metal song—the world's longest". In 2017, it was ranked 31st on Rolling Stone's "100 Greatest Metal Albums of All Time".

The album peaked at number 40 on the Billboard 200 and number 18 on the UK Albums Chart. Seasons in the Abyss was certified gold in both the United States and Canada. The title track and "War Ensemble" earned Slayer its heaviest airplay on MTV to date. In an October 2007 interview, Evile frontman Matt Drake described Seasons in the Abyss as "the perfect mix" between the two styles ("speed" and "slow material") showcased on Reign in Blood and South of Heaven respectively. Children of Bodom bassist Henkka T. Blacksmith hailed Seasons in the Abyss as "the best metal album ever". The crossover thrash supergroup S.O.D. released a single named "Seasoning the Obese" in tribute to the album.

In 2016, Loudwire ranked Seasons in the Abyss #2 among Slayer's eleven studio albums. At the 1991 Foundations Forum, the music video for the title track won a Concrete Foundations Award for Best Video, tying with Jane's Addiction's "Been Caught Stealing."

In 2021, Metal Injection included the album on their list of Metal Albums Arguably Better Than Their Respective Band’s Most Acclaimed, writing "Reign in Blood may be what most fans consider the defining moment in the career of this legendary outfit, but Seasons in the Abyss was the album that proved the group could seamlessly meld together their trademark high-speed fretwork with a newfound appreciation for mid-tempo grooves. The results? Arguably their most cohesive record to date."

== Track listing ==
All music is composed by Jeff Hanneman, except where noted.

Side one
No.	Title	Lyrics	Music	Length
1.	"War Ensemble"	Hanneman; Tom Araya		4:51
2.	"Blood Red"	Araya		2:47
3.	"Spirit in Black"	Kerry King		4:07
4.	"Expendable Youth"	Araya	King	4:09
5.	"Dead Skin Mask"	Araya		5:20

Side two
No.	Title	Lyrics	Music	Length
6.	"Hallowed Point"	Hanneman; Araya	Hanneman; King	3:23
7.	"Skeletons of Society"	King	King	4:40
8.	"Temptation"	King	King	3:25
9.	"Born of Fire"	King	Hanneman; King	3:07
10.	"Seasons in the Abyss"	Araya		6:34
Total length:				42:27

== Personnel ==
Slayer

- Tom Araya – bass, vocals
- Kerry King – guitars
- Jeff Hanneman – guitars
- Dave Lombardo – drums

Additional personnel

- Matt Polish – child voice on "Dead Skin Mask"

Production

- Rick Rubin – production
- Andy Wallace – co-production, engineering, mixing
- Slayer – co-production
- Larry Carroll – artwork, illustrations
- Chris Rich – assistant engineering
- David Tobocman – assistant engineering
- Allen Abrahamson – assistant engineering
- Robert Fisher – graphic design
- Howie Weinberg – mastering
- Sunny Bak – photography
- Marty Temme – photography

== Charts ==
Chart performance for Seasons in the Abyss
Chart (1990)	Peak position
Australian Albums (ARIA)	58
Austrian Albums (Ö3 Austria)	29
Dutch Albums (Album Top 100)	69
Irish Albums (The International Federation of the Phonographic Industry)	10
Finnish Albums (The Official Finnish Charts)	12
German Albums (Offizielle Top 100)	19
Swedish Albums (Sverigetopplistan)	47
UK Albums (Official Charts)	18
US Billboard 200	40

Chart (2006)	Peak position
UK Rock & Metal Albums (Official Charts)	16

Chart (2025–2026)	Peak position
Greek Albums (IFPI)	35

== Certifications ==
Region	Certification	Certified units/sales
Canada (Music Canada)	Gold	50,000^{^}
United States (RIAA)	Gold	500,000^{^}
^{^} Shipments figures based on certification alone.

== Cover versions ==
"Seasons Greetings in the Abyss"

Song by Sleigher
- Released: December 22, 2021
- Genre: Thrash metal
- Length: 6:19
- Lyricist: Charles Griffiths
- Producer: Scott Atkins

A Christmas-themed version of "Seasons in the Abyss", titled "Seasons Greetings in the Abyss", was released by Sleigher, a homophone of Slayer. The track features festive-themed lyrics, alongside traditionally non-metal instruments such as the tuba. It was performed by Charles Griffiths and Raymond Hearne of Haken, Dan Goldsworthy, who had previously done artwork for bands such as Accept, Jeramie Kling of Venom Inc., Daniel Firth of Cradle of Filth, Rody Walker of Protest the Hero, and Jordan Rudess of Dream Theater. Griffiths commented how the late Slayer guitarist Jeff Hanneman "loved Christmas, so hopefully he would approve."
