= Kerry King =

American guitarist (born 1964)

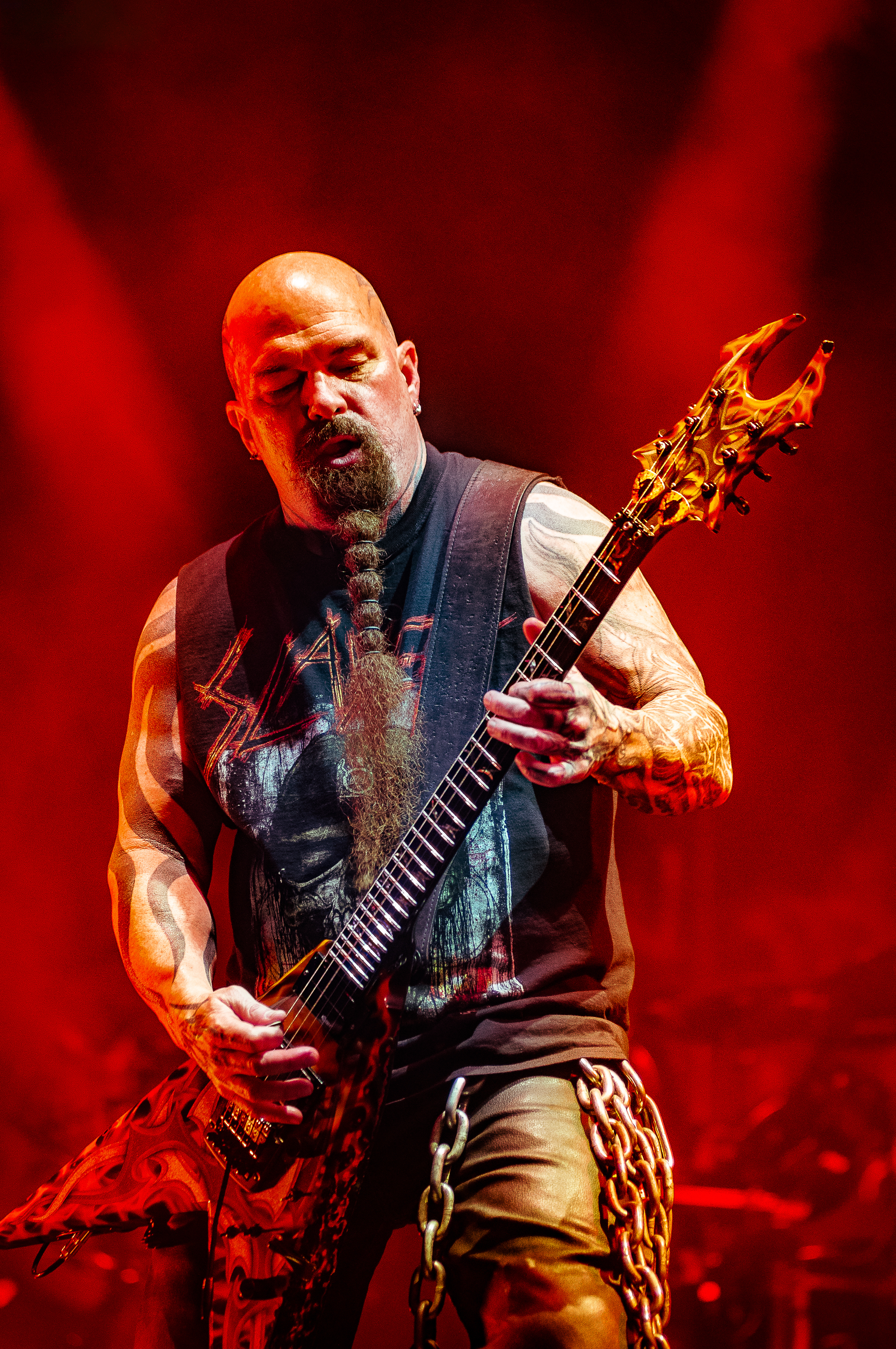
- King performing with Slayer in 2019

Background information
- Born: Kerry Ray King; June 3, 1964 (age 62); Los Angeles, California, U.S.
- Genre: Thrash metal
- Occupations: Musician; songwriter
- Instrument: Guitar
- Years active: 1981–present
- Label: Reigning Phoenix
- Member of: Slayer
- Website: kerrykingofficial.com

Kerry Ray King (born June 3, 1964) is an American musician, best known for being the co-lead guitarist and songwriter of thrash metal band Slayer. He co-founded the band with Jeff Hanneman in 1981 and is one of two members to stay with the band for its 45-year existence (with the exception of their 2019–2024 breakup), along with the frontman and bassist Tom Araya. King is also currently a solo artist, with his debut album From Hell I Rise released in May 2024.

== Biography ==
=== Early life ===
The youngest of three children, King was born and raised in Los Angeles, California. His father was an aircraft parts inspector, and his mother worked for a telephone company. He started learning guitar at the age of thirteen at his father's urging, saying "...my dad was trying to get me out of the wrong circles and give me a hobby." King attended three different high schools and had very good grades, even winning an award as his school's top math student in junior high. As the youngest child in the family, King says he was "spoilt" growing up. He learned guitar on his father's Gibson ES-175 and later had a Fender Stratocaster which he traded for a BC Rich Mockingbird, beginning a long relationship with BC Rich guitars. The first song he ever learned was Ted Nugent's "Cat Scratch Fever" and he soon became a fan of Van Halen and Judas Priest, which had a major influence on his guitar playing.

=== Slayer ===
King formed his first band with another guitarist who had been teaching him lessons, and this guitarist introduced him to Tom Araya. He discovered that he and Araya lived only a block away from each other, and they agreed to start jamming together. "Everything began from that point", King has said of Slayer's origins. In 1981, King was at an audition for a southern rock band which Jeff Hanneman was also auditioning for. King heard Hanneman playing guitar near the reception desk and approached him, soon learning that they liked a lot of the same music, and they decided to jam together. The pair enjoyed playing together and decided to start their own band with Araya and a neighborhood drummer named Dave Lombardo, which would soon evolve into Slayer. King, along with Araya, remained in Slayer for the entire length of the band's career, from 1981 to 2019 and since 2024.

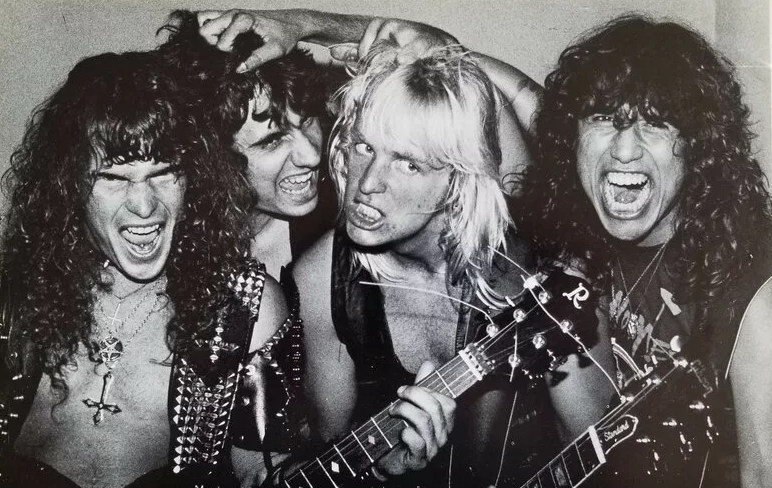
King (left) with Slayer in 1983

In 1984, King was invited by former Metallica guitarist Dave Mustaine to join his new band Megadeth. Slayer's future was briefly in doubt as King played several shows with Megadeth, though he ultimately did not join full-time due to his commitment to Slayer. He still lived with his parents and has said that the desire to not spend time at home with his family caused him to spend more time rehearsing with the band, which helped his musicianship improve tremendously.

King says at that time their music was viewed simply as heavy metal and the term "thrash" emerged later. He was becoming heavily influenced by the band Venom, which helped shape Slayer's dark image. King says that after releasing Haunting The Chapel and Hell Awaits and seeing the band's audience grow steadily, he knew Slayer would be his career. The controversy surrounding Slayer's 1986 song "Angel Of Death" fueled King to dedicate himself to songwriting. "I think, on the whole, that mankind is full of fucking idiots. In a nutshell, our lyrics just say 'think'. That's it", he said of the unwanted "Angel of Death" attention.

Slayer fared better than most bands after heavy metal's decline in the 1990s, which King describes as "the fuckin' Limp Bizkit era". King almost stopped writing music entirely due to how offensive he believed the music scene had become at that time. "I couldn't understand why anybody would make music like that, let alone like it. That was definitely my darkest time as a musician, and that definitely showed up on Diabolus in Musica... through my lack of involvement", he has said.

=== Solo career ===
In March 2020, when interviewed by Guitar World about his endorsement with Dean Guitars, King hinted that he would be working on new material for his first project since Slayer's disbandment, simply saying, "Dean didn't sign me for nothing!" King stated in an August 2020 interview on the Dean Guitars YouTube channel that he had "more than two records' worth of music". It was later confirmed that he and then-former Slayer bandmate Paul Bostaph were working on a new project that would "sound like Slayer without it being Slayer — but not intentionally so." In November 2023, King hinted that he was going to release the debut album by his new project in 2024; this project was later revealed to be his solo debut album, From Hell I Rise, released on May 17, 2024. The lineup on the album includes King, Bostaph, Death Angel vocalist Mark Osegueda, Hellyeah bassist Kyle Sanders, and Vio-lence and former Machine Head guitarist Phil Demmel. On May 7, 2024, he played his first solo show, which took place at Reggie's Rock Club in Chicago, Illinois. He then launched a European tour later that year.

In early 2025, he embarked on his first North American headlining tour with Municipal Waste and Alien Weaponry serving as support. As early as February 2025, King revealed his intention to work on a second solo album, confirming that he and Bostaph "have got 10, 12 songs demoed already" and that the "realistic goal" is to release it in early 2026. In an April 2025 interview with Rolling Stone Brasil, Kerry said, "What the plan is, is whenever [the] cycle [for From Hell I Rise] is done, and right now that looks to me like October, Paul and I have always talked about going straight from playing live, taking maybe a week off and go right in the studio to keep your tour chops, so you're firing on all cylinders — you don't gotta practice to get good; you're already good — and get in there and record it. During the Summer of that year his band toured throughout Europe. He also played the guitar in the newest version of WWE wrestler Damien Priest's theme song and has performed the song live at Wrestlemania.

He will appear in the 2026 video game Grand Theft Auto VI as the radio co-host of The Chamber 106.6 with Araya.

== Guest appearances ==
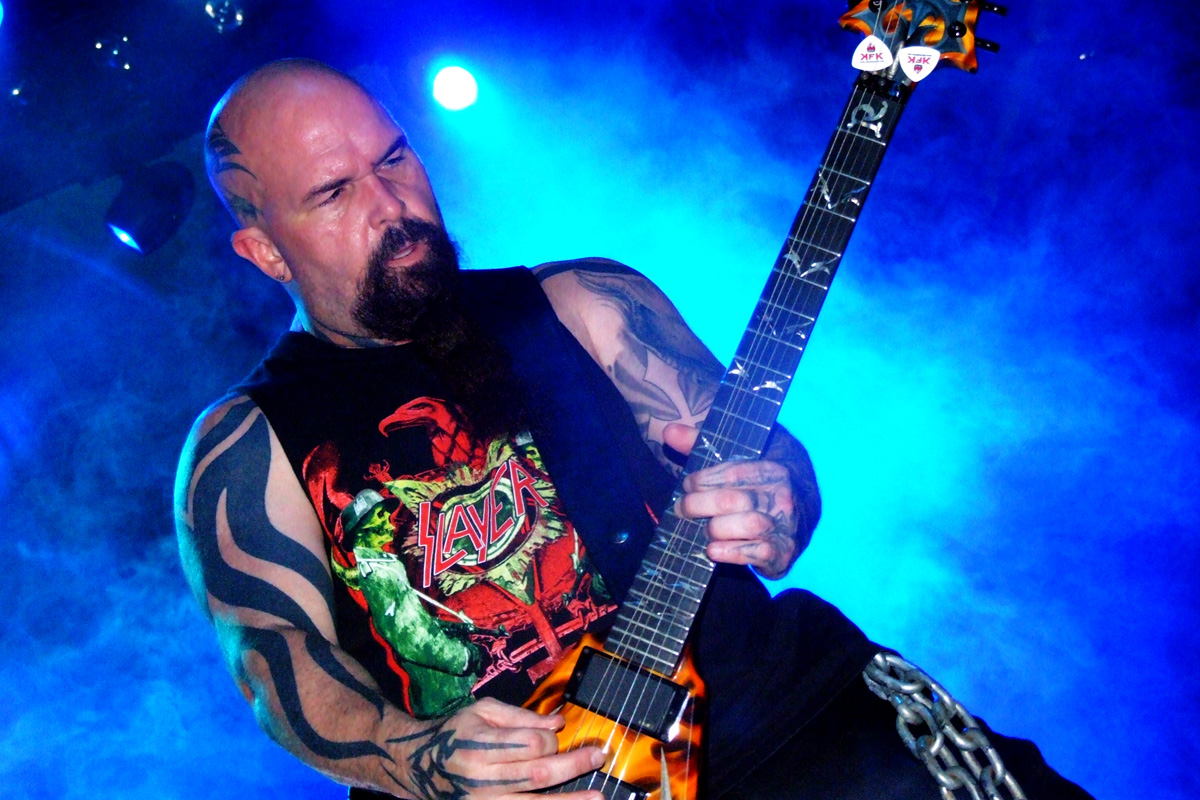
King in 2006

In addition to appearing on Slayer's albums, he has also made several guest appearances for other artists. While lending production to 1986's Reign in Blood, Rick Rubin was also helping with the production of the Beastie Boys' debut album Licensed to Ill. Rubin felt the track "No Sleep till Brooklyn" needed a guitar solo, so he called in King to lay down the part. King has since commented that his playing ability "certainly wasn't that of a virtuoso". The video for "No Sleep till Brooklyn", whose title was a spoof on Motörhead's 1981 live album No Sleep 'til Hammersmith, was originally intended to feature King being knocked offstage by a gorilla, but King refused. King replied, "If there's gonna be anyone knocking anyone offstage, it'll be me knocking the gorilla", which was what subsequently happened.

On Licensed to Ill, King also played the guitar solo on the song "(You Gotta) Fight for Your Right (To Party!)".

King contributed the main lead guitar solo and outro part to Pantera's song "Goddamn Electric", which appeared on the 2000 album, Reinventing the Steel. King's rig was set up in Pantera's bathroom backstage just after Ozzfest 1999 in Dallas, as the group still did not have their own dressing room, on top of not appearing on the festival bill.

King has also made several guest appearances on Marilyn Manson's Rape of the World Tour, joining the band to play tracks such as "Little Horn", "1996" and "Irresponsible Hate Anthem". Many fans noticed elements of King's own style used on these occasions.

He also appeared on an episode of Daniel Tosh's television series Tosh.0, alongside Corey Taylor of Slipknot. Both playing themselves as audience members.

On October 21, 2010, the final date of the Jägermeister Music Tour, King joined Megadeth on stage at the Gibson Amphitheater in Hollywood to perform "Rattlehead" which was the first time in 26 years that King had shared the stage with Megadeth (King had been a touring substitute for a few months in 1984).

King contributed a guitar solo on the title track for the 2010 album Witchkrieg by the Swedish blackened thrash band Witchery. He also appears in the music video playing his solo.

He made an appearance in the 2009 movie Brooklyn's Finest as a member of SWAT team led by Ethan Hawke's character. In 2022, he appeared in the comedy horror film Studio 666 as Krug.

In January 2025, King played on the theme song to professional wrestler Damian Priest. On April 20, 2025, King performed Priest's theme song live at WrestleMania 41.

== Style and influences ==
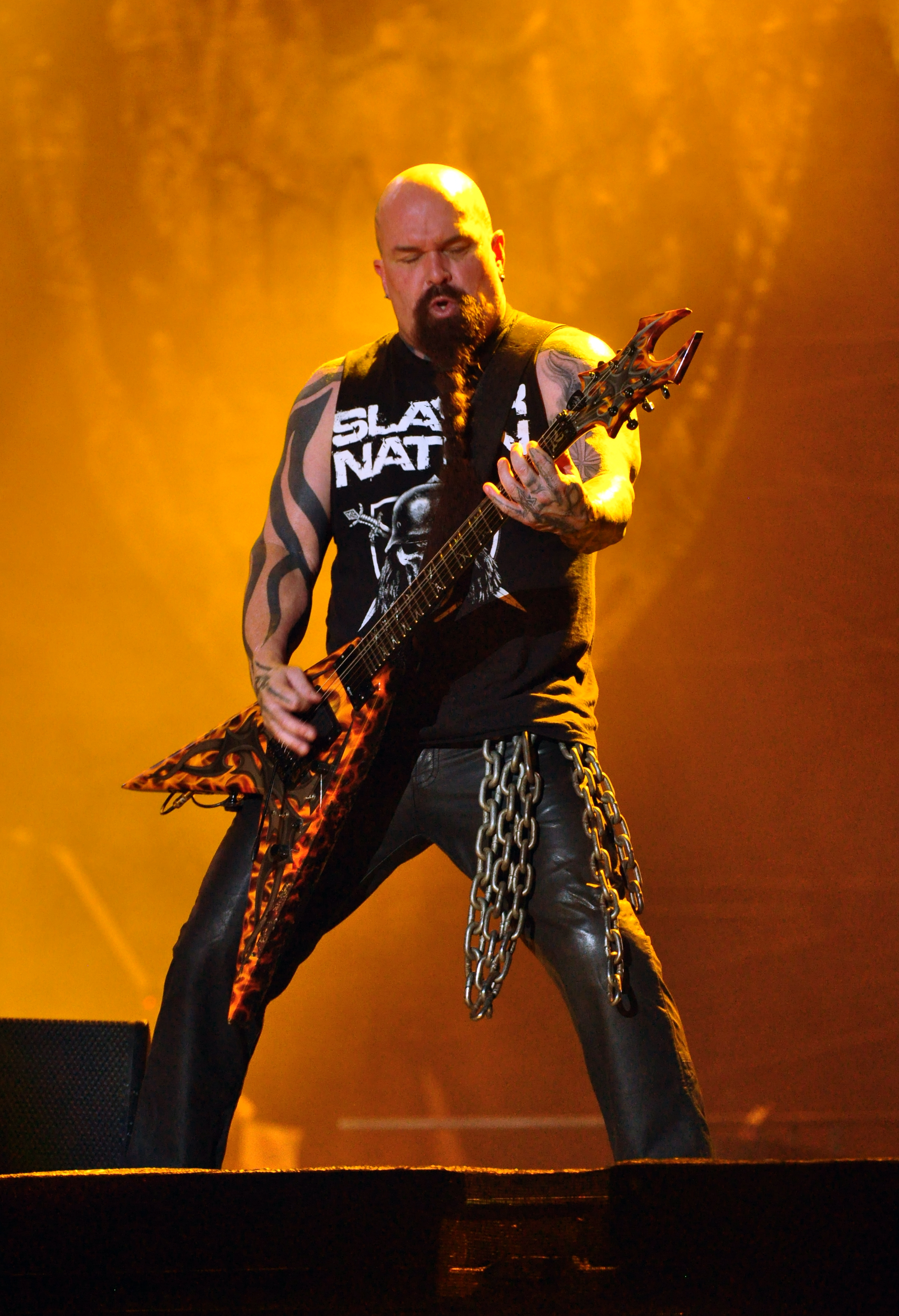
King performing with Slayer at Wacken Open Air 2014

King's first experience with a guitar was when he was a child. Steve Huey of AllMusic has commented in his review for Reign in Blood that Kerry King and Jeff Hanneman's demented soloing often mimics the screams of the songs' victims. He also described his and Jeff Hanneman's guitar solos as "wildly chaotic". Thom Jurek, also of AllMusic, described his work on 2006's Christ Illusion as creating "an intensely harrowing and angular riff that changes from verse to verse, through the refrain and bridge, and comes back again."

King listed Venom, Judas Priest, Iron Maiden, Deep Purple and Black Sabbath as his favorite bands during his teen years. He said once "Anybody who plays heavy music and doesn't cite Sabbath as an influence is lying, because that's where it all started." He cited Glenn Tipton and K. K. Downing of Judas Priest as his biggest influences as a guitarist that inspire his style, tone, and gear. He also mentioned Eddie Van Halen, Ted Nugent, Ronnie Montrose, Tony Iommi, Ritchie Blackmore, Michael Schenker, Dave Murray, Adrian Smith and Randy Rhoads as other influences. King also quoted Elton John, Eagles, Boston, Foreigner, J. Geils among his favorite non-metal artists.

== Personal life ==
King has been divorced twice and has a daughter named Shyanne Kymberlee King with his first wife; his current wife is Ayesha King. He claims he has never done drugs, though he has said "I'm quite an experienced drinker".

Prior to 2020, King had lived in California for almost all of his life. He relocated to Phoenix, Arizona around 1987, and while living there, he was a neighbor of Judas Priest singer Rob Halford. By the early 2000s, King had moved back to Los Angeles, and he would later relocate to Riverside County, California. In April 2020, King and Ayesha bought one home in Las Vegas, Nevada; as of November 2021, however, the couple resides in New York City.

King is an antitheist. He is known to oppose and strongly criticize organized religion by expressing his views in his songwriting. In a 2006 interview with Blabbermouth.net, King expressed his anti-religious views: "I don't really have a life philosophy; my thing is just rebelling against pretty much organized religion. That is my main thing, because personally I think it's a crutch for people that are too weak to get through life on their own. I'm the kind of guy that says if I don't see it, then it doesn't work. And nobody can show me God." When asked by Revolver Magazine what superpower would he want if he was a supervillain, King replied "the ability to burst a church into flames by simply walking by it."

King is an avid snake collector who owns a reptile house and herpetology nursery called Psychotic Exotics.

King has largely avoided politics, although he displayed sympathy for conservative radio host Rush Limbaugh in the past. In 2017, King said that he was "embarrassed about Trump's presidency," which he described as "divisive and polarizing." In 2024, while promoting his solo album, he stated that he was "pissed off" about the overturning of Roe v. Wade.

King's body has grown increasingly tattooed over his career, with Blender Magazine once producing a tour of his body ink. King's abbreviation, KFK, was revealed to mean "Kerry Fuckin' King" in the January 2007 Issue of Guitar World.

== Equipment ==
Brand	Name	Ref
Guitars		
B.C. Rich KKV	Signature V	
B.C. Rich KKW	"Metal Master Warlock"	
B.C. Rich KKV	"Speed V Handcrafted G2"	
B.C. Rich KKV	"Beast V N.T."	
B.C. Rich KKW	"Wartribe" 7 string	
Dean Guitars KKV	"USA King V Limited Edition 50PC Late 2019/Early 2020"	
Amplifiers and cabinets
Marshall	JCM-800 2203KK (Signature Model)(x3)	
Marshall	Mode Four 4x12 Cabinets (x6)	
Effects
Boss	RGE-10 Graphic EQ	
Korg	DTR-1 Rack Tuner	
Dunlop	DCR-1SR Crybaby Rack Wah	
Dunlop	KFKQZ1 Q-Zone Pedal (signature model)	
MXR	10 Band EQ Pedal (signature model)	
Shure	UHF Wireless System	
Voodoo Lab Ground Control	Pro floorboard	
Eventide	H3000S Harmonizer	
MXR	Smart Gate Pro	
Radial Tonebone Trimode	Classic Tube Distortion	

Name	Ref
Accessories	
Jim Dunlop Signature Strings
Monster Cable
MM Guitar Picks
Kahler Tremolo System (model 2315)
Dragon Cases
EMG 81 (bridge) (only for 6-string)
EMG 85 (neck) (only for 6-string)
EMG PA2 Gain Boost Switch
EMG SA (neck) (Used for 6-strings equipped with Fernandes Sustainer)
Fernandes FSK-401 Sustainer (neck) (Seated next to EMG S)
Fernandes FSK-101 Sustainer (Neck) (For 6-string when neck pickup isn't needed)
EMG 81-7 (bridge) (only for 7-string)
EMG 707 (neck) (only for 7-string)

== Band members ==
Current members

- Kerry King – guitars (2019–present)
- Paul Bostaph – drums (2019–present)
- Phil Demmel – guitars (2023–present)
- Mark Osegueda – vocals (2023–present)
- Kyle Sanders – bass (2023–present)

== Discography ==
Slayer

Main article: Slayer discography

Year	Album	Ref
1983	Show No Mercy	
1984	Haunting the Chapel	
1984	Live Undead	
1985	Hell Awaits	
1986	Reign in Blood	
1988	South of Heaven	
1990	Seasons in the Abyss	
1991	Decade of Aggression	
1994	Divine Intervention	
1996	Undisputed Attitude	
1998	Diabolus in Musica	
2001	God Hates Us All	
2006	Eternal Pyre	
2006	Christ Illusion	
2009	World Painted Blood	
2015	Repentless	

Solo

Year	Album	Ref
2024	From Hell I Rise	
2027	The End of All Gods	

Guest appearances

Year	Song	Artist	Ref
1986	"No Sleep till Brooklyn"	Beastie Boys	
1986	"(You Gotta) Fight for Your Right (To Party!)"	Beastie Boys	
2000	"Goddamn Electric"	Pantera	
2001	"Dead Girl Superstar"	Rob Zombie	
2001	"Final Prayer"	Hatebreed	
2002	"What We're All About"	Sum 41	
2010	"Witchkrieg"	Witchery	

== Awards ==
King won two Grammy Awards for Best Metal Performance as a member of Slayer in 2007 and 2008 for their songs "Eyes of the Insane" and "Final Six". In 2008 King received the Golden God Award at that years Metal Hammer Golden Gods Awards. In 2009 both he and bandmate Jeff Hanneman won the Worlds Most Mind-Blowing Guitarists award at that year Revolver Golden Gods Awards. In 2010 he was awarded the God of Riffs Award from the Metal Hammer Germany Awards. His debut album From Hell I Rise topped Rolling Stone's ranking of the best metal albums of 2024.
