= Tom Araya =

Chilean musician

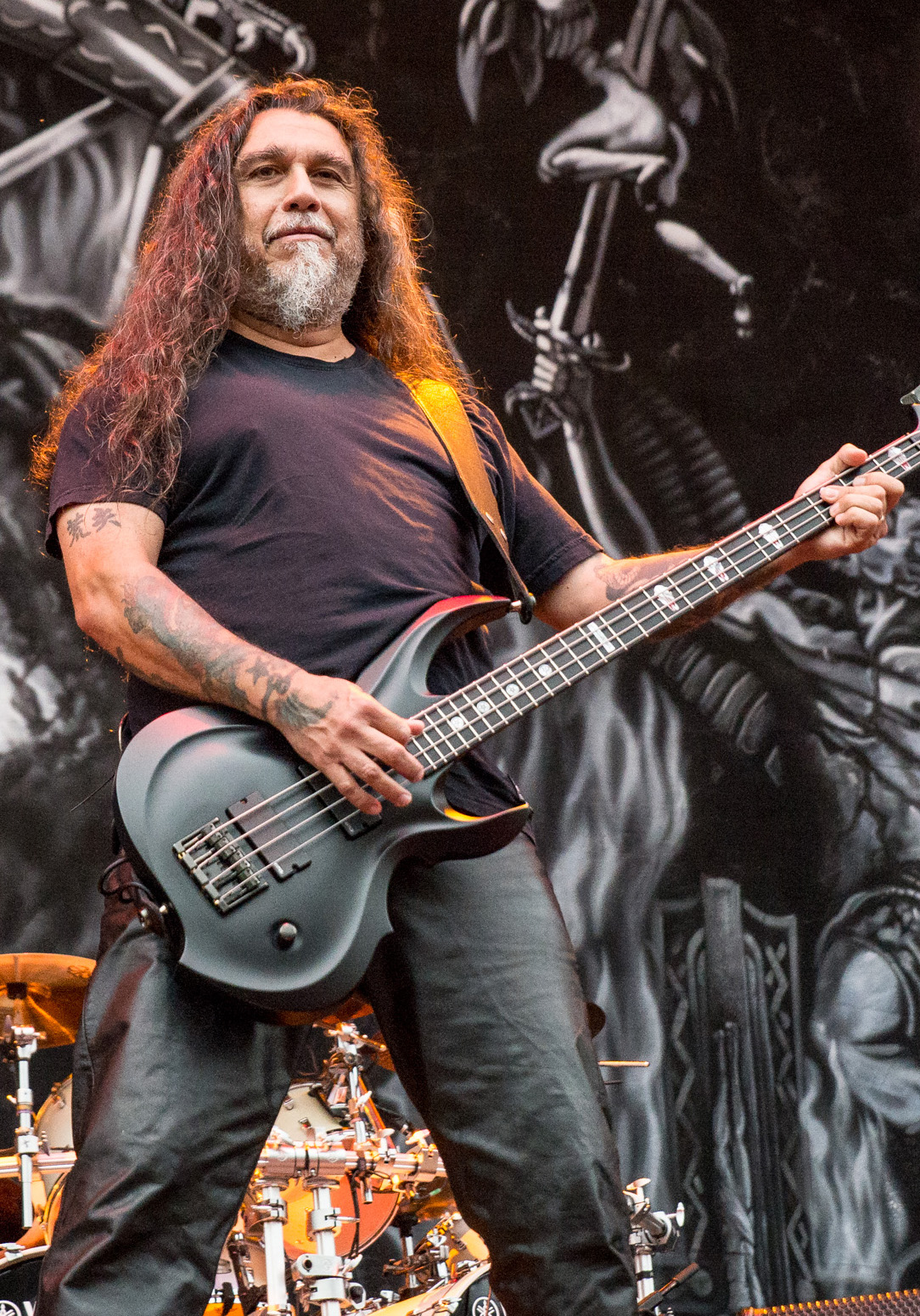
- Araya performing with Slayer in 2016

Background information
- Born: Tomás Enrique Araya Díaz; June 6, 1961 (age 65); Viña del Mar, Chile
- Origin: Los Angeles, California, U.S.
- Genre: Thrash metal
- Occupation: Musician
- Instruments: Vocals; bass guitar
- Years active: 1981–2019; 2024–present
- Member of: Slayer
- Website: slayer.net

Tomás Enrique "Tom" Araya Díaz (Spanish: [tom aˈɾaʝa]; born June 6, 1961) is a Chilean-American musician, best known as the vocalist and bassist of the thrash metal band Slayer. He was ranked 58th by Hit Parader on their list of the 100 Greatest Metal Vocalists of All Time, and 42nd on Loudwire list of the 66 greatest Hard Rock / Metal Frontman of All Time List. Araya, along with the guitarist Kerry King, are the only two members who stayed in the band since its inception, winning two Grammy Awards and selling 20 million albums worldwide.

Araya was employed as a respiratory therapist in the early 1980s and used his earnings to finance Slayer's debut album Show No Mercy (1983). Much of Araya's lyrical content is about serial killers, a subject he finds interesting; his first credited lyrical contribution was the vampire-themed track "At Dawn They Sleep" from 1985's Hell Awaits.

== Early life ==
Tomás Enrique Araya Diaz was born in Viña del Mar, Chile, to Chilean parents. His family moved to the U.S. when he was five. He grew up in Los Angeles. Araya grew up speaking Spanish. Upon his move to the U.S., his parents hired a teacher to help him and his siblings learn English. His older brother, Cisco, played guitar. This inspired Araya to pick up bass at age eight. The two played Beatles and Rolling Stones songs, which he would later cite as an influence on his own music. He attended both South Gate High School and Bell High School graduating in 1979.

In the early 1980s, Araya's eldest sister suggested he enroll in a program to become certified as a respiratory therapist. Araya's father insisted he either find a job or enroll in the course. Araya enrolled in a two-year technical course, learning about air mixture ratios, drawing blood, and how to intubate.

== Career ==
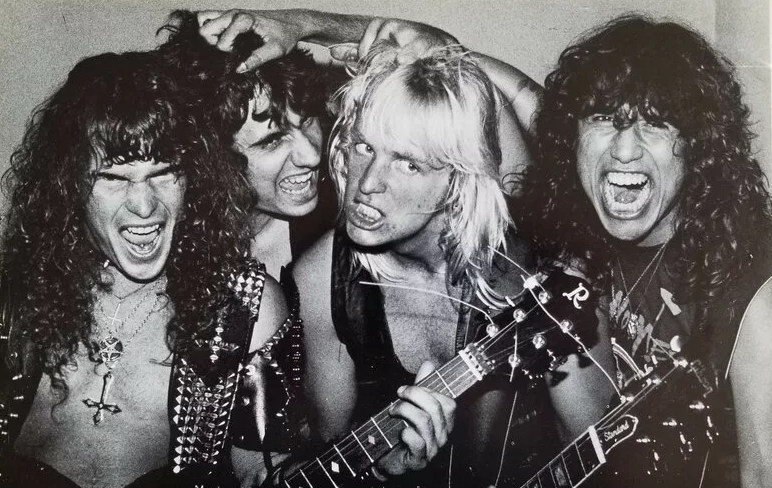
Araya (right) with Slayer in 1983

In 1981, Araya was approached by Kerry King, who asked Araya to join his band, Slayer. Araya accepted, using his earnings as a respiratory therapist to finance the band's 1983 debut album Show No Mercy. Araya requested time off of work from his employer, the Brotman Medical Center, for Slayer's first European tour in 1984 and was denied; "'We need you to come in today.' They'd call me at 5:00 in the morning and wake me, 'Someone's not coming in, we need you to come in to work.'" After a month of sporadic attendance, his employers threatened termination; Araya replied "Well, I guess I'm fired." Along with King, Araya is one of the two original members to remain in Slayer for the entire length of the band's career, having been in the band since 1981.

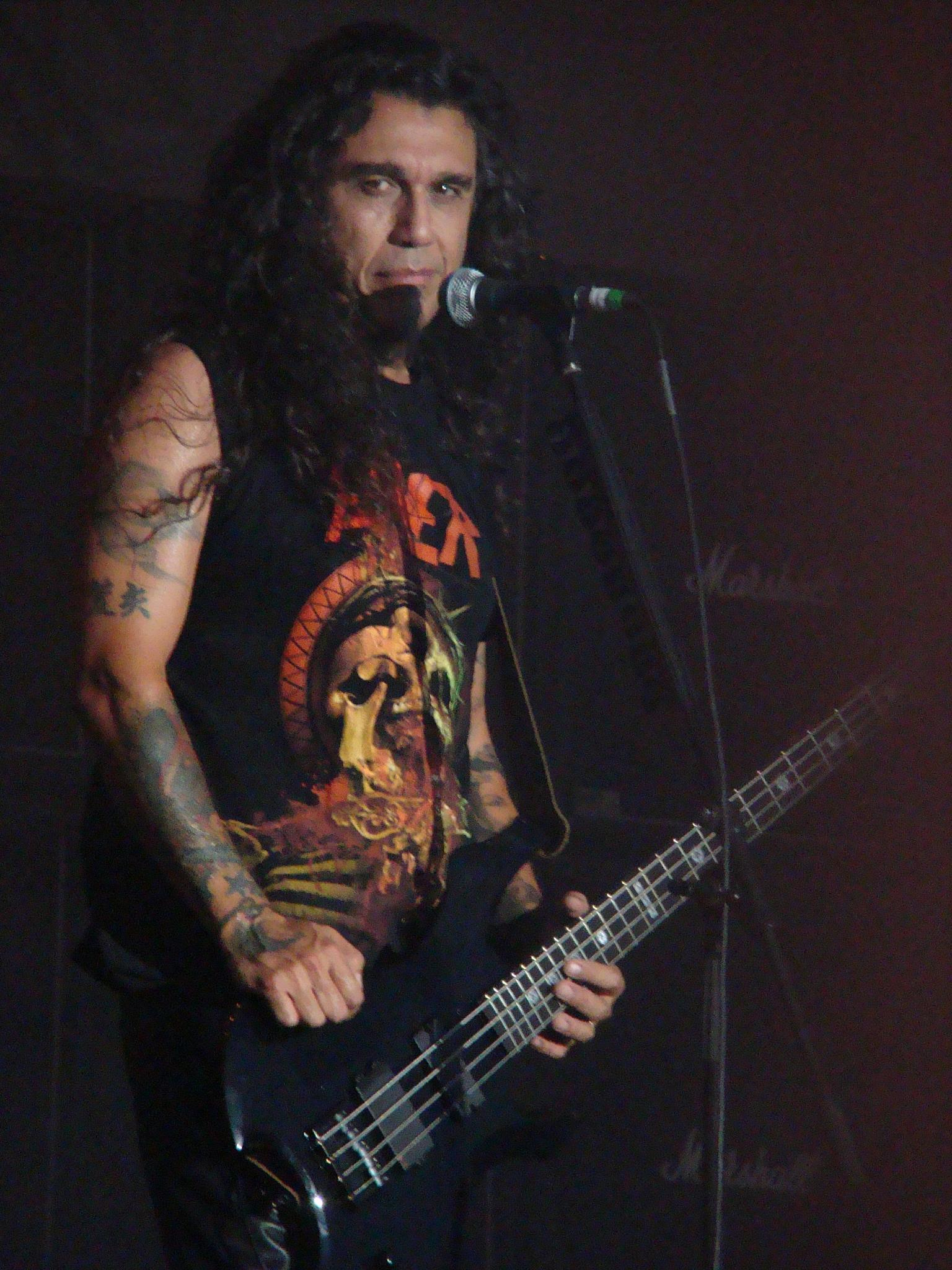
Araya at Gods of Metal 2008

In 2006, Araya underwent gallbladder surgery, which disrupted The Unholy Alliance tour. Originally set to launch on June 6, the tour was postponed to June 13. Araya was also unable to finish the vocals for a song entitled "Final Six", which was to be included on Slayer's 2006 album Christ Illusion; later released on the special edition of the album. Araya brought his children on the tour stating "it's kind of cool to expose them at such a young age. My first concert, I was, like, 17." "We [Slayer] have been fortunate- fortunate enough to have lasted as long as we have because a lot of bands don't last that long."

Slayer announced in January 2010 that back surgery had been scheduled for Araya and that the planned tour would be canceled through April of that year. Araya was known for his aggressive headbanging and began experiencing back problems while the band was on tour in Australia/New Zealand/Japan in October 2009. He had an anterior cervical discectomy and fusion, saying "It seems to have done the trick but I can't headbang anymore." As a result of his surgery, Araya has significantly tempered his once aggressive on-stage movement, now remaining relatively still during performances. He has stated that he misses headbanging and the "physical connection".

On May 20, 2010, Slayer confirmed that they would play two songs on TV for Jimmy Kimmel Live!

In 2014, Araya made a cameo in the heavy metal horror film Hairmetal Shotgun Zombie Massacre: The Movie, directed by Joshua Allan Vargas.

From May 2018 to November 2019, with the last show being in their hometown Los Angeles, Slayer embarked on what they called their final world tour and dissolved.

Following the conclusion of Slayer's farewell tour, Araya remained out of the public eye for several years.

In February of 2024, just weeks after Kerry King stated that he had not spoken to Araya since the conclusion of Slayer's farewell tour, Slayer announced that they would be reuniting for two reunion shows in the fall of that year. Araya stated, "Nothing compares to the 90 minutes when we're onstage playing live, sharing that intense energy with our fans."

He will appear in the 2026 video game Grand Theft Auto VI as the radio co-host of The Chamber 106.6 with King.

=== Lyrics ===
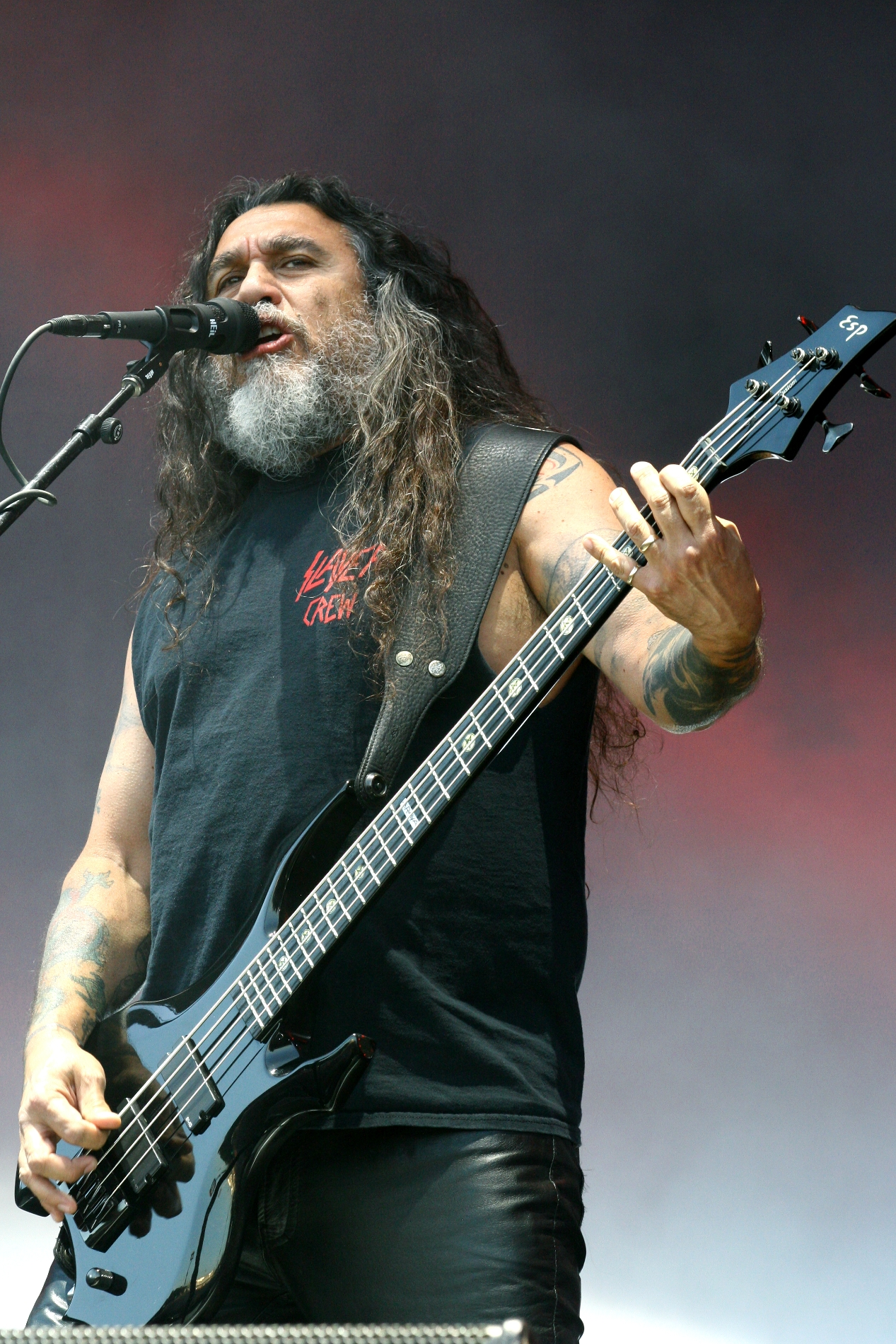
Araya performing at Rock im Park 2014

Araya's interest in serial killers serves as inspiration for many of his lyrics, such as "213" about Jeffrey Dahmer and "Dead Skin Mask" about Ed Gein. He stated "I'm trying to see where these guys are coming from so maybe I'll understand. It's always kind of intrigued me..."

Araya has also noted many of his lyrics are inspired by real world events. He wrote the lyrics for the Grammy Award-winning song "Eyes of the Insane" from Slayer's 2006 album Christ Illusion. The lyrics were inspired by an article in the Texas Monthly about the casualties of war and the experiences of soldiers coping with physical and psychological trauma. Araya stated, "At points in their tour of Iraq, they need help and the military tends to ignore that, they kind of brush it under the mat and hopes it goes away. They try to make everything seem hunky dory and fine and dandy, when in actuality there is a lot of stuff going on that people can't handle. There's a lot of soldiers coming home with mental anguish. And the sad part is, we heard about post-traumatic stress after Vietnam and the first Gulf War and the military seems to want to wipe the slate clean with every new war."

== Style and influences ==
Despite being in a metal band, Araya had never heard of metal music until he joined Slayer in 1981, once stating that he did not know who Iron Maiden was in response to Kerry King suggesting songs the band should learn. In an 2011, interview he stated that he was influenced to become a bass player by hard rock and acid rock acts such as Cream, Jimi Hendrix, The Animals and Jefferson Airplane. Araya also noted that he has a tough time listening to other metal acts due to not wanting to be influenced by them, stating he wants his ideas to be "fresh and are truly mine."

Vocally he is known for his rawness, intensity and screaming. Araya reports that he sings country songs to help keep his "singing chops up".

== Personal life ==
Araya has a brother, Juan "Johnny" Araya, who currently plays bass in the melodic death metal band Thine Eyes Bleed. He has also occasionally worked as a roadie for Slayer.

Araya resides in Texas, where he owns a ranch with his wife Sandra Araya and two children, daughter Ariel Asa Araya (b. 1996) and son Tomas Enrique Araya Jr. (b. 1998). He and his wife run a family ranch that includes 60+ head of cattle among other ranch animals. Araya and his wife enjoy horror films such as The Amityville Horror and The Texas Chain Saw Massacre. The two allowed their children to watch horror films, but made it clear to them that it is just a movie when they asked "Is this real?" His children were homeschooled.

In 2009, he and his family began training in Karate for self defense purposes, Araya later achieved his black belt in the martial art.

In 2011, Araya received the keys to the city of his birth, Viña del Mar.

Araya suffers from sleep apnea and uses a CPAP machine regularly at home and on tour.

=== Religion ===
Araya is a practicing Catholic. In an interview, he expressed his belief that "Christ came and taught us about love, about doing unto others. That was his preach: Accept each other for who we are. Live peacefully, and love one another." When asked if he believed in God, he replied "I believe in a supreme being, yeah. But He's an all-loving God." Araya explained that he has a "really strong belief system", and Slayer's images and words will "never interfere with what I believe and how I feel... People are not in good shape to where they have to question their own belief system because of a book or a story somebody wrote, or a Slayer song."

Commenting about the misconception of the band labeled as Satan worshippers, he said "Yeah, yeah I think that's one of the biggest misconceptions towards the band, but next to that just the fact that we're normal." Referencing Kerry King's lyrics, Araya said "I'm not one that's going to go, 'This sucks because it's contrary to my beliefs.' To me it's more like 'This is really good stuff. You're going to piss people off with this.'"

In 2016, Araya further explained that the main reason Slayer used satanic imagery was to scare people, in particular, the "Hollywood people", wanting to separate themselves from the "androgynous Sunset Strip metal scene of the 1980s".

== Discography ==
=== Slayer ===
- 1983: Show No Mercy
- 1984: Haunting the Chapel
- 1985: Hell Awaits
- 1986: Reign in Blood
- 1988: South of Heaven
- 1990: Seasons in the Abyss
- 1994: Divine Intervention
- 1996: Undisputed Attitude
- 1998: Diabolus in Musica
- 2001: God Hates Us All
- 2006: Christ Illusion
- 2009: World Painted Blood
- 2015: Repentless

=== Guest appearances ===
- Dirt with Alice in Chains (1992)
- Primitive with Soulfly (2000)
- Rise Above: 24 Black Flag Songs to Benefit the West Memphis Three with Rollins Band (2002)

== Equipment ==
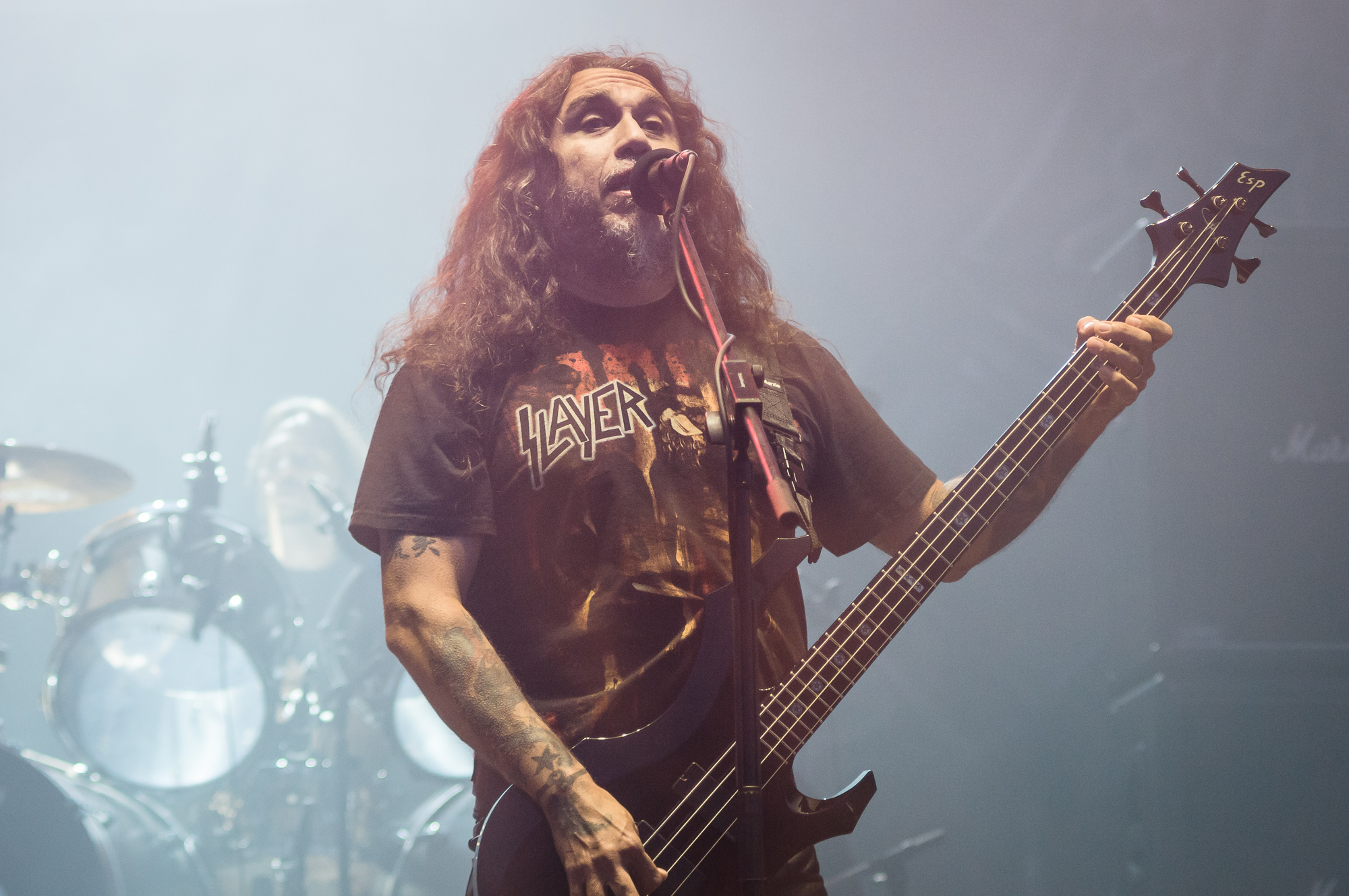
Araya playing his ESP signature bass in 2012

Araya endorses Marshall amplifiers and ESP guitars which are currently marketing Tom Araya signature bass guitars. He was one of the first bassists to have a signature ESP bass series.

- ESP – Tom Araya signature bass
- B.C. Rich bass guitars
- Fender Precision Bass (seen in early photos of Slayer live performances)
- EMG pickups
- Bartolini pickups
- Dunlop strings 50-110 (heavy, stainless steel)
- D'Addario Picks and straps (he used his fingers before 1988's South of Heaven)
- Marshall VBA400
- Marshall 8x10 cabinet
