= List of songs recorded by Slayer =

A list of songs recorded by American thrash metal band Slayer.

== List ==
Key
†	Indicates single release
‡	Indicates cover version

Name of song, writer(s), original release, and year of release
Song	Writer(s)		Original release	Year	Ref.
Song	Lyrics	Music	Original release	Year	Ref.
"213"	Tom Araya	Jeff Hanneman	Divine Intervention	1994	
"Abolish Government / Superficial Love" ‡ (T.S.O.L. cover)	Jack Grisham; Ron Emory; Mike Roche; Todd Barnes		Undisputed Attitude	1996	
"Addict"	Kerry King	Jeff Hanneman	God Hates Us All (Japanese edition)	2001	
"Aggressive Perfector"	Jeff Hanneman; Kerry King		Metal Massacre Vol. 3	1983	
"Altar of Sacrifice"	Kerry King	Jeff Hanneman	Reign in Blood	1986	
"Americon"	Kerry King		World Painted Blood	2009	
"Angel of Death" †	Jeff Hanneman		Reign in Blood	1986	
"The Antichrist"	Jeff Hanneman	Jeff Hanneman; Kerry King	Show No Mercy	1983	
"At Dawn They Sleep"	Jeff Hanneman; Kerry King; Tom Araya	Jeff Hanneman	Hell Awaits	1985	
"Atrocity Vendor"	Tom Araya; Kerry King	Kerry King	Repentless	2015	
"Beauty Through Order"	Jeff Hanneman; Tom Araya	Jeff Hanneman	World Painted Blood	2009	
"Behind the Crooked Cross"	Jeff Hanneman		South of Heaven	1988	
"Bitter Peace"	Jeff Hanneman		Diabolus in Musica	1998	
"Black Magic"	Kerry King	Jeff Hanneman; Kerry King	Show No Mercy	1983	
"Black Serenade"	Jeff Hanneman; Tom Araya	Jeff Hanneman	Christ Illusion	2006	
"Blood Red"	Tom Araya	Jeff Hanneman	Seasons in the Abyss	1990	
"Bloodline" †	Jeff Hanneman; Tom Araya	Jeff Hanneman; Kerry King	God Hates Us All	2001	
"Born of Fire"	Kerry King	Jeff Hanneman; Kerry King	Seasons in the Abyss	1990	
"Born to Be Wild" ‡ (Steppenwolf cover)	Mars Bonfire		NASCAR on FOX Crank It Up	2002	
"Can't Stand You" ‡ (Pap Smear cover)	Jeff Hanneman		Undisputed Attitude	1996	
"Captor of Sin"	Jeff Hanneman; Kerry King		Haunting the Chapel	1984	
"Cast Down"	Kerry King		God Hates Us All	2001	
"Cast the First Stone"	Kerry King		Repentless	2015	
"Catalyst"	Kerry King		Christ Illusion	2006	
"Catatonic"	Kerry King		Christ Illusion	2006	
"Chasing Death"	Kerry King		Repentless	2015	
"Chemical Warfare"	Jeff Hanneman; Kerry King		Haunting the Chapel	1984	
"Circle of Beliefs"	Kerry King		Divine Intervention	1994	
"Cleanse the Soul"	Tom Araya; Kerry King	Jeff Hanneman	South of Heaven	1988	
"Consfearacy"	Kerry King		Christ Illusion	2006	
"Criminally Insane"	Jeff Hanneman; Kerry King	Jeff Hanneman; Kerry King	Reign in Blood	1986	
"Crionics"	Jeff Hanneman; Kerry King	Jeff Hanneman; Kerry King	Show No Mercy	1983	
"Crypts of Eternity"	Jeff Hanneman; Kerry King; Tom Araya	Jeff Hanneman; Kerry King	Hell Awaits	1985	
"Cult" †	Kerry King		Christ Illusion	2006	
"Darkness of Christ"	Kerry King	Jeff Hanneman	God Hates Us All	2001	
"DDAMM (Drunk Drivers Against Mad Mothers)" ‡ (Pap Smear cover)	Jeff Hanneman		Undisputed Attitude	1996	
"Dead Skin Mask"	Tom Araya	Jeff Hanneman	Seasons in the Abyss	1990	
"Death's Head"	Jeff Hanneman		Diabolus in Musica	1998	
"Delusions of Saviour"	Instrumental	Kerry King	Repentless	2015	
"Desire"	Tom Araya	Jeff Hanneman	Diabolus in Musica	1998	
"Deviance"	Jeff Hanneman; Tom Araya	Jeff Hanneman	God Hates Us All	2001	
"Die by the Sword"	Jeff Hanneman		Show No Mercy	1983	
"Dittohead"	Kerry King		Divine Intervention	1994	
"Disciple"	Kerry King	Jeff Hanneman	God Hates Us All	2001	
"Disintegration / Free Money" ‡ (Verbal Abuse cover)	Eric Mastrokalos; Brett Dodwell; Roy Hansen		Undisputed Attitude	1996	
"Dissident Aggressor" ‡ (Judas Priest cover)	Glenn Tipton; Rob Halford; K. K. Downing		South of Heaven	1988	
"Divine Intervention"	Tom Araya; Paul Bostaph; Jeff Hanneman; Kerry King	Jeff Hanneman; Kerry King	Divine Intervention	1994	
"Epidemic"	Kerry King	Jeff Hanneman; Kerry King	Reign in Blood	1986	
"Evil Has No Boundaries"	Jeff Hanneman; Kerry King	Kerry King	Show No Mercy	1983	
"Exile"	Kerry King		God Hates Us All	2001	
"Expendable Youth"	Tom Araya	Kerry King	Seasons in the Abyss	1990	
"Eyes of the Insane" †	Tom Araya	Jeff Hanneman	Christ Illusion	2006	
"Fictional Reality"	Kerry King		Divine Intervention	1994	
"Fight Till Death"	Jeff Hanneman		Show No Mercy	1983	
"Filler / I Don't Want to Hear It" ‡ (Minor Threat cover)	Ian MacKaye; Lyle Preslar; Brian Baker; Jeff Nelson		Undisputed Attitude	1996	
"The Final Command"	Kerry King	Jeff Hanneman; Kerry King	Show No Mercy	1983	
"Final Six"	Jeff Hanneman; Tom Araya	Jeff Hanneman	Christ Illusion (Special edition)	2006	
"Flesh Storm"	Kerry King		Christ Illusion	2006	
"Gemini"	Tom Araya	Kerry King	Undisputed Attitude	1996	
"Ghosts of War"	Kerry King	Jeff Hanneman; Kerry King	South of Heaven	1988	
"God Send Death"	Jeff Hanneman; Tom Araya	Jeff Hanneman	God Hates Us All	2001	
"Guilty of Being White" ‡ (Minor Threat cover)	Ian MacKaye		Undisputed Attitude	1996	
"Hallowed Point"	Jeff Hanneman; Tom Araya	Jeff Hanneman; Kerry King	Seasons in the Abyss	1990	
"Hand of Doom"‡ (Black Sabbath cover)	Ozzy Osbourne; Tony Iommi; Geezer Butler; Bill Ward		Nativity in Black II	2000	
"Hardening of the Arteries"	Jeff Hanneman		Hell Awaits	1985	
"Hate Worldwide" †	Kerry King		World Painted Blood	2009	
"Haunting the Chapel"	Jeff Hanneman; Kerry King		Haunting the Chapel	1984	
"Hell Awaits"	Kerry King	Jeff Hanneman; Kerry King	Hell Awaits	1985	
"Here Comes the Pain"	Kerry King		God Hates Us All	2001	
"Human Disease"	Jeff Hanneman; Kerry King; Tom Araya		Bride of Chucky	1998	
"Human Strain"	Jeff Hanneman; Tom Araya	Jeff Hanneman	World Painted Blood	2009	
"I Hate You" † ‡ (Verbal Abuse cover)	Eric Mastrokalos; Brett Dodwell; Roy Hansen		Undisputed Attitude	1996	
"Implode" †	Kerry King		Repentless	2015	
"In-A-Gadda-Da-Vida" (Iron Butterfly cover)	Doug Ingle		Less than Zero (soundtrack)	1987	
"In the Name of God"	Kerry King		Diabolus in Musica	1998	
"I'm Gonna Be Your God" (Note: Recorded by the Stooges as "I Wanna Be Your Dog".) ‡ (The Stooges cover)	James Osterberg; Ron Asheton; Scott Asheton; Dave Alexander		Undisputed Attitude	1996	
"Jesus Saves"	Kerry King	Jeff Hanneman; Kerry King	Reign in Blood	1986	
"Jihad"	Jeff Hanneman; Tom Araya	Jeff Hanneman	Christ Illusion	2006	
"Kill Again"	Kerry King	Jeff Hanneman; Kerry King	Hell Awaits	1985	
"Killing Fields"	Tom Araya	Kerry King	Divine Intervention	1994	
"Live Undead"	Tom Araya; Kerry King	Jeff Hanneman	South of Heaven	1988	
"Love to Hate"	Jeff Hanneman; Kerry King	Jeff Hanneman	Diabolus in Musica	1998	
"Mandatory Suicide"	Tom Araya	Jeff Hanneman; Kerry King	South of Heaven	1988	
"Metalstorm / Face the Slayer" (Note: The writing credits for "Metal Storm / Face The Slayer" only apply to "Face The Slayer". No credits for "Metal Storm" appear in the liner notes.)	Kerry King	Jeff Hanneman; Kerry King	Show No Mercy	1983	
"Mind Control"	Tom Araya; Kerry King	Jeff Hanneman; Kerry King	Divine Intervention	1994	
"Mr. Freeze" ‡ (Dr. Know cover)	Kyle Toucher		Undisputed Attitude	1996	
"Necrophobic"	Jeff Hanneman; Kerry King	Jeff Hanneman; Kerry King	Reign in Blood	1986	
"Necrophiliac"	Jeff Hanneman; Kerry King	Jeff Hanneman	Hell Awaits	1985	
"New Faith"	Kerry King		God Hates Us All	2001	
"Not of This God"	Kerry King		World Painted Blood	2009	
"Overt Enemy"	Jeff Hanneman		Diabolus in Musica	1998	
"Payback"	Kerry King		God Hates Us All	2001	
"Perversions of Pain"	Kerry King	Jeff Hanneman	Diabolus in Musica	1998	
"Piano Wire"	Jeff Hanneman		Repentless	2015	
"Piece by Piece"	Kerry King		Reign in Blood	1986	
"Playing with Dolls"	Jeff Hanneman; Kerry King; Tom Araya	Jeff Hanneman	World Painted Blood	2009	
"Point"	Kerry King	Jeff Hanneman	Diabolus in Musica	1998	
"Postmortem" †	Jeff Hanneman		Reign in Blood	1986	
"Praise of Death"	Jeff Hanneman	Kerry King	Hell Awaits	1985	
"Pride in Prejudice"	Kerry King		Repentless	2015	
"Psychopathy Red" †	Jeff Hanneman		World Painted Blood	2009	
"Public Display of Dismemberment"	Kerry King		World Painted Blood	2009	
"Raining Blood" †	Jeff Hanneman; Kerry King	Jeff Hanneman	Reign in Blood	1986	
"Read Between the Lines"	Tom Araya; Kerry King	Jeff Hanneman	South of Heaven	1988	
"Reborn"	Kerry King	Jeff Hanneman	Reign in Blood	1986	
"Repentless" †	Kerry King		Repentless	2015	
"Richard Hung Himself" ‡ (D.I. cover)	Casey Royer; Frederic Taccone		Undisputed Attitude	1996	
"Scarstruck"	Kerry King		God Hates Us All (Japanese edition)	2001	
"Screaming from the Sky"	Tom Araya; Jeff Hanneman; Kerry King	Jeff Hanneman	Diabolus in Musica	1998	
"Scrum"	Kerry King	Jeff Hanneman	Diabolus in Musica	1998	
"Seasons in the Abyss" †	Tom Araya	Jeff Hanneman	Seasons in the Abyss	1990	
"Serenity in Murder" †	Tom Araya	Jeff Hanneman; Kerry King	Divine Intervention	1994	
"Seven Faces"	Kerry King		God Hates Us All	2001	
"Sex. Murder. Art."	Tom Araya	Kerry King	Divine Intervention	1994	
"Show No Mercy"	Kerry King		Show No Mercy	1983	
"Silent Scream"	Tom Araya	Jeff Hanneman; Kerry King	South of Heaven	1988	
"Skeleton Christ"	Kerry King		Christ Illusion	2006	
"Skeletons of Society"	Kerry King		Seasons in the Abyss	1990	
"South of Heaven"	Tom Araya	Jeff Hanneman	South of Heaven	1988	
"Spill the Blood"	Jeff Hanneman		South of Heaven	1988	
"Spirit in Black"	Kerry King	Jeff Hanneman	Seasons in the Abyss	1990	
"Spiritual Law" ‡ (D.I. cover)	Casey Royer		Undisputed Attitude	1996	
"Snuff"	Kerry King		World Painted Blood	2009	
"SS-3"	Jeff Hanneman	Jeff Hanneman; Kerry King	Divine Intervention	1994	
"Stain of Mind" †	Kerry King	Jeff Hanneman	Diabolus in Musica	1998	
"Supremist"	Kerry King		Christ Illusion	2006	
"Take Control"	Kerry King		Repentless	2015	
"Temptation"	Kerry King		Seasons in the Abyss	1990	
"Threshold"	Kerry King	Jeff Hanneman	God Hates Us All	2001	
"Tormentor"	Jeff Hanneman		Show No Mercy	1983	
"Unguarded Instinct"	Kerry King	Jeff Hanneman	Diabolus in Musica (Japanese edition)	1998	
"Unit 731"	Jeff Hanneman		World Painted Blood	2009	
"Verbal Abuse / Leeches" ‡ (Verbal Abuse cover)	Eric Mastrokalos; Brett Dodwell; Roy Hansen		Undisputed Attitude	1996	
"Vices"	Kerry King		Repentless	2015	
"Violent Pacification" ‡ (D.R.I. cover)	Colin Blyth; Colin Abrahall; Ross Lomas		Undisputed Attitude (Japanese edition)	1996	
"War Ensemble"	Jeff Hanneman; Tom Araya	Jeff Hanneman	Seasons in the Abyss	1990	
"War Zone"	Kerry King		God Hates Us All	2001	
"When the Stillness Comes" †	Kerry King		Repentless	2015	
"Wicked"	Tom Araya; Paul Bostaph	Jeff Hanneman; Kerry King	Diabolus in Musica (Japanese edition)	1998	
"World Painted Blood" †	Jeff Hanneman; Tom Araya	Jeff Hanneman	World Painted Blood	2009	
"You Against You"	Kerry King		Repentless	2015	
