= Slayer =

American thrash metal band

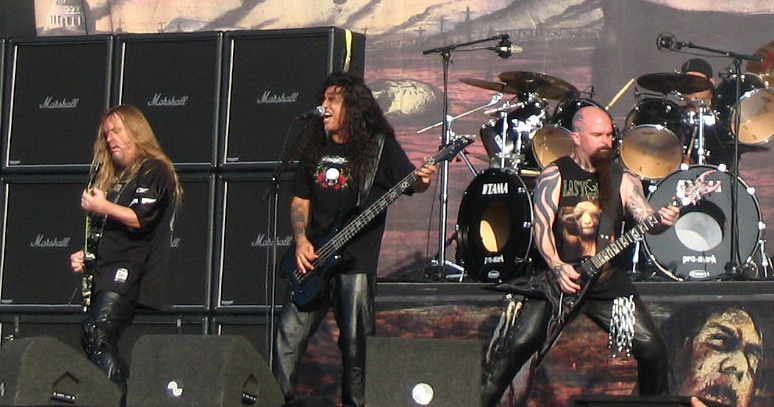
- Slayer's original lineup, performing at the Fields of Rock in 2007. From left to right: Jeff Hanneman, Tom Araya, Kerry King, and Dave Lombardo.

Background information
- Origin: Huntington Park, California, U.S.
- Genre: Thrash metal
- Works: Discography
- Years active: 1981–2019; 2024–present
- Labels: Metal Blade; Def Jam; American; Nuclear Blast
- Members: Kerry King; Tom Araya; Paul Bostaph; Gary Holt
- Past members: Jeff Hanneman; Dave Lombardo; Jon Dette
- Website: slayer.net

Slayer is an American thrash metal band from Huntington Park, California, formed in 1981 by guitarists Kerry King and Jeff Hanneman, drummer Dave Lombardo and vocalist/bassist Tom Araya. Slayer's fast and aggressive musical style made them one of the "big four" bands of thrash metal, alongside Metallica, Megadeth, and Anthrax. Slayer's current lineup comprises King, Araya, drummer Paul Bostaph, and guitarist Gary Holt, who initially joined as a touring musician in 2011 before joining the band permanently after Hanneman's death in 2013; the drummer Jon Dette is a former member of the band.

In the original lineup, King, Hanneman, and Araya contributed to the band's lyrics, and all of the band's music was written by King and Hanneman. The band's lyrics and album art, which cover topics such as serial killers, occultism, terrorism, religion, fascism, racism, and war, have generated album bans, delays, lawsuits and criticism from religious groups. However, its music has been highly influential, being cited by many bands as an influence musically, visually, and lyrically; the band's third album, Reign in Blood (1986), has been described as one of the heaviest and most influential thrash metal albums.

Slayer released twelve studio albums, three live albums, a box set, six music videos, two extended plays, and a cover album. Four of the band's studio albums have received gold certification in the United States; Slayer sold 5 million copies in the United States from 1991 to 2013, according to Nielsen SoundScan. The band has received five Grammy Award nominations, winning one in 2007 for the song "Eyes of the Insane" and one in 2008 for the song "Final Six", both of which were from the album Christ Illusion (2006). Slayer disbanded in 2019 following the conclusion of their global farewell tour, but has reformed to perform sporadic reunion shows since 2024.

== History ==
=== Early years (1981–1983) ===
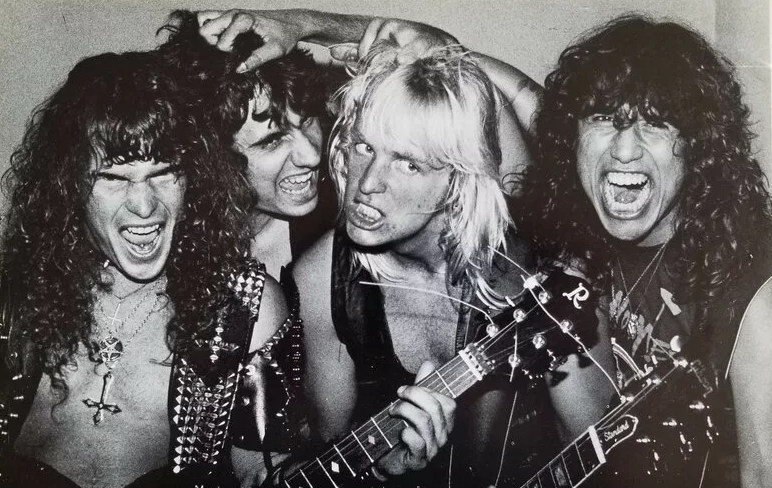
Slayer in December 1983. From left: Kerry King, Dave Lombardo, Jeff Hanneman, and Tom Araya.

Slayer was formed in 1981 by Jeff Hanneman, Dave Lombardo, Tom Araya and Kerry King in Huntington Park, California. The group started out playing covers of songs by bands such as Iron Maiden, Black Sabbath, Judas Priest and Venom at parties and clubs in Southern California. The band's early image relied heavily on Satanic themes that featured pentagrams, make-up, spikes, and inverted crosses. Rumors that the band was originally known as Dragonslayer, after the 1981 film of the same name, were denied by King, as he later stated: "We never were; it's a myth to this day." According to Lombardo, the original band name was to be Wings of Fire before they settled in with Slayer. According to him, he also designed the band logo. For inspiration, Lombardo thought in a perspective of a murderer of how they would carve out the logo with a knife and since he is lefthanded, the logo is unintentionally slanted to the right.

In 1983, Slayer was invited to open for the band Bitch at the Woodstock Club in Anaheim, California to perform eight songs, six of which were covers. The band was spotted by Brian Slagel, a former music journalist who had recently founded Metal Blade Records. Impressed with Slayer, he met with the band backstage and asked them to record an original song for his upcoming Metal Massacre III compilation album. The band agreed and their song "Aggressive Perfector" created an underground buzz upon its release in mid-1983, which led to Slagel offering the band a recording contract with Metal Blade.

Araya noted in a 1991 Metal Forces interview that the band had written original songs in its early days that "were more in the Scorpions and Iron Maiden vein", but they left those songs behind after rehearsing Aggressive Perfector extensively in preparation for the Metal Massacre album.

=== Show No Mercy, Haunting the Chapel, and Hell Awaits (1983–1986) ===
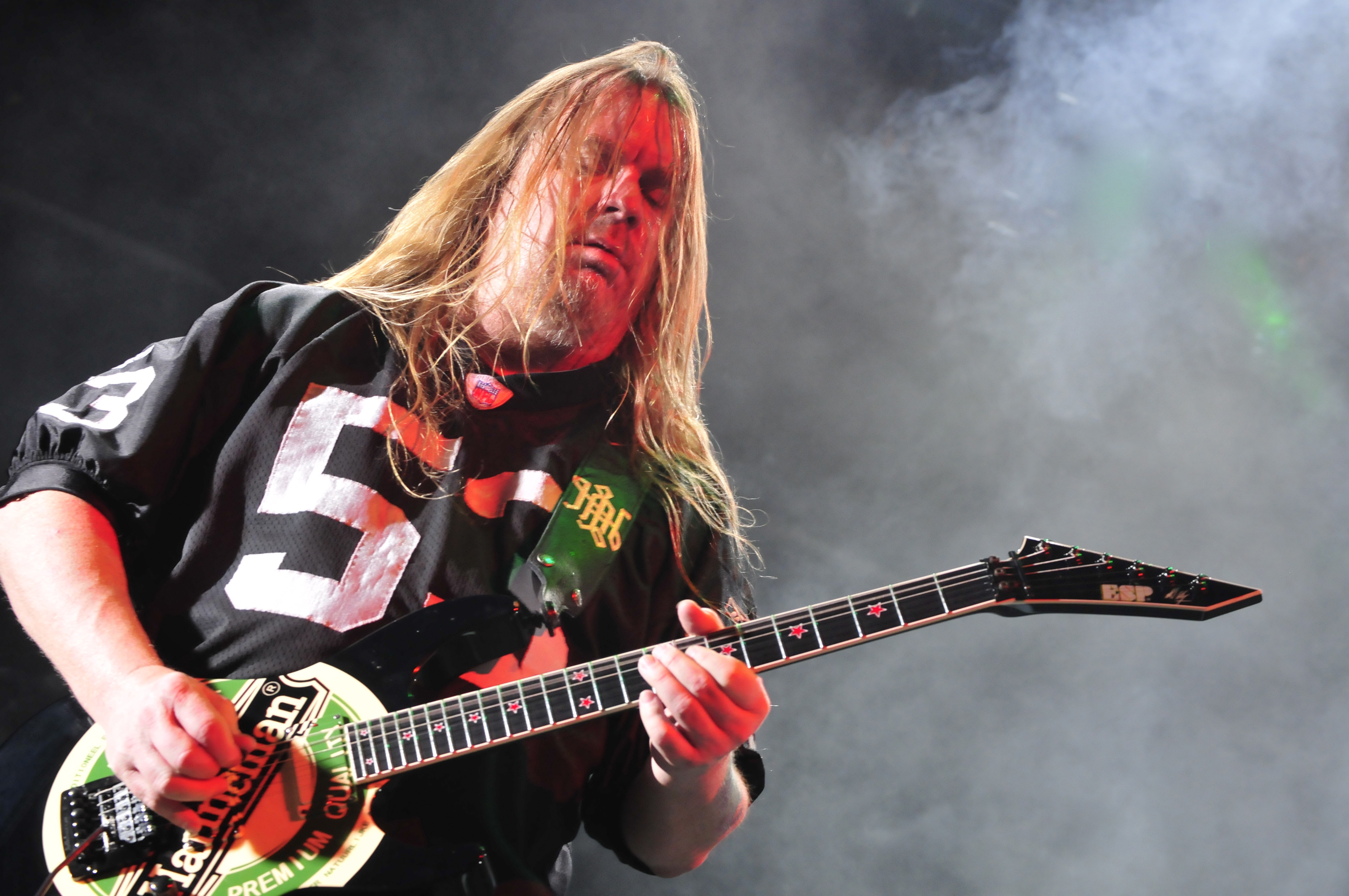
Jeff Hanneman was the guitarist of Slayer for 30 years, from 1981 to 2011. He was the main songwriter along with Kerry King, as well as a lyricist.

Without any recording budget, the band had to self-finance its debut album. Combining the savings of Araya, who was employed as a respiratory therapist, and money borrowed from King's father, the band entered the studio in November 1983. The album was rushed into release, stocking shelves three weeks after tracks were completed. Show No Mercy, released in December 1983 by Metal Blade Records, generated underground popularity for the band. The group began a club tour of California to promote the album. The tour gave the band additional popularity and sales of Show No Mercy eventually reached more than 20,000 in the US and another 20,000 worldwide.

In February 1984, King briefly joined Dave Mustaine's new band Megadeth. Hanneman was worried about King's decision, stating in an interview, "I guess we're gonna get a new guitar player." While Mustaine wanted King to stay on a permanent basis, King left after five shows, stating Mustaine's band was "taking too much of my time." The split caused a rift between King and Mustaine, which evolved into a long running feud between the two bands.

In June 1984, Slayer released a three-track EP called Haunting the Chapel. The EP featured a darker, more thrash-oriented style than Show No Mercy, and laid the groundwork for the future direction of the band. The opening track, "Chemical Warfare", has become a live staple, played at nearly every show since 1984. The EP sold 70,000 copies in its first eight months of release, according to Metal Blade founder Brian Slagel.

Later that year, Slayer began their first national club tour, traveling in Araya's Camaro towing a U-Haul trailer. The band recorded the live album Live Undead in November 1984 while in New York City.

"Hell Awaits" (1985)
"Hell Awaits" features a backwards recording of a demonic voice saying "join us" and "welcome back".

In March 1985, Slayer began a national tour with Venom and Exodus, resulting in their first live home video dubbed Combat Tour: The Ultimate Revenge. The video featured live footage filmed at the Studio 54 club. The band then made its live European debut at the Heavy Sound Festival in Belgium opening for UFO.

Show No Mercy had sold over 40,000 copies, which led to the band returning to the studio to record their second full-length album. Metal Blade financed a recording budget, which allowed the band to hire producer Ron Fair. Released in April 1985, Slayer's second full-length album, Hell Awaits, expanded on the darkness of Haunting the Chapel, with hell and Satan as common song subjects. The album was the band's most progressive offering, featuring longer and more complex song structures. The intro of the title track is a backwards recording of a demonic-sounding voice repeating "Join us", ending with "Welcome back" before the track begins. The album was a hit, with fans choosing Slayer for best band and live band, Hell Awaits as 1985's best album, and Dave Lombardo as best drummer in Metal Forces' 1985 Readers Poll.

=== Reign in Blood, Lombardo's brief hiatus, and South of Heaven (1986–1989) ===
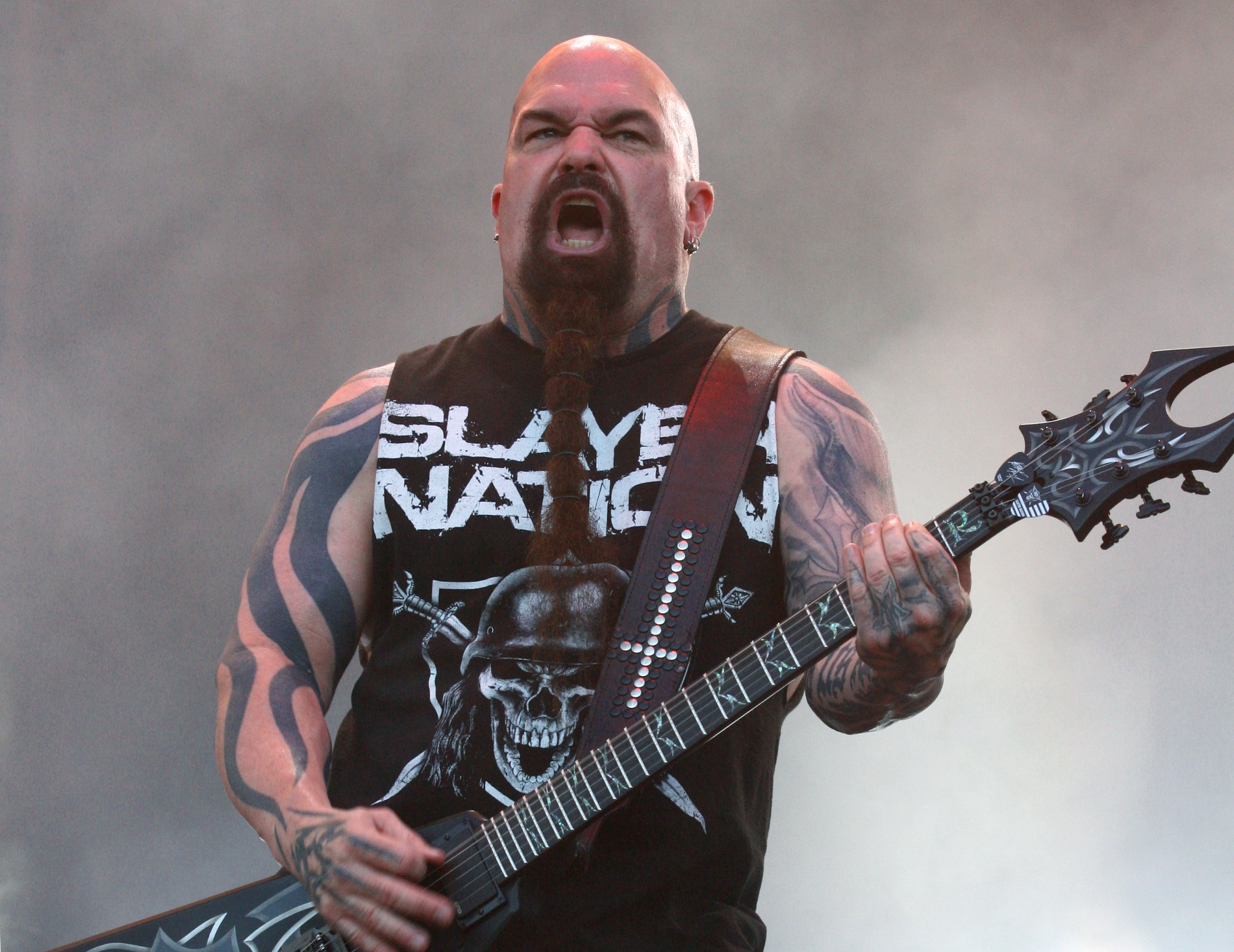
Guitarist Kerry King is one of the two constant members of Slayer.

Following the success of Hell Awaits, Slayer was offered a recording contract with Russell Simmons and Rick Rubin's newly founded Def Jam Records, then a largely hip-hop-based label. The band accepted, and with an experienced producer and major label recording budget, the band underwent a sonic makeover for their third album Reign in Blood, resulting in shorter, faster songs with clearer production. The complex arrangements and long songs featured on Hell Awaits were ditched in favor of stripped down, hardcore punk influenced song structures.

Def Jam's distributor, Columbia Records, refused to release the album due to the song "Angel of Death" which detailed Holocaust concentration camps and the human experiments conducted by Nazi physician Josef Mengele. The album was distributed by Geffen Records on October 7, 1986. However, due to the controversy, Reign in Blood did not appear on Geffen Records' release schedule. Although the album received virtually no radio airplay, it became the band's first to enter the Billboard 200, peaking at number 94, and the band's first album certified gold in the United States.

Slayer began touring in support of Reign in Blood in late 1986 with Overkill. The band was added as the opening act on W.A.S.P.'s US tour, but just one month into it, drummer Lombardo left the band: "I wasn't making any money. I figured if we were gonna be doing this professionally, on a major label, I wanted my rent and utilities paid." To continue with the tour, Slayer enlisted Tony Scaglione of Whiplash. However, Lombardo was convinced by his wife to return in 1987. At the insistence of Rubin, Slayer recorded a cover version of Iron Butterfly's "In-A-Gadda-Da-Vida" for the film Less than Zero. Although the band was not happy with the final product, Hanneman deeming it "a poor representation of Slayer" and King labeling it "a hunk of shit", it was one of their first songs to garner radio airplay.

In late 1987, Slayer returned to the studio to record their fourth studio album. To contrast the speed of Reign in Blood, the band consciously decided to slow down the tempos and incorporate more melodic singing. According to Hanneman, "We knew we couldn't top Reign in Blood, so we had to slow down. We knew whatever we did was gonna be compared to that album, and I remember we actually discussed slowing down. It was weird—we've never done that on an album, before or since."

Released in July 1988, South of Heaven received mixed responses from both fans and critics, although it was Slayer's most commercially successful release at the time, debuting at number 57 on the Billboard 200, and their second album to receive gold certification in the United States. Press response to the album was mixed, with AllMusic citing the album as "disturbing and powerful", and Kim Neely of Rolling Stone calling it "genuinely offensive satanic drivel". King said "that album was my most lackluster performance", although Araya called it a "late bloomer" which eventually grew on people. Touring for South of Heaven took place between August 1988 and January 1989, which included opening for Judas Priest on their Ram It Down tour and headlining a North American tour with Motörhead and Overkill.

=== Seasons in the Abyss and Lombardo's second departure (1990–1993) ===
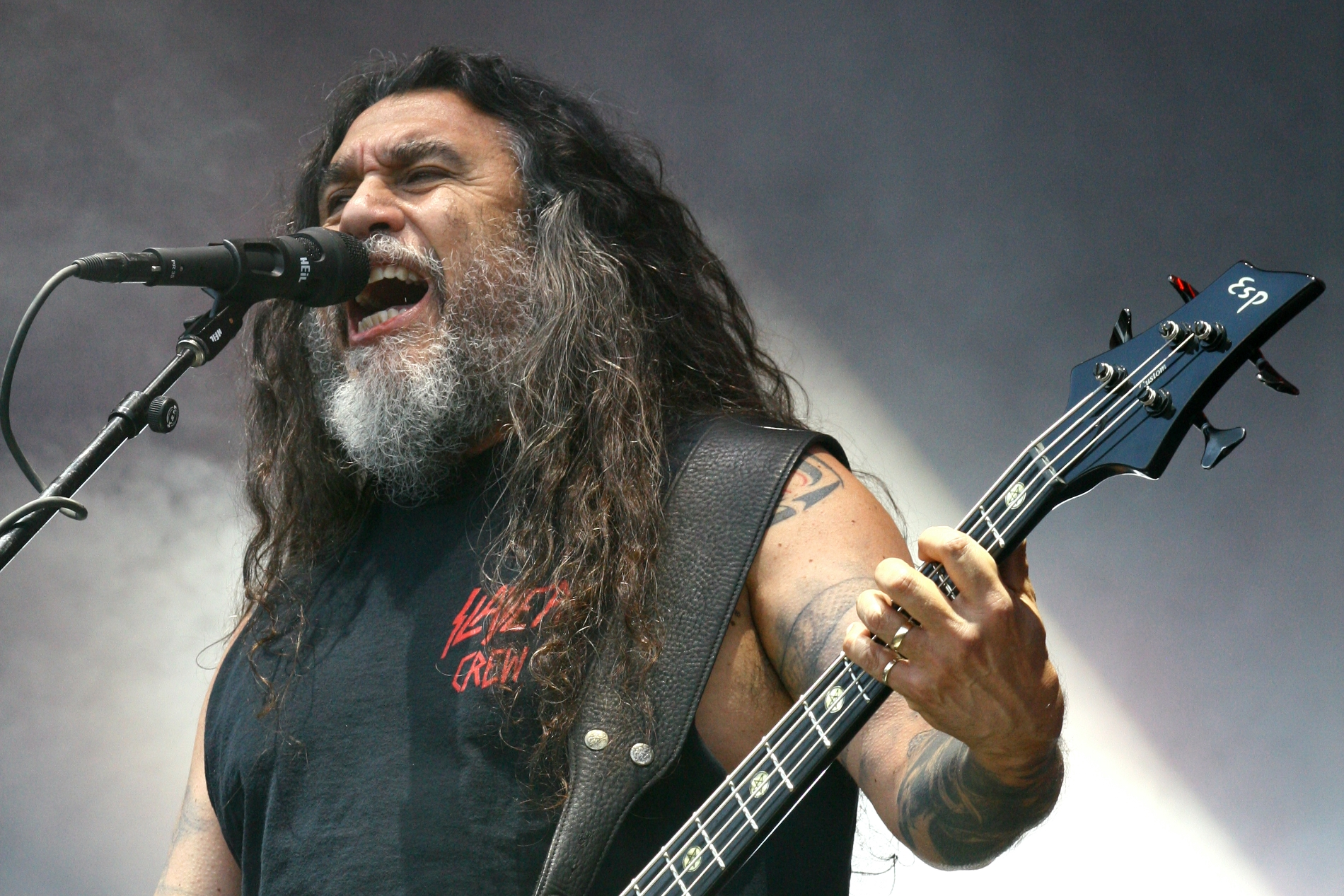
Bassist/vocalist Tom Araya is one of the two constant members of Slayer.

Slayer returned to the studio in early 1990 with co-producer Andy Wallace to record its fifth studio album. Following the backlash created by South of Heaven, Slayer returned to the "pounding speed of Reign in Blood, while retaining their newfound melodic sense." Seasons in the Abyss, released on October 9, 1990, was the first Slayer album to be released under Rubin's new Def American label, as he had parted ways with Def Jam owner Russell Simmons over creative differences. The album debuted at number No. 57 and peaked at No. 40 on the Billboard 200, and was certified gold in 1992. The album spawned Slayer's first music video for the album's title track, which was filmed in front of the Giza pyramids in Egypt. In support of Seasons in the Abyss, the band participated in the Clash of the Titans tour that was co-headlined by Megadeth; a European leg featured Testament and Suicidal Tendencies, while the North American trek had Anthrax and a then-unknown Alice in Chains as the direct support act. The band released a double live album, Decade of Aggression in 1991, to celebrate ten years since their formation. It debuted at number 55 on the Billboard 200.

In May 1992, Lombardo left the band due to conflicts with the other members, as well as his desire to be off tour for the birth of his first child. Lombardo formed his own band Grip Inc., with Voodoocult guitarist Waldemar Sorychta, and Slayer recruited former Forbidden drummer Paul Bostaph to fill in the drummer position. Slayer made its debut appearance with Bostaph at the 1992 Monsters of Rock festival at Castle Donington. Bostaph's first studio effort was a medley of three Exploited songs, "War", "UK '82", and "Disorder", with rapper Ice-T, for the Judgment Night movie soundtrack in 1993.

=== Divine Intervention, Undisputed Attitude, and Diabolus in Musica (1994–2000) ===
"SS-3" (1994)
"SS-3" is about Reinhard Heydrich, an architect of the Holocaust. SS-3 refers to the license plate number of the car in which he was killed.

On September 27, 1994, Slayer released Divine Intervention, the band's first album with Bostaph on the drums. The album featured songs about Reinhard Heydrich, an architect of the Holocaust, and Jeffrey Dahmer, an American serial killer and sex offender. Other themes included murder, the evils of church, and the lengths to which governments went to wield power. Araya's interest in serial killers inspired much of the content of the lyrics.

Slayer geared up for a world tour in 1995, with openers Biohazard and Machine Head. A video of concert footage, Live Intrusion, was released, featuring a joint cover of Venom's "Witching Hour" with Machine Head. Following the tour, Slayer was billed third at the 1995 Monsters of Rock festival, headlined by Metallica. In 1996, Undisputed Attitude, an album of punk covers, was released. The band covered songs by Minor Threat, T.S.O.L., Dirty Rotten Imbeciles, D.I., Verbal Abuse, Dr. Know, and The Stooges. The album featured three original tracks, "Gemini", "Can't Stand You", "DDAMM"; the latter two were written by Hanneman in 1984–1985 for a side project entitled Pap Smear. Bostaph left Slayer shortly after the album's recording to work on his own project, Truth About Seafood. With Bostaph's departure, Slayer recruited Testament drummer Jon Dette and headlined the 1996 Ozzfest alongside Ozzy Osbourne, Danzig, Biohazard, Sepultura, and Fear Factory. Dette was fired after a year due to a fallout with band members. After that, Bostaph returned to continue the tour.

Diabolus in Musica (Latin for "The Devil in Music") was released in 1998, and debuted at number 31 on the Billboard 200, selling over 46,000 copies in its first week. It was complete by September 1997, and scheduled to be released the following month, but got delayed by nine months after their label was taken over by Columbia Records. The album received a mixed critical reception, and was criticized for adopting characteristics of nu metal music such as tuned down guitars, murky chord structures, and churning beats. Blabbermouth.net reviewer Borivoj Krgin described the album as "a feeble attempt at incorporating updated elements into the group's sound, the presence of which elevated the band's efforts somewhat and offered hope that Slayer could refrain from endlessly rehashing their previous material for their future output", while Ben Ratliff of The New York Times had similar sentiments, writing on June 22, 1998, that: "Eight of the 11 songs on Diabolus in Musica, a few of which were played at the show, are in the same gray key, and the band's rhythmic ideas have a wearying sameness too."

The album was the band's first to primarily feature dropped tuning, making use of the tritone interval referred to in the Middle Ages as the Devil's interval. Slayer teamed up with digital hardcore group Atari Teenage Riot to record a song for the Spawn soundtrack titled "No Remorse (I Wanna Die)". The band paid tribute to Black Sabbath by recording a cover of "Hand of Doom" for the second of two tribute albums, titled Nativity in Black II. A world tour followed to support the new album, with Slayer making an appearance at the United Kingdom Ozzfest 1998.

=== God Hates Us All (2001–2005) ===
During mid-2001, the band joined Morbid Angel, Pantera, Skrape and Static-X on the Extreme Steel Tour of North America, which was Pantera's last major tour. After delays regarding remixing and artwork, including slip covers created to cover the original artwork as it was deemed "too graphic", Slayer's next album, God Hates Us All, was released on September 11, 2001. The band received its first Grammy nomination for the lead track "Disciple", although the Grammy was awarded to Tool for "Schism". The September 11 attacks on America jeopardized the 2001 European tour Tattoo the Planet, originally set to feature Pantera, Static-X, Cradle of Filth, Biohazard and Vision of Disorder. The dates in the United Kingdom were postponed due to flight restrictions, with a majority of bands deciding to withdraw, leaving Slayer and Cradle of Filth remaining for the European leg of the tour.

Pantera, Static-X, Vision of Disorder and Biohazard were replaced by other bands depending on location; Amorphis, In Flames, Moonspell, Children of Bodom, and Necrodeath. Biohazard eventually decided to rejoin the tour later on, and booked new gigs in the countries where they missed dates. Drummer Bostaph left Slayer before Christmas in 2001, due to a chronic elbow injury which would hinder his ability to play. Since the band's European tour was unfinished at that time, the band's manager, Rick Sales, contacted original drummer Dave Lombardo and asked if he would like to finish the remainder of the tour. Lombardo accepted the offer, and stayed as a permanent member.

Slayer toured playing Reign in Blood in its entirety throughout the fall of 2003, under the tour banner "Still Reigning". Their playing of the final song, "Raining Blood", culminated with the band drenched in a rain of stage blood. Live footage of this was recorded at the Augusta Civic Center in Augusta, Maine, on July 11, 2004, and released on the 2004 DVD Still Reigning. The band also released War at the Warfield and a box set, Soundtrack to the Apocalypse featuring rarities, live CD and DVD performances and various Slayer merchandise. From 2002 to 2004, the band performed over 250 tour dates, headlining major music festivals including H82k2, Summer tour, Ozzfest 2004 and a European tour with Slipknot. While preparing for the Download Festival in England, Metallica drummer Lars Ulrich was taken to a hospital with an unknown and mysterious illness, and was unable to perform. Metallica vocalist James Hetfield searched for volunteers at the last minute to replace Ulrich; Lombardo and Slipknot drummer Joey Jordison volunteered, with Lombardo performing the songs "Battery" and "The Four Horsemen".

=== Christ Illusion (2006–2008) ===
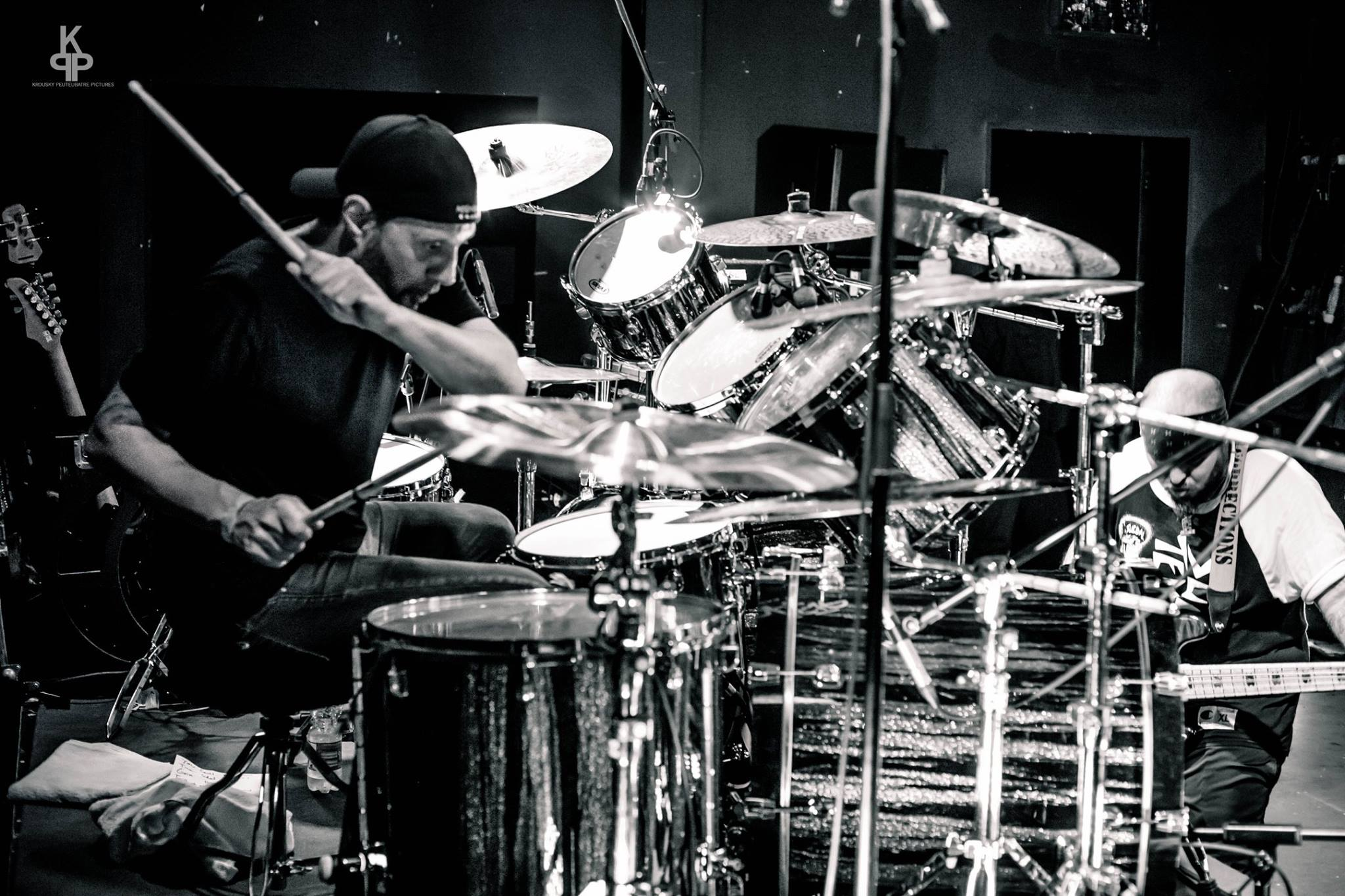
Original Slayer drummer Dave Lombardo rejoined the band in 2001 after a nine-year hiatus, and performed on the albums Christ Illusion (2006) and World Painted Blood (2009) before departing once again in 2013.

The next studio album, Christ Illusion, was originally scheduled for release on June 6, 2006, and would be the first album with original drummer Lombardo since 1990's Seasons in the Abyss. However, the band decided to delay the release of the record, as they did not want to be among the many, according to King, "half-ass, stupid fucking loser bands" releasing records on June 6, although USA Today reported the idea was thwarted because the band failed to secure sufficient studio recording time. Slayer released Eternal Pyre on June 6 as a limited-edition EP. Eternal Pyre featured the song "Cult", a live performance of "War Ensemble" in Germany and video footage of the band recording "Cult". Five thousand copies were released and sold exclusively through Hot Topic chain stores, selling out within hours of release. On June 30, Nuclear Blast Records released a 7" vinyl picture disc version limited to a thousand copies.

Christ Illusion was eventually released on August 8, 2006, and debuted at number 5 on the Billboard 200, selling over 62,000 copies in its first week. The album became Slayer's highest charting, improving on its previous highest-charting album, Divine Intervention, which had debuted at number 8. However, despite its high positioning, the album dropped to number 44 in the following week. Three weeks after the album's release, Slayer were inducted into the Kerrang! Hall of Fame for their influence to the heavy metal scene.

A worldwide tour dubbed The Unholy Alliance Tour was undertaken to support the new record. The tour was originally set to launch on June 6 in San Diego, but was postponed to June 10 as Araya had to undergo gall bladder surgery. In Flames, Mastodon, Children of Bodom, Lamb of God, and Thine Eyes Bleed (featuring Araya's brother, Johnny) and Ted Maul (London Hammersmith Apollo) were supporting Slayer. The tour made its way through America and Europe and the bands who participated, apart from Thine Eyes Bleed, reunited to perform at Japan's Loudpark Festival on October 15, 2006.

The video for the album's first single, "Eyes of the Insane", was released on October 30, 2006. The track was featured on the Saw III soundtrack, and won a Grammy Award for "Best Metal Performance" at the 49th Grammy Awards, although the band was unable to attend due to touring obligations. A week later, the band visited the 52nd Services Squadron located on the Spangdahlem U.S. Air Force Base in Germany to meet and play a show. This was the first visit ever to a military base for the band. The band made its first network TV appearance on the show Jimmy Kimmel Live! on January 19, playing the song "Eyes of the Insane", and four additional songs for fans after the show (although footage from "Jihad" was cut due to its controversial lyrical themes).

In 2007, Slayer toured Australia and New Zealand in April with Mastodon, and appeared at the Download Festival, Rock Am Ring, and a summer tour with Marilyn Manson and Bleeding Through.

=== World Painted Blood (2009–2011) ===
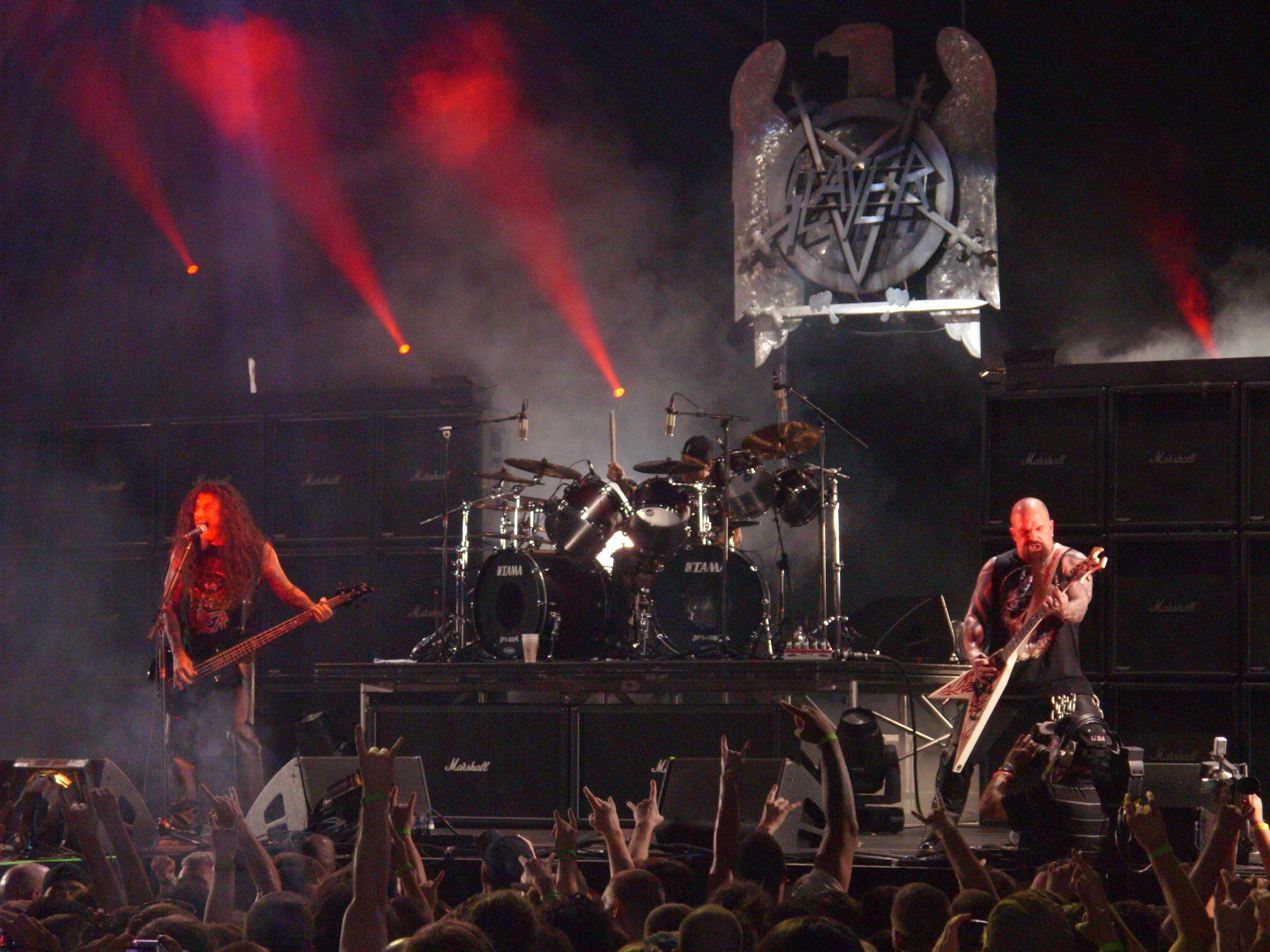
Slayer performing in 2009

In 2008, Araya expressed uncertainty about the future of the band, and that he could not see himself continuing the career at a later age. He said that once the band finished its upcoming album, which was the final record in their contract, the band would sit down and discuss its future. King was optimistic that the band would produce at least another two albums before considering to disband: "We're talking of going in the studio next February [2009] and getting the next record out so if we do things in a timely manner I don't see there's any reason why we can't have more than one album out." Slayer, along with Trivium, Mastodon, and Amon Amarth, teamed up for a European tour titled 'The Unholy Alliance: Chapter III', throughout October and November 2008. Slayer headlined the second Mayhem Festival in the summer of 2009. Slayer, along with Megadeth, also co-headlined Canadian Carnage, the first time they performed together in more than 15 years when they co-headlined four shows in Canada in late June 2009 with openers Machine Head and Suicide Silence.

The band's eleventh studio album, World Painted Blood, was released by American Recordings. It was available on November 3 in North America and November 2 for the rest of the world. The band stated that the album takes elements of all their previous works including Seasons in the Abyss, South of Heaven, and Reign in Blood. Slayer, along with Metallica, Megadeth, and Anthrax performed on the same bill for the first time on June 16, 2010, at Bemowo Airport, in Warsaw, Poland. One of the following Big 4 performances in (Sofia, Bulgaria, June 22, 2010) was sent via satellite in HD to cinemas. They also went on to play several other dates as part of the Sonisphere Festival. Megadeth and Slayer joined forces once again for the American Carnage Tour from July to October 2010 with opening acts Anthrax and Testament, as well as the European Carnage Tour in March and April 2011. The "Big Four" played more dates at Sonisphere in England and France for the first time ever. Slayer returned to Australia in February and March 2011 as part of the Soundwave Festival, and also played in California with the other members of the "Big Four".

In early 2011, Hanneman was diagnosed with necrotizing fasciitis. According to the band, doctors said that it likely originated from a spider bite. Araya said of Hanneman's condition: "Jeff was seriously ill. Jeff ended up contracting a bacteria that ate away his flesh on his arm, so they cut open his arm, from his wrist to his shoulder, and they did a skin graft on him, they cleaned up ... It was a flesh-eating virus, so he was really, really bad. So we'll wait for him to get better, and when he's a hundred percent, he's gonna come out and join us." The band decided to play their upcoming tour dates without Hanneman. Gary Holt of Exodus was announced as Hanneman's temporary replacement. Cannibal Corpse guitarist Pat O'Brien filled in for Holt during a tour in Europe. On April 23, 2011, at the American Big 4 show in Indio, California, Hanneman rejoined his bandmates to play the final two songs of their set, "South of Heaven" and "Angel of Death". This turned out to be Hanneman's final live performance with the band.

=== Hanneman's death, Lombardo's third split, and Repentless (2011–2016) ===
When asked if Slayer would make another album, Lombardo replied "Yes absolutely; although there's nothing written, there are definitely plans." However, Araya said Slayer would not begin writing a new album until Hanneman's condition improved. To celebrate the 25th anniversary of Reign In Blood, the band performed all of the album's tracks at the All Tomorrow's Parties festival at the Alexandra Palace in London.

In November 2011, Lombardo posted a tweet that the band had started to write new music. This presumably meant that Hanneman's condition improved, and it was believed he was ready to enter the studio. King had worked with Lombardo that year and they completed three songs. The band planned on entering the studio in either March or April 2012 and were hoping to have the album recorded before the group's US tour in late May and release it by the summer of that year. However, King said the upcoming album would not be finished until September and October of that year, making a 2013 release likely. In July 2012, King revealed two song titles for the upcoming album, "Chasing Death" and "Implode".

In February 2013, Lombardo was fired right before Slayer was to play at Australia's Soundwave festival due to an argument with band members over a pay dispute. Slayer and American Recordings released a statement, saying "Mr. Lombardo came to the band less than a week before their scheduled departure for Australia to present an entirely new set of terms for his engagement that were contrary to those that had been previously agreed upon", although Lombardo claimed there was a gag order in place. Dette returned to fill in for Lombardo for the Soundwave dates. It was confirmed that Lombardo was officially out of Slayer for the third time, and in May, Bostaph rejoined the band.

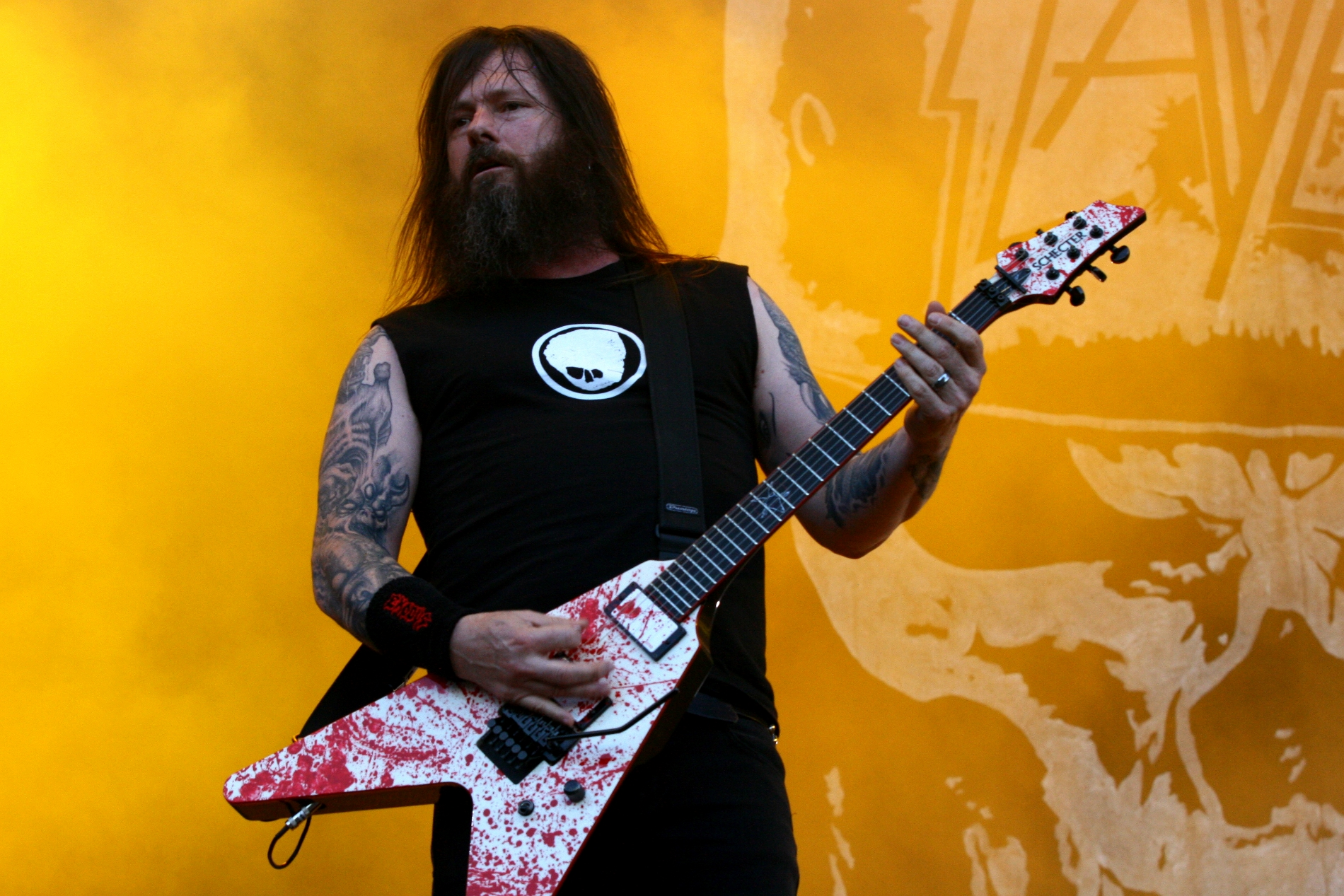
Exodus guitarist Gary Holt joined Slayer in 2011, originally as a touring member, and later became an official replacement for Jeff Hanneman, who died in 2013.

King said in February 2024 that he had severed ties with Lombardo ever since, adding that "he's dead to me."

On May 2, 2013, Hanneman died due to liver failure in a local hospital near his home in Southern California's Inland Empire; the cause of death was later determined to be alcohol-related cirrhosis. King confirmed that the band would continue, saying "Jeff is going to be in everybody's thoughts for a long time. It's unfortunate you can't keep unfortunate things from happening. But we're going to carry on – and he'll be there in spirit." However, Araya felt more uncertain about the band's future, expressing his belief that "After 30 years [with Hanneman active in the band], it would literally be like starting over", and doubting that Slayer's fanbase would approve such a change. Despite the uncertainty regarding the band's future, Slayer still worked on a followup to World Painted Blood. Additionally, it was reported that the new album would still feature material written by Hanneman.

At the 2014 Revolver's Golden Gods Awards ceremony, Slayer debuted "Implode", its first new song in five years. The group announced that they had signed with Nuclear Blast and planned to release a new album in 2015. It was reported that Holt would take over Hanneman's guitar duties full-time, although Holt did not participate in the songwriting. In February, Slayer announced a seventeen-date American tour to start in June featuring Suicidal Tendencies and Exodus. In 2015, Slayer headlined the Rockstar Energy Mayhem Festival for the second time. Repentless, the band's twelfth studio album, was released on September 11, 2015. Slayer toured for 2 1/2 years in support of Repentless. The band toured Europe with Anthrax and Kvelertak in October and November 2015, and embarked on three North American tours: one with Testament and Carcass in February and March 2016, then with Anthrax and Death Angel in September and October 2016, and with Lamb of God and Behemoth in July and August 2017. A lone date in Southeast Asia in 2017 was held in the Philippines.

=== Aborted thirteenth studio album, Final World Tour and split (2016–2019) ===
In August 2016, King was asked if Slayer would release a follow-up to Repentless. He replied, "We've got lots of leftover material from the last album, 'cause we wrote so much stuff, and we recorded a bunch of it too. If the lyrics don't change the song musically, those songs are done. So we are way ahead of the ballgame without even doing anything for the next record. And I've been working on stuff on my downtime. Like, I'll warm up and a riff will come to mind and I'll record it. I've gotten a handful of those on this run. So wheels are still turning. I haven't worked on anything lyrically yet except for what was done on the last record, so that's something I've gotta get on. But, yeah, Repentless isn't quite a year old yet." King also stated that Slayer was not expected to enter the studio until at least 2018. In an October interview on Hatebreed frontman Jamey Jasta's podcast, King stated that he was "completely open" to having guitarist Gary Holt (who had no songwriting contributions on Repentless) involved in the songwriting process of the next Slayer album. He explained, "I'm entirely open to having Gary work on something. I know he's gotta work on an Exodus record and I've got tons already for this one. But, you know, if he's gonna stick around... I didn't want it on the last one, and I knew that. I'm completely open to having that conversation. I haven't talked to Tom about it, I haven't talked to Gary open about it, but I'm open. That's not saying it is or isn't gonna happen. But my ears are open."

In a June 2017 interview with the Ultimate Guitar, Holt said that he was ready to contribute with the songwriting for the next album. When speaking to Revolver, King was asked if there were any plans in place for the band to begin working on the album, he said, "Funny thing is, Repentless isn't even two years old yet, though it seems like it is. But from that session, there are six or eight songs that are recorded—some with vocals, some with leads, but all with keeper guitar, drums and bass. So when those songs get finished lyrically, if the lyrics don't change the songs, they'll be ready to be on the next record. So we already have more than half a record complete, if those songs make it." He also gave conceivable consideration that it could be released next year, "I'm certainly not gonna promise it, because every time I do, I make a liar of myself! [Laughs]" When asked about any plans or the timeline the band would like to release the album, King said, "It depends on touring—getting time to rehearse, getting time to make up new stuff. We haven't even done Australia on this run yet at all. We're hitting Japan finally later this year. But if things go well, I'd like to record next year. But timelines change all the time." In an October 2017 interview, Holt once again expressed his desire to contribute to the songwriting for the next Slayer album, saying, "When that time comes and we are ready for the next album, if Kerry wants me to contribute, I've got riffs. I've got stuff right now that I've written that I am not using for Exodus, because it was kind of maybe just unintentional subconscious thing, like, 'It sounds a little too Slayer.'"

Plans for a new album were ultimately scrapped when on January 22, 2018, Slayer announced their farewell world tour through a video featuring a montage of press clippings, early posters and press photos spanning the band's entire career. Although the members of Slayer have never publicly explained why they were retiring, it was thought that one of the reasons behind this decision was Tom Araya's desire not to tour anymore and to spend more time with his family; Araya hinted at the possibility of retiring in a 2016 interview. This was confirmed by former drummer Dave Lombardo in a 2019 interview, who said: "Apparently, from what I hear. Tom has been wanting to retire when I was in the band—he wanted to stop. He had the neck issues. He's been wanting to retire for a long time now. So now that he's got it, I'm happy for him, and I hope he gets what he wants out of life and his future."

The farewell tour began with a North American trek in May and June 2018, supported by Lamb of God, Anthrax, Behemoth and Testament. The second leg of the North American tour took place in July and August, with Napalm Death replacing Behemoth, followed in November and December by a European tour with Lamb of God, Anthrax and Obituary. The farewell tour continued into 2019, with plans to visit places such as South America, Australia and Japan; in addition to European festivals such as Hellfest and Graspop. The band toured the United States in May 2019 with Lamb of God, Amon Amarth and Cannibal Corpse. Slayer also played one show in Mexico at Force Fest in October 2018.

On December 2, 2018, Holt announced that he would not perform the remainder of the band's European tour to be with his dying father. Vio-lence and former Machine Head guitarist Phil Demmel would fill in for him as a result.

Holt had stated that Slayer would not release a new album before the end of the farewell tour. On how long the tour would last, Holt's Exodus bandmate Steve "Zetro" Souza commented, "I'm speculating it's gonna take a year and a half or two years to do the one final thing, but I believe it's finished. Everybody knows what I know; just because I'm on the outside, I have no insight on that." The final North American leg of the tour, dubbed "The Last Campaign", took place in November 2019, and also included support from Primus, Ministry and Philip H. Anselmo & The Illegals. Despite being referred to as a farewell tour for Slayer, their manager Rick Sales has stated that "the band is not breaking up, they made a decision to stop touring. That doesn't mean the end of the band. It’s just the end of touring". Kristen Mulderig, who works with Rick Sales Entertainment Group, has also been quoted as saying that there would be Slayer-related activities following the tour's conclusion. However, within two days after the tour's completion, King's wife Ayesha stated on her Instagram page that there is "not a chance in hell" that Slayer would ever reunite to perform more shows or release new music.

=== Post-breakup (2020–2024) ===
In March 2020, when talking to Guitar World about his then-latest endorsement with Dean Guitars, King hinted that he would continue to make music outside of Slayer, simply saying, "Dean didn't sign me for nothing!" King stated in an August 2020 interview on the Dean Guitars YouTube channel that he had "more than two records' worth of music" for his yet-to-be disclosed new project. Bostaph later confirmed that he and King were working on a new project that would "sound like Slayer without it being Slayer—but not intentionally so." This project was later revealed to be King's solo debut album, From Hell I Rise, released on May 17, 2024, and the lineup of the album includes King, Bostaph, Death Angel vocalist Mark Osegueda, Hellyeah bassist Kyle Sanders, and former Vio-lence and Machine Head guitarist Phil Demmel.

In addition to King and Bostaph, most of the other members of Slayer have remained musically active. Holt continues to record and perform with Exodus, releasing a new album, Persona Non Grata, in 2021. Lombardo has been involved with various acts since his third split with Slayer in 2013, such as Suicidal Tendencies, Dead Cross, the Misfits, Mr. Bungle and Testament, the latter of which he had previously served as the drummer for the band's 1999 album The Gathering and rejoined in March 2022, only to leave again in the following April. Jon Dette has been a member of at least two bands, Animetal USA and Meshiaak, and performed with Anthrax and Volbeat as a fill-in drummer. Araya, aside from an appearance in the Bay Area thrash metal documentary film Murder in the Front Row, had not been publicly active in the music industry nor given any interviews between the conclusion of Slayer's final tour and the band's 2024 reunion.

The members of Slayer had expressed mixed opinions about a reunion. When asked by the Let There Be Talk podcast in June 2020 about the possibility of the band ever reforming, Holt stated, "If it does, if it ever happens, it has nothing to do with me. Someone else would call and say, 'We wanna [do this].' To my knowledge, it's done. And I think it should be that way. The band went out fucking on a bang, went out on Slayer's terms, and how many people get to say they did that?". Holt stated in March 2021 that he was open to a potential Slayer reunion, but it was unlikely to happen in the near future: "Look, if the powers that be ever—like, in a year or something—said, 'Hey, you know what? We feel like playing some shows,' I'm there to do it. But those aren't decisions for me to make, or even me to really speculate on. As far as my knowledge, the band is over, and the final show was November 30, 2019. And I'm full speed ahead with Exodus now." In October 2021, King expressed regret that Slayer had retired "too early." While congratulating Machine Head on their 30th anniversary as a band, he said, "Apparently, it's 30 years, which is quite an achievement. Not a lot of bands get there. We did, and then we quit too early. Fuck us. Fuck me. I hate fucking not playing." When interviewed two months later by Metal Hammer, King did not rule out the possibility of any more "Big Four" shows with Metallica, Megadeth and Anthrax, but expressed doubt that a Slayer reunion would ever happen: "The way that I'm moving forward is I don't think Slayer are ever going to play again. There's no business of me playing by myself!" King's wife Ayesha had also ruled out the possibility of a Slayer reunion, insisting that her husband and Araya would "never be Slayer again". In a February 2024 interview with Rolling Stone, King clarified that a reunion of the band was unlikely: "Could Slayer play a show again? I'm sure there's a scenario. Am I looking for it? No, I'm just getting ready to start my career. So if that happens, it happens. But I'm going to be doing this [solo band] for the next 10 years at least." King revealed in the same interview that he has not spoken to Araya since the band's split. King also says that his relationship with Araya is positive, but his relationship with that of former drummer Dave Lombardo is estranged, stating that Lombardo "was listening to this woman that was his attorney at the time, and she thought we had Metallica money, which we've never had fucking Metallica money. So she's just blowing shit in his ear, and he thinks he should be getting more than he should be getting."

=== Reunion (2024–present) ===
A few weeks after King said he did not foresee a Slayer reunion, the band announced on February 21, 2024 that they would play their first show since disbanding at Riot Fest on September 22, and play their second show five days later at Louder Than Life. However, due to weather conditions caused by Hurricane Helene, Louder Than Life canceled their September 27 shows, which included Slayer in the lineup. The lineup of this reunion was the 2013–2019 lineup of bassist/vocalist Tom Araya, guitarists Kerry King and Gary Holt and drummer Paul Bostaph. They also headlined the first of four nights of the Aftershock Festival in Sacramento on October 10, 2024, and while announcing this show, the band said in a statement, "There's been a lot of excited fans out there about our playing a couple of festival dates, so it's great to be able to add this last one."

In an interview with Metal Hammer, King indicated that the planned shows were a one-off and that the reunion was "not going to translate into recording and it's not going to translate into touring", clarifying that "it's three shows marking five years since our final shows, a fun, 'Hey, remember us from before the pandemic?' celebration." In a May 2024 interview on Trunk Nation with Eddie Trunk, King said that while he would not rule out more Slayer shows in the future, his solo career is his main priority now. When asked in an October 2024 interview with 107.7 The Bone if more reunion shows were in the works, Bostaph said, "We played our last one… If everybody's asking that question, I am too, but I don't have the answer to that question. So, yeah, Aftershock was the last one." That same month, it was announced that the band would be playing at the 2025 edition of Louder Than Life.

Slayer played its first shows in the UK in six years in July. In addition to two headlining shows there, the band appeared at Villa Park on July 5, 2025 as one of the supporting acts for Black Sabbath's final concert, dubbed "Back to the Beginning". Slayer also performed their first show in Canada in six years at the FEQ Music Festival in Quebec City on July 11, 2025. Two days after their appearance at the Louder Than Life festival, the band played a one-off headlining US show at the Hersheypark Stadium on September 20, with Knocked Loose, Suicidal Tendencies, Power Trip, Cavalera and Exodus as supporting acts.

When asked in July 2025 about the possibility of more shows under the Slayer name, Holt said: "I think it's a year-by-year thing, every year, and this is the second year we've done; it might be the last, you know? Fortunately, none of these shows have interfered with or conflicted with my Exodus schedule, so we'll see what happens. But it's been fun, playing with fire is always a blast. And last year, the shows we did, we were really good. We fucking rehearsed really hard, and we did not suck. And everybody had a great time. Everybody was happy. And so, you know, [we'll] see how it goes this year, and maybe next year, a couple other festivals." Holt also said that Slayer "is not like a permanent commitment on [his] end anymore", and added, "I'm able to focus on family number one, which is Exodus. [They're] my childhood friends. Slayer is my family as well, but they're family number two. And I've at my age, I want to close my career out with the guys I started it with."

Slayer played several shows in 2026, headlining the Rocklahoma festival in September and Sick New World Texas in Fort Worth the following month. Additional shows occurred in Minnesota along with two shows at the Kia Forum in Los Angeles (where the band played their final show before disbanding seven years earlier), to be followed by a Latin American tour in December with Power Trip and Kreator. Those dates saw them celebrate the 40th anniversary of their third album Reign in Blood. In an interview with Ultimate Guitar in April 2026, Holt stated that, while there are no plans to record new music or tour extensively, the band may play more shows in 2027: "We'll see. We have two this year, and maybe next year there'll be two more. Maybe there won't be, I don't know. It's one of those things that is like, each year comes by and then wait and see."

== Artistry ==
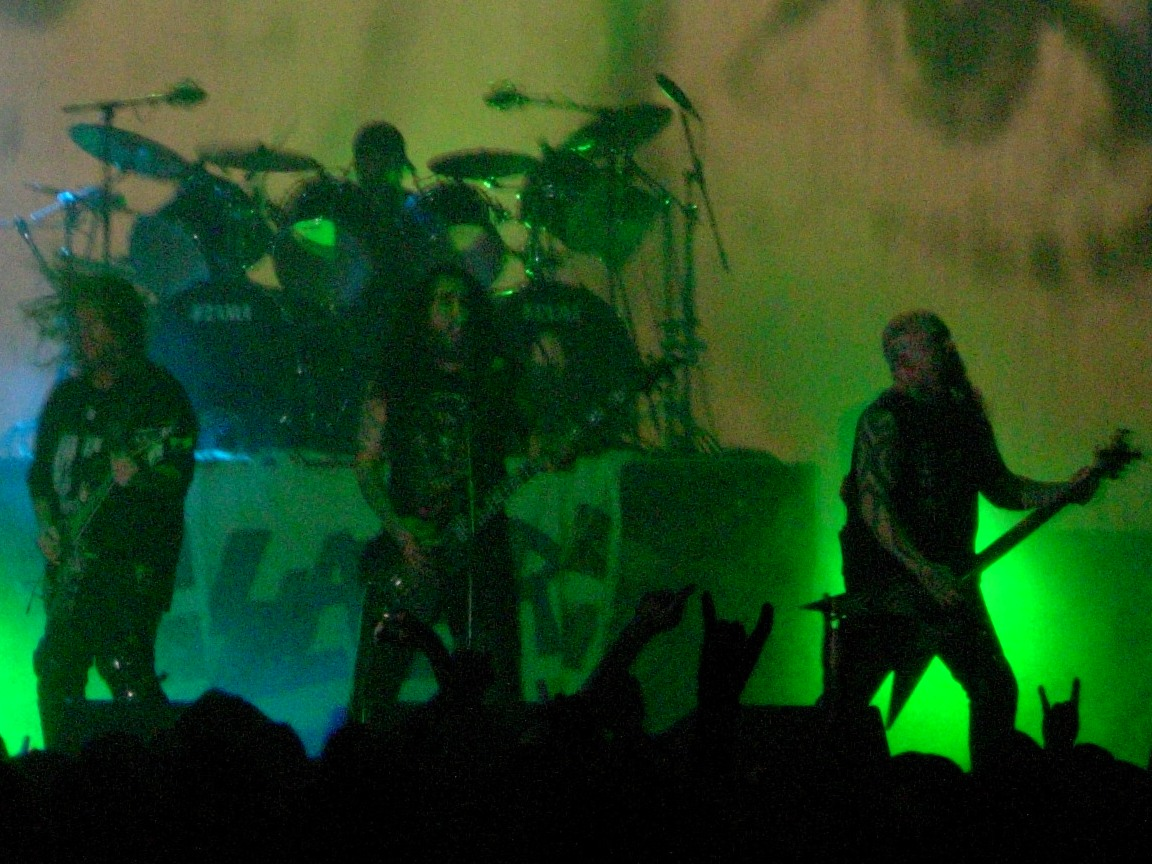
Hanneman, Araya and King were the main contributors for the band's lyrics.

Slayer is generally considered a thrash metal band. In an article from December 1986 by the Washington Post, writer Joe Brown described Slayer as speed metal, a genre he defined as "an unholy hybrid of punk rock thrash and heavy metal that attracts an almost all-male teen-age following". Brown wrote: "Over a jackhammer beat, Slayer's stun guitars created scraping sheets of corrosive metal noise, with occasional solos that sounded like squealing brakes, over which the singer-bassist emitted a larynx-lacerating growl-yowl." In an article from September 1988 by the New York Times, writer Jon Pareles also described Slayer as speed metal, additionally writing that the band "brings the sensational imagery of tabloids and horror movies" and has lyrics that "revel in death, gore and allusions to Satanism and Nazism." Pareles also described other "Big Four" thrash metal bands Metallica and Megadeth as speed metal bands. Slayer's early works were praised for their "breakneck speed and instrumental prowess", combining the structure of hardcore punk tempos and speed metal. The band released fast, aggressive material that was characterized as having a "primitive" sound. AllMusic noted God Hates Us All as "abandoning the extravagances and accessibility of their late-'80s/early-'90s work and returning to perfect the raw approach", with some fans labeling it as nu metal.

King and Hanneman's dual guitar solos have been referred to as "wildly chaotic" and "twisted genius". Invisible Oranges observed, "It’s fun to watch these guys live and see their virtually identical soloing styles. Jeff Hanneman, with atonal runs going up and down the neck, finished with a whammy bar dump! Kerry King, with atonal runs going up and down the neck, finished with a whammy bar dump! These guys were made to be in a band together – because they would sound terrible in any other band." Original drummer Lombardo would use two kick drums instead of a double pedal on a single drum. Lombardo's speed and aggression earned him the title of the "godfather of double bass" by Drummerworld. Lombardo stated his reasons for using two bass drums: "When you hit the bass drum, the head is still resonating. When you hit it in the same place right after that, you kinda get a 'slapback' from the bass drum head hitting the other pedal. You're not letting them breathe." When playing the two kick drums, Lombardo would use the "heel-up" technique.

In the original lineup, King, Hanneman, and Araya contributed to the band's lyrics, with King and Hanneman writing the music with additional arrangement from Lombardo and sometimes Araya. Araya formed a lyric writing partnership with Hanneman, which sometimes overshadowed the creative input of King. Hanneman stated that writing lyrics and music was a "free-for-all": "It's all just whoever comes up with what. Sometimes I'll be more on a roll and I'll have more stuff, same with Kerry – it's whoever's hot, really. Anybody can write anything; if it's good, we use it; if not, we don't."

When writing material, the band would write the music first before incorporating lyrics. King or Hanneman used a 24-track and drum machine to show band members the riff that they created and get their opinion. King, Hanneman or Lombardo would mention if any alterations could be made. The band would then add parts to get the basic song structure before figuring out where the lyrics and solos would be placed.

Slayer was influenced by hardcore punk bands such as Minor Threat, T.S.O.L., Dead Kennedys, Black Flag, Discharge, the Exploited, the Germs, D.R.I., Suicidal Tendencies and GBH. They were also influenced by heavy metal and hard rock acts such as Black Sabbath, Motörhead, Judas Priest, Iron Maiden, Led Zeppelin, Deep Purple, Kiss, UFO, AC/DC, Van Halen, Aerosmith, Ted Nugent, Rush, Alice Cooper, Rainbow, Venom, Mercyful Fate, Scorpions, Saxon, Accept, Angel Witch, and Raven. In addition, they were influenced by their contemporaries in the then-upcoming genre of thrash metal such as Metallica and Exodus, both of whom Slayer had discovered through tape trading before recording their debut album Show No Mercy.

== Legacy ==
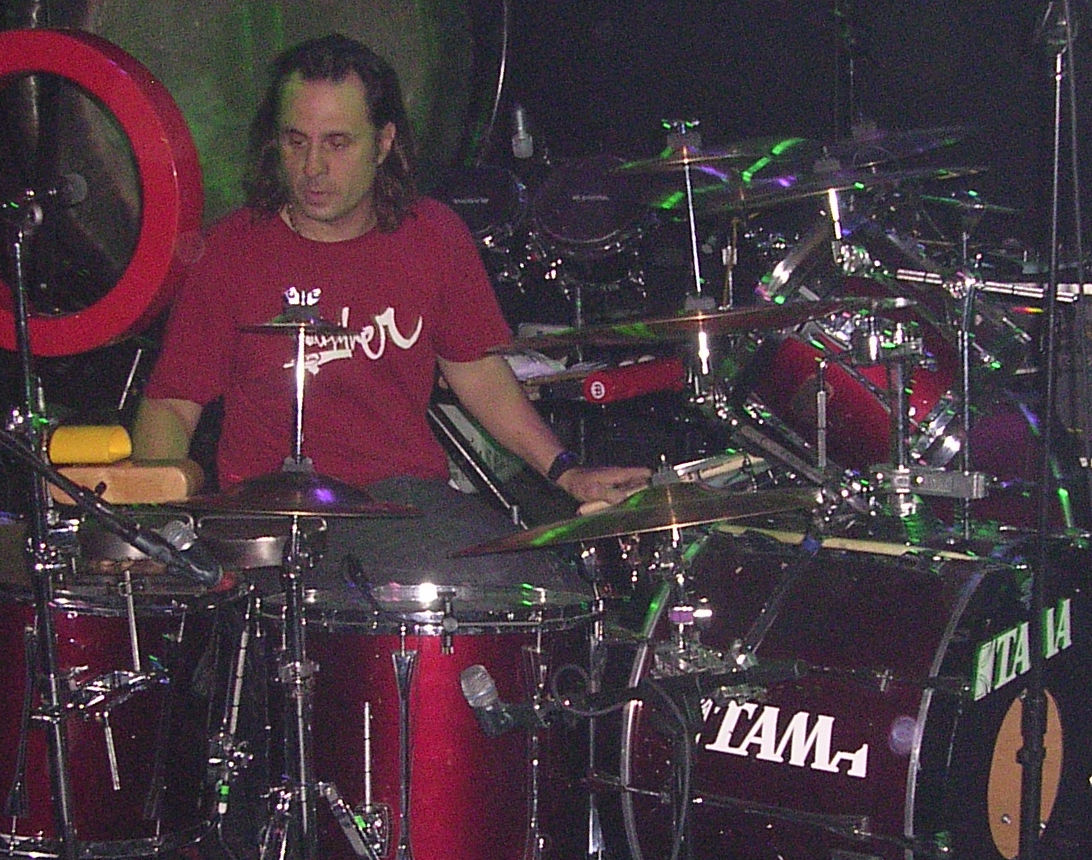
Lombardo's speed and aggression earned him the title of the "godfather of double bass" by Drummerworld.

Slayer is one of the most influential bands in heavy metal history. Steve Huey of AllMusic believes the musical style of Slayer makes the band stronger than the other members of the "Big Four" thrash metal bands Metallica, Megadeth, and Anthrax, all of which rose to fame during the 1980s. MTV stated that Slayer's "downtuned rhythms, infectious guitar licks, graphically violent lyrics and grisly artwork set the standard for dozens of emerging thrash bands" and their "music was directly responsible for the rise of death metal", ranking Slayer as the sixth greatest metal band of all time. VH1 ranked them 50th on their 100 Greatest Artists of Hard Rock list. Hanneman and King ranked number 10 in Guitar World's "100 greatest metal guitarists of all time" in 2004, and were voted "Best Guitarist/Guitar Team" in Revolver's reader's poll. Lombardo was also voted "Best Drummer", and the band entered the top five in the categories "Best Band Ever", "Best Live Band", "Album of the Year" (for Christ Illusion) and "Band of the Year".

Music author Joel McIver considers Slayer very influential in the extreme metal scene, especially in the development of the death metal and black metal subgenres. According to John Consterdine of Terrorizer, without "Slayer's influence, extreme metal as we know it wouldn't exist." Kam Lee of Massacre and formerly Death stated: "there wouldn't be death metal or black metal or even extreme metal (the likes of what it is today) if not for Slayer." Johan Reinholdz of Andromeda said that Slayer "were crucial in the development of thrash metal which then became the foundation for a lot of different subgenres. They inspired generations of metal bands." Alex Skolnick of Testament declared: "Before Slayer, metal had never had such razor-sharp articulation, tightness, and balance between sound and stops. This all-out sonic assault was about the shock, the screams, the drums, and [...] most importantly the riffs." Steve Asheim, drummer for Deicide, declared that "there obviously would not have been a Deicide as we know it without the existence of Slayer." Sepultura guitarist Andreas Kisser affirmed that "without Slayer, Sepultura would never be possible."

In particular, the band's 1986 release Reign in Blood has been an influence to extreme and thrash metal bands since its release and is considered the record which set the bar for death metal. It had a significant influence on genre leaders such as Death, Obituary, Cannibal Corpse, Morbid Angel and Napalm Death. The album was hailed the "heaviest album of all time" by Kerrang!, a "genre-definer" by Stylus, and a "stone-cold classic upon its release" by AllMusic. In 2006, Reign in Blood was named the best metal album of the last 20 years by Metal Hammer. Writing on the bands impact Revolver noted that "every metal anything black-, death-, grind and otherwise brutal, offensive and nasty that has come since owes an eternal debt of gratitude" to Slayer. According to Nielsen SoundScan, Slayer sold 4,900,000 copies in the United States from 1991 to 2013. In 2016, the staff of Loudwire named them the fifth best metal band of all time.

Other groups who cited Slayer among their major influences include Pantera, Testament, Kreator, Body Count, Children of Bodom, Mayhem, Darkthrone, Avenged Sevenfold, Bullet for My Valentine, Trivium, As I Lay Dying, All That Remains, System of a Down, Killswitch Engage, Slipknot, Parkway Drive, Machine Head, DevilDriver, Hatebreed, Lamb of God, Gojira, Behemoth, August Burns Red, Evile Whitechapel, Lacuna Coil, Unearth, Dope, and Taproot. Dave Grohl recalled "Me and my friends, we just wanted to listen to fucking Slayer and take acid and smash stuff."

In 2019, Paul Brannigan of Kerrang! wrote "Beyond their status as genre pioneers, across a four-decade career the LA quartet have come to embody uncompromised, unapologetic attitude, their catalogue wholly untainted by either industry expectations or commercial success." Longtime collaborator Rick Rubin, added that Slayer belonged to a certain group of unique artists who "follow their truth out of time, with no influence of anything else going."

== Controversies ==
A lawsuit was brought against the band in 1995 by the parents of Elyse Pahler, who accused the band of encouraging their daughter's murderers through their lyrics. Pahler was drugged, strangled, stabbed, trampled on, and raped as a sacrifice to the devil by three fans of the band. The case was unsealed by the court on May 19, 2000, stating Slayer and related business markets distribute harmful products to teens, encouraging violent acts through their lyrics, and "none of the vicious crimes committed against Elyse Marie Pahler would have occurred without the intentional marketing strategy of the death-metal band Slayer". The lawsuit was dismissed in 2001, for multiple reasons including "principles of free speech, lack of a duty and lack of foreseeability". A second lawsuit was filed by the parents, an amended complaint for damages against Slayer, their label, and other industry and label entities. The lawsuit was again dismissed. Judge E. Jeffrey Burke stated, "I do not consider Slayer's music obscene, indecent or harmful to minors."

Slayer has been accused of holding Nazi sympathies due to the band's eagle logo bearing resemblance to the Eagle atop swastika and the lyrics of "Angel of Death". "Angel of Death" was inspired by the acts of Josef Mengele, the doctor who conducted human experiments on prisoners during World War II at the Auschwitz concentration camp and was dubbed the "Angel of Death" by inmates. Araya credits Rubin with coming up with the eagle logo from Hanneman's book on Nazi war medals, with the band using it since Seasons in the Abyss. The band has dismissed these accusations as misinterpretations of their intentions.

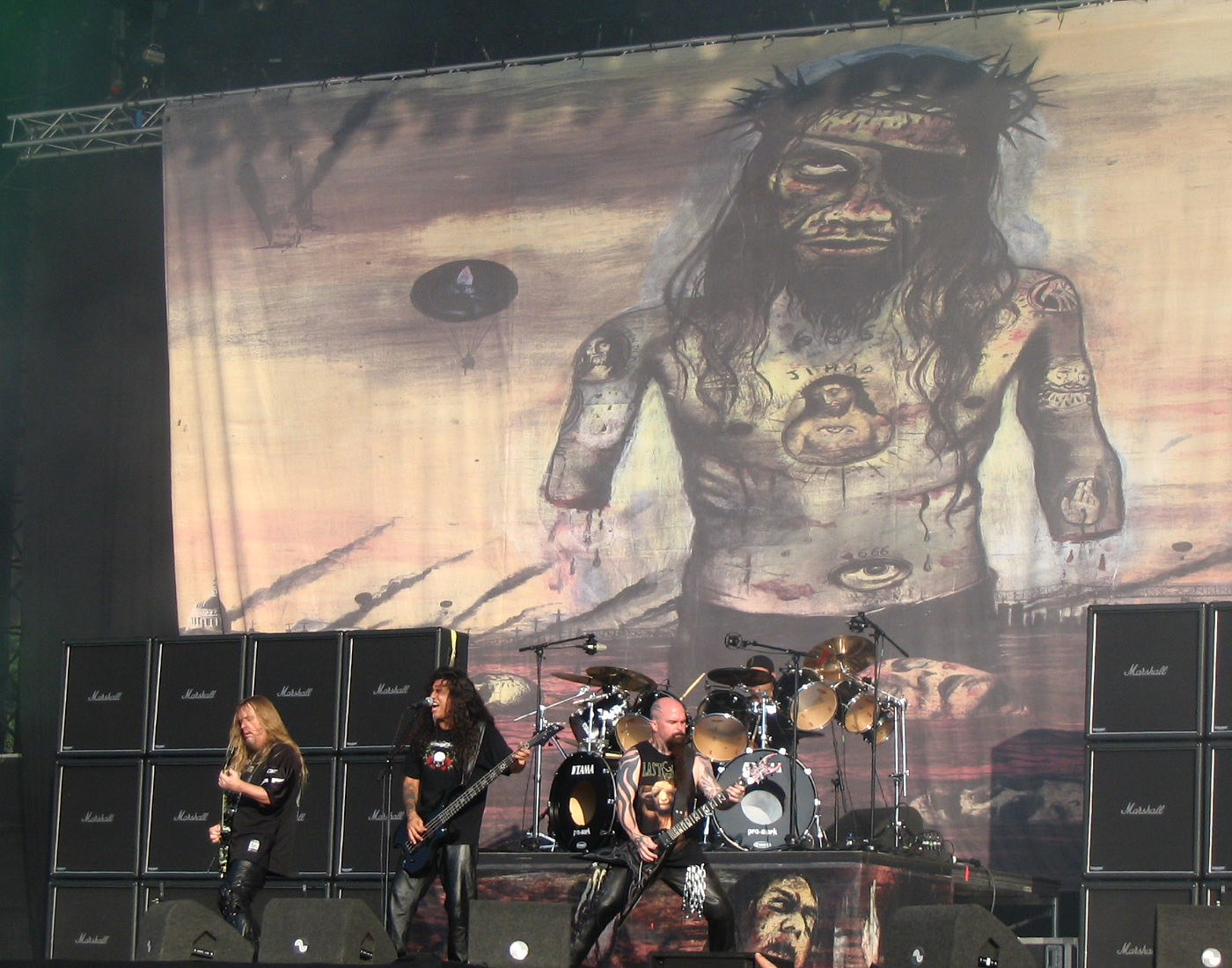
Due to its controversial artwork (pictured in background), all Indian stocks of Christ Illusion were recalled and destroyed.

Slayer's cover of Minor Threat's "Guilty of Being White" raised questions about a possible message of white supremacy in the band's music. The controversy surrounding the cover involved the changing of the refrain "guilty of being white" to "guilty of being right", at the song's ending. This incensed Minor Threat frontman Ian MacKaye, who stated "that is so offensive to me". King said it was changed for "tongue-in-cheek" humor as he thought the allegation of racism at the time was "ridiculous".

In a 2004 interview, when asked, "Did critics realize you were wallowing in parody?", Araya replied "No. People thought we were serious!...back then you had that PMRC, who literally took everything to heart, when in actuality you're trying to create an image. You're trying to scare people on purpose." Araya also denied rumors that the band's members are Satanists, stating that they find the subject of Satanism interesting and that "we are all on this planet to learn and experience".

The song "Jihad" from Christ Illusion sparked controversy among families of the September 11 attack victims, as it deals with the attack from the perspective of one of the religious terrorists. King stated "In America every band under the sun has written their 9/11 song. And that's why I didn't want to have any part of it, but this is really cool. It kind of has an 'Angel Of Death' feel because it doesn't condemn anyone or say that anyone's right or wrong." Seventeen bus benches promoting the album in Fullerton, California were deemed offensive by city officials, who contacted the band's record label and had the ads removed.

In India, Christ Illusion was recalled by EMI India after protests from Christian religious groups due to the graphic nature of the artwork. The album cover was designed by Slayer's longtime collaborator Larry Carroll and features Christ in a "sea of despair", with amputated arms, missing an eye, while standing in a sea of blood with severed heads. Joseph Dias of the Mumbai Christian group Catholic Secular Forum took "strong exception" to the original album artwork as well as the lyrics of "Skeleton Christ" and "Jihad", issuing a memorandum to Mumbai's police commissioner in protest. On October 11, 2006, EMI announced that all stocks had been destroyed, noting it had no plans to re-release the record in India in the future.

== Band members ==
Current

- Tom Araya – lead vocals, bass (1981–2019, 2024–present)
- Kerry King – guitar (1981–2019, 2024–present), backing vocals (1981–1983)
- Gary Holt – guitar (2013–2019, 2024–present; touring musician 2011–2013)
- Paul Bostaph – drums (1992–1996, 1997–2001, 2013–2019, 2024–present)

Former

- Jeff Hanneman – guitar (1981–2013; died 2013), (Note: From late 2010 until his death in May 2013, Jeff Hanneman's participation in Slayer was minimal. In January 2011, he contracted necrotizing fasciitis, which severely restricted his ability to perform. He appeared publicly with the band on only one known occasion, playing two songs during an encore at one of Slayer's Big 4 performances in April 2011; he also attended rehearsals for Fun Fun Fun Fest in November 2011, but did not end up performing at this show. By July 2012, Hanneman had not written or recorded any new material for the band's follow up to 2009's World Painted Blood. In February 2013, Kerry King stated he was planning on recording all of the guitar parts for the upcoming album himself, but was open to Hanneman's return if he was willing and able. King also denied that Gary Holt, member of Exodus and Hanneman's live fill-in, would write or record anything for the upcoming album. Hanneman died on May 2, 2013 at the age of 49 due to liver failure.) backing vocals (1981–1983)
- Dave Lombardo – drums (1981–1986, 1987–1992, 2001–2013)
- Jon Dette – drums (1996–1997; touring musician 2013)

Touring

- Pat O'Brien – guitar (2011)
- Phil Demmel – guitar (2018)
- Bob Gourley – drums (1983)
- Tony Scaglione – drums (1986–1987)

== Discography ==
Studio albums

- Show No Mercy (1983)
- Hell Awaits (1985)
- Reign in Blood (1986)
- South of Heaven (1988)
- Seasons in the Abyss (1990)
- Divine Intervention (1994)
- Undisputed Attitude (1996)
- Diabolus in Musica (1998)
- God Hates Us All (2001)
- Christ Illusion (2006)
- World Painted Blood (2009)
- Repentless (2015)
