= God Hates Us All =

Studio album by Slayer
- Released: September 11, 2001
- Studios: The Warehouse, Vancouver
- Genres: Thrash metal; groove metal; nu metal
- Length: 42:14
- Label: American
- Producer: Matt Hyde

Slayer chronology
Diabolus in Musica (1998)	God Hates Us All (2001)	Soundtrack to the Apocalypse (2003)

Alternative cover
- For the album to be sold in more retail outlets, an alternative slipcase cover was created.

God Hates Us All is the ninth studio album by American thrash metal band Slayer, released on September 11, 2001, by American Recordings. It was recorded over three months at The Warehouse Studio in Vancouver, and includes the Grammy Award-nominated song "Disciple". Guitarist Kerry King wrote the majority of its lyrics, taking a different approach from earlier recordings by exploring topics such as religion, murder, revenge, and self-control. Stylistically, the album continues the experimentation with the nu metal sound the band adopted on Diabolus in Musica. It was Slayer's last album to feature drummer Paul Bostaph until his return on their 2015 album Repentless.

The album's release was delayed due to its explicit cover artwork, which led to alternative slip covers in some retail outlets, difficulties during mixing, and a change of distributor for the band's label. Despite this, God Hates Us All received positive reviews from critics and peaked at number 28 on the Billboard 200. By 2009, it had sold over 319,000 copies in the United States.

== Recording ==
Slayer began writing lyrics for a new album prior to their appearance at the 1999 Ozzfest. However, every three to four months the band was distracted by commitments to Ozzfest, and worldwide "Tattoo the Earth" tour with Slipknot. Guitarist Jeff Hanneman later admitted "that was the last break. Then we got our shit together." The band's longtime producer, Rick Rubin, was too busy to work with Slayer, and felt "burned out"—unable to create intense music. Araya and King had similar feelings about Rubin, and King remarked he "wanted to work with someone into the heavy-music scene, and Rubin's not anymore. I wanted somebody who knows what's hot, knows what's selling, knows the new techniques, and will keep me on my toes." Rubin recommended two producers although the first producer was not going to work out personality-wise with Hanneman. The band was pleased with producer candidate Matt Hyde's work on "Bloodline" and hired him to produce the entire album.

God Hates Us All was to be recorded in a Hollywood studio; however, the band relocated to Vancouver, British Columbia due to the availability of cheaper studio time. Hyde recommended a studio to the band—The Warehouse Studio (owned by Bryan Adams) as he had previously worked there. The studio was altered to make it "feel like home" for Slayer. This consisted of adding incense burners, candles, dimmed lights and pornography on the walls. Two banner flags of two middle fingers were also hung up. Vocalist Tom Araya says: "that was basically the attitude of Slayer in the studio. We had a red devil head on one of the speakers. We had a skull on another. That's the kind of shit we put up--spooky stuff that makes you feel at home."

Hyde used the digital audio workstation Pro Tools during the engineering, production, and audio mixing stages of the album. Slayer wanted to keep the use of computer effects to a minimum—only to include a small amount of delay and distortion. As with previous recordings, the drum tracks were recorded first. Drummer Paul Bostaph follows a simple rule suggested by Rubin when in the studio: "The perfect take is the one that felt like it was going to fall apart but never did." Seven-string guitars were used on the tracks "Scarstruck" and "Here Comes the Pain," the first time Slayer had done so. Guitarist King decided to borrow a seven-string guitar from the B.C. Rich guitar company (manufacturer of his signature model, the KKV.) After writing one song King ordered a seven string with the thought that: "there's no point having one tuning for just one song." So he wrote another, going on to comment: "you don't have to be good to make up a seven-string riff."

The album features two songs on seven string guitars, four songs with guitars tuned to Drop-B and all other songs in C# Standard.

== Lyrical themes ==
God Hates Us All explores themes such as religion, murder, revenge, and self-control. King wrote a majority of the lyrics, which he based on "street" subjects which everyone could relate to, rather than "Satan this," "Satan that," and "the usual Dungeons & Dragons shit" from the band's previous records. King told Guitar World:

I definitely wanted to put more realism in it, more depth. God Hates Us All isn't an anti-Christian line as much as it's an idea I think a lot of people can relate to on a daily basis. One day you're living your life, and then you're hit by a car or your dog dies, so you feel like, "God really hates me today."

The song "Threshold" is about reaching one's limit with a person in a situation where one is about to break—and are about to blow up as they get "under your skin", while "Cast Down" features a fallen angel who falls into drugs. "God Send Death" and "Deviance" take up the idea of killing people for pleasure. Both songs were written by Hanneman. Having read several books on serial killers, Hanneman came to the conclusion he could only kill someone if they really "pissed him off", and decided he was unable to kill someone he did not know just for power. He later admitted he was trying to get into that person's mind; "why do they get off on it? Without being angry, just killing for the sake of killing and getting off on it. I just wanted to get into that mindset."

While other members went to local pubs, Araya spent his free hours reading books about serial killers such Gordon Burn's Happy Like Murderers: The Story of Fred and Rosemary West. Araya was seeking inspiration and aimed at sounding convincing while singing the lyrics and avoiding sounding gimmicky. Araya sang the lyrics more "over-the-top" than done on previous albums, as King's writing style is more "aggro." This resulted in Kerrang! reviewer Jason Arnopp describing the album's lyrics as "so packed with foul and abusive language that it sounds as if D-12 and the Sopranos family were going head-to-head in a Celebrity Swearathon."

== Album title and cover art ==
God Hates Us All was originally intended to be named Soundtrack to the Apocalypse, but Araya suggested that the title would be better used for a box set, which the band later released in 2003. The phrase God Hates Us All originates from the song "Disciple", during which the line is repeated over the chorus. The lyrics are in reference to God's allowance of acts such as suicide and terrorism while seemingly doing nothing to prevent them. A member of the heavy metal band Pantera suggested using "God Hates Us All" for a shirt design after King played the song for the band. King agreed although he thought the phrase would have more impact as the album title.

The original album cover depicts a Bible spiked with nails placed in a pentagram star shape covered in blood with the word "Slayer" burnt across it. The liner notes intersperse the lyrics between passages from the biblical Book of Job, partly crossed out with a black marker. The idea was suggested by the band's record company, although King wanted more time to develop a better cover. King's concept for the cover was to show nails in the shape of a pentagram and have them miss keywords in Bible verses so it appeared as if it had been created by a sociopath. He later complained that the outcome was: "typical of a record company with absolutely no idea what the fuck they were going to do", and said that the cover "looked like a seventh grader defaced the Bible." A slip insert was placed in front of the covers in major retail outlets.

== Reception ==
Professional ratings
Aggregate scores
Source	Rating
Metacritic	80/100
Review scores
Source	Rating
AllMusic	3.5/5 stars
Alternative Press	4.5/5 stars
Blender	3/5 stars
Entertainment Weekly	B+
Drowned in Sound	10/10
Los Angeles Times	3/4 stars
Q	4/5 stars
Rolling Stone	3.5/5 stars
Rock Hard	8/10
Spin	8/10

God Hates Us All was set for release on July 10. However, concerns regarding audio mixing, the album cover, and the band's label (American Recordings) changing distributor, caused the release date to be delayed until September 11, 2001.

With the title and the day it was released (not postponed), the album drew a connection to the September 11 attacks, which was the second time Slayer inadvertently caused controversy towards one of their releases: previously the release of Seasons in the Abyss—containing the song "War Ensemble"—had coincided with the Gulf War. In its week of release, God Hates Us All debuted at number 28 on the Billboard 200, and sold 51,000 copies. It entered the Canadian Albums Chart at number 9 and debuted at number 18 on the top Internet album chart.

As of November 11, 2009, the album has sold 319,000 copies in the United States.

God Hates Us All received generally positive reviews from music critics. On Metacritic, the album has a score of 80 out of 100 based on 12 reviews. Kerrang!'s Jason Arnopp described the album as: "easily Slayer's most convincing collection since Seasons in the Abyss," awarding the album five out of five. Rolling Stone's Rob Kemp wrote the record was "Slayer's most brutal record since 1986's immortal (or undead) Reign in Blood," describing the music as "galloping double bass-drum salvos which switch on a dime to furious double-time pummeling as ominous power chords and jagged shred solos slice and dice with Formula One precision." Kemp awarded the album three and a half out of five. AllMusic reviewer Jason Birchmeier commented: "nearly 20 years into their evolution, Slayer have abandoned the extravagancies and accessibility of their late-'80s/early-'90s work and returned to perfect the raw approach of their early years. A near flawless album," and that Araya's performance possibly makes "the most exhausting Slayer album yet."

Not all critics were impressed with the album. Blabbermouth.net reviewer Borivoj Krgin dismissively labeled the album as "another failure on the band's part to take the initiative and reinvent themselves." Krgin described King as "the weaker and less inventive of the two main songwriters" feeling the album "follows a familiar direction that almost always sounds tired and forced." Krgin also singled out Araya for criticism and called the vocalist: "a hollow shell of his former self, boasting a singing style that is monotonous, devoid of creativity and at times virtually unlistenable." Krgin awarded the record 6 out of 10, and ended the review by observing that: "Slayer's rapidly diminishing record sales is a sign that the band is in dire need of a new lease on life." The Washington Post gave it a mixed review, stating: "Of course, what Slayer says isn't supposed to be nearly as important as how it says it. The riffs are all overdriven and suffocating and that's a conscious decision. In its simplest form, a song like "Exile" could pass for Motorhead pushed through the blades of a lawn mower but that's selling Slayer short. Guitarist Kerry King actively fights the groove that naturally comes from playing heavy rock-and-roll."

The song "Disciple" received a Grammy Award nomination for "Best Metal Performance" at the 44th Grammy Awards. This was the band's first nomination. Although they did not expect to win they thought it was "cool" to be nominated. The ceremony took place on February 27, 2002, with Tool winning the award for their song "Schism".

== Bostaph's departure ==
Paul Bostaph sustained a chronic elbow injury that hindered his ability to drum and resulted in his decision to leave the band. His third-to-last performance with Slayer was recorded on War at the Warfield which Bostaph has not viewed the footage of, likening the experience to: "breaking up with a girlfriend," and saying he wants to move on with his life. Having no regrets from his time spent with the band Bostaph described the period as a high point in his career. He eventually rejoined Slayer in 2013 once again replacing Dave Lombardo.

Without a drummer and unable to finish their God Hates Us All tour Hanneman contacted original drummer Dave Lombardo and asked him if he would be willing to play for the remainder of the tour. Lombardo accepted the offer and played for the remaining 21 shows. However, he did not take on a permanent position with the band.

Following the tour, the band continued their search for a permanent drummer, and sought solicitation via demo tape and snail mail. Interested fans sent video recordings of renditions of the songs "Disciple," "God Send Death," "Stain of Mind," "Angel of Death", "Postmortem/Raining Blood," "South of Heaven," "War Ensemble," and "Seasons in the Abyss"; complete with résumés. The band listened to hundreds of demo tapes and created a "good pile" and "ungood pile" though the "ungood pile" was much larger. Those whose performances the band were pleased with were offered an audition in Dallas, San Francisco or Peoria, Illinois. Many applicants, however, were unable to attend due to flight costs. The band auditioned roughly two to three drummers a day and their top choice was one of Lombardo's recommendations: drummer Kevin Talley.

Slayer ultimately returned to Lombardo after deciding that they could not find a drummer who suited the job. He re-joined Slayer and attended music festivals worldwide to promote God Hates Us All and also recorded drums on the 2006 album Christ Illusion.

== Track listing ==
All tracks are written by Kerry King, except where noted.

No.	Title	Lyrics	Music	Length
1.	"Darkness of Christ"		Jeff Hanneman	1:30
2.	"Disciple"		Hanneman	3:35
3.	"God Send Death"	Hanneman; Tom Araya	Hanneman	3:45
4.	"New Faith"			3:05
5.	"Cast Down"			3:26
6.	"Threshold"		Hanneman	2:29
7.	"Exile"			3:55
8.	"Seven Faces"			3:41
9.	"Bloodline"	Hanneman; Araya	Hanneman; King	3:36
10.	"Deviance"	Hanneman; Araya	Hanneman	3:08
11.	"War Zone"			2:45
12.	"Here Comes the Pain"			4:32
13.	"Payback"			3:03
Total length:				42:14

Japanese and Collector's edition
No.	Title	Lyrics	Music	Length
1.	"Darkness of Christ"		Hanneman	1:30
2.	"Disciple"		Hanneman	3:35
3.	"God Send Death"	Araya; Hanneman	Hanneman	3:45
4.	"New Faith"			3:05
5.	"Cast Down"			3:26
6.	"Threshold"		Hanneman	2:29
7.	"Exile"			3:55
8.	"Seven Faces"			3:41
9.	"Bloodline"	Araya; Hanneman	Hanneman; King	3:20
10.	"Deviance"	Araya; Hanneman	Hanneman	3:08
11.	"War Zone"			2:45
12.	"Scarstruck" (bonus track)			3:29
13.	"Here Comes the Pain"			4:32
14.	"Payback"			3:03
15.	"Addict" (bonus track)		Hanneman	3:43
Total length:				49:10

=== Bonus Enhanced CD materials ===
- "Darkness of Christ" (DVD Intro video)
- "Bloodline" (Video)
- "Raining Blood/Hell Awaits" (Live Video) (San Francisco, CA - December 7, 2001)
- "Interview/B-Roll Footage

== Personnel ==
Personnel taken from God Hates Us All liner notes.

Slayer

- Tom Araya – vocals; bass (disputed) (Note: Tom Araya is credited with playing bass in the album's liner notes, although Kerry King has claimed to have played bass on all Slayer albums since the 1990s.)
- Jeff Hanneman – lead guitar
- Kerry King – lead and rhythm guitar; bass (claimed)
- Paul Bostaph – drums

Production

- Matt Hyde – production, recording engineering
- Dean Maher – recording engineering
- Sean Beavan – mixing
- Paul Forgues – assistant engineering
- Eddy Schreyer – mastering
- Rick Rubin – executive production
- Louis Marino – photo illustrations, art direction, design
- Rick Patrick – creative direction

== Charts ==
Chart (2001)	Peak position
Australian Albums (ARIA)	15
Austrian Albums (Ö3 Austria)	31
Belgian Albums (Ultratop Flanders)	16
Belgian Albums (Ultratop Wallonia)	36
Canadian Albums (Billboard)	9
Danish Albums (Hitlisten)	32
Dutch Albums (Album Top 100)	30
Finnish Albums (Suomen virallinen lista)	12
French Albums (SNEP)	25
German Albums (Offizielle Top 100)	9
Hungarian Albums (MAHASZ)	28
Irish Albums (IRMA)	24
Italian Albums (FIMI)	11
Japanese Albums (Oricon)	29
New Zealand Albums (RMNZ)	35
Polish Albums (ZPAV)	3
Scottish Albums (Official Charts)	27
Swedish Albums (Sverigetopplistan)	18
Swiss Albums (Schweizer Hitparade)	44
UK Albums (Official Charts)	31
UK Rock & Metal Albums (Official Charts)	2
US Billboard 200	28
