= Undisputed Attitude =

Studio album of cover songs by Slayer
- Released: May 28, 1996
- Recorded: January–February 1996
- Studios: Capitol (Hollywood); Hollywood Sound (Hollywood)
- Genres: Hardcore punk; crossover thrash
- Length: 32:54
- Label: American
- Producers: Slayer; Dave Sardy

Slayer chronology
Divine Intervention (1994)	Undisputed Attitude (1996)	Diabolus in Musica (1998)

Undisputed Attitude is the seventh studio album by American thrash metal band Slayer, released on May 28, 1996, by American Recordings. The album consists almost entirely of covers of punk rock and hardcore punk songs, and also includes two tracks written by guitarist Jeff Hanneman in 1984 and 1985 for a side project called Pap Smear; its closing track, "Gemini", is the only original track. The cover songs on the album were originally recorded by the bands the Stooges, Minor Threat, T.S.O.L., D.R.I., D.I., Dr. Know, and Verbal Abuse, whose work was prominently featured with the inclusion of cover versions of three of their songs.

Undisputed Attitude peaked at number 34 on the US Billboard 200.

== Recording ==
Undisputed Attitude was recorded at Capitol Studios in Los Angeles with Dave Sardy as producer and Reign in Blood producer Rick Rubin as executive producer. Recorded in three to four weeks, the album was largely the brainchild of guitarist Kerry King, who stated that the songs chosen were from highly influential bands who "made Slayer what it is". The album was initially to feature material from classic heavy metal artists such as Judas Priest, UFO and Deep Purple. However, after several rehearsals "things didn't pan out" according to King, so the band instead elected to cover punk songs.

Slayer considered covering 1960s psychedelic rock band the Doors as they were an influence to vocalist and bassist Tom Araya. When asked which track they considered recording, Araya responded, "Maybe 'When the Music's Over', 'Five to One', something like that." A cover of Black Flag's "Rise Above" was suggested by Rubin, although was shelved after the band was not sure how to arrange it musically.

Guitarist Jeff Hanneman had written four unreleased songs in 1984–1985 while in the side project Pap Smear with Slayer drummer Dave Lombardo and Suicidal Tendencies guitarist Rocky George. The band chose the best two, namely "Ddamm (Drunk Drivers Against Mad Mothers)" and "Can't Stand You". "Gemini" was written by King and Araya several months before entering the recording studio. King asserts it is the only Slayer song on the album. The song begins as a sludge/doom number, before becoming a more typical Slayer song.

The band's cover of Minor Threat's "Guilty of Being White" raised questions about a possible message of white supremacy. The controversy involved the changing of the refrain "guilty of being white" to "guilty of being right", at the song's ending. This incensed Minor Threat frontman Ian MacKaye, who stated "that is so offensive to me". King said the lyric was altered for "tongue-in-cheek" humor, saying that the band thought racism was "ridiculous" at the time.

== Reception ==
Professional ratings
Review scores
Source	Rating
AllMusic	2.5/5 stars
CMJ	mixed
Collector's Guide to Heavy Metal	7/10
Entertainment Weekly	C−
NME	7/10
Rolling Stone	3/5 stars

Undisputed Attitude was released on May 28, 1996, and peaked at number 34 on the Billboard 200 album chart. Paul Kott of AllMusic commented that "Undisputed Attitude, while not perfect, is a fitting tribute to the bands that inspired Slayer to break from the traditional metal mould." Sandy Masuo of Rolling Stone reasoned: "some punk purists will undoubtedly cry foul, but when the dust settles it's hard to argue with Slayer's mettle." Entertainment Weekly's Chuck Eddy dubbed Slayer's cover interpretations "generic hardcore-punk", and observed that the group "seem to think that playing as fast and rigidly as possible makes for harder rock -- but it's just lazy shtick."

Reviewing 2003 Slayer box set Soundtrack to the Apocalypse, Adrien Begrand of PopMatters dismissed the effort as "easily the weakest album in the Slayer catalogue", while Westword Online's Michael Roberts dubbed the record their "biggest mistake." Araya has since stated that he "knew it wouldn't do very well, people want to hear Slayer! The real die-hards picked up on it and that was expected."

== Track listing ==
Standard edition
No.	Title	Writer(s)	Original artist	Length
1.	"Disintegration/Free Money"	Eric Mastrokalos; Brett Dodwell; Roy Hansen	Verbal Abuse	1:41
2.	"Verbal Abuse/Leeches"	Mastrokalos; Dodwell; Hansen	Verbal Abuse	1:57
3.	"Abolish Government/Superficial Love"	Jack Grisham; Ron Emory; Mike Roche; Todd Barnes	T.S.O.L.	1:47
4.	"Can't Stand You"	Jeff Hanneman	Pap Smear	1:27
5.	"DDAMM (Drunk Drivers Against Mad Mothers)"	Hanneman	Pap Smear	1:01
6.	"Guilty of Being White"	Ian MacKaye	Minor Threat	1:06
7.	"I Hate You"	Mastrokalos; Dodwell; Hansen	Verbal Abuse	2:16
8.	"Filler/I Don't Want to Hear It"	MacKaye; Lyle Preslar; Brian Baker; Jeff Nelson	Minor Threat	2:28
9.	"Spiritual Law"	Casey Royer	D.I.	2:59
10.	"Mr. Freeze"	Kyle Toucher	Dr. Know	2:23
11.	"Violent Pacification"	Spike Cassidy; Kurt Brecht	D.R.I.	2:37
12.	"Richard Hung Himself"	Royer; Fredric Taccone	D.I.	3:21
13.	"I'm Gonna Be Your God" ("I Wanna Be Your Dog")	James Osterberg; Ron Asheton; Scott Asheton; David Alexander	The Stooges	2:58
14.	"Gemini"	Kerry King (music); Tom Araya (lyrics)	Slayer	4:53
Total length:				32:54

European edition
No.	Title	Writer(s)	Original artist	Length
10.	"Sick Boy" (bonus track)	Colin "Jock" Blyth; Colin Abrahall; Ross Lomas	GBH	2:14
11.	"Mr. Freeze"	Toucher	Dr. Know	2:23
12.	"Violent Pacification"	Cassidy; Brecht	D.R.I.	2:37
13.	"Richard Hung Himself"	Royer; Traccone	D.I.	3:21
14.	"I'm Gonna Be Your God" ("I Wanna Be Your Dog")	Osterberg; Asheton; Asheton; Alexander	The Stooges	2:58
15.	"Gemini"	King; Araya	Slayer	4:53
Total length:				35:08

Japanese edition
No.	Title	Writer(s)	Original artist	Length
10.	"Sick Boy" (bonus track)	Blyth; Abrahall; Lomas	GBH	2:14
11.	"Mr. Freeze"	Toucher	Dr. Know	2:23
12.	"Violent Pacification"	Cassidy; Brecht	D.R.I.	2:37
13.	"Memories of Tomorrow" (bonus track)	Mike Muir; Louiche Mayorga	Suicidal Tendencies	0:54
14.	"Richard Hung Himself"	Royer; Traccone	D.I.	3:21
15.	"I'm Gonna Be Your God" ("I Wanna Be Your Dog")	Osterberg; Asheton; Asheton; Alexander	The Stooges	2:58
16.	"Gemini"	King; Araya	Slayer	4:53
Total length:				36:02

== Personnel ==
=== Slayer ===
- Tom Araya – vocals, bass
- Jeff Hanneman – guitars
- Kerry King – guitars
- Paul Bostaph – drums

=== Production and artwork ===
- Slayer – production
- Dave Sardy – production, mixing
- Rick Rubin – executive production
- Greg Gordon – engineering
- Bill Smith and Jim Giddens – assistant engineering (Capitol)
- Ralph Cacciurri and Bryan Davis – assistant engineering (Hollywood Sound)
- Stephen Marcussen – mastering
- Wes Benscoter – artwork, illustrations
- Dennis Keeley – photography
- Michael Lavine – front cover photo, photography
- Dirk Walter – art direction, design

== Charts ==
Chart (1996)	Peak position
Australian Albums (ARIA)	16
Austrian Albums (Ö3 Austria)	43
Belgian Albums (Ultratop Flanders)	38
Belgian Albums (Ultratop Wallonia)	44
Canada Top Albums/CDs (RPM)	40
Dutch Albums (Album Top 100)	33
Finnish Albums (Suomen virallinen lista)	27
French Albums (SNEP)	43
German Albums (Offizielle Top 100)	45
Japanese Albums (Oricon)	37
New Zealand Albums (RMNZ)	22
Scottish Albums (Official Charts)	51
Swedish Albums (Sverigetopplistan)	20
UK Albums (Official Charts)	31
UK Rock & Metal Albums (Official Charts)	5
US Billboard 200	34
