= Diabolus in Musica =

Studio album by Slayer
- Released: June 9, 1998
- Recorded: 1997
- Studios: Ocean Way (Hollywood); Hollywood Sound (Hollywood)
- Genres: Groove metal; nu metal; alternative metal; thrash metal
- Length: 40:15
- Label: American
- Producer: Rick Rubin

Slayer chronology
Undisputed Attitude (1996)	Diabolus in Musica (1998)	God Hates Us All (2001)

Singles from Diabolus in Musica
- 1. "Stain of Mind" Released: September 30, 1998

Diabolus in Musica (Latin for "The Devil in Music") is the eighth studio album by American thrash metal band Slayer, released on June 9, 1998, by American Recordings. Guitarist Jeff Hanneman wrote most of the album's content, which has been described as Slayer's most experimental. It was the band's first album to be played mostly in C♯ tuning, and named after a musical interval known for its dissonance. Lyrical themes explored on the album include religion, sex, cultural deviance, death, insanity, war, and homicide.

Despite receiving mixed reviews from critics, Diabolus in Musica peaked at number 31 on the Billboard 200, selling over 46,000 copies in its first week of sales. By 2009, it had sold over 306,000 copies in the United States.

== Writing, music, and recording ==
Paul Bostaph returned to Slayer in early 1997 after his short-lived side project The Truth About Seafood, and the band entered the recording studio a few months later. Diabolus in Musica was recorded at Ocean Way Recording, and complete by September 1997. It was scheduled to be released the following month, but got delayed until the middle of 1998, after American Recordings was taken over by Columbia Records.

Slayer guitarist Jeff Hanneman described the writing process as, "When we were writing this album I was looking for something to beat; I wanted something to beat, but nothing impresses me right now. Nothing sounded really aggressive or heavy enough to inspire me to beat it, so I just had to come up with my own shit."

Adrien Begrand of PopMatters noted that Slayer introduced characteristics to its music including tuned down guitars, murky chord structures, and churning beats. He believed these characteristics were adopted in response to the then-burgeoning nu metal scene. As a result, Diabolus in Musica has been described as the aforementioned genre, groove metal, alternative metal and thrash metal, though in a less traditional sense than the band's previous and subsequent work.

== Album title and lyrical themes ==
"Bitter Peace"
"Bitter Peace" demonstrating Slayer's new musical approach incorporating down tuned guitars

Diabolus in Musica is a Latin term for "The Devil in Music" or tritone. Medieval musical rules did not allow this particular dissonance. According to one mythology, the interval was considered sexual and would bring out the devil; Slayer vocalist and bassist Tom Araya jokingly said that people were executed for writing and using the interval.

Araya held concern about the lyrics that King penned to "In the Name of God", voicing his opinion to guitarist Hanneman. King's viewpoint was; "It's like, 'C'mon, man, you're in Slayer. You're the antichrist — you said it yourself on the first album!' You can't draw the line like that. Whether he agrees with it or not, he didn't write it — I wrote it. So you have to say, 'Well, it's just a part of being in this band.' Now Jeff and I, we don't give a fuck. If Jeff wrote something I had a problem with, I would never even raise a fucking finger. I'd be like, 'Fuck yeah, let's do it! Gonna piss someone off? Alright!'"

== Touring and promotion ==
Following the release of the album, the band commenced the Diabolus in Musica tour. From 1998 to 1999, Slayer toured with Sepultura, System of a Down, Fear Factory, Kilgore, Clutch, Meshuggah, and Sick of It All. Slayer released a promotional 3-track album called Diabolus in Musica Tour Sampler. The album features 3 tracks, one from Diabolus in Musica ("Stain of Mind"), "Ship of Gold" off tourmate Clutch's The Elephant Riders and "Suite-Pee" (Clean Version) from the debut album by System of a Down.

== Reception ==
Professional ratings
Review scores
Source	Rating
AllMusic	3/5 stars
Collector's Guide to Heavy Metal	9/10
Entertainment Weekly	C+
Metal Forces	4/10
Kerrang!	4/5 stars
Metal Hammer	9/10
Q	3/5 stars
The Rolling Stone Album Guide	2/5 stars
Rock Hard	8.5/10
Spin	4/10

Diabolus in Musica was released on June 9, 1998, by American Recordings. In its first week of release, the album sold 46,000 copies in the United States, and debuted at number 31 on the Billboard 200. By November 2009, it had sold over 306,000 copies in the US.

Reviewing the 2003 Slayer box set Soundtrack to the Apocalypse, Adrien Begrand of PopMatters called Diabolus in Musica "a unique record [...] It's as if they're stepping in to show the young bands how to do it right, as songs like 'Bitter Peace', 'Death's Head', and the terrific 'Stain of Mind' blow away anything that young pretenders have put out." Writing in The Guardian, journalist Joel McIver said although the album was as musically heavy and lyrically dark as any of Slayer's previous releases, it exhibited the groove-based style of the then-popular nu metal sound. Metal Hammer's Ian Winwood called Diabolus in Musica "a fantastic album", writing: "It manages to combine (and this is meant in the best possible sense) both the sharpness of new school metal with the songwriting prowess and musical quality we've come to expect from [Slayer]."

However, not all reviews were positive. Reviewing a Slayer concert at Irving Plaza during the Diabolus in Musica tour, Ben Ratliff of The New York Times' panned the album for its murky production, saying: "Eight of the 11 songs on Diabolus in Musica, a few of which were played at the show, are in the same gray key, and the band's rhythmic ideas have a wearying sameness too." Reviewing Slayer's 2001 album God Hates Us All, Blabbermouth.net reviewer Borivoj Krgin described Diabolus in Musica as "a feeble attempt at incorporating updated elements into the group's sound, the presence of which elevated the band's efforts somewhat and offered hope that Slayer could refrain from endlessly rehashing their previous material for their future output." Sarah Vowell of Spin gave the album a four out of ten rating, stating that "Fifteen years into Slayer's career, they're still deploying the same fast beats and sluggish riffs and batty banter." concluding that "This is loudness without fun, blasphemy without subversion, darkness with no shades of gray. The drums are miked really well, though."

Songs from the album were rarely played live following the return of drummer Dave Lombardo in 2002, with "Stain of Mind" being the only constant.

=== Band members' views ===
Kerry King has expressed regret for the musical direction of Diabolus in Musica. In the "Nu Metal" episode of the 2011 VH1 documentary series Metal Evolution, he said the following in retrospect about the album:

That's the one record that I really paid not enough attention to because I was really bitter about what kind of music was popular. I thought it was, was very frat boy stuff, and maybe that's why it was popular, I don't know. So Diabolus didn't get as much attention from me because, you know, we didn't stay in focus. Looking back we were just saying, "alright, how do we make Slayer fit into today's society?" But, that's probably my least favorite record of our history. That's our Turbo [laughs].

Contrarily, drummer Paul Bostaph claims the album is his favorite as he thought the album was "as experimental as Slayer got". Araya also considers the album to be "very underrated".

Jeff Hanneman, who wrote most of the album's music, stated:

The biggest difference between this record and Divine Intervention [its 1994 predecessor] was that I wrote a lot of this one,” he explained. ‘With Divine… I was in a rut and couldn’t come up with riffs I like. Before I knew it, Kerry had most of it done. So, with this record I really started working hard from the beginning. I was thinking, ‘What do I want to hear on this record?’. If it sounds modern, it’s because we’re into modern music and that shows. The one thing I like about this record is that it is moody, by the time you get to the end, it reads like a book.

== Track listing ==
All music is composed by Jeff Hanneman, except "In the Name of God", by Kerry King.

No.	Title	Lyrics	Length
1.	"Bitter Peace"	Hanneman	4:32
2.	"Death's Head"	Hanneman	3:34
3.	"Stain of Mind"	King	3:24
4.	"Overt Enemy"	Hanneman	4:41
5.	"Perversions of Pain"	King	3:33
6.	"Love to Hate"	Hanneman; King	3:07
7.	"Desire"	Tom Araya	4:19
8.	"In the Name of God"	King	3:40
9.	"Scrum"	King	2:16
10.	"Screaming from the Sky"	Hanneman; Araya; King	3:12
11.	"Point"	King	4:11
Total length:			40:15

All music is composed by Hanneman, except where noted.

Australian & European editions
No.	Title	Lyrics	Music	Length
1.	"Bitter Peace"	Hanneman		4:32
2.	"Death's Head"	Hanneman		3:29
3.	"Stain of Mind"	King		3:24
4.	"Overt Enemy"	Hanneman		4:41
5.	"Perversions of Pain"	King		3:30
6.	"Love to Hate"	Hanneman; King		3:05
7.	"Desire"	Araya		4:19
8.	"In the Name of God"	King	King	3:38
9.	"Scrum"	King		2:18
10.	"Screaming from the Sky"	Araya; Hanneman; King		3:12
11.	"Wicked" (bonus track)	Araya; Paul Bostaph	Hanneman; King	6:00
12.	"Point"	King		4:12
Total length:				46:15

All music is composed by Hanneman, except where noted.

Japanese edition
No.	Title	Lyrics	Music	Length
1.	"Bitter Peace"	Hanneman		4:32
2.	"Death's Head"	Hanneman		3:29
3.	"Stain of Mind"	King		3:24
4.	"Overt Enemy"	Hanneman		4:41
5.	"Perversions of Pain"	King		3:30
6.	"Love to Hate"	Hanneman; King		3:05
7.	"Desire"	Araya		4:19
8.	"Unguarded Instinct" (bonus track)	King		3:42
9.	"In the Name of God"	King	King	3:38
10.	"Scrum"	King		2:18
11.	"Screaming from the Sky"	Araya; Hanneman; King		3:12
12.	"Wicked" (bonus track)	Araya; Bostaph	Hanneman; King	6:00
13.	"Point"	King		4:12
Total length:				49:57

== Personnel ==
Slayer

- Tom Araya – vocals, bass
- Jeff Hanneman – guitars
- Kerry King – guitars
- Paul Bostaph – drums

Leads

- Bitter Peace – King/Hanneman
- Death's Head – Hanneman
- Overt Enemy – both: Hanneman
- Perversions of Pain – King
- Love to Hate – King
- Desire – King/Hanneman
- In the Name of God – both: King
- Scrum – both: King
- Screaming From the Sky – King
- Point – 1st: King, 2nd: Hanneman, 3rd: King

Technical personnel

- Rick Rubin – production
- Slayer – co-production
- Greg Gordon – engineering
- John Tyree – assistant engineering (Ocean Way)
- Allen Sanderson – assistant engineering (Ocean Way)
- Wade Goeke – assistant engineering (Hollywood Sound)
- Brian Davis – assistant engineering (Hollywood Sound)
- Sebastian Haimerl – assistant engineering (Groove Masters)
- Howie Weinberg – mastering
- Exum – photography
- Frank – art direction

== Charts ==
Chart (1998)	Peak position
Australian Albums (ARIA)	35
Austrian Albums (Ö3 Austria)	40
Belgian Albums (Ultratop Flanders)	32
Canada Top Albums/CDs (RPM)	30
Dutch Albums (Album Top 100)	52
Finnish Albums (Suomen virallinen lista)	18
French Albums (SNEP)	23
German Albums (Offizielle Top 100)	32
Hungarian Albums (MAHASZ)	23
Japanese Albums (Oricon)	19
New Zealand Albums (RMNZ)	15
Scottish Albums (Official Charts)	30
Swedish Albums (Sverigetopplistan)	29
UK Albums (Official Charts)	27
UK Rock & Metal Albums (Official Charts)	2
US Billboard 200	31
