= Repentless =

Studio album by Slayer
- Released: September 11, 2015
- Recorded: March, September 2014 – January 2015
- Studio: Henson Recording (Hollywood)
- Genre: Thrash metal
- Length: 41:57
- Label: Nuclear Blast
- Producer: Terry Date

Slayer chronology
The Big Four: Live from Sofia, Bulgaria (2010)	Repentless (2015)	The Repentless Killogy (Live at the Forum in Inglewood, CA) (2019)

Singles from Repentless
- 1. "Implode" Released: April 24, 2014; 2. "When the Stillness Comes" Released: May 18, 2015; 3. "Repentless" Released: June 19, 2015; 4. "Cast the First Stone" Released: September 7, 2015; 5. "You Against You" Released: March 16, 2016; 6. "Pride in Prejudice" Released: September 6, 2016

Repentless (stylized as Repen𐕣less) is the twelfth and final studio album by American thrash metal band Slayer, released on September 11, 2015. This is the band's only album recorded without guitarist Jeff Hanneman, who died from liver cirrhosis in 2013 and was replaced by Gary Holt (though Hanneman did receive a songwriting credit on the song "Piano Wire"). It is also the first album to feature drummer Paul Bostaph since God Hates Us All (2001). Repentless is also the only album the band released on Nuclear Blast and was produced by Terry Date, replacing Rick Rubin after twenty-nine years and nine studio albums as their producer or executive producer. The six-year gap between World Painted Blood (2009) and Repentless was also the longest between two Slayer albums in their career.

Three singles were released from the album: "Repentless," "You Against You" and "Pride in Prejudice". The album debuted at no. 4 on the Billboard 200, the highest-charting debut from the band in its native country. It also topped the chart in Germany and featured in the top ten of almost twenty charts around the world. It received generally positive reviews from critics.

== Background ==
When asked in May 2011 if Slayer was going to make a follow-up to World Painted Blood (2009), then-Slayer drummer Dave Lombardo replied that, although nothing had been written yet, there were "definitely plans." In early 2011, guitarist Jeff Hanneman contracted necrotizing fasciitis. Reports linked this illness with a spider bite he claimed to have received while in a friend's hot tub. When asked about a new record, singer/bassist Tom Araya stated that any work would have to wait until Hanneman had recovered.

On February 20, 2013, it was announced that Lombardo would not take part in Slayer's Australia tour due to contractual disputes, and his place would be taken by former drummer Jon Dette. Being interviewed in late February by Soundwave TV, guitarist Kerry King elaborated more on the personnel status for the album. He expressed doubt as to who might produce the album, saying that Metallica "monopolized" producer Greg Fidelman. The continued absence of Hanneman further contributed to the uncertainty. Lombardo's permanent replacement was later announced to be Paul Bostaph, who was previously the band's drummer from 1992 to 2001, appearing on several albums.

On May 2, 2013, Jeff Hanneman died of liver failure in a Los Angeles hospital. A week later, the official cause of death was announced as alcohol-related cirrhosis. Hanneman and his family had apparently been unaware of the extent of condition until shortly before his death. King had announced his desire for the band to continue, but Araya was more uncertain, stating, "After 30 years, it would literally be like starting over," and expressing doubts that Slayer's fanbase would approve of such a change. In March 2015, Araya revealed that the band had recorded one song prior to Hanneman's passing, and that the song would appear on the album. The result was the song "Piano Wire". Araya explained that Hanneman would be a part on the album when King later dismissed the claim saying, "Jeff Hanneman isn't physically playing on this record. Somebody reported some bullshit. People say shit when they don't know what's actually going on. Even though Jeff's song, "Piano Wire", was recorded during the last album cycle, I played all the guitar. I've been doing that for years. Since he has no lead on that song, he's not on it."

== Writing and production ==
The album's writing process started in November 2011, announced by Lombardo through Twitter. King later said that he and Lombardo had been working on music prior to the holidays and that they had completed three songs, in addition to three outtakes from the previous record. It was initially hoped that the album would be ready for release by summer of 2012, but this did not come to fruition. Frontman Tom Araya later said that the album would be pushed back to a 2013 release, but this idea fell through.

In addition, King had noted that two of the new songs had been fully recorded and that there was a possibility that they might be released as an EP, but the idea was later dismissed. King announced the songs' titles as "Chasing Death" and "Implode." Araya announced that the band would start writing the new album upon completion of the 2012 Mayhem Festival tour, which ended in August of that year. Since their recorded songs still needed to be mixed, King announced in a late August 2012 interview that there had been a twelve-day window where the band had been able to "hijack Greg Fidelman from Metallica" for further production on the album. By then, the band had two songs that were missing lead guitar parts and vocals and had recorded six demos. In addition, King said that the band had yet to record three more demos.

In February 2013 during an interview with Eddie Trunk, King declared that, while Hanneman still had not been involved with the album, the band was waiting for label issues to be resolved before recording. King stated that he and Lombardo had eight songs that they were working on, as well. When asked about whether or not Exodus guitarist Gary Holt, who had been filling in for Hanneman during live shows, would play on the record, King denied it, saying that he would handle all guitars except for Hanneman's lead parts. King also said that Hanneman had yet to offer up any material for the album. Araya later contradicted King's statement about Hanneman and stated that Hanneman had been working on material for the album. Shortly after Hanneman's death, Araya revealed that Hanneman had gone so far as to send Araya music that he had been working on, and Araya later said that some of this material—including an outtake from World Painted Blood—may make it onto the album.

Even prior to Hanneman's death, King had expressed doubt as to who would even play on the album. He stated that if work on the album could be done in June 2013, then it was hoped that the album could be out by the following September or October. After Hanneman's passing, Holt was asked if he will be featured on the album, to which he replied that he would probably be playing some solos on the album, but that the rest of the guitar work would all be King. King later confirmed this sentiment, but explained that Holt would not be participating in any of the writing, noting: "fans aren't ready for it."

According to Holt, recording for the album was expected to commence at the end of 2013. King later stated that there were plans to begin recording in January 2014. King further revealed that he and drummer Paul Bostaph have recorded 11 songs on a demo, while also working on some additional tracks, seven of which had complete lyrics. On April 24, 2014, Slayer offered a free download of "Implode," their first song in five years as well as their first recording to feature Holt on guitar. Additionally, it is the first recording to feature Bostaph on drums since 2001's God Hates Us All. On the same day, it was announced that Slayer had signed to Nuclear Blast, and would release their eleventh studio album in early 2015.

In 2017, Holt talked about recording the guitar solos, "That's one of my favorites on the album. I'm never blown away by anything I've done musically. I always want to redo it five minutes after I'm done with it. That goes down to songwriting too - it's never going to be perfect. Nothing's perfect. So yeah, I went in and did all the solos for that album in a day. I just sat down with a six pack of beer with Kerry and Terry Date. They just let me do my own thing. Tom came in after I had been messing around with a solo for a half an hour and he told me the first take was perfect. I told him they've got to let me know because I'll keep going over it and sometimes you lose a good thing when that happens. You've got to know when to just let it go and keep it whether it's raw or rough or perfect or maybe there a little bit of magic in there."

== Music and lyrics ==
In an interview, King described "Chasing Death" as being about alcoholism: "it's like people who drink too much. They don't help themselves out so they're chasing death." He explained "Implode" as being about the end of the world. The album featured one song, "Piano Wire", that was written by Hanneman prior to his passing.

In October 2014, the band revealed plans to release a new song, entitled "When the Stillness Comes," via Scion AV, an "in-house record label and lifestyle marketing division" of Toyota's Scion brand. The song was released for Record Store Day on April 18, 2015. On June 19, 2015, Slayer made the title track available for streaming on YouTube. On August 31, 2015, Slayer released "Cast the First Stone," another track on the album, via the Adult Swim singles program. On September 3, 2015, a behind the scenes mini-documentary looking at the making of the music video for the album's title track was released by Rolling Stone.

== Reception ==
Professional ratings
Aggregate scores
Source	Rating
Metacritic	70/100
Review scores
Source	Rating
AllMusic	3/5 stars
Billboard	3/5 stars
Classic Rock	4/5 stars
Exclaim!	7/10
The Guardian	4/5 stars
The New York Times	3.5/5 stars
Record Collector	2/5 stars
Rolling Stone	3/5 stars
Spin	6/10
Uncut	3.5/5 stars

In April 2014, the band released "Implode" for free. Rolling Stone said the song "plays out like classic Slayer," although the lyrics were described as "expect[ed]" subject matter. Alex Young of Consequences of Sound called the song a "pummeling assault of metal music." In January 2015, the album, yet to be titled at the time, was mentioned by Loudwire as one of the "30 Most Anticipated Rock + Metal Albums of 2015," alongside expected albums by bands like Black Sabbath, Iron Maiden, Anthrax, Megadeth, Testament, Metallica and Tool. Repentless sold 49,000 copies in its first week and debuted number four on the US Billboard 200, the band's highest position in its native country. The album fell to number 34 on the Billboard 200 in its second week, selling 11,000 copies. Seven weeks after being released, Repentless sold over 80,000 copies in the US.

Repentless received generally positive reviews on Metacritic. Writing for Exclaim!, Greg Pratt said that Repentless "isn't going to be one of the classic Slayer albums, but there's still plenty of good thrash to be found." Journalist J.C. Maçek III of Spectrum Culture wrote "The truth is that it might be easy to dismiss Slayer after almost 35 years as a nostalgic metal act. This would be a travesty and a mistake. Slayer not only has something new to say on Repentless, but a new way to say it." AllMusic writer Thom Jurek gave the album three out of five stars, calling Repentless "a retro, workmanlike effort from a band determined to soldier on, and that's fine. There are hardcore devotees who never want their favorite bands to change; this is for them. But again, given all that's transpired since 2009, Slayer get points for even pulling this off." The Guardian stated that "Slayer have always been a model of consistency and a band that fans of vicious, vein-bursting heavy metal can rely on." Kim Kelly, writing in Spin was less enthusiastic, calling the album "middling" and stating that it "mostly falls flat."

=== Accolades ===
Year-end rankings

Publication	Accolade	Rank
OC Weekly	The 10 Best Metal Albums of 2015	2
Rolling Stone	20 Best Metal Albums of 2015	15

Decade-end rankings

Publication	Accolade	Rank
Discogs	The 200 Best Albums of the 2010s	97
Kerrang!	The 75 Best Albums of the 2010s	61
Louder Sound	The 50 Best Metal Albums of the 2010s	18

== Track listing ==
All songs written by Tom Araya & Kerry King except where noted.

No.	Title	Writer(s)	Length
1.	"Delusions of Saviour" (instrumental)	King	1:55
2.	"Repentless"		3:19
3.	"Take Control"		3:14
4.	"Vices"		3:32
5.	"Cast the First Stone"		3:43
6.	"When the Stillness Comes"		4:20
7.	"Chasing Death"		3:45
8.	"Implode"		3:49
9.	"Piano Wire"	Jeff Hanneman	2:49
10.	"Atrocity Vendor"	King	2:55
11.	"You Against You"		4:20
12.	"Pride in Prejudice"		4:14
Total length:			41:55

Japanese edition bonus tracks
No.	Title	Writer(s)	Length
13.	"War Ensemble" (live at Wacken 2014)	Araya, Hanneman	4:59
14.	"Black Magic" (live at Wacken 2014)	King, Hanneman	3:53
Total length:			50:47

Note

- All usages of the letter "T" in song titles are stylized as the St. Peter's crosses in the CD booklet (i.e. "Repen𐕣less")

== Personnel ==
Personnel taken from Repentless CD booklet.

Slayer

- Tom Araya – vocals; bass (disputed) (Note: Tom Araya is credited with playing bass in the album's liner notes, although Kerry King has claimed to have played bass on all Slayer albums since the 1990s.)
- Kerry King – lead and rhythm guitar; bass (claimed)
- Gary Holt – lead guitar on "Repentless", "Vices", "Cast the First Stone", and "You Against You"
- Paul Bostaph – drums

Lead Guitar Credits

- Repentless – Holt/King/Holt
- Take Control – King
- Vices – King/Holt
- Cast the First Stone – Holt/King
- Chasing Death – King
- Implode – both: King
- Piano Wire – King
- Atrocity Vendor – King
- You Against You – first: Holt, second: Holt/King, third: King
- Pride and Prejudice – King

Production

- Terry Date – production, engineering, mixing
- Peter Mack – additional engineering
- Derrick Stockwell – assistant engineering
- Howie Weinberg – mastering at Weinberg Mastering, Los Angeles, CA
- John Araya – studio bass and guitar technician
- John Goss and Gene Provencio – studio drum technician

Artwork

- Marcelo Vasco – cover artwork
- Marcelo Vasco and Rob Kimura – album layouts
- Andrew Stuart – photography

== Charts ==
=== Weekly charts ===
Chart (2015)	Peak position
Australian Albums (ARIA)	3
Austrian Albums (Ö3 Austria)	6
Belgian Albums (Ultratop Flanders)	4
Belgian Albums (Ultratop Wallonia)	7
Canadian Albums (Billboard)	3
Danish Albums (Hitlisten)	9
Dutch Albums (Album Top 100)	2
Finnish Albums (Suomen virallinen lista)	3
French Albums (SNEP)	7
German Albums (Offizielle Top 100)	1
Hungarian Albums (MAHASZ)	4
Irish Albums (IRMA)	15
Italian Albums (FIMI)	8
Japanese Albums (Oricon)	10
New Zealand Albums (RMNZ)	8
Norwegian Albums (VG-lista)	6
Polish Albums (ZPAV)	2
Portuguese Albums (AFP)	4
Scottish Albums (Official Charts)	7
Spanish Albums (Promusicae)	8
Swedish Albums (Sverigetopplistan)	5
Swiss Albums (Schweizer Hitparade)	3
UK Albums (Official Charts)	11
UK Independent Albums (Official Charts)	2
UK Rock & Metal Albums (Official Charts)	2
US Billboard 200	4
US Independent Albums (Billboard)	1
US Top Hard Rock Albums (Billboard)	2
US Top Rock Albums (Billboard)	2
US Indie Store Album Sales (Billboard)	1

=== Year-end charts ===
Chart (2015)	Position
Belgian Albums (Ultratop Flanders)	152
German Albums (Offizielle Top 100)	92
US Top Rock Albums (Billboard)	54
US Top Hard Rock Albums (Billboard)	17

== Certifications ==
Region	Certification	Certified units/sales
Poland (ZPAV)	Gold	10,000^{‡}
^{‡} Sales+streaming figures based on certification alone.
