= List of professional sports teams in Maine =

Maine is the 42nd most populated state in the United States and has a rich history of professional sports.

== Active teams ==
Baseball
League	Team	City	Stadium	Capacity
EL (AA)	Portland Sea Dogs	Portland	Hadlock Field	7,368
Basketball
League	Team	City	Arena	Capacity
G-League	Maine Celtics	Portland	Portland Exposition Building	3,000
Ice hockey
League	Team	City	Arena	Capacity
ECHL	Maine Mariners	Portland	Cross Insurance Arena	6,206
Soccer
League	Team	City	Stadium	Capacity
USL1	Portland Hearts of Pine	Portland	Fitzpatrick Stadium	5,500

=== Map of cities with a professional sports team ===
Location with a professional sports team

== See also ==
- Sports in Maine
