= Maine Principals' Association =

- Abbreviation: MPA
- Formation: 1927
- Type: Volunteer; NPO
- Legal status: Association
- Purpose: Athletic/Educational
- Headquarters: 50 Industrial Dr. Augusta, ME 04338
- Region served: Maine
- Members: 153 high schools
- Executive Director: Richard A. Durost
- Affiliations: National Federation of State High School Associations
- Staff: 12
- Website: mpa.cc
- Remarks: (207) 622-0217

The Maine Principals’ Association (MPA) is the governing body for sports competitions among all public and some private high schools in the U.S. state of Maine. It is a member of the National Federation of State High School Associations. The MPA offices are located in Augusta.

Conference	KVAC	SMAA	WMC	MVC	Big East	Aroostook	East/West
	Bangor	Biddeford	Cape Elizabeth	Boothbay	Bangor Christian	Ashland	Buckfield
	Belfast	Bonny Eagle	Freeport	Dirigo	Bucksport	Central Aroostook	Carrabec
	Brewer	Cheverus	Fryeburg	Hall-Dale	Calais	East Grand	Forest Hills
	Brunswick	Deering	Gray-New Gloucester	Lisbon	Caribou	Easton	Islesboro
	Camden Hills	Falmouth	Greely	Madison	Central	Fort Fairfield	North Haven
	Cony	Gorham	Lake Region	Maranacook	Deer-Isle Stonington	Fork Kent	Rangley
	Edward Little	Kennebunk	Maine Coast Waldorf	Monmouth	Dexter	Hodgdon	Richmond
	Erskine	Marshwood	North Yarmouth	Mt Abram	Ellsworth	Houlton	Valley
	Gardiner	Massabesic	Old Orchard Beach	Mountain Valley	Ellsworth	Katahdin	Vinalhaven
	Hamden	Noble	Poland	Oak Hill	Foxcroft	Madawaska	Wiscasset
	Lawrence	Portland	Sacopee Valley	Spruce Mountain	Woodland	Maine School Science and Math	Greenville
	Leavitt	Sanford	Traip	Telstar	George Stevens	Southern Aroostook	
	Lewiston	Scarborough	Waynefleet	Winthrop	Hermon	Van Buren	
	Lincoln	South Portland	Wells		John Babst	Washburn	
	Maine Central Institute	Thornton Academy	Yarmouth		Jonesport-Beals	Wisdom	
	Medomak Valley	Westbrook	York		Lee Academy		
	Messalonskee	Windham			Machias		
	Morse				Mattanawcook		
	Mt Ararat				Mt Desert Island		
	Mt Blue				Narraguagus		
	Mt View				Old Town		
	Nokomis				Orono		
	Oceanside				Penobscot		
	Oxford Hills				Penquis		
	Skowhegan				Piscataquis		
	Waterville				Presque Isle		
	Winslow				Schenck		
					Searsport		
					Shead		
					Stearns		
					Sumner		
					Washington Academy		

== History ==
First established in 1927 as the State Principals' Association, it became the Maine Principals' Association in 1992 as a result of a merger between the Maine Secondary School Principals' Association (est. 1951) and the Maine Elementary Principals' Association (est. 1975).

== Athletic Classifications ==
Schools competing under the MPA are grouped into (at most) four classes, with different enrollment cutoffs for each sport (Broken down by season):

=== Membership ===
Sport	Class A	Class B	Class C	Class D
Cross Country	700+	400–699	0–399	
Field Hockey	716+	475–715	0–474	
Football	875+	600–874	455–599	0–454
Golf	650+	375–699	0–374	
Soccer	705+	425–704	190–424	0–189
Volleyball	500+	0–499		

=== Winter ===
Sport	Class A	Class B	Class C	Class D
Basketball	705+	425–704	190–424	0–189
Cheerleading	705+	425–704	192–424	0–191
Drama	525+	0–524		
Boys' ice hockey	860+	0–859		
Girls' ice hockey	Only One Class			
Skiing	675+	500–674	0–499	
Swimming	700+	0–699		
Indoor Track	700+	0–699		
Wrestling	685+	475–684	0–474	
Unified Basketball	Only One Class			

=== Spring ===
Sport	Class A	Class B	Class C	Class D
Baseball	705+	425–704	192–424	0–191
Lacrosse	750+	0–749		
Softball	705+	425–704	192–424	0–191
Tennis	700+	400–699	0–399	
Outdoor Track	700+	461–699	0–460	

Schools are reclassified every two years. The classification thresholds are currently being adjusted and would go into effect for the fall 2013 sports season. A school may petition the Association to play in a class above or below its enrollment figure. Currently, most sports are split into "Northern" and" "Southern" regions. Championships are played at several locations around the state including Fitzpatrick Stadium (football) and basketball championships between the Cross Insurance Center, Augusta Civic Center), the Portland Exposition Building and the Cumberland County Civic Center depending on class and geographical region. The MPA uses a mathematical system called heal points to determine tournament standings, the latest heal points and an explanation on how to determine the points can be found here. Currently basketball, soccer, ice hockey, lacrosse and tennis are the only sports to have separate male and female teams, baseball is male only and softball is female only. Girls ice hockey became a sanctioned sport as of the winter 2008 season.

== Other programs ==
Other activities the MPA also sponsors include debate, drama, National Honor Society, science fair, speech, Student Council, and E-Sports. In addition to interscholastic events, the MPA offers a "Professional Division", which provides opportunities for education and professional advancement for elementary, middle/junior high and high school principals, assistant principals, technical education center directors, assistant directors and other administrators who function primarily as building principals or assistant principals.
