= Portland Ice Arena =

Portland Ice Arena may refer to:

- Portland Ice Arena (Maine)
- Portland Ice Arena (Oregon)
