= Big Ears Festival =

Music festival in Knoxville, Tennessee, US

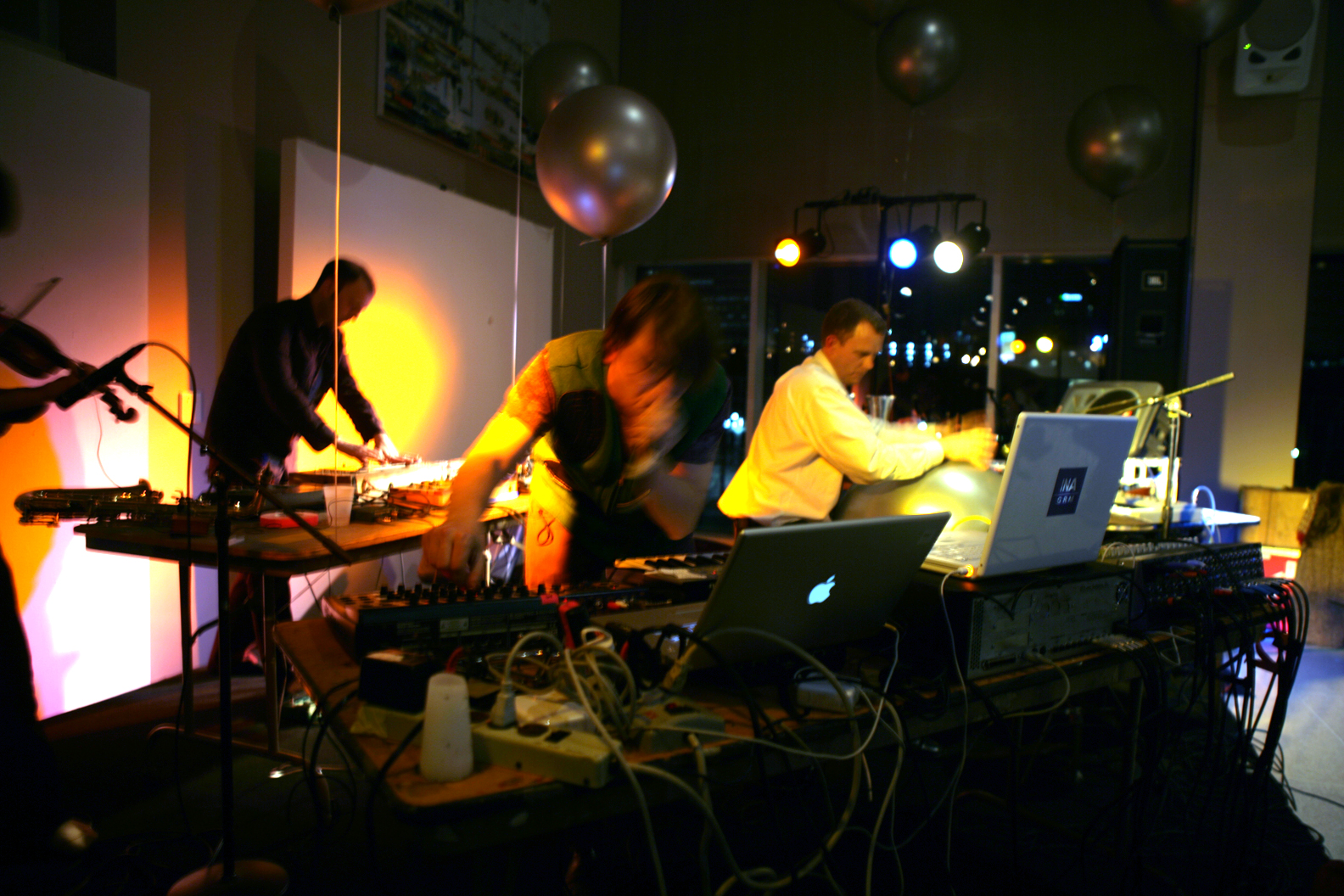
- Big Ears Festival 2009 with Matmos performing
- Genre: Indie rock, Classical music, Contemporary classical music, Alternative rock, Minimalist music, Jazz, Metal, Electronica
- Locations: Knoxville, Tennessee, United States
- Coordinates: 35.9642°N 83.9175°W
- Years active: 2009–2010, 2014–2019, 2022–
- Website: https://bigearsfestival.com

The Big Ears Festival is an annual music festival in Knoxville, Tennessee. The 2009, 2010 and 2014-2019 editions were produced by AC Entertainment. The festival incorporated as a 501(c)(3) non-profit organization in 2016 and has been independently produced since 2022.

The name of the festival is alludes to the music industry slang term "big ears", which refers to an especially perceptive listener.

== History ==
The festival was founded in 2009 by Ashley Capps, founder of AC Entertainment. The festival was originally organized by Capps in partnership with Jason Boardman of Knoxville's Pilot Light and Chris Molinski of the Knoxville Museum of Art.

The 2009 edition, which took place February 6–8, featured Antony And The Johnsons, Burning Star Core, Nicolas Collins, David Daniell, Dan Deacon, Fence Kitchen, Fennesz, Fennesz/linkous/minor, Michael Gira, Philip Glass, Larkin Grimm, Neil Hamburger, Jon Hassell, Matmos, The Necks, Negativland, Pauline Oliveros, Wendy Sutter, Shaking Ray Levis, and Ned Rothenberg.

In 2010, famed composer Terry Riley was named as the first "Artist in Residence" of the Big Ears Festival. The festival celebrated his 75th birthday year with three days of concerts by Terry Riley and a host of collaborators. In addition to Riley as "Artist in Residence", musician Bryce Dessner of the band The National was a guest curator of the festival.

The 2010 edition, which took place March 26–28, featured Abe Vigoda, Ahleuchatistas, Sam Amidon, Andrew W.K., Argentinum Astrum, Bang on a Can All-Stars, William Basinski, Adrian Belew, Iva Bittova, The Books, Buke & Gass, Calder Quartet, Clogs, Damaged Patients, Bryce Dessner, Destroyed By Magnets, Dirty Projectors, Doveman, The 802 Tour, Eric-jon, The Ex, Forest Magic, Ben Frost, Gang Gang Dance, Jens Hannemann, Tim Hecker, Shelley Hirsch, Javelin, jj, Konk Pack, Lesser Gonzalez Alvarez, Liturgy, Andy Moor, Nico Muhly, My Brightest Diamond, The National, New Brutalism, Joanna Newsom, Nosaj Thing, Gyan Riley, Terry Riley, DJ/rupture, Shaking Ray Levis, Shortwave Society, Tracy Silverman, Nadia Sirota, Ches Smith, Sufjan Stevens, St. Vincent, Vampire Weekend, Videohippos, Villages, Warband, and The xx.

In addition to the musical performances in 2010, Jessica Dessner, sister of Bryce Dessner, organized the first Big Ears film festival at the Knoxville Museum of Art which featured an exhibition of The BQE by Sufjan Stevens.

Big Ears 2011, originally planned for the first half of the year, was eventually postponed due to scheduling conflicts, and then quietly canceled altogether.

In the summer of 2013, AC Entertainment began to tease a revival of the event on its official Facebook page, pledging news "in the coming weeks". Big Ears' return was announced on October 23, 2013 and took place March 28–30, 2014. Curated by Steve Reich, it featured Television, John Cale, Julia Holter, Low, and Radiohead's Jonny Greenwood among others.

The 2015 edition featured Kronos Quartet, Laurie Anderson, Swans, Ben Frost, William Tyler, Max Richter, Silver Apples, Steve Gunn, Grouper, Nels Cline, Zs, Omar Souleyman, among others.

The 2016 edition featured Kamasi Washington, Angel Olsen, Andrew Bird, Laurie Anderson with Philip Glass, Marc Ribot, Faust, Yo La Tengo, Lambchop, Sunn O))) and many others.

The festival went on hiatus in 2020 and 2021 to help contain the spread of the virus during the COVID-19 pandemic. Big Ears returned in 2022 with another four-day festival taking place March 24-27, 2022. The 2023 edition ran from March 30 - April 2, 2023.

== Reviews ==
Ben Ratliff, writing for The New York Times in 2009: "You could say that Big Ears was for people who like hearing nuanced music in excellent theaters, in a city with no hassle: a place where you can walk down the main drag on Saturday night and see 10 feet of empty space between you and the next pair of feet. You could also say that Big Ears was for people with long attention spans, good concentration and an appetite for letting repetitive non-dance music wash over them. And at least in its first edition — Mr. Capps intends to repeat Big Ears in Knoxville, and also export the idea to other cities — Big Ears was for concertgoers who appreciate not hearing a lot of introductions and context and sponsor announcements before the music even starts. In other words, at times it was heaven."

In 2010 the festival was praised by Rolling Stone as "arguably the classiest, most diverse festival in the country."

After an extremely successful return of the festival in 2014, Christopher Weingarten of Rolling Stone wrote that "Big Ears 2014 is the most ambitious avant-garde festival to emerge in America in more than a decade."
