= Raining Blood =

Song by Slayer

from the album Reign in Blood
- Released: October 7, 1986
- Recorded: 1986
- Studio: Hit City West (Los Angeles)
- Genre: Thrash metal
- Length: 4:14
- Label: Def Jam
- Composer: Jeff Hanneman
- Lyricists: Jeff Hanneman; Kerry King
- Producers: Rick Rubin; Slayer

Audio sample
- A sample from "Raining Blood", where the core riff comes into play after a 30-second introduction.: file; help

"Raining Blood" is a song by American thrash metal band Slayer. Written by Jeff Hanneman and Kerry King for their third studio album Reign in Blood (1986), the song's religious concept is about overthrowing Heaven.

The song is four minutes and fourteen seconds in duration. It starts with 33 seconds of rain sound effects and ends with a minute of more rain sound effects. Described as a "classic" by AllMusic, it is noted by fans as one of Slayer's most popular songs. As an almost permanent addition to their live sets, both Hanneman and King acknowledged it as their favorite song to play live. Many of Slayer's live performances of the song have been captured on the band's live albums and also multi-band compilation albums, including MTV2 Headbangers Ball (2003).

== Writing and concept ==
"Raining Blood" was written by Jeff Hanneman and Kerry King. D. X. Ferris said that "when Hanneman wrote the song, he envisioned a scene from a dark street or bloody back alley", and later went on to say that the song "described a banished soul awakened and hungry for vengeance." The second verse was written by King, who "pick[ed] up on Hanneman's title and in his new direction". The song, along with the rest of Reign in Blood, was recorded in 1986 in Los Angeles, California, with producer Rick Rubin.

Hanneman explained that "it's about a guy who's in Purgatory 'cause he was cast out of Heaven. He's waiting for revenge and wants to fuck that place up." King later said that "the rest of the song explains what happens when he starts fucking people up. The lyrics 'Return to power draws near' is because he's waiting to get strong enough again to overthrow Heaven. And then 'Fall into me, the sky's crimson tears' is everybody's blood flowing into him. So basically, 'Raining Blood' is all the angels' blood falling on him."

== Composition ==
"Raining Blood" is four minutes and fourteen seconds long, and it is Reign in Blood's closing track. The song is one of three songs from the album that exceeds three minutes in length. Steve Huey from Allmusic proposed that "Reign in Blood opens and closes with slightly longer tracks (the classics 'Angel of Death' and 'Raining Blood') whose slower riffs offer most of the album's few hints of melody." The song's music was written solely by guitarist Hanneman (who was also a primary writer of the song's lyrics), who presented both hostility and anger in his writing. Huey also noted that "the riffs are built on atonal chromaticism that sounds as sickening as the graphic violence depicted in many of the lyrics", and said that it was "monstrously" and "terrifyingly evocative".

Clay Jarvis from Stylus Magazine wrote that the song possessed "a red-herring, scorched-earth intro, eerie thunderstorm-and-tom-tom-triplet interlude and one of the most recognizable riffs in metal history. It is a dynamic, explosive and fitting end to a remarkable, violent experience." D. X. Ferris, author of the 33⅓ book Reign In Blood, wrote that the song "lunges to life with its core riff, the ten most recognizable notes in metal, a diminished-scale run down the fretboard that's the most badass guitar riff since Black Sabbath's 'Sweet Leaf'." Guitarist Kerry King said that "The intro is big with the two harmony and then the first beat that Dave [Lombardo] does, that double-kick thing, and it's like this backwards gallop that gets the crowd going wherever you are."

Revolver stated the song contains the earliest example of what is now considered a breakdown. Halfway through this section of the song, Kerry King begins playing a melodic lead line overtop the rhythm section. Matt Mills of Metal Hammer stated that the breakdown "bypasses rational thought and catches you straight in the 'fat riff and simple drumbeat'-loving part of your brain."

The piece ends with a full minute of "rain sound effects," closing Reign in Blood.

== Personnel ==
- Tom Araya – bass, vocals
- Kerry King – guitars
- Jeff Hanneman – guitars
- Dave Lombardo – drums

== Live performances ==
"Raining Blood", along with Reign in Blood's opening track "Angel of Death", is an almost permanent addition to Slayer's live set-list, and was Hanneman and King's favorite track to play live. At the end of the Still Reigning DVD, there is a finale with the band covered in fake blood during the performance of "Raining Blood". When asked which song holds best, both Slayer guitarists replied "Raining Blood". Hanneman admitted that he "still love[s] playing that song live. You'd think we'd be tired of it – I mean, I'd love to know how many times we've played it live. That would be really interesting." King said "we could be playing in front of Alanis Morissette, and the crowd loves the part."

King told D. X. Ferris that "whenever 'Raining Blood' comes in the set, it just electrifies the whole crowd. People just shit when you hit the first few notes. Like 'Jesus Christ it's a guitar, settle down.'" In the past, Slayer used fake blood to cover their bodies when performing the song live. However, when asked about using fake blood in future performances, King remarked "It's time to move on, but never say never. I know Japan never saw it, South America and Australia never saw it. So you never know."

== Appearances ==
The song was featured in the 127th South Park episode, "Die Hippie, Die", which aired on March 16, 2005. Slayer guitarist Kerry King found the episode humorous and expressed his interest in the show, mentioning it in an interview, saying "It was good to see the song being put to good use. If we can horrify some hippies, we've done our job."

The song was also included in the Grand Theft Auto: Vice City in-game radio station "V-Rock". It is also revealed to be part of the radio station, “The Chamber 106.6” in the upcoming video game Grand Theft Auto VI. Araya and King will serve as the radio station's DJ. “Raining Blood" is a playable song in the video game Guitar Hero III: Legends of Rock, where it is renowned for being one of the hardest songs in the Career Mode setlist: a 2008 job advertisement for future Guitar Hero playtesters listed the song as one of four that potential applicants had to be capable of playing on the highest difficulty level. The song is also featured in Guitar Hero: Smash Hits, with the first and only five note chord in the series. It was released as a downloadable song for Rock Band 3 on April 10, 2012, along with "South of Heaven" and "Seasons in the Abyss". It was also released as a downloadable song for Rocksmith 2014 on May 19, 2015, as part of the Slayer Song Pack.

At the mixed martial arts event UFC 97 on April 18, 2009, fighter Chuck Liddell made his penultimate appearance in the UFC and used "Raining Blood" as his entrance music.

"Raining Blood" was featured in season 4 of the animated series Invincible, in the episode "Hurm".

== Cover versions ==
The song has been covered by Malevolent Creation, Havok, Natalie Prass, Body Count, Vader, Diecast, Quiet Company, Reggie and the Full Effect, and Erik Hinds, who covered the entire Reign in Blood album on a H'arpeggione. The guitar riffs from "Raining Blood" and "Mandatory Suicide" were sampled by rapper Lil Jon in the song "Stop Fuckin Wit' Me" from the 2004 album Crunk Juice. It was Rick Rubin's only collaboration with Lil Jon on the record. Jon wanted to create a "black version" of Suicidal Tendencies' song "Institutionalized". The New Zealand drum and bass group Concord Dawn produced a drum and bass cover version on their album Uprising, on which they partially sample the famous opening riff of the song, the adult comedy series Fur TV made a parody under the name "Raining Brown".

=== Tori Amos ===
In 2001, the song was covered by Tori Amos on her studio album Strange Little Girls. The cover of "Raining Blood" was suggested by bassist Justin Meldal-Johnsen, who told Amos that she "had tried pretty much every other genre of music, from rap to new wave to punk to country to pop, why not some metal?" Meldal-Johnsen chose the album Reign in Blood, and after listening to it, Amos agreed to make a cover version of "Raining Blood". In an interview, she stated that upon first hearing the song, the imagery she thought of was "this beautiful vulva [laughs] ... raining blood over this male abusive force".

King states the cover was odd; "It took me a minute and a half to find a spot in the song where I knew where she was. It's so weird. If she had never told us, we would have never known. You could have played it for us and we'd have been like, 'What's that?' Like a minute and a half through I heard a line and was like, 'I know where she's at!'" In response, Slayer sent a box of T-shirts to Amos, which she said was appreciated.

== Reception ==
Stylus Magazine's Clay Jarvis said that the song is fit to be the closing song for Reign in Blood, and also noted that the song, along with other songs from Reign in Blood, has "manic, hacksaw guitars, monsoons of double-bass drum rolling and from-the-throat barking—all note-perfect and precise—that still smokes the asses of any band playing fast and/or heavy today". J. Bennett affirmed that the song "still make[s] other metal bands sound like frail pussies". Steve Huey said that it was a classic, and that its "slower riffs offer most of the album's few hints of melody". Erik Hinds from About.com said that the piece has unexpectedly become a ballad. Derrick Harris, an editor of the official newspaper of University of Wisconsin–Eau Claire, said that it had a "blistering solo". It peaked at number 64 in the United Kingdom, where it would stay on the chart for three weeks.

"Raining Blood" has retrospectively been considered one the band's best songs and one of the best songs in metal. In 2012, Loudwire ranked the song number one on their list of the 10 greatest Slayer songs, and in 2020, Kerrang ranked the song number two on their list of the 20 greatest Slayer songs. In 2023, Rolling Stone ranked the song number eight on their list of the 100 greatest heavy metal songs.

== Charts ==
Chart (1987)	Peak position
UK Singles (Official Charts)	64
