= Bob Stagner =

American drummer and percussionist (born 1957)

Bob Stagner (born July 13, 1957) is an American drummer and percussionist who has worked with a wide range of artists in every discipline, from Blueground Undergrass to Derek Bailey and Howard Finster.

Stagner was born in Chattanooga, Tennessee.

Stagner and Dennis Palmer co-founded the free improvisation duo the Shaking Ray Levis and the Shaking Ray Levi Society, an arts education organization that supports emerging artists in performance, art and film. Stagner also works with The Rhythmic Arts Project, founded by drummer Eddie Tuduri.

== Selected discography and credits ==
- Boss Witch, Dennis Palmer, Bob Stagner, J.D. Parran, Steve Beresford, Davey Williams, Frank Pahl, Mary Richards; Shaking Ray Records, 1992
- False Prophets or Dang Good Guessers; Shaking Ray Levis (Stagner, Palmer); Incus Records, 1992
- Live at Lamar's, Derek Bailey, Dennis Palmer, Bob Stagner; Shaking Ray Records, 1999
- Mayor of the Tennessee River David Greenberger, Frank Pahl, Kenny Palmer, Dennis Palmer, Bob Stagner; PelPel Recordings, 2003
- He Who is Blessed, Bob Stagner, executive producer, Tutto Buono, 2005
- A.S.A.P. Wings, Killick Erik Hinds, Dennis Palmer, Bob Stagner; Shaking Ray Records, 2007
