= William B. Troubh Ice Arena =

Ice hockey arena in Portland, Maine

Coordinates: 43°39′23″N 70°16′35″W

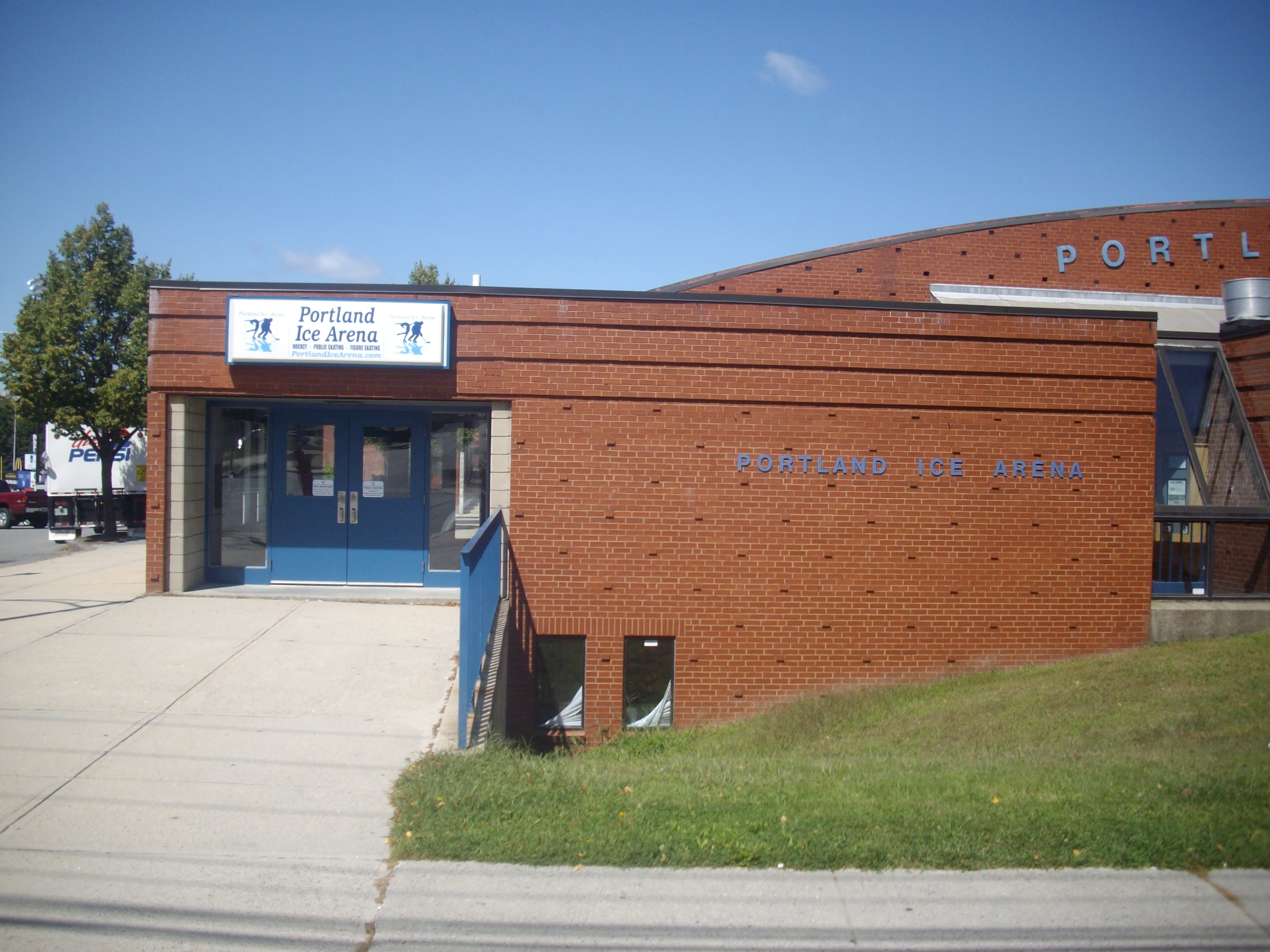
- The main entrance to the Portland Ice Arena in 2008
- Interactive map of William B. Troubh Ice Arena
- Former names: Portland Ice Arena
- Location: Portland, Maine, United States

Construction
- Opened: 1984

Website
- Official Web Site

The William B. Troubh Ice Arena (formerly the Portland Ice Arena) is an ice hockey arena in Portland, Maine, USA. Located on Park Avenue between Fitzpatrick Stadium and Hadlock Field, the Ice Arena has a seating capacity of 750 and is open year around. Since its opening in 1984, it has been home to Portland Pirates hockey practices as well as local amateur teams and open skating hours. The facility was funded by a 20-year bond which was repaid in 2004. During the summer of 2012, the facility closed for energy efficiency repairs, which were the first major upgrades since the building opened in 1984. The repairs were funded by a $625,000 bond passed by voters in 2011 and were estimated to save the city 67,000 kilowatt-hours in energy use yearly. On January 1, 2015 the Portland Ice Arena changed its name officially to the William B. Troubh Ice Arena as a dedication to William B. Troubh.
