= Portland Exposition Building =

Convention center in Portland, Maine

- The Expo

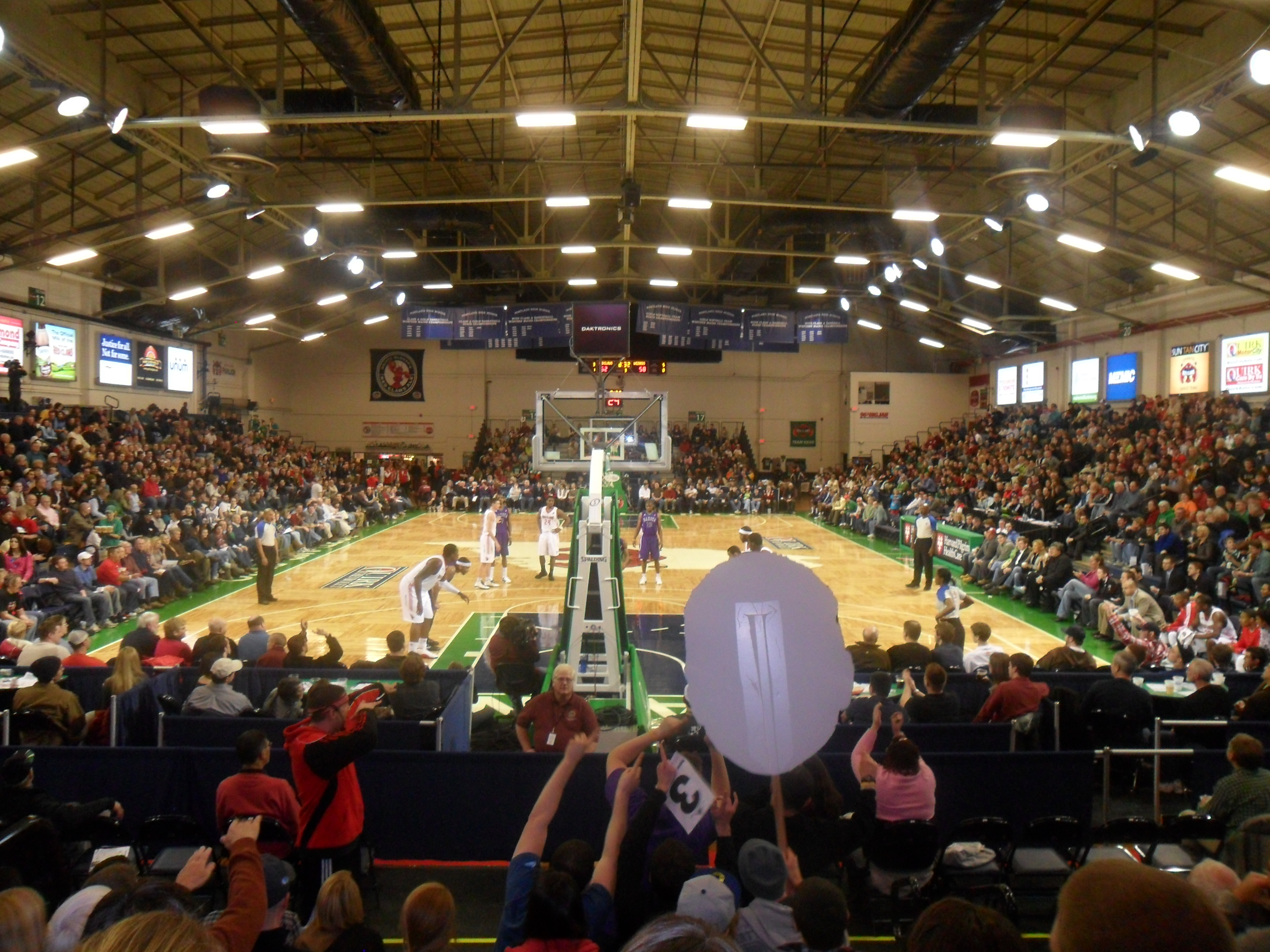
- An NBA G League game at The Expo in 2011

- Location within Maine Location within the United States
- Location: Portland, Maine
- Coordinates: 43°39′23″N 70°16′38″W
- Owner: City of Portland
- Operator: Portland Parks & Recreation
- Capacity: 3,000

Construction
- Opened: June 7, 1915
- Cost: $80,944
- Architect: Frederick A. Tompson

Tenants
- Portland Bulldogs (PPS); Maine Roller Derby (WFTDA; 2008–present); Maine Celtics (NBAGL; 2009–present)

Website
- www.portlandmaine.gov/1164/James-A-Banks-Sr-Portland-Exposition-Bui

The James A Banks Sr Portland Exposition Building, also known as The Expo, is a sports and convention center building complex in Portland, Maine. Much expanded since the original building was constructed in 1914, the complex now includes five inter-connected buildings with 24,000 square feet of exhibition space and ten meeting rooms. It is adjacent to the Hadlock Field and the Portland Ice Arena.

Phish, Ani Difranco, Natalie Merchant, The Monkees, and Rusted Root have played at the venue. It has also hosted trade shows and celebrations. It has been used for the Maine Red Claws basketball team, Portland High School Bulldogs basketball games, and indoor track events. In 2007, the Expo became the home of Maine Roller Derby. Locker rooms for Fitzpatrick Stadium and the visiting clubhouse for Hadlock Field.

== History ==
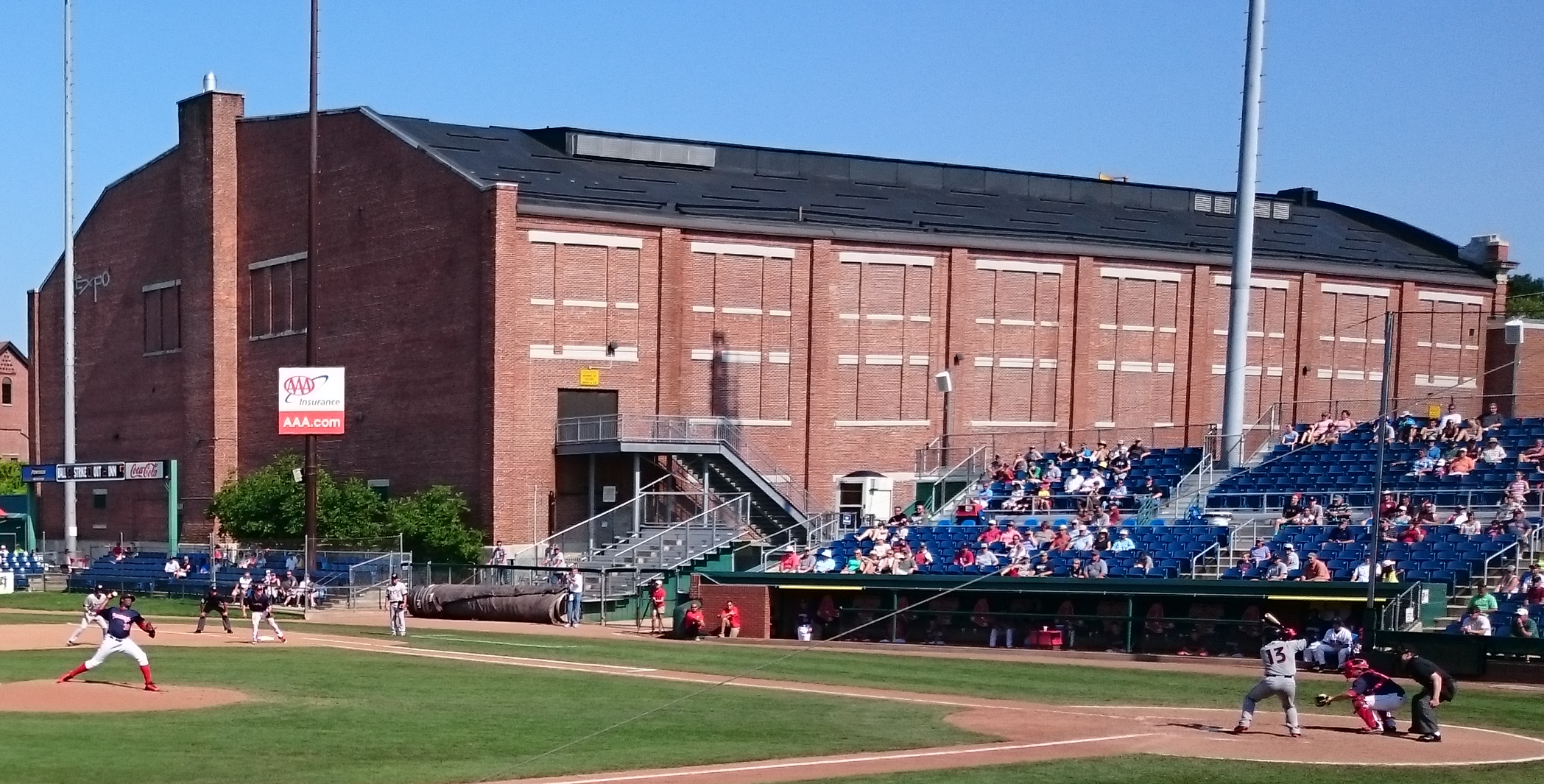
An August 2015 baseball game at Hadlock Field with the Portland Exposition Building in the background.

The Portland Exposition Building was designed by Frederick A. Tompson and was built in 1914 at a cost of $80,944. It is the oldest arena in continuous operation in the United States (after the 2025 closure of Matthews Arena in Boston).

The building was considered a sophisticated facility sure to "put Portland on the map". Its grand opening—a major agricultural show on June 7, 1915, for which the local daily newspaper dedicated the entire front page to covering the event.

In addition to the first-floor arena, the basement level featured the Cafe Dumont. "The Cafe D" was a full-service nightspot which offered "Top international entertainment in a classy nightclub atmosphere."

In September 2007, Maine Roller Derby began hosting flat-track roller derby bouts, with opponents traveling from Montreal, Ohio, New Jersey, New York, New Hampshire, Rhode Island, Massachusetts and Connecticut. The season runs from late April through November, with most bouts occurring April–June.

In 2008, a group of local businesspeople signed a deal to bring an NBA Development League team to the Expo, as well as to renovate the arena's facilities. It was confirmed, and the Expo Building is home to the Maine Red Claws, beginning play for the 2009–10 season.

== Notable events and visitors ==
Over the years, many notable figures have appeared at the Expo, including Babe Ruth, Rudolph Valentino, Rocky Marciano, presidents John F. Kennedy and Barack Obama, and Paavo Nurmi. It has hosted significant performances, including the first East Coast concert of the Beach Boys (1963), James Brown, Dolly Parton, Janis Joplin, Queen (1974), the 60th Anniversary Ball of the Portland Symphony Orchestra, world championship kickboxing, and gala banquets for the Senior's Pro Golf Tournaments featuring Arnold Palmer and Gary Player.

== See also ==
- Augusta Civic Center
- Cross Insurance Arena
- Merrill Auditorium
