= Maine Wildness =

- Full name: Maine Wildness
- Founded: June 4, 2026; 4 months ago
- Ground: Fitzpatrick Stadium
- Capacity: 6,000
- Owner(s): The Soccer Club of Maine; Gabe Hoffman-Johnson (majority); Jonathan and Catherine Culley; Tom Caron
- League: USL W League
- 2027: Inaugural season
- Website: www.mainewildness.com

Maine Wildness is an upcoming USL W League soccer franchise based in Portland, Maine, scheduled to join the league for the 2027 season. The team will play at Portland's Fitzpatrick Stadium, and is owned and operated by The Soccer Club of Maine, which also owns and operates Portland Hearts of Pine, a USL League One team that began play in 2025. Wildness will compete in the W League's Northeast Division.

== History ==
In October 2025, the ownership group of Portland Hearts of Pine, Maine's USL League One franchise, expressed interest in launching a women's team to compete in the USL W League, entering the league in the 2027 season at the earliest. On February 4, 2026, the Hearts of Pine announced "USLW To Portland" and a series of town halls to engage the Portland community around a potential USL W League team. One of the events, a virtual town hall, featured United States women's national soccer team player Sam Coffey, and retired players Michelle Akers and Sara Whalen Hess. In the following months, Akers would be announced as the team's "founding advisor," while Whalen Hess would co-found the USL Long Island franchise to join the Hearts of Pine in USL League One.

On June 4, 2026, the club and USL announced that the W League would be expanding to Maine for the 2027 season. The team will play at Fitzpatrick Stadium, sharing the ground with the Hearts of Pine and Portland High School athletics, pending Portland City Council approval, which was granted on June 16. Season ticket deposits went on sale on June 11, and all 4,300 were sold out within 30 minutes.

The team's name and logo were revealed on October 15, 2026. Team ownership announced that they were rebranding to The Soccer Club of Maine, and intended to make clear that the Hearts of Pine did not own the Wildness, rather that both teams were siblings owned by The Soccer Club of Maine.

== Club crest and colors ==
The club's name is inspired byfrom the "trailblazing spirit" of Maine women, and the crest was designed by Maine-based artist Pame Chávez. The crest features Katahdin, Maine's highest point, surrounded by lupine, thistle, sea rose, and fern, as well as the "Dirigo Heart" from the crest of the Portland Hearts of Pine. The typeface is inspired by hand-carved trail markers common on trails in Maine's wilderness.

Wildness' colors and crest were deliberately designed to be similar to, but distinct from, those of the Hearts of Pine.

== Stadium ==
Wildness will share Fitzpatrick Stadium with the Hearts of Pine and Portland High School's athletic teams, but intend to move into the Cassidy Point stadium when it is finished.

== Ownership ==
Founder Gabe Hoffman-Johnson, real estate developers Jonathan and Catherine Culley, and NESN sportscaster Tom Caron form the majority ownership group, operating under an entity known as The Soccer Club of Maine.
