= Hadlock Field =

Baseball stadium in Portland, Maine, US

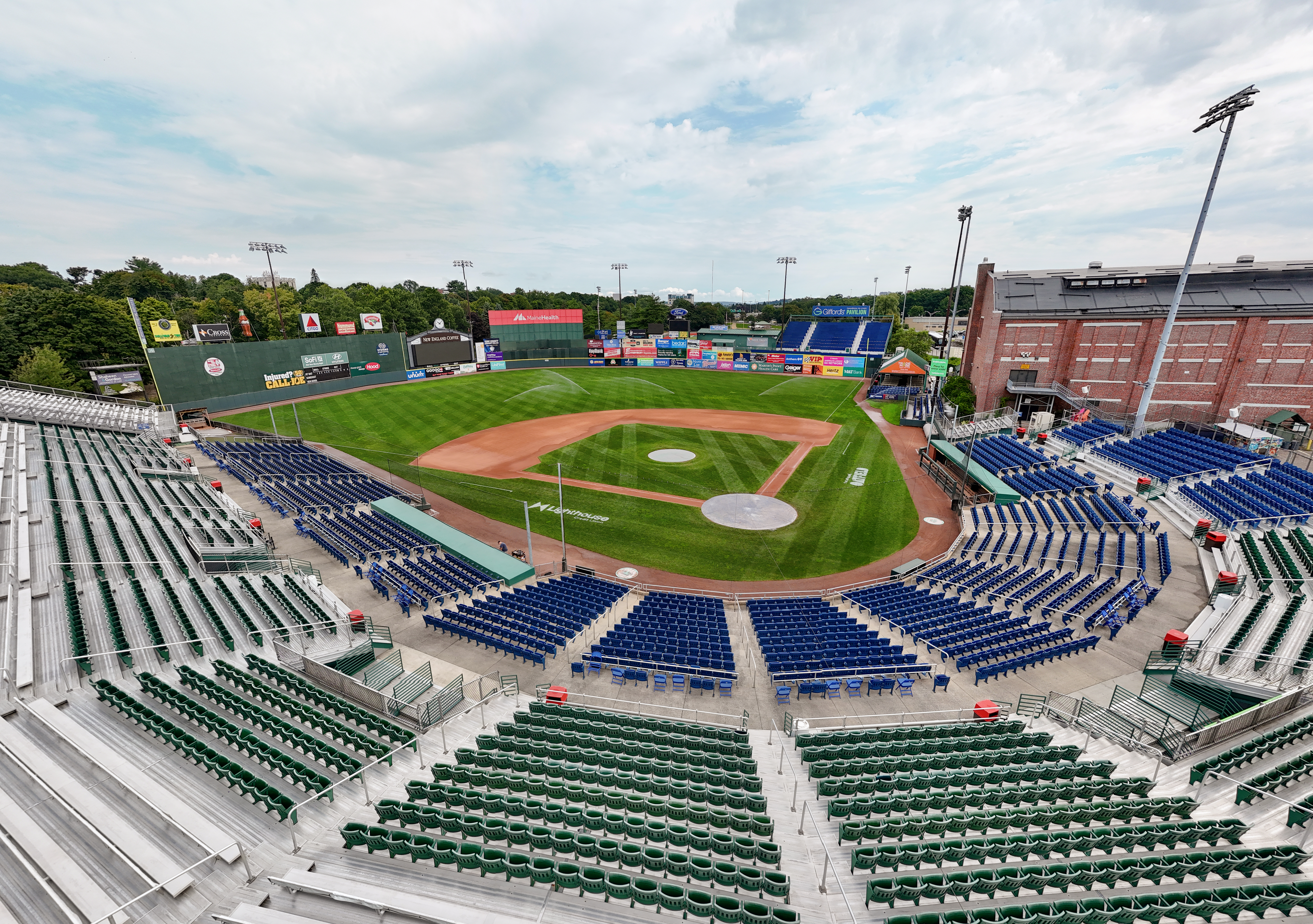
- The ballpark in 2024

- Location within Maine Location within the United States
- Interactive map of Hadlock Field
- Full name: Delta Dental Park at Hadlock Field
- Address: 271 Park Avenue; Portland, Maine, United States
- Coordinates: 43°39′25″N 70°16′42″W
- Owner: City of Portland
- Operator: City of Portland
- Capacity: 7,368
- Surface: Grass
- Field size: Left Field: 315 feet (96 m); Center Field: 400 feet (120 m); Right Field: 330 feet (100 m)
- Public transit: Downeaster at Portland; Greater Portland Metro: 5

Construction
- Groundbreaking: May 21, 1993
- Opened: April 18, 1994
- Expanded: 1995, 1998, 2002, 2006
- Cost: $3 million ($6.52 million in 2025 dollars)
- Architect: William E. Whited Inc.
- Project manager: The Public Works Department of the City of Portland
- General contractor: The Sheridan Corporation

Tenants
- Portland Sea Dogs (EL) 1994–present Portland High School Bulldogs (MPA) 1994–present

Website
- portlandmaine.gov

Delta Dental Park at Hadlock Field is a minor league baseball stadium in Portland, Maine. It is home to the Portland Sea Dogs of the Eastern League and the Portland High School Bulldogs baseball team. The stadium is owned by the city and leased to the Sea Dogs, a Boston Red Sox affiliate owned by Diamond Baseball Holdings.

The stadium is named for Edson B. Hadlock Jr., a long-time Portland High School baseball coach and physics teacher and member of the Maine Baseball Hall of Fame.

== History and development ==
Hadlock Field is located between Interstate 295, the historic Fitzpatrick Stadium, and the Portland Exposition Building, the second-oldest arena in continuous operation in the United States.

The park opened on April 18, 1994. Its initial seating capacity of 6,000 was subsequently expanded to 6,500 in 1995; 6,860 in 1998; and 6,975 in 2002. About 400 seats were added in right field before the start of the 2006 season, and the park currently seats 7,368.

In 2003, when the Sea Dogs affiliated with the Boston Red Sox, various features were added to the stadium to allude to Fenway Park: a replica Green Monster, called the Maine Monster, in left field; a replica Citgo sign; and a large Coke bottle.

In 2006, the tenant Sea Dogs were Eastern League champions.

New video boards were added before the 2014 season.

Field of Dreams Day at Hadlock Field is held on the first Sunday of September. It features the team wearing 1926 Portland Eskimos uniforms. Much like the Hollywood film, with the cornfield set up in center field, the Sea Dogs players emerge through the stalks and run onto the field for the Fan Appreciation Day Game.

In April 2018, Hadlock was named one of the ten best Minor League Baseball (MiLB) stadiums. During the 2019 offseason, new lighting was installed, replacing the prior metal-halide lamps with LED lamps and reducing power consumption by nearly 50%.

When a Sea Dogs player hits a home run, or when the team wins, a fog horn sounds and a light house emerges from behind the outfield fence.

In 2024, Maine lawmakers granted the Sea Dogs $2 million in tax breaks for a new player clubhouse and to make renovations to the playing field. The stadium failed to meet facility requirements set by Major League Baseball for stadiums serving MiLB teams. The clubhouse for visiting teams is in the basement of the nearby Portland Exposition Center. After renovations, the Sea Dogs are to move into a new clubhouse, with visiting teams using the vacated clubhouse.

In October 2024, the team announced that it had accepted an undisclosed amount of money to rename the stadium Delta Dental Park at Hadlock Field after the Delta Dental insurance network.

== Features ==
The left-field fence is 315 feet (96 m) from home plate, the center-field fence is 400 feet (120 m), and the right-field fence is 330 feet (100 m) away.

The left-field wall, dubbed the Maine Monster, is 160 feet long and made of wood. Like the Green Monster in Fenway Park, it is 37 feet (11 m) high, and green. There is a 12-foot (3.7 m) screen above the wall to catch home run balls. Seats cannot be added to the Maine Monster because the Union Branch railroad runs immediately behind it.

It was built after the Portland Sea Dogs announced their affiliation with the Boston Red Sox in 2002, to help train future Red Sox left fielders for the Green Monster and to add character to the ballpark. Construction started on October 28, 2002. The name, Maine Monster, was chosen through a fan contest.

== Gallery ==
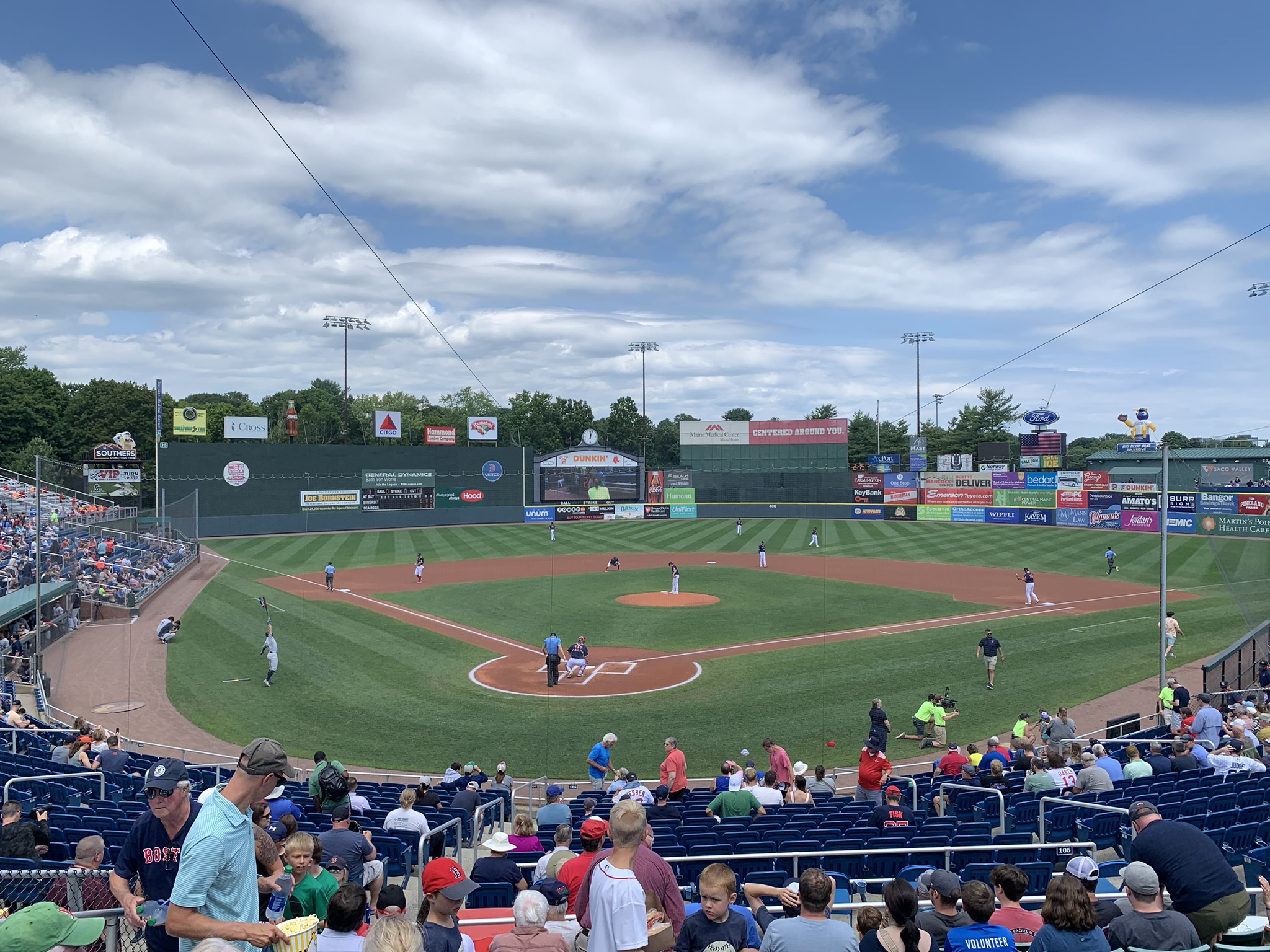
The diamond, outfield, and the "Maine Monster", 2022

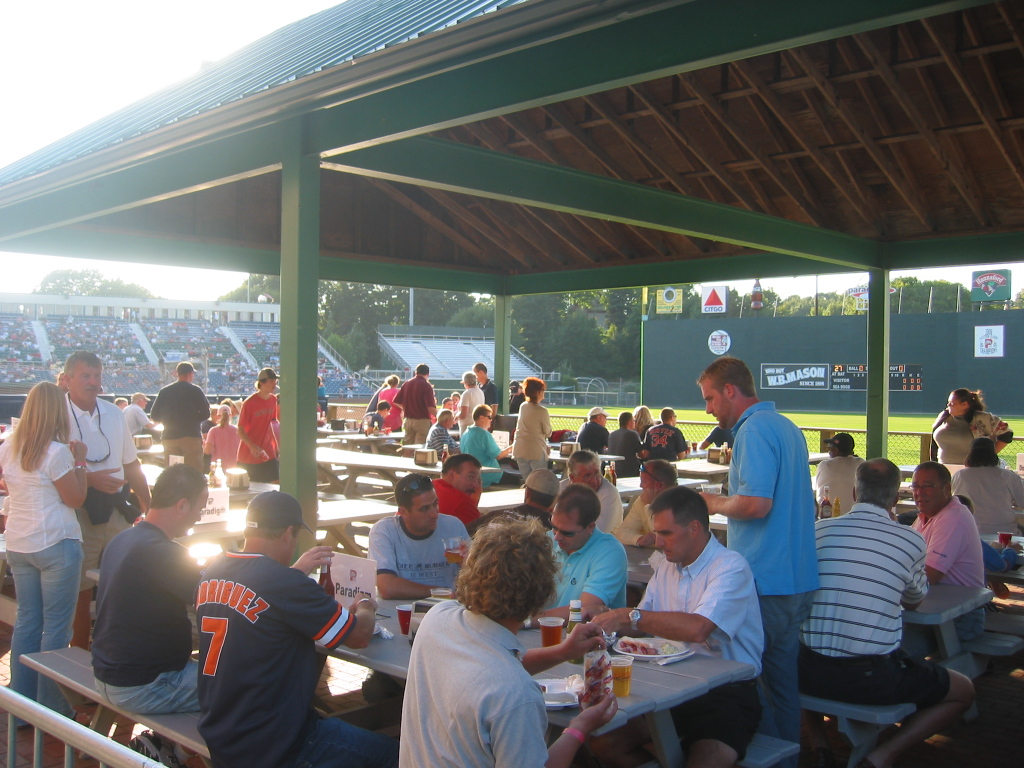
Hadlock Field's picnic area is located alongside the right-field line.

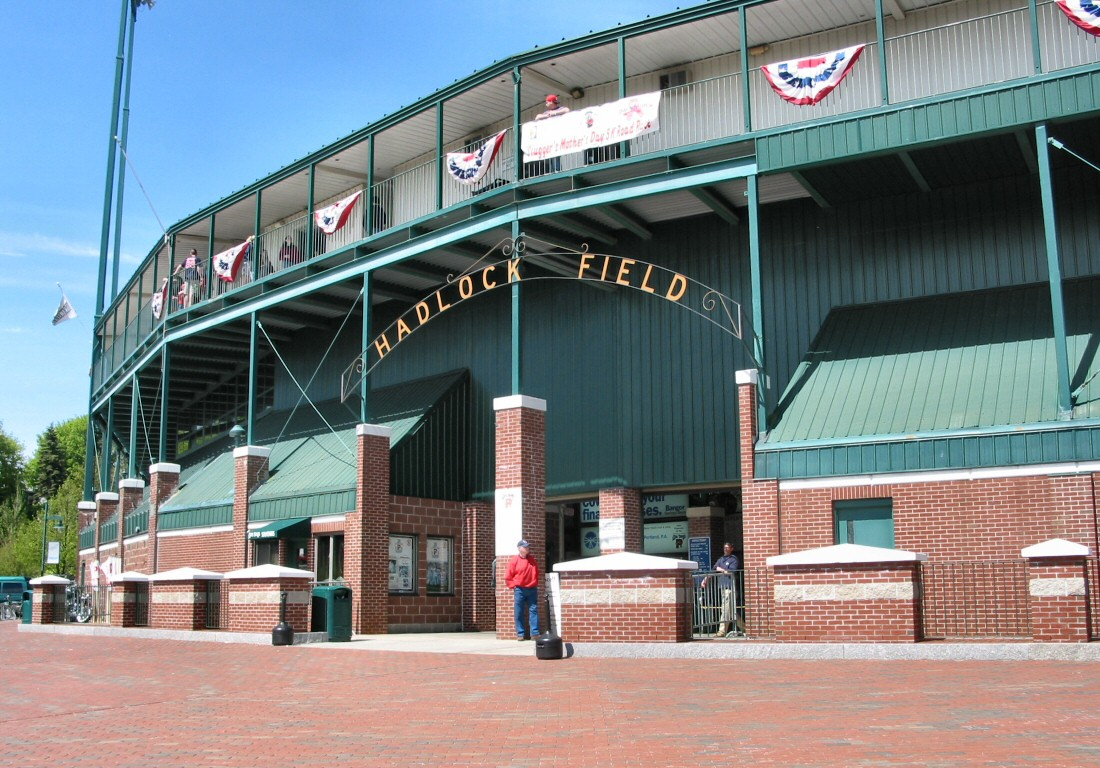
Hadlock Field. May 12, 2007
