= Shaking Ray Levis =

the Shaking Ray Levi Society bicycle peanut

The Shaking Ray Levis is an ongoing collaboration of musicians with a common interest in free improvisation. The project was conceived and led by the Chattanooga, Tennessee-based team of Dennis Palmer and Bob Stagner. They use storytelling, synthesizers, samplers and percussion to achieve their distinctive sound. They are the first American group to have recorded for Incus Records, the record label of British free improvisational guitarist Derek Bailey. Additionally, they have performed and recorded with Borbetomagus, John Zorn, David Greenberger, Killick Erik Hinds, Fred Frith, Min Tanaka, Amy Denio, and Derek Bailey, as well as with many other critically acclaimed artists.

Dennis Palmer died in Chattanooga on February 15, 2013.
