= Killick Erik Hinds =

American musician

Killick with Big Red harp guitar, Flicker Theatre, Athens GA, March 2007

Killick Hinds (born 1972) of Athens, Georgia is a composer and performer of a wide range of music. He plays quartertone electric guitar, as well as Big Red harp guitar and the h'arpeggione, an 18-stringed upright acoustic instrument with sympathetic strings. Both instruments were built by Fred Carlson. Equally influenced by improvisational music and "composed" sounds, Killick's style blends primitive folk, heavy metal, and sacred music from around the world. Killick has played with improvisers including Susan Alcorn, Liz Allbee, Susie Allen, Brent Bagwell, Colin Bragg, Jeff Crouch, Chris Cutler, Jeremiah Cymerman, Brann Dailor, Ernesto Diaz-Infante, Lisle Ellis, Tony Evans, Drew Gardner, the Georgia Guitar Quartet, Vinny Golia, Frank Gratkowski, Mary Halvorson, Blake Helton, Carl Ludwig Huebsch, Henry Kaiser, Ben Kennedy, Harald Kimmig, Habib Koité, Peter Kowald, Craig Lieske, Marshall Marrotte, Jeff McLeod, Tatsuya Nakatani, Larry Ochs, Brian Osborne, Ravi Padmanabha, Dennis Palmer, Dave Rempis, Blaise Siwula, Carl Smith, Bob Stagner, Sándor Szabó, Ken Vandermark, Matthew Welch, and Eric Zinman.

Killick started Sol Ponticello Records in 2001, and he released a solo H'arpeggione cover version of Slayer's Reign in Blood in 2005.

Killick married Delene Porter in Key West, Florida, on August 9, 2003.

== H'arpeggione ==
The H'arpeggione is an instrument built by Fred Carlson for Killick Hinds. It is an electric upright quartertone-fretted, six-string instrument tuned from a contrabass A♭ up to E♭ (half-step below the high E on the guitar). The H'arpeggione also has 12 resonating sympathetic strings which run through the neck and emerge over the body and run to a separate buzzing bridge. The body is larger than an acoustic guitar, with an arched fingerboard and a bridge for bowing or plucking, a spike for upright playing position, and a top made of (recycled) redwood.
