= Fitzpatrick Stadium =

Multi-purpose stadium in Portland, Maine, US

- Fitzy Fort Fitzy
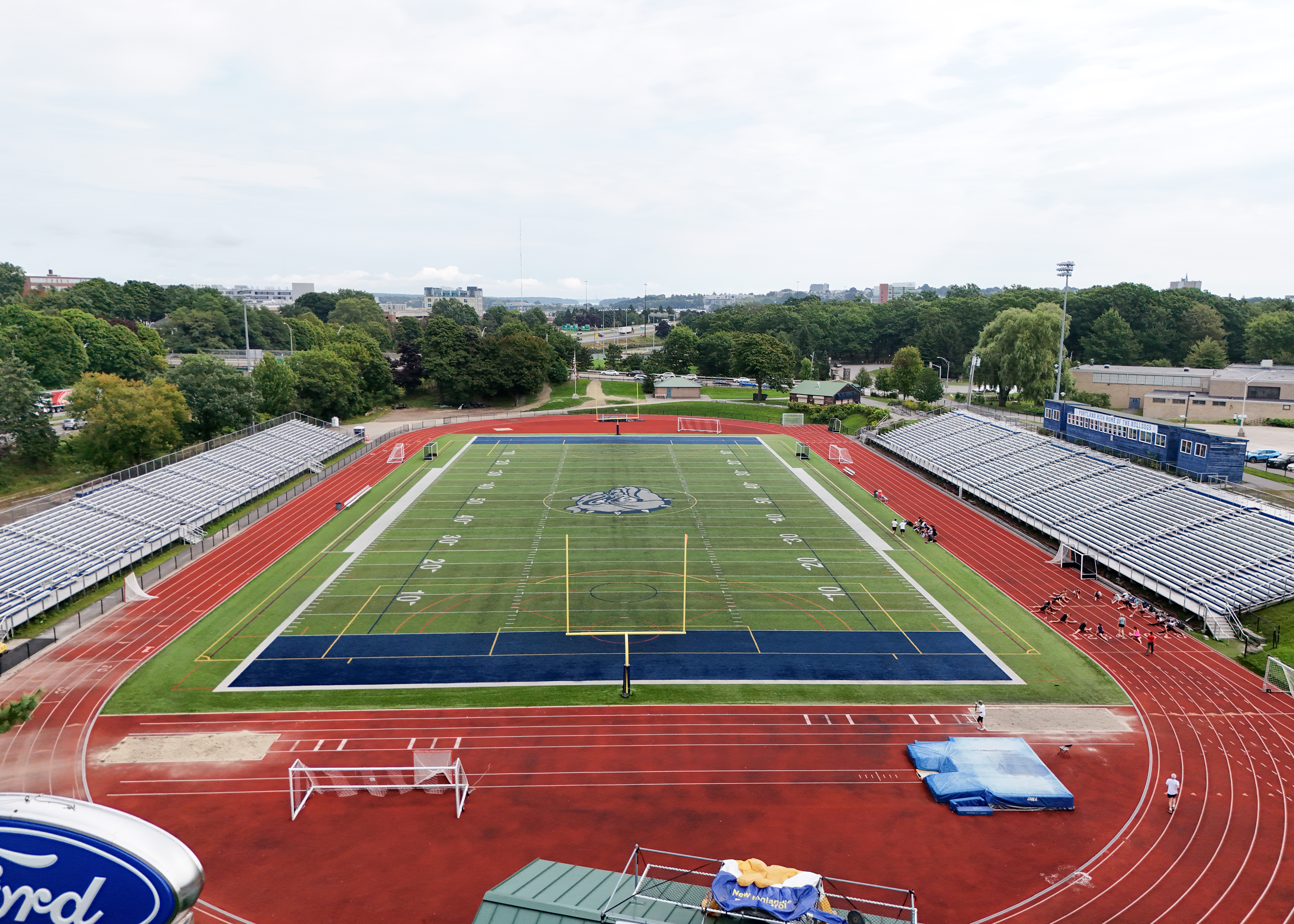
- 2024
- Interactive map of Fitzpatrick Stadium
- Full name: James J. Fitzpatrick Stadium
- Former names: Portland Stadium
- Address: 140 Deering Avenue
- Location: Portland, Maine, United States
- Coordinates: 43.657875°N 70.276741°W
- Owner: City of Portland
- Operator: City of Portland
- Capacity: 6,000; 5,500 (USL Configuration)
- Surface: FieldTurf (2001–present); Grass (1930–2001)
- Public transit: Downeaster at Portland; Greater Portland Metro: 5

Construction
- Opened: 1930
- Renovated: 2001, 2010, 2024

Tenants
- Portland Hearts of Pine (USL1) (2025–present); Portland High School Bulldogs (MPA) (1930–present); Portland Pilots (NEL) (1946–1949); Maine Wildness (USLW) (2027-future)

Website
- portlandmaine.gov

James J. Fitzpatrick Stadium (formerly Portland Stadium) is a 6,000-seat multi-purpose outdoor stadium in Portland, Maine, United States. Built in 1930, it sits between Interstate 295, Hadlock Field baseball stadium, King Middle School, and the Portland Exposition Building. It is located across Deering Avenue from Deering Oaks Park. It was renamed in 1986 to honor James J. Fitzpatrick. It is the primary stadium for Portland High School athletics and the USL League One team Portland Hearts of Pine.

== History ==
=== Construction ===
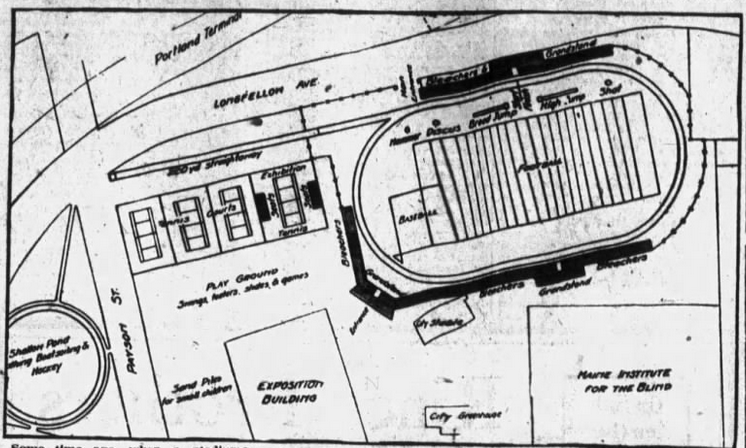
Initial plans for Portland Stadium, published in the Evening Express in 1923.

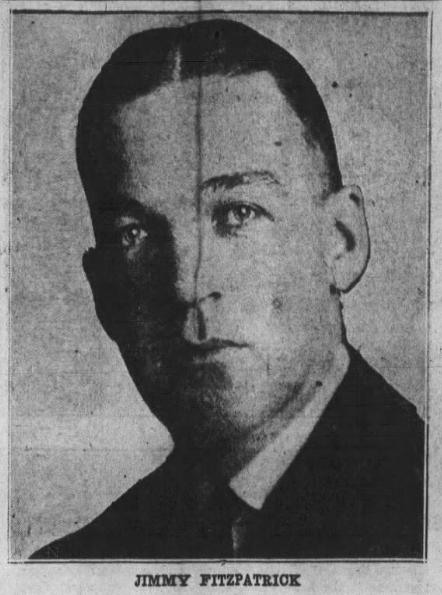
Coach James J. Fitzpatrick, for whom the stadium is named.

Plans have existed for a stadium for Portland's high schools since at least 1921. At this time, the Portland School District pushed to have a publicly funded stadium to replace its use of Bayside Park, which Portland and Deering High School shared. In 1923, the Portland Evening Express published plans for a football and baseball stadium next to the Portland Exposition Building. That March, the state senate passed a bill approving the stadium. Architect Gavin Hadden designed a proposal for the stadium between Ocean Avenue and Back Bay Boulevard. The proposal would be phased out: the first stage would build the two sideline stands, costing $170,000 and seating 11,000, and the final design would cost $440,000 and seat 33,000 when completed.

In April 1930, the Portland High School Stadium Commission put forth a plan to the school board for a 10,000-seat stadium, including a quarter-mile track and a baseball diamond. The initial plans accounted for a potential expansion to 20,000 seats within the next two years. The stadium opened in October 1931 to a crowd of 7,000 people for a football game between Portland High School and Deering High School; Portland lost 7–2. In a dedication ceremony before the game, two planes gave a salute, and Edward W. Cram (chairman of the Stadium Committee) threw a football from the stands down to Portland coach Jimmy Fitzpatrick.

=== High school sports stadium ===
The Portland Pilots, a minor league baseball team playing in the New England League as an affiliate of the Philadelphia Phillies, played at what was then known as Portland Stadium from 1946 until the league's dissolution in 1949.

On November 27, 1986, the stadium was renamed to Fitzpatrick Stadium, in honor of James J. Fitzpatrick. That year, the stadium also added lights after a fundraising effort.

In both 1987 and 1988, the University of Maine football team team played a game in Fitzpatrick Stadium, although they discontinued this practice as the 5,500 person-capacity was well short of the 15,000 seats they'd need to make the trip financially feasible.

In 2001, the stadium received a $1.4 million renovation replaced the grass with FieldTurf, gave the track with a rubberized surface, and added rest rooms.

In November 2010, a $950,000 renovation began to replace the bleachers. Modeled after Memorial Stadium at Deering High School, the bleachers hold approximately 3,500 seats on the home side and 2,500 seats on the away side. The Portland High School Bulldogs are the primary tenant. The city of Portland paid for the renovation out of the capital improvement fund.

In 2015, the city spent around $1 million to replace the turf and running track.

=== Hearts of Pine (2025–present) ===
Since 2025, Fitzpatrick Stadium has served as the home of professional soccer club Portland Hearts of Pine of USL League One. On November 14, 2023, the Portland city council unanimously approved a 10-year lease with the team. The team would pay over $1 million to improve the facility, and would receive free rent in exchange. The lease was upgraded in October 2024 to allow the team to replace the turf field, and to remove the Portland High School bulldog mascot from the field. The club invested over $2.5 million into stadium renovations, including a replacement turf, improvements to the press box, upgrades to the LED lighting, and semi-permanent locker rooms. During the renovations, 850 cubic yards (650 m^{3}) of arsenic-contaminated soil were unearthed, which the city disposed of using a $205,000 federal grant.

The team made their home debut on May 4, 2025, with more than 5,000 fans in attendance for a 1–1 draw against One Knoxville SC. Knoxville's Stuart Ritchie scored the first goal at Fitzpatrick Stadium in the second minute, while Masashi Wada scored the first Hearts of Pine goal at Fitzpatrick in first half stoppage time.

The Hearts of Pine set the USL League One attendance record by drawing 6,440 people to an October 21 game against Spokane Velocity.

On August 4, 2026, the Hearts of Pine announced that they had purchased land on Cassidy Point in Portland's West End neighborhood with the intention of building a stadium for both the men's and women's team. The club estimated that it would cost $50 million to build, and projected that the stadium would be ready for the 2029 season.

=== Maine Wildness ===
On June 4, 2026, the Hearts of Pine announced they were founding a women's team, to compete in the USL W League for the 2027 season, and that the team will play at Fitzpatrick Stadium. The team was formally announced as the Maine Wildness on October 15, 2026.

== Events ==
Fitzpatrick Stadium is the home field for the Portland Hearts of Pine and Portland High School Bulldogs. The stadium is used for state high school football championships, the City of Portland high schools lacrosse league, Maine Elite Men's Lacrosse League, state high school lacrosse championships, and the Maine Senior Games. The facility has occasionally hosted University of Maine Football games and local and high school soccer and track events. It was home to the Portland Pilots from 1946 to 1949.

In 1960, Democratic presidential nominee John F. Kennedy spoke at Portland Stadium during his presidential campaign.

In September 2023, investors known as USL to Portland were awarded a future USL League One team, Portland Hearts of Pine. In November 2023, the Portland City Council approved a lease that allowed the team to begin play at Fitzpatrick Stadium in 2025.
