= Augusta Civic Center =

Multi purpose arena in Maine

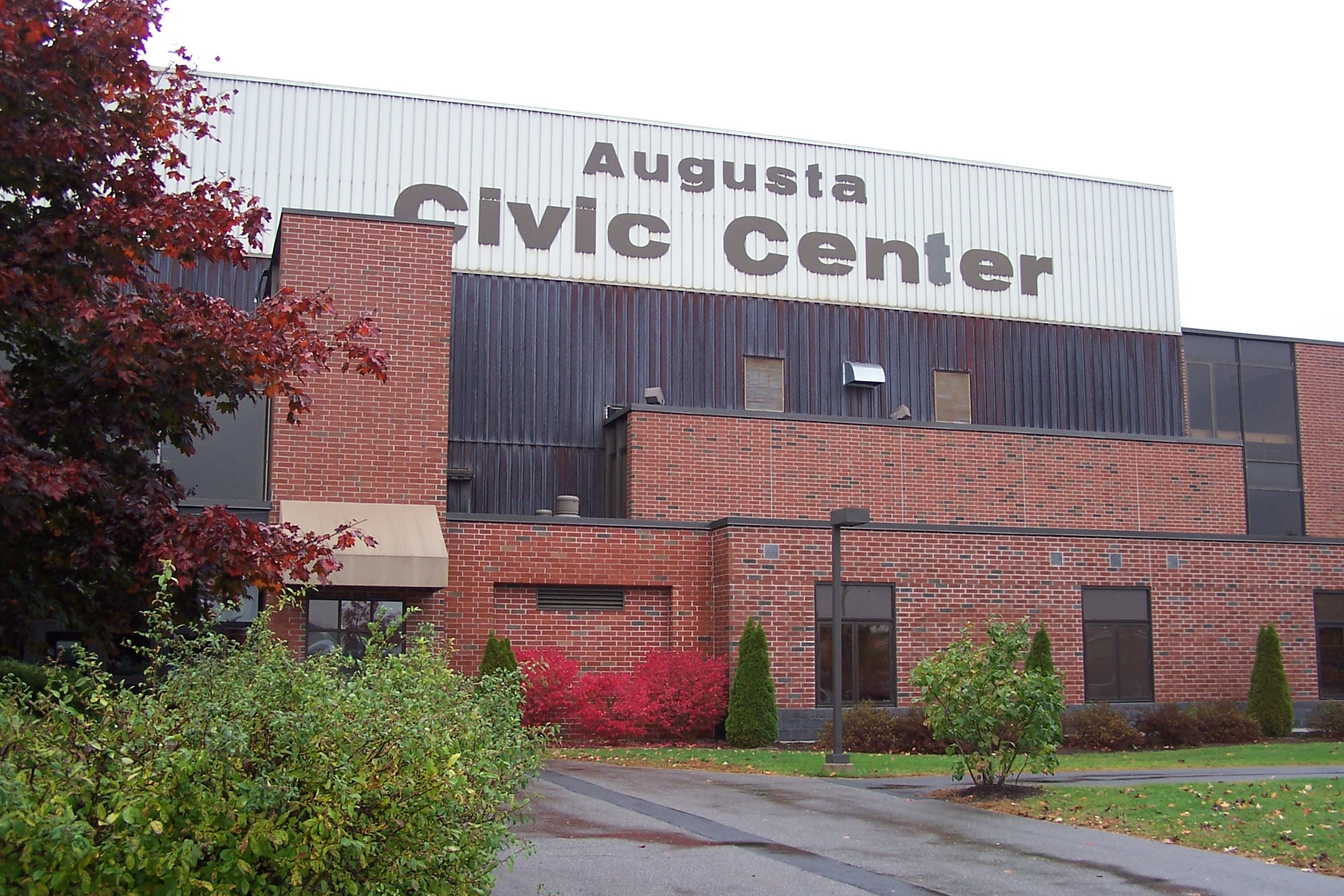
- The Civic Center in October 2008
- Interactive map of Augusta Civic Center
- Address: 76 Community Dr; Augusta, ME 04330-8008
- Coordinates: 44°20′33″N 69°47′56″W
- Owner: City of Augusta
- Capacity: 5,099 (Auditorium)

Construction
- Groundbreaking: May 1972
- Opened: January 6, 1973
- Architect: Bunker & Savage
- General contractors: Stewart & Williams

The Augusta Civic Center is a convention center located in Augusta, Maine. It has a total of 49,000 square feet (4,600 m^{2}) and 26 rooms. The main room is 32,000 sq ft (3,000 m^{2}). The facility includes a main auditorium, two ballrooms, and 23 meeting rooms and full catering services. The arena can host many events such as concerts, gatherings and sporting events.

Its largest venue is the Hammond Lumber Auditorium, formerly known as the Paul G. Poulin Auditorium.

== Concerts ==
Elvis Presley played at the Center during his spring 1977 tour on May 24, 1977. He was scheduled to perform at the Cumberland County Civic Center in Portland, Maine, for two concerts on August 17 and 18. On August 16, Presley was pronounced dead at age 42 at his Graceland home in Memphis, Tennessee due to heart failure after years of prescription drug abuse. The Center sold over 12,000 tickets for the two scheduled shows.

The Grateful Dead performed at the Center on three occasions, including a performance on September 2, 1979, and a celebrated two-night run spanning October 11–12, 1984.

Phish performed on October 19, 2010, during their Fall Tour.

Pearl Jam performed during their No Code Tour on September 26, 1996, with The Fastbacks as their opening act. Chicago Bulls player Dennis Rodman attended the show and during the climax of "Alive", came onstage to offer Vedder some red wine. To the excitement of the crowd, Vedder responded by hopping on Rodman's back and riding him piggyback style across the stage while singing. Rodman later received a Walkman carved with Vedder's initials containing the concert recording and cited this as one of his most thrilling experiences.

The thrash metal band Slayer filmed their 2004 live performance DVD Still Reigning at the Augusta Civic Center.

== Sporting events ==
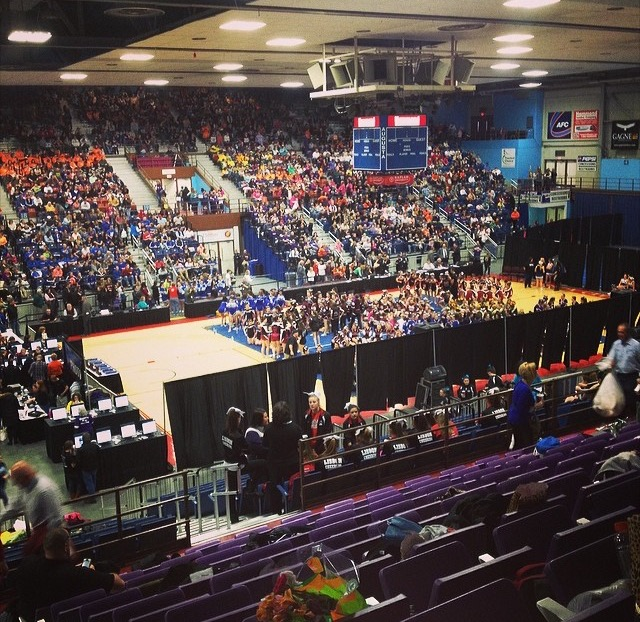
State Cheering Competition Awards 2015

The Center hosts concerts and sporting events such as basketball, cheerleading, dance, boxing, fencing, and wrestling The center is used for high school, collegial and youth competitions and games, most notably the Maine State High School Basketball tournament each February. The Center is used mostly by colleges such as University of Maine, University of Maine at Augusta, Central Maine Community College and many other local schools.

Most State and Regional competitions and games take place here. Many of these events are involved in Cheerleading Competitions, Basketball Games, and Wrestling matches at the High School level.
